= Chikuzen-Yamate Station =

Railway station in Sasaguri, Fukuoka Prefecture, Japan

JC 07 Chikuzen-Yamate Station 筑前山手駅
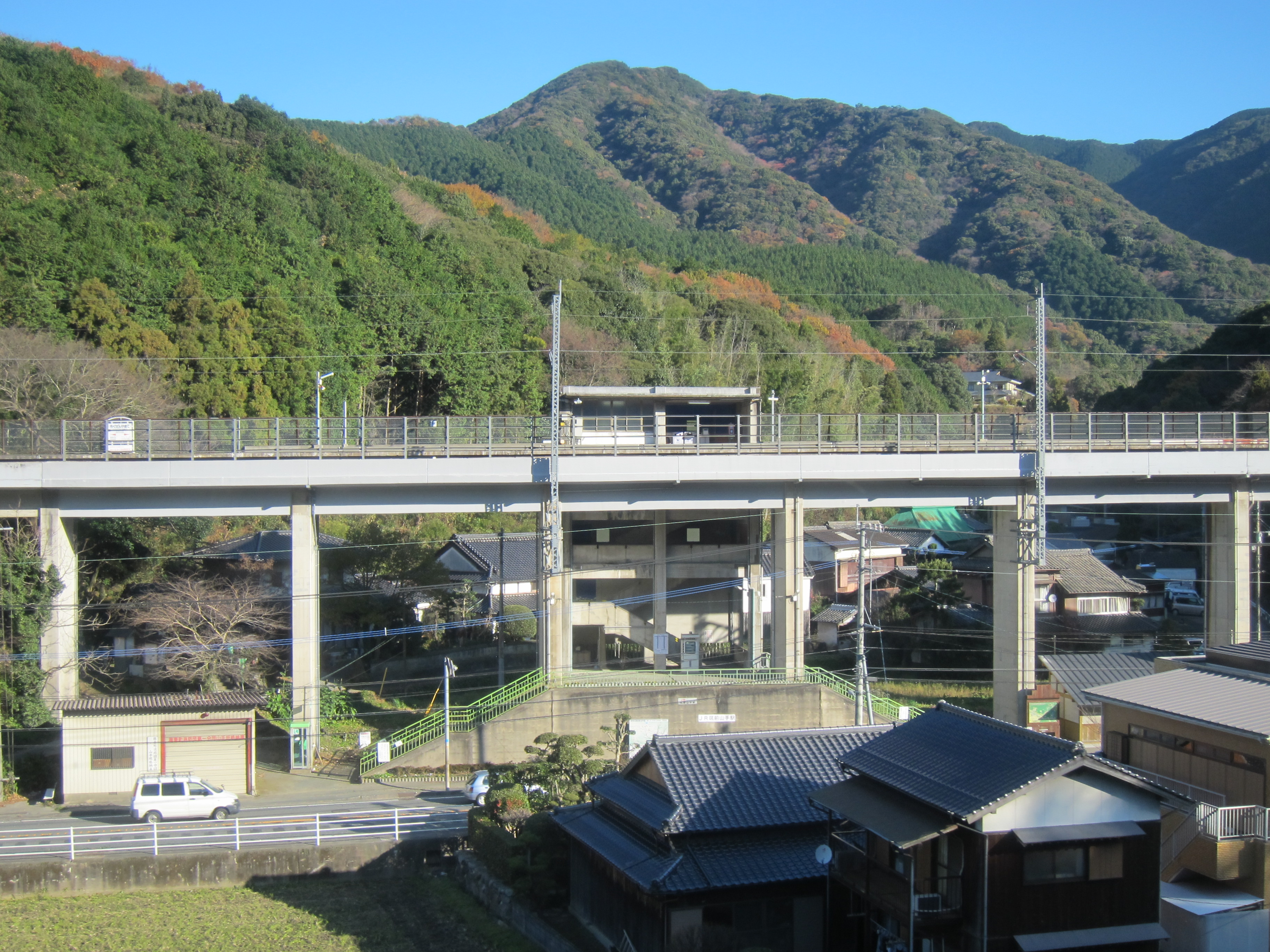
- Station building and elevated platform, December 2011

General information
- Location: Sasaguri, Kasuya-gun, Fukuoka-ken 811-2405; Japan
- Coordinates: 33°37′20″N 130°33′26″E
- Operator: JR Kyushu
- Line: JC Sasaguri Line
- Distance: 5.0 km from Yoshizuka
- Platforms: 2 side platforms
- Tracks: 2

Construction
- Structure type: Elevated

Other information
- Status: Unstaffed
- Website: Official website

History
- Opened: 25 May 1968

Passengers
- FY2018: 57 daily

Services
Preceding station	JR Kyushu	Following station
Sasaguri towards Hakata	Sasaguri Line Local	Kido-Nanzōin-mae towards Keisen
Location
- Location within Fukuoka Prefecture Location within Japan

Chikuzen-Yamate Station (筑前山手駅, Chikuzen-Yamate-eki) is a passenger railway station located in the town of Sasaguri, Fukuoka Prefecture, Japan. It is operated by JR Kyushu.

== Lines ==
The station is served by the Sasaguri Line and is located 13.4 km from the starting point of the line at Yoshizuka. The station is sometimes depicted on maps and timetables as part of the Fukuhoku Yutaka Line, of which the Sasaguri Line is a component.

== Station layout ==
The station, which is unstaffed, consists of a side platform serving a single elevated track. From the main road, a flight of steps leads to a dias. A tall stairwell then gives access to the platform. An automatic ticket vending machine is located at the base of the stairwell. A toilet building is located next to the dias.

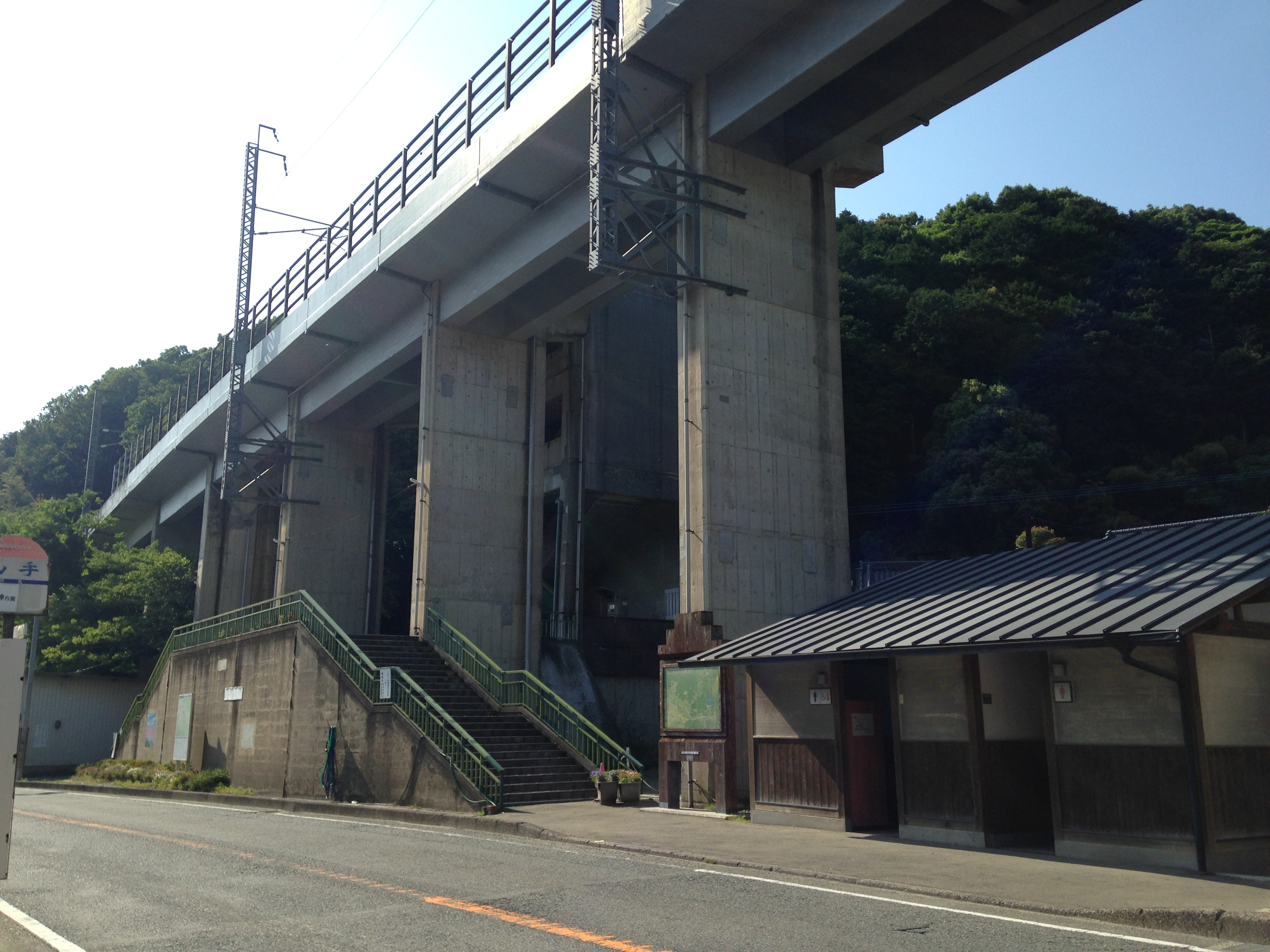
The steps up the dias and the toilet building

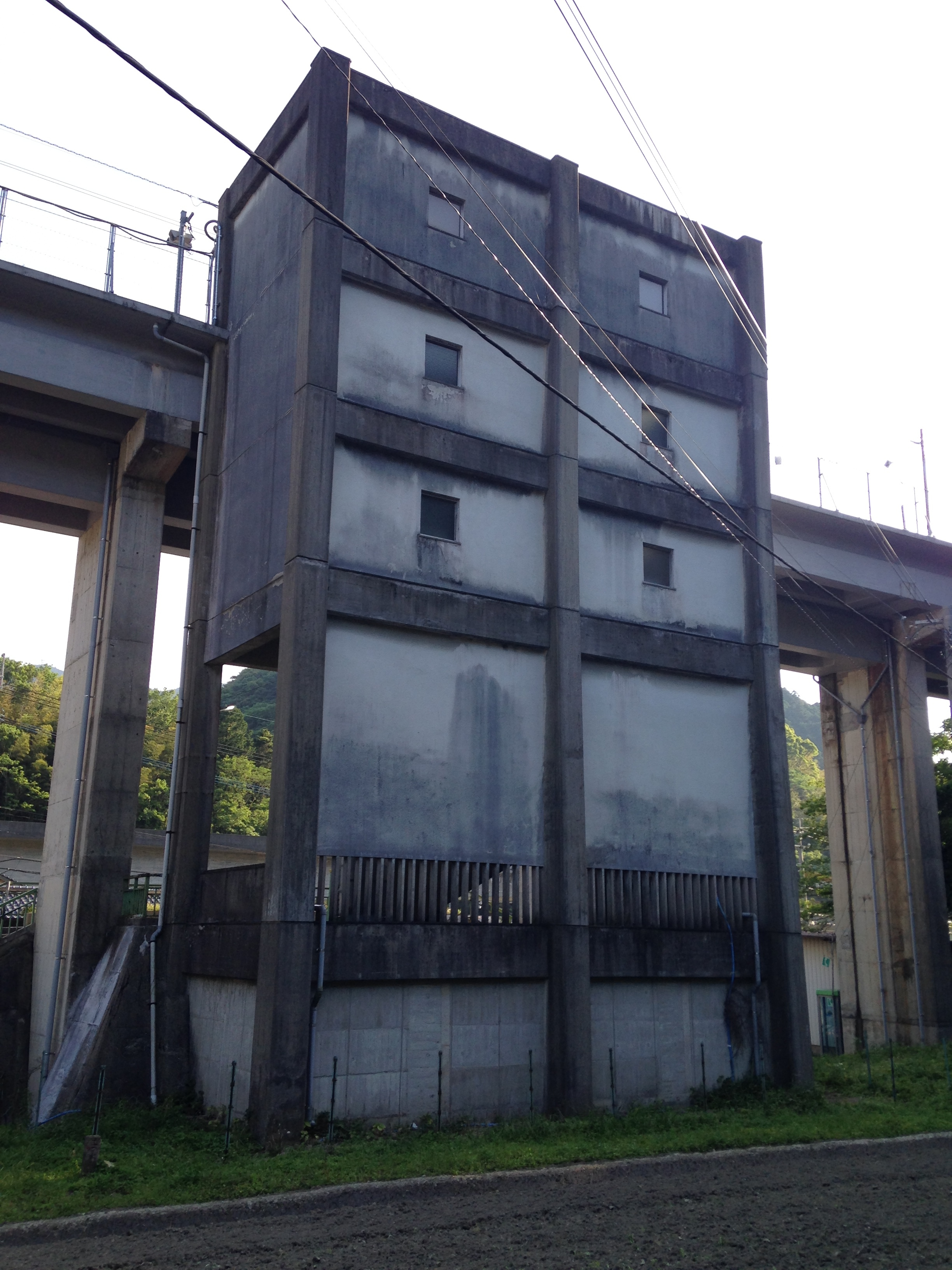
The stairwell from the rear.

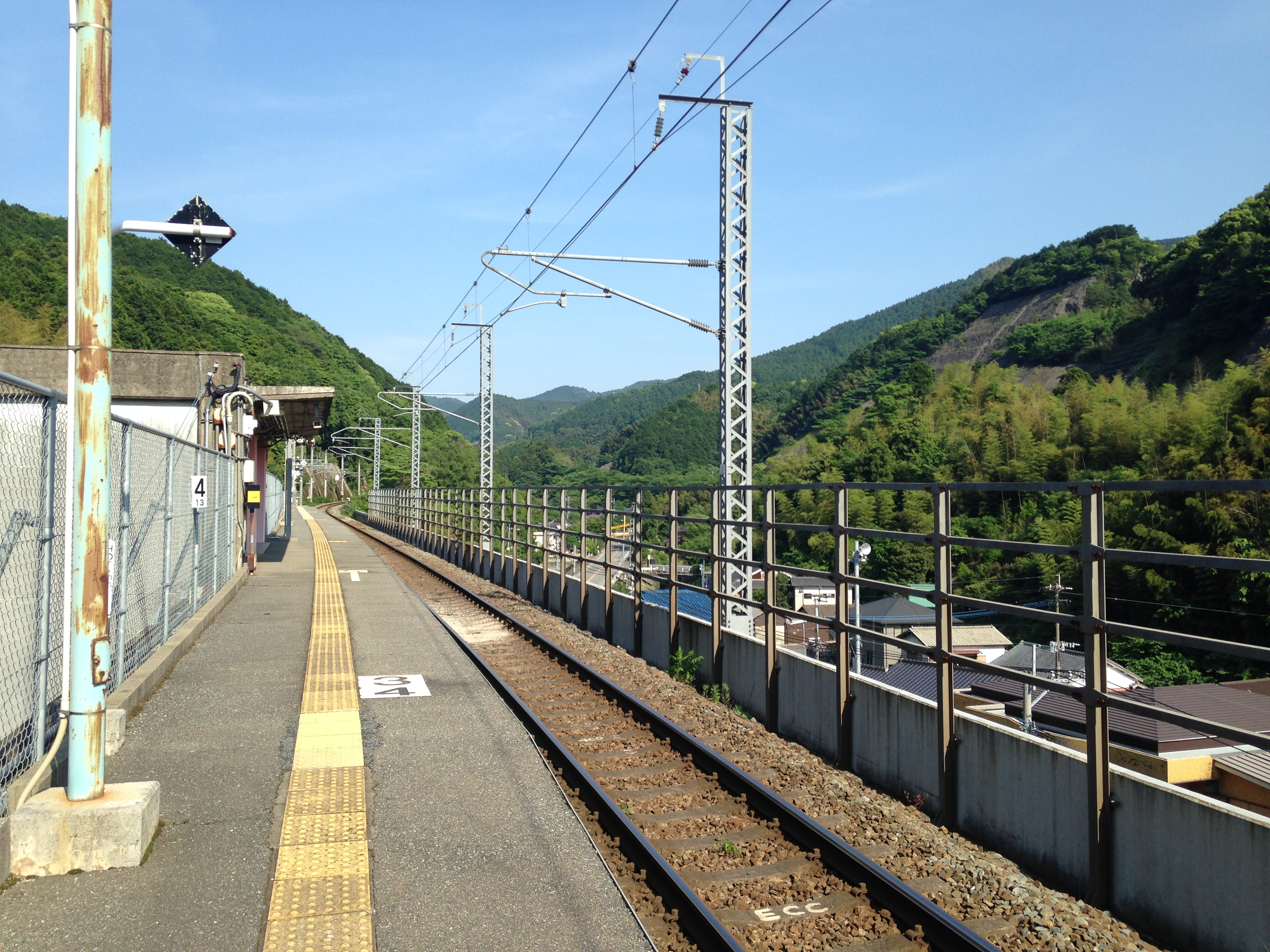
A view of the platform and track.

== History ==
The station was opened by Japanese National Railways (JNR) on 25 May 1968 as an intermediate station when it extended the Sasaguri Line east from Sasaguri to Keisen. With the privatization of JNR on 1 April 1987, JR Kyushu took over control of the station.

== Surrounding area ==
Japan National Route 201 runs parallel to the railroad tracks beneath the station. Located in a mountainous area, there are no large-scale facilities around the station, and the area is deserted, with only a few souvenir shops and inns catering to pilgrims to the Sasaguri Shin-Shikoku 88 Sacred Sites.

== See also ==
- List of railway stations in Japan
