= Chōjabaru Station =

Railway station in Kasuya, Fukuoka Prefecture, Japan

JC 04 JD 11 Chōjabaru Station 長者原駅
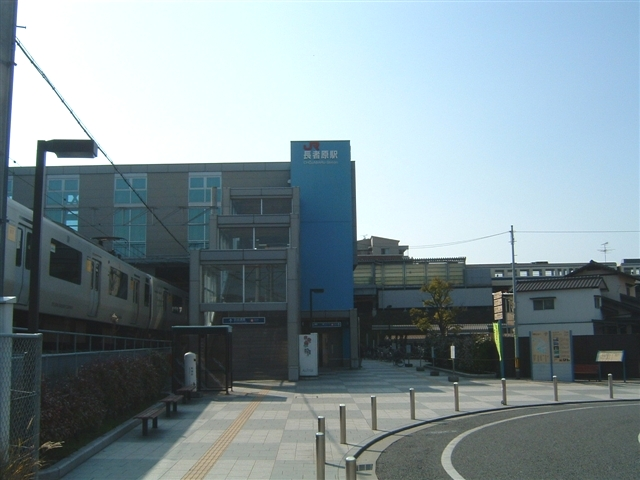
- Chōjabaru Station

General information
- Location: 1-chōme-9 Chōjabaruhigashi, Kasuya-machi, Kasuya-gun, Fukuoka-ken 811-2317; Japan
- Coordinates: 33°36′48.48″N 130°28′40.16″E
- Operator: JR Kyushu
- Lines: JDSasaguri Line (Fukuhoku Yutaka Line); JD Kashii Line
- Platforms: 1 side + 1 island platform

Other information
- Status: Sttaffed (Midori no Madoguchi )
- Website: Official website

History
- Opened: 13 March 1988

Passengers
- FY2020: 3142 daily
- Rank: 50th (among JR Kyushu stations)

Services
| Preceding station | JR Kyushu | Following station |
|---|---|---|
| Harumachi towards Hakata | Sasaguri Line Local | Kadomatsu towards Keisen |
| Yoshizuka towards Hakata | Sasaguri Line Rapid | Sasaguri towards Keisen |
| Iga towards Saitozaki | Kashii Line Local | Sakado towards Umi |
Location
- Location within Fukuoka Prefecture Location within Japan

Chōjabaru Station (長者原駅, Chōjabaru-eki) is a junction passenger railway station located in the town of Kasuya, Fukuoka Prefecture, Japan. It is operated by Kyushu Railway Company (JR Kyushu).

== Lines ==
The station is served by the Kashii Line and is located 19.2 km from the terminus of the line at Saitozaki. It is also served by the Sasaguri Line (Fukuhoku Yutaka Line) and is 19.4 kilometers from the starting point of that line at Keisen

== Station layout ==
The station consists of side platform for the Kashii Line, which almost intercrosses above one island platform with two tracks for Sasaguri Line in a right angle. The elevated station building is located able the Sasaguri Line platform and has a Midori no Madoguchi staffed tucket office.

=== Platforms ===
| 1 | ■ JC Sasaguri Line | for Keisen, Nōgata and Orio |
| 2 | ■ JC Sasaguri Line | for Hakata |
| 3 | ■ JD Kashii Line | for Kashii and Saitozaki for Umi |

== History ==
The station was opened by JR Kyushu on 13 March 1988 as an additional station on the existing track of the Sasaguri Line.

== Passenger statistics ==
In fiscal 2020, there was a daily average of 3142 boarding passengers at this station, making it the 50th busiest station on the JR Kyushu network.。

== Surrounding area ==
- Kasuya Town Hall
- Kayocho Park (Kayocho Pond)
- Fukuoka Prefectural Fukuoka Kaisei High School
- Kasuya Town Kasuya Central Elementary School

== See also ==
- List of railway stations in Japan
