= Hisayama, Fukuoka =

Hisayama 久山町
- Town
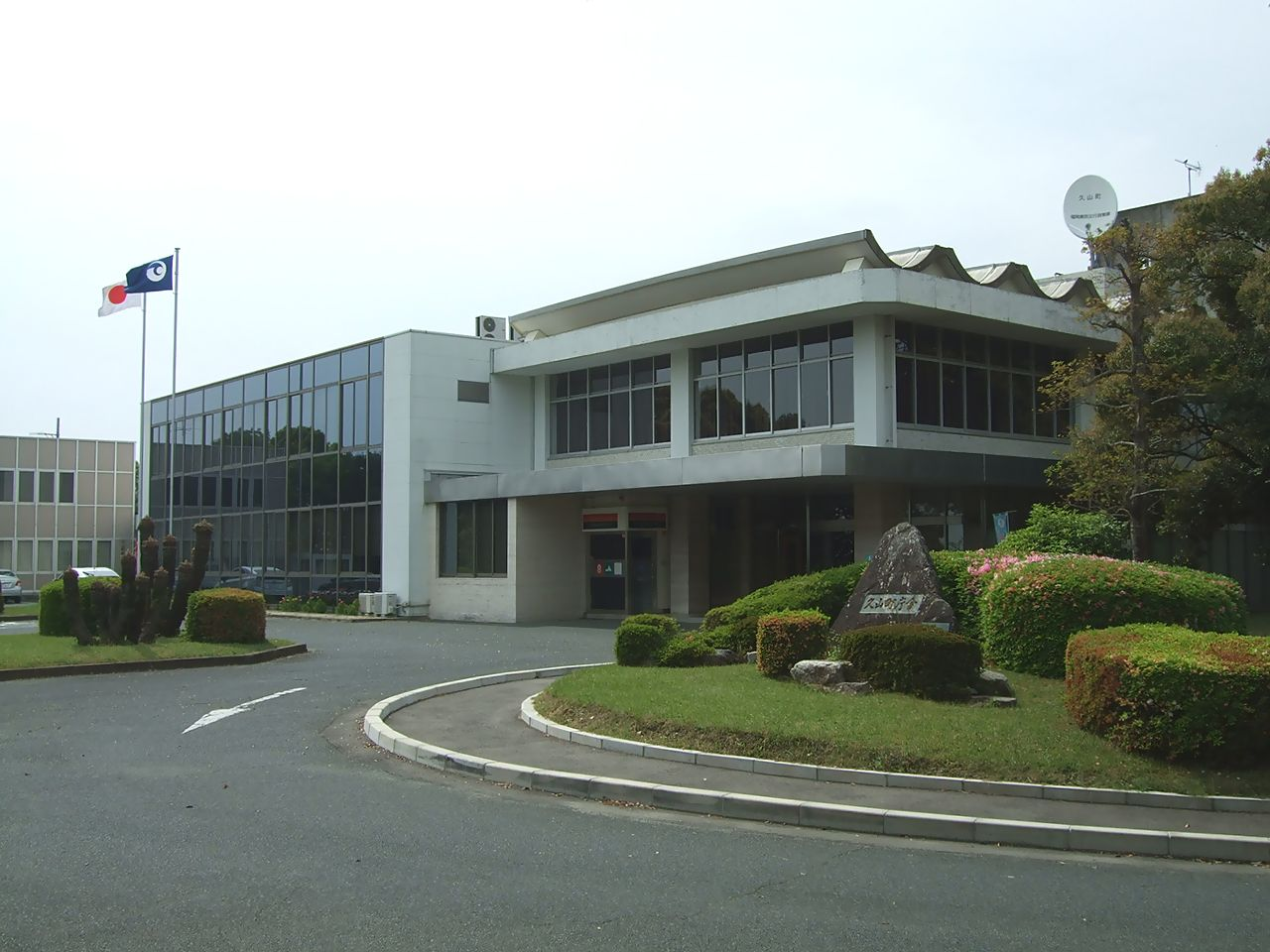
- Hisayama Town Hall

- Flag Emblem
- Interactive map of Hisayama
- Location in Japan
- Coordinates: 33°38′48″N 130°30′00″E
- Country: Japan
- Region: Kyushu
- Prefecture: Fukuoka
- District: Kasuya

Area
  - Total: 37.44 km^{2} (14.46 sq mi)

Population (February 29, 2024)
  - Total: 9,355
  - Density: 249.9/km^{2} (647.2/sq mi)
- Time zone: UTC+09:00 (JST)
- City hall address: 3632 Kubara, Hisayama-cho, Kasuya-gun, Fukuoka-ken 811-2501
- Website: Official website
- Symbols
- Flower: Calanthe discolor
- Tree: Zelkova serrata

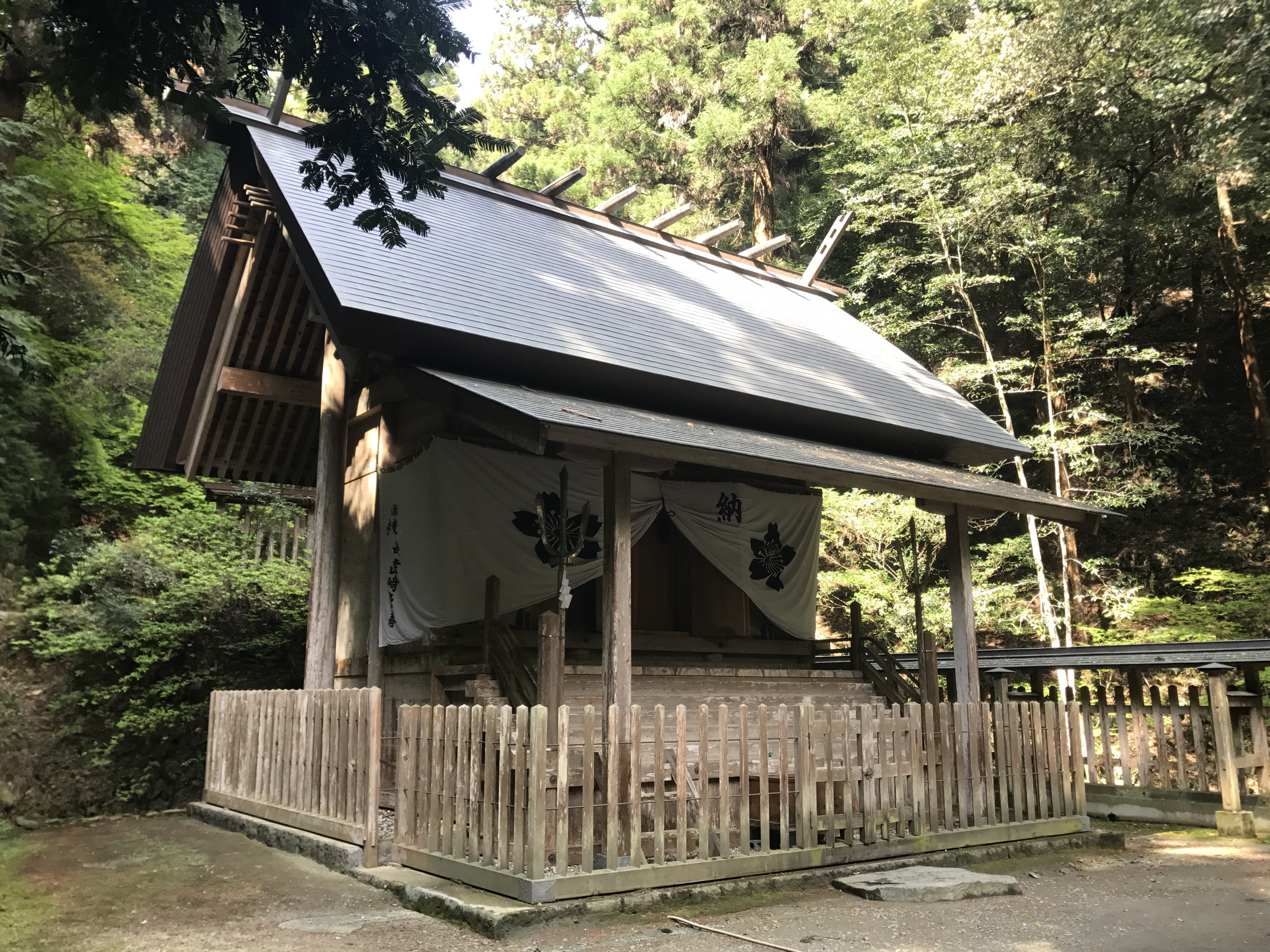
Tenshoko Dai-Jingu in Hisayama

Hisayama (久山町, Hisayama-machi) is a town located in Kasuya District, Fukuoka Prefecture, Japan. As of 29 February 2024, the town had an estimated population of 9355 in 3836 households, and a population density of 250 persons per km^{2}. The total area of the town is 37.44 km^{2} (14.46 sq mi)

== Geography ==
Hisayama is located slightly west of the center of Fukuoka Prefecture, adjacent to Fukuoka City. The eastern part of the town is part of the Sangun Mountain Range, and is mostly forested.

=== Neighboring municipalities ===
Fukuoka Prefecture

- Fukuoka
- Kasuya
- Koga
- Miyawaka
- Sasaguri
- Shingū

=== Climate ===
Hisayama has a humid subtropical climate (Köppen Cfa) characterized by warm summers and cool winters with light to no snowfall. The average annual temperature in Hisayama is 15.2 °C. The average annual rainfall is 1599 mm with September as the wettest month. The temperatures are highest on average in August, at around 26.5 °C, and lowest in January, at around 4.4 °C.

=== Demographics ===
Per Japanese census data, the population of Hisayama is as shown below.

Historical population
Year	Pop.	±%
1940	4,404	—
1950	6,021	+36.7%
1960	6,521	+8.3%
1970	7,154	+9.7%
1980	7,657	+7.0%
1990	7,524	−1.7%
2000	7,640	+1.5%
2010	8,377	+9.6%
2020	9,068	+8.2%

== History ==
The area of Hisayama was part of ancient Chikuzen Province. During the Edo Period, the area was under the control of Fukuoka Domain. After the Meiji restoration, the villages of Kubara and Yamade was established with the creation of the modern municipalities system on April 1, 1889. The two villages merged on September 30, 1956, to form the town of Hisayama.

== Government ==
Hisayama has a mayor-council form of government with a directly elected mayor and a unicameral town council of 10 members. Hisayama, together with the other municipalities in Kasuya District contributes three members to the Fukuoka Prefectural Assembly. In terms of national politics, the city is part of the Fukuoka 4th district of the lower house of the Diet of Japan.

== Economy ==
The local economy is largely based on agriculture and logistics.

== Education ==
Hisayama has two public elementary schools and one public junior high school operated by the town government. The town does not have a high school.

== Transportation ==
=== Railways ===
The Kyushu Shinkansen tracks pass through Hisayama, but the town has no passenger railway service. The nearest train stations are Sasaguri Station and Kadomatsu Station on the JR Kyushu Sasaguri Line.

=== Highways ===
The Kyushu Expressway passes through the western part of the town from north to south, but there are no interchanges or national highways within the town.

== Local attractions ==
- Shirasan ruins, National Historic Site
