= Kadomatsu Station =

Railway station in Kasuya, Fukuoka Prefecture, Japan

JC 05 Kadomatsu Station 門松駅
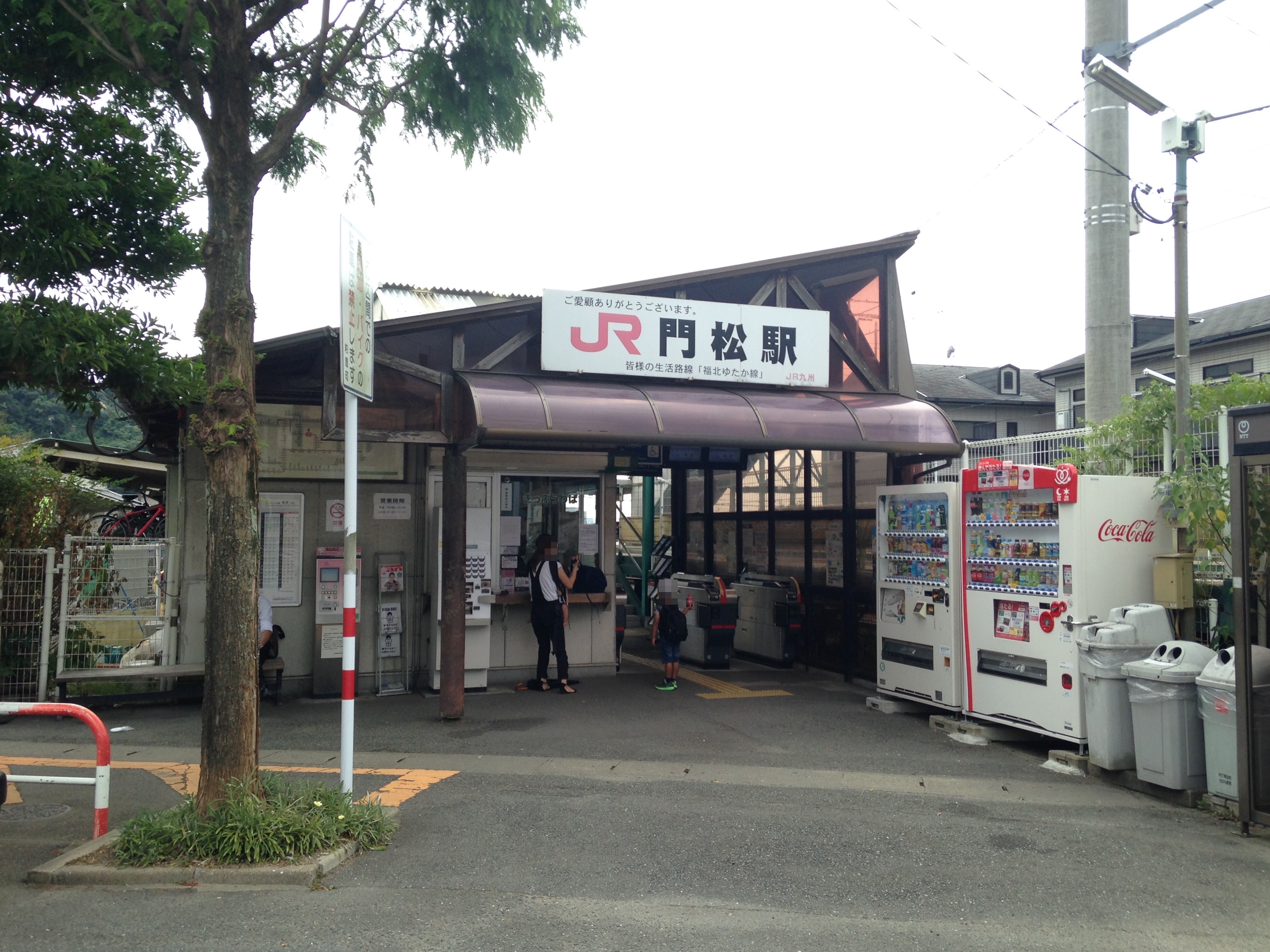
- Kadomatsu Station in 2016

General information
- Location: Okuma, Kasuya-machi, Kasuya-gun, Fukuoka-ken 811-2302; Japan
- Coordinates: 33°37′13″N 130°29′48″E
- Operator: JR Kyushu
- Line: JC Sasaguri Line
- Distance: 7.7 km from Yoshizuka
- Platforms: 2 side platforms
- Tracks: 2

Construction
- Structure type: At grade
- Cycle facilities: Bike shed

Other information
- Status: Staffed ticket window (outsourced)
- Website: Official website

History
- Opened: 9 March 1989

Passengers
- FY2020: 1132 daily
- Rank: 124th (among JR Kyushu stations)

Services
Preceding station	JR Kyushu	Following station
Chōjabaru towards Hakata	Sasaguri Line Local	Sasaguri towards Keisen
Location
- Location within Fukuoka Prefecture Location within Japan

Kadomatsu Station (門松駅, Kadomatsu-eki) is a passenger railway station located in the town of Kasuya, Fukuoka Prefecture, Japan. It is operated by JR Kyushu.

== Lines ==
The station is served by the Sasaguri Line and is located 7.7 km from the starting point of the line at Yoshizuka. The station is sometimes depicted on maps and timetables as part of the Fukuhoku Yutaka Line, of which the Sasaguri Line is a component.

== Station layout ==
The station consists of two side platforms serving two tracks. The station building houses a waiting area and s staffed ticket window. Access to the opposite side platform is by means of a covered footbridge. A bike shed is provided outside the station.

Management of the station has been outsourced to the JR Kyushu Tetsudou Eigyou Co., a wholly owned subsidiary of JR Kyushu specialising in station services. It staffs the ticket window which is equipped with a POS machine but without a Midori no Madoguchi facility.

=== Platforms ===
1	■ JC Sasaguri Line	for Sasaguri and Iizuka
2	■ JC Sasaguri Line	for Yoshizuka and Hakata

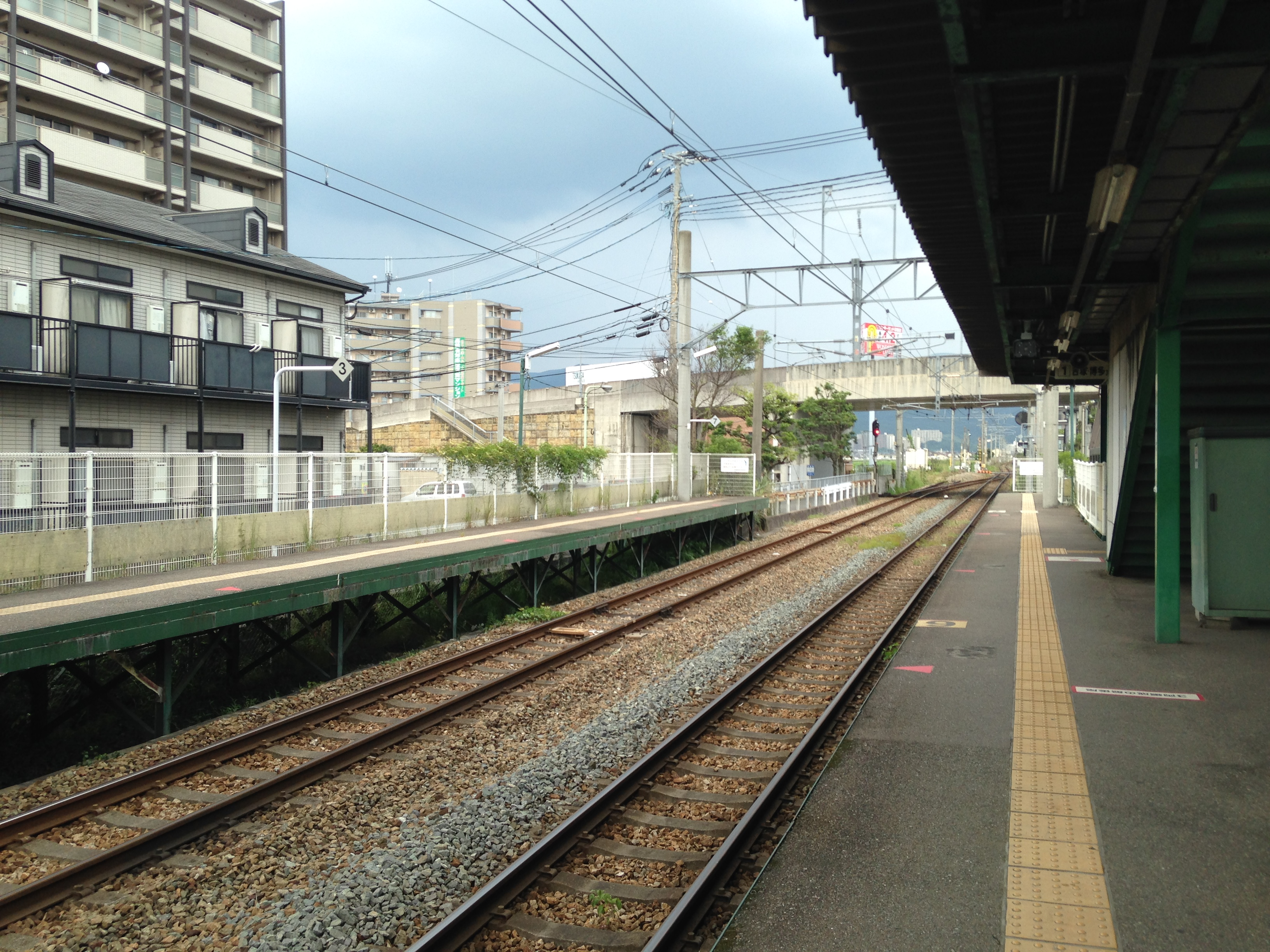
A view of the platforms and tracks.

== History ==
The station was opened by Japanese National Railways (JNR) on 9 March 1987 as an additional temporary stop on the existing Sasaguri Line track. With the privatization of JNR on 1 April 1987, JR Kyushu took over control of the station and upgraded it to a full station.

== Passenger statistics ==
In fiscal 2020, there was a daily average of 1132 boarding passengers at this station, making it the 124th busiest station on the JR Kyushu network.。

== Surrounding area ==
The station is located at the eastern end of Kasuya Town. Fukuoka Prefectural Route 607 runs parallel to the Sasaguri Line about 100 meters south of the station, and Fukuoka Prefectural Route 35 and the Sasaguri Line intersect at a grade level just east of the station

== See also ==
- List of railway stations in Japan
