= Yusu Station (Fukuoka) =

Railway station in Kasuya, Fukuoka Prefecture, Japan

JC 02 Yusu Station 柚須駅
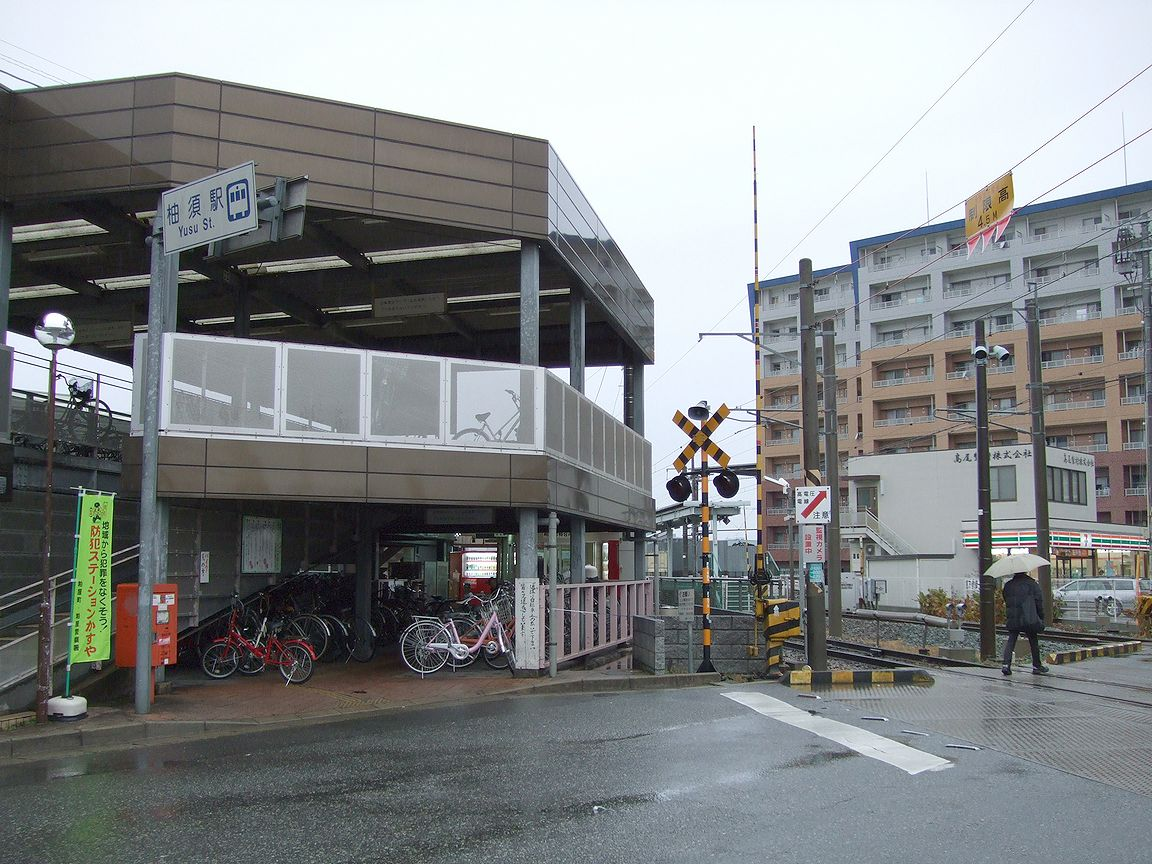
- Yusu Station in 2008

General information
- Location: 139-5 Yusu, Kasuya-machi, Kasuya-gun, Fukuoka-ken 811-2305; Japan
- Coordinates: 33°36′48″N 130°26′42″E
- Operator: JR Kyushu
- Line: JC Sasaguri Line
- Distance: 2.5 km (1.6 mi) from Yoshizuka
- Platforms: 2 side platforms
- Tracks: 2

Construction
- Structure type: At grade
- Cycle facilities: Bike shed

Other information
- Status: Staffed ticket window with Midori no Madoguchi (outsourced)
- Station code: JC02
- Website: Official website

History
- Opened: 13 March 1988; 38 years ago

Passengers
- FY2020: 3450 daily
- Rank: 48th (among JR Kyushu stations)

Services
Preceding station	JR Kyushu	Following station
Yoshizuka JC 01 towards Hakata	Sasaguri Line Local	Harumachi JC 03 towards Keisen
Location
- Location within Fukuoka Prefecture Location within Japan

Yusu Station (柚須駅, Yusu-eki) is a passenger railway station located in the town of Kasuya, Fukuoka Prefecture, Japan. It is operated by JR Kyushu.

== Lines ==
The station is served by the Sasaguri Line and is located 2.5 km from the starting point of the line at Yoshizuka. The station is sometimes depicted on maps and timetables as part of the Fukuhoku Yutaka Line, of which the Sasaguri Line is a component.

== Station layout ==
The station consists of two side platforms serving two tracks. The original configuration had been an island platform serving two tracks but in late 2016, another side platform had been built on the other side of track 1 and platform 1 was moved across. The former platform 1 on the island was fenced off, leaving platform 2 using the former island as a side platform. The station building is a two-storey structure. The whole of the top level and part of the bottom level serves as designated parking areas for bicycles. A small waiting room and a staffed ticket window is located on the lower level. Platform 1 is directly access from the station building while platform 2 is access by means of a level crossing.

Management of the station has been outsourced to the JR Kyushu Tetsudou Eigyou Co., a wholly owned subsidiary of JR Kyushu specialising in station services. It staffs the ticket window which is equipped with a Midori no Madoguchi facility.

=== Platforms ===
1	■ JC Sasaguri Line	for Yoshizuka and Hakata
2	■ JC Sasaguri Line	for Keisen and Iizuka

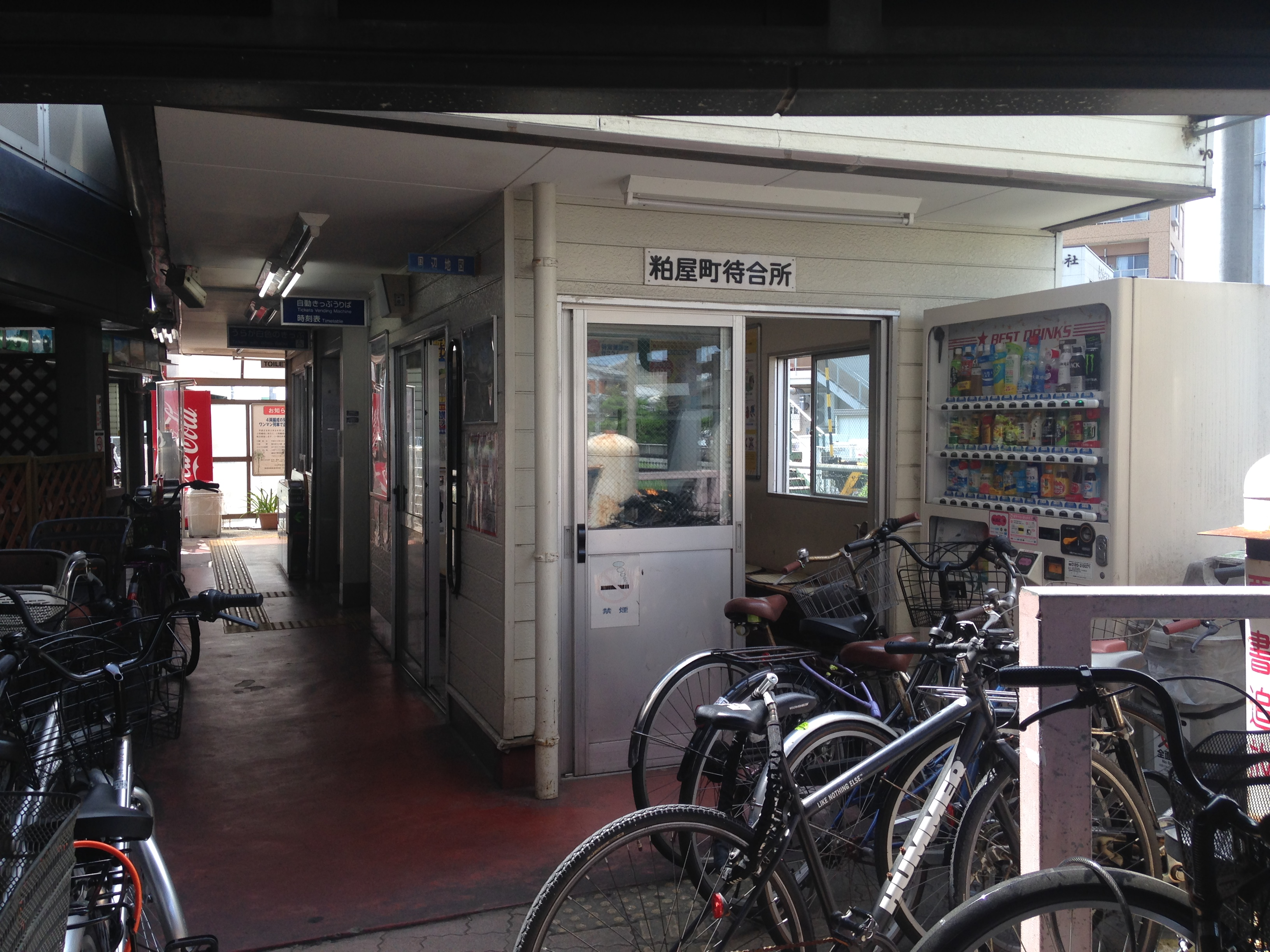
Station waiting room. The ticket window is down the narrow corridor. Note the area in the foreground is for the parking of bicycles.

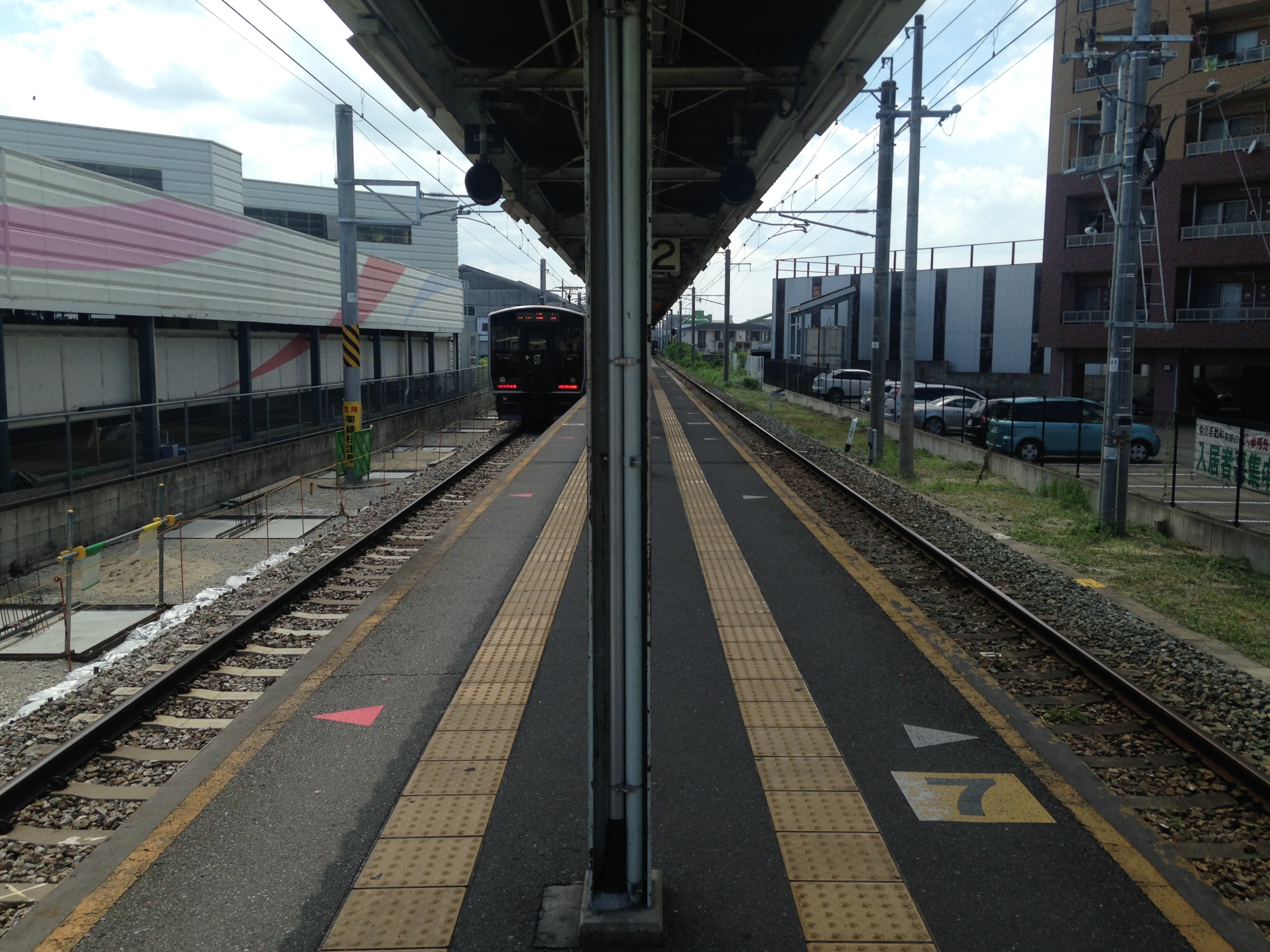
Station platforms in the former island configuration.

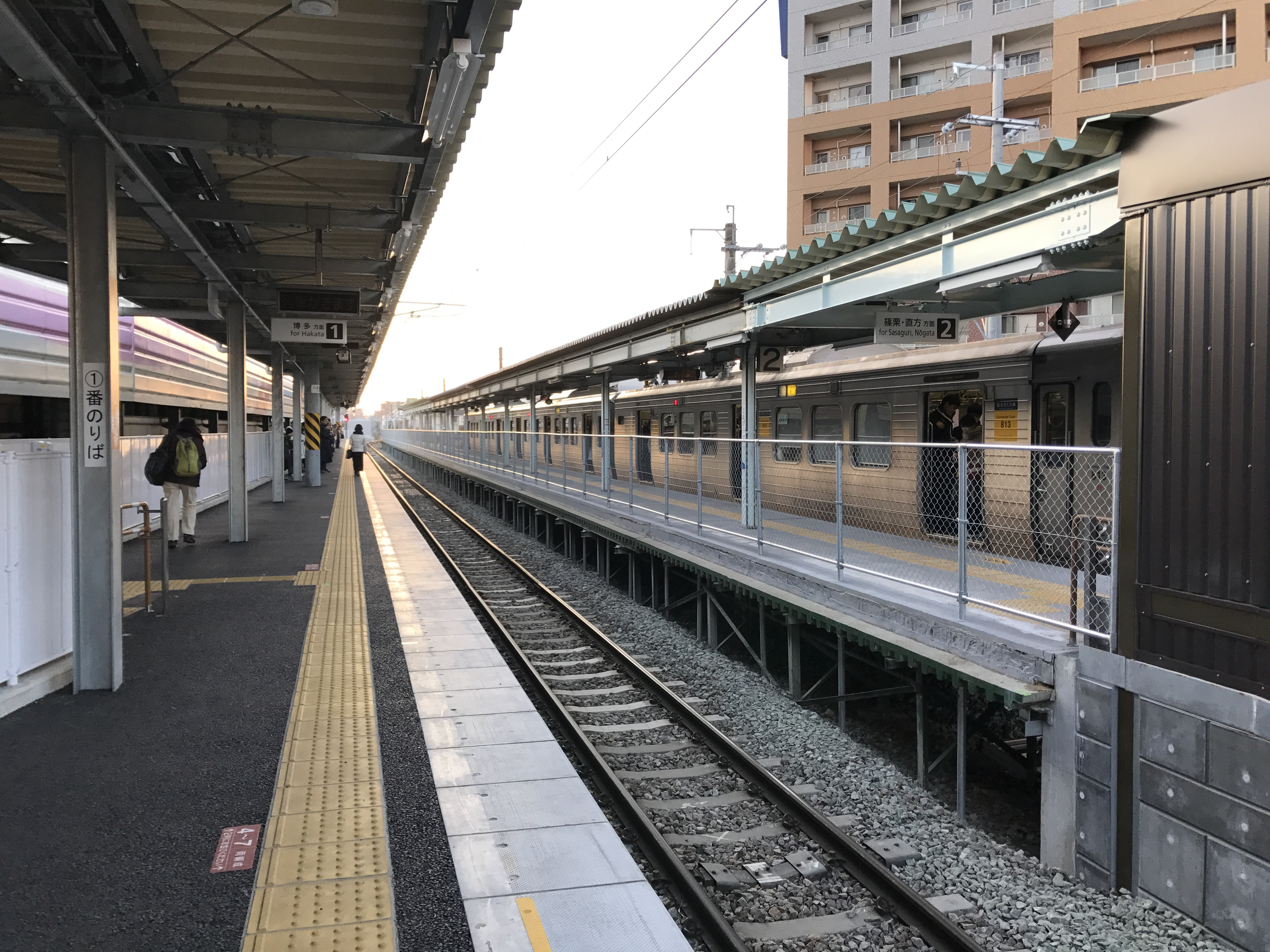
Station platforms now configured as two side platforms. Note the fence on the former island platform and the rough edges where the concrete of the old platform 1 has been truncated.

== History ==
The station was opened by JR Kyushu on 13 March 1988 as an additional station on the existing track of the Sasaguri Line.

== Passenger statistics ==
In fiscal 2020, there was a daily average of 3450 boarding passengers at this station, making it the 48th busiest station on the JR Kyushu network.。

== Surrounding area ==
The area around the station is at the western end of Kasuya, and is home to many factories and businesses.

- Fukuoka City Hakozaki Kiyomatsu Junior High School

== See also ==
- List of railway stations in Japan
