= Fukuhoku Yutaka Line =

Japanese railway line

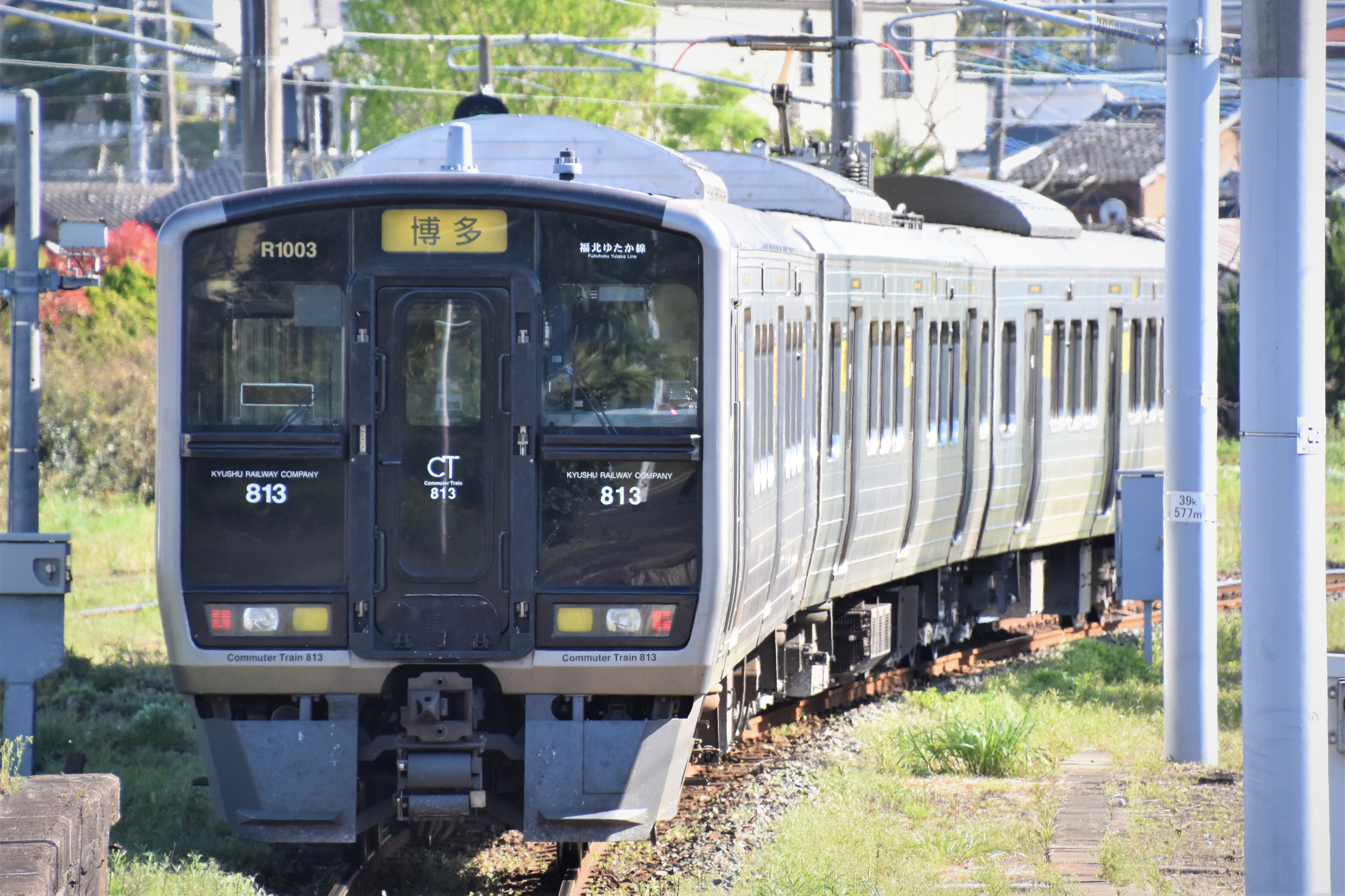
- JR Kyushu 813 series EMU operating on the Fukuhoku Yutaka Line near Iizuka Station

Overview
- Service type: Regional rail
- Locale: Fukuoka Prefecture
- First service: 19 June 1904; 121 years ago
- Current operator: JR Kyushu
- Former operator: Japanese National Railways

Route
- Termini: Orio; Hakata
- Stops: 27
- Distance travelled: 61.4 km (38.2 mi)
- Lines used: Chikuhō Main Line; Sasaguri Line; Kagoshima Main Line

Technical
- Track gauge: 1,067 mm (3 ft 6 in)
- Electrification: Overhead line, 20 kV 60 Hz AC
Route map
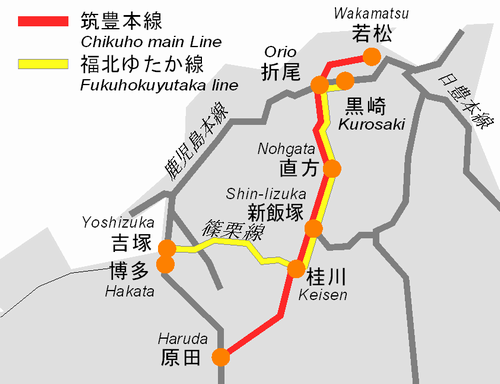
- Fukuhoku Yutaka Line (yellow)

The Fukuhoku Yutaka Line (Japanese: 福北ゆたか線, Hepburn: Fukuhoku-Yutaka-sen) is a service name used by the Kyushu Railway Company (JR Kyushu) for a train service in Fukuoka Prefecture, Japan. The service operates over three different railway lines, covering a distance of 61.4 kilometres (38.2 mi) between Kurosaki Station and Hakata Station.

The Fukuhoku Yutaka Line operates over the following railway lines:

- Chikuhō Main Line, between Orio Station and Keisen Station – 34.5 kilometres (21.4 mi)
- Sasaguri Line, between Keisen Station and Yoshizuka Station – 25.1 kilometres (15.6 mi)
- Kagoshima Main Line, between Yoshizuka Station and Hakata Station – 1.8 kilometres (1.1 mi)

== Stations ==
Legend:

| ● | All trains stop |
| ▲ | Some trains stop |
| ｜ | All trains pass |

| No. | Station | Distance (km) | Rapid | Transfers | Location | |
|---|---|---|---|---|---|---|
| JC 26 | Orio | 0 | ● | JA Kagoshima Main Line (JA19); JE Wakamatsu Line (JE01) | Yahatanishi-ku | Fukuoka; Prefecture |
| JC 25 | Higashi-Mizumaki | 2.7 | ▲ | | Mizumaki, Onga District | Fukuoka; Prefecture |
| JC 24 | Nakama | 4.1 | ▲ | | Nakama | Fukuoka; Prefecture |
| JC 23 | Chikuzen Habu | 5.6 | ▲ | | Nakama | Fukuoka; Prefecture |
| JC 22 | Kurate | 7.9 | ▲ | | Kurate, Kurate District | Fukuoka; Prefecture |
| JC 21 | Chikuzen Ueki | 10.4 | ▲ | | Nōgata | Fukuoka; Prefecture |
| JC 20 | Shinnyū | 12.0 | ▲ | | Nōgata | Fukuoka; Prefecture |
| JC 19 | Nōgata | 14.0 | ● | Ita Line | Nōgata | Fukuoka; Prefecture |
| JC 18 | Katsuno | 16.7 | ｜ | | Kotake, Kurate District | Fukuoka; Prefecture |
| JC 17 | Kotake | 20.5 | ● | | Kotake, Kurate District | Fukuoka; Prefecture |
| JC 16 | Namazuta | 23.9 | ● | | Iizuka | Fukuoka; Prefecture |
| JC 15 | Urata | 25.4 | ● | | Iizuka | Fukuoka; Prefecture |
| JC 14 | Shin Iizuka | 26.8 | ● | JJ Gotōji Line (JJ01) | Iizuka | Fukuoka; Prefecture |
| JC 13 | Iizuka | 28.6 | ● | | Iizuka | Fukuoka; Prefecture |
| JC 12 | Tentō | 31.5 | ● | | Iizuka | Fukuoka; Prefecture |
| JC 11 | Keisen | 34.5 | ● | JG Haruda Line (JG01) | Keisen | Fukuoka; Prefecture |
| JC 10 | Chikuzen Daibu | 37.7 | ● | | Iizuka | Fukuoka; Prefecture |
| JC 09 | Kurōbaru | 39.7 | ｜ | | Iizuka | Fukuoka; Prefecture |
| JC 08 | Kido Nanzōin-mae | 44.7 | ● | | Sasaguri | Fukuoka; Prefecture |
| JC 07 | Chikuzen Yamate | 46.2 | ｜ | | Sasaguri | Fukuoka; Prefecture |
| JC 06 | Sasaguri | 49.3 | ● | | Sasaguri | Fukuoka; Prefecture |
| JC 05 | Kadomatsu | 51.9 | ▲ | | Kasuya | Fukuoka; Prefecture |
| JC 04 | Chōjabaru | 53.9 | ● | JD Kashii Line (JD11) | Kasuya | Fukuoka; Prefecture |
| JC 03 | Harumachi | 54.6 | ▲ | | Kasuya | Fukuoka; Prefecture |
| JC 02 | Yusu | 57.1 | ● | | Kasuya | Fukuoka; Prefecture |
| JC 01 | Yoshizuka | 59.6 | ● | JA Kagoshima Main Line (JA01) | Hakata-ku, Fukuoka | Fukuoka; Prefecture |
| 00 | Hakata | 61.4 | ● | San'yō Shinkansen; Hakataminami Line; Kyūshū Shinkansen; Relay Kamome (Nishi Kyushu Shinkansen connection); JA JB Kagoshima Main Line (JA00/JB00); Kūkō Line (K11); Nanakuma Line (N18) | Hakata-ku, Fukuoka | Fukuoka; Prefecture |
