= Ae Kanga ruins =

Archaeological site in Fukuoka, Japan

- 阿恵官衙遺跡 (Japanese)
- Ae Kanga ruins Ae Kanga ruins (Japan)
- 33°36′51.8″N 130°27′30.5″E
- Periods: Asuka – Nara period
- Location: Kasuya, Fukuoka, Japan
- Region: Kyushu

History
- Built: 7th to 8th century AD

Site notes
- Elevation: 27 m (89 ft)
- National Historic Site of Japan

The Ae Kanga ruins (阿恵官衙遺跡, Ae Kanga iseki) is an archaeological site with the ruins of an Asuka to Nara period government administrative complex located in what is now the town of Kasuya in Fukuoka prefecture in northern Kyushu, Japan. The site has been protected as a National Historic Site from 2020.

== Overview ==
In the Asuka period to Nara period, after the establishment of a centralized government under the Ritsuryō system, local rule over the provinces was standardized under a kokufu (provincial capital), and each province was divided into smaller administrative districts, known as (郡, gun, kōri), composed of two to 20 townships in 715 AD. Each of the units had an administrative complex, or kanga (官衙遺跡) built on a semi-standardized layout based on contemporary Chinese design, similar to that of the kokufu, but on a much smaller scale. With a square layout or rectangular layout, each had office buildings for administration, taxation, and security, as well as granaries for tax rice and other taxable produce. In the periphery there was typically a Buddhist temple with some official standing. This system collapsed with the growth of feudalism in the Late Heian period, and the location of many of the kanga is now lost.

The Ae Kanga ruins are located near the coast of Hakata Bay and were discovered during excavations from 2013 to 2016 at the Haramachi Farm attached to the Faculty of Agriculture, Kyushu University. The ruins consist of the foundations of the government office complex itself, a warehouse complex for storing tax rice, and an ancient road, which were found in good condition. Artifacts include ink stones, which were used by officials. In 2023, the remains of one of the largest pit dwellings in the prefecture were discovered across from the site. From these remains, it is believed that this site was the remains of the kanga constructed in the late 7th century to 8th century as the headquarters of "Kasuya no kōri" which appears in ancient records. The name also appears in the inscription on a bell dated 698, which is in the possession of Myōshin-ji in Kyoto. The inscription also gives the name of the "kōri-no-miyatsuko" at the time, a man named "Hirokuni", who would have worked at the Ae Kanga. This is one of the few instances were the name of an Asuka period local administrator is known.

== See also ==
- List of Historic Sites of Japan (Fukuoka)
