= Sasaguri Line =

Railway line in Fukuoka Prefecture, Japan

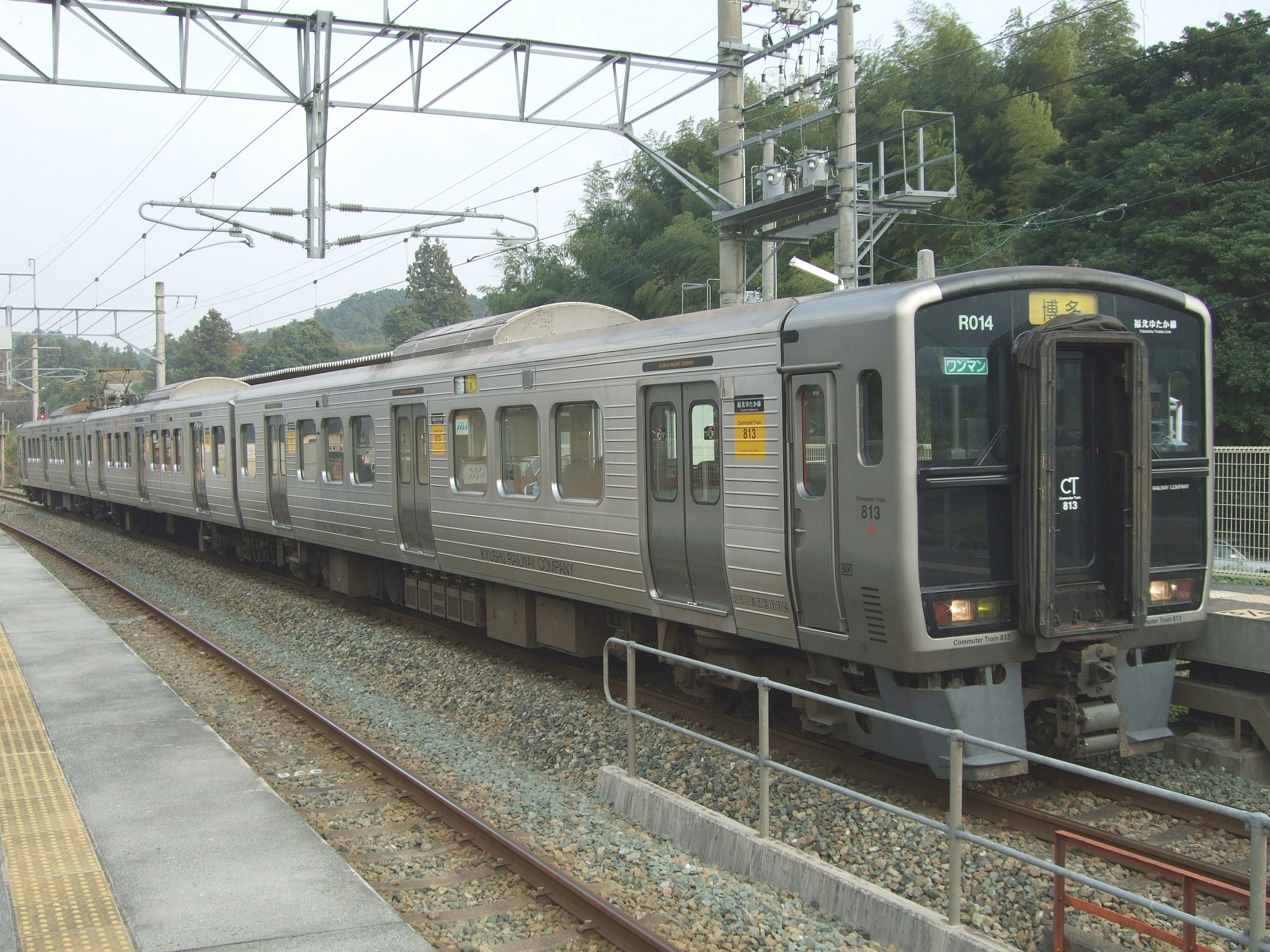
- JR Kyushu series 813-100 EMU

Overview
- Owner: JR Kyushu
- Locale: Fukuoka Prefecture
- Termini: Keisen; Yoshizuka
- Stations: 11
- Color on map: Yellow

Service
- Type: Regional rail
- Operator(s): JR Kyushu

History
- Opened: 19 June 1904; 121 years ago

Technical
- Line length: 25.1 km (15.6 mi)
- Number of tracks: 1
- Track gauge: 1,067 mm (3 ft 6 in)
- Electrification: Overhead line, 20 kV 60 Hz AC
- Operating speed: 100 km/h (62 mph)
- Signalling: Single-track automatic closing block
- Train protection system: ATS-DK
Route map
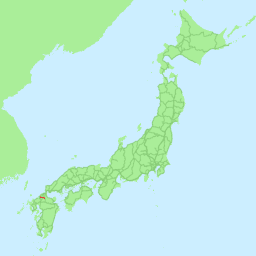

Sasaguri Line (篠栗線, Sasaguri-sen) is a railway line in Japan operated by Kyushu Railway Company (JR Kyushu). It connects Keisen Station in Keisen, Fukuoka with Yoshizuka Station in Fukuoka, Fukuoka.

== Stations ==
Legend:

●	All trains stop
｜	All trains pass

No.	Station	Distance (km)	Rapid	Transfers	Location	
↑ Through services to/from JC 26 Orio via the Chikuhō Main Line ↑
JC 11	Keisen	0.0	●	JG Haruda Line (JG01)	Keisen	Fukuoka; Prefecture
JC 10	Chikuzen Daibu	3.2	●		Iizuka	Fukuoka; Prefecture
JC 09	Kurōbaru	5.2	｜		Iizuka	Fukuoka; Prefecture
JC 08	Kido Nanzōin-mae	10.2	●		Sasaguri	Fukuoka; Prefecture
JC 07	Chikuzen Yamate	11.7	｜		Sasaguri	Fukuoka; Prefecture
JC 06	Sasaguri	14.8	●		Sasaguri	Fukuoka; Prefecture
JC 05	Kadomatsu	17.4	｜		Kasuya	Fukuoka; Prefecture
JC 04	Chōjabaru	19.4	●	JD Kashii Line (JD11)	Kasuya	Fukuoka; Prefecture
JC 03	Harumachi	20.1	｜		Kasuya	Fukuoka; Prefecture
JC 02	Yusu	22.6	｜		Kasuya	Fukuoka; Prefecture
JC 01	Yoshizuka	25.1	●	JA Kagoshima Main Line (JA01)	Hakata-ku, Fukuoka	Fukuoka; Prefecture
↓ Through services to/from 00 Hakata via the Kagoshima Main Line ↓

== History ==
The Kyushu Railway Co. opened the Yoshizuka - Sasaguri section in 1904, and extended it to Hakata with a line paralleling the Kagoshima Main Line the following year. The company was nationalised in 1907.

In 1911 the Kagoshima Main line was duplicated utilising the parallel line, and the junction between the lines became Yoshizuka. Petrol railcars were introduced on the line in 1936.

In 1968 the line was extended from Sasaguri to Katsura (on the Chikuho Main Line), with freight services commencing on that section in 1970. Freight service on the entire line ceased in 1984.

The line was electrified in 2001.

=== Former connecting lines ===
Yusu Station: The 14 km Katsuta Line was opened by the Chikuzen Sangu Railway Co. to Chikuzenkatsuta between 1918 and 1919. A connection to Sakado on the Kashii Line opened in 1942, and the line was nationalised in 1944. Freight service ceased in 1981, and the line closed in 1985.

== See also ==
- Fukuhoku Yutaka Line
