= Sasaguri Station =

Railway station in Sasaguri, Fukuoka Prefecture, Japan

JC 06 Sasaguri Station 篠栗駅
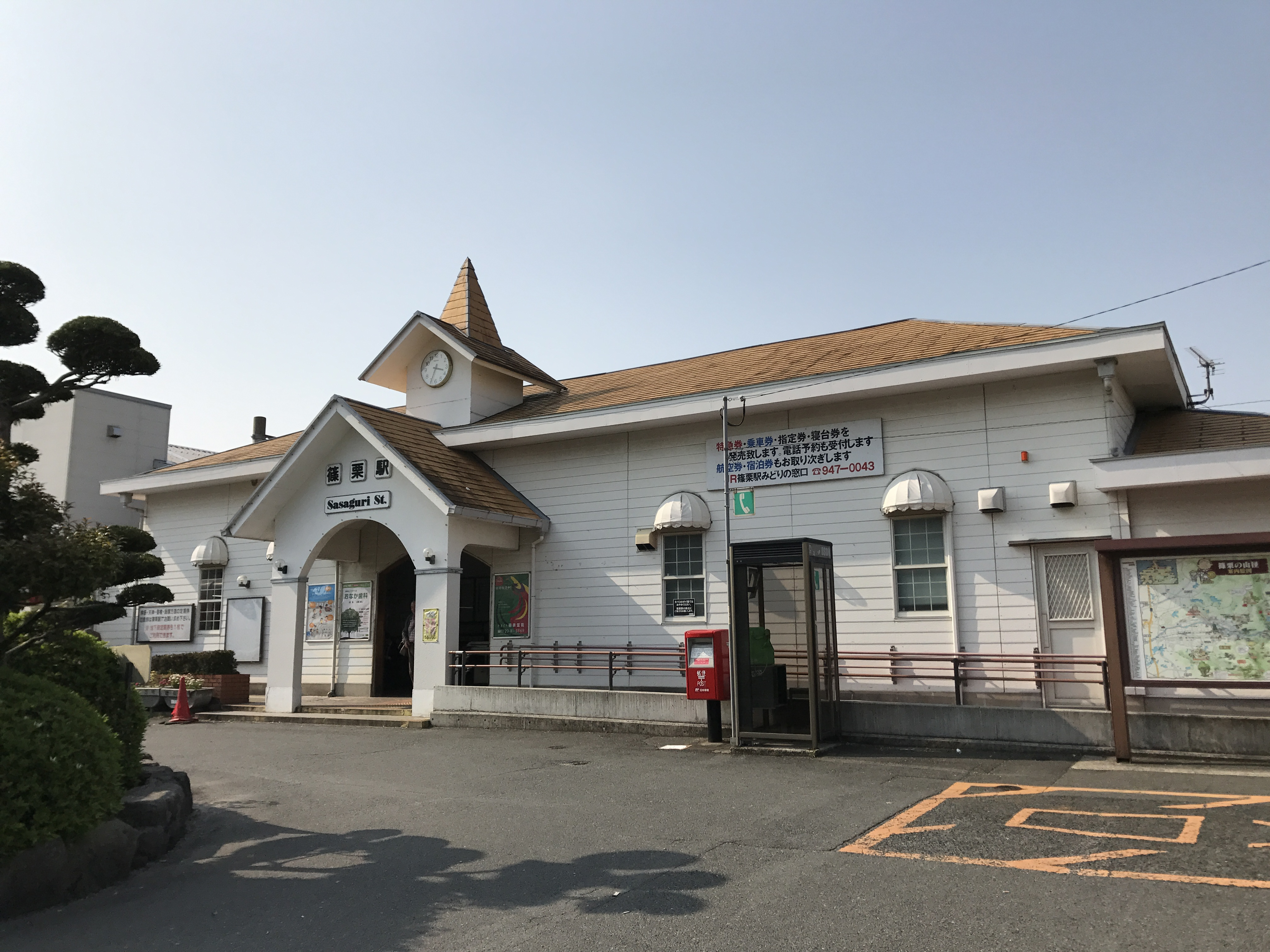
- Sasaguri Station

General information
- Location: 1-1-15 Chuo, Sasaguri-cho, Kasuya-gun, Fukuoka-ken 811-2405; Japan
- Coordinates: 33°37′26.24″N 130°31′29.21″E
- Operator: JR Kyushu
- Line: JC Sasaguri Line
- Platforms: 1 side + 1 island

Other information
- Status: Staffed ( Midori no Madoguchi)
- Website: Official website

History
- Opened: 16 June 1904

Passengers
- FY2020: 3951 daily
- Rank: 41st (among JR Kyushu stations)

Services
Preceding station	JR Kyushu	Following station
Kadomatsu towards Hakata	Sasaguri Line Local	Chikuzen-Yamate towards Keisen
Location
- Location within Fukuoka Prefecture Location within Japan

Sasaguri Station (篠栗駅, Sasaguri-eki) is a passenger railway station located in the town of Sasaguri, Fukuoka Prefecture, Japan. It is operated by JR Kyushu.

== Lines ==
The station is served by the Sasaguri Line and is located10.3 km from the starting point of the line at Yoshizuka. The station is sometimes depicted on maps and timetables as part of the Fukuhoku Yutaka Line, of which the Sasaguri Line is a component.

== Layout ==
The station consists of a side platform and an island platform connected by a footbridge to small station building is located on the south side of the station. The station has a Midori no Madoguchi staffed ticket office.

=== Platforms ===
1	■ JC Sasaguri Line	for Yoshizuka and Hakata
2	■ JC Sasaguri Line	for Shin-Iizuka and Nōgata
3	■ JC Sasaguri Line	for Hakata. Shin-Iizuka and Nōgata

== History ==
The station was opened on 19 June 1904 by the privately run Kyushu Railway as the eastern terminus of a stretch of track from Yoshizuka. When the Kyushu Railway was nationalized on 1 July 1907, Japanese Government Railways (JGR) took over control of the station. On 12 October 1909, the station became part of the Sasaguri Line. On 25 May 1968, Sasaguri became a through-station when the Sasaguri Line was extended further eat to Keisen. With the privatization of Japanese National Railways (JNR), the successor of JGR, on 1 April 1987, JR Kyushu took over control of the station.

== Passenger statistics ==
In fiscal 2020, there was a daily average of 3951 boarding passengers at this station, making it the 41st busiest station on the JR Kyushu network.。

== Surrounding area ==
The area around the station is in the center of Sasaguri Town. Fukuoka Prefectural Route 607 runs parallel to the Sasaguri Line about 100 meters south of the station, and a shopping district has expanded around the station and this road.

- Sasaguri Town Hall

== See also ==
- List of railway stations in Japan
