= Kasuya, Fukuoka =

Kasuya 粕屋町
- Town
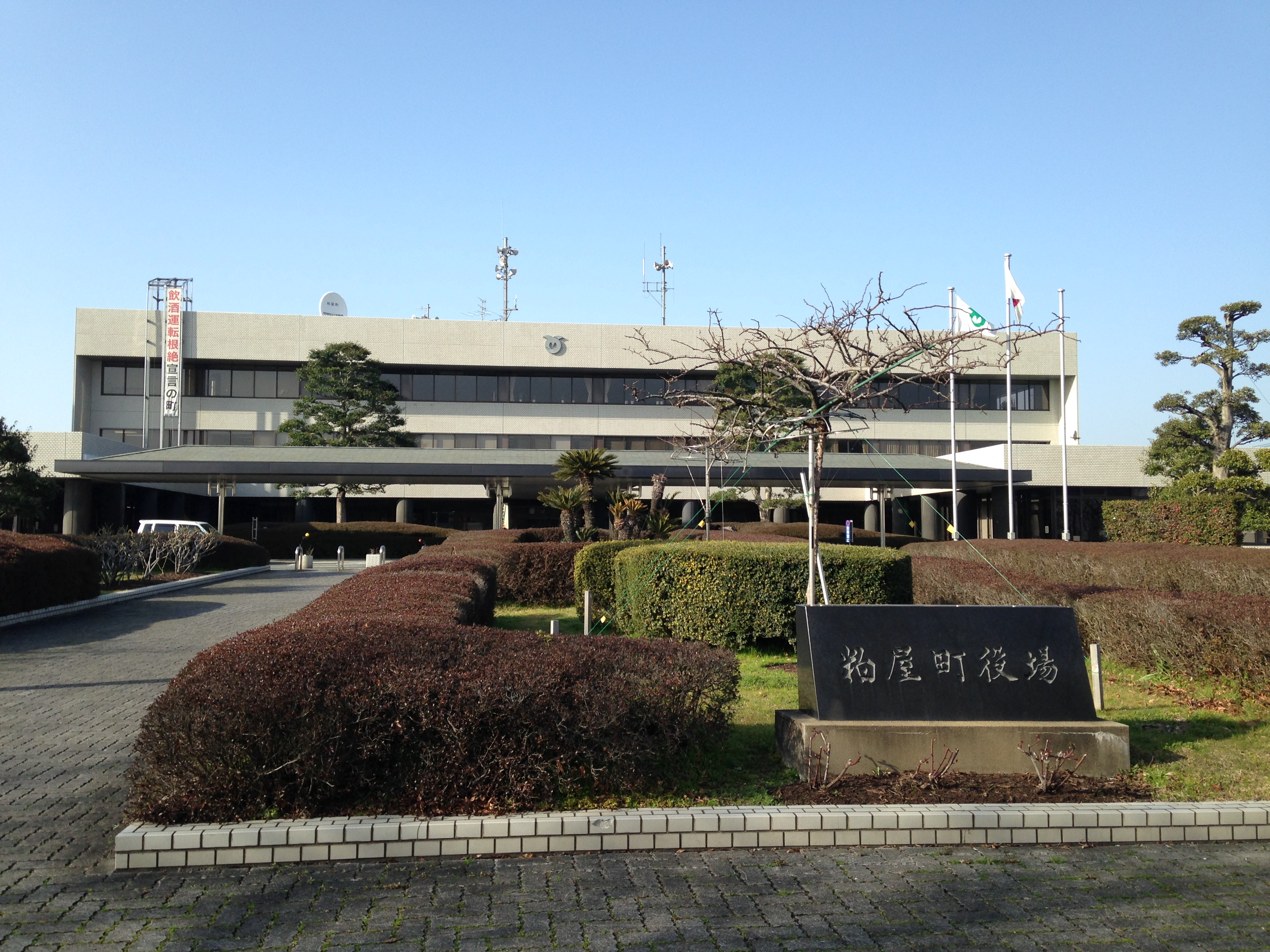
- Kasuya Town Hall

- Flag Chapter
- Interactive map of Kasuya
- Location in Japan
- Coordinates: 33°36′39″N 130°28′50″E
- Country: Japan
- Region: Kyushu
- Prefecture: Fukuoka
- District: Kasuya

Area
  - Total: 14.13 km^{2} (5.46 sq mi)

Population (March 31, 2024)
  - Total: 48,731
  - Density: 3,449/km^{2} (8,932/sq mi)
- Time zone: UTC+09:00 (JST)
- City hall address: 1-1-1 Kasuya-cho, Kasuya-gun, Fukuoka-ken 811-2392
- Website: Official website
- Symbols
- Flower: Rose and Cosmos
- Tree: Ilex rotunda

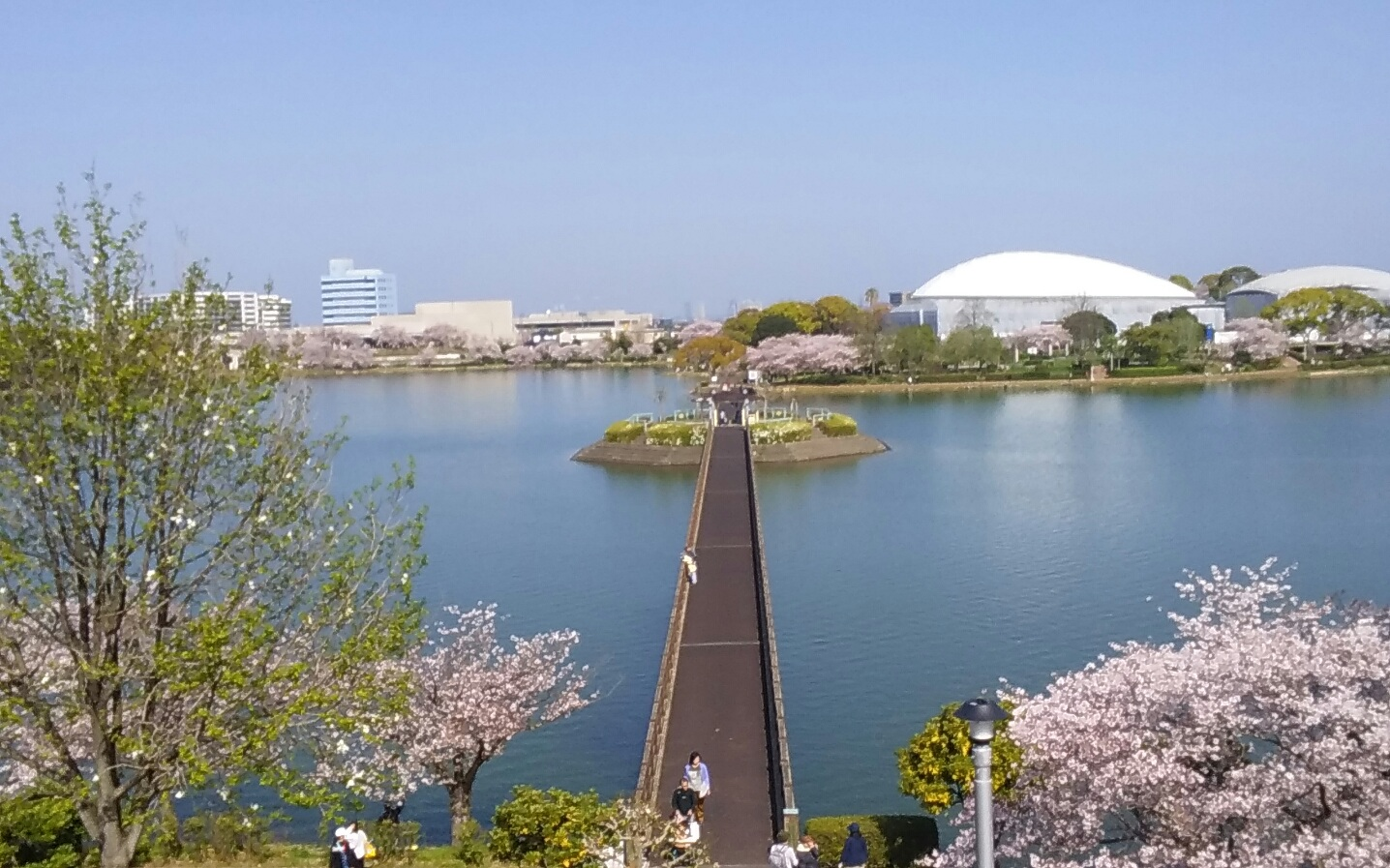
Kayoicho Park

Kasuya (粕屋町, Kasuya-machi) is a town located in Kasuya District, Fukuoka Prefecture, Japan. As of 31 March 2024, the town had an estimated population of 48,731 in 21,931 households, and a population density of 250 persons per km². The total area of the town is 14.13 km^{2} (5.46 sq mi)

== Geography ==
Kasuya is located in northwestern Fukuoka Prefecture, and borders Fukuoka City's Higashi Ward and Hakata Ward on the west side. The Tatara River flows east-west through the northern part of the town, and the Sue River flows northwest through the southern and western parts. The town is included in the Fukuoka Plain and the topography is generally flat, but there are slightly higher mountains at the north and east ends.There are several large and small reservoirs in the town, including Kayoicho Pond.

=== Neighboring municipalities ===
Fukuoka Prefecture

- Fukuoka
- Hisayama
- Sasaguri
- Shime
- Sue

=== Climate ===
Kasuya has a humid subtropical climate (Köppen Cfa) characterized by warm summers and cool winters with light to no snowfall. The average annual temperature in Kasuya is 15.2 °C. The average annual rainfall is 1766 mm with September as the wettest month. The temperatures are highest on average in August, at around 26.5 °C, and lowest in January, at around 4.4 °C.

=== Demographics ===
Per Japanese census data, the population of Kasuya is as shown below.

Historical population
Year	Pop.	±%
1940	7,679	—
1950	11,259	+46.6%
1960	12,524	+11.2%
1970	18,691	+49.2%
1980	26,810	+43.4%
1990	29,697	+10.8%
2000	34,811	+17.2%
2010	42,002	+20.7%
2020	48,190	+14.7%

== History ==
The area of Kasuya was part of ancient Chikuzen Province. During the Edo Period, the area was under the control of Fukuoka Domain. After the Meiji restoration, the villages of Okawa and Nakabaru were established with the creation of the modern municipalities system on April 1, 1889. The villages merged on March 31, 1957 to form the town of Kasuya.

== Government ==
Kasuya has a mayor-council form of government with a directly elected mayor and a unicameral town council of 16 members. Kasuya, together with the other municipalities in Kasuya District contributes three members to the Fukuoka Prefectural Assembly. In terms of national politics, the town is part of the Fukuoka 4th district of the lower house of the Diet of Japan.

== Economy ==
There used to be a coal mine in the northwestern part of town, but it closed in the 1960s. After that, an industrial park was established; however, the main focus of the local economy is on commerce with an increasing percentage of the working population commuting to nearby Fukuoka.

== Education ==
Kasuya has four public elementary schools and two public junior high schools operated by the town government. The town does not have a high school.

== Transportation ==
=== Railways ===
JR Kyushu - Kashii Line

JD Iga - Chōjabaru - Harumachi

JR Kyushu - Sasaguri Line

JC Kadomatsu - Chōjabaru - Harumachi - Yusu

=== Highways ===
- Kyushu Expressway
- National Route 201

== Local attractions ==
- Ae Kanga ruins, National Historic Site

== Notable people from Kasuya ==
- Isamu Chō, Imperial Japanese Army general
