= Yoshizuka Station =

Railway station in Fukuoka, Japan

JA 01 JC 01 Yoshizuka Station 吉塚駅
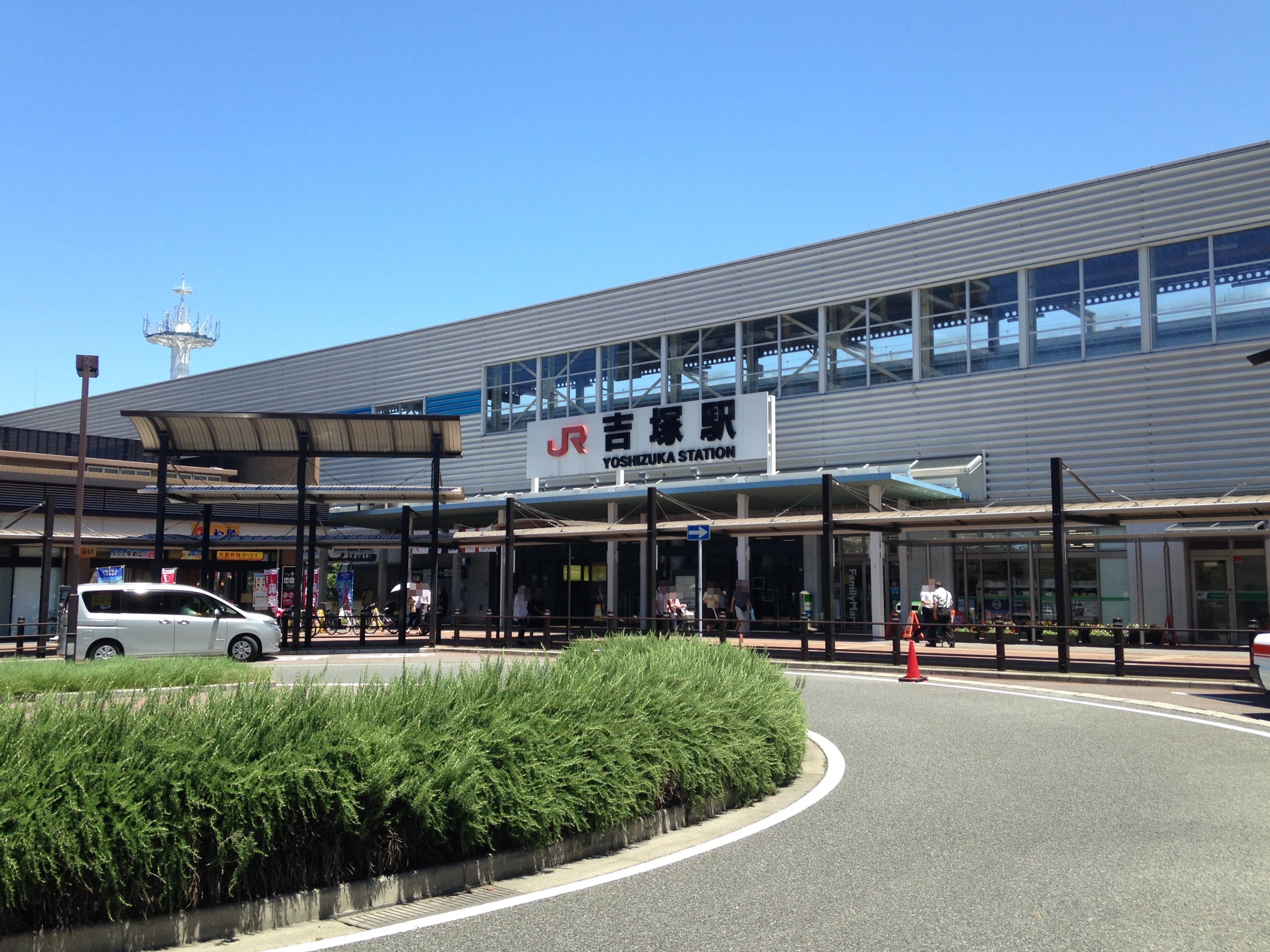
- Yoshizuka Station in 2016

General information
- Location: 13 Yoshizuka-honmachi, Hakata-ku, Fukuoka-shi, Fukuoka-ken; Japan
- Coordinates: 33°36′26″N 130°25′26″E
- Operator: JR Kyushu
- Lines: JA Kagoshima Main Line; JC Sasaguri Line (Fukuhoku Yutaka Line)
- Distance: 75.0 km from Mojikō (starting point of the Kagoshima Main Line); 0.0 km (station is the starting point of the Sasaguri Line)
- Platforms: 1 side platform + 2 island platforms
- Tracks: 5

Construction
- Structure type: Elevated

Other information
- Station code: JA01; JC01
- Website: Official website

History
- Opened: 19 June 1904; 122 years ago

Passengers
- FY2020: 12,524
- Rank: 5th (among JR Kyushu stations)

Services
Preceding station	JR Kyushu	Following station
Hakata 00 towards Kagoshima	Kagoshima Main Line Local	Hakozaki JA 02 towards Mojikō
Hakata 00 Terminus	Sasaguri Line Local	Yusu JC 02 towards Keisen
Location
- Location within Fukuoka Prefecture Location within Japan

Yoshizuka Station (吉塚駅, Yoshizuka-eki) is a passenger railway station located in Hakata-ku, Fukuoka, Fukuoka Prefecture, Japan. It is operated by JR Kyushu.

== Lines ==
The station is served by the Kagoshima Main Line and is located 75.0 km from the starting point of the line at Mojikō.

The station is also the northern terminus of the 25.1 kilometer Sasaguri Line to Keisen, which is also, with parts of other lines, collectively referred to on maps as the Fukuhoku Yutaka Line.

== Layout ==
The station consists of one side platform and two island platforms serving five elevated tracks, with the station building underneath. The station has a Midori no Madoguchi staffed ticket office.

=== Platforms ===
1	■ JA Kagoshima Main Line	for Kokura and Mojikō
2, 3	■ JA Kagoshima Main Line	for Hakata and Kurume
4	■ JC Chikuhō Main Line	for Chōjabaru, Keisen, Nōgata and Orio
5	■ JC Chikuhō Main Line	for Hakata

== History ==
The privately run Kyushu Railway had begun laying down its network on Kyushu in 1889 and by 1902 had a stretch of track from Moji (now Mojikō) southwards to Yatsushiro. Yoshizuka was opened as an added station on this existing stretch of track on 19 June 1904 between Hakozaki and Hakata. On the same day a stretch of track to Sasaguri was also opened. This track was later extended to Hakata on 16 February 1905. When the Kyushu Railway was nationalized on 1 July 1907, Japanese Government Railways (JGR) took over control of the station. On 12 October 1909, the station became part of the Hitoyoshi Main Line while the track from Hakata through Yoshizuka to Sasaguri was designated the Sasaguri Line. On 21 November 1909 the Hitoyoshi Main Line was renamed the Kagoshima Main Line. On 5 May 1911, Yoshizuka was designated the official start point of the Sasaguri Line. With the privatization of Japanese National Railways (JNR), the successor of JGR, on 1 April 1987, JR Kyushu took over control of the station.

== Passenger statistics ==
In fiscal 2020, the station was used by an average of 12,524 passengers daily (boarding passengers only), and it ranked 5th among the busiest stations of JR Kyushu.

== Surrounding area ==
- Fukuoka Prefectural Office
- Kyushu University Hospital

== See also ==
- List of railway stations in Japan
