= Keisen Station =

Railway station in Keisen, Fukuoka Prefecture, Japan

JC 11 JG 01 Keisen Station 桂川駅
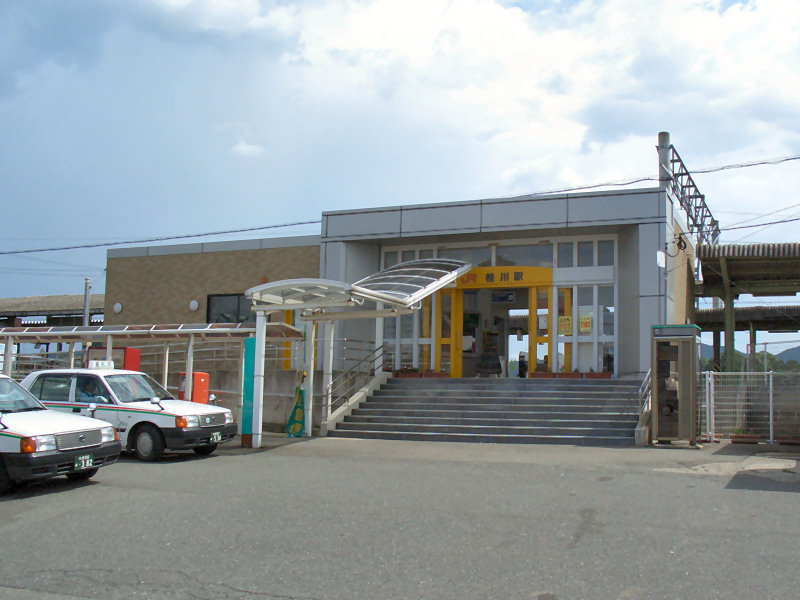
- Station building

General information
- Location: 131-6 Mameda, Katsuragawa-cho, Kaho-gun, Fukuoka-ken 820-0608; Japan
- Coordinates: 33°35′5.33″N 130°39′44.28″E
- Operator: JR Kyushu
- Lines: JC Fukuhoku Yutaka Line (Chikuhō Main Line, Sasaguri Line); JG Haruda Line (Chikuhō Main Line)
- Distance: 45.3 km from Wakamatsu
- Platforms: 1 side + 1 island platform
- Tracks: 3

Other information
- Status: Staffed
- Website: Official website

History
- Opened: 9 December 1901; 124 years ago
- Former names: Nagaō (to 1940)

Passengers
- 2021: 1401 daily (boarding only)

Services
Preceding station	JR Kyushu	Following station
Chikuzen-Daibu JC 10 towards Hakata	Sasaguri Line Local	through to Chikuhō Main Line
through to Haruda Line (Chikuhō Main Line)	Chikuhō Main Line Local	Tentō JC 12 towards Wakamatsu
Kami-Honami JG 02 towards Haruda	Chikuhō Main Line (Haruda Line) Local	Terminus
Location
- Location within Fukuoka Prefecture Location within Japan

Keisen Station (桂川駅, Keisen-eki) is a passenger railway station located in the town of Keisen, Kaho District, Fukuoka, Japan. It is operated by JR Kyushu.

== Lines ==
Keisen Station is served by the Chikuhō Main Line and is located 45.3 km from the starting point of the line at Wakamatsu. It is also the terminus for the 25.1 kilometer Sasaguri Line to Yoshizuka.

== Layout ==
The station consists of one side platform and one island platform serving three tracks with an elevated station building located above the side platform and footbridges connecting to the island platform. There is a side track for parking vehicles on the south side of the station. The station is staffed.

=== Platforms ===
1	■ JC Sasaguri Line	for Shin-Iizuka and Nōgata
2	■ JG Chikuhō Main Line	for Kami-Honami and Haruda
3	■ JC Sasaguri Line	for Sasaguri and Hakata

== History ==
The privately run Chikuhō Kōgyō Railway had opened a track from Wakamatsu to Nōgata on 30 August 1891 and, after several phases of extension, the track had reached south to Iizuka by 1893. On 1 October 1897, the Chikuhō Kōgyō Railway, now renamed the Chikuhō Railway, merged with the Kyushu Railway. Kyushu Railway undertook the next phase of expansion by extending the track to Keisen, then named Nagaō Station (長尾駅), and establishing it as the new southern terminus on 12 December 1901. After the Kyushu Railway was nationalized on 1 July 1907, Japanese Government Railways (JGR) took over control of the station. On 12 October 1909, the track to Iizuka was designated the Chikuho Main Line while the track from Iizuka to Nagao was designated the Nagao Line. On 15 July 1928, Nagao became a through-station when the track was further extended to Chikuzen-Uchino. On 7 December 1929, both lines were merged and the station became part of the Chikuho Main Line. On 1 December 1940, the station was renamed Keizen. With the privatization of Japanese National Railways (JNR), the successor of JGR, on 1 April 1987, control of the station passed to JR Kyushu.

Station numbering was introduced on 28 September 2018 with Keisen being assigned station number JC11 for the Fukuhoku Yutaka Line and JG01 for the Haruda Line.

== Passenger statistics ==
In fiscal 2021, there was a daily average of 1,401 boarding passengers at this station, making it the 109th busiest station on the JR Kyushu network.。

== See also ==
- List of railway stations in Japan

The following stations have the same name in Kanji but have different readings and hence are written differently in Hiragana and when transliterated:

- Katsuragawa Station (Hokkaidō) (桂川駅)
- Katsuragawa Station (Kyoto) (桂川駅)
