= Hakata Station =

Major railway and metro station in Fukuoka, Japan

Coordinates: 33°35′23″N 130°25′14″E

00 00 K11 N18 Hakata Station 博多駅
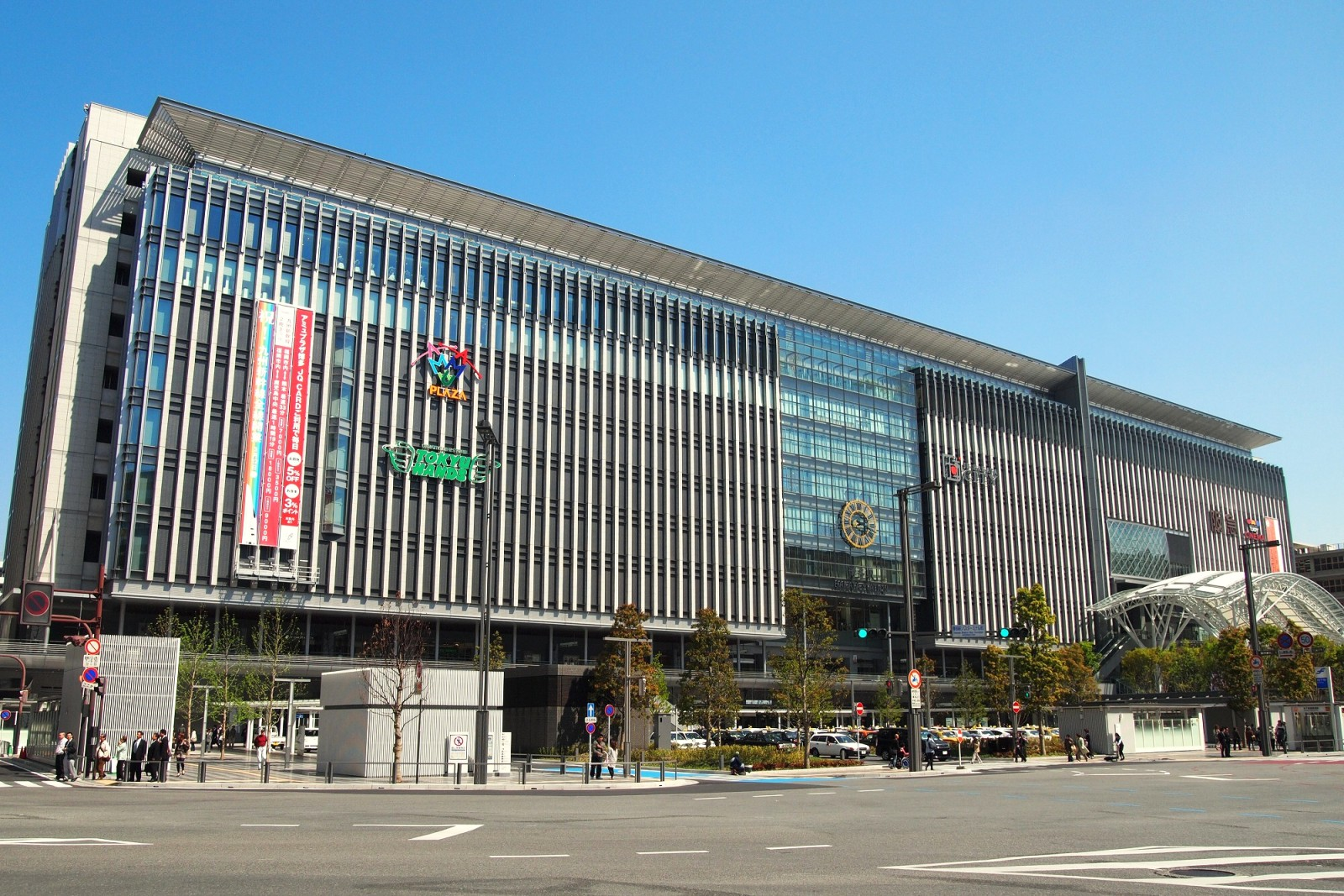
- The JR Hakata City building

General information
- Location: 1-1 Hakata Station Central Street; Hakata, Fukuoka; Japan
- Operator: JR Kyushu; JR West; Fukuoka City Subway

Other information
- Station code: JA00; JB00; JC00; JK00; K11; N18

History
- Opened: 11 December 1889; 136 years ago

Passengers
- FY 2024: 125,462 daily
- Rank: 1st (among JR Kyushu stations)
Services
Preceding station	JR West	Following station
Terminus	San'yō Shinkansen Nozomi	Kokura towards Shin-Ōsaka
Terminus	San'yō Shinkansen Hikari	Kokura towards Shin-Ōsaka
Terminus	San'yō Shinkansen Kodama	Kokura towards Shin-Ōsaka
through to Kyushu Shinkansen	San'yō Shinkansen Mizuho	Kokura towards Shin-Ōsaka
through to Kyushu Shinkansen	San'yō Shinkansen Sakura	Kokura towards Shin-Ōsaka
Hakataminami Terminus	Hakataminami Line	through to San'yō Shinkansen
Preceding station	JR Kyushu	Following station
Kurume towards Kagoshima-Chūō	Kyūshū Shinkansen Mizuho	through to San'yō Shinkansen
Shin-Tosu towards Kagoshima-Chūō	Kyūshū Shinkansen Sakura	through to San'yō Shinkansen
Shin-Tosu towards Kagoshima-Chūō	Kyūshū Shinkansen Tsubame	Terminus
Minami-Fukuoka JB 03 towards Kagoshima	Kagoshima Main Line Rapid	Yoshizuka JA 01 towards Mojikō
Minami-Fukuoka JB 03 towards Kagoshima	Kagoshima Main Line Semi-Rapid	Yoshizuka JA 01 towards Mojikō
Takeshita JB 01 towards Kagoshima	Kagoshima Main Line Local	Yoshizuka JA 01 towards Mojikō
Tosu towards Takeo-Onsen	Relay Kamome	Terminus
Futsukaichi towards Sasebo or Huis Ten Bosch	Midori and Huis Ten Bosch	Terminus
Terminus	Sasaguri Line	Yoshizuka JC 01 towards Keisen
Preceding station	Fukuoka City Subway	Following station
Gion K10 towards Meinohama	Airport Line	Higashi-Hie K12 towards Fukuoka Airport
Kushida Shrine N17 towards Hashimoto	Nanakuma Line	Terminus
Location
- Location within Fukuoka city Location within Fukuoka Prefecture Location within Kyushu Location within Japan

Hakata Station (Japanese: 博多駅, Hepburn: Hakata-eki) is a major railway station in Hakata-ku, Fukuoka, Japan. It is the largest and busiest railway terminal in Kyushu, and is a gateway to other cities in Kyushu for travelers coming from Honshu by rail travel. The San'yō Shinkansen from Osaka ends at this station.

The station was rebuilt in 2011. The main building was demolished and a new, larger station building, as well as office buildings and new platforms, was constructed. The station reconstruction project was initiated specifically for the Kyushu Shinkansen extension from Hakata to Shin-Yatsushiro Station which continues southward through its existing route to Kagoshima-Chūō Station. The new station building has a Hankyu Department Store, its first branch store in Kyushu, as a tenant, as well as other first-in-Kyushu branch retailers including Tokyu Hands.

== Lines ==
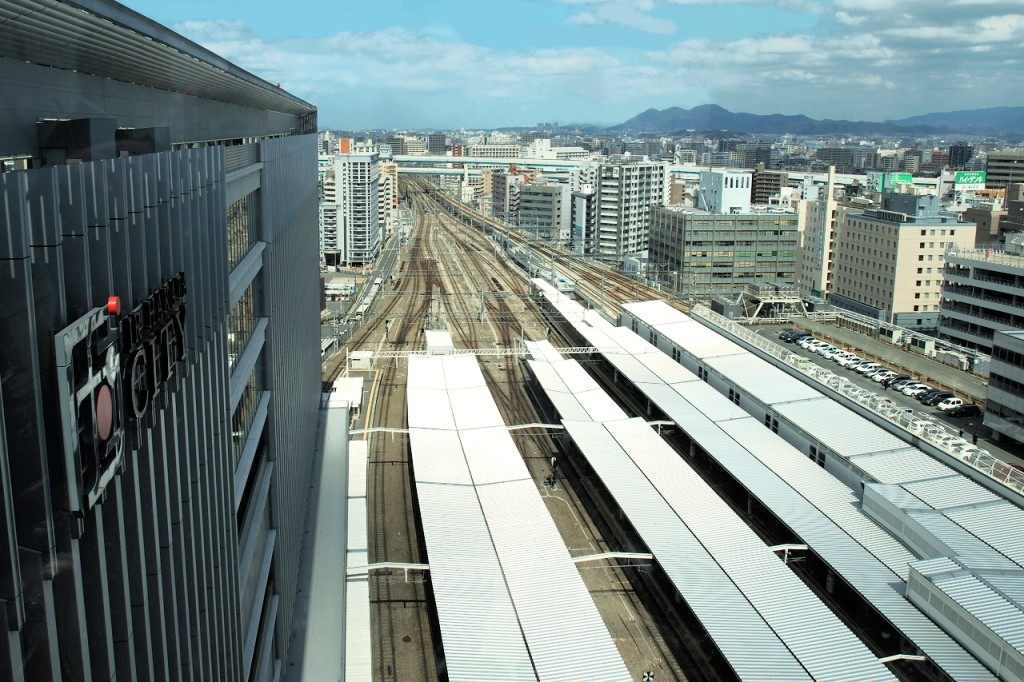
Hakata Station overview, March 2011

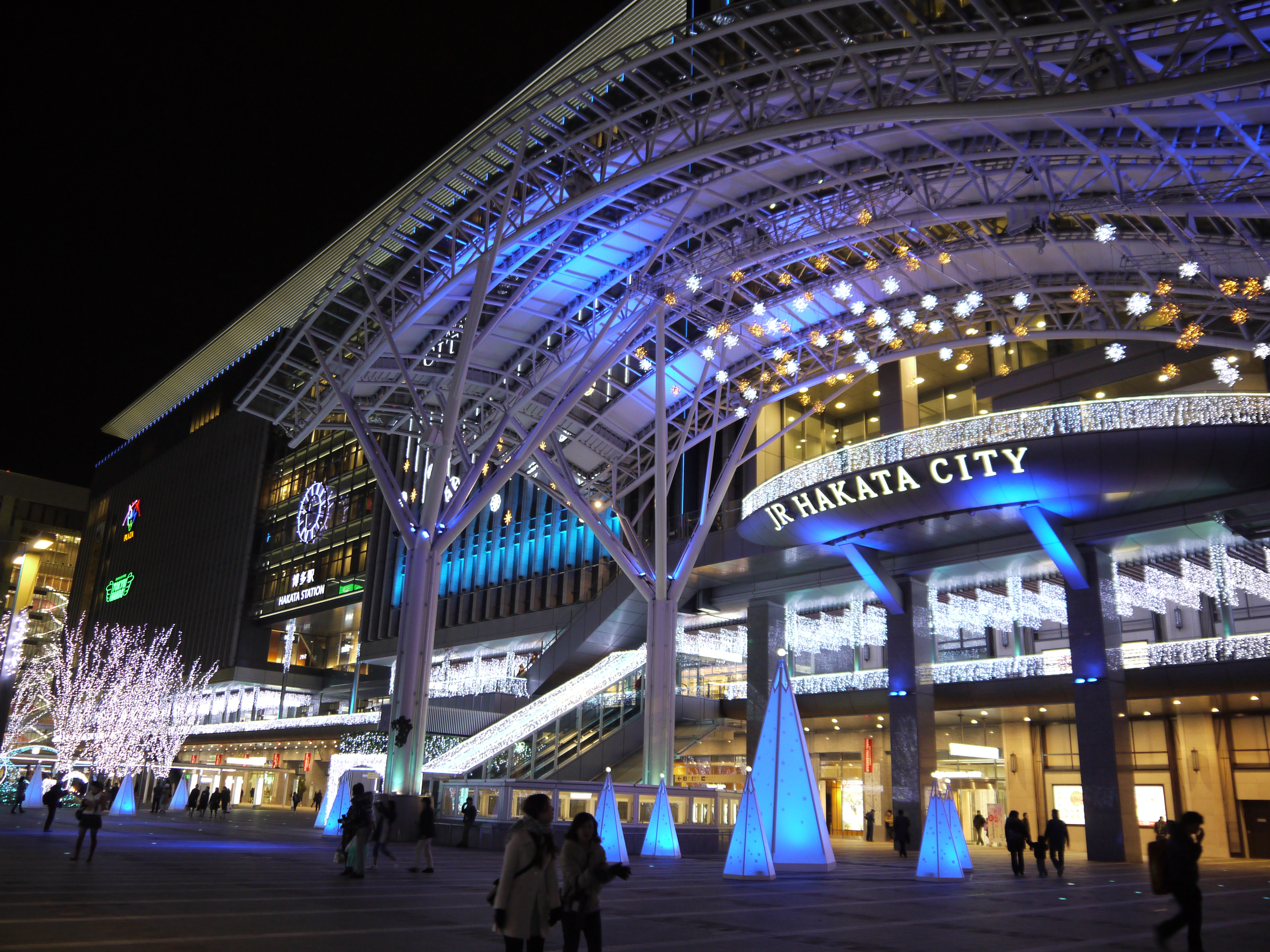
Hakata Station and JR Hakata City

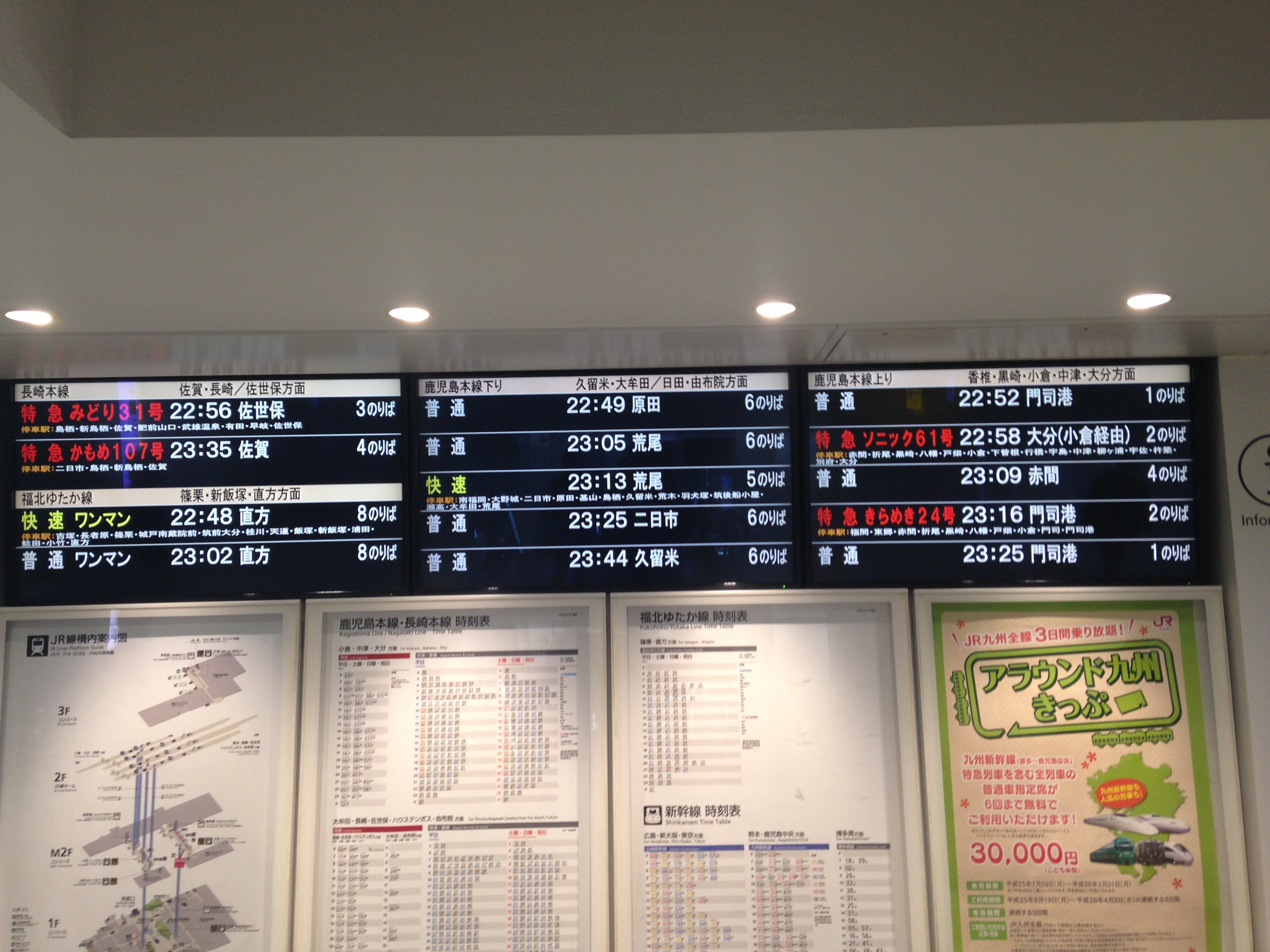
LCD departure board of Hakata Station

- JR Kyushu
  - Fukuhoku-Yutaka Line
  - Kagoshima Main Line
  - Kyushu Shinkansen
- JR West
  - San'yō Shinkansen
  - Hakataminami Line
- Fukuoka City Subway
  - Airport Line
  - Nanakuma Line

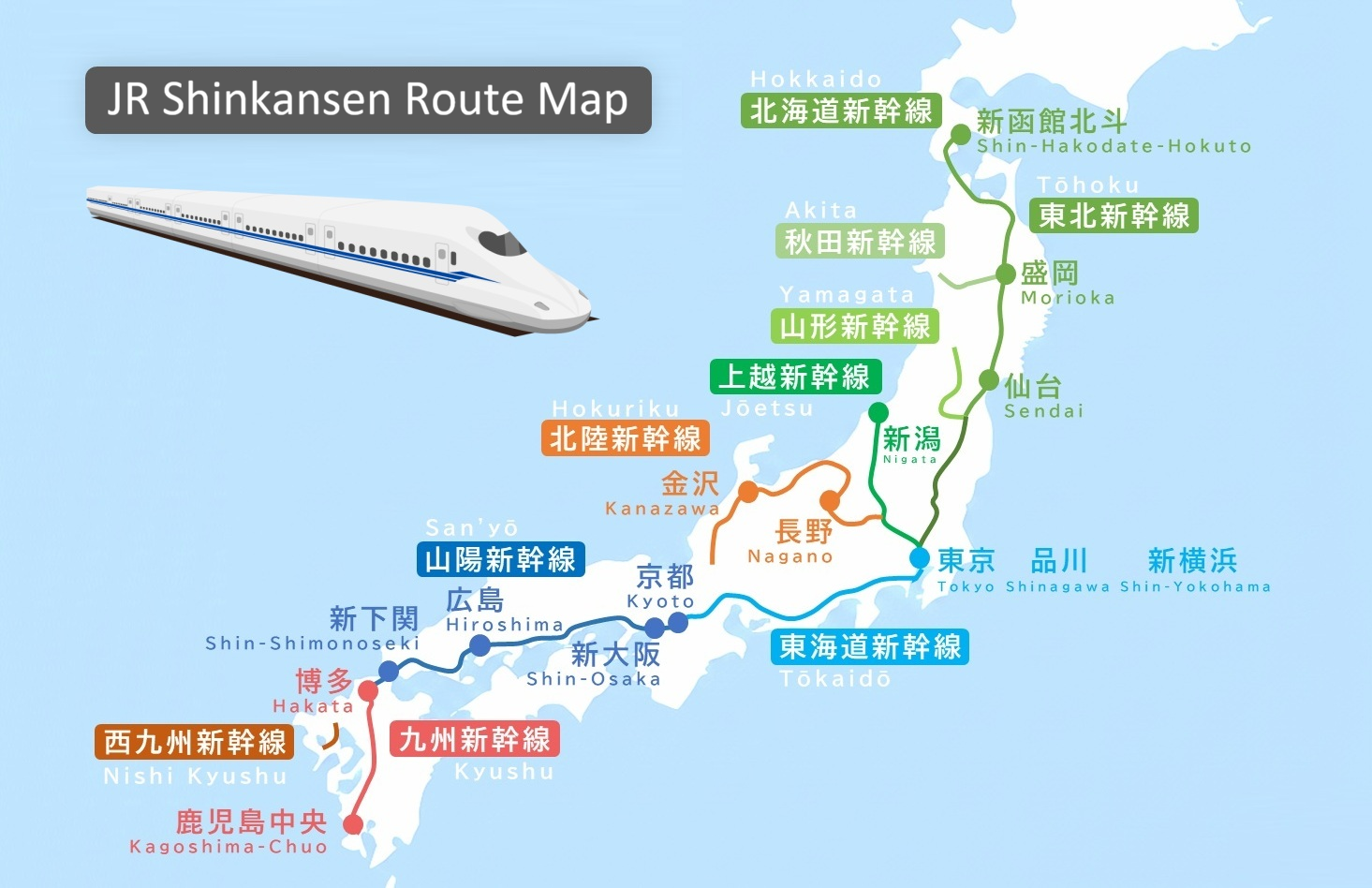
Shinkansen Route Map(Japan)

== Platforms ==
=== JR ===
1	■ Limited Express Kirameki	for Kokura and Mojikō
1	Kagoshima Main Line	for Kashii, Orio, Kokura, and Mojikō
2	■ Limited Express Sonic, Nichirin	for Kokura, Yanagigaura, Ōita, Saiki, and Miyazaki
2	■ Limited Express Kirameki	for Kokura and Mojikō
2	Kagoshima Main Line	for Kashii, Orio, Kokura, and Mojikō
3	■ Limited Express Relay Kamome, Midori, Huis Ten Bosch	for Saga, Nagasaki, Sasebo, Huis Ten Bosch
3	■ Limited Express Kirameki	for Kokura, and Mojikō
3	Kagoshima Main Line	for Kashii, Orio, Kokura, and Mojikō
4	■ Limited Express Relay Kamome, Midori	for Saga, Nagasaki, and Sasebo
4	Kagoshima Main Line	for Kashii, Orio, Kokura, and Mojikō
5	■ Limited Express Yufuin-no-mori	for Hita, Yufuin, and Ōita
5	Kagoshima Main Line	for Futsukaichi, Tosu, Kurume, and Ōmuta
5	Kagoshima Main Line	for Kashii, Orio, Kokura, and Mojikō
6	Kagoshima Main Line	for Futsukaichi, Tosu, Kurume, and Ōmuta
7	Kagoshima Main Line	for Futsukaichi, Tosu, Kurume, and Ōmuta
7	Fukuhoku-yutaka Line	for Shin-Iizuka, Nōgata, and Orio
7	■ Limited Express Kaiō	for Shin-Iizuka and Nōgata
8	Fukuhoku-yutaka Line	for Shin-Iizuka, Nōgata, and Orio
11	Kyushu Shinkansen	for Kumamoto and Kagoshima-Chūō
12-14	San'yō Shinkansen	for Hiroshima, Okayama, Shin-Ōsaka, and Tokyo
15-16	Kyushu Shinkansen	for Kumamoto and Kagoshima-Chūō
15-16	Hakataminami Line	for Hakataminami

=== Fukuoka City Subway ===
The subway station's symbol mark is a bolt of cloth with the traditional hakata-ori pattern "Kenjō Hakata"(献上博多). Hakata-ori is a traditional woven silk textile of Hakata.

1	Kūkō Line	for Fukuoka Airport
2	Kūkō Line	for Tenjin, Meinohama, Chikuzen-Maebaru and Karatsu

3	Nanakuma Line	for Hashimoto
4	Nanakuma Line	for Hashimoto

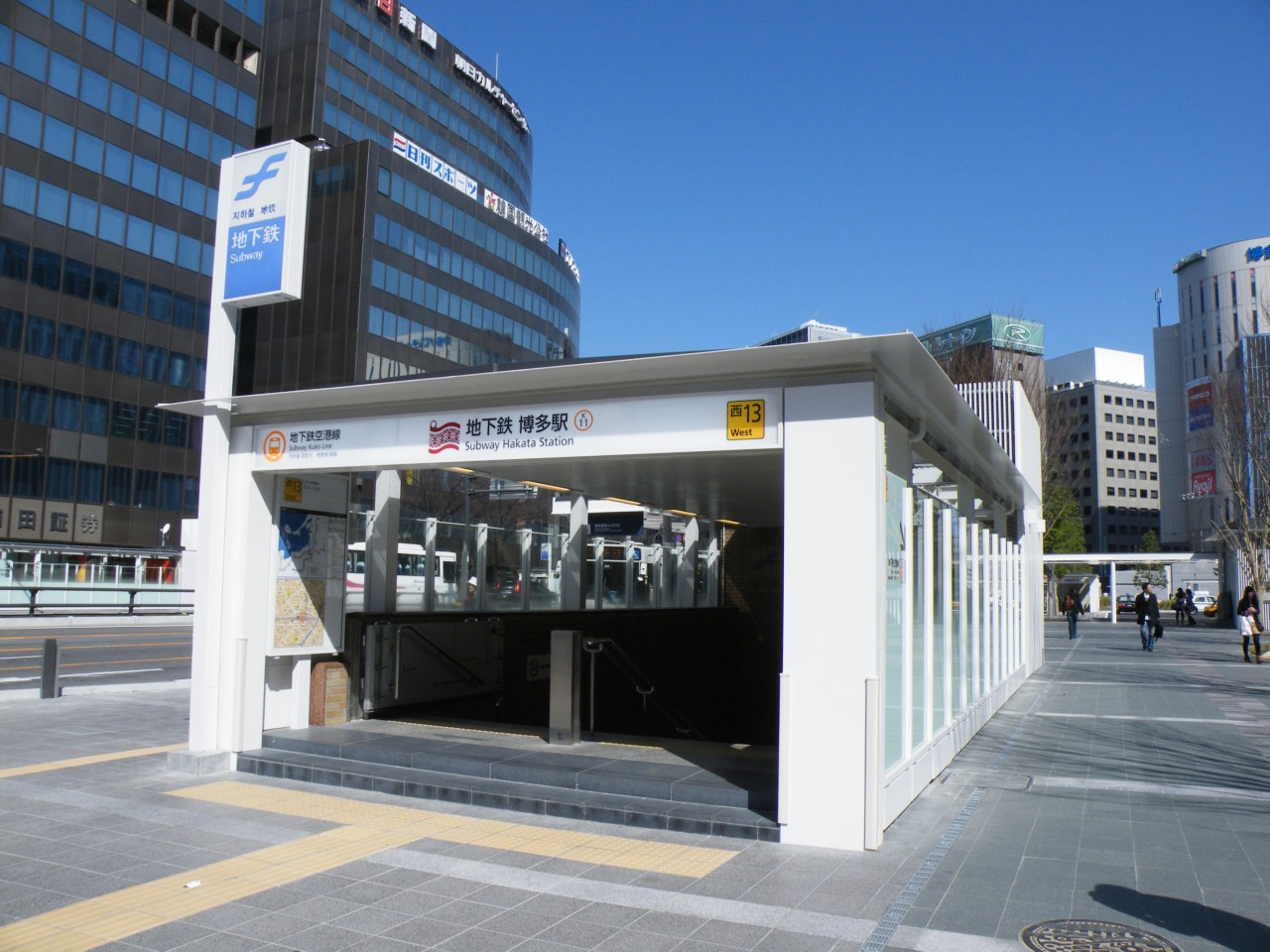
Entrance No.13

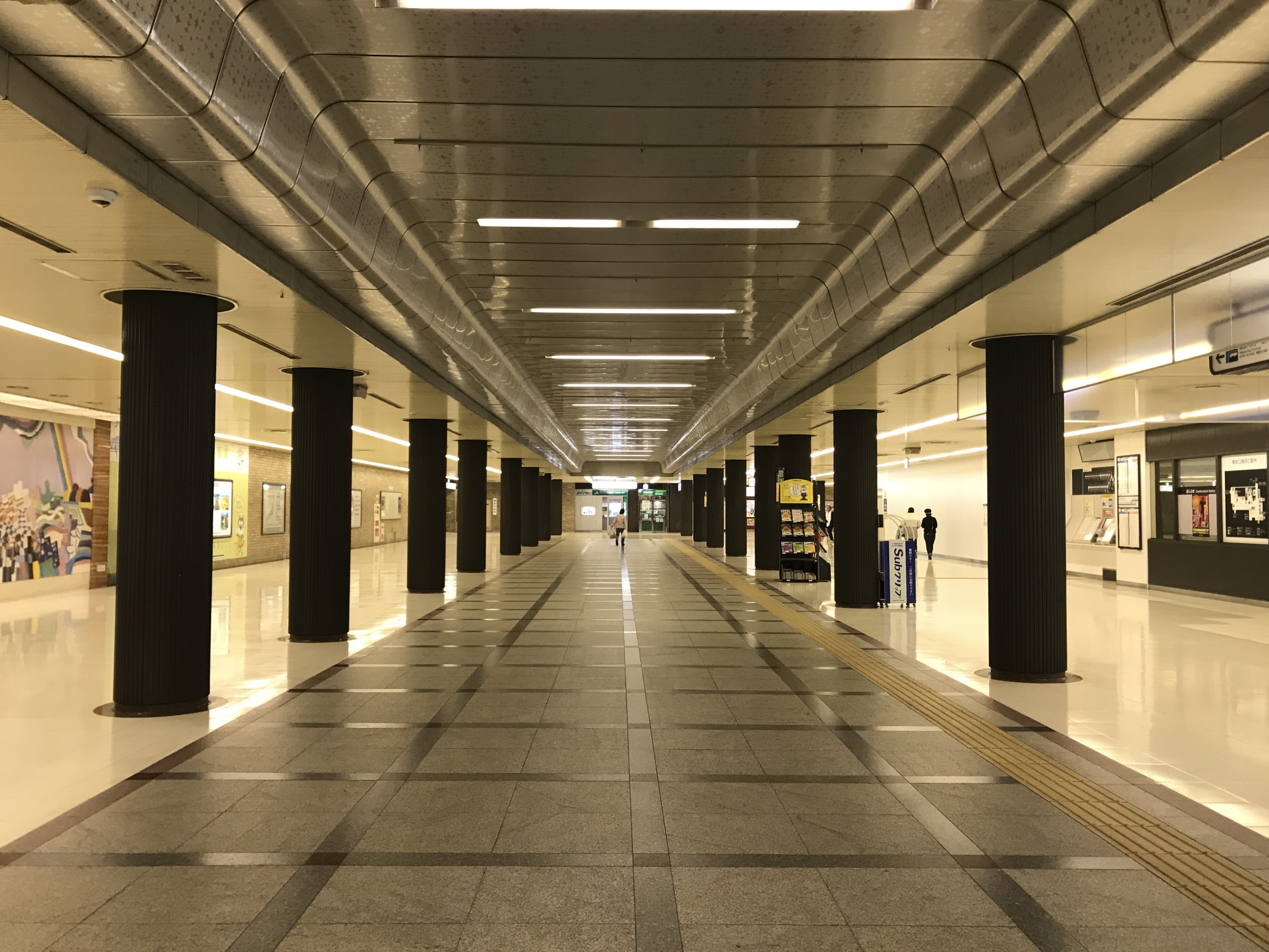
Concourse

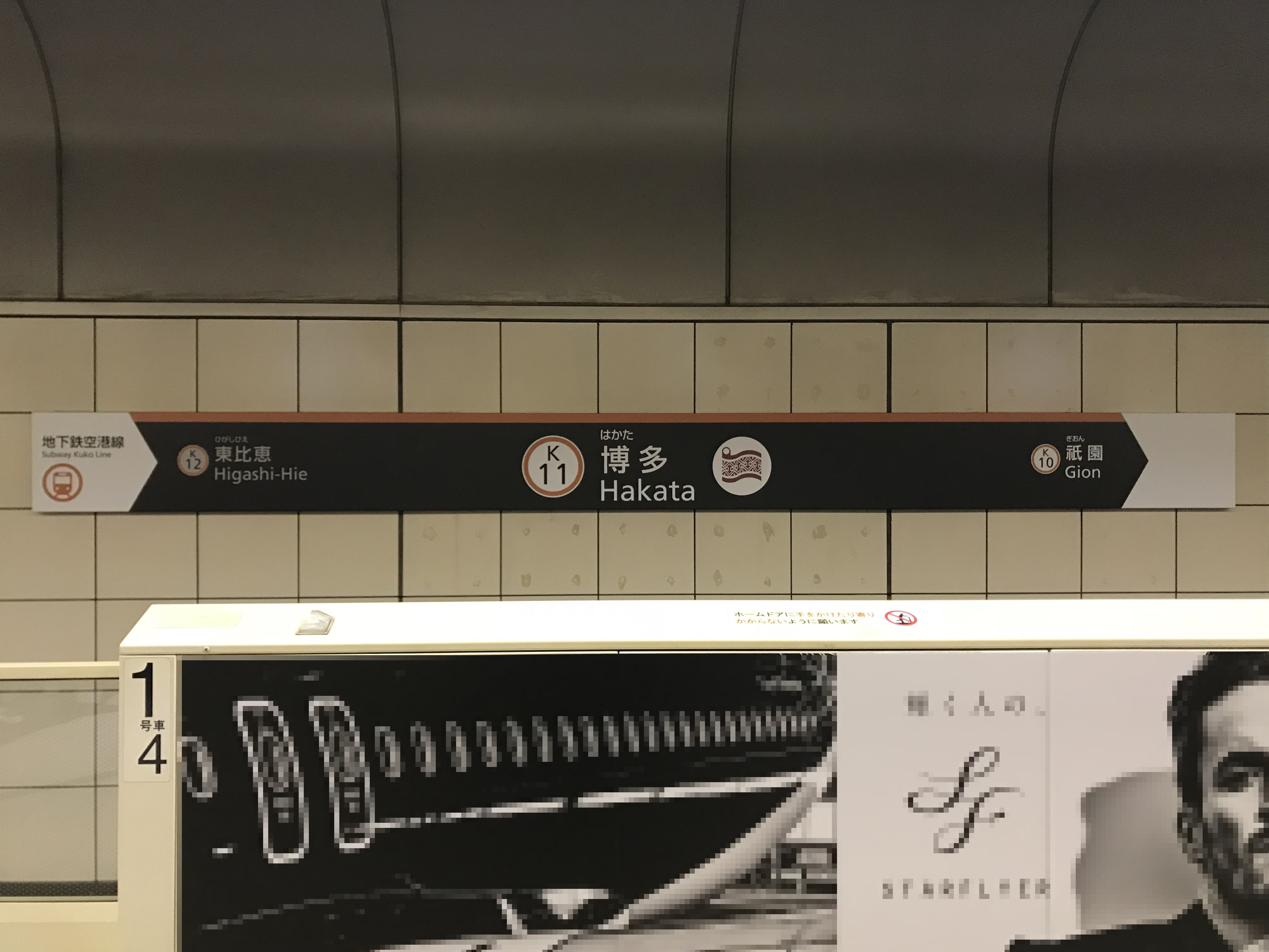
Station sign of the Hakata subway station for Gion bound trains

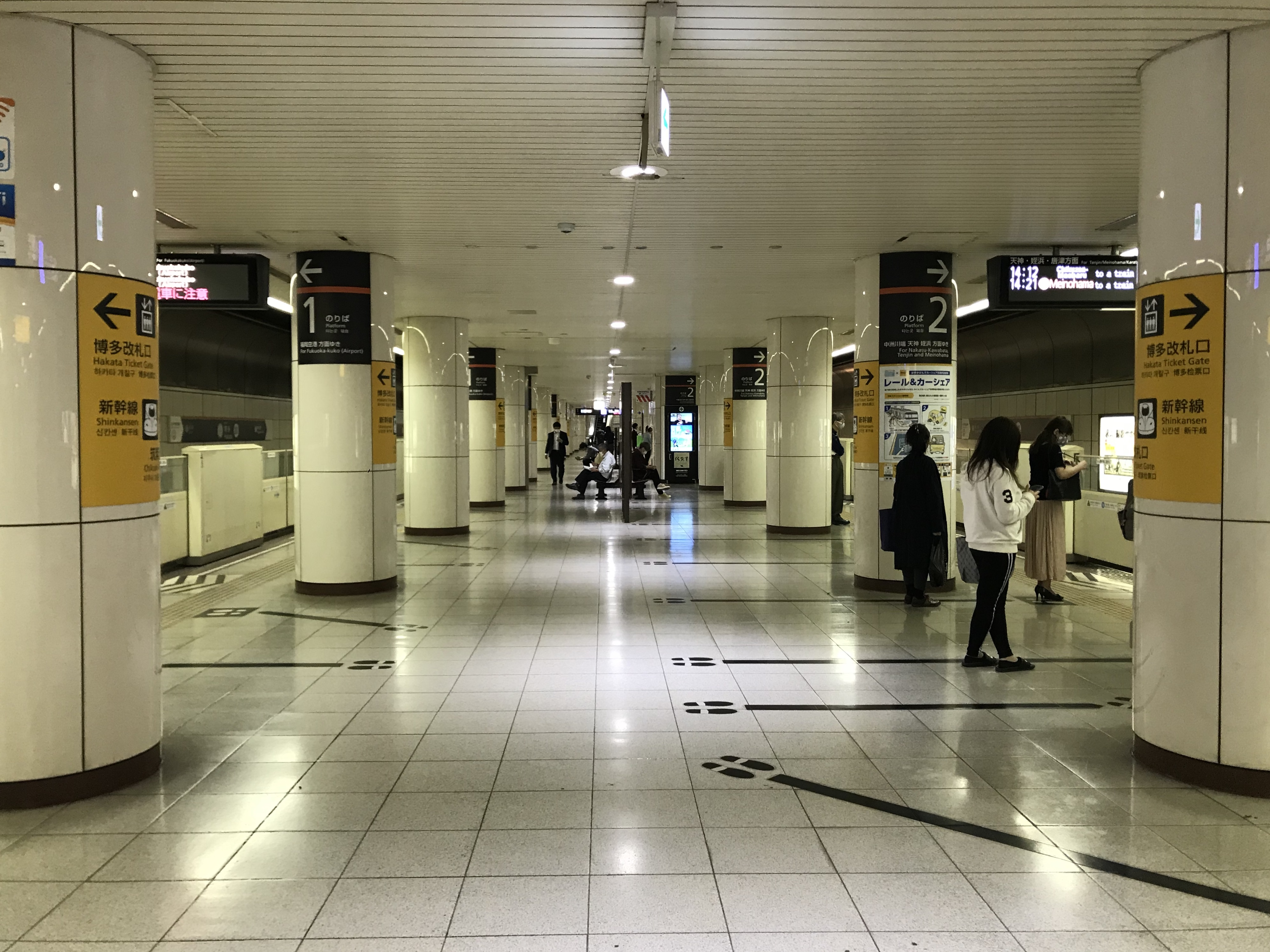
Platform

== History ==
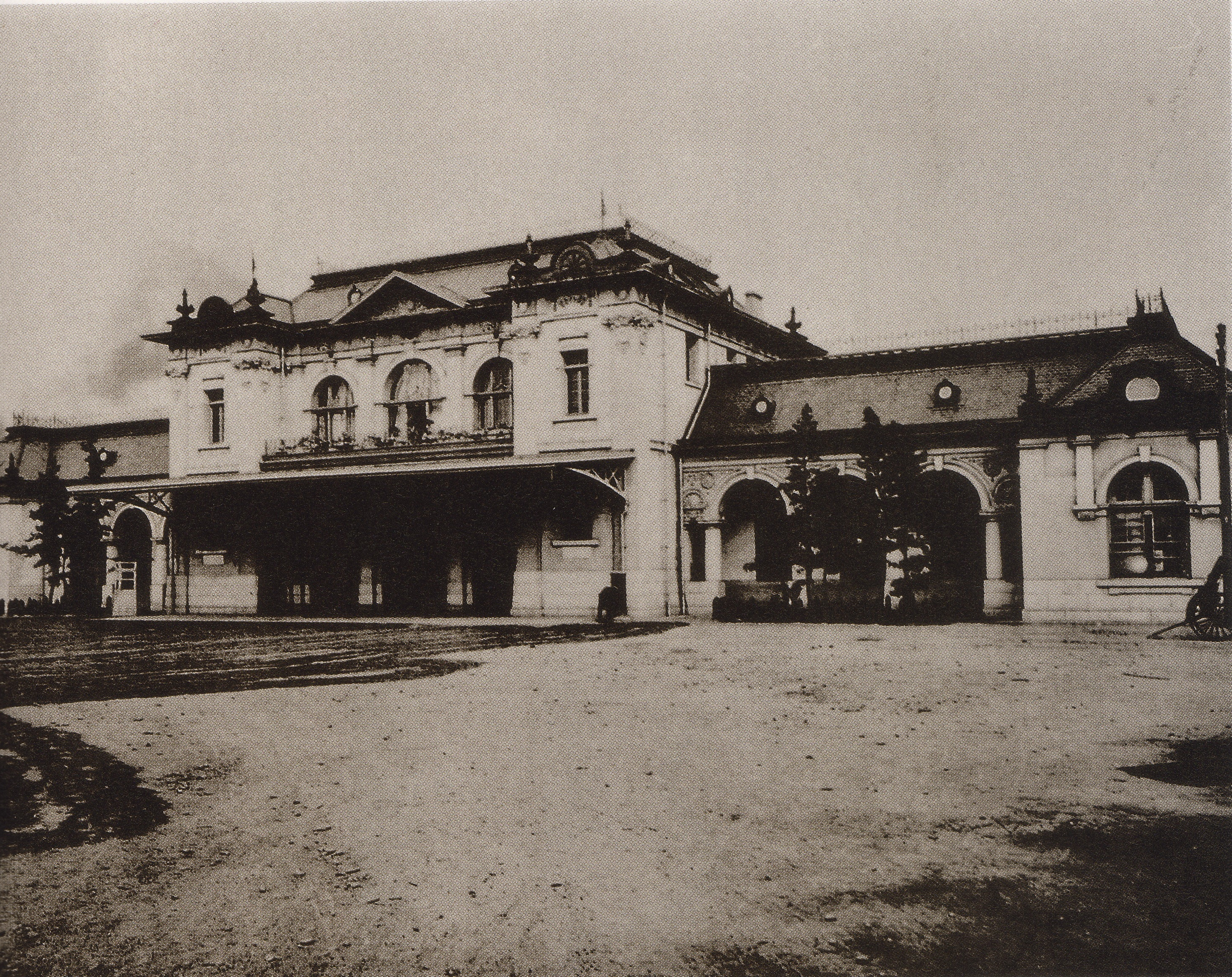
Hakata Station building, circa 1909

- 11 December 1889: opened. The original station building was about 600 m north of the current position.
- 1 December 1963: station reconstructed in present form raised above street level.
- 10 March 1975: San'yō Shinkansen services began.
- 22 March 1983: temporary Fukuoka City Subway station opened.
- 3 March 1985: current Fukuoka City Subway station opened.
- 3 March 2011: JR Hakata City opened.
- 12 March 2011: Kyushu Shinkansen services begin.
- 27 March 2023: Extension of the Fukuoka City Subway Nanakuma Line begins operation.

== Passenger statistics ==
In fiscal 2024, the station was used by an average of 125,462 passengers daily (boarding passengers only), and it ranked 1st among the busiest stations of JR Kyushu.

== See also ==
- List of railway stations in Japan
