= Kotake Station =

Railway station in Kotake, Fukuoka Prefecture, Japan

JC 17 Kotake Station 小竹駅
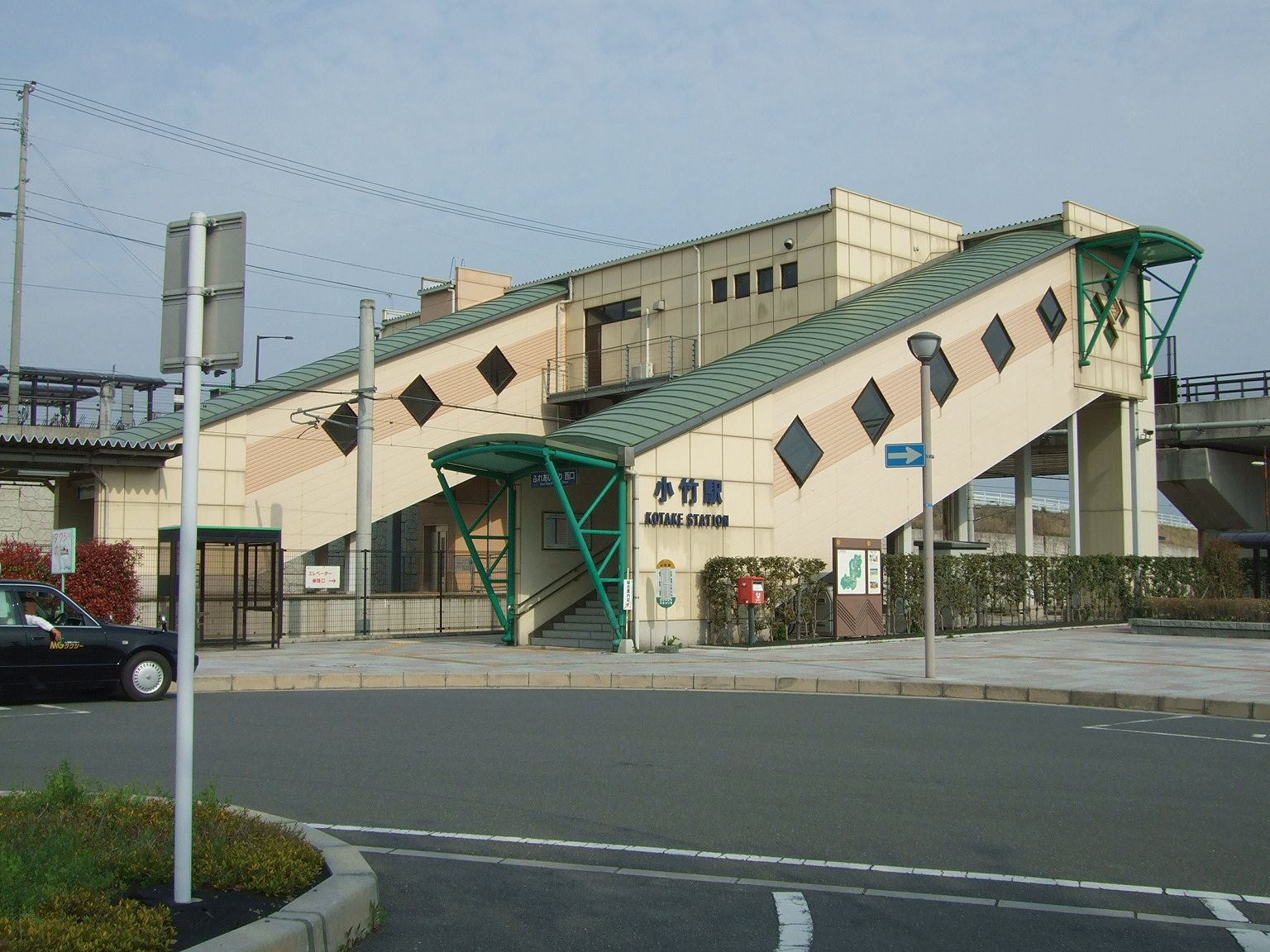
- Kotake Station in 2008

General information
- Location: 2128 Katsuno, Otake-cho, Kurate-gun, Fukuoka-ken 820-1103; Japan
- Coordinates: 33°41′47.11″N 130°42′38.14″E
- Operator: JR Kyushu
- Line: JC Chikuhō Main Line
- Distance: 31.3 km from Wakamatsu
- Platforms: 1 island platform
- Tracks: 2

Construction
- Structure type: At grade
- Accessible: Yes

Other information
- Status: Unstaffed
- Website: Official website

History
- Opened: 28 October 1892

Passengers
- FY2020: 538
- Rank: 208th (among JR Kyushu stations)

Services
Preceding station	JR Kyushu	Following station
Namazuta towards Haruda	Chikuhō Main Line Local	Katsuno towards Wakamatsu
Location
- Location within Fukuoka Prefecture Location within Japan

Kotake Station (小竹駅, Kotake-eki) is a passenger railway station located in the town of Kotake, Fukuoka Prefecture, Japan. It is operated by JR Kyushu.

== Lines ==
The station is served by the Chikuhō Main Line and is located 31.3 km from the starting point of the line at Wakamatsu. Only local trains stop at this station.

== Station layout ==
The station, which is unstaffed, consists of an island platform serving two tracks. During the heyday of coal transportation, there were many side tracks, but the premises were significantly reorganized, and when the Chikuho Main Line was electrified bridge-type station building. There is a free passage inside the station building, and a Kotake Community Hall is attached. The station is also designed with the kanji "bamboo" in the station name in mind. The remains of the junction with the Shinta branch line are now used as side tracks for parking vehicles.

=== Platforms ===
1	■ JC Chikuhō Main Line	for Shin-Iizuka and Hakata
2	■ JC Chikuhō Main Line	for Nōgata and Orio

== History ==
The privately run Chikuho Kogyo Railway had opened a track from Wakamatsu to Nōgata on 30 August 1891. In the next phase of expansion, the track was extended southwards with Kotake being opened as the new southern terminus on 28 October 1892. Kotake became a through-station on 3 July 1893 when the track was further extended to Iizuka. On 1 October 1897, the Chikuho Kogyo Railway, now renamed the Chikuho Railway, merged with the Kyushu Railway. After the Kyushu Railway was nationalized on 1 July 1907, Japanese Government Railways (JGR) took over control of the station. On 12 October 1909, the station became part of the Chikuho Main Line With the privatization of Japanese National Railways (JNR), the successor of JGR, on 1 April 1987, control of the station passed to JR Kyushu.

== Passenger statistics ==
In fiscal 2020, the station was used by a daily average of 538 boarding passengers, making it the 208th busiest station on the JR Kyushu network.。

== Surrounding area ==
- Japan National Route 200
- Kotake Town Hall

== See also ==
- List of railway stations in Japan
