= Katsuno Station =

Railway station in Kotake, Fukuoka Prefecture, Japan

JC 18 Katsuno Station 勝野駅
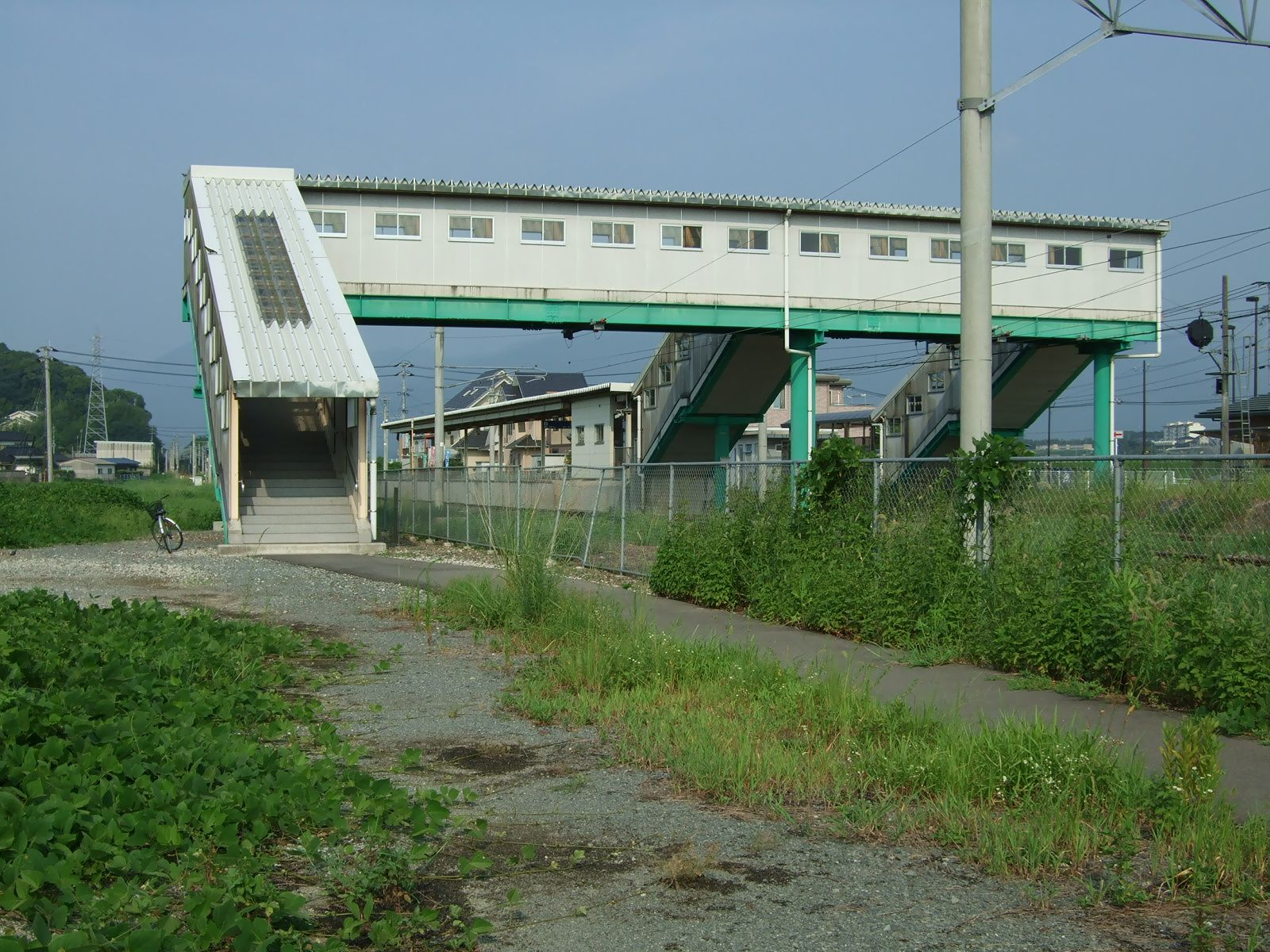
- Katsuno Station in 2009

General information
- Location: Akaji, Kotake, Kurate-gun, Fukuoka-ken 820-1102; Japan
- Coordinates: 33°43′42″N 130°42′59″E
- Operator: JR Kyushu
- Line: JC Chikuhō Main Line
- Distance: 27.5 km from Wakamatsu
- Platforms: 1 island platform
- Tracks: 2

Construction
- Structure type: At grade
- Accessible: No - island platform accessed by footbridge

Other information
- Status: Unstaffed
- Website: Official website

History
- Opened: 13 February 1901

Services
Preceding station	JR Kyushu	Following station
Nōgata towards Haruda	Chikuhō Main Line Local	Kotake towards Wakamatsu
Location
- Location within Fukuoka Prefecture Location within Japan

Katsuno Station (勝野駅, Katsuno-eki) is a passenger railway station located in the town of Kotake, Fukuoka Prefecture, Japan. It is operated by JR Kyushu.

== Lines ==
The station is served by the Chikuhō Main Line and is located 27.5 km from the starting point of the line at Wakamatsu. Only local trains stop at this station.

== Station layout ==
The station, which is unstaffed, consists of an island platform serving two tracks. There is no station building but a shelter is provided on the platform for waiting passengers. A footbridge from the main road gives access to the island platform and also to the other side of the tracks.

=== Platforms ===
1	■ JC Chikuhō Main Line	for Shin-Iizuka and Hakata
2	■ JC Chikuhō Main Line	for Nōgata and Orio

== History ==
The privately run Chikuho Kogyo Railway had opened a track from Wakamatsu to Nōgata on 30 August 1891 and after several phases of expansion, the track had reached Iizuka. On 1 October 1897, the Chikuho Kogyo Railway, now renamed the Chikuho Railway, merged with the Kyushu Railway which acquired the track. On 13 February 1901, Katsuno was opened as an additional station on the track for the transport of freight only. After the Kyushu Railway was nationalized on 1 July 1907, Japanese Government Railways (JGR) took over control of the station. On 12 October 1909, the station became part of the Chikuho Main Line. On 21 July 1912, JGR upgraded the station to include passenger services. With the privatization of Japanese National Railways (JNR), the successor of JGR, on 1 April 1987, control of the station passed to JR Kyushu.

== Surrounding area ==
The station is located at the northern end of Kotake, despite the fact that former Katsuno village was at the southern end of Kotake, next to Kotake Station. The area in front of the station is deserted, with only fields and small hamlets.

== See also ==
- List of railway stations in Japan
