= Oku-Dōkai Station =

Railway station in Kitakyushu, Japan

Coordinates: 33°53′21″N 130°45′54″E

JE 04 Oku-Dōkai Station 奥洞海駅
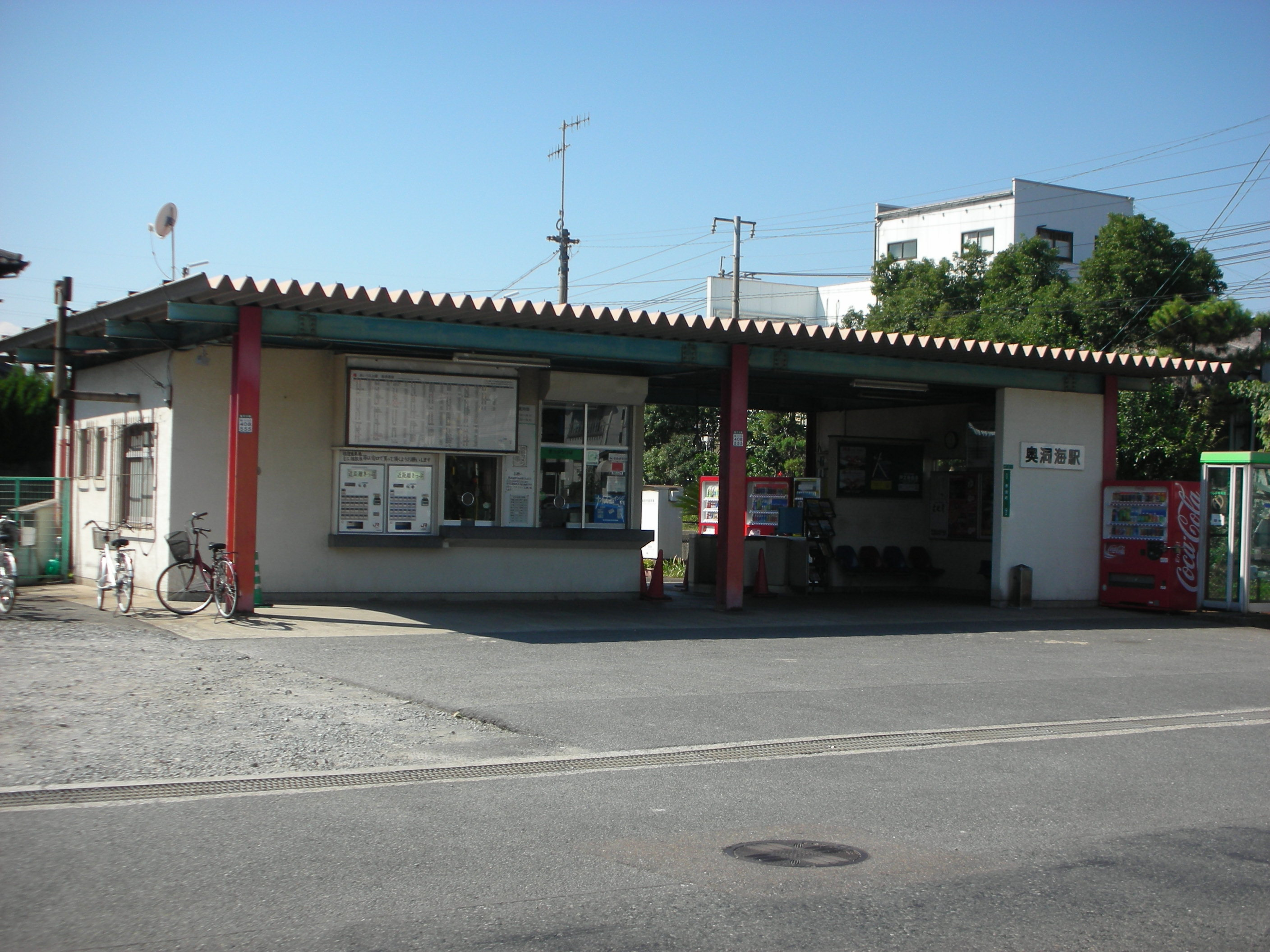

General information
- Location: 9-1 Akaiwa-machi, Wakamatsu Ward, Kitakyushu City, Fukuoka Prefecture; Japan
- Operator: JR Kyushu
- Line: JE Wakamatsu Line (Chikuhō Main Line)
- Platforms: 2 side platforms
- Tracks: 2

Construction
- Structure type: At grade

Other information
- Station code: JE04

Passengers
- 2021: 309 daily (boarding only)

Services
Preceding station	JR Kyushu	Following station
Futajima JE 03 towards Orio	Chikuhō Main Line (Wakamatsu Line) Local	Fujinoki JE 05 towards Wakamatsu
Location

Oku-Dōkai Station (奥洞海駅, Okudōkai-eki) is a railway station on the Kyūshū Railway Company (JR Kyūshū) Chikuhō Main Line (also known as the Wakamatsu Line) in Wakamatsu-ku, Kitakyushu, Fukuoka Prefecture, Japan.

== Station layout ==
1	■ Wakamatsu Line (Chikuhō Main Line)	for Wakamatsu
2	■ Wakamatsu Line (Chikuhō Main Line)	for Orio, Nakama, and Nōgata

== History ==
Japanese National Railways (JNR) opened the station on 6 November 1953 as an additional temporary stop on the existing Chikuho Main Line track. On 1 November 1962, it was upgraded to a full station. With the privatization of JNR on 1 April 1987, control of the station passed to JR Kyushu.

On 4 March 2017, Oku-Dōkai, along with several other stations on the line, became a "Smart Support Station". Under this scheme, although the station is unstaffed, passengers using the automatic ticket vending machines or ticket gates can receive assistance via intercom from staff at a central support centre which is located at Nakama.

== Surrounding area ==
It is the westernmost train station among four stations in Wakamatsu-ku, all of those are on the Chikuho Main Line. National Route 199 runs immediately north of the station. Other points of interest include:

- Wakamatsu Boat Racing - 200m south
- Best Denki Wakamatsu-nishi store - 400m east
- Higashi Futajima Post office - 500m west
