= Ashikisan Castle =

Castle ruins in Chikushino, Fukuoka, Japan

- 阿志岐山城跡
- Chikushino, Fukuoka, Japan

Site information
- Type: Korean-style fortress
- Condition: Ruins

Site history
- Built: c.660s
- Built by: Yamato court
- In use: Asuka period
- Ashikisan Castle (Fukuoka Prefecture) Ashikisan Castle (Japan) National Historic Site of Japan

Ashikisan Castle (阿志岐山城跡, Ashikisan-jō ato) was an ancient castle (also known as a Korean-style fortresses in Japan (朝鮮式山城, Chōsen-shiki yamajiro) located in the Hakiho Ashiki neighborhood of the city of Chikushino, Fukuoka Prefecture Japan. Its ruins have been protected as a National Historic Site since 2011.

== History ==
After the defeat of the combined Baekje and Yamato Japan forces, at the hands of the Silla and Tang China alliance at the Battle of Hakusukinoe in 663, the Yamato court feared an invasion from either or both Tang or Silla. In response, a huge network of shore fortifications was constructed throughout the rest of the 600s, often with the assistance of Baekje engineers, generals and artisans. Unaware of the outbreak of the Silla-Tang War (670–676), the Japanese would continue to build fortifications until 701, even after finding out that Silla was no longer friendly with Tang. The name "kōgoishi" means "stones of divine protection," a name given them by the Meiji period archaeologist Tsuboi Shōgorō, who conjectured that they served as spiritual or practical protection for sacred sites. Scholars after Tsuboi determined that the structures are most likely the remains of practical, military fortifications, and were unlikely to have significant spiritual connections, although much remains unknown about these structures and there is very little contemporary documentary evidence.

The Ashikisan fortification is located approximately 5 kilometers east-southeast of Dazaifu, at the western foot of Miyajidake, 339 meters above sea level, to the east of the Ashiki Plain. Since its discovery in 1999, archaeological excavations have continued, and a 1340 meter long stone row with three water gates and an earthwork have been confirmed. When viewed from the plains, it can be seen that the entire mountain was used as a defensive facility, with rows of stones encircling the mountainside. It is believed to be contemporary with the Kii Castle ruins. The site is approximately 16 minutes by car from Chikuzen-Yamae Station on the JR Kyushu Chikuhō Main Line.

== See also ==
- List of Historic Sites of Japan (Fukuoka)
- List of foreign-style castles in Japan
- Kōgoishi

== Literature ==
- De Lange, William (2021). An Encyclopedia of Japanese Castles. Groningen: Toyo Press. pp. 600 pages. ISBN 978-9492722300.
