= Higashi-Mizumaki Station =

Railway station in Mizumaki, Fukuoka Prefecture, Japan

JC 25 Higashi-Mizumaki Station 東水巻駅
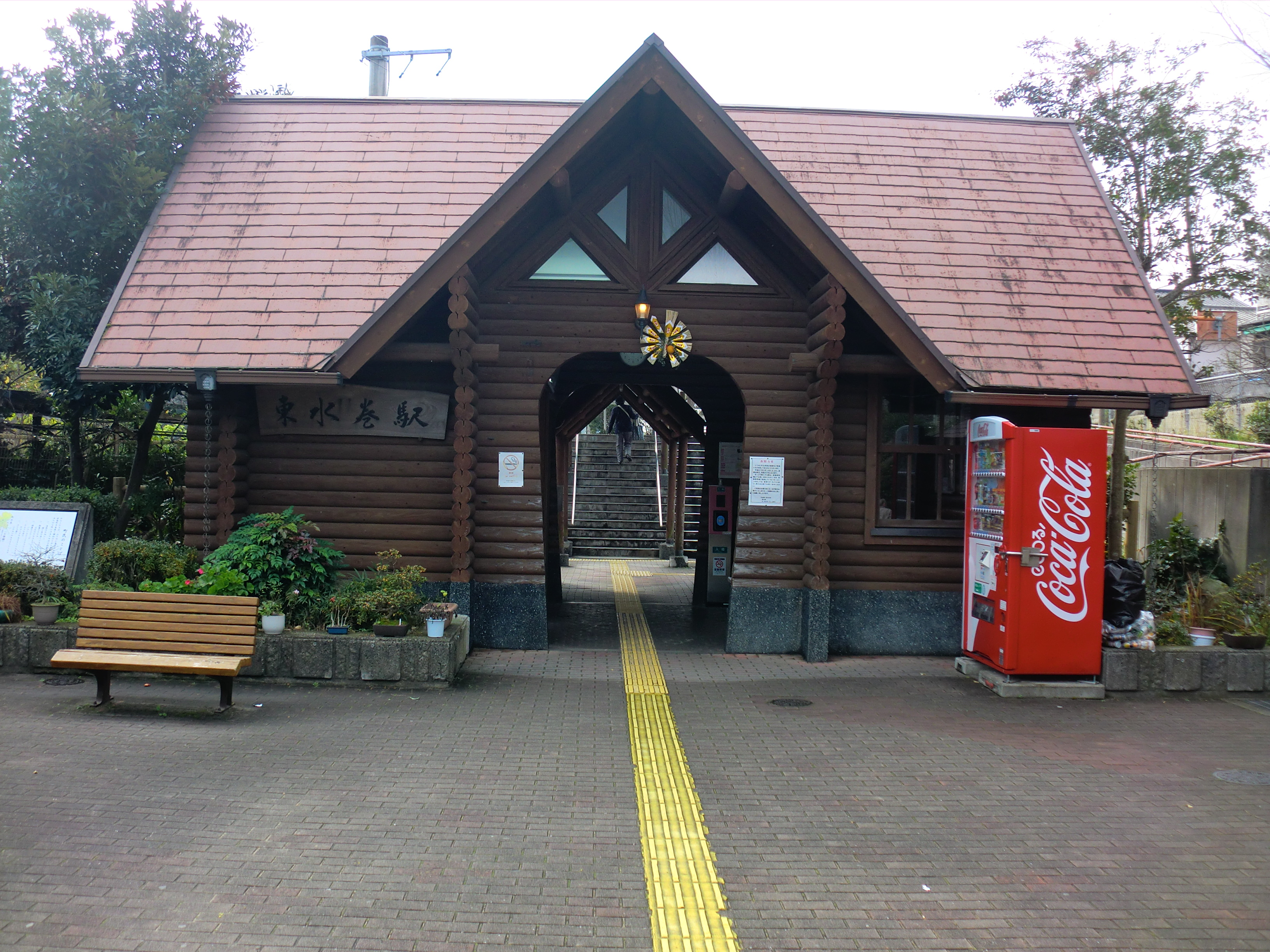
- Higashi-Mizumaki Station in 2016

General information
- Location: 1 Chome-8 Yoshidaminami, Mizumaki-machi, Onga-gun, Fukuoka-ken 807-0048; Japan
- Coordinates: 33°50′27.07″N 130°42′29.74″E
- Operator: JR Kyushu
- Line: JC Chikuhō Main Line
- Distance: 13.5 km from Wakamatsu
- Platforms: 1 island platform
- Tracks: 2

Construction
- Structure type: At grade
- Accessible: Yes - ramps to platform

Other information
- Status: Remotely managed station
- Website: Official website

History
- Opened: 13 March 1988

Passengers
- FY2020: 324 daily
- Rank: 257th (among JR Kyushu stations)

Services
| Preceding station | JR Kyushu | Following station |
|---|---|---|
| Nakama towards Haruda | Chikuhō Main Line Local | Orio towards Wakamatsu |
Location
- Location within Fukuoka Prefecture Location within Japan

Higashi-Mizumaki Station (東水巻駅, Higashi-Mizumaki-eki) is a passenger railway station located in the town of Mizumaki, Fukuoka Prefecture, Japan. It is operated by JR Kyushu.

== Lines ==
The station is served by the Chikuhō Main Line and is located 13.5 km from the starting point of the line at Wakamatsu.

== Station layout ==
The station is located on a piece of land where the two tracks of the Chikuhō Main Line diverge. The station building, a modern timber structure, is in between the tracks and houses a waiting room and automatic ticket vending machines. Steps or ramps lead up to a triangular piece of land with platforms on two sides, the station building occupying the base of the triangle. The two platforms thus be considered a very broad island platform or two widely separate side platforms.

=== Platforms ===
| 1 | ■ JC Chikuhō Main Line | for Kurate, Nōgata |
| 2 | ■ JC Chikuhō Main Line | for Orio, Wakamatsu |

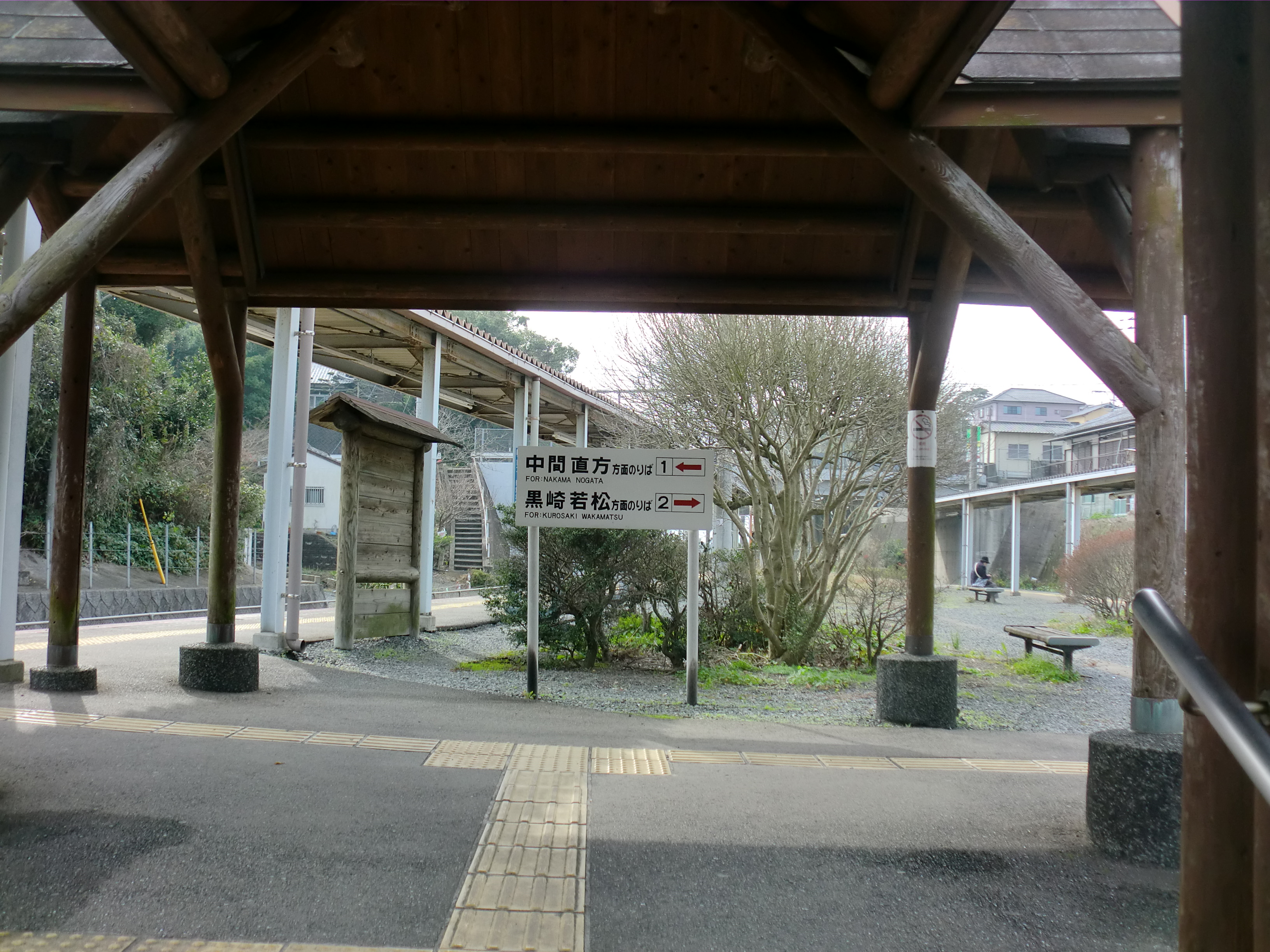
Entrance to the platforms from the station building. Note the platforms to the left and right of the wide, landscaped triangle.

== History ==
The station was opened by JR Kyushu on 13 March 1988 as an additional station on the existing Chikuhō Main Line track.

On 4 March 2017, Higashi-Mizumaki, along with several other stations on the line, became a remotely managed "Smart Support Station". Under this scheme, although the station is unstaffed, passengers using the automatic ticket vending machines or ticket gates can receive assistance via intercom from staff at a central support centre which is located at Nakama.

== Passenger statistics ==
In fiscal 2020, the station was used by a daily average of 324 boarding passengers, making it the 267th busiest station on the JR Kyushu network.。

== Surrounding area ==
- Mizumaki Kyoritsu Hospital
- Suihoku Daiichi Hospital
- Mizumaki Town Mizumaki Minami Junior High School

== See also ==
- List of railway stations in Japan
