= Iizuka Station =

Railway station in Iizuka, Fukuoka Prefecture, Japan

JC 13 Iizuka Station 飯塚駅
- Iizuka Station in May 2026

General information
- Location: 1-chōme-1 Komodanishi, Iizuka-shi, Fukuoka-ken 820-0017; Japan
- Coordinates: 33°37′42.64″N 130°41′21.84″E
- Operator: JR Kyushu
- Line: JC Chikuhō Main Line
- Distance: 39.4 km (24.5 mi) from Wakamatsu
- Platforms: 1 side + 1 island platforms
- Tracks: 3

Construction
- Structure type: At grade
- Parking: Available
- Cycle facilities: Bike shed

Other information
- Status: Unstaffed
- Website: Official website

History
- Opened: 3 July 1893

Passengers
- FY2020: 757 daily
- Rank: 171st (among JR Kyushu stations)

Services
| Preceding station | JR Kyushu | Following station |
|---|---|---|
| Tentō JC 12 towards Haruda | Chikuhō Main Line Local | Shin-Iizuka JC 14 towards Wakamatsu |
Location
- Location within Fukuoka Prefecture Location within Japan

Iizuka Station (飯塚駅, Iizuka-eki) is a passenger railway station located in the city of Iizuka, Fukuoka Prefecture, Japan. It is operated by JR Kyushu.

== Lines ==
The station is served by the Chikuhō Main Line and is located 39.4 kilometres (24.5 mi) from the starting point of the line at Wakamatsu.

== Station layout ==
The station consists of one side platform and one island platform, connected to the station building by a footbridge. The station is staffed.

=== Platforms ===
| 1 | ■ JC Chikuhō Main Line | for Nōgata and Orio |
| 2, 3 | ■ JC Chikuhō Main Line | for Shin-Iizuka and Hakata |

== History ==
The privately run Chikuho Kogyo Railway had opened a track from Wakamatsu to Nōgata on 30 August 1891 and by 28 October 1892, this had been extended southwards to Kotake. In the next phase of expansion, the track was further extended, with Iizuka being opened as the new southern terminus on 3 July 1893. On 1 October 1897, the Chikuho Kogyo Railway, now renamed the Chikuho Railway, merged with the Kyushu Railway. Iizuka became a through-station on 1 December 1901 when the Kyushu Railway extended the track to Nagao (now Keisen. After the Kyushu Railway was nationalized on 1 July 1907, Japanese Government Railways (JGR) took over control of the station. On 12 October 1909, the station became part of the Chikuho Main Line. With the privatization of Japanese National Railways (JNR), the successor of JGR, on 1 April 1987, control of the station passed to JR Kyushu.

== Passenger statistics ==
In fiscal 2020, the station was used by a daily average of 757 boarding passengers, making it the 171st busiest station on the JR Kyushu network.

== Surrounding area ==
The station was located near Iizuka City Hall and was the city's representative station, but in 1964, the city hall was moved to near Shin-Iizuka Station, which was in the outskirts of the city. The city's urban center has gradually moved in that direction.

- Kindai University Kyushu Junior College
- Iizuka City Komoda Elementary School

== See also ==
- List of railway stations in Japan
