= Katsuno =

Katsuno (written: 勝野) is a Japanese surname. Notable people with the surname include:

- Akiyoshi Katsuno (勝野 昌慶, born 1997), Japanese baseball player
- Hiroshi Katsuno (勝野 洋, born 1949), Japanese actor

== See also ==
- Katsuno Station, a railway station in Kotake, Kurate District, Fukuoka Prefecture, Japan
- 9067 Katsuno, a main-belt asteroid
