= Chikuzen-Yamae Station =

Railway station in Chikushino, Fukuoka Prefecture, Japan

JG 04 Chikuzen-Yamae Station 筑前山家駅
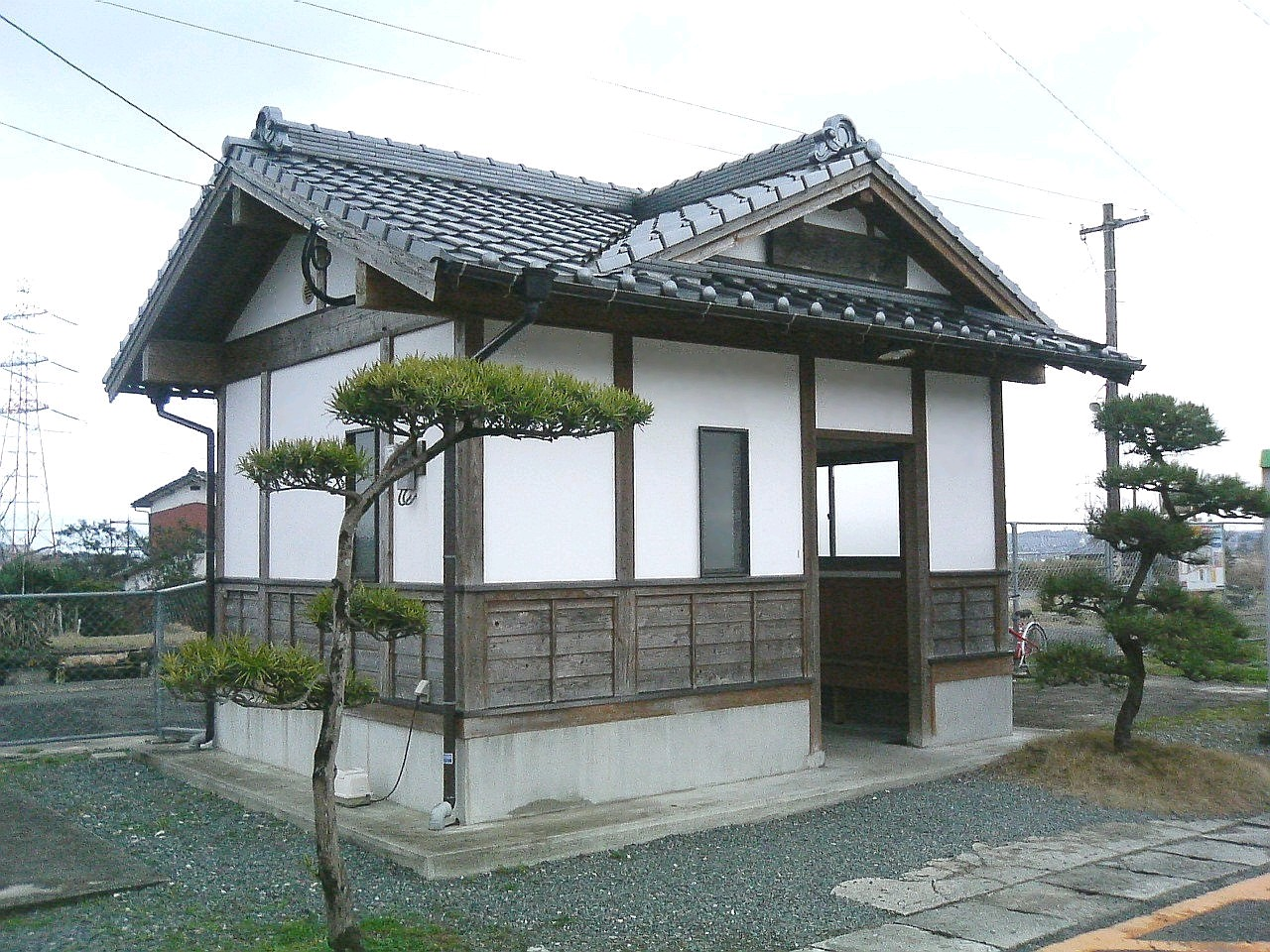
- Chikuzen-Yamae Station in 2007

General information
- Location: Yamae, Chikushino-shi, Fukuoka-ken 818-0003; Japan
- Coordinates: 33°28′39″N 130°34′27″E
- Operator: JR Kyushu
- Line: JG Chikuhō Main Line
- Distance: 61.4 km from Wakamatsu
- Platforms: 1 side platform
- Tracks: 1 + 1 siding

Construction
- Structure type: At grade

Other information
- Status: Unstaffed
- Website: Official website

History
- Opened: 7 December 1929

Passengers
- FY2016: 24

Services
Preceding station	JR Kyushu	Following station
Haruda JG 05 Terminus	Chikuhō Main Line (Haruda Line)	Chikuzen-Uchino JG 03 towards Keisen
Location
- Location within Fukuoka Prefecture Location within Japan

Chikuzen-Yamae Station (筑前山家駅, Chikuzen-Yamae-eki) is a passenger railway station located in the city of Chikushino, Fukuoka Prefecture, Japan. It is operated by JR Kyushu.

== Lines ==
The station is served by the Chikuhō Main Line and is located 61.4 km (38.2 mi) from the starting point of the line at Wakamatsu.

== Station layout ==
The station, which is unstaffed, consists of a side platform serving a single track. Across the track can be seen another, disused side platform as well as the track bed of a second track which has since been removed. A siding branches off the track and ends behind the platform and is used by track maintenance equipment. A small station building built in traditional Japanese style serves as a waiting room. A separate weather shelter is provided on the platform itself.

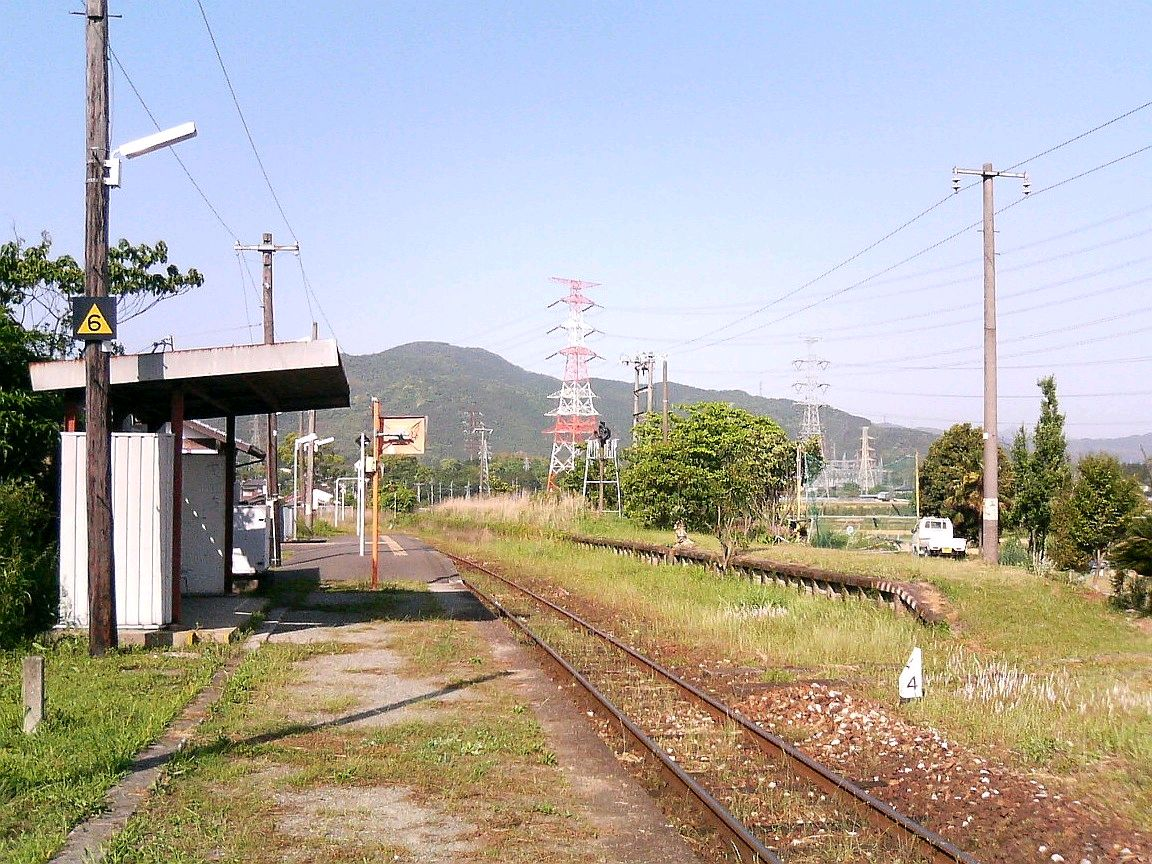
Station platform and track. Note the disused platform to the right.

== History ==
Japanese Government Railways (JGR) opened Chikuzen-Yamae on 7 December 1929 as an intermediate station when the track of Chikuho Main Line was extended to Haruda. With the privatization of Japanese National Railways (JNR), the successor of JGR, on 1 April 1987, control of the station passed to JR Kyushu.

Station numbering was introduced on 28 September 2018 with Chikuzen-Yamae being assigned station number JG04.

== Passenger statistics ==
In fiscal 2016, the station was used by an average of 25 passengers daily (boarding passengers only).

== Surrounding area ==
- Japan National Route 200
- Chikushino City Yamake Elementary School

== See also ==
- List of railway stations in Japan
