= Kotake, Fukuoka =

Kotake 小竹町
- Town
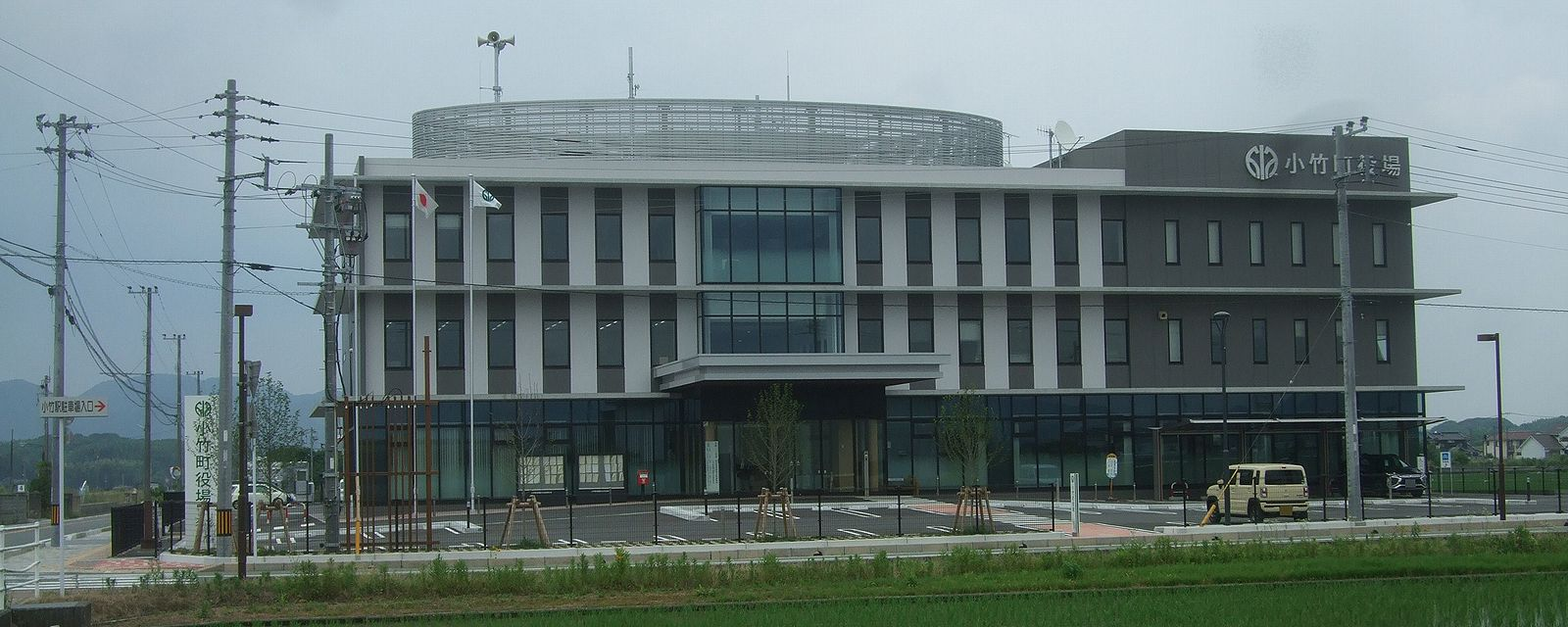
- Kotake Town Hall

- Flag Chapter
- Interactive map of Kotake
- Location in Japan
- Coordinates: 33°41′32.8″N 130°42′45.9″E
- Country: Japan
- Region: Kyushu
- Prefecture: Fukuoka
- District: Kurate

Area
  - Total: 14.28 km^{2} (5.51 sq mi)

Population (February 29, 2024)
  - Total: 6,983
  - Density: 489.0/km^{2} (1,267/sq mi)
- Time zone: UTC+09:00 (JST)
- City hall address: 3349 Katsuno, Kotake-cho, Kurate-gun, Fukuoka-ken 820-1192
- Website: Official website
- Symbols
- Flower: Sunflower
- Tree: Osmanthus fragrans

Kotake (小竹町, Kotake-machi) is a town located in Kurate District, Fukuoka Prefecture, Japan. As of 29 February 2024, the town had an estimated population of 6983 in 3374 households, and a population density of 490 persons per km^{2}. The total area of the town is 14.28 km^{2} (5.51 sq mi).

== Geography ==
Kotake is located in the northern part of the Chikuho district in central Fukuoka Prefecture, sandwiched between Nogata City and Iizuka City. It is located approximately 40 kilometers northeast of the center of Fukuoka City and approximately 40 kilometers southwest of the center of Kitakyushu City. The Onga River flows north-south through the center of the town. The area around the intersection of Japan National Route 200 and Fukuoka Prefectural Route 74 at the southern end of the town is the central urban area.

=== Neighboring municipalities ===
Fukuoka Prefecture

- Iizuka
- Miyawaka
- Nōgata

=== Climate ===
Kotake has a humid subtropical climate (Köppen Cfa) characterized by warm summers and cool winters with light to no snowfall. The average annual temperature in Kotake is 15.4 °C. The average annual rainfall is 1560 mm with September as the wettest month. The temperatures are highest on average in August, at around 26.7 °C, and lowest in January, at around 4.6 °C.

=== Demographics ===
Per Japanese census data, the population of Kotake is as shown below

Historical population
Year	Pop.	±%
1930	12,368	—
1940	14,321	+15.8%
1950	17,221	+20.2%
1960	18,877	+9.6%
1970	11,603	−38.5%
1980	11,228	−3.2%
1990	11,001	−2.0%
2000	9,730	−11.6%
2010	8,605	−11.6%
2020	7,151	−16.9%

== History ==
The area of Kotake was part of ancient Chikuzen Province. During the Edo Period, the area was under the control of Fukuoka Domain. After the Meiji restoration, the village of Katsuno was established with the creation of the modern municipalities system on April 1, 1889. Katsuno was raised to town status on January 1, 1928, and was renamed Kotake.

== Government ==
Kotake has a mayor-council form of government with a directly elected mayor and a unicameral town council of 12 members. Kotake, collectively with the city of Miyawaka and town of Kurate, contributes one member to the Fukuoka Prefectural Assembly. In terms of national politics, the town is part of the Fukuoka 8th district of the lower house of the Diet of Japan.

== Economy ==
During the Meiji period, Kotake, along with the other municipalities of the Chikuho area, developed with the Kitakyushu industrial zone through coal mining, and is still considered part of to the Greater Kitakyushu Metropolitan Area. However, as the demand for coal decreased due to the energy revolution, the coal mines that had sponsored prosperity have closed, leading to depopulation. The last coal mine closed in 1976. Efforts are being made to revitalize the former sites by reusing them as industrial parks.

== Education ==
Kotake has two public elementary schools and one public junior high school by the town government. The town does not have a high school.

== Transportation ==
=== Railways ===
JR Kyushu - Chikuhō Main Line

JC Kotake - Katsuno

Heisei Chikuhō Railway - Ita Line

■ Akaji

=== Highways ===
- National Route 200
- National Route 211
