= Fujinoki Station =

Railway station in Kitakyushu, Japan

Coordinates: 33°53′36″N 130°46′55″E

JE 05 Fujinoki Station 藤ノ木駅
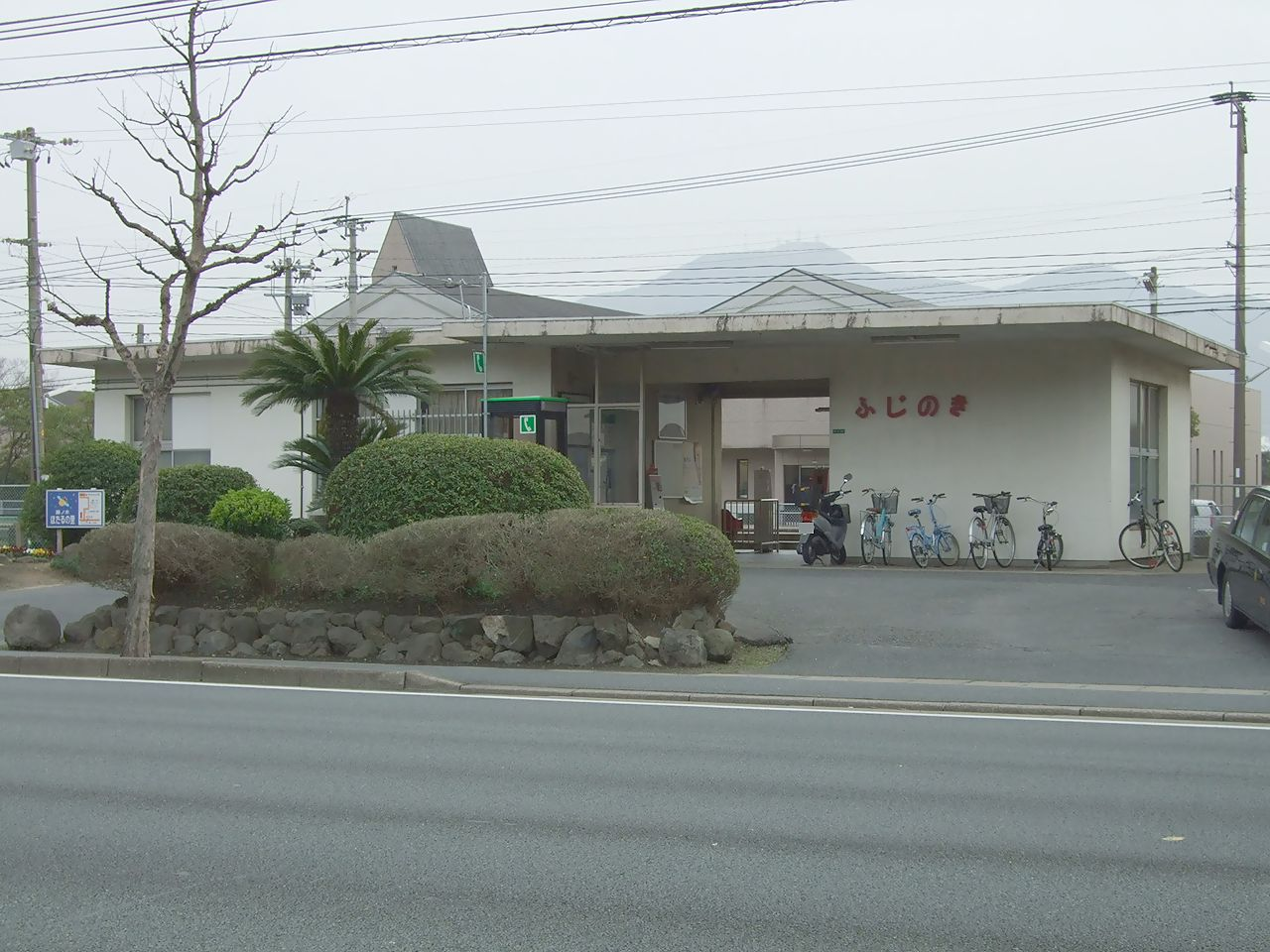

General information
- Location: 1-37 Akashima-machi, Wakamatsu Ward, Kitakyushu City, Fukuoka Prefecture; Japan
- Operator: JR Kyushu
- Line: JE Wakamatsu Line (Chikuhō Main Line
- Platforms: 2 side platforms
- Tracks: 2

Construction
- Structure type: At grade

Other information
- Station code: JE05

Passengers
- 2016: 559 daily

Services
Preceding station	JR Kyushu	Following station
Oku-Dōkai JE 04 towards Orio	Chikuhō Main Line (Wakamatsu Line) Local	Wakamatsu JE 06 Terminus
Location
- Location within Fukuoka Prefecture Location within Kyushu Location within Japan

Fujinoki Station (藤ノ木駅, Fujinoki-eki) is a railway station on the Kyūshū Railway Company (JR Kyūshū) Chikuhō Main Line (also known as the Wakamatsu Line) in Wakamatsu-ku, Kitakyushu, Fukuoka Prefecture, Japan.

== Station layout ==
1	■ Wakamatsu Line (Chikuhō Main Line)	for Wakamatsu
2	■ Wakamatsu Line (Chikuhō Main Line)	for Orio, Nakama, and Nōgata

== History ==
Japanese Government Railways (JGR) opened the station on 12 August 1944 as an additional station on the existing Chikuho Main Line track. With the privatization of Japanese National Railways (JNR), the successor of JGR, on 1 April 1987, control of the station passed to JR Kyushu.

On 4 March 2017, Fujinoki, along with several other stations on the line, became a "Smart Support Station". Under this scheme, although the station is unstaffed, passengers using the automatic ticket vending machines or ticket gates can receive assistance via intercom from staff at a central support centre which is located at Nakama.

== Surrounding area ==
It is the westernmost train station among four stations in Wakamatsu-ku, all of those are on the Chikuho Main Line. National Route 199 runs immediately north of the station. Other points of interest include:

- Wakamatsu Holiday Emergency Clinic - south of the station
- Nursing Home Lifeport Wakamatsu - southwest of the station
- Fujinoki Civic Center - 200m north
- Hakusan Shrine - 600m northwest
- Kitakyushu City Ishimine Junior High School - 600m west
- Kitakyushu City Fujinoki Elementary School - 800m west
