= Chikushino =

Chikushino 筑紫野市
- City
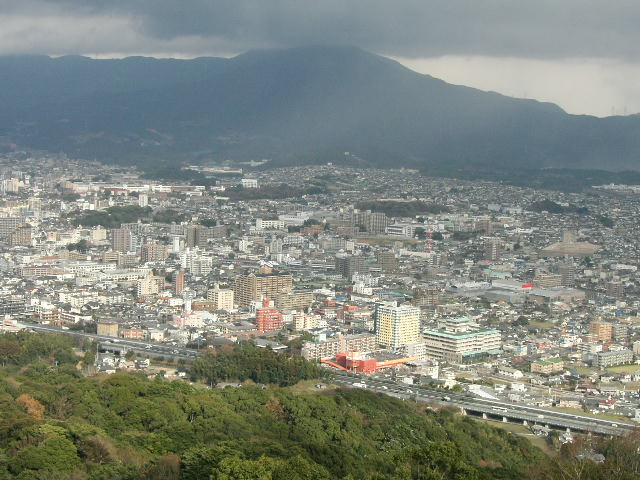
- Panoramic view of downtown Futsukaichi

- Flag Emblem
- Interactive map of Chikushino
- Location in Japan
- Coordinates: 33°29′15″N 130°31′33″E
- Country: Japan
- Region: Kyushu
- Prefecture: Fukuoka

Government
  - Mayor: Shirō Hirabaru

Area
  - Total: 87.73 km^{2} (33.87 sq mi)

Population (February 29, 2024)
  - Total: 106,513
  - Density: 1,214/km^{2} (3,145/sq mi)
- Time zone: UTC+09:00 (JST)
- City hall address: Nishi Itchōme 1-1, Hatsukaichi, Chikushino-shi, Fukuoka-ken 818-8686
- Website: Official website
- Symbols
- Flower: Scarlet Sage
- Tree: Camellia

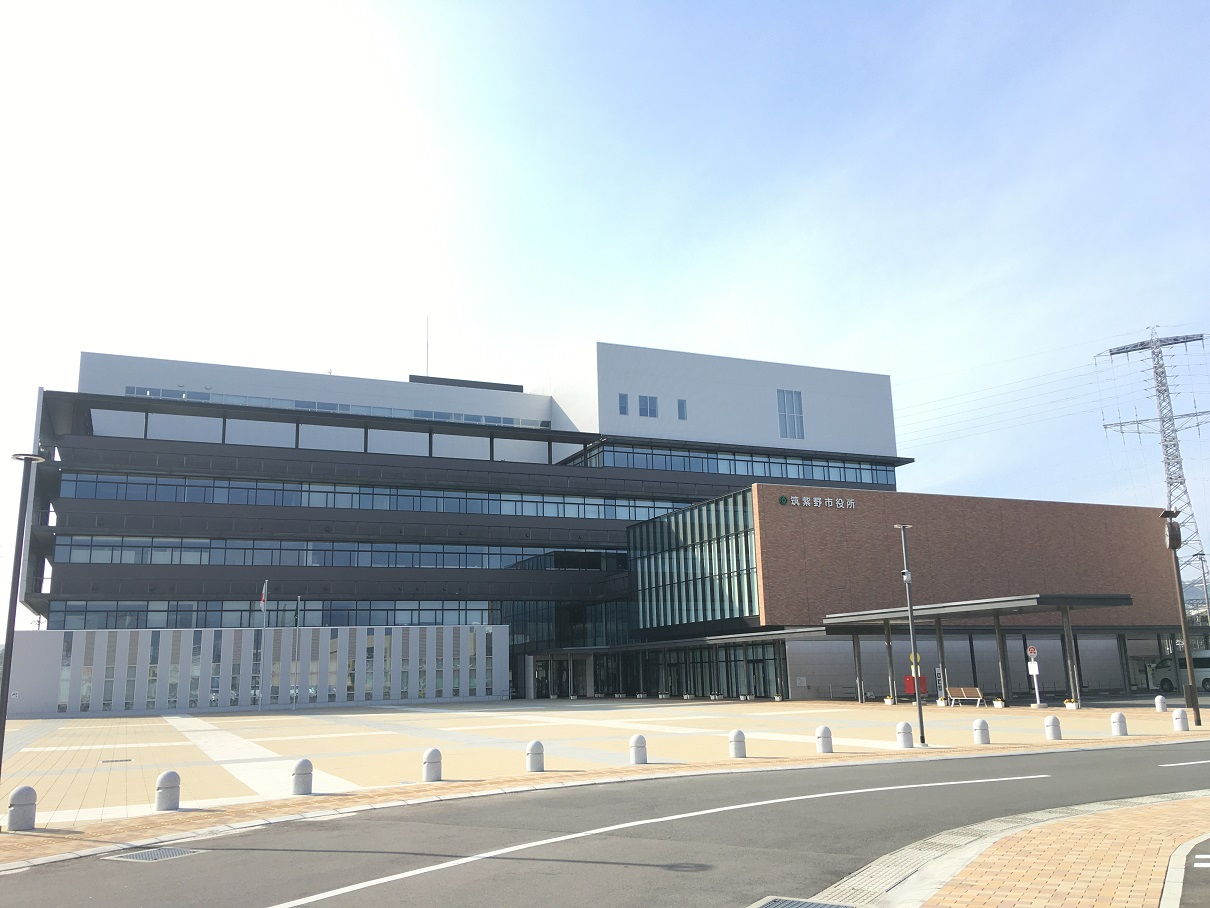
Chikushino City Hall

Chikushino (筑紫野市, Chikushino-shi) is a city in Fukuoka Prefecture, Japan. As of 29 February 2024, the city had an estimated population of 106,513 in 48029 households, and a population density of 1200 persons per km^{2}. The total area of the city is 87.73 km^{2} (33.87 sq mi).

== Geography ==
Chikushino is located in the central part of Fukuoka Prefecture, bordering Saga Prefecture in the southwest. The area near the prefectural border with Saga Prefecture is part of the Sefuri Mountain Range, and includes mountains such as Kiyama and Gongenyama. The area near the border with Iizuka City from the northeast to the east is part of the Sangun mountain range, with mountains such as Mt. Homan, 800 to 900 meters above sea level. The city is located approximately 15 kilometers south of the prefectural capital at Fukuoka City and approximately 20 kilometers north of Kurume.

=== Neighboring municipalities ===
Fukuoka Prefecture

- Chikuzen
- Dazaifu
- Iizuka
- Nakagawa
- Ogōri
- Ōnojō
- Umi

Saga Prefecture

- Kiyama
- Tosu

=== Climate ===
Chikushino has a humid subtropical climate (Köppen Cfa) characterized by warm summers and cool winters with light to no snowfall. The average annual temperature in Chikushino is 14.9 °C. The average annual rainfall is 1766 mm with September as the wettest month. The temperatures are highest on average in August, at around 26.2 °C, and lowest in January, at around 4.1 °C.

=== Demographics ===
Per Japanese census data, the population of Chikushino is as shown below

Historical population
Year	Pop.	±%
1940	19,762	—
1950	27,151	+37.4%
1960	30,614	+12.8%
1970	38,876	+27.0%
1980	57,966	+49.1%
1990	70,303	+21.3%
2000	93,049	+32.4%
2010	100,190	+7.7%
2020	103,311	+3.1%

== History ==
The area of Chikushino was part of ancient Chikuzen Province, During the Edo Period it was part of the holdings of Fukuoka Domain. After the Meiji restoration, the villages of Futsukaichi, Yamaguchi, Chikushi, Mikasa, and Yamaga were established. Futsukaichi was raised to town status on August 27, 1895. On March 1, 1955 Futsukaichi merged with the villages of Yamaguchi, Chikushi, Mikasa, and Yamaga and was renamed Chikushino Town. It was raised to city status on April 1, 1972.

== Government ==
Chikushino has a mayor-council form of government with a directly elected mayor and a unicameral city council of 22 members. Chikushino contributes two members to the Fukuoka Prefectural Assembly. In terms of national politics, the city is part of the Fukuoka 5th district of the lower house of the Diet of Japan.

== Economy ==
Chikushino is a regional commercial center, with an economy centered on agriculture and light manufacturing. It has traditionally been one of the main administrative bases in the Chikushi region, and is home to administrative agencies such as the tax office, legal affairs bureau, and police station that have jurisdiction over the area. In addition, wide-area administration such as water supply, fire department, garbage disposal, and crematoriums have close cooperation within the district.

== Education ==
Chikushino has 11 public elementary schools and 5 public junior high schools operated by the city government and two public high schools operated by the Fukuoka Prefectural Board of Education. There are also two private high schools. The prefecture also operates two schools for the handicapped.

== Transportation ==
=== Railways ===
JR Kyushu - Kagoshima Main Line

JA Futsukaichi - Tenpaizan - Haruda

JR Kyushu - Chikuhō Main Line

JG - Haruda - Chikuzen-Yamae

Nishitetsu Tenjin Ōmuta Line

- Nishitetsu Futsukaichi - Murasaki - Asakuragaidō - Sakuradai - Chikushi

Dazaifu Line

- Nishitetsu Futsukaichi

=== Highways ===
- Kyushu Expressway
- National Route 3
- National Route 200
- National Route 386

== Local attractions ==
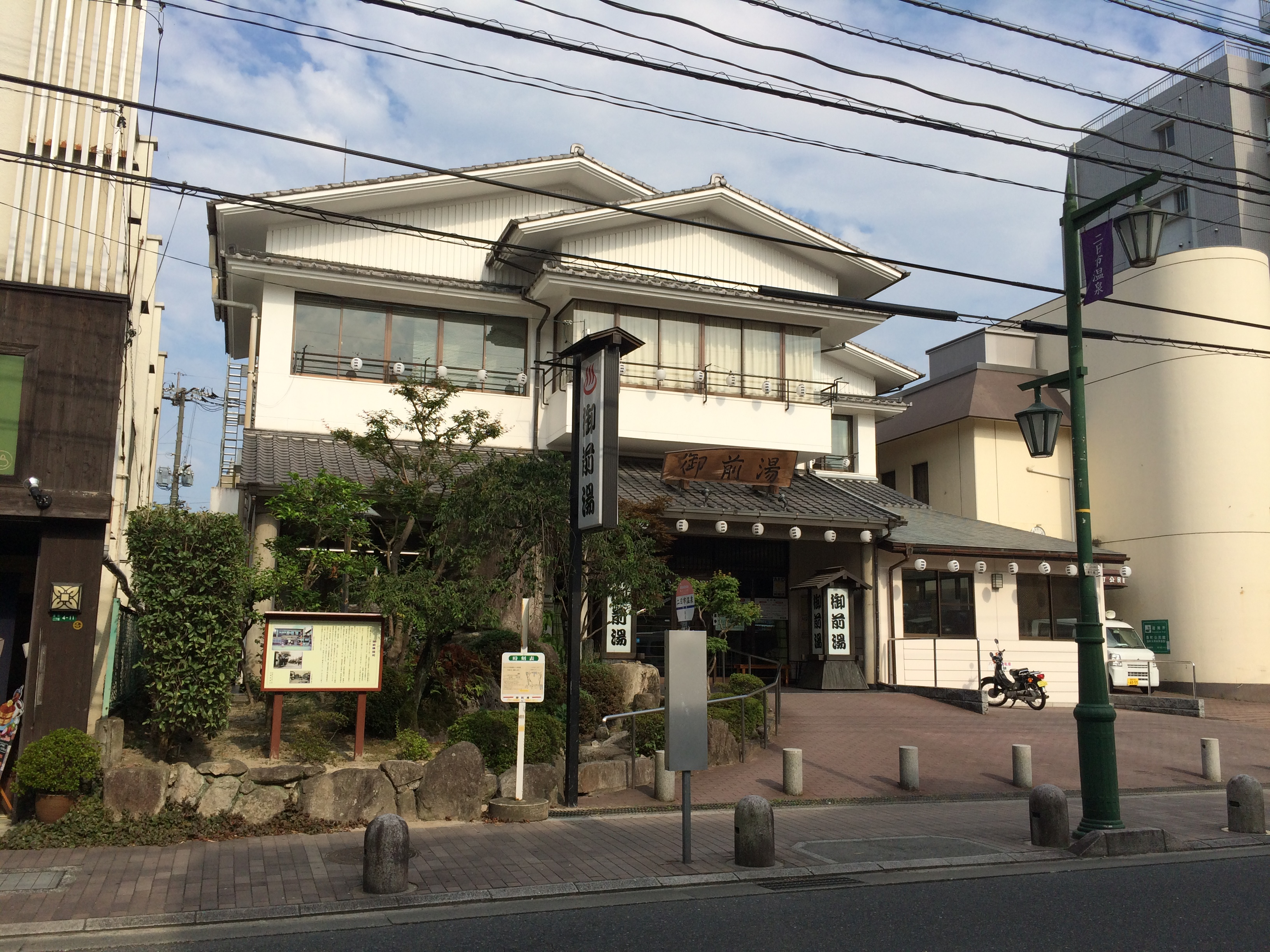
Gōzen-yu, a public bath in Futsukaichi Onsen

- Ashikisan Castle ruins
- Futsukaichi Onsen
- Gorōyama Kofun, National Historic Site
- Kii Castle, Special National Historic Site
- Mount Hōman and Tenpaizan
- Tōnobaru Pagoda Site
- Zenrinkyo headquarters
