= Kyushu Railway =

Former railway company encompassing Kyushu

Overview
- Headquarters: Moji, Fukuoka
- Locale: Kyushu, Japan
- Dates of operation: 1889–1907
- Successor: Japanese Government Railways

Technical
- Track gauge: 1,067 mm (3 ft 6 in)
- Length: 442.8 miles (1907)

Kyushu Railway (九州鉄道, Kyūshū Tetsudō) was a company that built and operated railways in Kyushu, one of four main islands of Japan. Most of its lines came under the control of Japanese Government Railways following nationalization in 1907, and many are now operated by Kyushu Railway Company.

== History ==
The company was incorporated on August 15, 1888 in Fukuoka, Fukuoka. The first 22 miles (35 km) of the railway, between Hakata Station in Fukuoka and Chitosegawa temporary station in Asahi, Saga (near Kurume, Fukuoka), opened on December 11, 1889 as the first railway in Kyushu.

The company expanded the railway by means of both construction and acquisition of other companies. As of 1907, it operated 442.8 miles (712.6 km) of railways in Fukuoka, Kumamoto, Nagasaki, Ōita and Saga prefectures in northern Kyushu.

On July 1, 1907, the entire operation of the company was purchased by the government of Japan under the Railway Nationalization Act. Consequently, the company was dissolved.

== List of lines ==
Operation of Kyushu Railway as of June 30, 1907
Endpoints (Present station names in parentheses)	Length (miles)	Line names (designated after nationalization)	Notes
Moji (Mojikō) – Yatsushiro	143.4	Kagoshima Main Line	via Ōkura
Kokura – Usa (Yanagigaura)	42.6	Nippō Main Line	
Kokura – Kurosaki	8.8	Kagoshima Main Line	via Tobata
Wakamatsu – Kami-Yamada	33.3	Chikuhō Main Line, Kami-Yamada Line	
Hakata – Sasaguri	7.4	Sasaguri Line	
Tosu – Nagasaki	98.6	Nagasaki Main Line, Sasebo Line, Ōmura Line	
Kubota – Nishi-Karatsu	26.8	Karatsu Line	
Arita – Imari	8.1	Matsuura Line	
Haiki – Sasebo	5.5	Sasebo Line	
Uto – Misumi	15.9	Misumi Line	
Yukuhashi – Soeda (Nishi-Soeda)	23.1	Tagawa Line, Hitahikosan Line	
Nōgata – Ita (Tagawa-Ita)	9.9	Ita Line	
Kotake – Kōbukuro	3.0	Kōbukuro Line	
Iizuka – Nagao (Keisen)	3.6	Chikuhō Main Line	
Gotōji (Tagawa-Gotōji) – Miyatoko (Itoda)	1.9	Itoda Line	
Katsuno – Kirino (Chikuzen-Miyada)	3.2	Miyada Line	
Katsuno – Sugamuta	2.7	Tagawa Line	Freight
Soeda (Nishi-Soeda) – Shō	0.6	Tagawa Line	Freight
Kawara (Magarikane) – Natsuyoshi	1.5	Tagawa Line	Freight
Gotōji (Tagawa Gotōji) – Kigyō	0.6	Gotōji Line	Freight
Kawasaki (Buzen-Kawasaki) – Daini-Ōtō	1.2	Hitahikosan Line	Freight
Azamibaru (Taku) – Yunokibaru	0.8	Karatsu Line	Freight
Ōchi junction – Ōchi	0.5	Karatsu Line	Freight
Ōshima – Nishi-Karatsu	0.8	Karatsu Line	Freight
(Overlap of Hakata – Yoshizuka)	(1.0)		
Total	442.8		

== Rolling stock ==
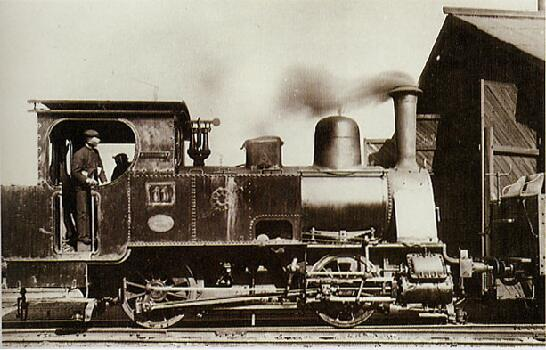
Class 4 (No. 11) made by Krauss in Germany

A special coach made by German car manufacturer van der Zypen & Charlier was imported by Kyushu Railway for VIP use in 1891. The coach was improved and designated as the imperial coach in 1902 for use by Emperor Meiji when he visited an army drill in Kumamoto Prefecture. After the nationalization, the coach was called the imperial coach No. 2 but was not used again by the emperor. It was designated a railway heritage (鉄道記念物, tetsudō kinenbutsu) in 1963 and is now exhibited at the Railway Museum in Saitama.

Fleet of Kyushu Railway
Year	Steam locomotives	Passenger cars	Freight cars etc.	
Year	Steam locomotives	Passenger cars	Wagons	Trucks
1890	3	38	107	
1900	159	302	649	3,173
1906	244	392	1,048	5,300

== Kyushu Railway History Museum ==
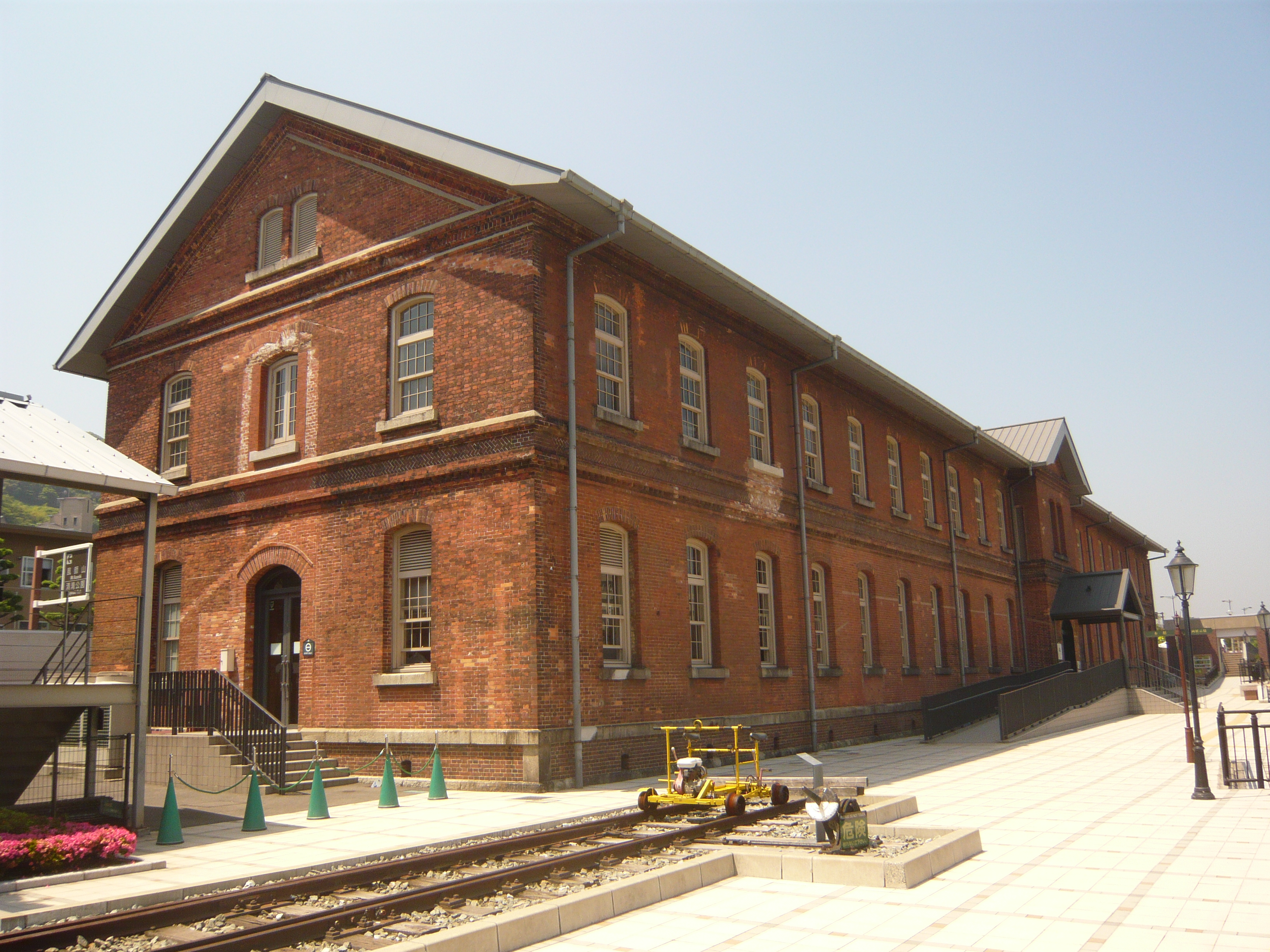
Kyushu Railway History Museum, the former headquarters of the company

The Kyushu Railway History Museum was established near Mojikō Station in Kitakyūshū in 2003. The red-brick main building of the museum is the former headquarters of Kyushu Railway.
