= Haruda Station =

Railway station in Chikushino, Fukuoka Prefecture, Japan

JB 10 JG 05 Haruda Station 原田駅
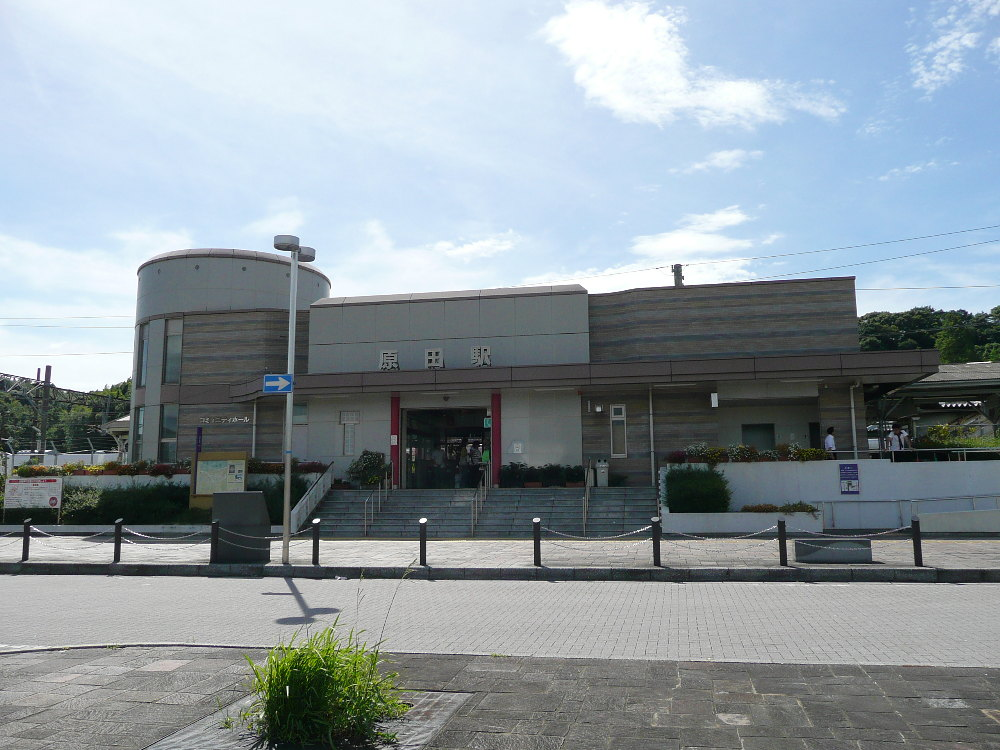
- Haruda Station in August 2007

General information
- Location: Haruda, Chikushino-shi, Fukuoka-ken 818-0024; Japan
- Coordinates: 33°27′06″N 130°32′22″E
- Operator: JR Kyushu
- Lines: JB Kagoshima Main Line; JG Haruda Line (Chikuhō Main Line)
- Distance: 97.9 km (60.8 mi) from Mojikō (Kagoshima Main Line); 66.1 km (41.1 mi) from Wakamatsu (Chikuho Main Line)
- Platforms: 2 side + 1 island + 1 Bay platform
- Tracks: 5

Construction
- Structure type: At grade
- Parking: Available
- Accessible: Yes - footbridge to platforms equipped with elevators

Other information
- Status: Staffed ticket window (Midori no Madoguchi)
- Station code: JB10; JG05
- Website: Official website

History
- Opened: 11 December 1889; 136 years ago

Passengers
- FY2021: 3,176 daily (boarding only)
- Rank: 50th (among JR Kyushu stations)

Services
Preceding station	JR Kyushu	Following station
Kiyama JB 12 towards Kagoshima	Kagoshima Main Line Rapid Semi-rapid	Futsukaichi JB 08 towards Mojikō
Keyakidai JB 11 towards Kagoshima	Kagoshima Main Line Local	Tenpaizan JB 09 towards Mojikō
Terminus	Chikuhō Main Line (Haruda Line)	Chikuzen-Yamae JG 04 towards Keisen
Location
- Location within Fukuoka Prefecture Location within Japan

Haruda Station (原田駅, Haruda-eki) is a junction passenger railway station located in the city of Chikushino, Fukuoka Prefecture, Japan. It is operated by JR Kyushu.

== Lines ==
The station is served by the Kagoshima Main Line and is located 97.9 km (60.8 mi) from the starting point of the line at Mojikō.

The station is also the southern terminus of the Chikuho Main Line and is located 66.1 km (41.1 mi) from the starting point of the line at Wakamatsu.

Only local and (in the case of the Kagoshima Main Line) some rapid services stop at the station.

== Layout ==
The station consists of two side platforms, an island platform and a semi-bay platform serving five tracks. The semi-bay platform is designated as platform 0 and juts into the other side of platform 1 which is a side platform attached to the station building. Platform 0 is used by the Chikuho Main Line only. The station building is a modern concrete structure and houses a waiting area and a JR ticket window (with a Midori no Madoguchi facility). From platform 1, attached to the station building, access to the island and other side platform by means of a footbridge which is served by elevators. A ramp also leads up to the station entrance from the station forecourt.

=== Platforms ===
0	■ JG Chikuho Main Line	for Chikuzen-Uchino and Keisen
1, 2	■ JB Kagoshima Main Line	for Kurume and Ōmuta
3, 4	■ JB Kagoshima Main Line	for Hakata and Kokura

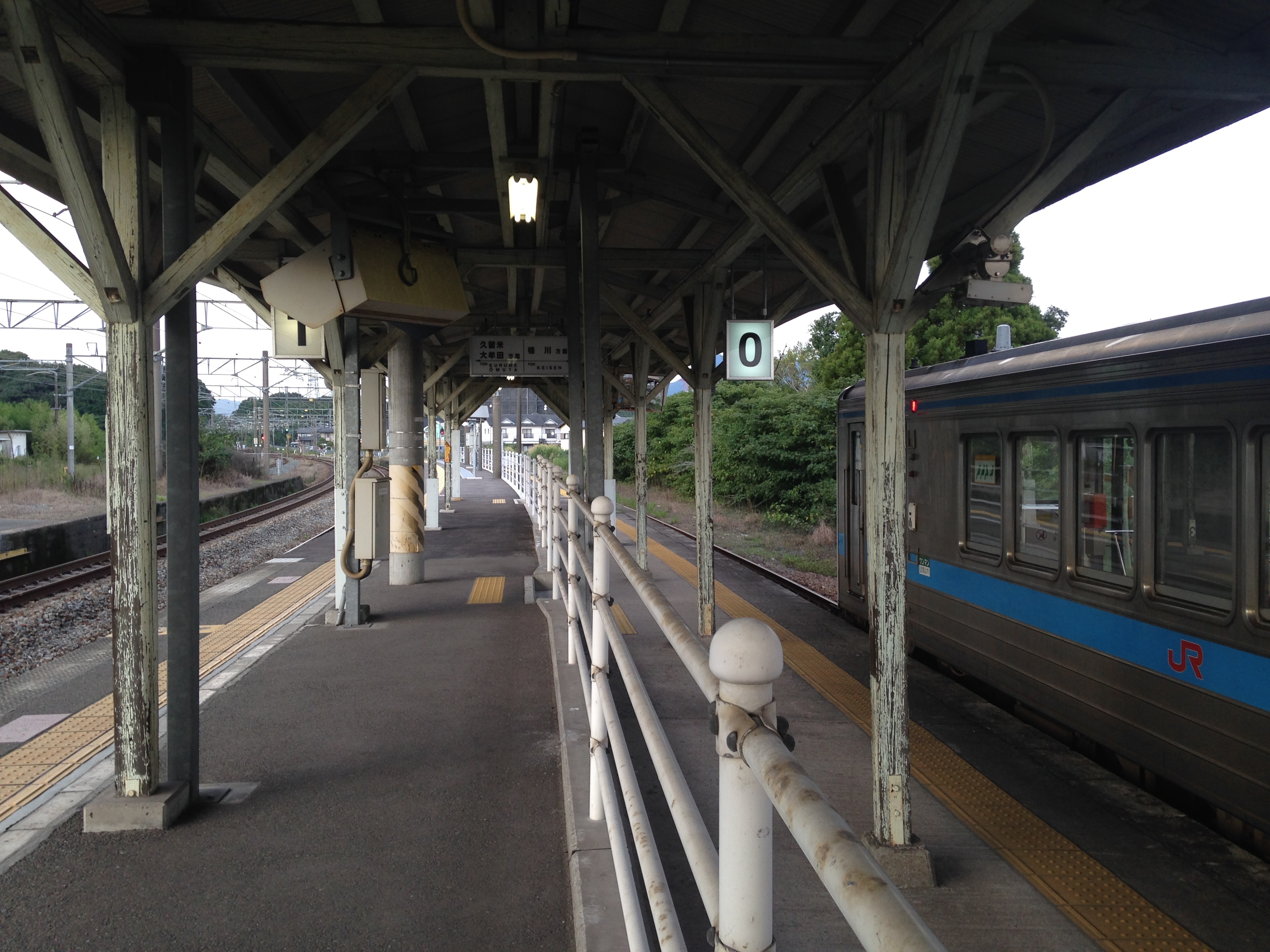
A view of platforms 1 and 0 (to the right).

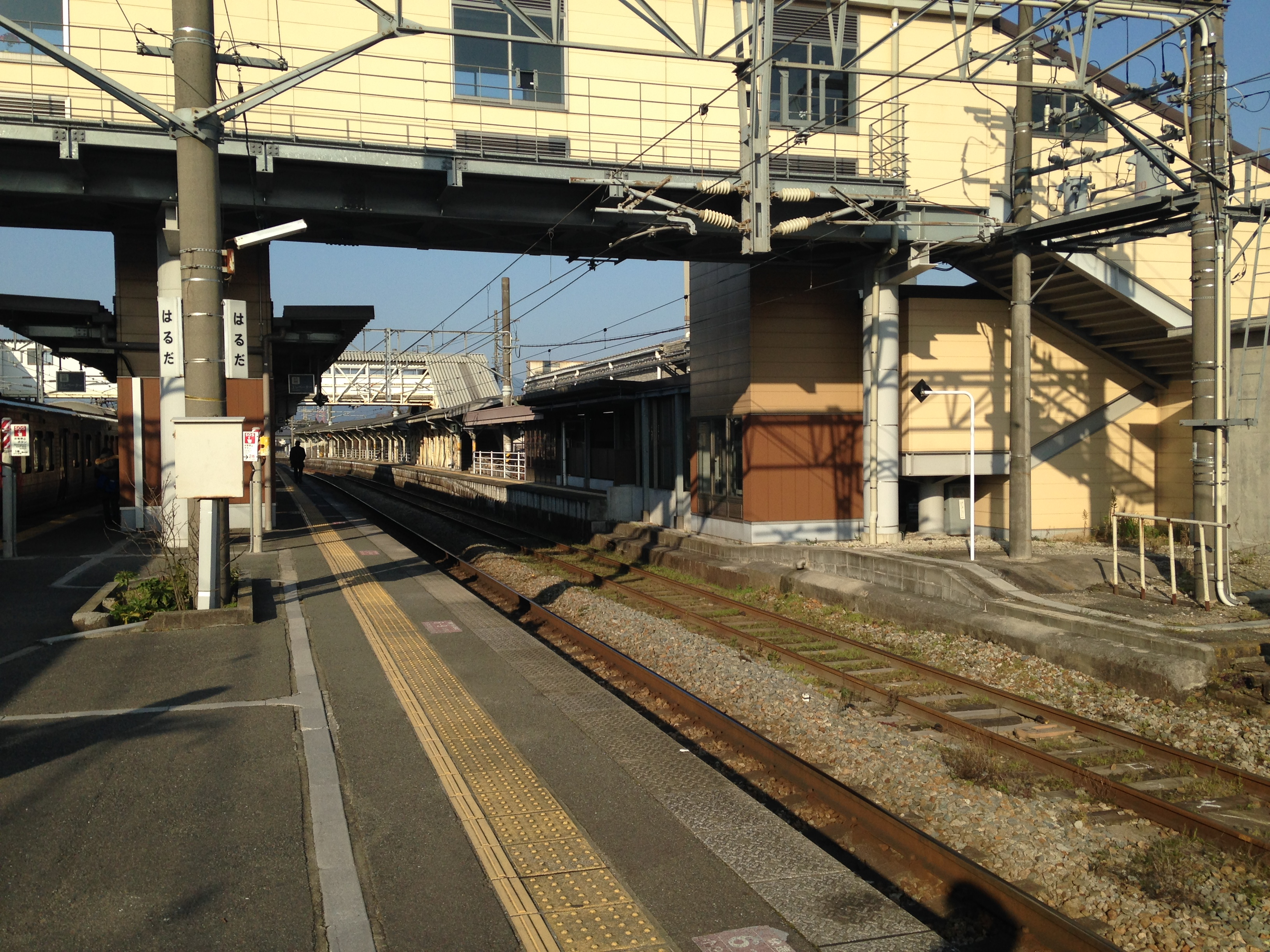
The footbridge linking the platforms. Note the elevator shafts.

== History ==
The station was opened on 11 December 1889 by the privately run Kyushu Railway after the construction of a track between Hakata and the (now closed) Chitosegawa temporary stop with Tosu as one of several intermediate stations on the line. When the Kyushu Railway was nationalized on 1 July 1907, Japanese Government Railways (JGR) took over control of the station. On 12 October 1909, the station became part of the Hitoyoshi Main Line and then on 21 November 1909, part of the Kagoshima Main Line. On 7 December 1929, JGR extended the Chikuho Main Line from Chikuzen-Uchino to Haruda, making it the southern terminus of the line. With the privatization of Japanese National Railways (JNR), the successor of JGR, on 1 April 1987, JR Kyushu took over control of the station.

Station numbering was introduced on 28 September 2018 with Haruda being assigned station number JB10 for the Kagoshima Main Line and JG05 for the Haruda Line.

== Passenger statistics ==
In fiscal 2020, the station was used by an average of 3059 passengers daily (boarding passengers only), and it ranked 51st among the busiest stations of JR Kyushu.

== Surrounding area ==
- Haruda Community Center
- Gorōyama Kofun
- Fukuoka Tokoha High School
- Chikushino City Chikushino Minami Junior High School

== See also ==
- List of railway stations in Japan
