= Chikuhō Main Line =

Railway line in Fukuoka Prefecture, Japan

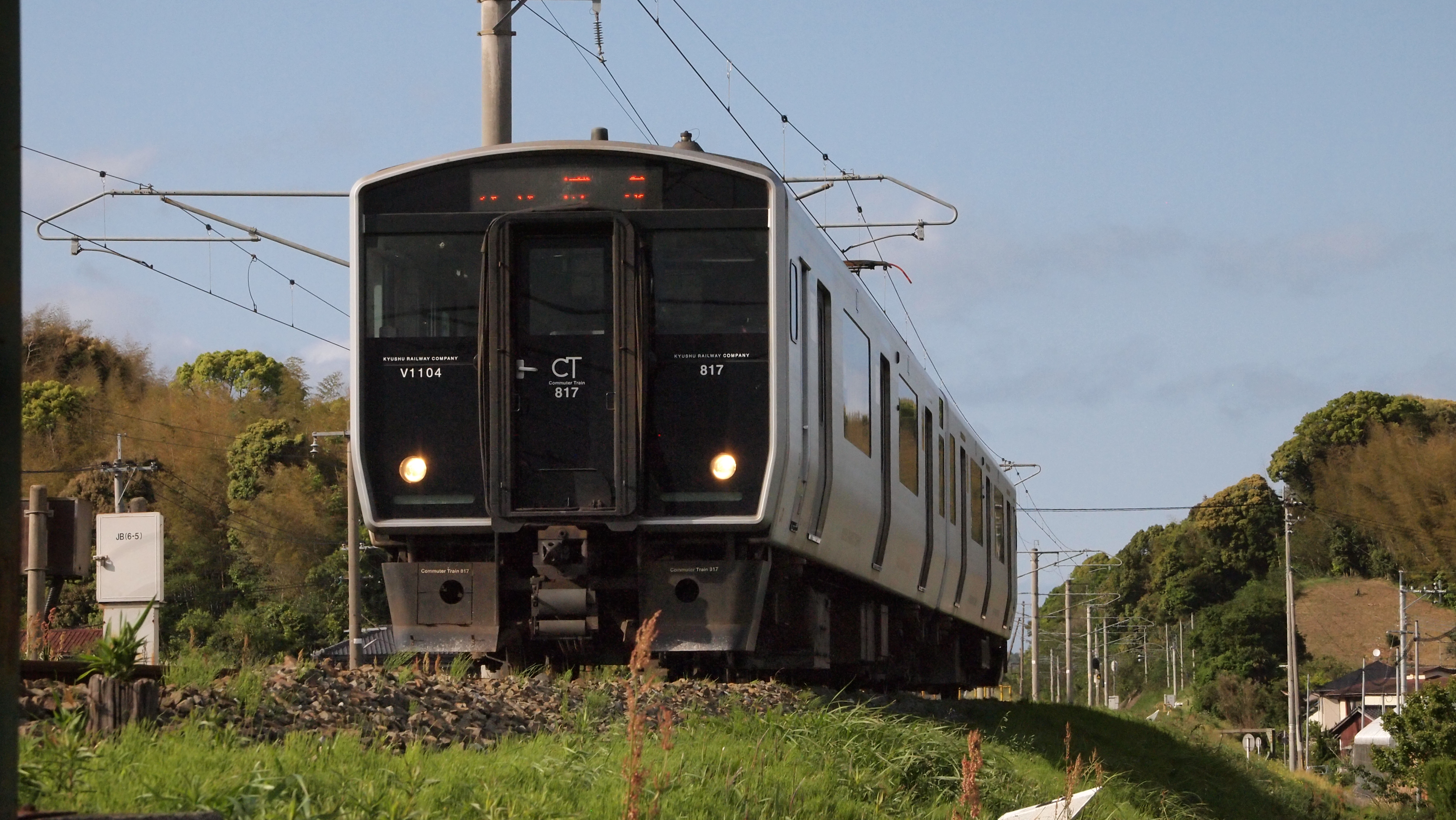
- JR Kyushu 817 series EMU operating on the Chikuhō Main Line

Overview
- Owner: JR Kyushu
- Locale: Kitakyushu
- Termini: Wakamatsu; Haruda
- Stations: 25

Service
- Type: Regional rail

History
- Opened: 1891; 135 years ago

Technical
- Line length: 66.1 km (41.1 mi)
- Number of tracks: 2 (Wakamatsu–Iizuka)
- Track gauge: 1,067 mm (3 ft 6 in)
- Electrification: Overhead line, 20 kV 60 Hz AC (Orio–Keisen)
Route map
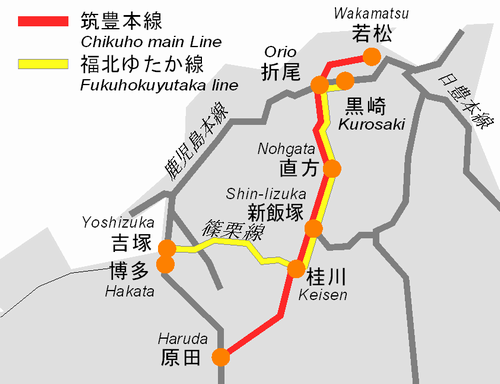

The Chikuhō Main Line (Japanese: 筑豊本線, Hepburn: Chikuhō-honsen) is a railway line in Fukuoka Prefecture, Japan, operated by Kyushu Railway Company (JR Kyushu). It connects Wakamatsu Station in Kitakyushu with Haruda Station in Chikushino. Between Orio Station and Haruda Station, as well as from Keisen Station via the Sasaguri Line to Yoshizuka Station, the line functions as an alternate route to the Kagoshima Main Line.

== Line data ==
As of 2021, the Chikuho Main Line is the third shortest of all Japan Railways Group lines named Main (or trunk) Line (not counting the JR Shikoku main lines, which were stripped of their designation after JR Shikoku started operating). For comparison, the shortest is Hidaka Main Line (30.5 km), after the closure of 116.0 km due to storm damage in 2015.

The line is divided into three sections. Each section has an alias.

Wakamatsu Line
Wakamatsu–Orio, 10.8 km
Fukuhoku Yutaka Line
Orio–Keisen, 34.5 km
Haruda Line
Keisen–Haruda, 20.8 km

== Stations ==
All stations are in Fukuoka Prefecture.

=== Wakamatsu Line ===
| No. | Station | Distance (km) | Transfers | Location |
|---|---|---|---|---|
| JE 06 | Wakamatsu | 0.0 | | Wakamatsu-ku, Kitakyūshū |
| JE 05 | Fujinoki | 2.9 | | Wakamatsu-ku, Kitakyūshū |
| JE 04 | Oku-Dōkai | 4.6 | | Wakamatsu-ku, Kitakyūshū |
| JE 03 | Futajima | 6.3 | | Wakamatsu-ku, Kitakyūshū |
| JE 02 | Honjō | 9.3 | | Yahata Nishi-ku, Kitakyūshū |
| JE 01 | Orio | 10.8 | JA Kagoshima Main Line (JA19); JC Fukuhoku Yutaka Line (JC26) | Yahata Nishi-ku, Kitakyūshū |

=== Fukuhoku Yutaka Line ===
Legend:

| ● | All trains stop |
| ▲ | Some trains stop |
| ｜ | All trains pass |

| No. | Station | Distance (km) | Rapid | Transfers | Location |
|---|---|---|---|---|---|
| JC 26 | Orio | 0.0 | ● | JA Kagoshima Main Line (JA19); JE Wakamatsu Line (JE01) | Yahata Nishi-ku, Kitakyūshū |
| JC 25 | Higashi Mizumaki | 2.7 | ▲ | | Mizumaki, Onga District |
| JC 24 | Nakama | 4.1 | ▲ | | Nakama |
| JC 23 | Chikuzen Habu | 5.6 | ▲ | | Nakama |
| JC 22 | Kurate | 7.9 | ▲ | | Kurate, Kurate District |
| JC 21 | Chikuzen Ueki | 10.4 | ▲ | | Nōgata |
| JC 20 | Shinnyū | 12.0 | ▲ | | Nōgata |
| JC 19 | Nōgata | 14.0 | ● | ■ Heisei Chikuhō Railway Ita Line | Nōgata |
| JC 18 | Katsuno | 16.7 | ｜ | | Kotake, Kurate District |
| JC 17 | Kotake | 20.5 | ● | | Kotake, Kurate District |
| JC 16 | Namazuta | 23.9 | ● | | Iizuka |
| JC 15 | Urata | 25.4 | ● | | Iizuka |
| JC 14 | Shin Iizuka | 26.8 | ● | JJ Gotōji Line (JJ01) | Iizuka |
| JC 13 | Iizuka | 28.6 | ● | | Iizuka |
| JC 12 | Tentō | 31.5 | ● | | Iizuka |
| JC 11 | Keisen | 34.5 | ● | JG Haruda Line (JG01) | Keisen, Kaho District |
↓ Through service to/from 00 Hakata via the Sasaguri and Kagoshima Main lines ↓

=== Haruda Line ===
| No. | Station | Distance (km) | Transfers | Location |
|---|---|---|---|---|
| JG 01 | Keisen | 0.0 | JC Fukuhoku Yutaka Line (JC11) | Keisen, Kaho District |
| JG 02 | Kami Honami | 2.8 | | Iizuka |
| JG 03 | Chikuzen Uchino | 5.9 | | Iizuka |
| JG 04 | Chikuzen Yamae | 16.1 | | Chikushino |
| JG 05 | Haruda | 20.8 | JB Kagoshima Main Line (JB10) | Chikushino |

== Rolling stock ==
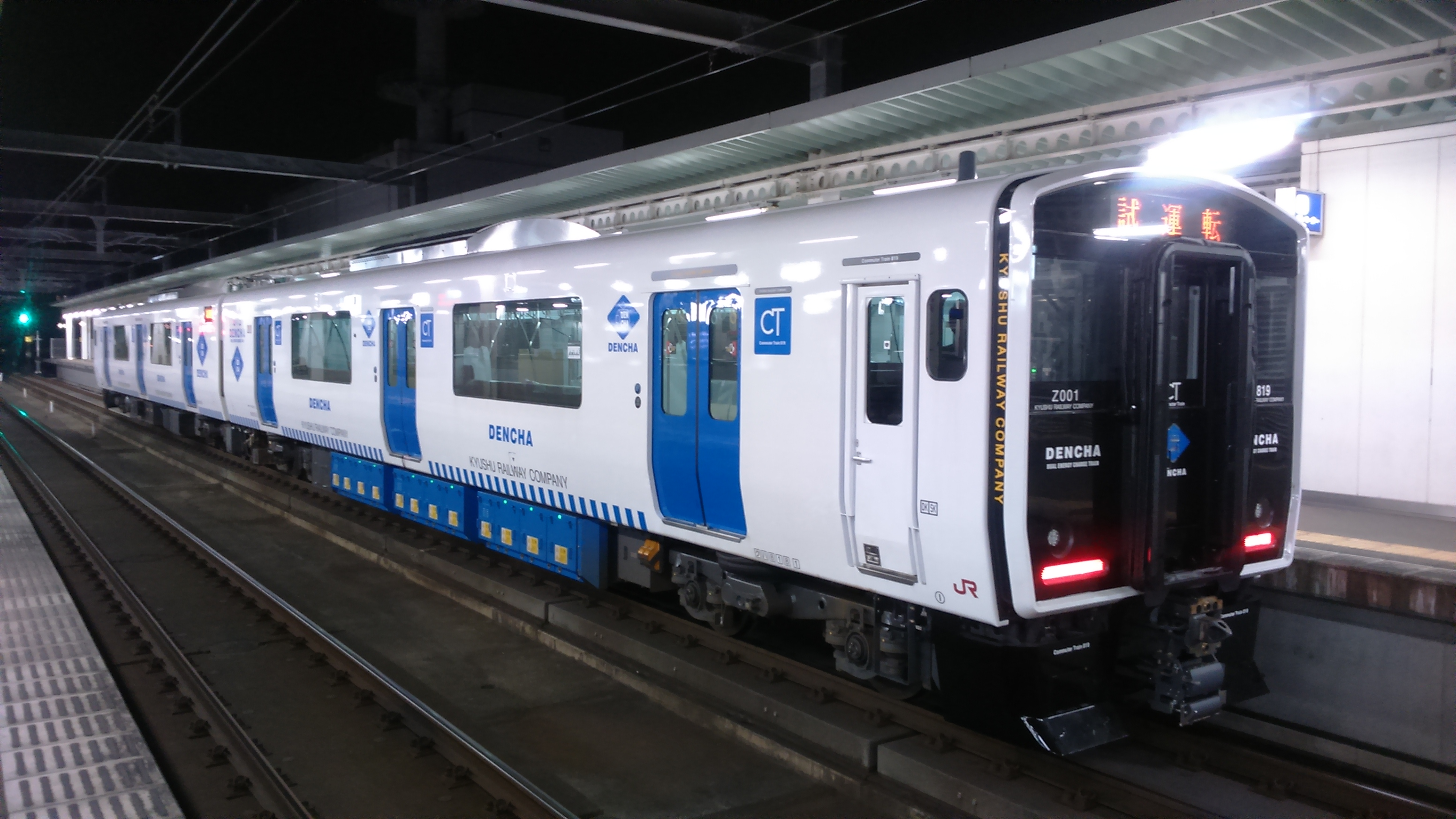
The first BEC819 series BEMU set undergoing testing in June 2016

A pre-series two-car BEC819 series AC battery electric multiple unit (BEMU) was tested on the line from April 2016, and entered revenue service on 19 October 2016. This will be followed by six more trainsets, entering service in spring 2017.

== History ==
The 39 km Wakamatsu to Iizuka section was built by the Chikuho Kogyo Railway, opening between 1891 and 1893, with the 12 km extension to Chikuzen Uchino opening in 1895. The company was nationalised in 1907, with the 15 km Chikuzen Uchino to Haruda section opening in 1929.

The 25 km section from Wakamatsu to Nogata was double-tracked between 1893 and 1896, with the 4 km Nogata to Kotake section double-tracked between 1904 and 1906. The 8 km Kotake to Iizuka section was double-tracked between 1942 and 1944.

The 35 km Orio to Keisen section was electrified in 2001.

=== Former connecting/transfer lines ===
- Orio Station: the Nishitetsu Kitakyushu Line, a 1,435 mm (4 ft 8 1/2 in) gauge line electrified at 600 V DC was opened from Orio - Moji (29 km) between 1911 and 1914. It connected to a 10 km loop line opened between 1912 and 1929, and closed in 1985. The Moji - Sunatsu section closed in 1985, the Sunatsu - Kurosaki section closed in 1992, and the remainder (except for the 1 km Kurosaki - Kumanishi section, which is part of the Chikuho Electric Railway line) closed in 2000.
- Nakama Station: the 3.5 km Katsuki Line opened in 1908, with passenger services being introduced in 1912. Freight services ceased in 1974, and the line closed in 1985. A 3.8 km line from Katsuki hauled coal from 1915 until the mine closed in 1954.
- Nogata Station: A 14 km 3 ft (914 mm) gauge line to Fukumaru operated from 1914 until 1938.
- Katsuno Station: the 5 km Miyata Line opened in 1902. Freight services ceased in 1982, and the line closed in 1989. A 2 km branch to Sugamuta served the Kajima coal mine from 1904 until 1977.
- Kotake Station: the 8 km Kōbukuro Line to Futase opened in 1894 as a horse-drawn line servicing the Tetsuji mine. Steam locomotion was introduced in 1912, and passenger services in 1913. The line closed in 1969.

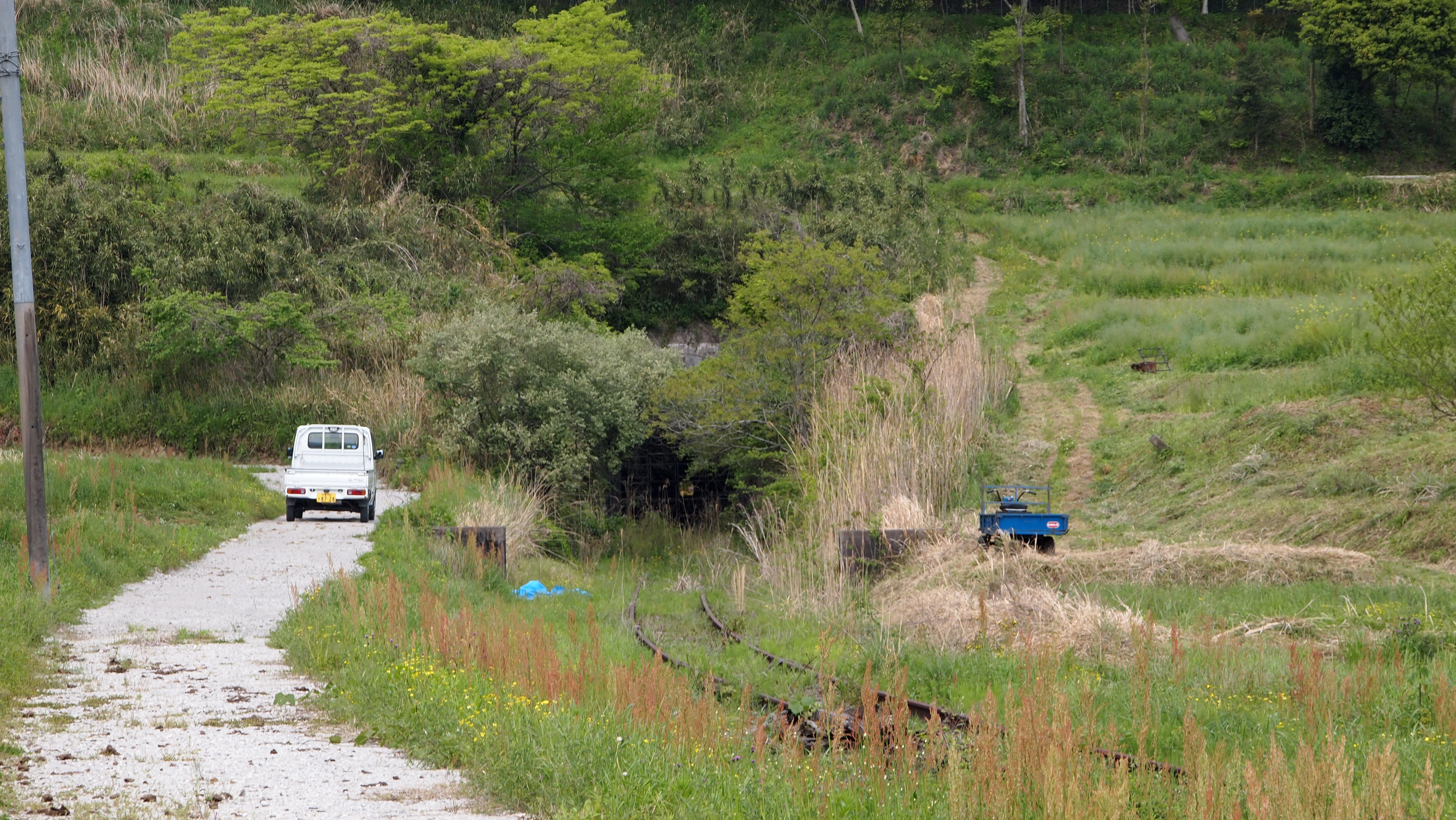
Kumagahata tunnel on the Kamiyamada line, 2013

- Iizuka Station: the 26 km Kamiyamada Line opened to Shimoyamada in 1898, extended to Kamiyamada in 1929, and to Buzenkawasaki (as a passenger-only section) in 1966. Freight services ceased in 1980, and the line closed in 1988. A 2 km 3 ft (914 mm) gauge line from Okuma - Okumamachi operated from 1924 until 1933.
