= Japan National Route 200 =

Road in Fukuoka prefecture, Japan

National Route 200
- 国道200号
- Japan National Route 200 highlighted in red
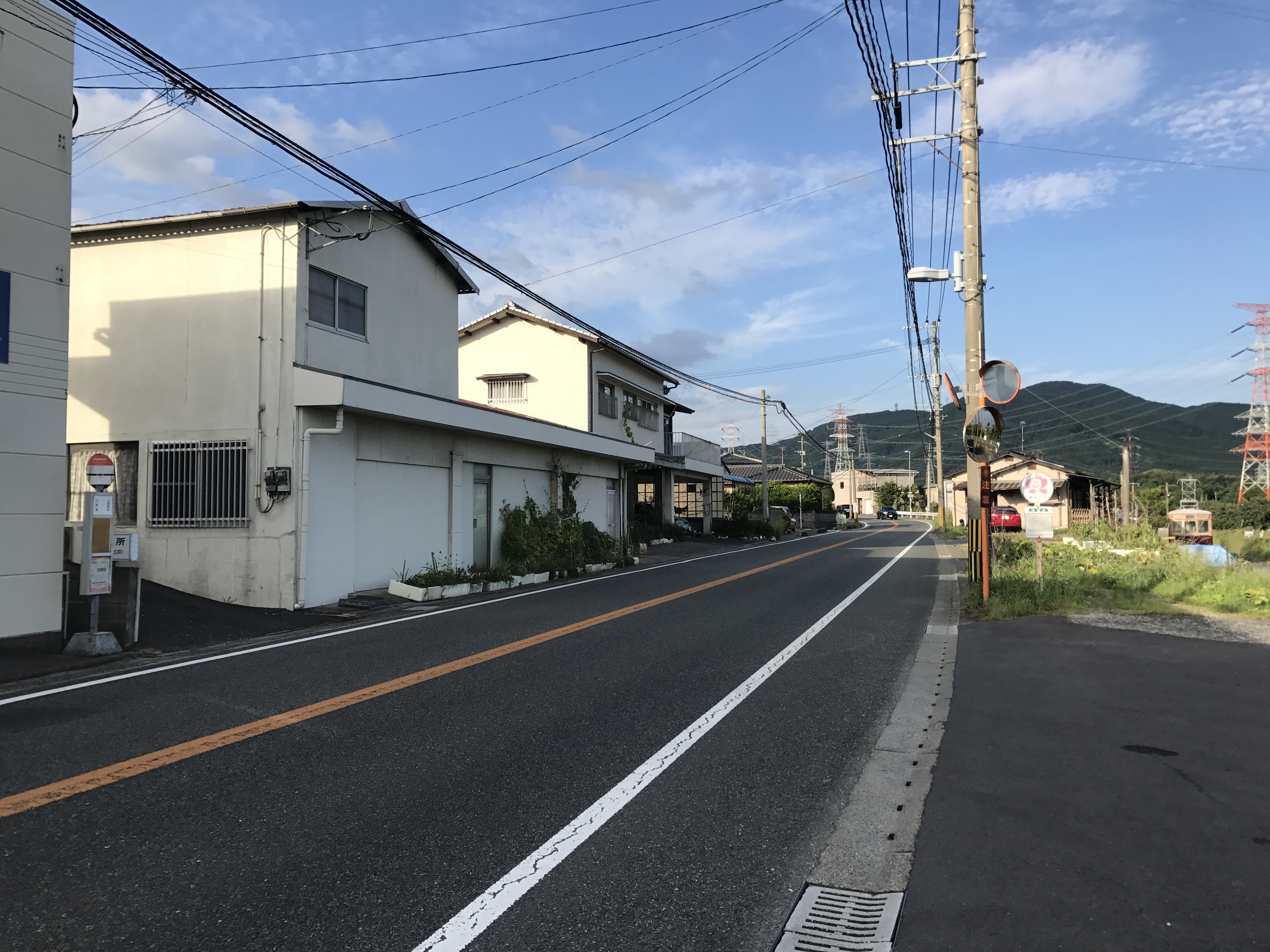

Route information
- Length: 91.2 km (56.7 mi)
- Existed: 18 May 1953–present

Major junctions
- North end: Yahatanishi-ku, Kitakyūshū
- South end: Chikushino, Fukuoka

Location
- Country: Japan

Highway system
- National highways of Japan; Expressways of Japan
| ← National Route 199 | → National Route 201 |

National Route 200 (国道200号, Kokudō Nihyaku-gō) is a national highway of Japan connecting Yahatanishi-ku, Kitakyūshū and Chikushino, Fukuoka, with a total length of 91.2 km (56.67 mi).

== History ==
National Route 200 was originally designated a second-class national highway on 18 May 1953, connecting the then-extant district of Chikushi (the former district is now part of the city, Chikushino) with Yahatanishi-ku, Kitakyūshū.
