= Orio Station =

Railway station in Kitakyushu, Japan

JA 19 JC 26 JE 01 Orio Station 折尾駅
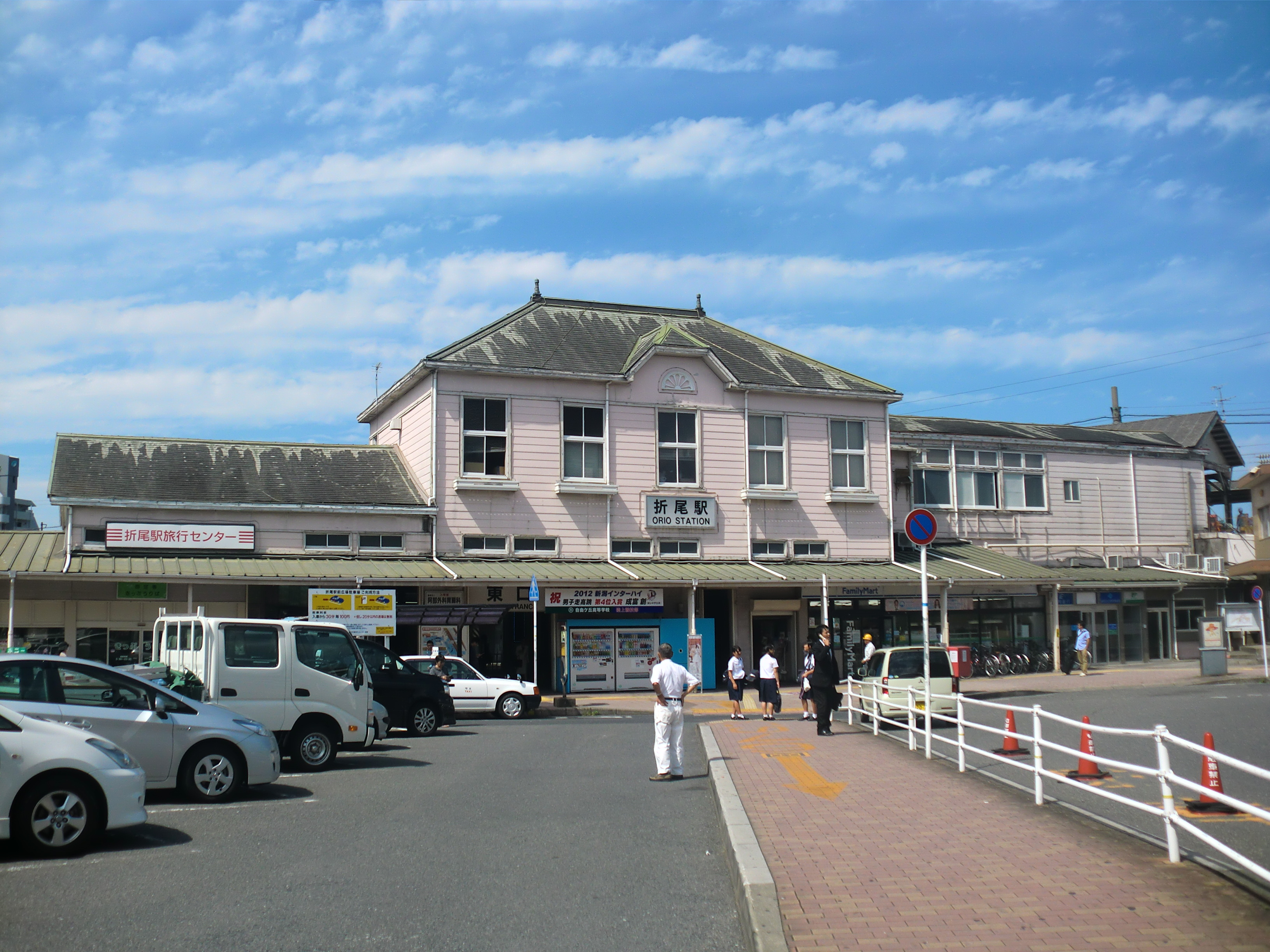
- Main station building, east side, September 2012

General information
- Location: 1-1 Horikawa-machi, Yahatanishi-ku, Kitakyūshū-shi, Fukuoka-ken; Japan
- Coordinates: 33°51′49″N 130°42′47″E
- Operator: JR Kyushu
- Lines: JA Kagoshima Main Line; JC Fukuhoku Yutaka Line (Chikuhō Main Line); JE Wakamatsu Line (Chikuhō Main Line)
- Distance: 30.1 km (18.7 mi) from Mojikō (Kagoshima Main Line); 10.8 km (6.7 mi) from Wakamatsu (Chikuhō Main Line)
- Platforms: 1 side platform and 3 island platforms
- Tracks: 7
- Connections: Bus terminal

Construction
- Structure type: Elevated (Kagoshima Main Line); At grade (Chikuhō Main Line)

Other information
- Station code: JA19; JC26; JE01
- Website: Official website

History
- Opened: 28 February 1891; 135 years ago

Passengers
- FY2021: 12,541 daily (boarding only)
- Rank: 5th (among JR Kyushu stations)

Services
Preceding station	JR Kyushu	Following station
Akama JA 14 towards Kagoshima	Kagoshima Main Line Rapid	Kurosaki JA 21 towards Mojikō
Ebitsu JA 16 towards Kagoshima	Kagoshima Main Line Rapid (Some trains only)	Kurosaki JA 21 towards Mojikō
Mizumaki JA 18 towards Kagoshima	Kagoshima Main Line Semi Rapid	Kurosaki JA 21 towards Mojikō
Mizumaki JA 18 towards Kagoshima	Kagoshima Main Line Local	Jinnoharu JA 20 towards Mojikō
Nakama JC 24 towards Kurosaki	Fukuhoku Yutaka Line Rapid	Terminus
Higashi-Mizumaki JC 25 towards Kurosaki	Fukuhoku Yutaka Line Local	Terminus
Higashi-Mizumaki JC 25 towards Kurosaki	Fukuhoku Yutaka Line Local	through to Wakamatsu Line (Chikuhō Main Line)
through to Fukuhoku Yutaka Line	Chikuhō Main Line (Wakamatsu Line) Local	Honjō JE 02 towards Wakamatsu
Location
- Location within Fukuoka Prefecture Location within Kyushu Location within Japan

Orio Station (折尾駅, Orio-eki) is a junction passenger railway station located in Yahatanishi-ku, Kitakyushu, Japan, operated by the JR Kyushu.

== Lines ==
Orio Station is served by the Kagoshima Main Line and Chikuhō Main Line. It is located 30.1 km from the start of the Kagoshima Main Line at Mojikō and 10.8 kilometers from Kurosaki on the Fukuhoku Yutaka Line and Wakamatsu Line portions of the Chikuhō Main Line.

== Station layout ==
The two lines serving the station intersect at Orio, and the lines are connected by a spur track. The station therefore consists of two separated blocks: the main building with bi-level platforms at the crossing point, and detached platforms on the spur. The station has a total of three island platforms and one side platform, connected by an elevated station building. The station has a "Midori no Madoguchi" staffed ticket office.

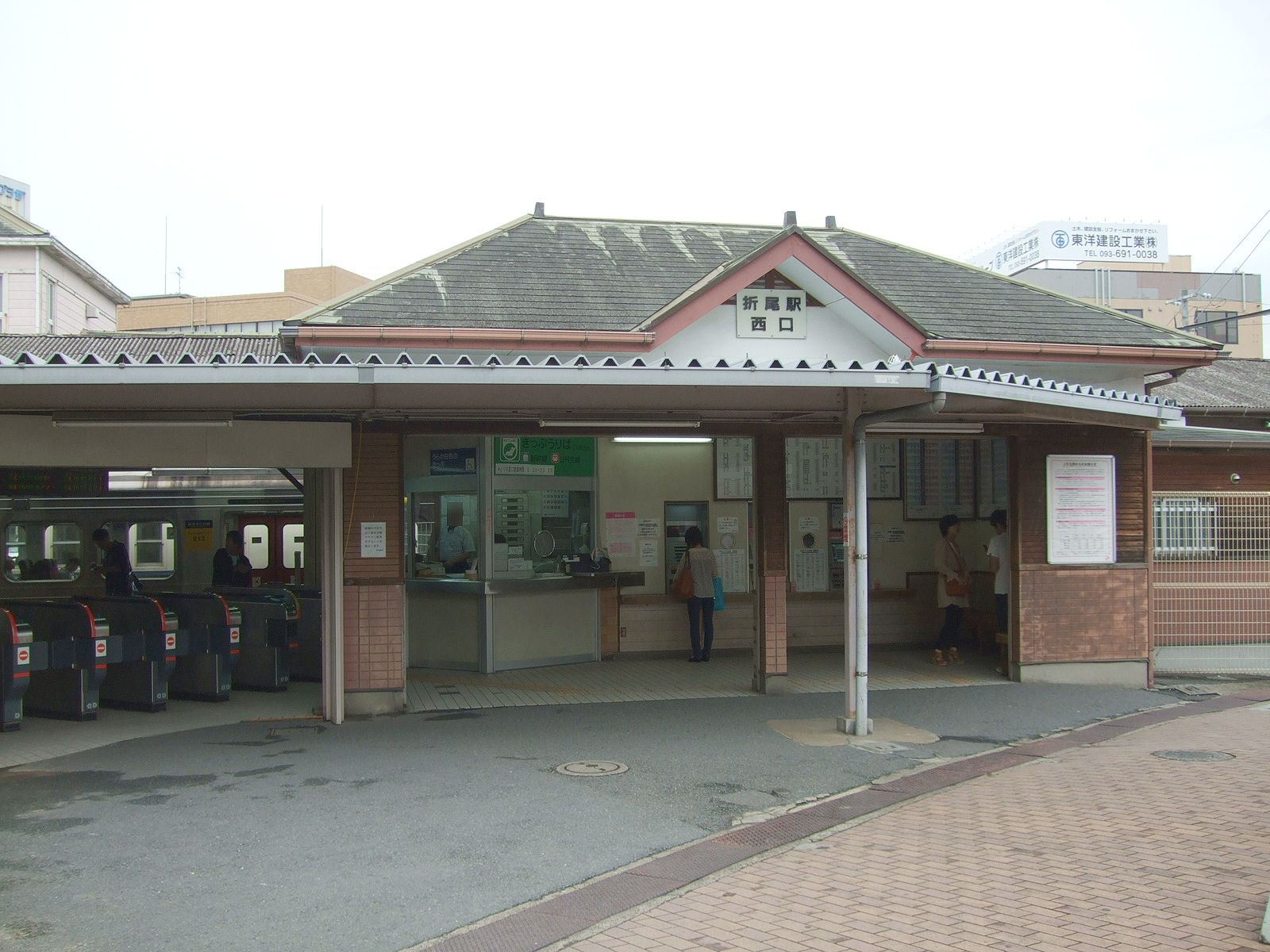
West entrance, June 2011

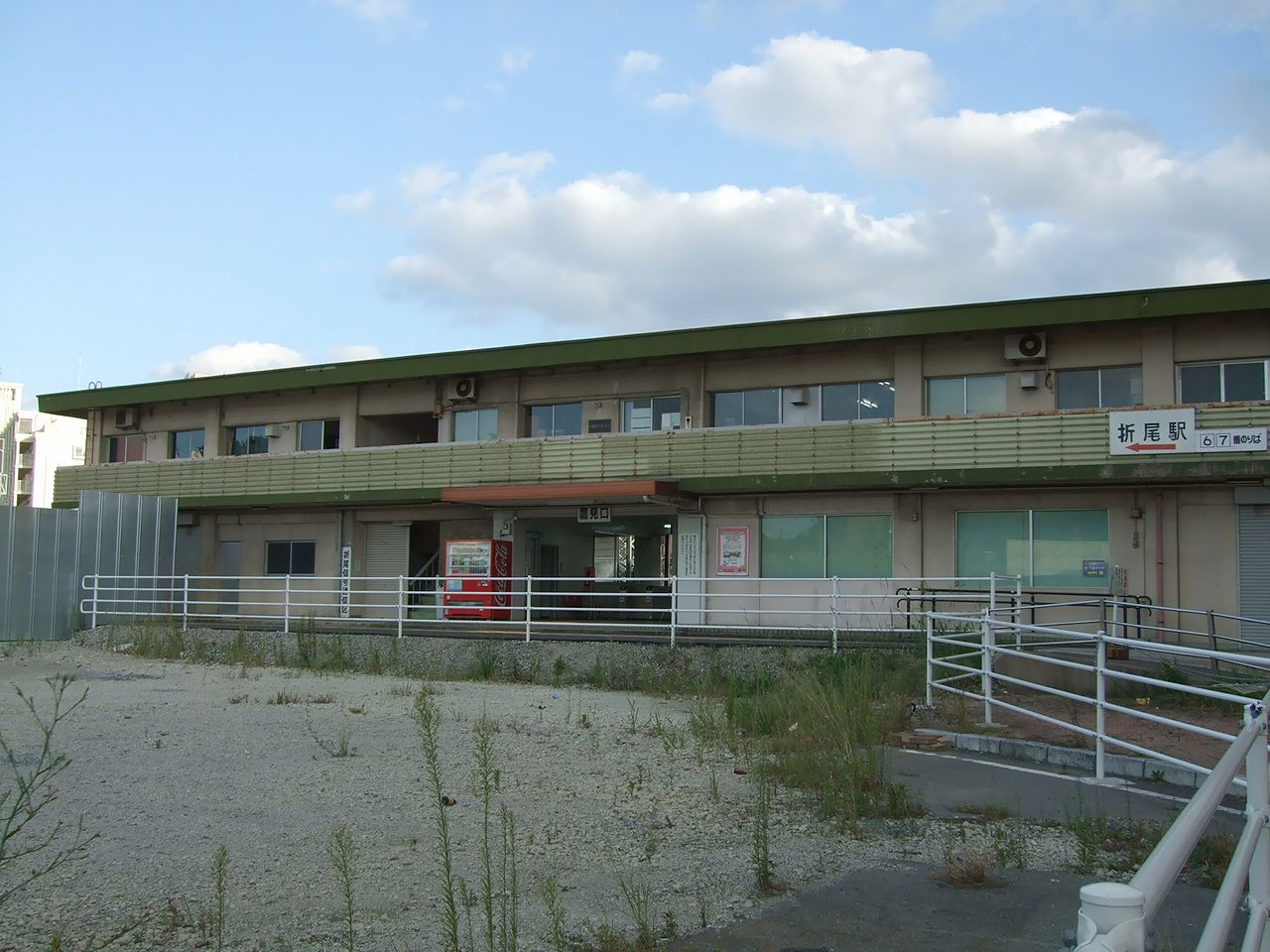
Takami entrance, October 2009

=== Platforms ===
==== Main building lower level ====
1	■ Wakamatsu Line (Chikuhō Main Line)	for Futajima and Wakamatsu
2	■ Fukuhoku Yutaka Line (Chikuhō Main Line)	for Nakama, Nōgata, Iizuka, and Sasaguri

==== Main building upper level ====
3	■ Kagoshima Main Line	for Akama, Hakata, Tosu, Kurume, Ōmuta, and Kumamoto
4	■ Kagoshima Main Line	Local trains running either direction, which allow for limited express trains to pass through this station, and local shuttle trains running between this station and Kokura and/or Mojikō
5	■ Kagoshima Main Line	for Kurosaki, Yahata, Space World, Kokura, Mojikō, and Ōita

Limited express trains, including the Sonic, stop here.

==== Spur track (Takami entrance) ====
6	■ Kagoshima Main Line	for Kurosaki and Kokura
7	■ Fukuhoku-yutaka Line (Chikuhō Main Line)	for Nakama, Nōgata, Iizuka, and Sasaguri

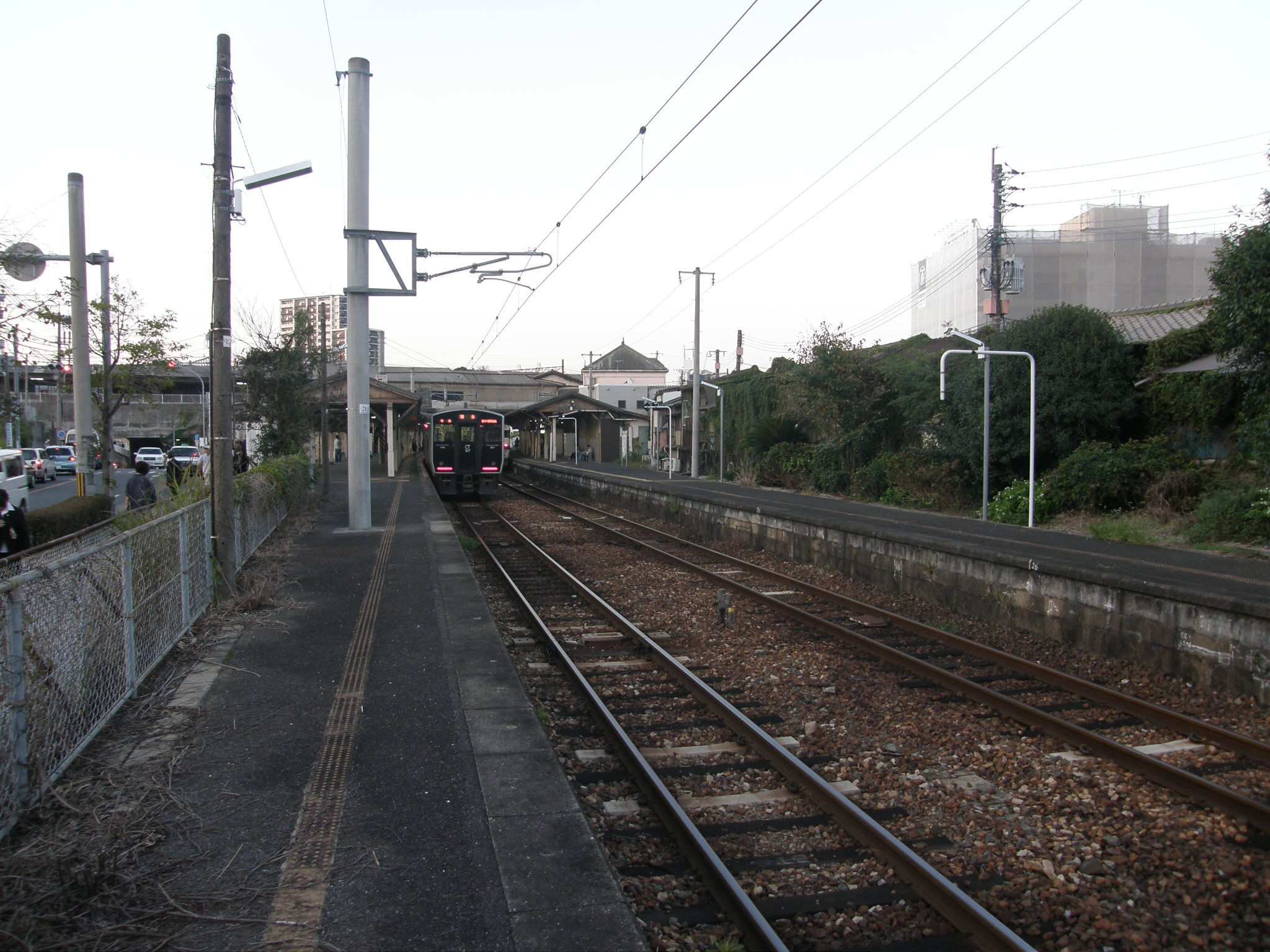
Lower-level platforms 1 and 2, October 2011

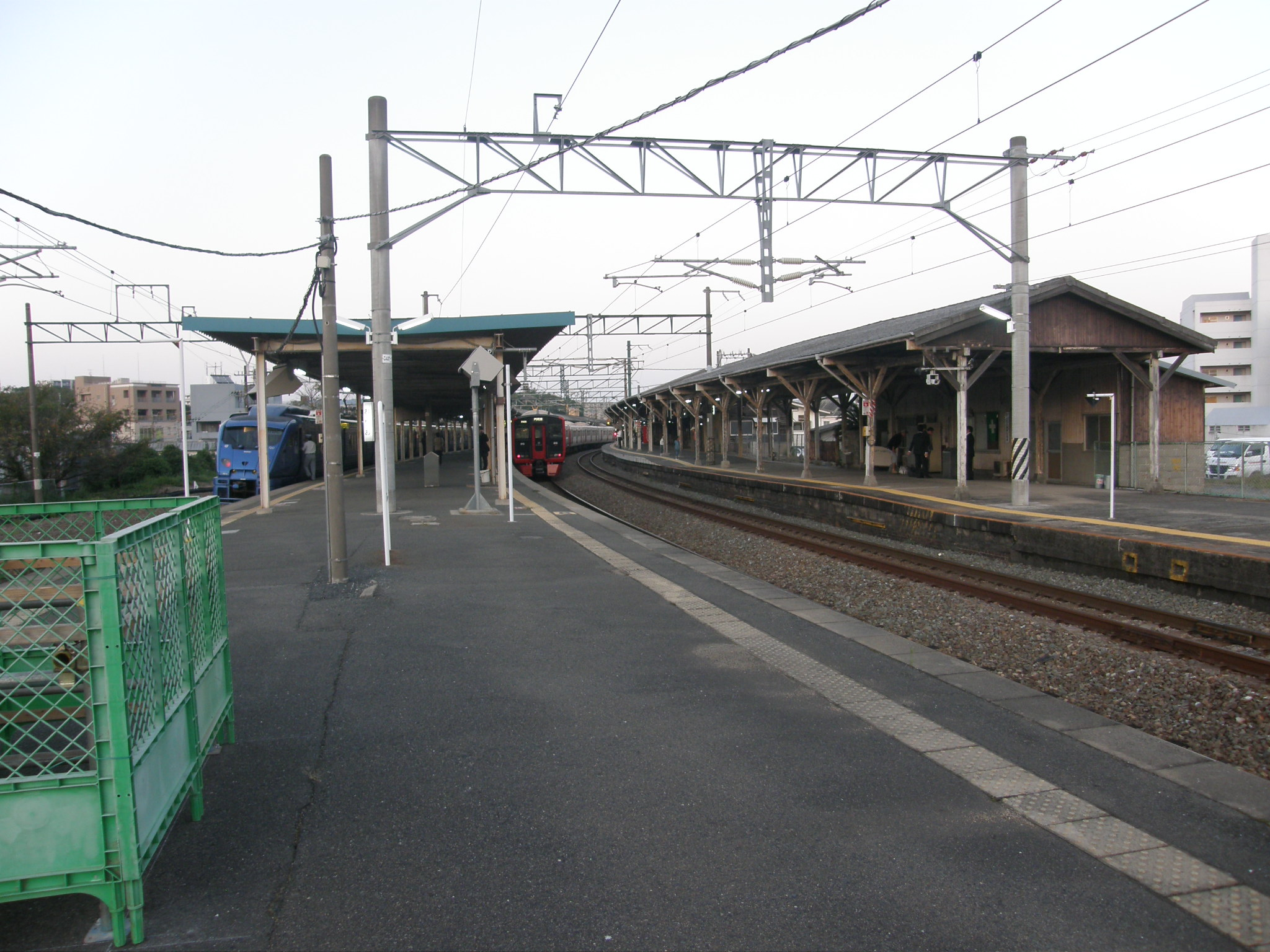
Upper-level platforms 3 to 5, October 2011

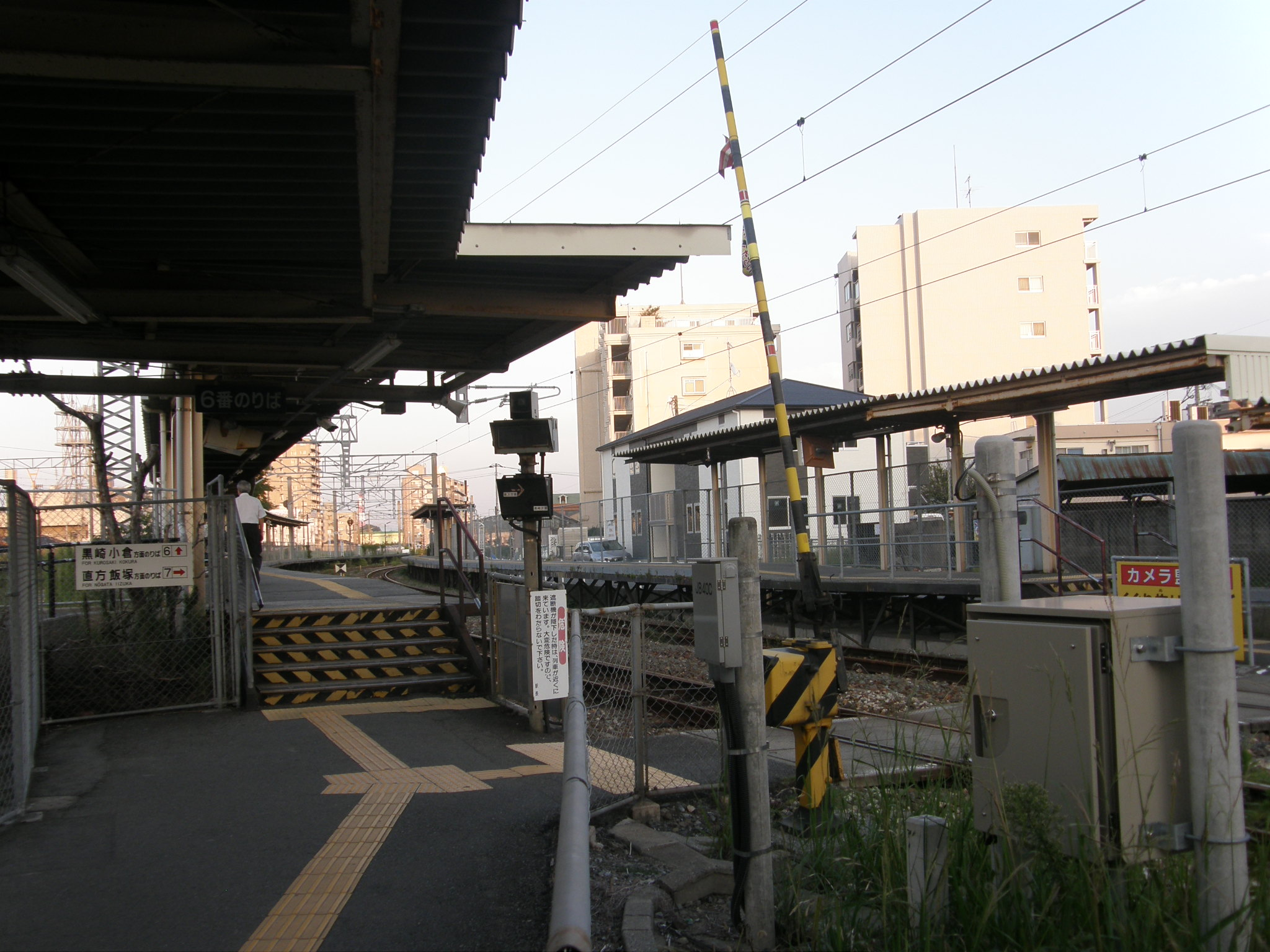
Platforms 6 and 7, October 2011

== History ==
The privately run Kyushu Railway had begun laying down its network on Kyushu in 1889 and by the end of 1890 had a stretch of track from Ongagawa southwards to Kurume. The track was extended northwards from Ongagawa to Kurosaki by 28 February 1891, with Orio being opened on the same day as one of the intermediate stations. On 30 August 1891, Orio also became an intermediate station for the Chikuho Kogyo Railway (later renamed the Chikuho Railway) when it laid a track from Wakamatsu to Nōgata. The Chikuho Railway merged with the Kyushu Railway on 1 October 1897. When the Kyushu Railway was nationalized on 1 July 1907, Japanese Government Railways (JGR) took over control of the station. On 12 October 1909, the station became part of the Hitoyoshi Main Line and then on 21 November 1909, part of the Kagoshima Main Line. With the privatization of Japanese National Railways (JNR), the successor of JGR, on 1 April 1987, JR Kyushu took over control of the station.

The station building was rebuilt in 1916, but use of this building was discontinued from 6 October 2012 in preparation for rebuilding work, with operations shifted to a temporary structure. The station building was scheduled to be demolished during 2012, with the new structure completed in fiscal 2016.

== Passenger statistics ==
In fiscal 2020, the station was used by an average of 11,306 passengers daily (boarding passengers only), and it ranked 7th among the busiest stations of JR Kyushu.

== Surrounding area ==
- Orio Police Station
- National Route 3
- National Route 199

=== Educational facilities ===
- Kyushu Kyoritsu University
- Kyushu Women's University
- University of Occupational and Environmental Health Japan
- Kyushu Women's Junior College
- Orio Aishin Junior College
- Fukuoka Prefectural Tochiku High School
- Fukuoka Prefectural Orio High School
- Jiyugaoka High School

== Buses ==
Airport buses leave from a bus stop located at the west exit of the main building to the Kitakyushu Airport. Also, there is a Kitakyushu municipal bus terminal for local buses connecting vicinities including Wakamatsu and Ashiya in front of the east exit of main building.

== See also ==
- List of railway stations in Japan
- Orio (Kitakyushu)
