= Wakamatsu Station =

Railway station in Kitakyushu, Japan

Coordinates: 33.901217°N 130.806332°E

JE 06 Wakamatsu Station 若松駅
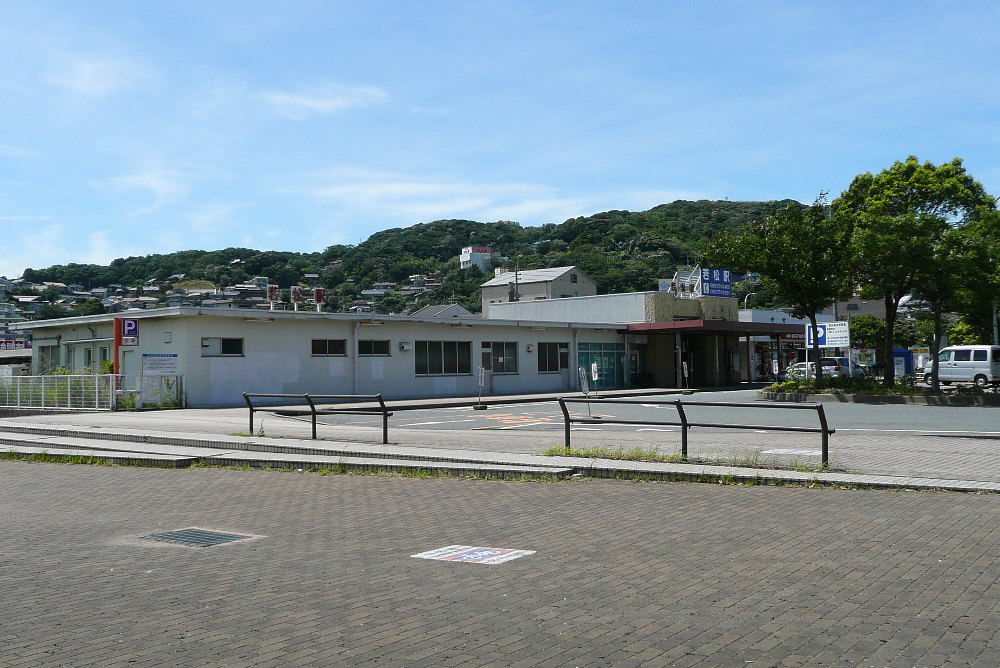

General information
- Location: 1-18-1 Hakusan, Wakamatsu Ward, Kitakyushu City, Fukuoka Prefecture; Japan
- Operator: JR Kyushu
- Line: JE Wakamatsu Line (Chikuhō Main Line)
- Platforms: 1 bay island platform
- Tracks: 2
- Connections: Bus stop

Construction
- Structure type: At grade

Other information
- Station code: JE06

History
- Opened: 30 August 1891; 134 years ago

Passengers
- FY2018: 1,208 daily (boarding only)
- Rank: 131st (among JR Kyushu stations)

Services
Preceding station	JR Kyushu	Following station
Fujinoki JE 05 towards Orio	Chikuhō Main Line (Wakamatsu Line) Local	Terminus
Location
- Location within Fukuoka Prefecture Location within Kyushu Location within Japan

Wakamatsu Station (若松駅, Wakamatsu-eki) is a railway station on the Kyūshū Railway Company (JR Kyūshū) Chikuhō Main Line (also known as the Wakamatsu Line) located in Wakamatsu-ku, Kitakyushu, Fukuoka Prefecture, Japan.

== Station layout ==
There is a single island platform currently served by one track.

1	■ Wakamatsu Line (Chikuhō Main Line)	for Orio, Nakama, and Nōgata

== History ==
The station was opened on 30 August 1891 by the privately run Chikuho Kogyo Railway as the northern terminus of a stretch of track which it had laid to Nōgata. On 1 October 1897, the company, now renamed the Chikuho Railway, merged with the Kyushu Railway. After the Kyushu Railway was nationalized on 1 July 1907, Japanese Government Railways (JGR) took over control of the station. On 12 October 1909, the station became part of the Chikuho Main Lines. With the privatization of Japanese National Railways (JNR), the successor of JGR, on 1 April 1987, control of the station passed to JR Kyushu.

== Passenger statistics ==
In fiscal 2016, the station was used by an average of 1,342 passengers daily (boarding passengers only), and it ranked 131st among the busiest stations of JR Kyushu.

== Surrounding area ==
Wakamatsu Station is the easternmost station on the Chikuhō Main Line and lies about 500 meters southwest of the Wakato Bridge. The surrounding area, once home to a freight yard, has seen the development of new residential condominiums in recent years. National Route 199 is immediately northwest of the station.

The nearest city bus stop is located northeast of the station along National Route 495.
