= Chikuzen-Shōnai Station =

Railway station in Iizuka, Fukuoka Prefecture, Japan

JJ 04 Chikuzen-Shōnai Station 筑前庄内駅
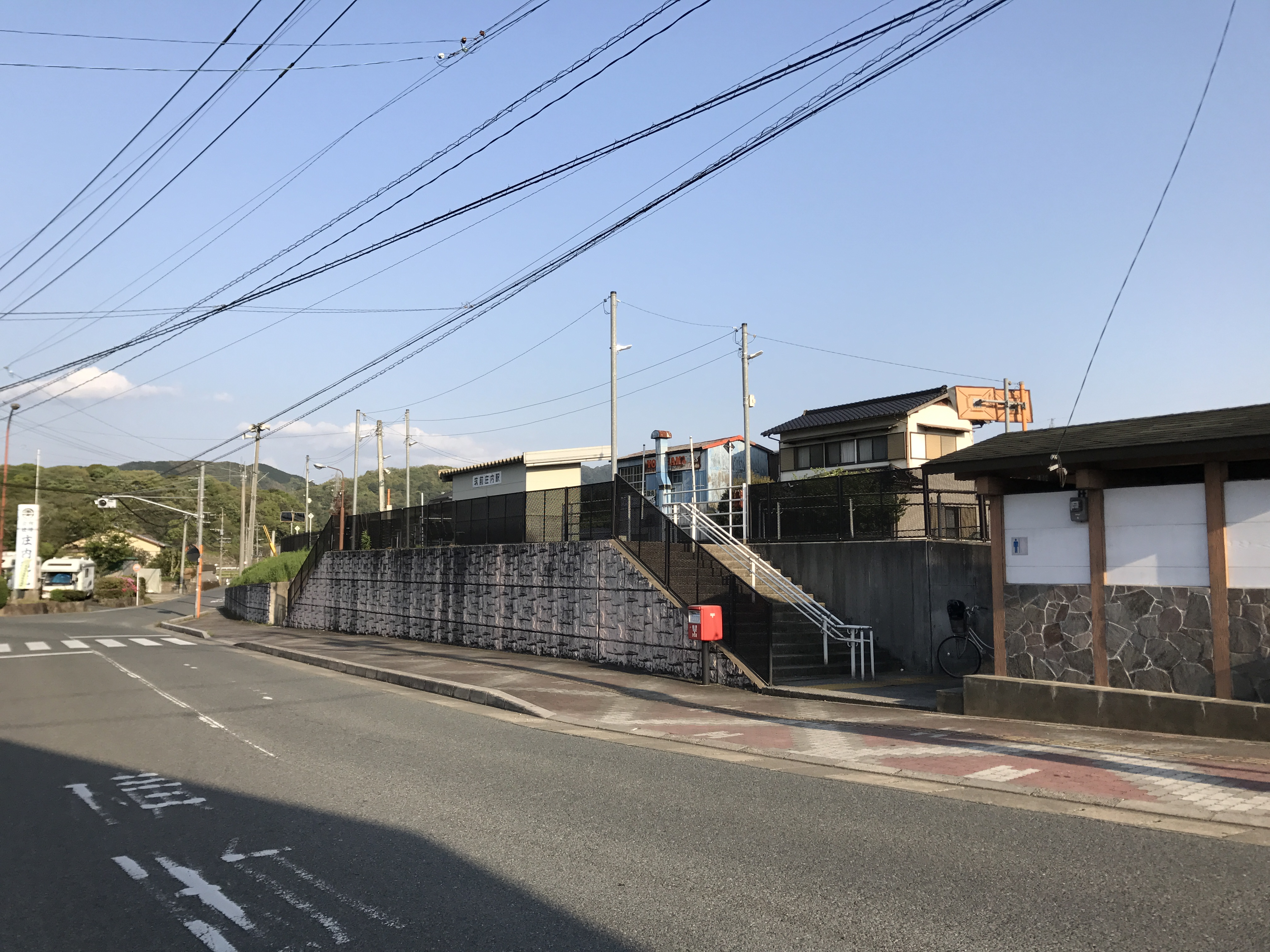
- Chikuzen-Shōnai Station in April 2017

General information
- Location: 786 Akasaka, Iizuka-shi, Fukuoka-ken 820-0106; Japan
- Coordinates: 33°36′59.43″N 130°44′18.31″E
- Operator: JR Kyushu
- Line: JJ Gotōji Line
- Distance: 7.1 km from Tagawa-Gotōji
- Platforms: 1 side platform

Other information
- Station code: JJ04
- Website: Official website

History
- Opened: 15 July 1926

Services
Preceding station	JR Kyushu	Following station
Funao towards Tagawa-Gotōji	Gotōji Line	Shimo-Kamoo towards Shin-Iizuka
Location
- Location within Fukuoka Prefecture Location within Japan

Chikuzen-Shōnai Station (筑前庄内駅, Chikuzen-Shōnai-eki) is a passenger railway station located in the city of Iizuka, Fukuoka, Japan. It is operated by Kyushu Railway Company (JR Kyushu).

== Lines ==
Chikuzen-Shōnai Station is served by the Gotōji Line and is 7.1 kilometers from the terminus of the line at Tagawa-Gotōji.

== Layout ==
The station consists of one side platform serving a single bi-directional track. The station is unattended.

== History ==
The station was opened on 15 July 1926 as a station on the Kyushu Sangyo Railway (later Sangyo Cement Railway). On 1 July 1943 the Industrial Cement Railway was nationalized through a wartime acquisition and the station became part of the Gotōji Line. With the privatization of the JNR on 1 April 1987, the station came under the control of JR Kyushu.

== Surrounding area ==
The station was the only railway station in Shonai Town when it merged with Iizuka City, but it is approximately 3 kilometers south of the center of the former Shonai Town. The surrounding area is a residential area.

== See also ==
- List of railway stations in Japan
