= Kami-Mio Station =

Railway station in Iizuka, Fukuoka Prefecture, Japan

JJ 02 Kami-Mio Station 上三緒駅
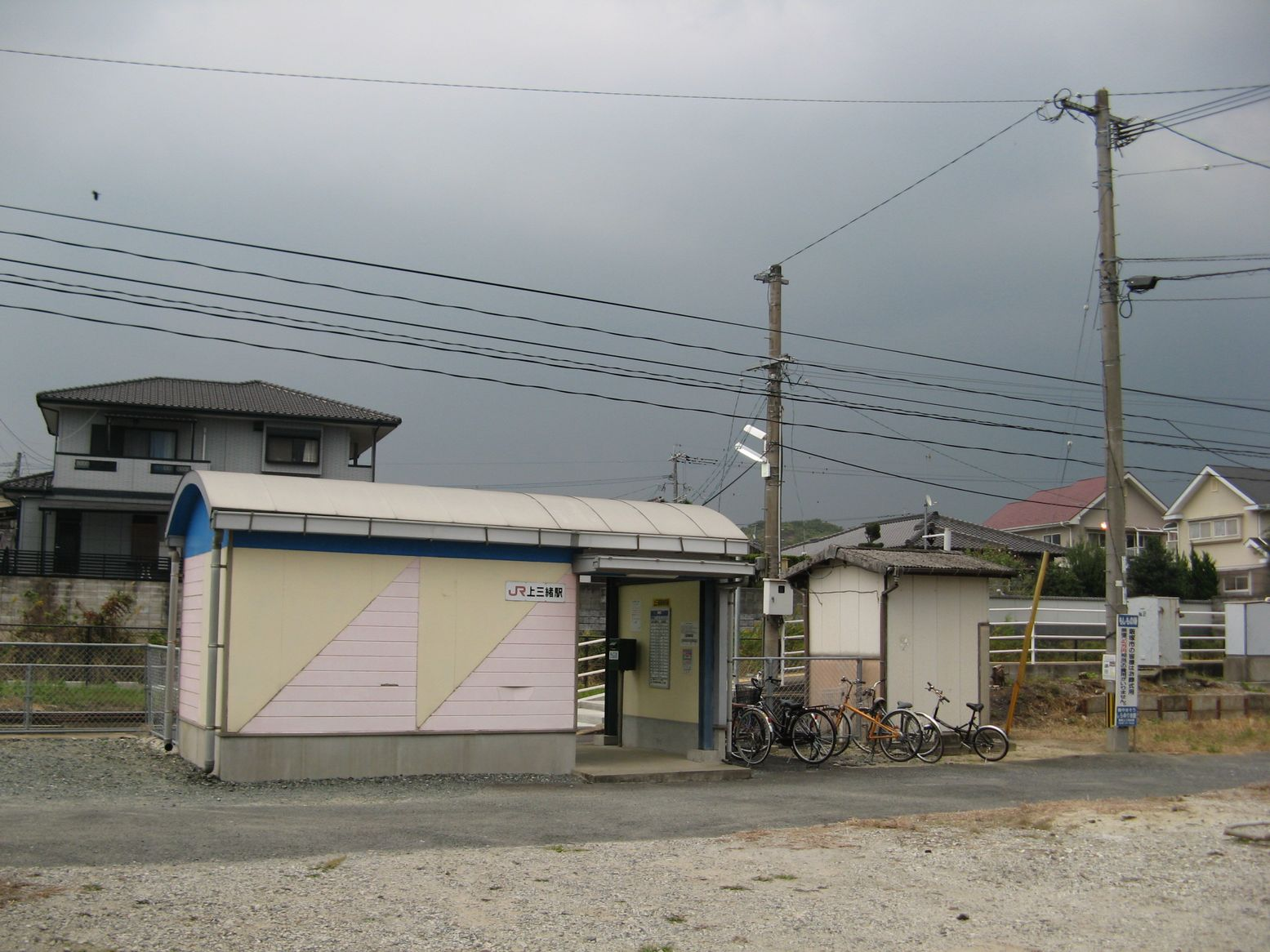
- Kami-Mio Station in November 2007

General information
- Location: 325 Kamimio, Iizuka-shi, Fukuoka-ken 820-0013; Japan
- Coordinates: 33°37′22.74″N 130°42′48.33″E
- Operator: JR Kyushu
- Line: JJ Gotōji Line
- Distance: 10.2 km from Tagawa-Gotōji
- Platforms: 1 side platform

Other information
- Station code: JJ02
- Website: Official website

History
- Opened: 15 June 1902

Services
Preceding station	JR Kyushu	Following station
Shimo-Kamoo towards Tagawa-Gotōji	Gotōji Line	Shin-Iizuka Terminus
Location
- Location within Fukuoka Prefecture Location within Japan

Kami-Mio Station (上三緒駅, Kami-Mio-eki) is a passenger railway station located in the city of Iizuka, Fukuoka, Japan. It is operated by Kyushu Railway Company (JR Kyushu).

== Lines ==
Kami-Mio Station is served by the Gotōji Line and is 10.2 kilometers from the terminus of the line at Tagawa-Gotōji.

== Layout ==
The station consists of one side platform serving a single bi-directional track. The simple station building that looks like a caboose is installed next to the platform. The station is unattended.

== History ==
The station was opened on 15 June 1902 as a freight station on the Kyushu Railway. The railway was nationalized in 1907, and the line became the Chikuho Main Line (freight branch line) in 1909. Passenger service commenced on 10 May 1920, and on the same day, the line was renamed the Urushi Line. On July 1, 1943, the Industrial Cement Railway was nationalized through a wartime acquisition and the station became part of the Gotōji Line. With the privatization of the JNR on 1 April 1987, the station came under the control of JR Kyushu.

== Surrounding area ==
- Iizuka-Shonai Tagawa Bypass (Japan National Route 201)

== See also ==
- List of railway stations in Japan
