= Funao Station (Fukuoka) =

Railway station in Tagawa, Fukuoka Prefecture, Japan

JJ 05 Funao Station 船尾駅
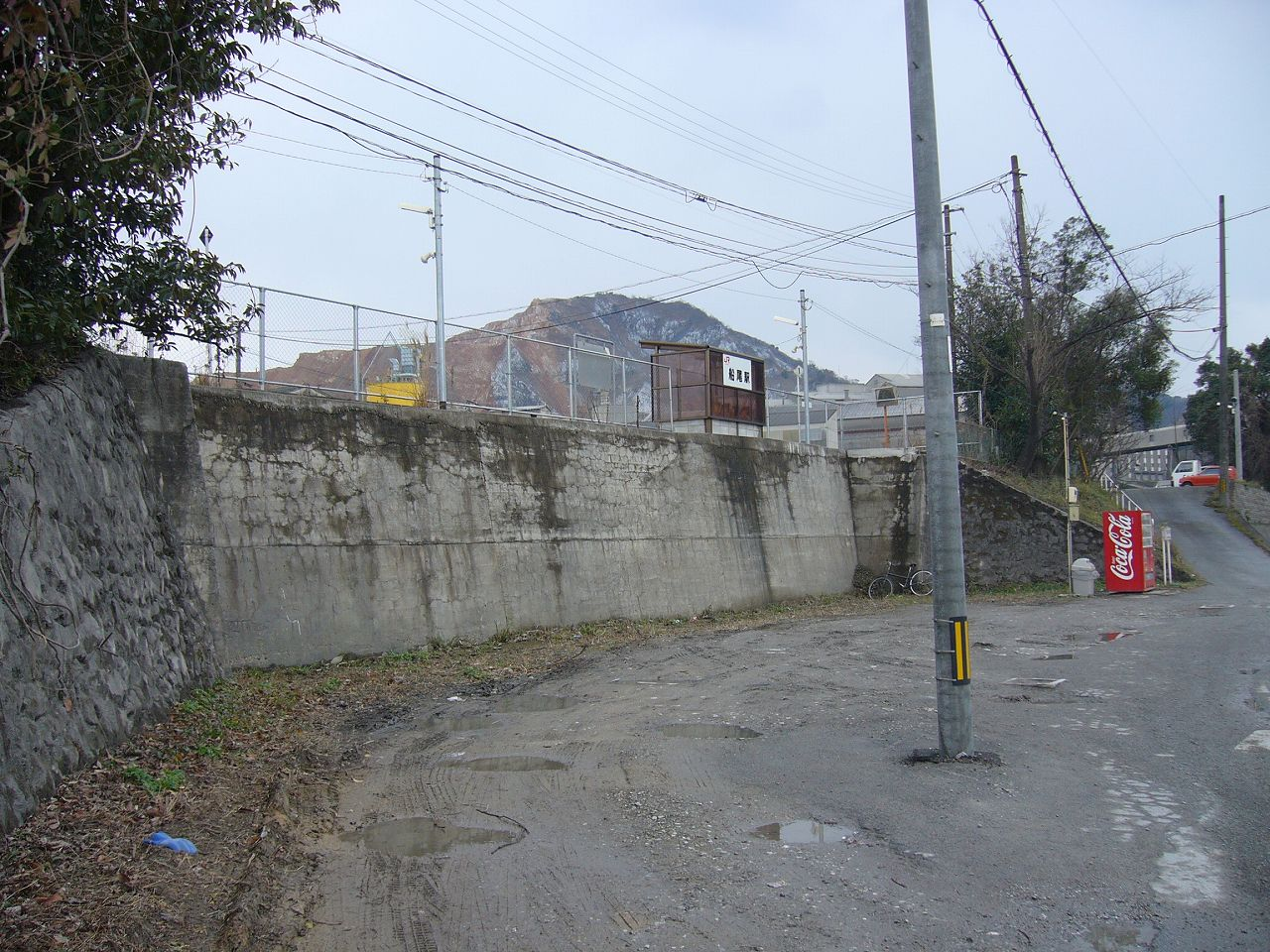
- Funao Station in September 2007

General information
- Location: Yugeta, Tagawa-shi, Fukuoka-ken 826-0041; Japan
- Coordinates: 33°37′49.61″N 130°46′2.56″E
- Operator: JR Kyushu
- Line: JJ Gotōji Line
- Distance: 3.4 km from Tagawa-Gotōji
- Platforms: 1 side platform

Other information
- Station code: JJ05
- Website: Official website

History
- Opened: 5 February 1922

Services
Preceding station	JR Kyushu	Following station
Tagawa-Gotōji Terminus	Gotōji Line	Chikuzen-Shōnai towards Shin-Iizuka
Location
- Location within Fukuoka Prefecture Location within Japan

Funao Station (船尾駅, Funao-eki) is a passenger railway station located in the city of Tagawa, Fukuoka, Japan. It is operated by Kyushu Railway Company (JR Kyushu).

== Lines ==
Funao Station is served by the Gotōji Line and is 3.4 kilometers from the terminus of the line at Tagawa-Gotōji.

== Layout ==
The station consists of one side platform serving a single bi-directional track. The station is unattended.

== History ==
The station was opened on 5 February 1922 as a freight station on the Kyushu Sangyo Railway (later Sangyo Cement Railway). The line was extended on July 15, 1926 to the Akasaka Coal Mine, and passenger services began. On July 1, 1943 the Industrial Cement Railway was nationalized through a wartime acquisition and the station became part of the Gotōji Line. With the privatization of the JNR on 1 April 1987, the station came under the control of JR Kyushu.

== Surrounding area ==
The limestone mine and Aso Cement factory located around this station are still in operation, and most of the area around the station is mine or factory site, with no residences or shops.

== See also ==
- List of railway stations in Japan
