= Namazuta Station =

Railway station in Iizuka, Fukuoka Prefecture, Japan

JC 16 Namazuta Station 鯰田駅
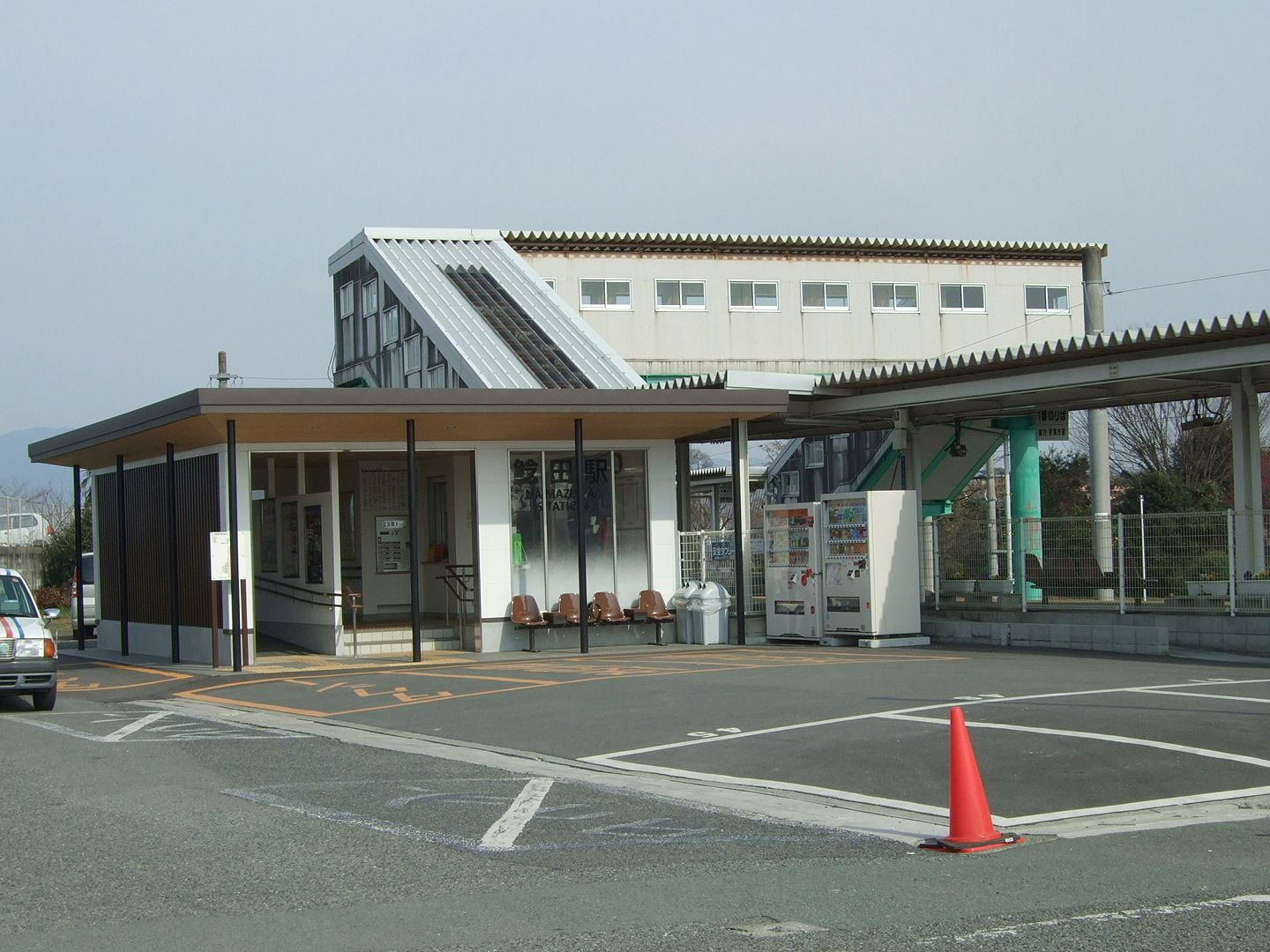
- Namazuta Station in 2014

General information
- Location: 809 Namazuta, Iizuka-shi, Fukuoka-ken 820-0001; Japan
- Coordinates: 33°40′08″N 130°42′07″E
- Operator: JR Kyushu
- Line: JC Chikuhō Main Line
- Distance: 34.7 km from Wakamatsu
- Platforms: 2 side platforms
- Tracks: 2

Construction
- Structure type: At grade
- Parking: Available
- Cycle facilities: Bike shed

Other information
- Status: Unstaffed
- Website: Official website

History
- Opened: 13 August 1891

Passengers
- FY2021: 279 daily
- Rank: 285th (among JR Kyushu stations)

Services
Preceding station	JR Kyushu	Following station
Urata towards Haruda	Chikuhō Main Line Local	Kotake towards Wakamatsu
Location
- Location within Fukuoka Prefecture Location within Japan

Namazuta Station (鯰田駅, Namazuta-eki) is a passenger railway station located in the city of Iizuka, Fukuoka Prefecture, Japan. It is operated by JR Kyushu.

== Lines ==
The station is served by the Chikuhō Main Line and is located 34.7 km from the starting point of the line at Wakamatsu.

== Station layout ==
The station, which is unstaffed, consists of two staggered side platforms serving two tracks. A station building of modern concrete design houses a waiting room and an automatic ticket vending machine. There is a ramp up to the station building entrance from the access road but access to the opposite side platform is by means of a sheltered footbridge. A bike shed and parking lots for cars are provided outside the station.

=== Platforms ===
1	■ JC Chikuhō Main Line	for Nōgata and Orio
2	■ JC Chikuhō Main Line	for Shin-Iizuka and Hakata

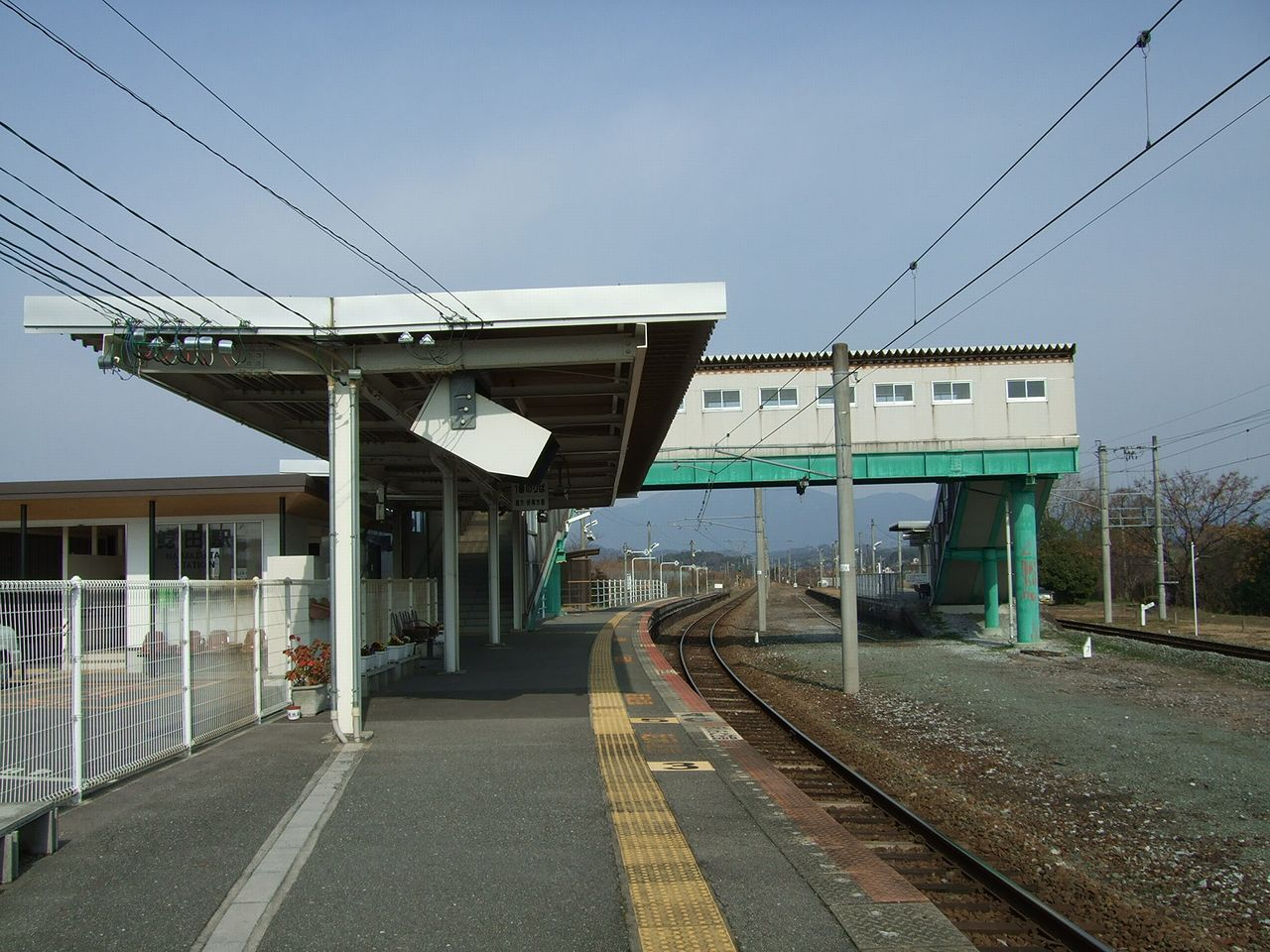
A view of the station platforms and tracks.

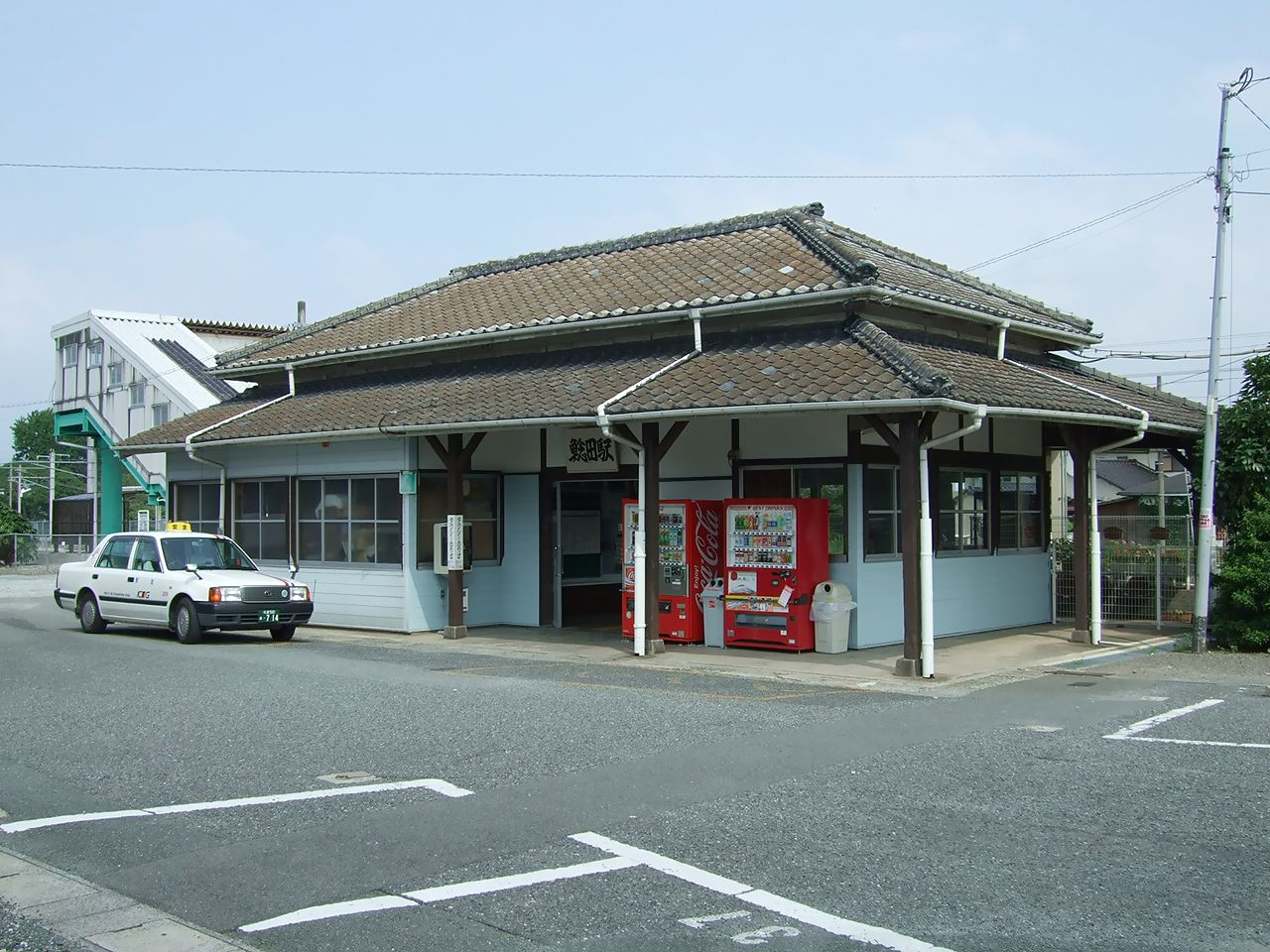
The old station building, as seen in 2009.

== History ==
The privately run Chikuho Kogyo Railway had opened a track from Wakamatsu to Nōgata on 30 August 1891 and by 28 October 1892, this had been extended southwards to Kotake. In the next phase of expansion, the track was further extended, with Iizuka becoming new southern terminus on 3 July 1893. On the same day, Namazuta was opened as an intermediate station on this new stretch of track. On 1 October 1897, the Chikuho Kogyo Railway, now renamed the Chikuho Railway, merged with the Kyushu Railway. After the Kyushu Railway was nationalized on 1 July 1907, Japanese Government Railways (JGR) took over control of the station. On 12 October 1909, the station became part of the Chikuho Main Line. With the privatization of Japanese National Railways (JNR), the successor of JGR, on 1 April 1987, control of the station passed to JR Kyushu.

== Passenger statistics ==
In fiscal 2021, the station was used by a daily average of 279 boarding passengers, making it the 285th busiest station on the JR Kyushu network.。

== Surrounding area ==
The station is located in the northern part of Iizuka City. The Onga River runs parallel to the Chikuho Main Line in front of the station, and Japan National Route 200 runs across the river. Behind the station are the city hall branch, elementary school, and post office, as well as many residential buildings.

- Iizuka City Hall Nazuta Branch Office
- Namazuta Honmachi Community Center
- Iizuka City Namazuta Elementary School

== See also ==
- List of railway stations in Japan
