= Ishiharamachi Station =

Railway station in Kitakyushu, Japan

JI 08 Ishiharamachi Station 石原町駅
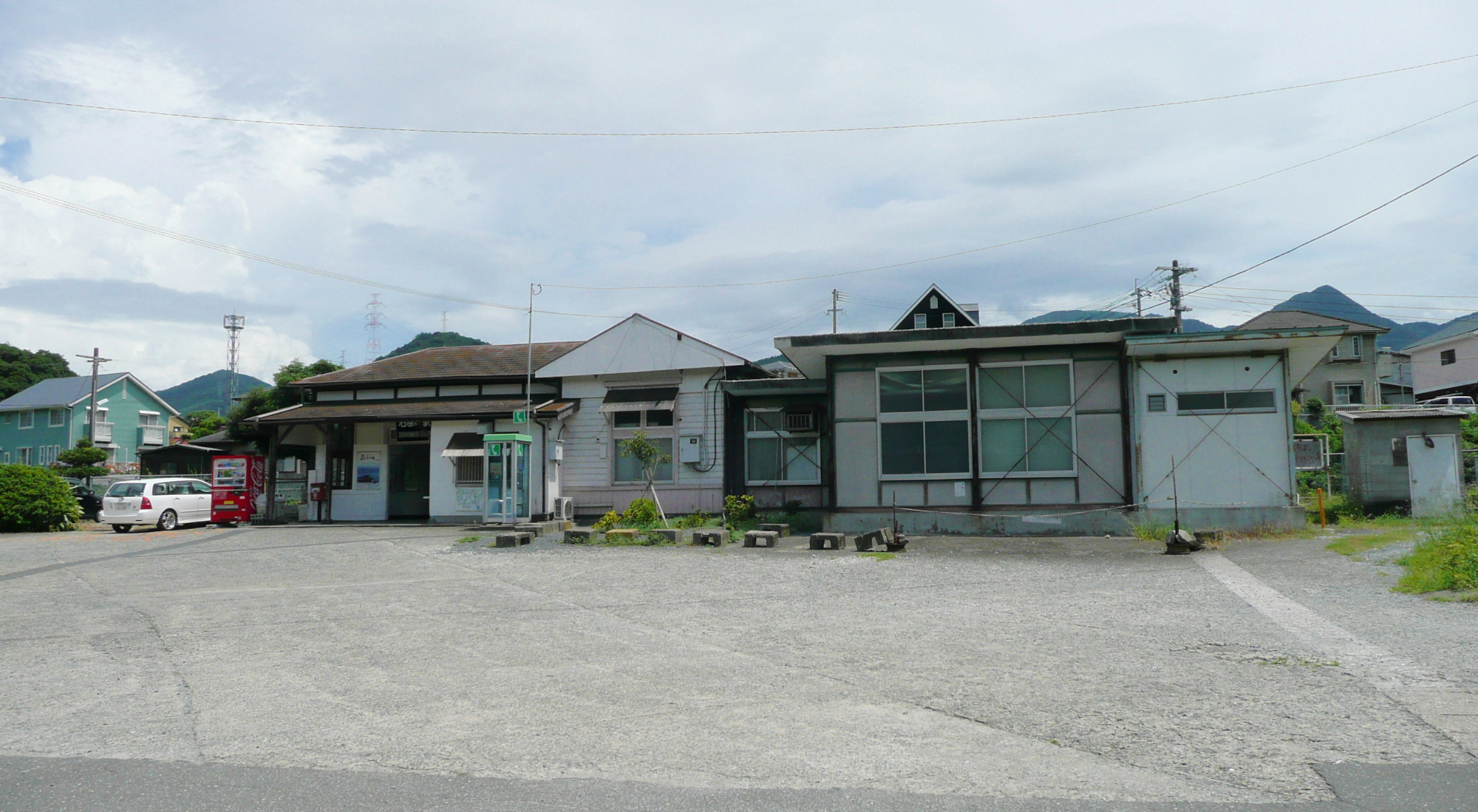
- Ishiharamachi Station in August 2008

General information
- Location: 372-2 Shindoji, Kokuraminami-ku, Kitakyushu-shi, Fukuoka-ken 803-0186; Japan
- Coordinates: 33°47′06″N 130°51′57″E
- Operator: JR Kyushu
- Line: JI Hitahikosan Line
- Distance: 9.0 km from Jōno
- Platforms: 1 side + 1 island platform
- Tracks: 2

Other information
- Status: Unstaffed
- Station code: JI08
- Website: Official website

History
- Opened: 1 April 1915
- Former names: Ishiwaramachi (to 1943)

Passengers
- FY2016: 190

Services
Preceding station	JR Kyushu	Following station
Yobuno towards Yoake	Hitahikosan Line	Shii towards Kokura
Location
- Location within Fukuoka Prefecture Location within Japan

Ishiharamachi Station (石原町駅, Ishiharamachi-eki) is a passenger railway station located in Kokuraminami-ku, Kitakyūshū, Fukuoka Prefecture, Japan. It is operated by JR Kyushu.

== Lines ==
The station is served by the Hitahikosan Line and is located 9.0 km from the starting point of the line at Jōno. One train per hour stops at the station during the daytime, increased to two per hour during the morning and evening peaks.

== Layout ==
The station consists of one side platform and one island platform connected by a level crossing; however, one platform (Track 2) is not in use. The station building is on the side of the side platform and dates from the foundation of the station. The station is unattended.

=== Platforms ===
1	■ JI Hitahikosan Line	for Jōno and Kokura
2	■ JI Hitahikosan Line	not in service
3	■ JI Hitahikosan Line	for Tagawa-Gotōji and Soeda

== History ==
The station opened on 1 April 1915 as a station on the Kokura Railway. The railway was nationalized in 1943. On 1 April 1987, with the privatisation of the JNR, the station came under the control of JR Kyushu.

== Surrounding area ==
- Hiraodai Nature Observation Center
- Kitakyushu City Shindoji Elementary School
- Kitakyushu City Higashitani Junior High School
- Japan National Route 322

== See also ==
- List of railway stations in Japan
