= Iizuka =

Iizuka 飯塚市
- City
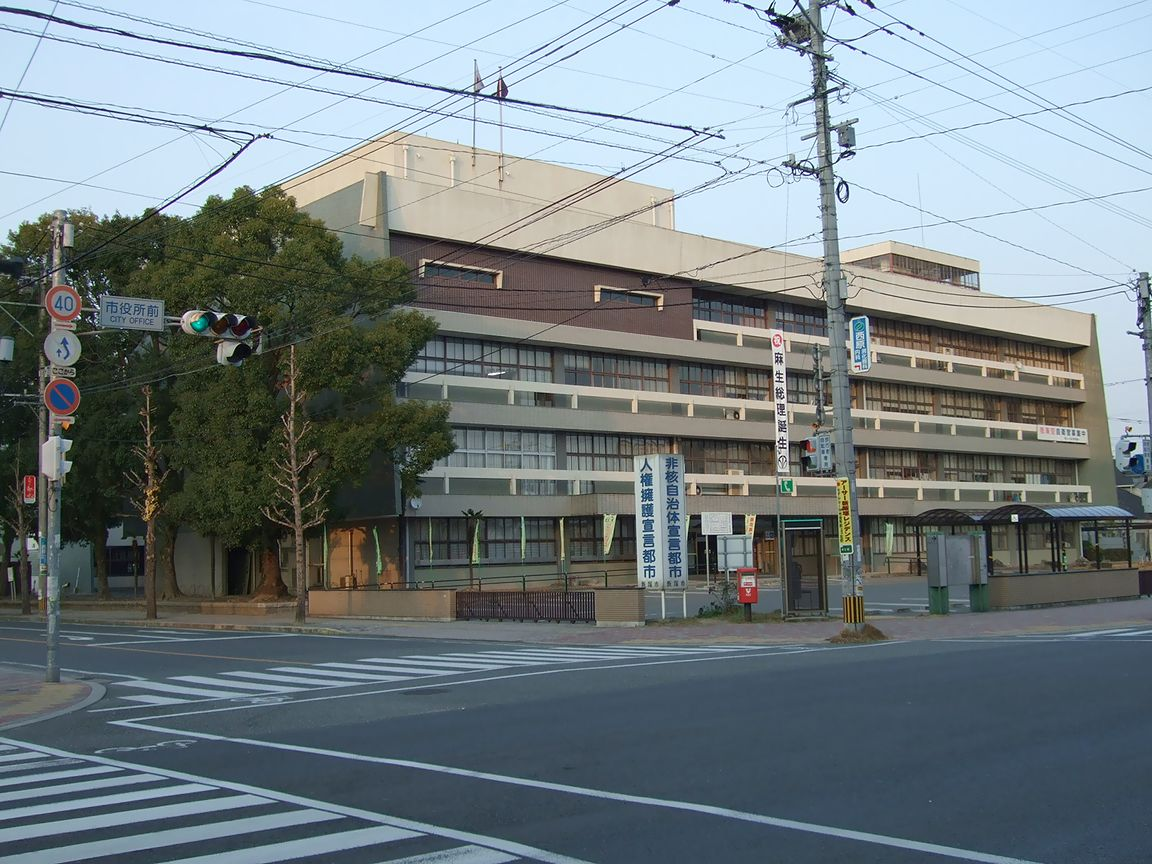
- Iizuka City Hall

- Flag Emblem
- Interactive map of Iizuka
- Location in Japan
- Coordinates: 33°38′48″N 130°41′28″E
- Country: Japan
- Region: Kyushu
- Prefecture: Fukuoka

Government
  - Mayor: Morichika Saitō

Area
  - Total: 213.96 km^{2} (82.61 sq mi)

Population (February 29, 2024)
  - Total: 124,757
  - Density: 583.09/km^{2} (1,510.2/sq mi)
- Time zone: UTC+09:00 (JST)
- City hall address: 5-5 Shintateiwa, Iizuka-shi, Fukuoka-ken 820-8501
- Climate: Cfa
- Website: Official website
- Symbols
- Flower: Cosmos
- Tree: Camphor laurel

Iizuka (飯塚市, Iizuka-shi; Japanese pronunciation: [ìí.(d͡)zɨ́.kä́(.ɕì), íí-]) is a city in Fukuoka Prefecture, Japan. As of 29 February 2024, the city had an estimated population of 124,757 in 63833 households, and a population density of 580 persons per km^{2}. The total area of the city is 213.96 km^{2} (82.61 sq mi).

== Geography ==
Iizuka is the central city of the Chikuho region located in the center of Fukuoka Prefecture, approximately 35 kilometers east of Fukuoka City and approximately 40 kilometers southwest of the center of Kitakyushu City. The Onga River, a first-class river, flows through the central part of the city, and the area forms an urban area. From the northwestern part of the city to the western and southwestern parts of the city, there are mountains ranging in height from 400 to 900 meters, including Mt. Mikoriyama (935.9 meters) and Mt. Toishi (828 meters). There are also several mountains in the eastern part of the city that are between 200 and 300 meters high, forming a small mountain range. Therefore, the central and northern parts of the city are a basin surrounded by mountains. Yagiyama Pass and Shokegoe on the western edge of the city, and Hiyomizu Pass on the southern edge of the city were difficult areas for transportation until roads were developed.

=== Neighboring municipalities ===
Fukuoka Prefecture

- Chikushino
- Chikuzen
- Fukuchi
- Itoda
- Kama
- Keisen
- Kotake
- Miyawaka
- Nōgata
- Sasaguri
- Sue
- Tagawa
- Umi

=== Climate ===
Iizuka has a humid subtropical climate (Köppen Cfa) characterized by warm summers and cool winters with light to no snowfall. The average annual temperature in Iizuka is 15.1 °C. The average annual rainfall is 1560 mm with September as the wettest month. The temperatures are highest on average in August, at around 26.4 °C, and lowest in January, at around 4.0 °C. Precipitation is significant throughout the year, but is much higher in summer than in winter.

Climate data for Iizuka, Fukuoka (1991−2020 normals, extremes 1935−present)
| Month | Jan | Feb | Mar | Apr | May | Jun | Jul | Aug | Sep | Oct | Nov | Dec | Year |
|---|---|---|---|---|---|---|---|---|---|---|---|---|---|
| Record high °C (°F) | 20.8 (69.4) | 23.7 (74.7) | 25.9 (78.6) | 30.3 (86.5) | 34.2 (93.6) | 35.7 (96.3) | 37.6 (99.7) | 38.3 (100.9) | 36.6 (97.9) | 32.9 (91.2) | 28.1 (82.6) | 25.3 (77.5) | 38.3 (100.9) |
| Mean maximum °C (°F) | 15.7 (60.3) | 18.4 (65.1) | 22.1 (71.8) | 27.0 (80.6) | 30.6 (87.1) | 32.4 (90.3) | 35.1 (95.2) | 35.5 (95.9) | 33.2 (91.8) | 28.5 (83.3) | 23.5 (74.3) | 18.0 (64.4) | 35.7 (96.3) |
| Mean daily maximum °C (°F) | 9.6 (49.3) | 11.0 (51.8) | 14.5 (58.1) | 20.0 (68.0) | 24.7 (76.5) | 27.3 (81.1) | 31.0 (87.8) | 32.1 (89.8) | 28.2 (82.8) | 23.2 (73.8) | 17.5 (63.5) | 11.9 (53.4) | 20.9 (69.7) |
| Daily mean °C (°F) | 5.3 (41.5) | 6.2 (43.2) | 9.4 (48.9) | 14.3 (57.7) | 19.1 (66.4) | 22.6 (72.7) | 26.6 (79.9) | 27.3 (81.1) | 23.4 (74.1) | 17.8 (64.0) | 12.3 (54.1) | 7.3 (45.1) | 16.0 (60.7) |
| Mean daily minimum °C (°F) | 1.3 (34.3) | 1.7 (35.1) | 4.6 (40.3) | 9.1 (48.4) | 14.0 (57.2) | 18.9 (66.0) | 23.3 (73.9) | 23.8 (74.8) | 19.7 (67.5) | 13.4 (56.1) | 7.7 (45.9) | 2.9 (37.2) | 11.7 (53.1) |
| Mean minimum °C (°F) | −3.3 (26.1) | −3.0 (26.6) | −1.5 (29.3) | 2.2 (36.0) | 8.0 (46.4) | 13.9 (57.0) | 19.3 (66.7) | 19.9 (67.8) | 14.0 (57.2) | 7.2 (45.0) | 1.4 (34.5) | −2.1 (28.2) | −3.7 (25.3) |
| Record low °C (°F) | −9.7 (14.5) | −8.1 (17.4) | −6.0 (21.2) | −2.4 (27.7) | 1.1 (34.0) | 7.8 (46.0) | 13.1 (55.6) | 15.0 (59.0) | 7.1 (44.8) | −0.4 (31.3) | −2.3 (27.9) | −5.1 (22.8) | −9.7 (14.5) |
| Average precipitation mm (inches) | 76.5 (3.01) | 78.6 (3.09) | 115.5 (4.55) | 128.6 (5.06) | 149.0 (5.87) | 281.8 (11.09) | 347.1 (13.67) | 209.6 (8.25) | 178.0 (7.01) | 89.5 (3.52) | 89.1 (3.51) | 70.3 (2.77) | 1,813.6 (71.4) |
| Average snowfall cm (inches) | 4 (1.6) | 3 (1.2) | 0 (0) | 0 (0) | 0 (0) | 0 (0) | 0 (0) | 0 (0) | 0 (0) | 0 (0) | 0 (0) | 1 (0.4) | 8 (3.2) |
| Average rainy days | 9.8 | 9.5 | 10.9 | 10.0 | 8.6 | 12.0 | 12.1 | 9.8 | 9.9 | 6.8 | 8.8 | 9.2 | 117.4 |
| Average snowy days | 0.9 | 0.9 | 0.1 | 0 | 0 | 0 | 0 | 0 | 0 | 0 | 0.1 | 0.1 | 2.1 |
| Average relative humidity (%) | 72 | 71 | 70 | 69 | 70 | 78 | 80 | 78 | 79 | 76 | 76 | 73 | 74 |
| Mean monthly sunshine hours | 103.0 | 119.4 | 156.6 | 181.9 | 199.8 | 137.3 | 161.0 | 191.2 | 154.5 | 171.0 | 136.9 | 115.6 | 1,828.2 |
Source: Japan Meteorological Agency

=== Demographics ===
Per Japanese census data, the population of Iizuka is as shown below

Historical population
| Year | Pop. | ±% |
|---|---|---|
| 1950 | 194,132 | — |
| 1960 | 186,760 | −3.8% |
| 1970 | 126,934 | −32.0% |
| 1980 | 135,852 | +7.0% |
| 1990 | 139,663 | +2.8% |
| 2000 | 136,701 | −2.1% |
| 2010 | 131,492 | −3.8% |
| 2020 | 126,364 | −3.9% |

== History ==
The area of Iizuka was part of ancient Chikuzen Province. Rice has been cultivated in the fertile alluvial plains of the Onga River system since the Yayoi Period, and ancient kofun are scattered throughout the area. During the Edo Period it was part of the holdings of Fukuoka Domain. After the Meiji restoration, the town of Iizuka was established with the creation of the modern municipalities system on April 1, 1889. Iizuka was raised to city status on January 20, 1932. On March 26, 2006, Iizuka absorbed the towns of Chikuho, Honami, Kaita and Shōnai (all from Kaho District) to create the new and expanded city of Iizuka.

== Government ==
Iizuka has a mayor-council form of government with a directly elected mayor and a unicameral city council of 28 members. Iizuka, together with the town of Keisen contributes two members to the Fukuoka Prefectural Assembly. In terms of national politics, the city is part of the Fukuoka 8th district of the lower house of the Diet of Japan.

== Economy ==
Iizuka was an important post-station on the Nagasaki Kaidō during the Edo Era. As Japan industrialised, Iizuka became the center of the most productive coal fields in Japan located throughout the surrounding Chikuho district. After the end of Second World War there was a large influx of people into the city as it was one of the few areas that offered a large number of jobs in the coal mines and related fields. Since the coal mines closed, Iizuka City has suffered from a consistently declining population base. However, its proximity to both Fukuoka City and Kitakyushu City cushioned the effect of the coal industry shutdown and kept the local economy from going into freefall. Now Iizuka has a strong light industrial base and is a center for education and a rapidly expanding IT economy.

== Education ==
Iizuka has 22 public elementary schools and 9 public junior high schools operated by the city government and one private elementary and one private junior high school. There are one public junior high school and two public high schools operated by the Fukuoka Prefectural Board of Education, and also two private high schools. The prefecture also operates two schools for the handicapped. Kindai University has a junior college in Iizuka.

== Transportation ==
=== Railways ===
JR Kyushu - Chikuhō Main Line (Fukuhoku Yutaka Line)

JC - Tentō - Iizuka - Shin-Iizuka - Urata - Namazuta

JR Kyushu - Chikuhō Main Line (Haruda Line)

JG - Chikuzen-Uchino - Kami-Honami

JR Kyushu - Sasaguri Line

JC - Chikuzen-Daibu - Kurōbaru

JR Kyushu - Gotōji Line

JJ - Chikuzen-Shōnai - <Shimo-Kamoo> Kami-Mio - Shin-Iizuka

=== Highways ===
- National Route 200
- National Route 201
- National Route 211

== Sister cities ==
- Sunnyvale, California, United States

== Local attractions ==
- Chikuhō Coalfield Sites
- Daibu temple ruins, National Historic Site

== Notable people from Iizuka ==
- Tarō Asō, former prime minister, was born in Iizuka and retains a large house in the city.
- Mika Hijii, actress, gravure idol
- Mari Shirato, actress
- Yumi Yoshino, actress

== In popular culture ==
- Japanese filmmaker Hiroshi Teshigahara chose Iizuka as the setting for his film Pitfall which takes place in the coal mines. The film was a collaboration with the author of Pitfall, Kōbō Abe. Teshigahara stated in an interview that Iizuka closely resembled the landscape depicted in the novel.

== See also ==
- Coto Coto Train, a touristic service
- Tateiwa (archaeological site)
