= Shii Station =

Shii Station (志井駅) is the name of two train stations in Japan:

- Shii Station (JR Kyushu)
- Shii Station (Kitakyushu Monorail)
