= Kami-Honami Station =

Railway station in Iizuka, Fukuoka Prefecture, Japan

JG 02 Kami-Honami Station 上穂波駅
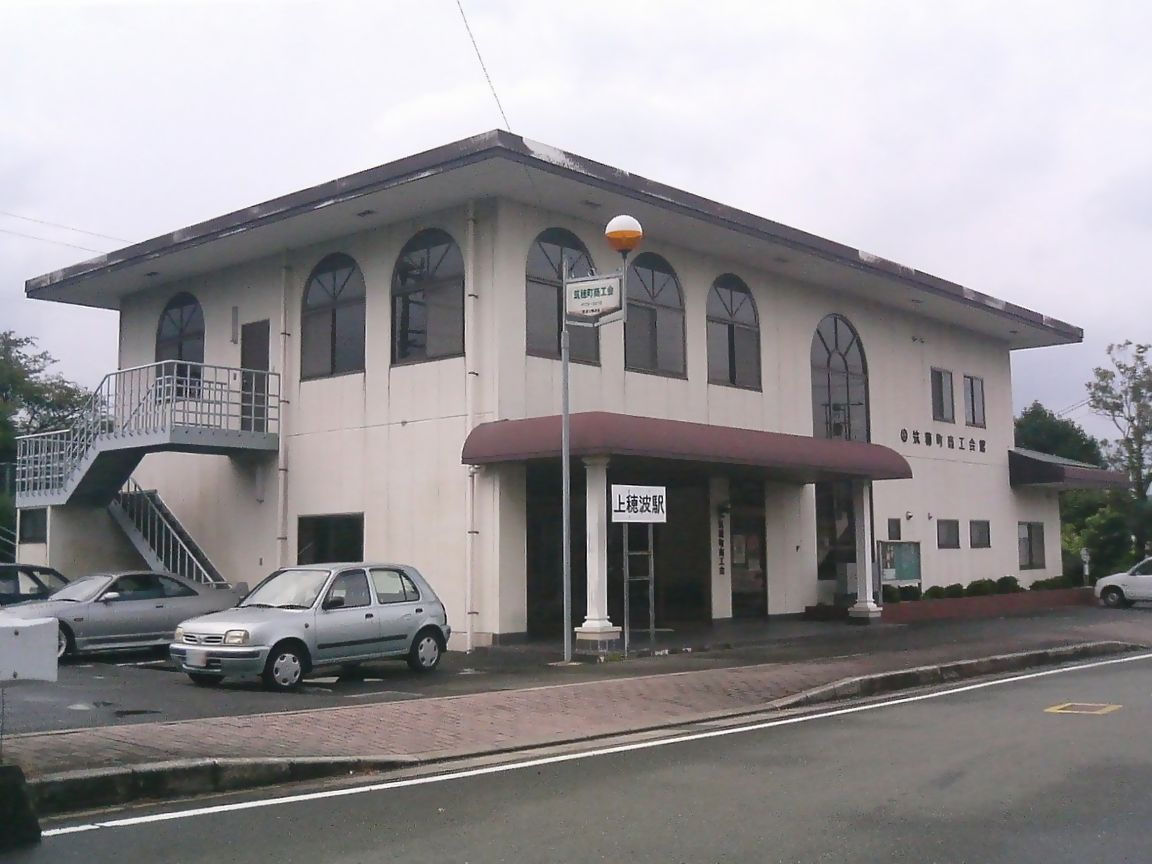
- Kami-Honami Station in 2007

General information
- Location: Ae, Iizuka-shi, Fukuoka-ken 820-0704; Japan
- Coordinates: 33°34′01″N 130°38′43″E
- Operator: JR Kyushu
- Line: JG Chikuhō Main Line
- Distance: 48.1 km from Wakamatsu
- Platforms: 1 side platform
- Tracks: 1

Construction
- Structure type: At grade

Other information
- Status: Unstaffed
- Website: Official website

History
- Opened: 15 July 1928

Passengers
- FY2016: 58

Services
Preceding station	JR Kyushu	Following station
Chikuzen-Uchino JG 03 towards Haruda	Chikuhō Main Line (Haruda Line)	Keisen JG 01 Terminus
Location
- Location within Fukuoka Prefecture Location within Japan

Kami-Honami Station (上穂波駅, Kami-honami-eki) is a passenger railway station located in the city of Iizuka, Fukuoka Prefecture, Japan. It is operated by JR Kyushu.

== Lines ==
The station is served by the Chikuhō Main Line and is located 48.1 km from the starting point of the line at Wakamatsu.

== Station layout ==
The station consists of a side platform serving a single track. Across the track can be seen another, disused side platform as well as the track bed of a second track which has since been removed. The station shares a large two-storey building with the local chamber of commerce and industry. The station part of the building is unstaffed and only houses a waiting room and automatic ticket vending machines. Access to the platform from the station building is by means of a short flight of steps.

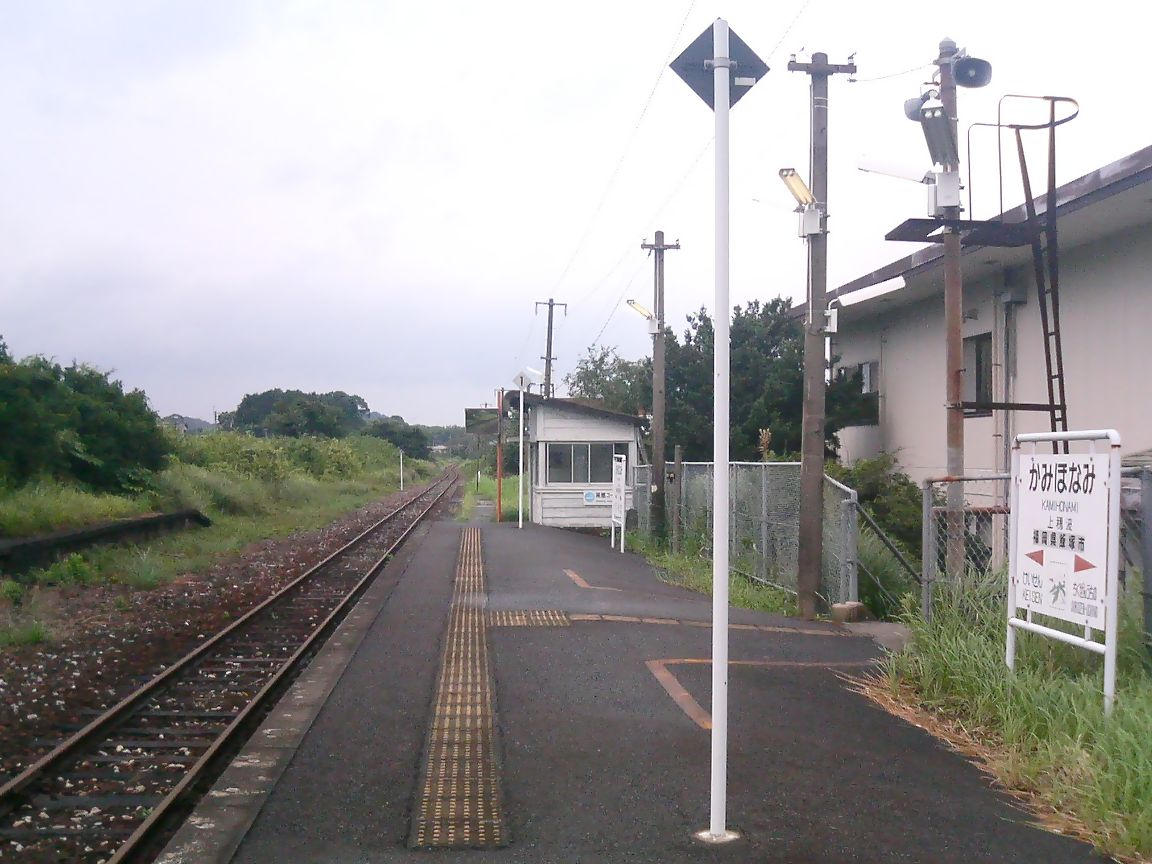
Station platform and track. Note the disused platform and former track bed to the left. The kink in the track in the distance also indicates the station once had two tracks.

== History ==
Japanese Government Railways (JGR) opened Kami-Honami on 15 July 1928 as an intermediate station when it extended the track of the then Nagao Line from Nagao (now Keisen to a new southern terminus at Chikuzen-Uchino. On 7 December 1929, Kami-Honami became part of the Chikuho Main Line when the Nagao Line was merged with the former. With the privatization of Japanese National Railways (JNR), the successor of JGR, on 1 April 1987, control of the station passed to JR Kyushu.

Station numbering was introduced on 28 September 2018 with Kami-Honami being assigned station number JG02.

== Surrounding area ==
- Iizuka City Hall Chikuho Branch
- Iizuka City Kamihonami Elementary School
- Iizuka City Chikuho Junior High School

== See also ==
- List of railway stations in Japan
