= Urata Station =

Railway station in Iizuka, Fukuoka Prefecture, Japan

JC 15 Urata Station 浦田駅
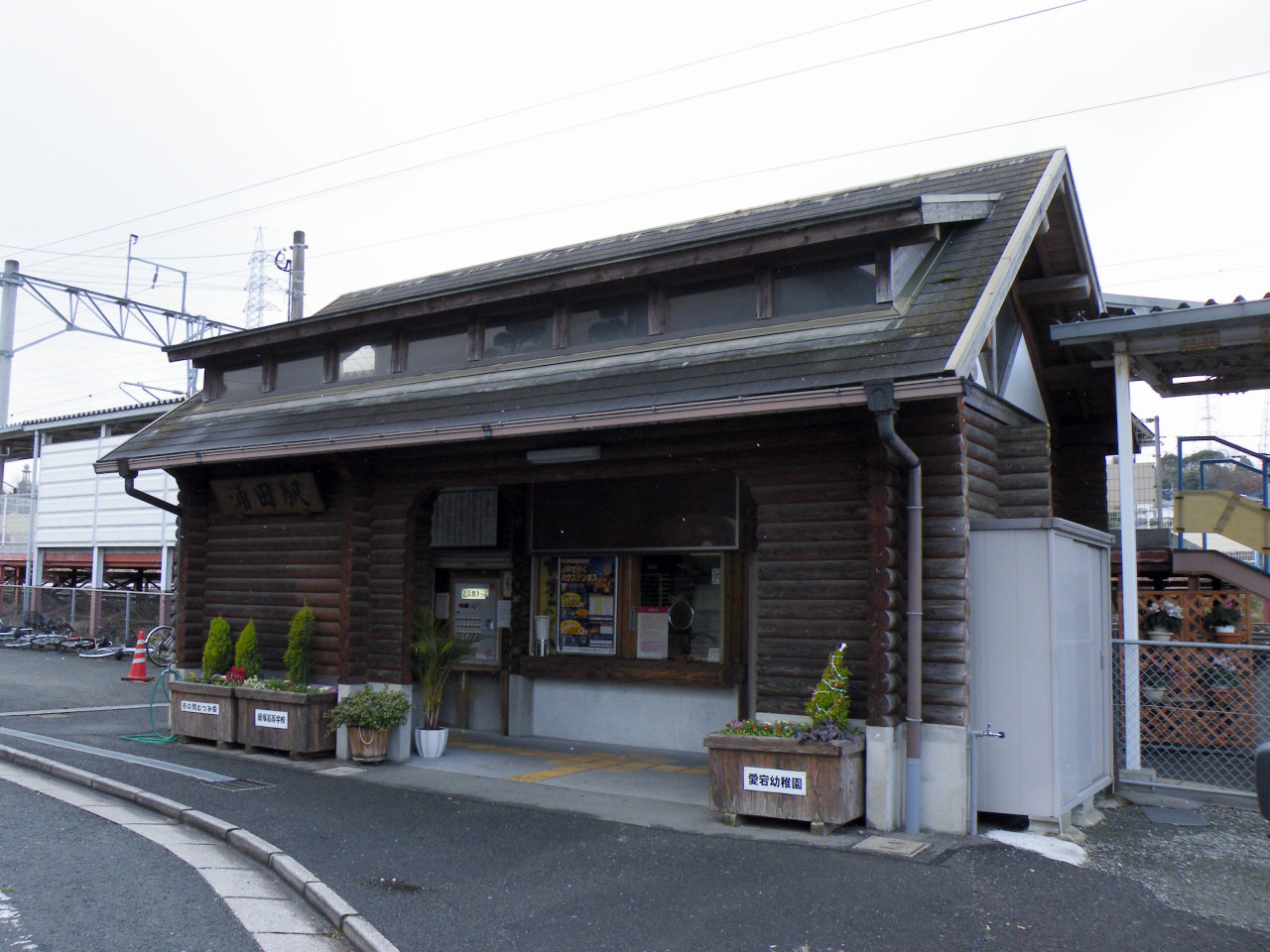
- Urata Station in 2009

General information
- Location: 2415-2 Namazuta, Iizuka-shi, Fukuoka-ken 820-0001; Japan
- Coordinates: 33°39′23″N 130°41′58″E
- Operator: JR Kyushu
- Line: JC Chikuhō Main Line
- Distance: 36.2 km from Wakamatsu
- Platforms: 2 side platforms
- Tracks: 2

Construction
- Structure type: At grade
- Accessible: No - platforms linked by level crossing with steps

Other information
- Status: Unstaffed
- Website: Official website

History
- Opened: 11 March 1989

Passengers
- FY2016: 288 daily

Services
Preceding station	JR Kyushu	Following station
Shin-Iizuka towards Haruda	Chikuhō Main Line Local	Namazuta towards Wakamatsu
Location
- Location within Fukuoka Prefecture Location within Japan

Urata Station (浦田駅, Urata-eki) is a passenger railway station located in the city of Iizuka, Fukuoka Prefecture, Japan. It is operated by JR Kyushu.

== Lines ==
The station is served by the Chikuhō Main Line and is located 36.2 km from the starting point of the line at Wakamatsu.

== Station layout ==
The station, which is unstaffed, consists of two side platforms serving two tracks. A station building in a traditional log house design houses a waiting room and automatic ticket vending machines. Access to the opposite platform from the station building is by means of a level crossing which has steps at both ends. On the other side of the tracks from the station building is a separate entrance to the station. This is a flight of steps up a hill slope from the main road and leads directly to platform 2.

=== Platforms ===
1	■ JC Chikuhō Main Line	for Shin-Iizuka and Hakata
2	■ JC Chikuhō Main Line	for Nōgata and Orio

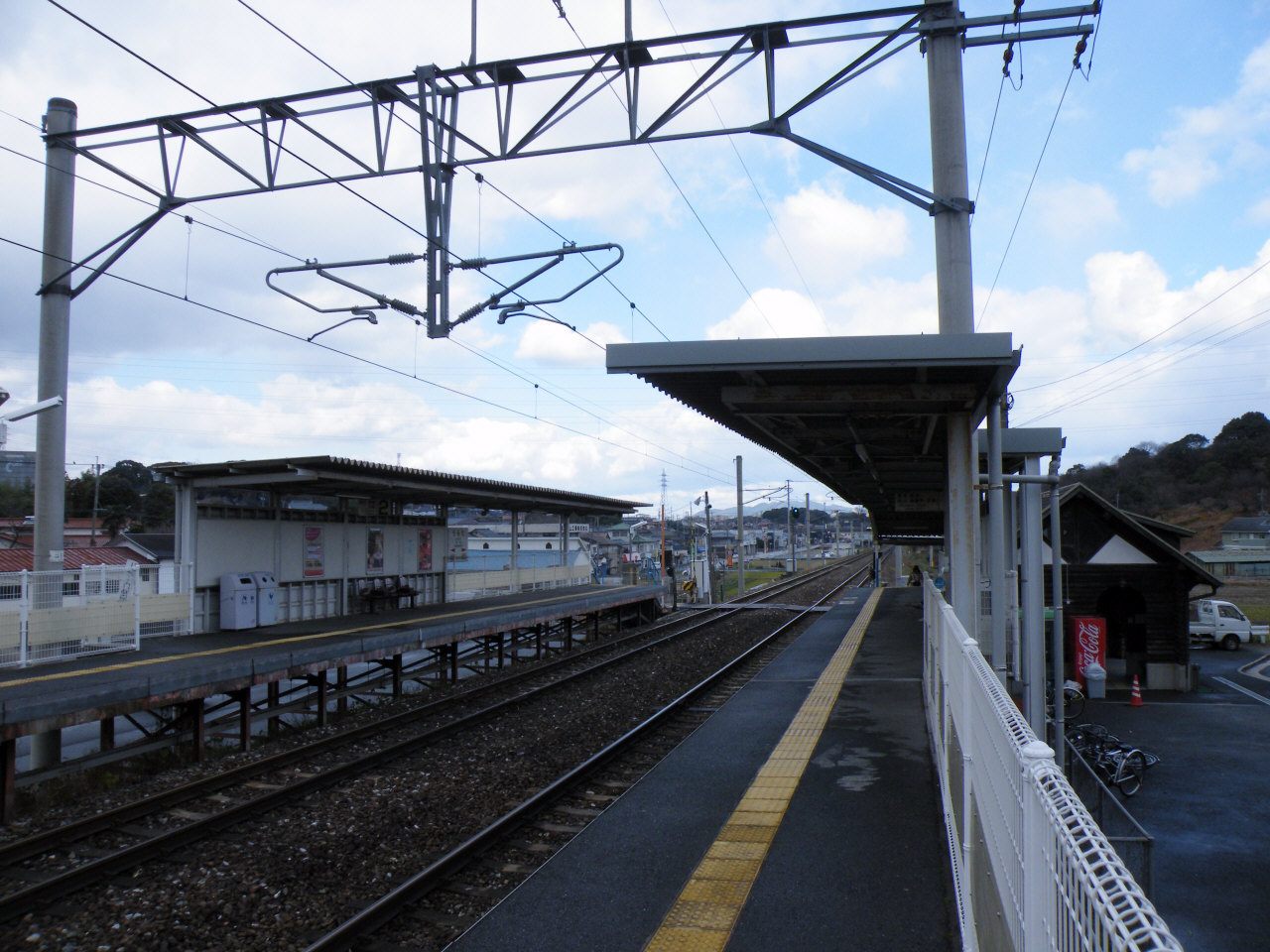
A view of the station platforms and tracks.

== History ==
The station was opened by JR Kyushu on 11 March 1989 as an additional station on the existing Chikuhō Main Line track.

== Passenger statistics ==
In fiscal 2016, the daily average number of passengers using the station (boarding passengers only) was above 100 and below 323. The station did not rank among the top 300 busiest stations of JR Kyushu.

== Surrounding area ==
The Iizuka Auto Race Course is about a 15-minute walk from the station.

- Iizuka Citizens Sports Park

== See also ==
- List of railway stations in Japan
