= Hiraodai Nature Observation Center =

Gallery in Kitakyushu, Fukuoka, Japan

- 平尾台自然観察センター
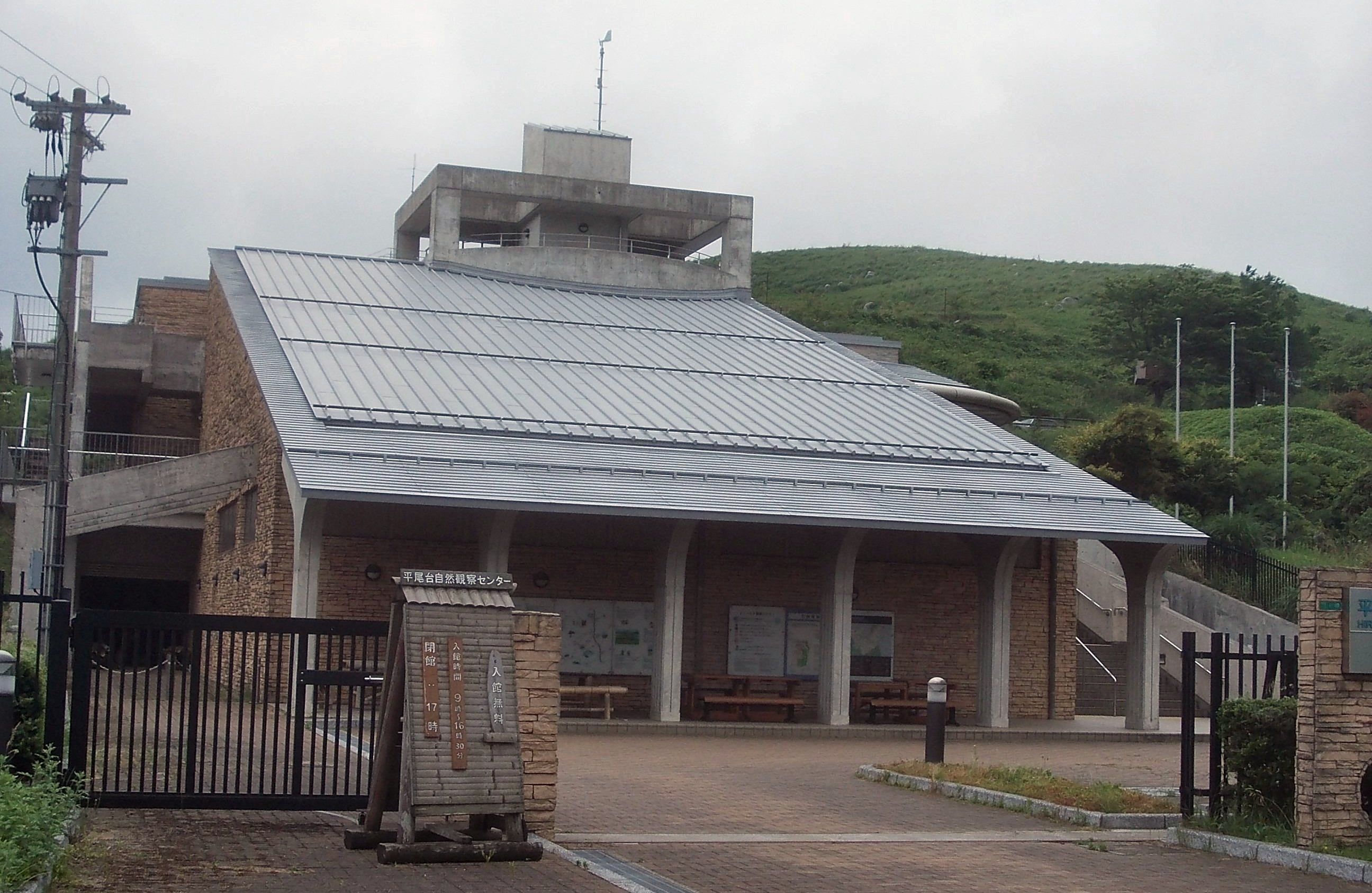

- Location within Japan Location within Fukuoka Prefecture Location within Kitakyushu
- Interactive map of the Hiraodai Nature Observation Center area

General information
- Type: gallery
- Location: Kokuraminami, Kitakyushu, Fukuoka, Japan
- Coordinates: 33°45′22.6″N 130°53′39.9″E

The Hiraodai Nature Observation Center (Japanese: 平尾台自然観察センター) is a museum in Kokuraminami Ward, Kitakyushu City, Fukuoka Prefecture, Japan.

== Exhibitions ==
The center explains about limestone and limestone caves formation.

== Transportation ==
The center is accessible within walking distance southeast of Ishiharamachi Station of Kyushu Railway Company.

== See also ==
- Geology of Japan
