= Gotōji Line =

Railway line in Fukuoka Prefecture, Japan

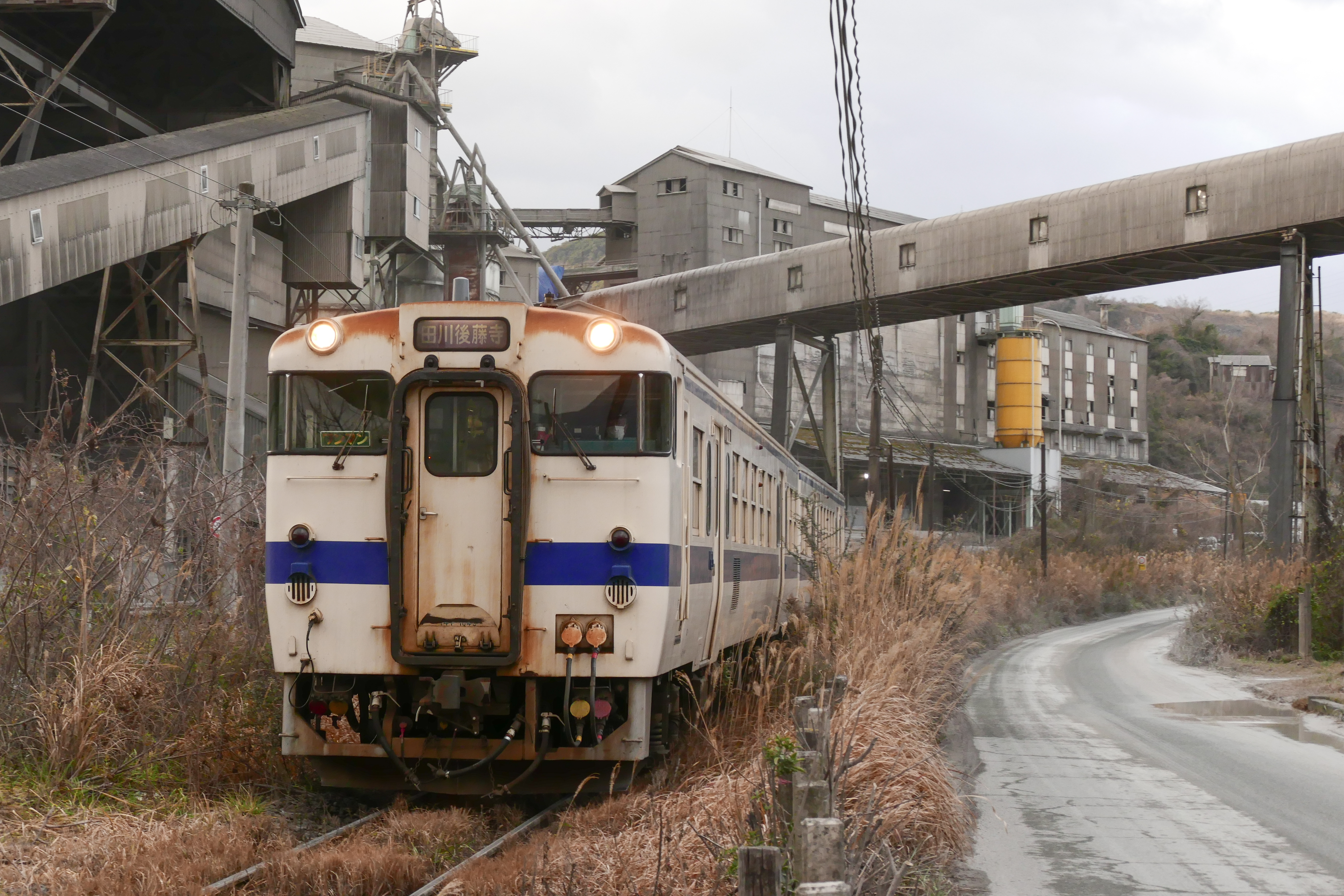

Overview
- Status: In operation
- Owner: JR Kyushu
- Locale: Fukuoka Prefecture
- Termini: Tagawa-Gotōji; Shin-Iizuka
- Stations: 6

Service
- Type: Heavy rail
- Operator: JR Kyushu
- Rolling stock: KiHa 40 series DMU

History
- Opened: 1897; 129 years ago

Technical
- Line length: 13.3 km (8.3 mi)
- Number of tracks: Entire line single tracked
- Character: Rural
- Track gauge: 1,067 mm (3 ft 6 in)
- Electrification: None
- Operating speed: 85 km/h (53 mph)
Route map
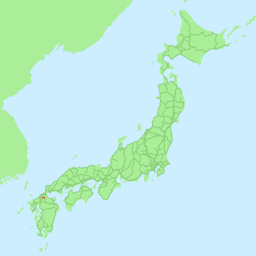

The Gotōji Line (後藤寺線, Gotōji-sen) is a Japanese railway line in Fukuoka Prefecture connecting Tagawa-Gotōji Station in the city of Tagawa and Shin-Iizuka Station in the city of Iizuka. It is part of the JR Kyushu network.

== Basic data ==
- Operator, distances:
  - Kyushu Railway Company (JR Kyushu) (Services and tracks)
    - Tagawa-Gotōji – Shin-Iizuka: 13.3 km (8.3 mi)
- Gauge: Narrow gauge, 1,067 mm (3 ft 6 in)
- Stations: 6
- Double-tracking: None
- Electrification: None
- Railway signalling: Special automatic

== Services ==
As of September 2025, services operate approximately every 30 minutes during morning and afternoon peak hours and hourly at other times.

There is one rapid train every day departing Tagawa-Gotōji at 08:02 and operating non-stop to Shin-Iizuka, arriving at 08:18. All other services on the Line are Local trains, stopping at every station.

== Stations ==
- All stations are located in Fukuoka Prefecture.
- Rapid trains, which only operate in the direction of Tagawa-Gotōji, stop at stations marked "●" and pass stations marked "↑".

No.	Station	Japanese	Distance (km)	Rapid	Transfers	Location
JJ 06	Tagawa-Gotōji	田川後藤寺	0.0	●	JI Hitahikosan Line ■ Heisei Chikuhō Railway Itoda Line	Tagawa
JJ 05	Funao	船尾	3.4	↑		Tagawa
JJ 04	Chikuzen-Shōnai	筑前庄内	7.1	↑		Iizuka
JJ 03	Shimo-Kamoo	下鴨生	8.3	↑		Kama
JJ 02	Kami-Mio	上三緒	10.2	↑		Iizuka
JJ 01	Shin-Iizuka	新飯塚	13.3	●	JC Fukuhoku Yutaka Line (Chikuhō Main Line)	Iizuka

== Rolling stock ==
=== Current rolling stock ===
- KiHa 40 series DMU

=== Former rolling stock ===
- KiHa 31 series[ja] DMU

== History ==
The Hōshū Railway Co. opened the central section of the line in 1897 to haul freight, the company merging with the Kyushu Railway Co. in 1901, which extended the line to Kami-Mio in 1902. That company was nationalised in 1909, and the line extended to Shin-Iizuka in 1920 with passenger services to Funao introduced at that time.

The Kyushu Industrial Railway Co. opened the Funao - Tagawa-Gotoji section in 1922 to service a cement plant. That company was nationalised in 1943, creating the current line. Passenger services were extended to Tagawa-Gotoji in 1945, and freight services ceased in 1987.

=== Former connecting lines ===
Shimo-Kamoo station -

- A 1 km line to the Asakasa coal mine operated from 1926 until 1945.
- The 8 km Urushio line to Shimo-Yamada (on the Kami-Yamada line, closed in 1986) opened between 1908 and 1913 as a freight line, with passenger services introduced in 1920. Freight services ceased in 1974, and the line closed in 1986.
