= Yumi Yoshino =

Japanese actress (born 1980)

- 芳野 友美
- Born: 2 July 1980 (age 45); Iizuka, Fukuoka, Japan
- Other name: Wakame Yoshino
- Occupation: Actress
- Agent: Production Harmony
- Height: 157 cm (5 ft 2 in)
- Website: Yumi Yoshino official blog

Yumi Yoshino (芳野 友美, Yoshino Yumi; born 2 July 1980, in Iizuka, Fukuoka) is a Japanese actress. She is represented with Production Harmony.

== Biography ==
- In 1997, Yoshino won Shufu to Seikatsusha Junon "S.S Girls Contest" Jury Special Award. In the same year, she received the Eye'X "Beautiful Girl with Eyes" Grand Prix.
- In 2000, Yoshino debuted as Wakame Yoshino (芳野わかめ, Yoshino Wakame) in Tomoe Shinohara's production "2000 Star" but also to "concentrate on studying" in April 2001.
- After graduating from university, she restored her entertainment name to real name around 2003 and resumed entertainment activities as an actress.
- Yoshino started to appear in the reproduction VTR of Fuji Television's Wakatte chōdai!, and then she has a reputation for the S character because of Noch's role as a lady played at Gyōretsu no dekiru Hōritsu Sōdanjo.
- She has a younger brother under two years old.

== Filmography ==
=== Television dramas ===
Date	Title	Role	Network	Notes
2004	Otori Sōsakan Shiho Kitami Special		EX	
2008	Tama Minami-sho Tatakiage Keiji Heikitsu Chikamatsu 8: Saigo no Message		TX	
2008	Īfufu ni naru tame no 3-ttsu no Hiketsu "Otto no Keitai"		Family Gekijo	
2010	Indigo no Yoru	Akechi family's helper	THK	Episode 11
2010	Getsuyō Golden: Tsuri Keiji		TBS	
2010	Ryōmaden		NHK	
2011	Ohisama		NHK	Episode 45
24 Jul 2011	[Hanazakari no Kimitachi e: Ikemen Paradise 2011		CX	Episode 3
2012	Yame Ken no Onna 3		EX	
2012	Kamen Rider Fourze		EX	
20 Jan 2012	13-Sai no Hello Work	Chisato Saeki	EX	Episode 2
12 Jul 2012	Beginners!		TBS	Episode 1
2013	Yae no Sakura	Nui	NHK	Episodes 35 and 36
4 Sep 2013	Kodoku no Gourmet	Clerk	TX	Episode 9
3 Oct 2013	Seicho Matsumoto Special: Kao		CX	
4 Oct 2013	Shōgeki Gouraigan!!	Yumi-san (quasi-regular)	TX	Episode 1; guest
12 Oct 2013	Jikken Keiji Totori 2	Emi Nagase	NHK	Episode 1
2014	Hanako to Anne	Kana's maiden / Chikuho's word guidance	NHK	
23 May 2014	Garo: Makai no Hana	Mami	TX	Episode 8
13 Jun 2014	Maruho no Onna: Hoken Hanzai Chōsa-in	Nurse	TX	
11 Sep 2014	Doctor Heart: Kōsuke Yabuta no Jiken Karute	Yoshie Kimura	TX	
29 Mar 2015	Watashi wa Chichi ga Kiraidesu	Yu Nishie	NHK BS Premium	
28 Apr 2015	Bijo to Danshi	Mayumi Kirino	NHK	Episode 3
2024	Kamen Rider Gavv	Hajime's Mother	EX	

=== Films ===
Year	Title	Notes
2001	Naoko	As Wakame Yoshino
2004	Kekko Kamen Returns	
2006	Tachibana-kun no baka	Lead role
2007	WBG Westbound Girls	
2009	Othello Michi	
2011	Avatar	
2011	Sachiko no Baai.	Lead role
2013	Hi Ai	
2013	Kairyū o Mita Hi	

=== Variety (reproduction dramas) ===
Run	Title	Role	Network
2007	Wakatte chōdai!		CX
2007	Masahiro Nakai no Kinyōbi no Suma-tachi e	Masami Hisamoto	TBS
2007	Hiroyuki Ehara Special: Tengoku kara no Tegami		CX
2007	Dokusen! Kinyōbi no Kokuhaku	Hitomi Ishikawa	CX
2007	Shūkan OriRaji Keizai Hakusho	Mie	NTV
2007–08	Hapifuru!		CX
2008–	Gyōretsu no dekiru Hōritsu Sōdanjo		NTV
2008–	Jinsei ga Kawaru 1-funkan no Fukaīhanashi		NTV
2008–10	Spice TV: Dōmo Kininaru!		CX
2008, 2009, 2011, 2012	24 Hour Television "Love Saves the Earth"		NTV
2008–09	Saraba! Kireru Otona Shin Tokyo Hito no Sentaku		NHK
2009–10	Honne no Dendō!! Shinsuke ni hawa karumai'		CX
2009–	Unbelievable		CX
2009	Saturday Value Fever: Tsuma wa Mita! Ijin no Suppin: Aru Fūfu no Ai no Monogatari	Tsumaki Hiroko (Akechi Mitsuhide's wife)	NTV
2009	Sanma & SMAP! Bijo to Yajū no Christmas Special		NTV
2010	Suki ni natta Hito		NTV
2010–11	Kinyōbi no Kiseki		CX
2011	3-Funkan de Kiseki o Okose! Ultraman Dash		NTV
2011	The Categorizer		NTV
2011	Hirunandesu!		NTV
2011	Sedai Betsu Time Slip Show "Sai Sentān"		TBS
2011	Sekai 1 no Shō Time: Gyara o Kimeru no wa Anata Dai 4-dan		NTV
2012	Seiki no Wide Show! The Konya wa History		TBS
2012	Chō Saigen! Mystery	Hiroko Shoto (offender)	NTV
2012	Watashi no Nani ga Ike nai no?		TBS
2012	Detorira		CX
2012	Getsuyō kara Yofukashi		NTV
2012	Otome to Tsumi to Bachi!! Hontō ni atta Tonari no Jiken File		TX
2012, 2013	Fūfu Mondai Variety! Love Nep		TBS
2013	Butcha ke Kokuhaku! Coming Out!		CX
2013	Generation Tengoku		CX
2013	Ariehen Sekai		TX

=== Other TV appearances ===
Date	Title	Network	Ref.
	Digital Pants	Sky PerfecTV!	Regular
	Happy Pasokon Life	Sky PerfecTV!	Regular
2006–07	Seikatsu Tatsujin	TBS	Regular
2007	Zenryoku-zaka	EX	
2010	Kon Katsu ABeeC Dai Jiten	BeeTV	
2012	Sunday Junction	TBS	
2012	Joshi Jikara Counselor Naoko	JCN, J:Com	
2013	Burupen	Ustream	Guest appearance
2013	Anatameman	Fuji TV Kenzan-raku	Guest appearance
6 Jun 2017	Matsuko no Shiranai Sekai	TBS	Reproduction of actress world

=== Stage ===
Year	Title	Location	Notes
2006	Shōnen Oyaji Dainikai Kōen Kasabuta –Makino-ka no Kōfukuna Hitobito–	Sunny Side Theater	Written and directed by Takuro Oikawa
2007	again	Team Japan Spec.	Theater Green
2007	No Pain, No Gain.	Team Japan Spec.	Shinjuku 107
2009	Backyard –Kawaii dakeja Dame kashira–	Tokyo Metropolitan Theatre	First Pick performance
2010	Yudaya Onna	Nogizaka Koredo Theater	A.M.D Planning Vol. 19
2014	but-and	Shinjuku Theater Molière	Gekidan Dankon 15th performance

=== Advertisements ===
Year	Product	Notes
1997	Eye'X	
1999	NTT DoCoMo Tokai	As Wakame Yoshino
2000	Circle K	Image advert song and appearance; as Wakame Yoshino
2004	Taisho Pharmaceutical Co. Taisho Oriental gastrointestinal drug	
2008, 2010	Yodobashi Camera	Year contract
2010	GyaO! Store	
2010	Kao Corporation Men's Biore	
2012	L'Oréal Paris Elsave Damage Care ProEx Quick Oil Repair Treatment	
2013	Best Bridal Kazoku Kyoshiki	

=== DVD ===
Year	Title
2003	Tropical Bambino
2004	breath
2006	Sweet Room –Amai Yūwaku–
2013	Triangle

=== Others ===
Title	Notes
Kyushu Asahi Broadcasting Duòmo	Mook book image girl
Junon "S.S Girls Contest" Jury Special Award	
Eye'X "Beautiful Girl with Eyes" Grand Prix	
TDK MD Package	
Tokuma Shoten Hyper Hobby	Interview
Bestsellers Circus Max	Interview
Futabasha Kokoro yasuragu Shukubō no Tabi	Experience report
