= Tateiwa (archaeological site) =

Yayoi ruins in Kyushu

Tateiwa Iseki
- 立岩遺跡 (Japanese)
- Tateiwa Archaeological Site
- Interactive map of Tateiwa Iseki
- 33°39′04.7″N 130°41′35.8″E
- Type: settlement
- Periods: Yayoi period
- Location: Iizuka, Fukuoka Prefecture, Japan
- Region: Kyushu

History
- Built: 1st century BCE

Tateiwa (立岩遺跡, Tateiwa iseki) is an archaeological site located in Iizuka, Fukuoka, near the confluence of the Honami and Kama rivers. The site contains the remnants of a Yayoi community dating from approximately the 1st century BCE, including a cemetery site named Tateiwa-Hotta (立岩堀田, Tateiwa hotta) where local figures were buried.

The site is known for being a large-scale centre of production for stone tools during the Yayoi period, particularly during the Middle Yayoi. Stone rice reaping tools from Tateiwa were traded throughout northern Kyushu, having "been found in more than a dozen sites within a fifty-kilometer radius" of the site.

Stone tools such as axes and arrowheads with uniquely Middle Mumun period Korean characteristics were found in the Tateiwa site, indicating the inhabitants were influenced by or were themselves Toraijin.

== Tateiwa-Hotta ==
The site of Tateiwa-Hotta cemetery contains 45 burials, of which 43 are jar burials: the site began to be used around the 1st century BCE until around the year AD 50. Several of these sites are noteworthy for containing imported goods from the Asian continent, such as weapons and tools made of metals such as iron and bronze, along with a vast amount of ceremonial mirrors imported from the Han dynasty commandery of Lelang. Graves consisted of a square pit with a secondary horizontal pit in which the body was placed.

The cemetery as a whole was composed of smaller "sequential burial clusters" of two or three graves, where new burials would be placed parallel, adjacent, or in front of other graves in order to draw a continuity between the dead, connecting the leader of the funeral to the lineage of the dead being buried. Each sequential burial cluster constituted a distinct genealogical line of important figures in Tateiwa. The people buried in the site have been variously associated with a single chiefly extended family, three generations of chiefs and their kin, or several local leaders of hamlets which together composed Tateiwa village, although the specific attribution of roles to the dead is disputed.
