= Tentō Station =

Railway station in Iizuka, Fukuoka Prefecture, Japan

JC 12 Tentō Station 天道駅
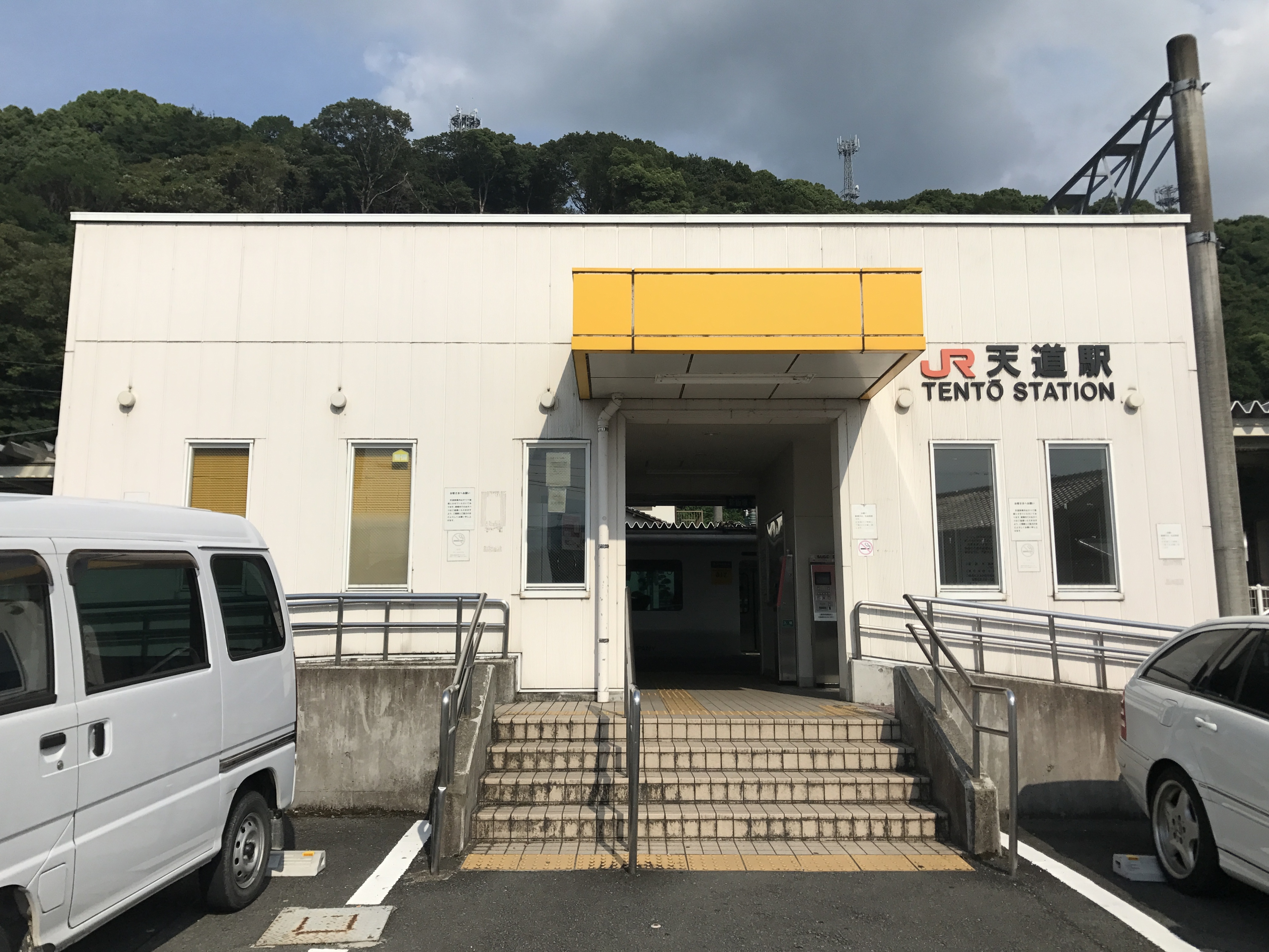
- Tentō Station in 2017

General information
- Location: Tento, Iizuka-shi, Fukuoka-ken 820-0075; Japan
- Coordinates: 33°36′19″N 130°40′40″E
- Operator: JR Kyushu
- Line: JC Chikuhō Main Line
- Distance: 42.3 km from Wakamatsu
- Platforms: 2 side platforms
- Tracks: 2

Construction
- Structure type: At grade
- Parking: Available
- Accessible: No - platforms linked by footbridge

Other information
- Status: Unstaffed
- Website: Official website

History
- Opened: 12 December 1901

Passengers
- FY2020: 4215 daily
- Rank: 236th (among JR Kyushu stations)

Services
| Preceding station | JR Kyushu | Following station |
|---|---|---|
| Keisen JC 11 towards Haruda | Chikuhō Main Line Local | Iizuka JC 13 towards Wakamatsu |
Location
- Location within Fukuoka Prefecture Location within Japan

Tentō Station (天道駅, Tentō-eki) is a passenger railway station located in the city of Iizuka, Fukuoka Prefecture, Japan. It is operated by JR Kyushu.

== Lines ==
The station is served by the Chikuhō Main Line and is located 42.3 km from the starting point of the line at Wakamatsu.

== Station layout ==
The station consists of two staggered side platforms serving two tracks. A station building of modern concrete design houses a waiting room and automatic ticket vending machines. There is a ramp up to the station building entrance from the access road but access to the opposite side platform is by means of a sheltered footbridge.

=== Platforms ===
| 1 | ■ JC Chikuhō Main Line | for Nōgata and Orio |
| 2 | ■ JC Chikuhō Main Line | for Keisen and Hakata |

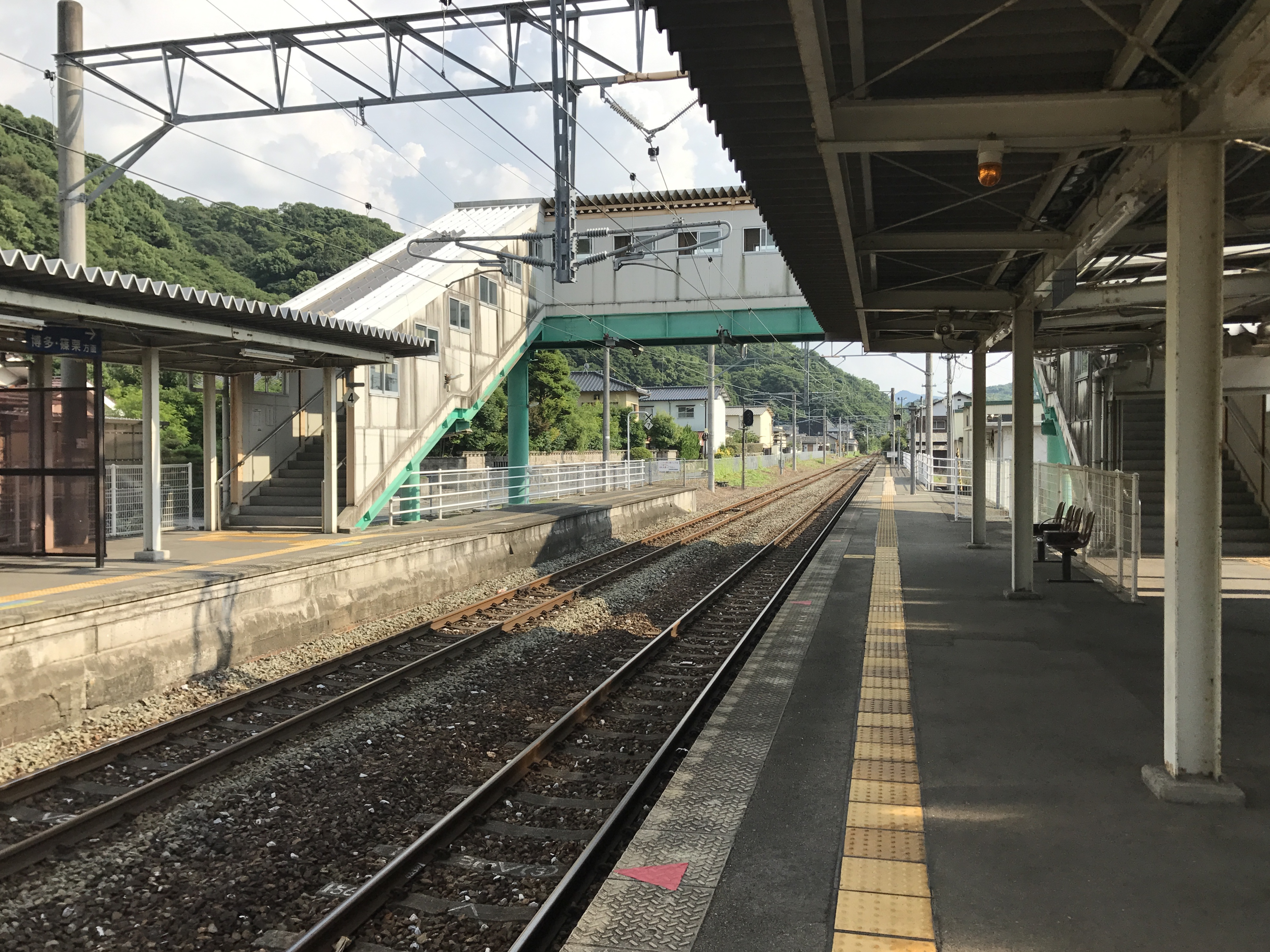
A view of the station platforms and tracks.

== Adjacent stations ==
| ← | Service | → |
Chikuhō Main Line
| Iizuka | Local | Keisen |

== History ==
The privately run Chikuho Kogyo Railway had opened a track from Wakamatsu to Nōgata on 30 August 1891 and, after several phases of extension, the track had reached south to Iizuka by 1893. On 1 October 1897, the Chikuho Kogyo Railway, now renamed the Chikuho Railway, merged with the Kyushu Railway. Kyushu Railway undertook the next phase of expansion by extending the track to Keisen, then named Nagao, and establishing it as the new southern terminus on 12 December 1901. Tento was opened on the same day as an intermediate station on this new stretch of track. After the Kyushu Railway was nationalized on 1 July 1907, Japanese Government Railways (JGR) took over control of the station. On 12 October 1909, the track to Iizuka was designated the Chikuho Main Line while the track from Iizuka to Nagao was designated the Nagao Line. On 7 December 1929, both lines were merged and the station became part of the Chikuho Main Line. With the privatization of Japanese National Railways (JNR), the successor of JGR, on 1 April 1987, control of the station passed to JR Kyushu.

== Passenger statistics ==
In fiscal 2020, the station was used by a daily average of 415 boarding passengers, making it the 236th busiest station on the JR Kyushu network.。

== Surrounding area ==
- Tentō Jinja

== See also ==
- List of railway stations in Japan
