= Shii Station (JR Kyushu) =

Railway station in Kitakyushu, Japan

JI 07 Shii Station 志井駅
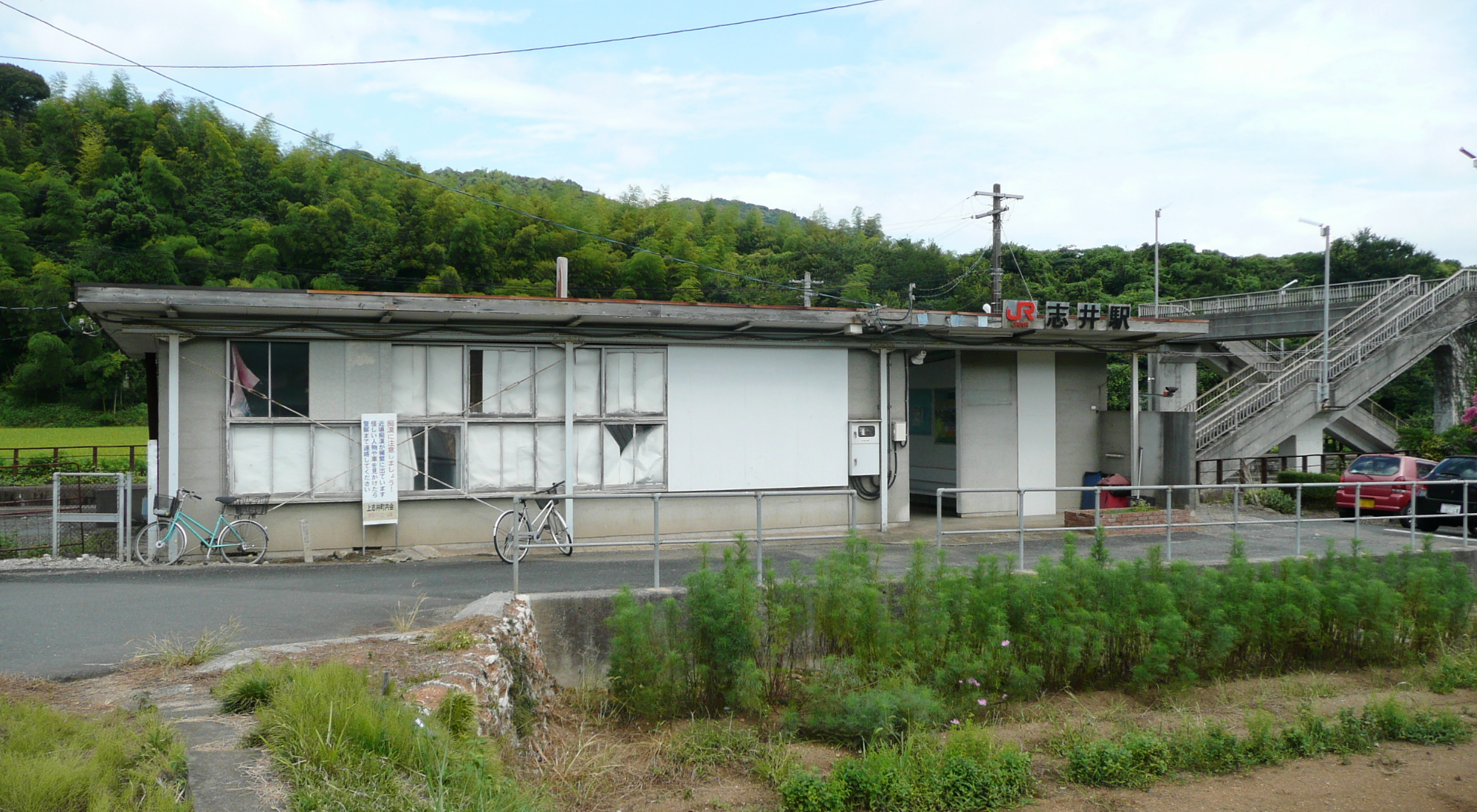
- Shii Station in August 2008

General information
- Location: Shii, Kokuraminami-ku, Kitakyushu-shi, Fukuoka-ken 802-0985; Japan
- Coordinates: 33°48′13″N 130°52′29″E
- Operator: JR Kyushu
- Line: JI Hitahikosan Line
- Distance: 6.8 km from Jōno
- Platforms: 2 side platforms
- Tracks: 2

Other information
- Status: Unstaffed
- Station code: JI07
- Website: Official website

History
- Opened: 25 February 1943

Passengers
- FY2016: 83

Services
| Preceding station | JR Kyushu | Following station |
|---|---|---|
| Ishiharamachi towards Yoake | Hitahikosan Line | Shii-Kōen towards Kokura |
Location
- Location within Fukuoka Prefecture Location within Japan

Shii Station (志井駅, Shii-eki) is a passenger railway station located in Kokuraminami-ku, Kitakyūshū, Fukuoka Prefecture, Japan. It is operated by JR Kyushu.

== Lines ==
The station is served by the Hitahikosan Line and is located 6.8 km from the starting point of the line at Jōno. One train per hour stops at the station during the daytime, increased to two per hour during the morning and evening peaks.

== Layout ==
The station consists of two opposed side platforms connected to the station building by a footbridge. The station is unattended.

=== Platforms ===
| 1 | ■ JI Hitahikosan Line | for Tagawa-Gotōji and Soeda |
| 2 | ■ JI Hitahikosan Line | for Jōno and Kokura |

== History ==
The station opened on 25 February 1943. With the privatization of Japanese National Railways (JNR) on 1 April 1987, the station came under the control of JR Kyushu. The station building was demolished in 2014 and replaced with the current compact structure.

== Passenger statistics ==
In fiscal 2020, the station was used by an average of 665 passengers daily (boarding passengers only).

== Surrounding area ==
- Fukuoka Prefectural Route 257
- Shii-no-mori Park

== See also ==
- List of railway stations in Japan
