= Shimo-Kamoo Station =

Railway station in Kama, Fukuoka Prefecture, Japan

JJ 03 Shimo-Kamoo Station 下鴨生駅
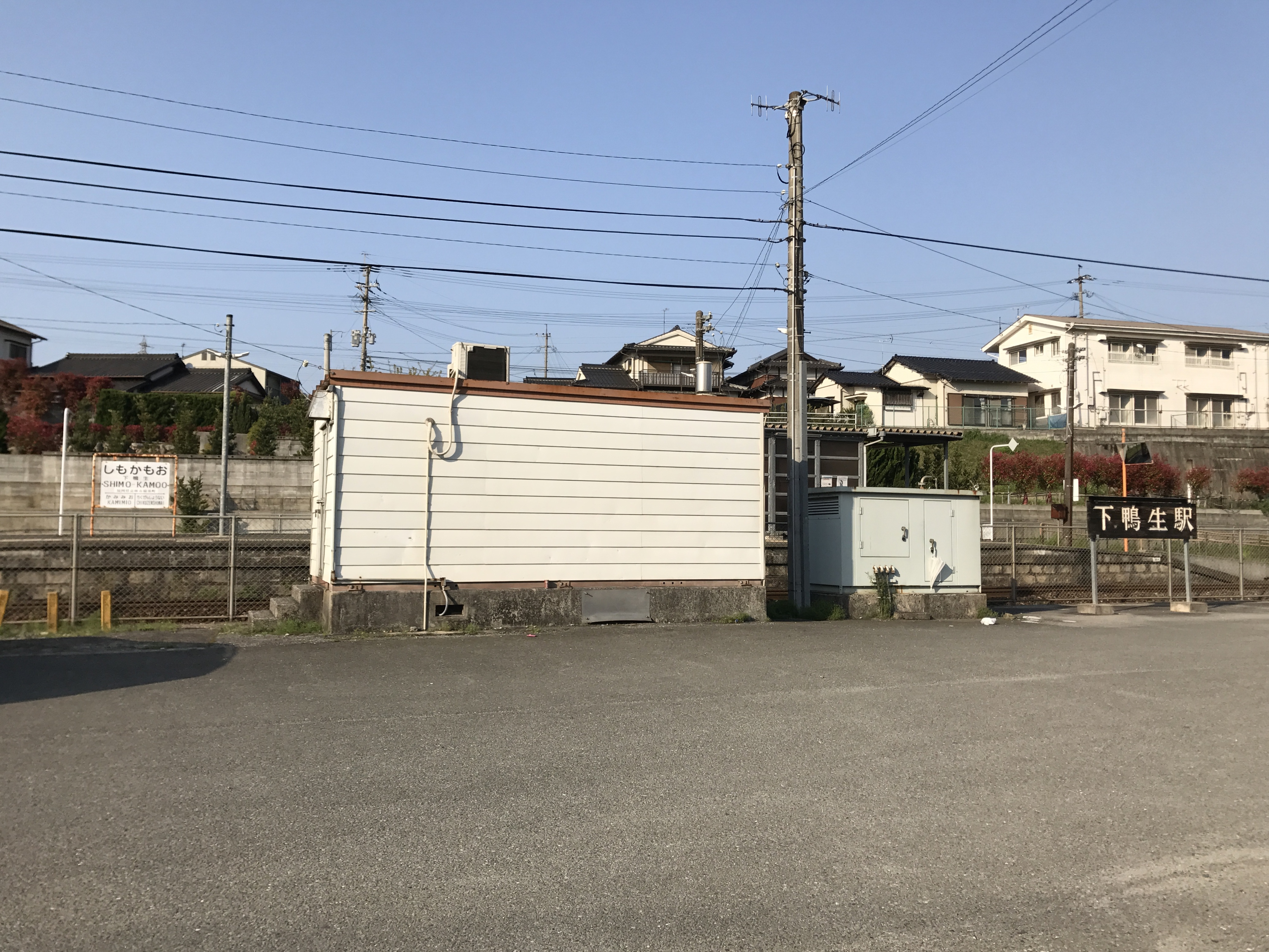
- Shimo-Kamoo Station in April 2017

General information
- Location: 864 Kamoo, Kama-shi, Fukuoka-ken 820-0206; Japan
- Coordinates: 33°36′52.73″N 130°43′42.54″E
- Operator: JR Kyushu
- Line: JJ Gotōji Line
- Distance: 8.3 km from Tagawa-Gotōji
- Platforms: 1 island platform
- Tracks: 2

Other information
- Status: Unstaffed
- Station code: JJ03
- Website: Official website

History
- Opened: 1 February 1916

Services
Preceding station	JR Kyushu	Following station
Chikuzen-Shōnai towards Tagawa-Gotōji	Gotōji Line	Kami-Mio towards Shin-Iizuka
Location
- Location within Fukuoka Prefecture Location within Japan

Shimo-Kamoo Station (下鴨生駅, Shimo-Kamoo-eki) is a passenger railway station located in the city of Kama, Fukuoka Prefecture, Japan. It is operated by JR Kyushu.

== Lines ==
Shimo-Kamoo Station is served by the Gotōji Line and is located 8.3 km from the starting point of the line at Tagawa-Gotōji.

== Layout ==
The station consists of one island platform serving two tracks connected to the station building by a level crossing. The station is unattended.

=== Platforms ===
1	■ JJ Gotōji Line	for Tagawa-Gotōji
2	■ JJ Gotōji Line	for Shin-Iizuka

== History ==
The station was opened on February 1, 1916, as Akasaka Station (赤坂駅) for freight only operations on the Chikuho Main Line. Passenger services began on May 10, 1920, and the line was renamed the Urushi Line. It was incorporated into the Gotōji Line on July 1, 1943. The station was renamed to its present name on December 20, 1956. With the privatization of Japanese National Railways (JNR), the successor of JGR, on 1 April 1987, the station came under the control of JR Kyushu.

== Surrounding area ==
- Fukuoka Prefectural Route 402 Iizuka Yamada Line
- Former Mitsui Mine Yamano Coal Mine Botayama

== See also ==
- List of railway stations in Japan
