= Chikuzen-Uchino Station =

Railway station in Iizuka, Fukuoka Prefecture, Japan

JG 03 Chikuzen-Uchino Station 筑前内野駅
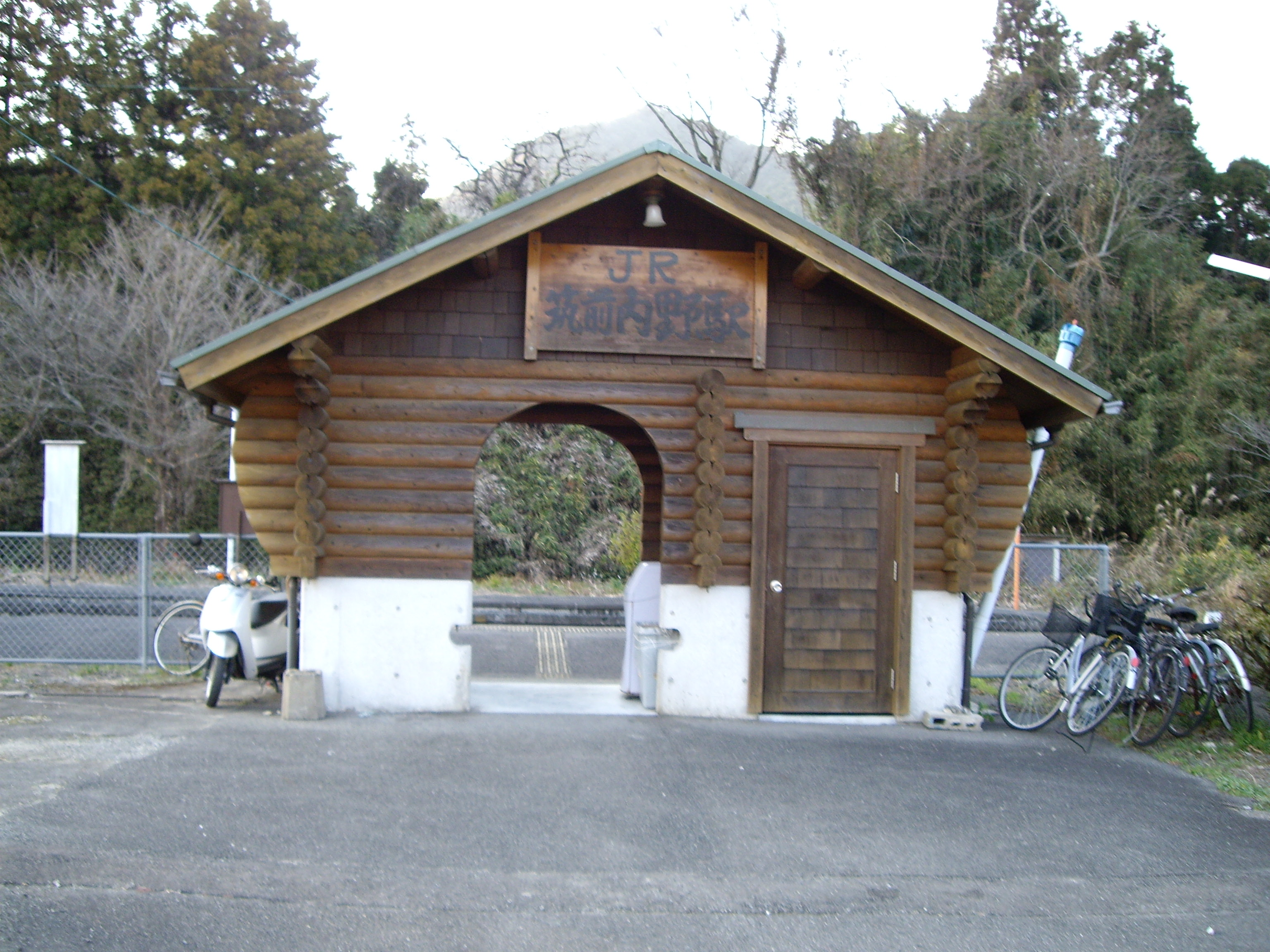
- Chikuzen-Uchino Station in 2007

General information
- Location: Uchino, Iizuka-shi, Fukuoka-ken 820-0706; Japan
- Coordinates: 33°32′24″N 130°38′17″E
- Operator: JR Kyushu
- Line: JG Chikuhō Main Line
- Distance: 51.2 km from Wakamatsu
- Platforms: 1 side platform
- Tracks: 1 + 1 siding

Construction
- Structure type: At grade
- Accessible: Yes - no steps needed to access platform

Other information
- Status: Unstaffed
- Website: Official website

History
- Opened: 15 July 1928

Passengers
- FY2016: 22

Services
Preceding station	JR Kyushu	Following station
Chikuzen-Yamae JG 04 towards Haruda	Chikuhō Main Line (Haruda Line)	Kami-Honami JG 02 towards Keisen
Location
- Location within Fukuoka Prefecture Location within Japan

Chikuzen-Uchino Station (筑前内野駅, Chikuzen-Uchino-eki) is a passenger railway station located in the city of Iizuka, Fukuoka Prefecture, Japan. It is operated by JR Kyushu.

== Lines ==
The station is served by the Chikuhō Main Line and is located 51.2 km (31.8 mi) from the starting point of the line at Wakamatsu.

== Station layout ==
The station, which is unstaffed, consists of a side platform serving a single track. Across the track can be seen another, disused side platform as well as the track bed of a second track which has since been removed. A siding branches off the track and ends behind the platform and is used by track maintenance equipment. A small station building built in a loghouse style serves as a waiting room. A separate weather shelter is provided on the platform itself.

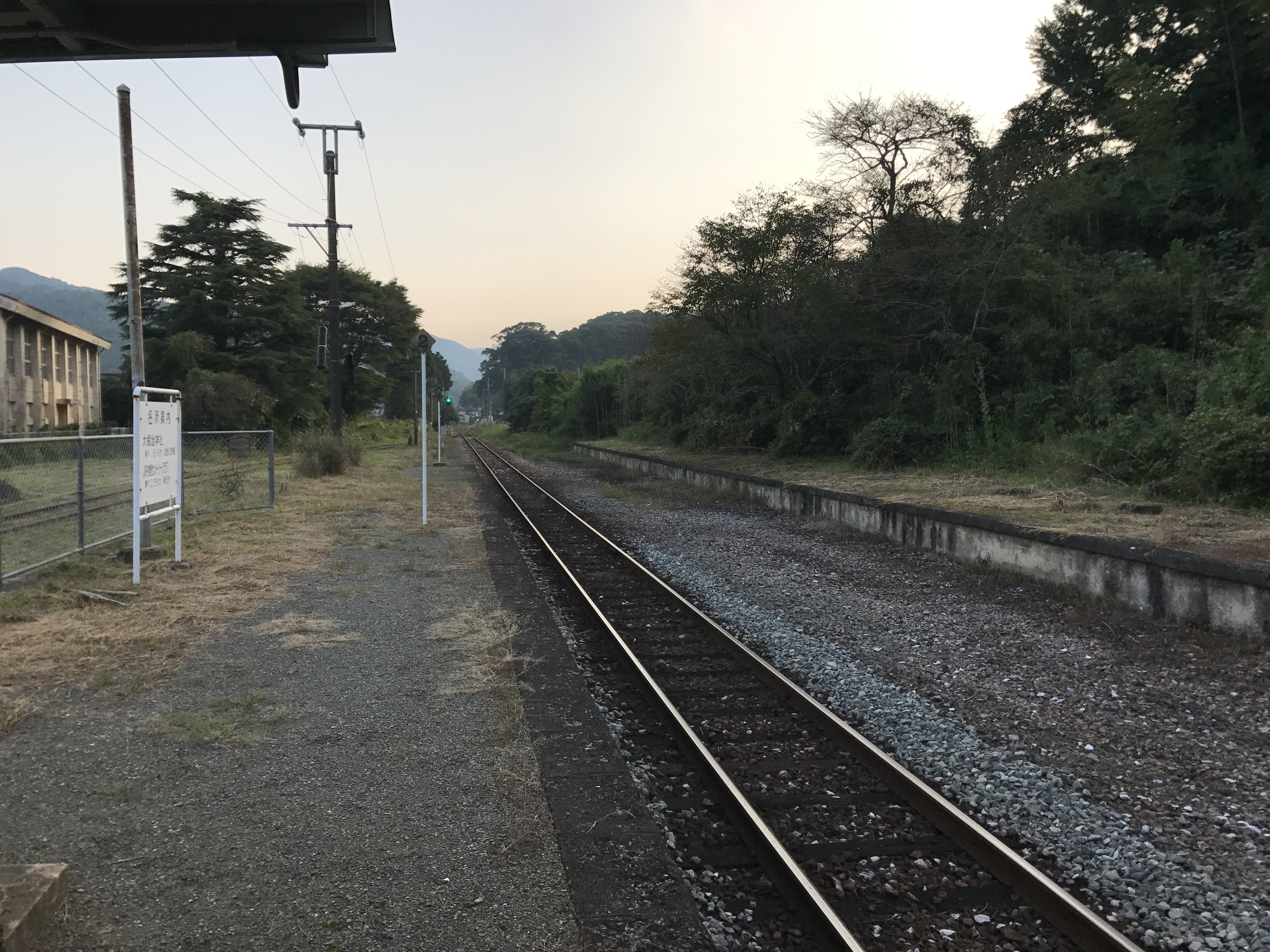
Station platform and track looking in the direction of Haruda. Note the disused platform and former track bed to the right. The siding can be seen to the left.

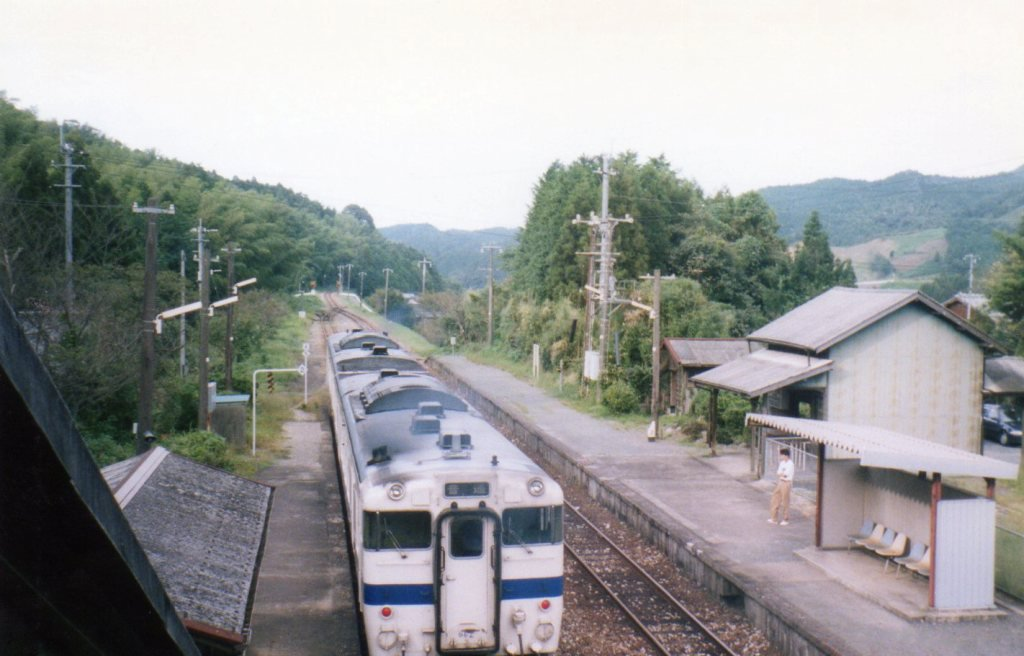
The station in 1996, when it had two platforms and two tracks. Note the old station building.

== History ==
Japanese Government Railways (JGR) opened the station on 15 July 1928 as the new southern terminus of the then Nagao Line from Nagao (now Keisen). On 7 December 1929, Chikuzen-Uchino became a through station when the track was further extended to Haruda. On the same day, the Nagao Line was merged and became part of the Chikuho Main Line. With the privatization of Japanese National Railways (JNR), the successor of JGR, on 1 April 1987, control of the station passed to JR Kyushu.

Station numbering was introduced on 28 September 2018 with Chikuzen-Uchino being assigned station number JG03.

== Surrounding area ==
The station is in the southern part of Iizuka City and is located at a high altitude near the Reisui Pass. Japan National Route 200 runs parallel to the Chikuho Main Line about 200 meters east of the station. The area south of the station flourished as a post town on the Nagasaki Kaido during the Edo period, and is dotted with private houses, but there are no commercial facilities in the area around the station.

== See also ==
- List of railway stations in Japan
