= Shin-Iizuka Station =

Railway station in Iizuka, Fukuoka Prefecture, Japan

JC 14 JJ 01 Shin-Iizuka Station 新飯塚駅
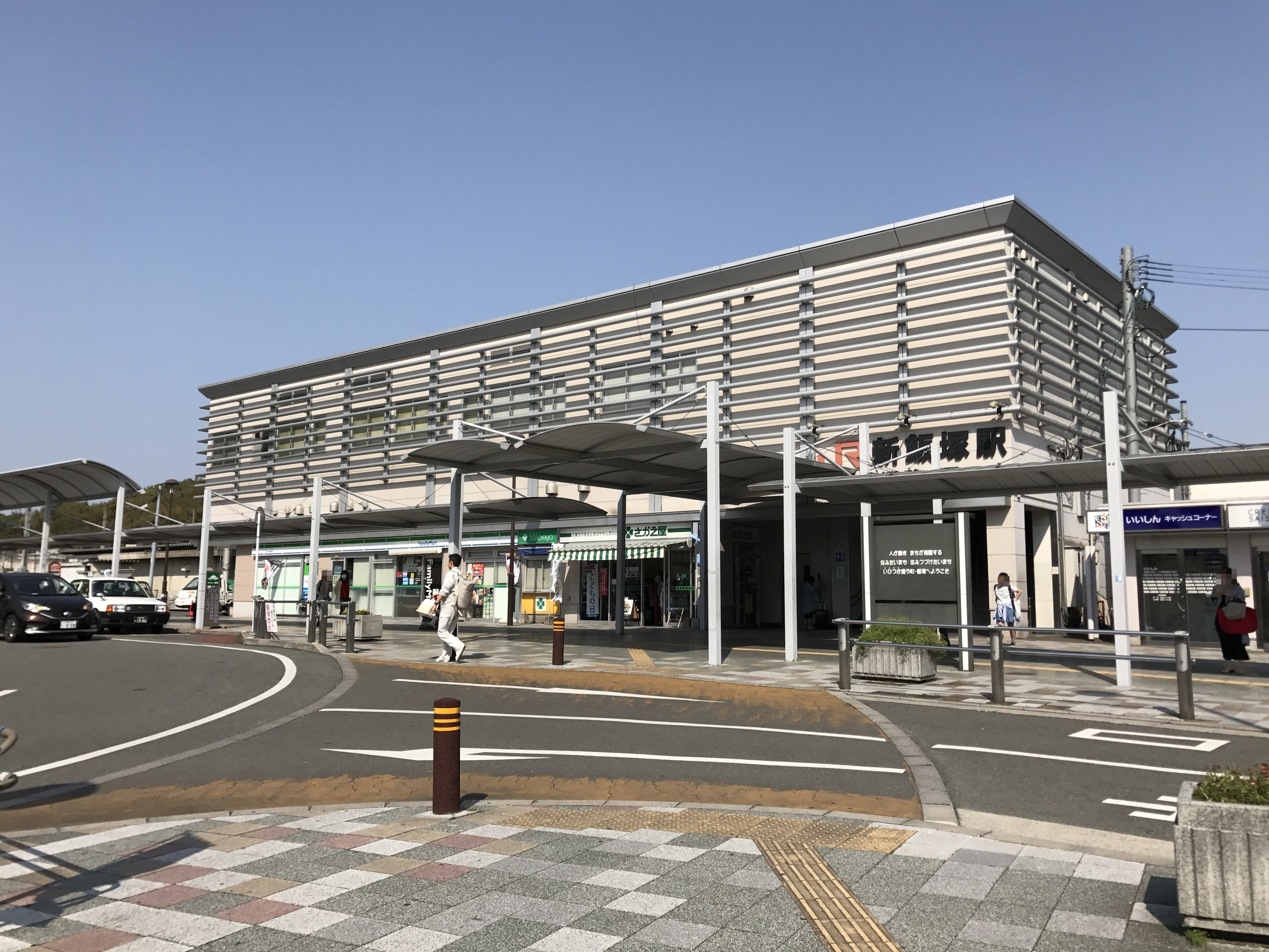
- Shin-Iizuka Station in April 2017

General information
- Location: 931-1 Tateiwa, Iizuka-shi, Fukuoka-ken; Japan
- Coordinates: 33°38′39″N 130°41′39″E
- Operator: JR Kyushu
- Line: JC Chikuhō Main Line JJ Gotōji Line
- Distance: 34.7 km from Wakamatsu
- Platforms: 1 side + 1 island
- Tracks: 3

Other information
- Status: Staffed (Midori no Madoguchi)
- Station code: JC14, JJ1
- Website: Official website

History
- Opened: 15 June 1902
- Former names: Yoshio (to 1935)

Passengers
- FY2020: 2994 daily
- Rank: 54th (among JR Kyushu stations)

Services
Preceding station	JR Kyushu	Following station
Iizuka JC 13 towards Haruda	Chikuhō Main Line Local	Urata JC 15 towards Wakamatsu
Kami-Mio JJ 02 towards Tagawa-Gotōji	Gotōji Line Local	Terminus
Location
- Location within Fukuoka Prefecture Location within Japan

Shin-Iizuka Station (新飯塚駅, Shin-Iizuka-eki) is a junction passenger railway station located in the city of Iizuka, Fukuoka, Japan. It is operated by Kyushu Railway Company (JR Kyushu).

== Lines ==
Shin-Iizuka Station is served by the Chikuhō Main Line and is located 34.7 km from the starting point of the line at Wakamatsu. It is also the western terminus of the 13.3 kilometer Gotōji Line to Tagawa-Gotōji.

== Station layout ==
The station consists of one side platform and one island platform connected by an elevated station building. The station has a Midori no Madoguchi staffed ticket office.

=== Platforms ===
1	■ JC Chikuhō Main Line	for Nōgata and Orio
2	■ JC Chikuhō Main Line	for Keisen and Hakata
3	■ JJ Gotōji Line	for Tagawa-Gotōji

== History ==
The privately run Chikuho Kogyo Railway had opened a track from Wakamatsu to Nōgata on 30 August 1891 and after several phases of expansion, the track had reached Iizuka by 1893. On 1 October 1897, the Chikuho Kogyo Railway, now renamed the Chikuho Railway, merged with the Kyushu Railway which undertook further expansion so that the track had reached Nagao (now Keisen by 1901. On 15 June 1902, Shin-Iizuka was opened with the name Yoshio Station (芳雄駅) as an additional station on the track for freight only. After the Kyushu Railway was nationalized on 1 July 1907, Japanese Government Railways (JGR) took over control of the station. On 12 October 1909, the station became part of the Chikuho Main Line. On 10 May 1920, JGR upgraded Yoshio to a general station for both freight and passenger traffic. On 1 February 1935, the name of the station was changed to Shin-Iizuka. With the privatization of Japanese National Railways (JNR), the successor of JGR, on 1 April 1987, control of the station passed to JR Kyushu.

== Passenger statistics ==
In fiscal 2020, the station was used by a daily average of 2994 boarding passengers, making it the 54th busiest station on the JR Kyushu network.。

== Surrounding area ==
- Iizuka City Hall
- Fukuoka Prefecture Iizuka General Government Building
- Kindai University Faculty of Industrial Science and Engineering
- Kinki University Fukuoka High School
- Iizuka Hospital

== See also ==
- List of railway stations in Japan
