= Tagawa-Gotōji Station =

Railway station in Tagawa, Fukuoka Prefecture, Japan

JI 14 JJ 06 Tagawa-Gotōji Station 田川後藤寺駅
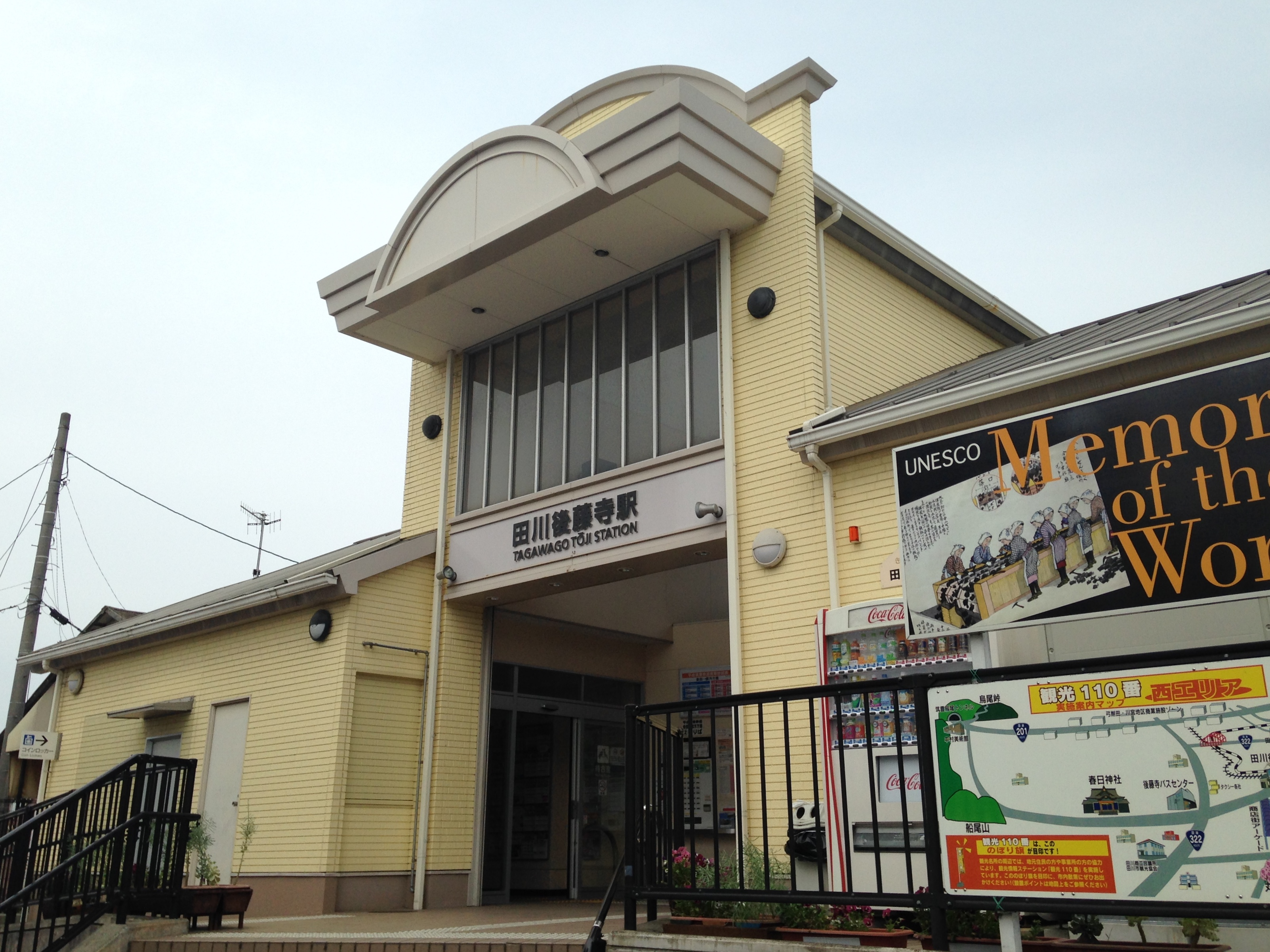
- Tagawa-Gotōji Station in May 2016

General information
- Other names: MrMax Tagawa-Gotōji Station
- Location: 1829 Nara, Tagawa-shi, Fukuoka-ken 826-0042; Japan
- Coordinates: 33°37′49″N 130°48′00″E
- Operator: JR Kyushu Heisei Chikuhō Railway
- Lines: JI Hitahikosan Line JJ Gotōji Line ■ Itoda Line
- Distance: 30.0 km from Jōno
- Platforms: 1 side + 1 island + 1 bay platform
- Tracks: 5

Other information
- Status: Staffed ( Midori no Madoguchi)
- Station code: JI14, JJ06, HC55
- Website: Official website (JR Kyushu); Official website (Heisei Chikuhō Railway)

History
- Opened: 5 February 1896
- Former names: Gotōji (to 1982)

Services
Preceding station	JR Kyushu	Following station
Ikejiri towards Yoake	Hitahikosan Line	Tagawa-Ita towards Kokura
Terminus	Gotōji Line	Funao towards Shin-Iizuka
Preceding station	Heisei Chikuhō Railway	Following station
Ōyabu towards Kanada	Itoda Line	Terminus
Location
- Location within Fukuoka Prefecture Location within Japan

Tagawa-Gotōji Station (田川後藤寺駅, Tagawa-Gotōji-eki) is a junction passenger railway station located in the city of Tagawa, Fukuoka Prefecture, Japan. It is operated jointly by the Kyushu Railway Company (JR Kyushu) by the third-sector railway operator Heisei Chikuhō Railway. On 1 April 2009, discount shop chain MrMax acquired naming rights to the Heisei Chikuhō part of the station. Therefore, the station is alternatively known as MrMax Tagawa-Gotōji Station (MrMax田川後藤寺駅, Misutā-Makkusu-Tagawa-Gotōji-eki).

== Lines ==
Tagawa-Gotōji Station is served by the Hitahikosan Line and is 30.0 kilometers from the starting point of that line at Jōno. It is also the terminus for the 13.3 kilometer Gotōji Line to Shin-Iizuka. On the Heisei Chikuhō Railway Itoda Line, it is 6.8 kilometers from the terminus the line at Kanada..

== Layout ==
The station consists of one side platform and one island platform and one side platform with a notch cutout to all the total of three platforms to serve five tracks. The platforms are accessed by footbridges, and as there are no elevators, the platforms are not barrier-free. The station building is a one-story steel frame building that was renovated in 1997, and contains a Midori no Madoguchi staffed ticket office.The ticket gates are shared by both companies and are staffed by JR employees.

=== Platforms ===
0,1	■ JJ Gotōji Line	for Shimo-Kamoo and Shin-Iizuka
1, 3, 4	■ JI Hitahikosan Line	for Kawara and Kokura for Buzen-Kawasaki and Soeda
2	■ ■ Itoda Line	for Nōgata

== History ==
The station was opened on 5 February 1896 as Gotōji Station (後藤寺駅) on the Hōshū Railway. The railway merged with the Kyushu Railway in 1901 and was nationalized in 1907. It was renamed to its present name on 3 November 1982. With the privatization of the JNR on 1 April 1987, the station came under the control of JR Kyushu. The Ita Line was transferred to the Heisei Chikuhō Railway on 1 October 1989.

== Passenger statistics ==
In fiscal 2021, the station was used by an average of 639 passengers daily (boarding passengers only). In 2019, the Heisei Chikuhō Railway portion of the station was used by 440 passengers daily.

== Surrounding area ==
- Tagawa City Hall
- Tagawa City Art Museum

== See also ==
- List of railway stations in Japan
