= Fukuoka Prefectural Assembly =

Parliament of Fukuoka, Japan

The Fukuoka Prefectural Assembly (福岡県議会, Fukuoka-ken Gikai) is the prefectural parliament of Fukuoka Prefecture.

== Members ==
As of 31 October 2019

| Constituency | Members | Party |
|---|---|---|
| Kitakyūshū City Moji Ward | Kōichi Kawabata | LDP Kengidan |
| Kitakyūshū City Moji Ward | Hiroshi Morishita | NKP |
| Kitakyūshū City Kokurakita Ward | Hiroshi Harada | Minshu Kensei Kengidan |
| Kitakyūshū City Kokurakita Ward | Yoshirō Iki | NKP |
| Kitakyūshū City Kokurakita Ward | Akihiko Nakamura | LDP Kengidan |
| Kitakyūshū City Kokuraminami Ward | Mamoru Ninomiya | NKP |
| Kitakyūshū City Kokuraminami Ward | Nahoko Takase | JCP |
| Kitakyūshū City Kokuraminami Ward | Haruka Yoshimura | LDP Kengidan |
| Kitakyūshū City Wakamatsu Ward | Masayuki Nakao | LDP Kengidan |
| Kitakyūshū City Wakamatsu Ward | Kōichi Yamamoto | Minshu Kensei Kengidan |
| Kitakyūshū City Yahatahigashi Ward | Kōji Tsuda | LDP Kengidan |
| Kitakyūshū City Yahatanishi Ward | Yoshihiko Agata | LDP Kengidan |
| Kitakyūshū City Yahatanishi Ward | Kazuyoshi Iwamoto | Minshu Kensei Kengidan |
| Kitakyūshū City Yahatanishi Ward | Tōshō Matsuo | LDP Kengidan |
| Kitakyūshū City Yahatanishi Ward | Masaharu Matsushita | NKP |
| Kitakyūshū City Tobata Ward | Tokuji Tomita | Minshu Kensei Kengidan |
| Fukuoka City Higashi Ward | Hirōmi Chō | LDP Kengidan |
| Fukuoka City Higashi Ward | Kyū Imahayashi | LDP Kengidan |
| Fukuoka City Higashi Ward | Katsutoshi Ōtsuka | NKP |
| Fukuoka City Higashi Ward | Tōru Sasaki | Minshu Kensei Kengidan |
| Fukuoka City Higashi Ward | Yumi Tachikawa | JCP |
| Fukuoka City Hakata Ward | Hiroyuki Inoue | LDP Kengidan |
| Fukuoka City Hakata Ward | Masanari Takahashi | NKP |
| Fukuoka City Hakata Ward | Kaname Tsutsumi | Minshu Kensei Kengidan |
| Fukuoka City Chūō Ward | Masashi Haranaka | Minshu Kensei Kengidan |
| Fukuoka City Chūō Ward | Kazuhiko Ryū | LDP Kengidan |
| Fukuoka City Chūō Ward | Yasuhiro Take | Takushikai |
| Fukuoka City Minami Ward | Tatsuya Hamasaki | NKP |
| Fukuoka City Minami Ward | Akira Higuchi | LDP Kengidan |
| Fukuoka City Minami Ward | Kunio Kaji | LDP Kengidan |
| Fukuoka City Minami Ward | Kyōko Ōta | Minshu Kensei Kengidan |
| Fukuoka City Jōnan Ward | Masato Moriya | Minshu Kensei Kengidan |
| Fukuoka City Jōnan Ward | Eiji Mutō | LDP Shinshikai |
| Fukuoka City Sawara Ward | Chū Furukawa | Shinseikai |
| Fukuoka City Sawara Ward | Kaori Gotō | Minshu Kensei Kengidan |
| Fukuoka City Sawara Ward | Masahiko Shinkai | NKP |
| Fukuoka City Nishi Ward | Genki Nieda | Minshu Kensei Kengidan |
| Fukuoka City Nishi Ward | Takashi Nohara | LDP Kengidan |
| Fukuoka City Nishi Ward | Hisaya Tanaka | LDP Kengidan |
| Ōmuta City | Toshihiko Egawa | Ryokuyūkai |
| Ōmuta City | Katsumi Ōhashi | Minshu Kensei Kengidan |
| Kurume City | Fumiko Arai | Minshu Kensei Kengidan |
| Kurume City | Yoshiaki Eguchi | Ryokuyūkai |
| Kurume City | Kensei Haraguchi | LDP Kengidan |
| Kurume City | Daiga Jūnaka | LDP Kengidan |
| Kurume City | Nobuhiro Yoshida | NKP |
| Nōgata City | Katsuji Kōhara | LDP Kengidan |
| Iizuka City and Kaho District | Hideyuki Etō | LDP Kengidan |
| Iizuka City and Kaho District | Yoshihiko Takahashi | Seigikai |
| Tagawa City | Makoto Sasaki | Minshu Kensei Kengidan |
| Yanagawa City | Tokuhiro Kabashima | Ryokuyūkai |
| Yame City and District | Kazuhisa Kiriake | LDP Kengidan |
| Yame City and District | Toshiko Noda | Jiseikai |
| Chikugo City | Isao Kurauchi | LDP Kengidan |
| Ōkawa City and Mizuma District | Shōji Akita | LDP Kengidan |
| Yukuhashi City | Daisuke Hori | Ryokuyūkai |
| Nakama City | Seiji Kataoka | LDP Kengidan |
| Ogōri City and Mii District | Tadatoshi Inoue | Ryokuyūkai |
| Chikushino City | Iwami Haratake | Minshu Kensei Kengidan |
| Chikushino City | Kazumi Hirai | LDP Kengidan |
| Kasuga City | Yoshimitsu Matsuo | LDP Kengidan |
| Kasuga City | Shinji Nakamuta | LDP Kengidan |
| Ōnojō City | Hirotaka Inoue | Minshu Kensei Kengidan |
| Ōnojō City | Jungo Inoue | LDP Kengidan |
| Munakata City | Masafumi Inoue | LDP Kengidan |
| Munakata City | Kunihiko Yoshitake | Ryokuyūkai |
| Dazaifu City | Miho Watanabe | Minshu Kensei Kengidan |
| Koga City | Ken'ichirō Yoshida | LDP Kengidan |
| Fukutsu City | Kōichi Yoshida | Fukujinkai |
| Ukiha City | Seiji Ogawa | Ryokuyūkai |
| Miyawaka City and Kurate District | Hidetoshi Shiokawa | LDP Kengidan |
| Kama City | Shōichi Egashira | LDP Kengidan |
| Asakura City and District | Wataru Kurihara | LDP Kengidan |
| Asakura City and District | Reiko Nakashima | Minshu Kensei Kengidan |
| Miyama City | Satoshi Itahashi | LDP Kengidan |
| Itoshima City | Toshimaru Kawasaki | Minshu Kensei Kengidan |
| Itoshima City | Isao Ura | LDP Kengidan |
| Nakagawa City | Katsumasa Watanabe | LDP Kengidan |
| Kasuya District | Kōji Nishio | NKP |
| Kasuya District | Yoshiyuki Tominaga | Minshu Kensei Kengidan |
| Kasuya District | Motoaki Yoshimatsu | LDP Kengidan |
| Onga District | Hirohiko Abe | Ryokuyūkai |
| Onga District | Kunihiro Matsumoto | LDP Kengidan |
| Tagawa District | Satoshi Kōzaki | Ryokuyūkai |
| Tagawa District | Michihito Ōshima | LDP Kengidan |
| Miyako-District | Shigehiro Hatanaka | Minshu Kensei Kengidan |
| Chikujō District and Buzen City | Ken Nishimoto | LDP Kengidan |
