= Fukuoka 5th district =

- Parliamentary constituency for the Japanese House of Representatives
- Numbered map of the Fukuoka Prefecture single seats
- Prefecture: Fukuoka
- Proportional District: Kyushu
- Electorate: 455,338

Current constituency
- Created: 1994
- Seats: One
- Party: LDP
- Representatives: Wataru Kurihara
- Municipalities: Part of the ward of Minami-ku of Fukuoka. Cities of Asakura, Chikushino, Dazaifu, Kasuga, Nakagawa and Onojo. District of Asakura.

Fukuoka 5th district (福岡県第5区, Fukuoka-ken dai-goku or simply 福岡5区, Fukuoka-goku) is a single-member constituency of the House of Representatives in the national Diet of Japan located in Fukuoka Prefecture.

== Areas covered ==
=== Since 2022 ===
- Part of Fukuoka city
  - Part of the ward of Minami-ku of Fukuoka.
- Asakura
- Chikushino
- Dazaifu
- Kasuga
- Nakagawa
- Ōnojō
- Asakura District

=== 2017 - 2022 ===
- Part of Fukuoka city
  - Part of the ward of Minami-ku of Fukuoka.
- Asakura
- Chikushino
- Dazaifu
- Kasuga
- Ōnojō
- Asakura District
- Chikushi District

=== 2013 - 2017 ===
- Asakura
- Chikushino
- Dazaifu
- Kasuga
- Nakagawa
- Ōnojō
- Asakura District
- Chikushi District

=== 1994 - 2013 ===
- Amagi
- Chikushino
- Dazaifu
- Kasuga
- Ōnojō
- Asakura District
- Chikushi District

== List of representatives ==
Election	Representative	Party	Notes
1996	Yoshiaki Harada	LDP	
2000	Yoshiaki Harada	LDP	
2003	Yoshiaki Harada	LDP	
2005	Yoshiaki Harada	LDP	
2009	Daizo Kusuda	Democratic	
2012	Yoshiaki Harada	LDP	
2014	Yoshiaki Harada	LDP	
2017	Yoshiaki Harada	LDP	
2021	Kaname Tsutsumi	CDP	
2024	Wataru Kurihara	LDP	
2026	Wataru Kurihara	LDP	

== Election results ==
=== 2026 ===
2026
Party	Candidate	Votes	%	±%
LDP	Wataru Kurihara	144,014	57.5	▲14.6
Centrist Reform	Kenichi Kawamoto	52,555	21.0	▼13.0
Sanseitō	Yoshitaka Okabe	32,296	12.9	▲6.5
Social Democratic	Keiko Nasu	21,783	8.7	New
Majority		91,459	36.5	▲27.57
Registered electors		454,291		
Turnout		250,648	57.47	▲1.93
LDP hold				

=== 2024 ===
2024
Party	Candidate	Votes	%	±%
LDP	Wataru Kurihara	105,563	42.88	▼4.03
CDP	Kaname Tsutsumi (Incumbent) (Won PR seat)	83,588	33.95	▼19.14
Ishin	Yoshimitsu Matsuo	23,604	9.59	New
Independent	Taco Kid	17,691	7.19	New
Sanseitō	Yoshitaka Okabe	15,733	6.39	New
Majority		21,975	8.93	
Registered electors		453,985		
Turnout			55.54	▲1.02
LDP gain from CDP				

=== 2021 ===
2021
Party	Candidate	Votes	%	±%
CDP	Kaname Tsutsumi	125,315	53.09	New
LDP	Yoshiaki Harada (Incumbent)	110,706	46.91	▼3.57
Majority		14,609	6.18	
Registered electors		454,493		
Turnout			54.52	▼1.40
CDP gain from LDP				

=== 2017 ===
2017
Party	Candidate	Votes	%	±%
LDP	Yoshiaki Harada (Incumbent)	123,758	50.48	▼3.99
Kibō no Tō	Daizo Kusuda	96,675	39.44	New
JCP	Yōji Tanaka	24,715	10.08	▼0.10
Majority		27,083	11.04	
Registered electors		451,843		
Turnout			55.92	▲3.59
LDP hold				

=== 2014 ===
2014
Party	Candidate	Votes	%	±%
LDP	Yoshiaki Harada (Incumbent)	113,736	54.47	▲7.08
Democratic	Daizo Kusuda	73,805	35.35	▲11.50
JCP	Yōji Tanaka	21,251	10.18	▲5.56
Majority		39,931	19.12	
Registered electors		413,480		
Turnout			52.33	▼7.33
LDP hold				

=== 2012 ===
2012
Party	Candidate	Votes	%	±%
LDP	Yoshiaki Harada	113,155	47.39	▲2.38
Democratic	Daizo Kusuda (Incumbent)	56,940	23.85	▼29.30
Restoration	Toshiyuki Yoshida	46,416	19.44	New
Tomorrow	Shinichi Hamatake	11,213	4.70	New
JCP	Yōji Tanaka	11,068	4.62	N/A
Majority		56,215	23.54	
Registered electors				
Turnout			59.66	
LDP gain from Democratic				

=== 2009 ===
2009
Party	Candidate	Votes	%	±%
Democratic	Daizo Kusuda	148,502	53.15	▲13.14
LDP	Yoshiaki Harada (Incumbent)	125,767	45.01	▼8.26
Happiness Realization	Takunori Ikaruga	5,139	1.84	New
Majority		22,735	8.14	
Registered electors				
Turnout				
Democratic gain from LDP				

=== 2005 ===
2005
Party	Candidate	Votes	%	±%
LDP	Yoshiaki Harada (Incumbent)	139,178	53.27	▲4.94
Democratic	Daizo Kusuda	104,550	40.01	▼2.68
JCP	Naoko Kawachi	17,560	6.72	▲0.85
Majority		34,628	13.26	
Registered electors				
Turnout				
LDP hold				

=== 2003 ===
2003
Party	Candidate	Votes	%	±%
LDP	Yoshiaki Harada (Incumbent)	105,071	48.33	▲5.77
Democratic	Daizo Kusuda (Won PR seat)	81,166	37.33	▲10.71
Social Democratic	Yuriko Matsuzaki	18,419	8.47	New
JCP	Naoko Kawachi	12,756	5.87	▼3.52
Majority		23,905	11.00	
Registered electors				
Turnout				
LDP hold				

=== 2000 ===
2000
Party	Candidate	Votes	%	±%
LDP	Yoshiaki Harada (Incumbent)	93,343	42.56	▼0.69
Democratic	Yuiko Matsumoto	58,392	26.62	New
Liberal League	Kōzō Sato	47,002	21.43	▲8.36
JCP	Hiroko Moriyama	20,608	9.39	▼0.69
Majority		34,951	15.94	
Registered electors				
Turnout				
LDP hold				

=== 1996 ===
1996
Party	Candidate	Votes	%	±%
LDP	Yoshiaki Harada	85,399	43.25	New
New Frontier	Mikito Kusuda	66,353	33.60	New
Liberal League	Kōzō Sato	25,810	13.07	New
JCP	Tamiya Kihara	19,895	10.08	New
Majority		19,046	9.65	
Registered electors				
Turnout				
LDP win (new seat)				
