= Wataru Kurihara =

Japanese politician

- 栗原 渉
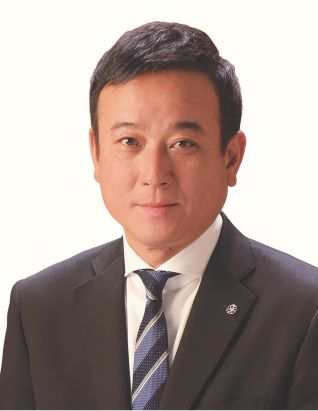
- Official portrait, 2025

Member of the House of Representatives
- Incumbent
- Assumed office 28 October 2024
- Preceded by: Kaname Tsutsumi
- Constituency: Fukuoka 5th

Member of the Fukuoka Prefectural Assembly
- In office April 2010 – 14 October 2021
- Constituency: Asakura & Asakura District

Personal details
- Born: 27 September 1965 (age 61) Amagi, Fukuoka, Japan
- Party: Liberal Democratic
- Education: Tokyo International University
- Website: Wataru Kurihara website

Wataru Kurihara (栗原 渉, Kurihara Wataru; born 27 September 1965) is a Japanese politician of the Liberal Democratic Party, who serves as a member of the House of Representatives.

== Early years ==
Born and raised in Amagi, Fukuoka Prefecture in 1965.

After graduating from Tokyo International University, he served a secretary to Seiichi Ōta from 1990 to 2009.

== Political career ==
In 2010, Kurihara ran for the Fukuoka Prefectural Assembly and was elected for the first time.

On 14 October 2021, Kurihara resigned as a member of the Fukuoka Prefectural Assembly and sought to run for Fukuoka 5th district in the general election. However, instead of promising to nominate Kurihara in the next general election, LDP headquarters nominated incumbent Yoshiaki Harada. Therefore, Kurihara gave up his candidacy. However, Several organizations had already supported Kurihara, leaving a lump with Harada. As a result, Harada lost to CDP's Kaname Tsutsumi and lost re-election.

In the 2024 general election, Kurihara defeated CDP's Tsutsumi and gain Fukuoka 5th's seat.

In the 2025 LDP presidential election, Kurihara endorsed Yoshimasa Hayashi as a recommender.

In 2025, Kurihara was appointed to Parliamentary Secretary for Health, Labour and Welfare in the First Takaichi cabinet.

In the 2026 general election, Kurihara defeated DPP's Kenichi Kawamoto by a large margin and hold the seat. After the election, he was re-appointed to Parliamentary Secretary for Health, Labour and Welfare in the Second Takaichi cabinet.
