= Kaname Tsutsumi =

Japanese politician

- 堤 かなめ

Mayor of Ōnojō
- Incumbent
- Assumed office 12 September 2025
- Preceded by: Muneji Imoto

Member of the House of Representatives
- In office 1 November 2021 – 5 August 2025
- Preceded by: Yoshiaki Harada
- Succeeded by: Keisuke Maruo
- Constituency: Fukuoka 5th (2021–2024); Kyushu PR (2024–2025)

Member of the Fukuoka Prefectural Assembly
- In office 30 April 2011 – 2021
- Constituency: Hakata-ku, Fukuoka

Personal details
- Born: 27 October 1960 (age 65) Dazaifu, Fukuoka, Japan
- Party: Independent
- Other political affiliations: DPJ (2011–2016); DP (2016–2017); CDP (2017–2025)
- Education: Kyushu University
- Website: Kaname Tsutsumi website

Kaname Tsutsumi (堤 かなめ, Tsutsumi Kaname; born 27 October 1960) is a Japanese politician, who serves as a mayor of Ōnojō.

== Early years ==
Born and raised in Dazaifu, Fukuoka Prefecture in 1965.

In March 1983, Tsutsumi graduated from the Faculty of Humanities, Kyushu University.

In March 1991, Tsutsumi completed the Master's program in Sociology at the Graduate School of Humanities, Kyushu University. (Degree: Master of Arts).

From April 1991 to March 1993, Tsutsumi pursued doctoral studies in the same department (but left there without a Ph.D. degree).

In April 1993, Tsutsumi was appointed as a Full-time Lecturer at Kyushu International University. In April 1998, she promoted to associate professor. In April 2001, she promoted to Professor. From 2005 to 2008, she served as a professor at Kyushu Women's University.

As a specialist in gender issues, Tsutsumi dedicated her career to academic research and social activism. Her major initiatives include:

- 1997: Founded the Asian Women's Center, an organization dedicated to supporting women and children who have survived abuse.
- April 2000: Established the Fukuoka Gender Research Institute.

== Political career ==
In the 2010 House of Councillors election, Tsutsumi ran for Fukuoka at-large district as an independent endorsed by DPJ and SDP but lost.

In 2011, Tsutsumi ran for the Fukuoka Prefectural Assembly as a DPJ candidate and was elected for the first time.

In 2015, Tsutsumi was re-elected in the Fukuoka Prefecture Assembly election.

In 2019, Tsutsumi ran for the Fukuoka Prefectural Assembly as a CDP candidate and was re-elected without a vote.

On 17 April 2021, Tsutsumi announced her candidacy for Fukuoka 5th district in the next general election.

In the 2021 general election, Tsutsumi defeated LDP incumbent Yoshiaki Harada party because some organizations which support LDP endorsed Wataru Kurihara, not Harada.

In the 2021 CDP presidential election, Tsutsumi endorsed Seiji Osaka as a recommender.

In the 2024 CDP presidential election, Tsutsumi endorsed Yoshihiko Noda as a recommender.

In the 2024 general election, Tsutsumi lost to LDP's Kurihara and won a seat in Kyushu PR.

On 5 August 2025, Tsutsumi left CDP and resigned as a member of the House of Representatives to be ready for the Ōnojō mayoral election.

On 7 September 2025, Tsutsumi defeated Keiji Itō, endorsed by LDP and Komeito and was elected to the mayor.
