= Suguokamoto Site =

Historic site in Kasuga, Fukuoka, Japan

- 須玖岡本遺跡 (Japanese)
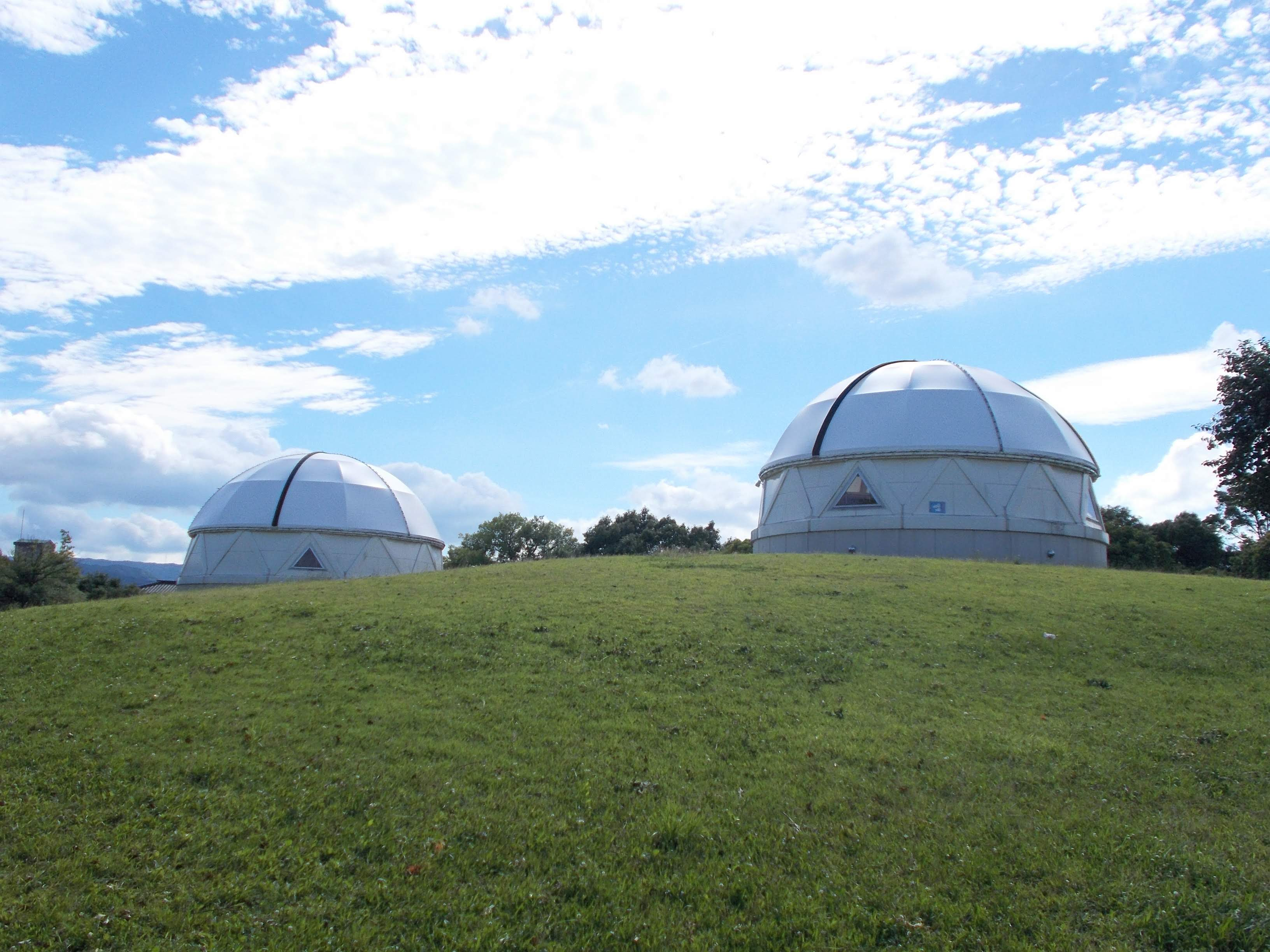
- Suguokamoto Site

- Suguokamoto Site Suguokamoto Site (Japan)
- Interactive map of Suguokamoto Site
- 33°32′17.1″N 130°27′1.8″E
- Periods: Yayoi period
- Location: Kasuga, Fukuoka, Japan
- Region: Kyushu

History
- Built: 1st century

Site notes
- Public access: Yes (park)

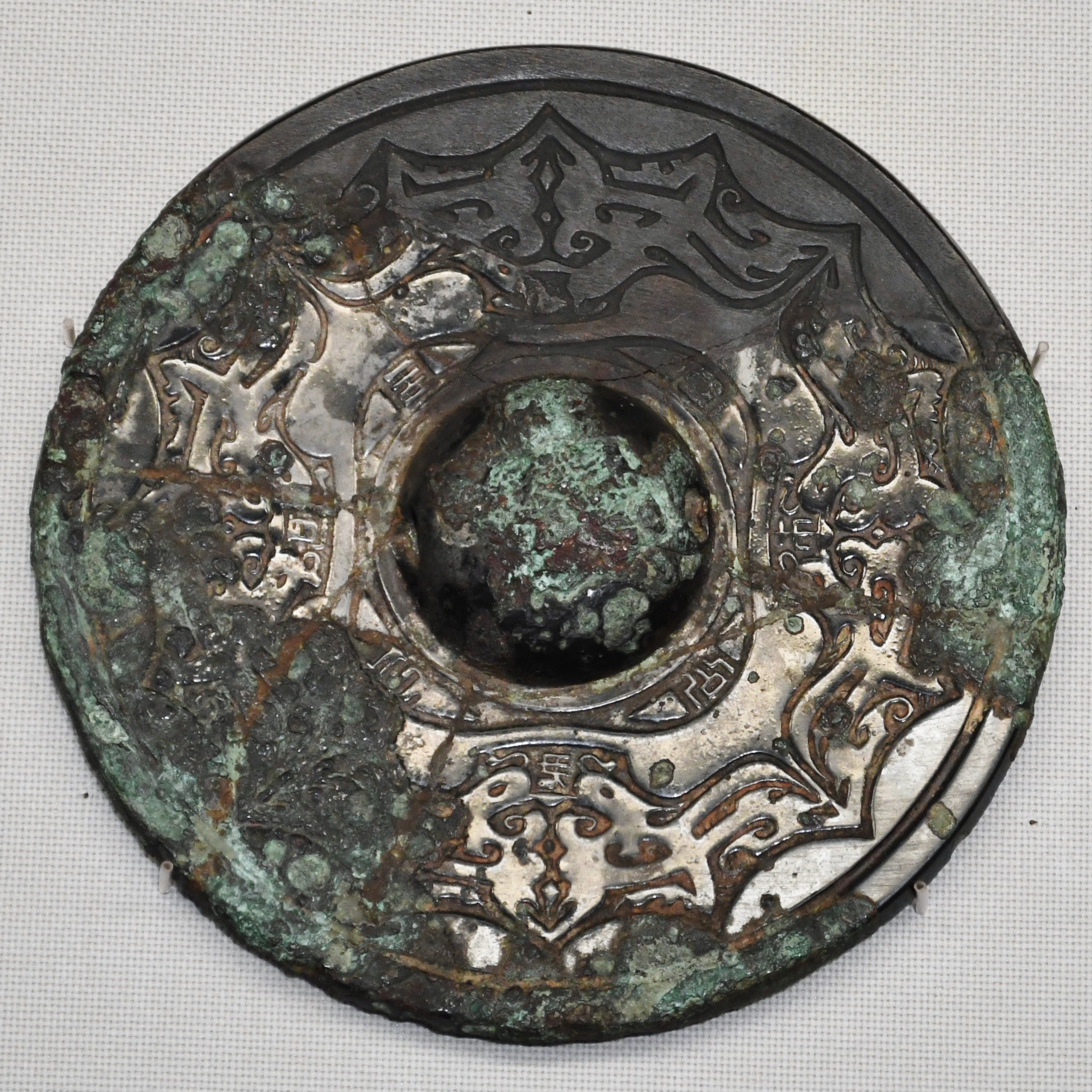
Bronze Mirror from Suguokamoto Site at Tokyo National Museum

The Suguokamoto Site (須玖岡本遺跡) is a Yayoi period cemetery and associated village, located in the Okamoto neighborhood of the city of Kasuga, Fukuoka Prefecture, Japan. The site was designated a National Historic Site of Japan in 1951 as the "Okamoto Site", with the area under protection expanded in 2000 and the name changed to its present designation.

== Overview ==
In the northern part of Kasuga Hills, which stretches to the west of Kasuga City, are a large number of ruins dating back to the Yayoi period. Based on the quality and quantity of ruins and artifacts in this area, it is assumed that this area is the center of the kingdom of Nakoku (奴国, Nakoku, Na-no-Kuni) , which appears in the Book of the Later Han and the Gishi Wajinden (魏志倭人伝; Records of Wei: An Account of the Wa). In 57 CE, Emperor Guangwu of Han granted Nakoku an imperial seal engraved with the Chinese characters 漢委奴國王 (Kan no Wa no Na-no-Koku-ō, "King of the Na state of the Wa (vassal) of Han" which was discovered over 1500 years later, by an Edo period farmer on Shikanoshima Island,

The site has been known since at least the Meiji period. In 1899 a local landowner built a house next to a megalith measuring 3.6 by 2.0 meters, and recorded having to relocate other megaliths during construction, at which time he found a grave and various artifacts, including shards of bronze mirrors.

Archaeological excavations conducted in 1979-80 uncovered 116 pot tombs, nine earthen pit tombs and wooden coffin tombs, and associated ritual remains from the mid-Yayoi period within a radius of 2 kilometers north-to-south and one kilometer east-to-west, centered on the highest point of the site, 36.3 meters above sea level. It is estimated that there are more than 300 graves, including those that were partially destroyed, and the remains of nine pit dwellings were discovered on a slightly lower flat land on the west side, and a mold for a small bronze bell made of gneiss was also unearthed. Some of the jar coffins are accompanied by grave goods such as about 30 bronze mirrors made during China's Western Han Dynasty, glass or jade beads, and magatama, as well as many Yayoi pottery earthenware items. Bronze swords have also been recovered from the wooden coffin tombs and bronze swords and spears from the site of the megalithic grave, is speculated to have originally been a large burial mound similar to that found at the Mikumo-Iwara Site in neighboring Itoshima, Fukuoka, which also had many bronze foundries.

The site has been developed into the Nakuni-no-oka Historical Park, and in the two dome-shaped exhibition halls, where parts of the coffin tombs and ritual remains in their original condition at the time of excavation can be viewed. It is approximately a 20-minute walk from Minami-Fukuoka Station.

== See also ==
- List of Historic Sites of Japan (Fukuoka)
