= Hihaizuka Kofun =

Historic Site in Kasuga, Fukuoka, Japan

- 日拝塚古墳 (Japanese)
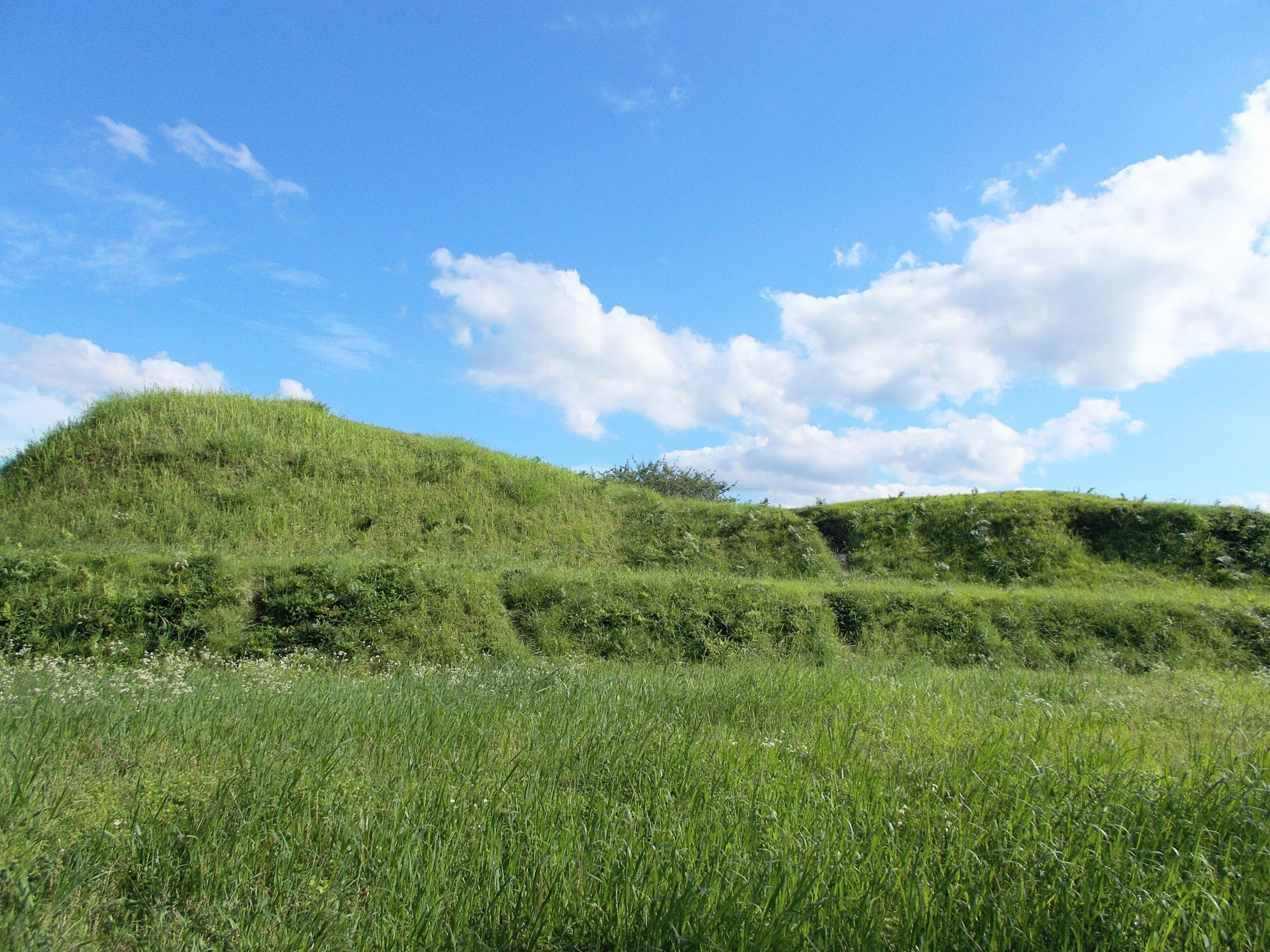
- Hihaizuka Kofun

- Hihaizuka Kofun Hihaizuka Kofun (Japan)
- Interactive map of Hihaizuka Kofun
- 33°31′23″N 130°26′19″E
- Type: Kofun
- Periods: Kofun period
- Location: Kasuga, Fukuoka, Japan
- Region: Kyushu

History
- Built: c.6th century

Site notes
- Public access: Yes (park)

The Hihaizuka Kofun (日拝塚古墳) is a Kofun period burial mound, located in the Shimohirasui Minami neighborhood of the city of Kasuga, Fukuoka Prefecture, Japan. The tumulus was designated a National Historic Site of Japan in 1976.

== Overview ==
The Hihaizuka Kofun is located on a low terrace on the right bank of the Naka River in the Hakata Plain. This area was the center of the Yayoi period Kingdom of Na, which, according to the Book of the Later Han, was granted a gold imperial seal by Emperor Guangwu of Han in 57 CE The kingdom is mentioned in vol. 30 of the Chinese Book of Wei from the Records of the Three Kingdoms, titled "The Account of the Easterners: A Note on the Wa" (Chinese: 東夷傳‧倭人條), indicating that it continued to exist in the 3rd century.

The tumulus is a zenpō-kōen-fun (前方後円墳), which is shaped like a keyhole, having one square end and one circular end, when viewed from above, and is orientated towards the west. It has a total length of 41.2 meters, with a 22-meter diameter posterior circular portion with a height of 5.9 meters and a 34-meter wide anterior rectangular portion with a height of 5.4 meters. The tumulus was built in two stages, and no fukiishi or haniwa discovered. Although it has disappeared now, there was once a moat surrounding it, and the total length including the moat was about 60 meters.

The burial chamber is located in the center of the posterior portion and is a horizontal-entry stone chamber made of granite blocks that opens to the southwest. It is 3.6 by 2.6 meters, and four meters high with a 4.8 meter long passage that is only one meter wide by 1.5 meters high. When excavated in 1929 a large quantity of grave goods were discovered, including a bronze mirror, earring with gold drape, four gold rings and other accessories, and one long iron sword with a ring pommel. Numerous pieces of horse fittings, including three sets of iron ring stirrups, and Sue ware pottery were also found. Based on the characteristics of the tumulus and excavated items, the tumulus was constructed in the 6th century.

Currently, the excavated items are stored at the Tokyo National Museum, and the Nakuni-no-Oka History Museum in Kasuga City preserves earrings with gold pendants. The tumulus is being maintained as a park. It is located approximately a 15-minute walk from Hakataminami Station on the JR Kyushu Hakata Minami Line.

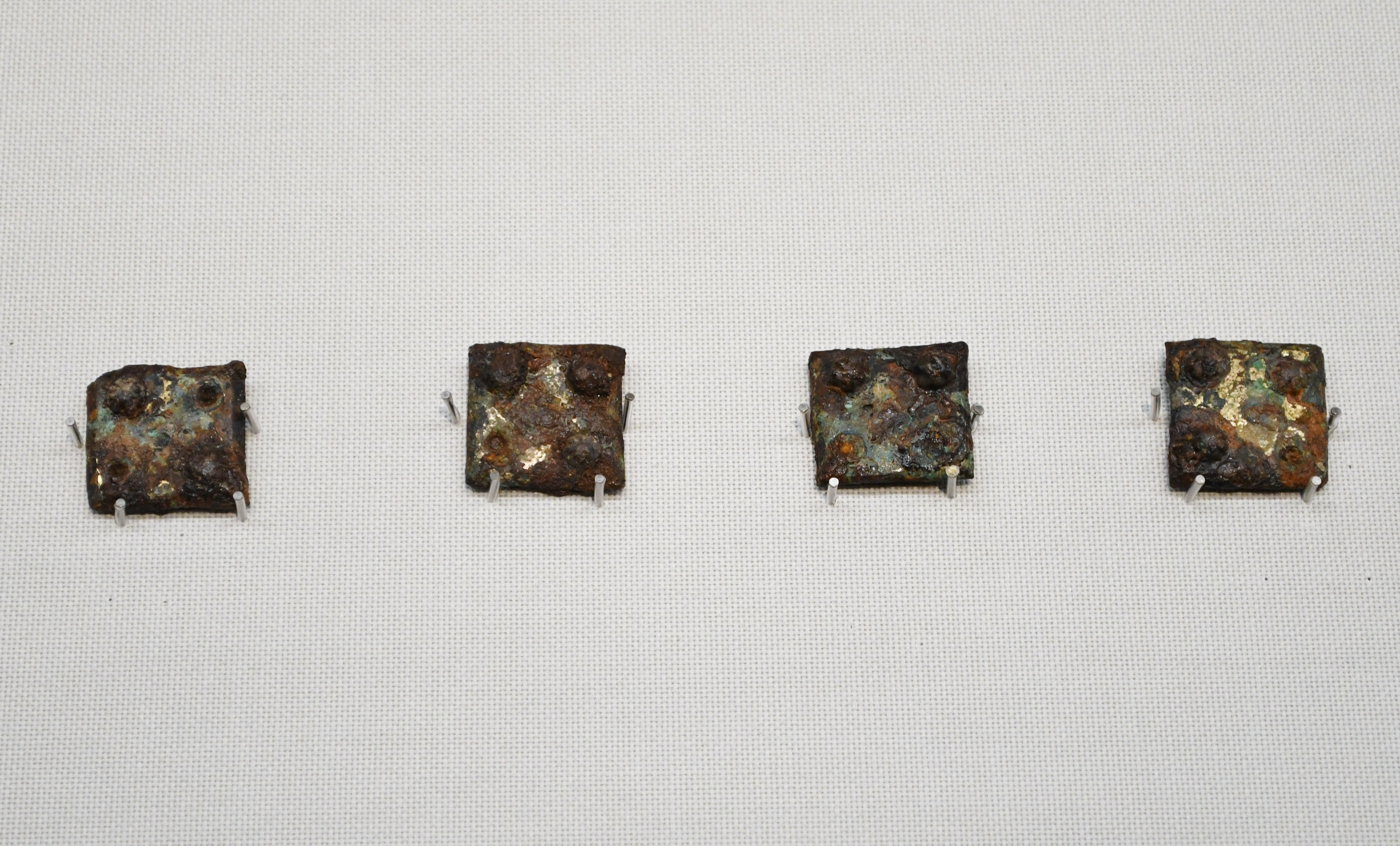
Metal fittings excavated from Hihaizuka Kofun
at Tokyo National Museum

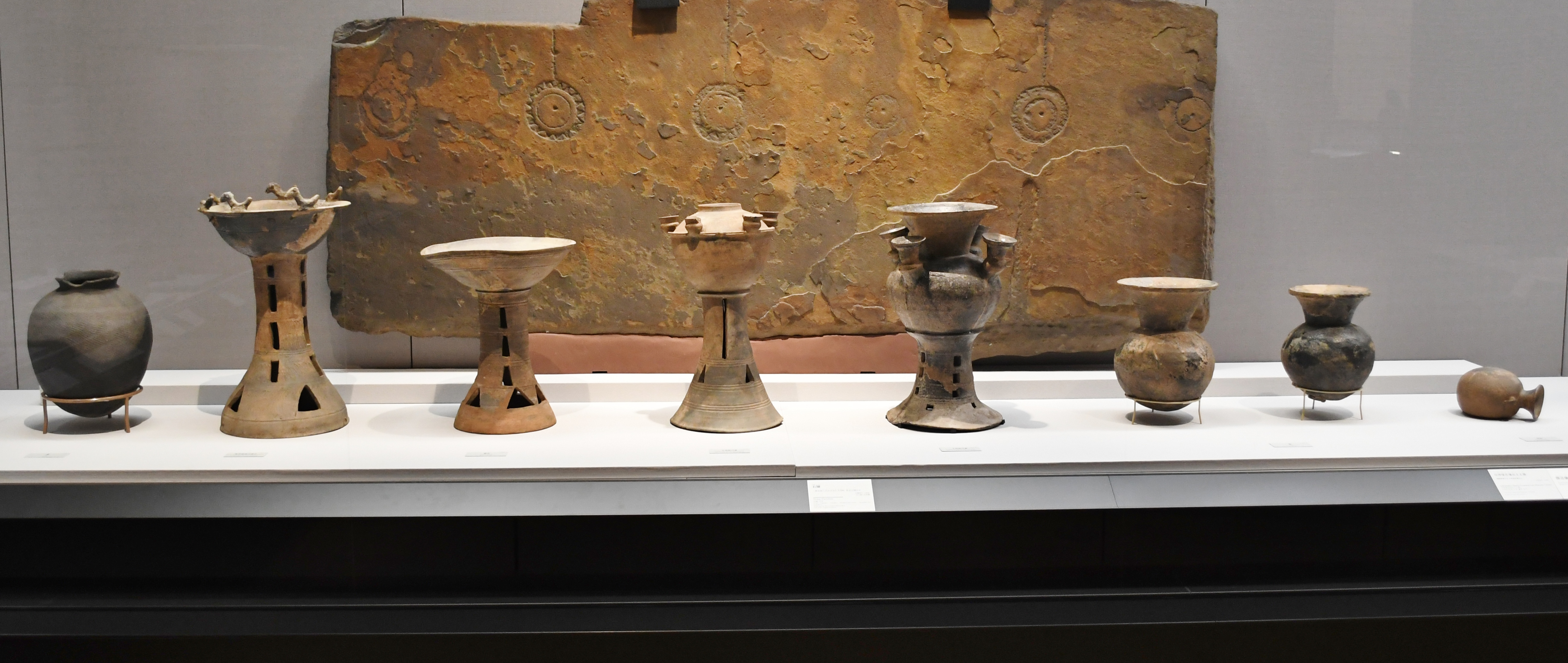
Sue ware excavated from Hihaizuka Kofun
at Tokyo National Museum

== See also ==
- List of Historic Sites of Japan (Fukuoka)
