= Daizo Kusuda =

Japanese politician

- 楠田 大蔵
- Official portrait, 2009

Mayor of Dazaifu
- Incumbent
- Assumed office 29 January 2018
- Preceded by: Shigeru Ashikari

Member of the House of Representatives
- In office 27 December 2006 – 16 November 2012
- Preceded by: Kenji Kitahashi
- Succeeded by: Yoshiaki Harada
- Constituency: Kyushu PR (2006–2009); Fukuoka 5th (2009–2012)
- In office 9 November 2003 – 8 August 2005
- Constituency: Kyushu PR

Personal details
- Born: 20 April 1975 (age 51) Chikushino, Fukuoka, Japan
- Party: Independent
- Other political affiliations: DPJ (2003–2013; 2014–2016); DP (2016–2017); KnT (2017)
- Education: University of Tokyo

Daizo Kusuda (楠田 大蔵, Kusuda Daizō; born 20 April 1975) is a Japanese politician who served as a member of the House of Representatives in the Diet (national legislature) as a member of the Democratic Party of Japan. He was elected for the first time in 2003 and represents the 5th District of Fukuoka prefecture.

He is a native of Chikushino, Fukuoka and graduated from the University of Tokyo.
