= Ōnojō =

Ōnojō 大野城市
- City
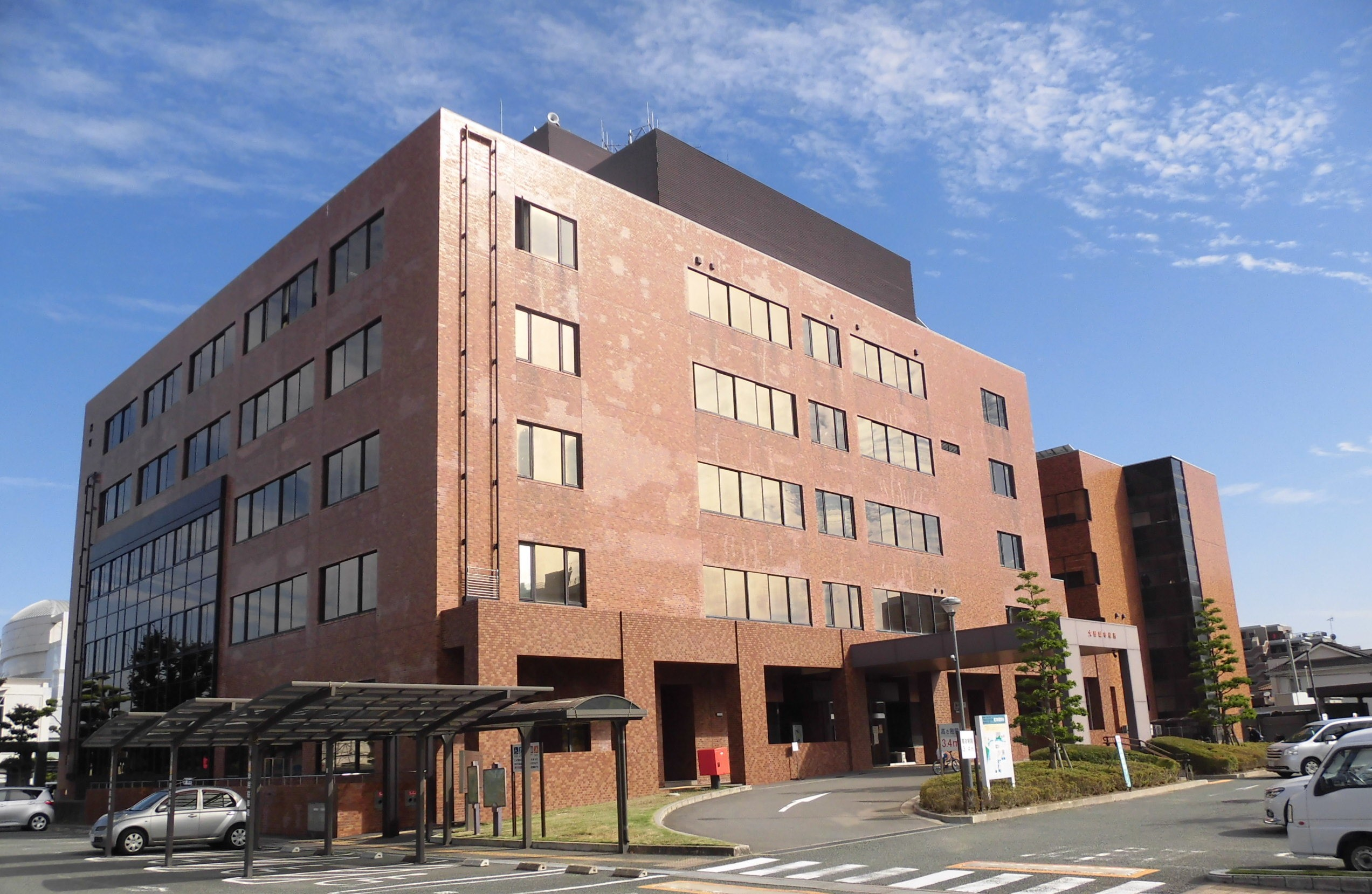
- Ōnojō City Hall

- Flag Emblem
- Location of Ōnojō in Fukuoka Prefecture

- Location in Japan
- Coordinates: 33°32′11″N 130°28′43″E
- Country: Japan
- Region: Kyushu
- Prefecture: Fukuoka

Government
  - Mayor: Kaname Tsutsumi (堤かなめ), from September 2025

Area
  - Total: 26.89 km^{2} (10.38 sq mi)

Population (March 31, 2024)
  - Total: 102,818
  - Density: 3,824/km^{2} (9,903/sq mi)
- Time zone: UTC+09:00 (JST)
- City hall address: 2-2-1, Akebonomachi, Ōnojō-shi, Fukuoka-ken 816-8510
- Website: Official website
- Symbols
- Flower: Chinese bellflower
- Tree: Round leaf holly

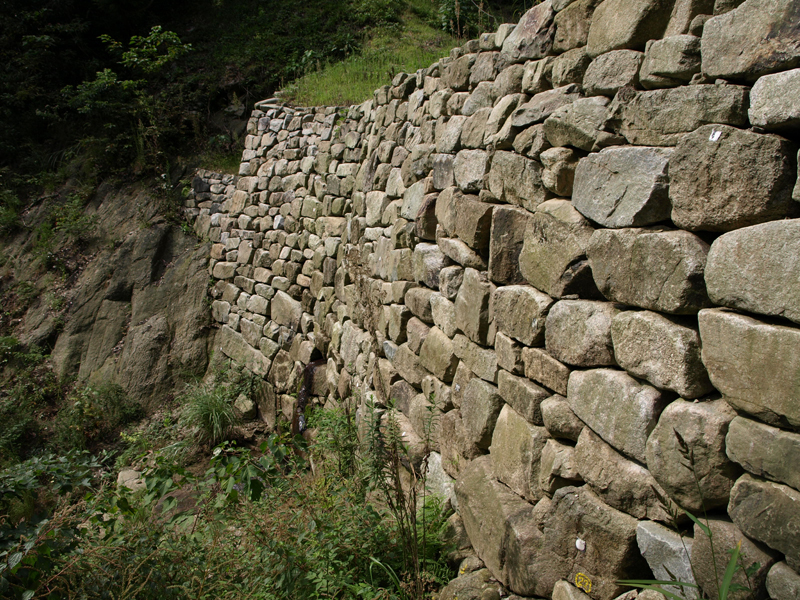
ruins of Ōno Castle

Ōnojō (大野城市, Ōnojō-shi; Japanese pronunciation: [ò̞ó̞.nó̞.(ɟ̟͡)ʑò̞ò̞, -(ɟ̟͡)ʑó̞ò̞.ɕì, ó̞ó̞-]) is an area located in Fukuoka Prefecture, Japan. As of 31 March 2024, the city had an estimated population of 102,818 in 46689 households, and a population density of 3800 persons per km^{2}. The total area of the city is 26.89 km^{2} (10.38 sq mi).

== Geography ==
Ōnojō is located in west-central Fukuoka Prefecture. The city area is long and narrow in the shape of a gourd, and the width of the city center is only about 1 km. It is located to the southeast of Fukuoka City and is a commuter town for the city. The northern and southern parts of the city have mountainous terrain, but are home to new and old residential areas. The Ushikubi River originates from the Ushikubi Dam on Mt. Ushikubiyama in the southern part of the city, and curves through the city limits until it joins the Mikasa River, which runs beside the Shimo-Ori housing complex.Ducks, turtles, koi, egrets, herons and Japanese wagtails can be seen in or around the river, depending on the season.

=== Neighboring municipalities ===
Fukuoka Prefecture

- Chikushino
- Dazaifu
- Fukuoka
- Kasuga
- Nakagawa
- Umi

=== Climate ===
Ōnojō has a humid subtropical climate (Köppen Cfa) characterized by warm summers and cool winters with light to no snowfall. The average annual temperature in Ōnojō is 14.9 °C. The average annual rainfall is 1766 mm with September as the wettest month.

=== Demographics ===
Per Japanese census data, the population of Ōnojō is as shown below

Historical population
| Year | Pop. | ±% |
|---|---|---|
| 1940 | 5,710 | — |
| 1950 | 10,192 | +78.5% |
| 1960 | 15,707 | +54.1% |
| 1970 | 33,818 | +115.3% |
| 1980 | 64,109 | +89.6% |
| 1990 | 75,214 | +17.3% |
| 2000 | 89,414 | +18.9% |
| 2010 | 95,101 | +6.4% |
| 2020 | 102,085 | +7.3% |

== History ==
The area of Ōnojō is located in former Chikuzen Province and has had strong ties with Hakata and Dazaifu since ancient times. The city takes its name from Ōno Castlem which was built in the Asuka Period to protect Daizaifu against possible invasion by Silla and Tang China. Nearby Mizuki Castle also served the same purpose. The city area also has many other ruins, including the Ushikubi Sue Ware Kiln Site, from a time when this area was a major producer of Sue ware pottery. During the Edo Period, it was largely under the control of Fukuoka Domain.

After the Meiji restoration, the village of Ōno was established on May 1, 1889 with the creation of the modern municipalities system. It was raised to town status on October 10, 1951 and changed its name to Ōnojō on being raised to city status on April 1, 1972.

== Government ==
Ōnojō has a mayor-council form of government with a directly elected mayor and a unicameral city council of 20 members. Ōnojō contributes two members to the Fukuoka Prefectural Assembly. In terms of national politics, the city is part of the Fukuoka 5th district of the lower house of the Diet of Japan.

== Economy ==
Ōnojō is largely a commuter town for Fukuoka City, with almost half the full-time residents of the city commuting to work or school within Fukuoka City, daily. The city also is a commercial center and has light manufacturing. At the beginning of the 21st century the area has seen continued real estate development partly due to good infrastructure, unlike more rural parts of the prefecture. The retailers Seiyu Group and Aeon have stores in the area, as do several conbini chains. Central Ōnojō is on the flight path to Fukuoka airport, so noise pollution can be a problem.

== Education ==
Ōnojō has ten public elementary schools and five public junior high schools operated by the city government and one public high schools operated by the Fukuoka Prefectural Board of Education. There is also one private high school. Kyushu University's Gratduate School is located in the city.

== Transportation ==
=== Railways ===
JR Kyushu - Kagoshima Main Line

JA Ōnojō - Mizuki

Nishitetsu Nishitetsu Tenjin Ōmuta Line

- Shirakibaru - Shimoōri

=== Highways ===
- Kyushu Expressway
- National Route 3

== Local attractions ==
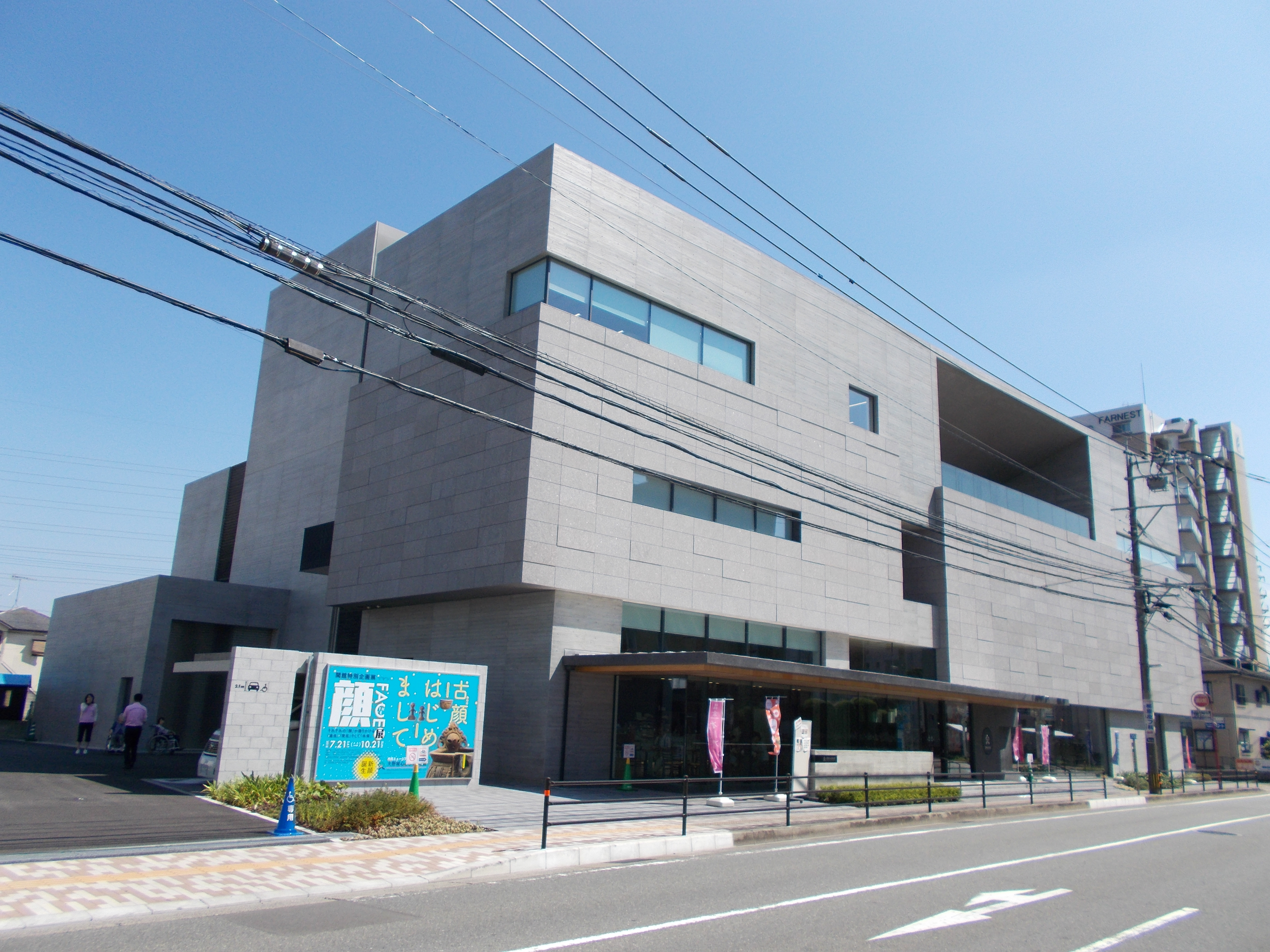
The Ōnojō Cocoro-no-furusato-kan City Museum

- Ōno Castle ruins, Special National Historic Site
- Mizuki Castle ruins, Special National Historic Site
- Ushikubi Sue Ware Kiln Site, National Historic Site
- The Ōnojō Cocoro-no-furusato-kan City Museum (大野城心のふるさと館) opened on July 21, 2018. Exhibiting materials relating to the city's natural history, archaeology, and history, it is successor of the Ōnojō Museum of History (大野城市歴史資料展示室), which opened in 1990.
- In Kamiori there is an aviary with an extensive collection of owl themed art.
- There is a Daimonji festival in September.

== Notable people from Ōnojō ==
- Aska, musician
- Yuichi Honda, baseball player
