= Kyushu Women's University =

Coordinates: 33°52′10.1″N 130°42′27.7″E

Kyushu Women's University (九州女子大学, Kyūshū joshi daigaku) is a private university in Kitakyushu, Fukuoka, Japan, established in 1962.
