= Yoshiaki Harada =

Japanese politician

- 原田 義昭
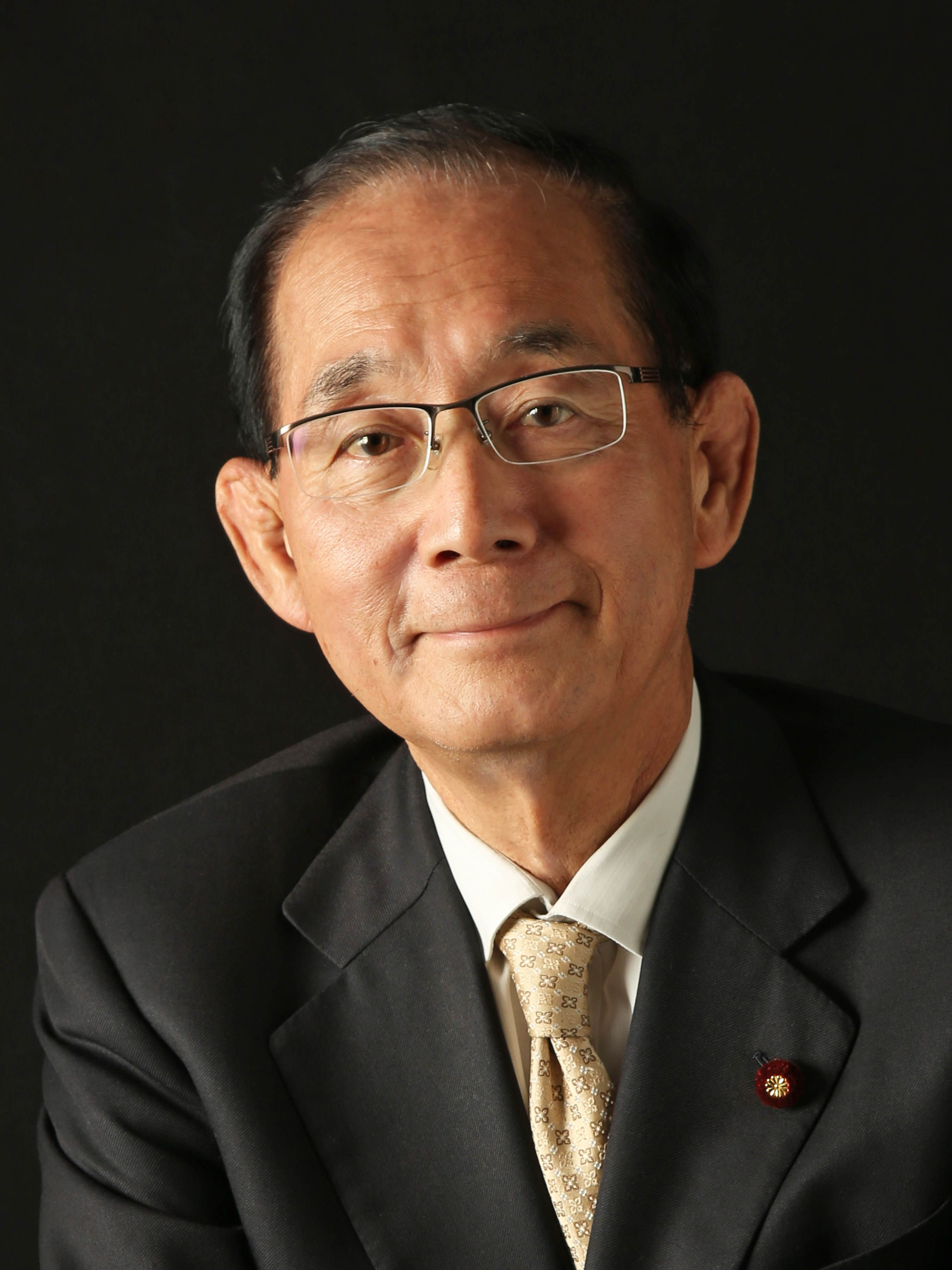
- Official portrait, 2019

Minister of the Environment
- In office 2 October 2018 – 11 September 2019
- Prime Minister: Shinzo Abe
- Preceded by: Masaharu Nakagawa
- Succeeded by: Shinjirō Koizumi

Member of the House of Representatives
- In office 21 December 2012 – 14 October 2021
- Preceded by: Daizo Kusuda
- Succeeded by: Kaname Tsutsumi
- Constituency: Fukuoka 5th
- In office 20 October 1996 – 21 Jury 2009
- Preceded by: Constituency established
- Succeeded by: Daizo Kusuda
- Constituency: Fukuoka 5th
- In office 19 February 1990 – 18 June 1993
- Preceded by: Masahiro Nakaji
- Succeeded by: Shigefumi Matsuzawa
- Constituency: Kanagawa 2nd

Personal details
- Born: 1 October 1944 (age 82) Yamada, Fukuoka, Japan
- Party: Liberal Democratic
- Education: University of Tokyo

Yoshiaki Harada (原田 義昭, Harada Yoshiaki; born 1 October 1944) is a Japanese politician of the Liberal Democratic Party, a member of the House of Representatives in the Diet (national legislature). Harada represents the 2nd District of Kanagawa prefecture, which includes the cities of Kawasaki, Yokosuka, and Kamakura.

== Overviews ==
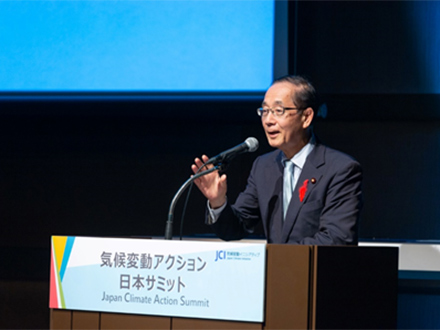
Harada addressing the Japan Climate Action Summit (at Toranomon Hills on October 12, 2018)

A native of Yamada, Fukuoka and a graduate of the University of Tokyo, he joined Nippon Steel in 1968 and the Ministry of International Trade and Industry in 1970, the year in which he also passed the bar exam. While in the ministry, he attended The Fletcher School of Law and Diplomacy at Tufts University in the United States, a graduate school of international relations. In 1990 he was elected to the House of Representatives for the first time after running unsuccessfully in 1986 as an independent. After losing his seat in 1993 he was re-elected in 1996.

Harada served as senior vice education minister until May 2004, when he was forced to resign after it was found that he had falsely claimed to have graduated from the Fletcher School, even though he had not earned enough credits to do so. He was replaced in this post by Shinya Ono.

Harada is married with three daughters and holds official ranks in judo, shogi and go.

House of Representatives (Japan)
Preceded by Hirotaka Akamatsu	Chair, Committee on Foreign Affairs of the House of Representatives; 2005–2006	Succeeded by Taimei Yamaguchi
Preceded by Tatsuya Itō	Chair, Committee on Financial Affairs of the House of Representatives; 2007–2008	Succeeded by Kazunori Tanaka
Preceded by Tetsuma Esaki	Chair, Special Committee on Consumer Affairs of the House of Representatives; 2016–2017	Succeeded by Yoshitaka Sakurada
Political offices
Preceded by Takeo Kawamura, Kisaburō Tokai	Senior Vice-Minister of Education, Culture, Sports, Science and Technology; 2003–2004; Served alongside: Ichizō Miyamoto	Succeeded by Shinya Ono, Yamato Inaba
Preceded by Masaharu Nakagawa	Minister of the Environment; 2018–2019	Succeeded by Shinjirō Koizumi
