= Ushikubi Dam =

Dam in Fukuoka Prefecture, Japan

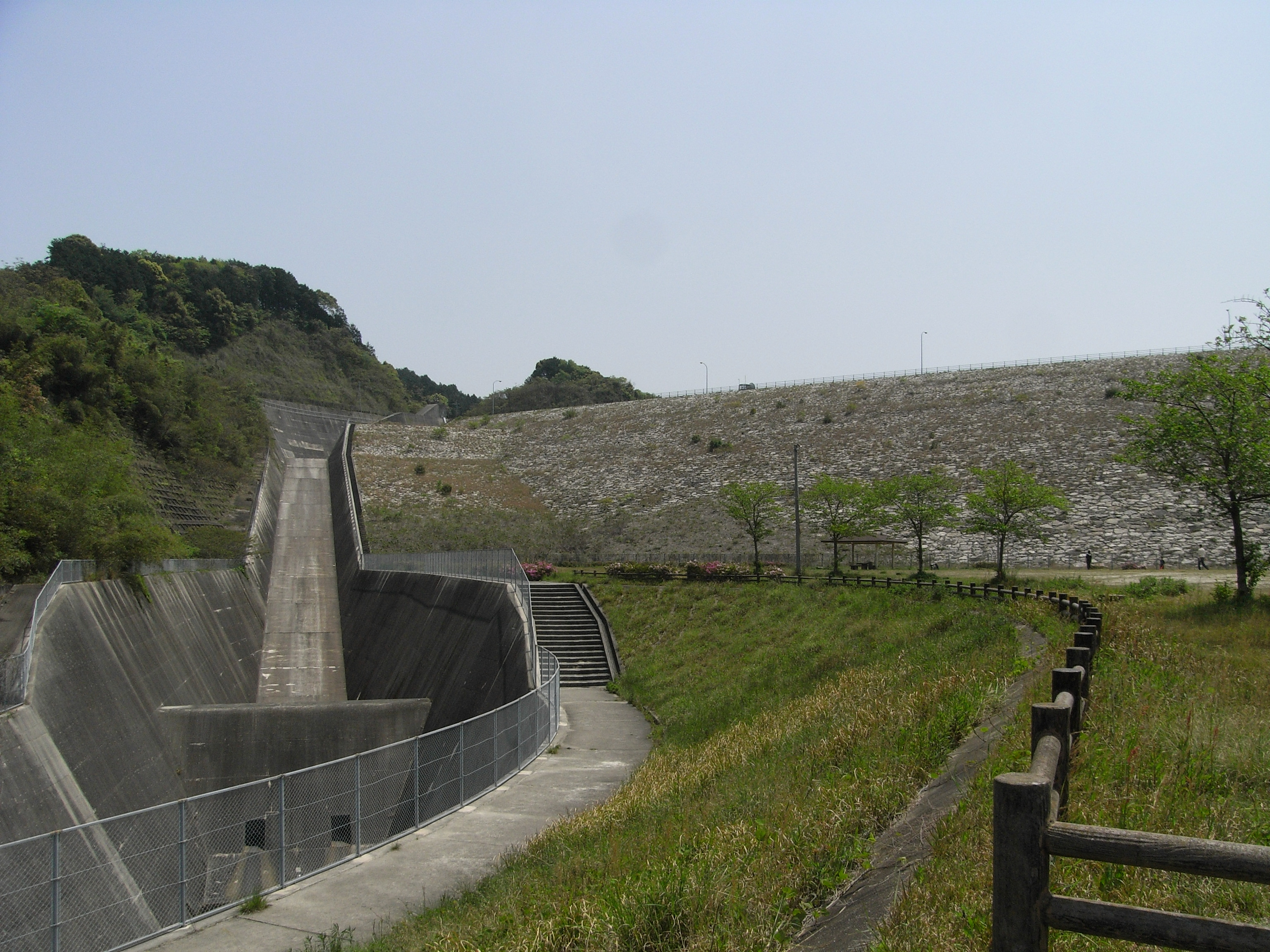
- Interactive map of Ushikubi Dam
- Location: Fukuoka Prefecture, Japan.
- Coordinates: 33.4861°N 130.479°E
- Construction began: 1972
- Opening date: 1991

Dam and spillways
- Impounds: Ushikubigawa River
- Height: 52.7 m
- Length: 383 m

Reservoir
- Total capacity: 2,280,000 m^{3}
- Catchment area: 4.4 km^{2}
- Surface area: 22 hectares

Ushikubi Dam is a dam in the Fukuoka Prefecture of Japan.
