= Chikushi District, Fukuoka =

Former district in Fukuoka Prefecture, Japan

Coordinates: 33°30′N 130°25′E

Location of Chikushi District in Fukuoka Prefecture

Chikushi (筑紫郡, Chikushi-gun) was a district located in Fukuoka Prefecture, Japan.

As of 2003, the district had an estimated population of 46,540 and a density of 620.62 persons per square kilometer. The total area was 74.99 km^{2}.

== Former towns and villages ==
- Nakagawa

== Mergers ==
- On October 1, 2018, the town of Nakagawa was elevated to city status. Chikushi District was dissolved as a result of this merger.
