= Kasuga, Fukuoka =

Kasuga 春日市
- City
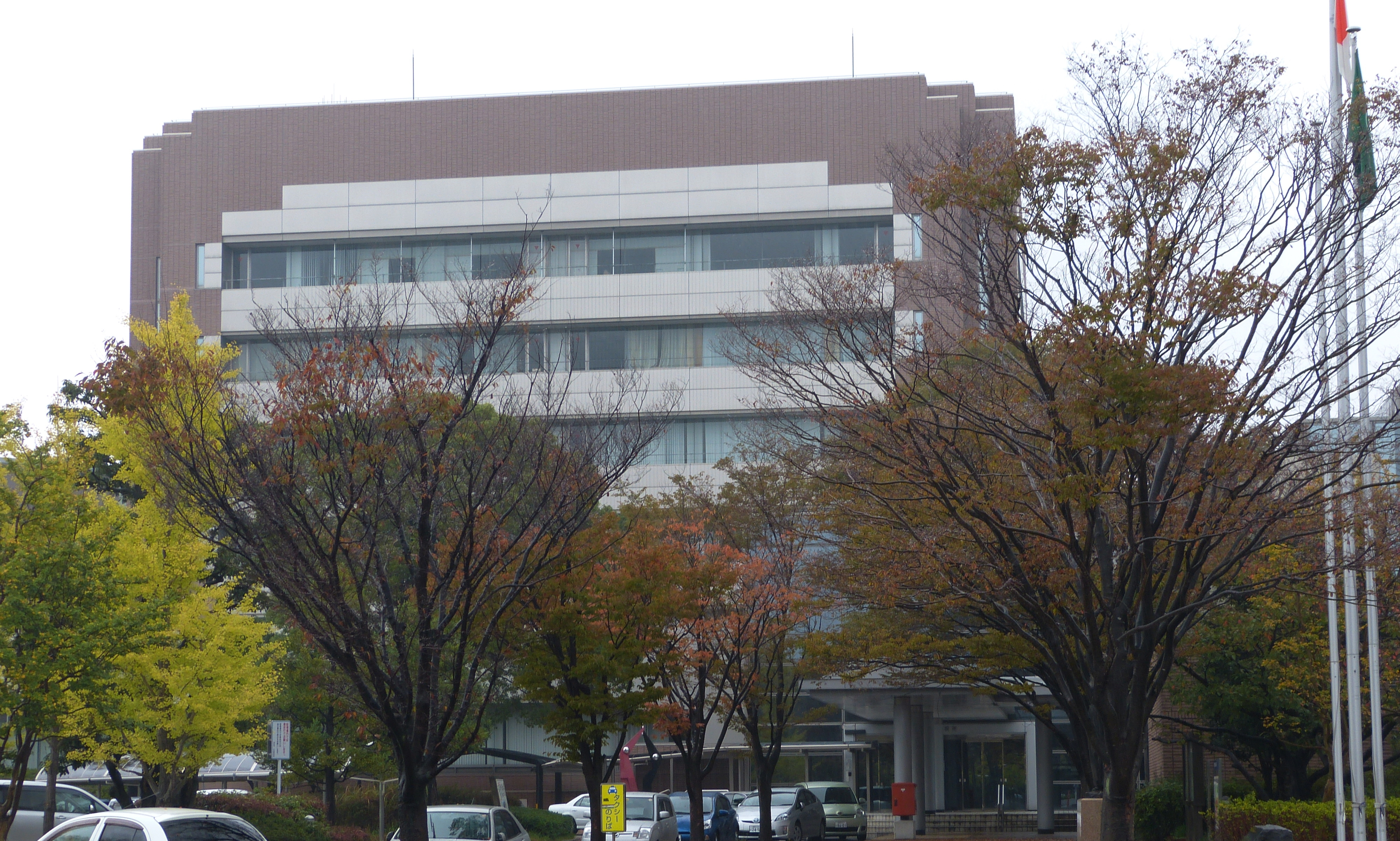
- Kasuga city hall

- Flag Emblem
- Interactive map of Kasuga
- Location in Japan
- Coordinates: 33°31′58″N 130°28′13″E
- Country: Japan
- Region: Kyushu
- Prefecture: Fukuoka

Government
  - Mayor: Sumikazu Inoue

Area
  - Total: 14.15 km^{2} (5.46 sq mi)

Population (March 31, 2024)
  - Total: 111,840
  - Density: 7,904/km^{2} (20,470/sq mi)
- Time zone: UTC+09:00 (JST)
- City hall address: 3-1-5, Haramachi, Kasuga-shi, Fukuoka-ken 816-8501
- Website: Official website
- Symbols
- Flower: Lily
- Tree: Nagi (Nageia nagi)

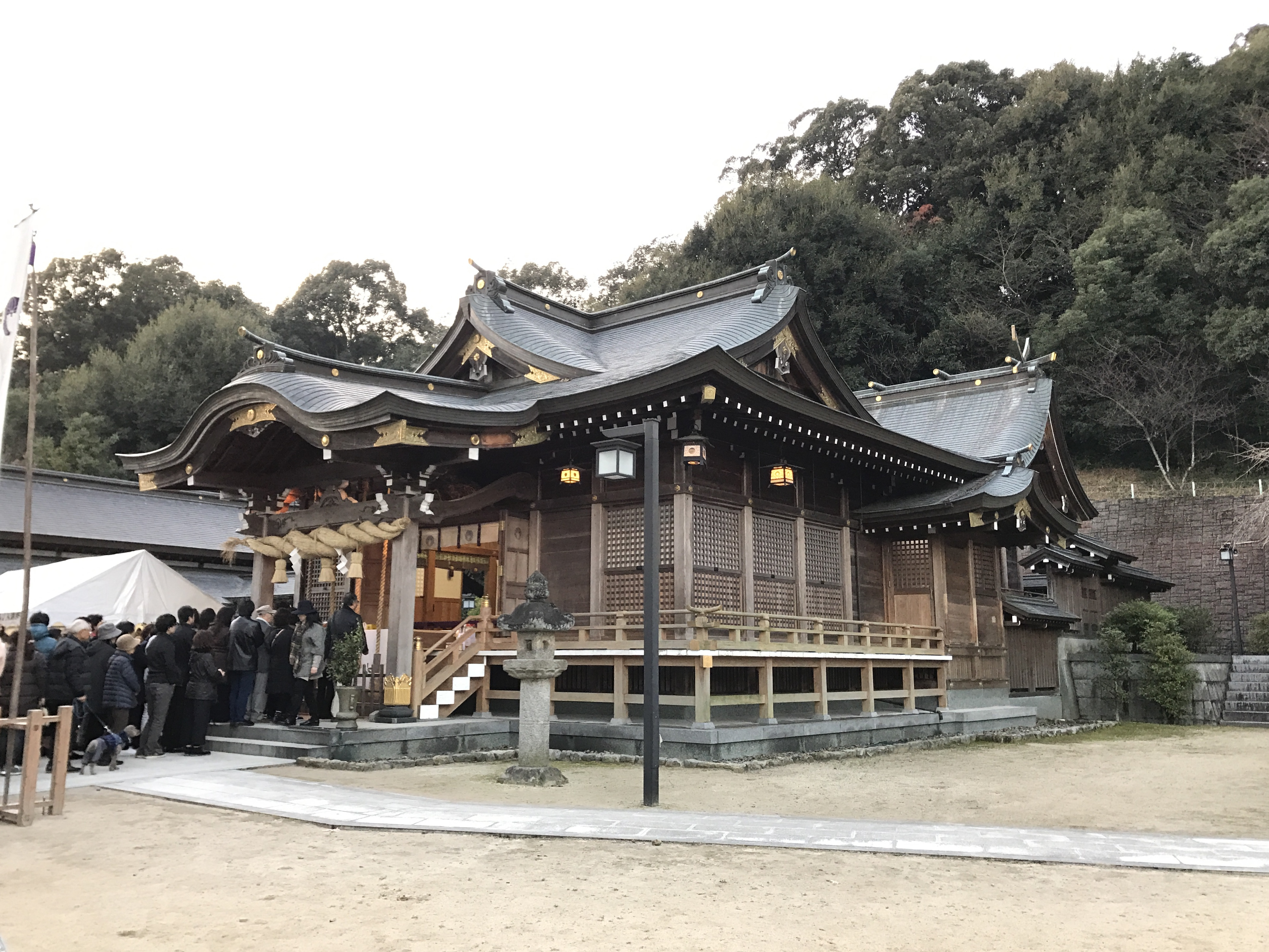
Haiden and Honden of Kasuga Shrine in Kasuga

Kasuga (春日市, Kasuga-shi; Japanese pronunciation: [kaꜜ.sɯ.ɡa, -ŋa, ka.sɯ.ɡaꜜ.ɕi, -ŋaꜜ-]) is a city located in Fukuoka Prefecture, Japan. As of 31 March 2024, the city had an estimated population of 111,840 in 50874 households, and a population density of 260 persons per km². The total area of the city is 14.145 km^{2} (5.461 sq mi).

== Geography ==
Kasuga is located in western Fukuoka Prefecture. It is adjacent to Fukuoka City to the southeast and forms part of the Fukuoka metropolitan area. The distance from the city limits to the center of Fukuoka City is approximately 10 kilometers.

=== Neighboring municipalities ===
Fukuoka Prefecture

- Fukuoka
- Nakagawa
- Ōnojō

=== Climate ===
Kasuga has a humid subtropical climate (Köppen Cfa) characterized by warm summers and cool winters with light to no snowfall. The average annual temperature in Kasuga is 14.9 °C. The average annual rainfall is 1766 mm with September as the wettest month. The temperatures are highest on average in August, at around 26.2 °C, and lowest in January, at around 4.1 °C.

=== Demographics ===
Per Japanese census data, the population of Kasuga is as shown below

Historical population
Year	Pop.	±%
1940	4,523	—
1950	14,857	+228.5%
1960	22,794	+53.4%
1970	41,599	+82.5%
1980	65,838	+58.3%
1990	88,699	+34.7%
2000	105,219	+18.6%
2010	106,798	+1.5%
2020	111,023	+4.0%

== History ==
The area of Kasuga is believed to be the center of the Yayoi period, Nakoku. It was later part of ancient Chikuzen Province and its name comes from a Kasuga Shrine which was constructed in the Nara period by the Fujiwara clan which then ruled the area.. During the Edo Period, the area was under the control of Fukuoka Domain. After the Meiji restoration, the village of Kasuga was established with the creation of the modern municipalities system on April 1, 1889. Kasuga was raised to town status on January 1, 1953. Kasuga was elevated to city status on April 1, 1972.

== Government ==
Kasuga has a mayor-council form of government with a directly elected mayor and a unicameral city council of 20 members. Kasuga contributes two members to the Fukuoka Prefectural Assembly. In terms of national politics, the city is part of the Fukuoka 5th district of the lower house of the Diet of Japan.

The Japan Air Self-Defense Force has its western regional headquarters here, namely the Kasuga Air Base.

== Economy ==
Kasuga is a regional commercial center, and is largely a commuter town for neighboring Fukuoka.

== Education ==
Kasuga has 12 public elementary schools and six public junior high schools and one public high school operated by the Fukuoka Prefectural Board of Education.

== Transportation ==
=== Railways ===
JR Kyushu - Kagoshima Main Line

JB Kasuga

JR West - Hakataminami Line

■Hakataminami

Nishitetsu - Tenjin Ōmuta Line

■ Kasugabaru

=== Highways ===
- National Route 202

== Notable people from Kasuga ==
- Yū Aoi – Actress and model
- Toshiya Sugiuchi – Baseball player
- Aoi Teshima – Voice actress and singer

== Local attractions ==
- Hihaizuka Kofun, National Historic Site
- Suguokamoto Site, National Historic Site
