= Chikuhō coalfield =

Coalfield on Kyushu Island, Japan

- 筑豊炭 (Japanese)
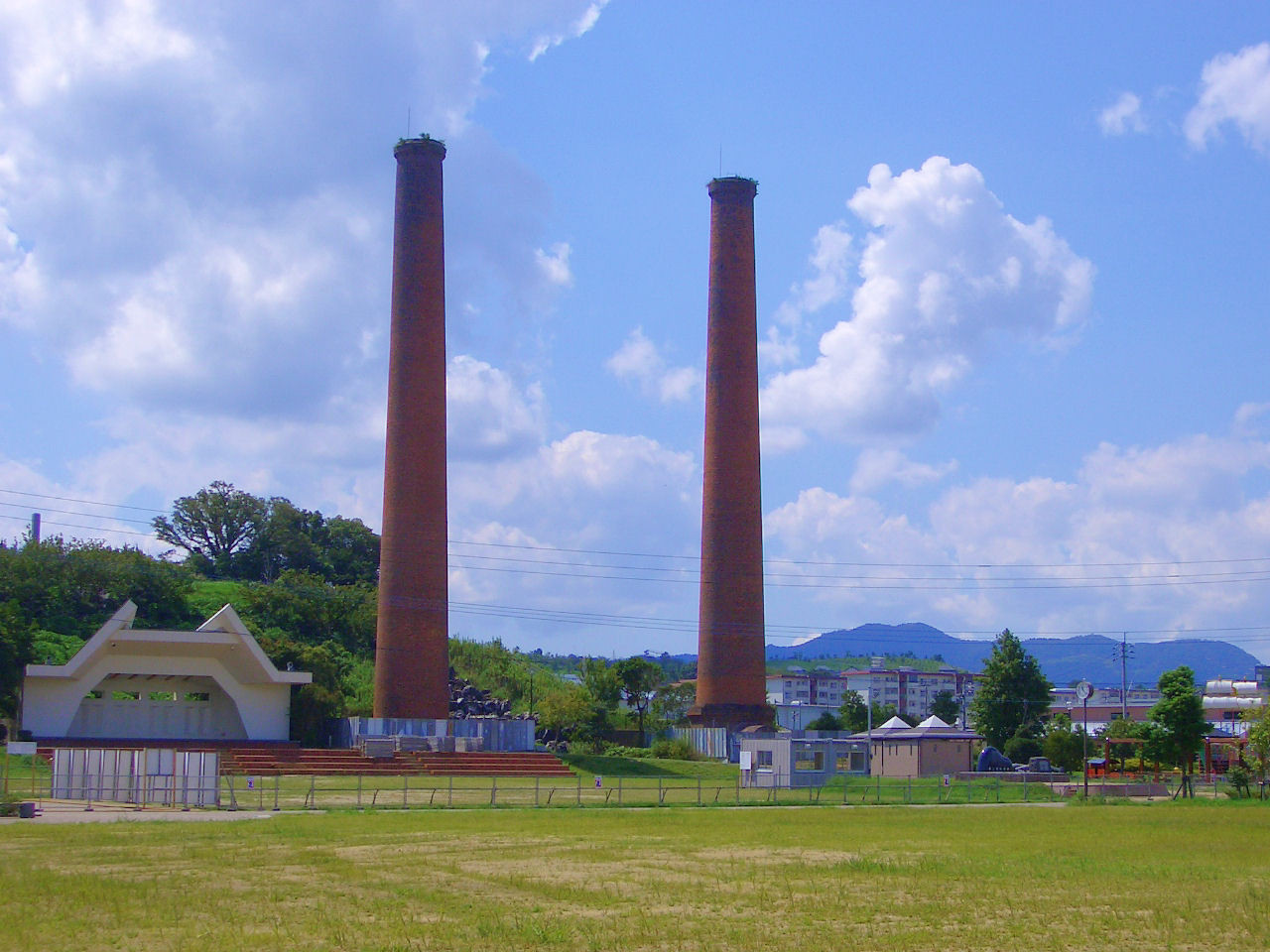
- Mitsui-Tagawa coal mine chimney
- Interactive map of Chikuhō coalfield
- Location: Kyushu, Japan
- Region: Kyushu

Site notes
- Public access: Yes (museum)

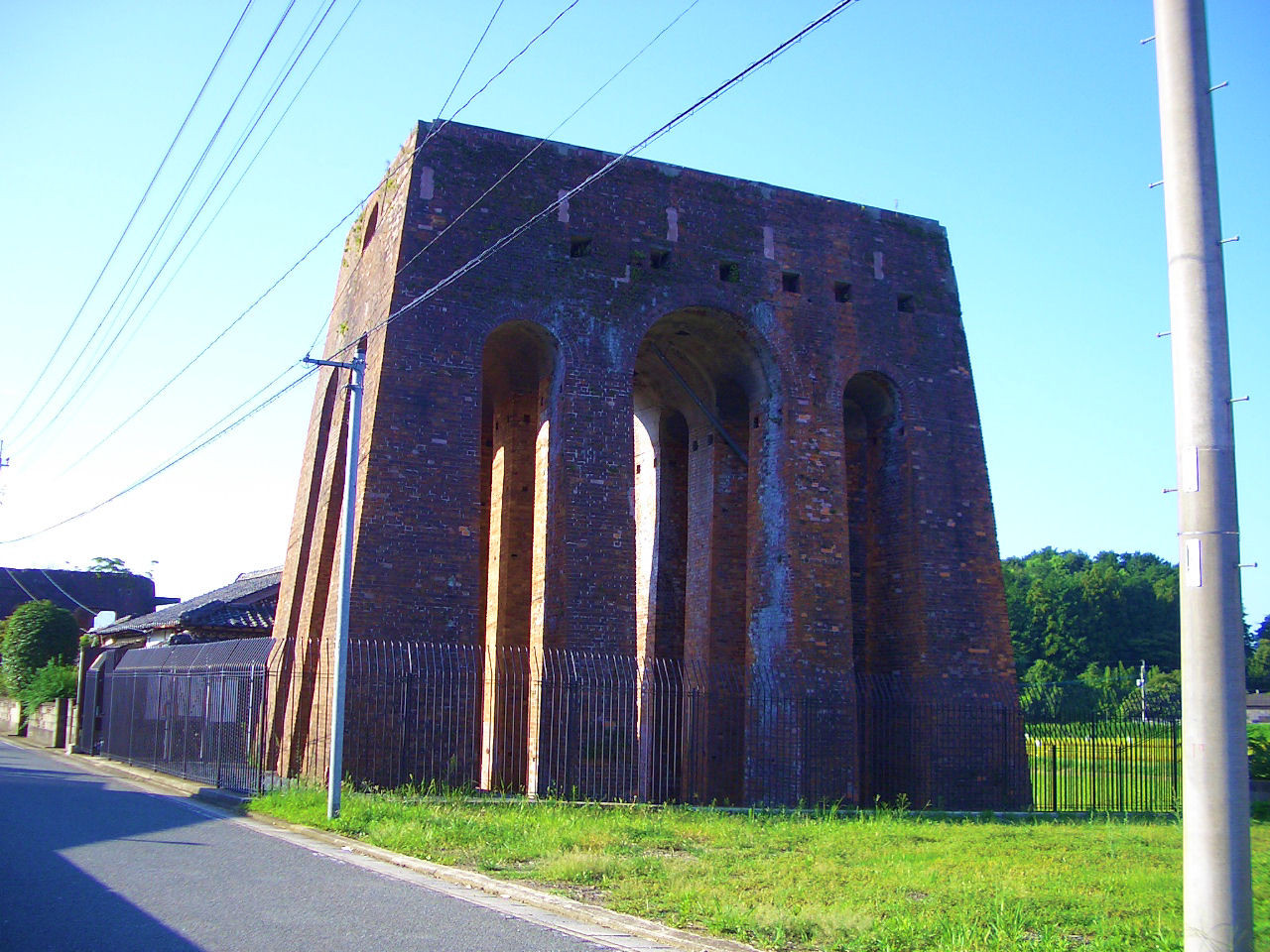
Mitsubishi-Iizuka coal mine

The Chikuhō coalfield (筑豊炭田) is located on Kyushu Island, Japan. With the promotion of industrial development and the establishment of the Yahata Steel Works, zaibatsu companies and major capital investment led to rapid development of coal mines and the area produced more than half of the nation's coal, making it the largest coal field in Japan before World War II.

== Overview and history ==
The Chikuho Coalfield spans six municipalities and four counties in Fukuoka Prefecture: Kitakyushu, Nakama, Nōgata, Iizuka, Tagawa, Yamada, Onga District, Kurate District, Kaho District, and Tagawa.

The coalfields spread across the basins of the Onga, Kama, Honami, Hikoyama, and Inunaki rivers. The area was limited to the mountain range from Mount Fukuchi to Mount Koharudake in the east, the Mount Kodaiji and Sangun Mountains to the west, the granite forming Mount Kumagahata to the south, and the Gulf of Hibiki to the north, occupying an area of approximately 787 square kilometers. The name "Chikuhō" is an acronym for Chikuzen and Buzen, the names of the former provinces the area straddles. There is also a coalfield in Kasuya District adjacent to the west side of the Chikuhō area, but this is called the "Kasuya Coalfield" and is geographically separate.

Around the middle of the Muromachi period, local residents discovered coal and used it as a more efficient fuel than firewood. Coal began to be used as a fuel in salt production from around the mid-Edo period (1700s AD), so both Kokura and Fukuoka Domain placed coal mining, transportation, and sales within the region under domain control, and began developing coal mines as a major source of income. From the Meiji period, the importance of coal as fuel for steamships and steam locomotives, as well as in production of iron and steel was immediately evident to the Meiji government, and coal mine development proceeded rapidly. With the start of operations at Yawata Steel Works (currently Nippon Steel Yawata Works), which began operations in 1901, demand increased further and production increased. Also, around the same time various zaibatsu entered coal mine development. The area grew to become Japan's largest coal producing area before the war. On February 6, 1913, a coal dust explosion occurred at the Futase Coal Mine Chuo Iwaken in Honami Village, Kaho District, killing 103 of the 124 people inside, including 18 women.

The prosperity of the area continued for a long time after World War II, as Japan rebuilt and re-industrialized. However, due to the torrential rains of July 1951 and the heavy rains of the 1953 Northern Kyushu flood many small and medium-sized coal mines were flooded and went out of business. Additionally, the energy revolution progressed from the late 1950s and the main energy source shifted from coal to oil. A government policy of developing highly efficient coal mines and abolishing low-efficiency mines (scrap-and-build policy) was promoted. The coal mines in Chikuhō were becoming increasingly exhausted due to over-excavation and overuse of equipment, and there was little room for new mine development, leading to the closure of all coal mines by the mid 1970s. This led to economic depression in the region, and high unemployment led to extensive depopulation as the labor force migrated to other locations. Many of the local railway lines lost their role due to the closure of mines, and many of the railway lines were abandoned as well. Some of the mine sites have been redeveloped as industrial parks, taking advantage of their location near the Kitakyushu Industrial Zone, and some former mining companies have transitioned from coal mining to cement, glass, or other industries. However, the soil in the coalfield area has been contaminated by coal mining and processing, making it unsuitable for agriculture without extensive soil remediation.

In order to preserve historical materials, Nōgata, Tagawa, Iizuka and Miyawaka have opened museums and archives that specialize in coal. The sites of the Mitsui Tagawa Mine Ita Pit (三井田川鉱業所伊田坑跡), Shakanoo Pit (目尾炭坑跡), and Former Chikuhō Coal Mining Association Nōgata Meeting Hall and First-Aid Practice Pit (旧筑豊石炭鉱業組合直方会議所及び救護練習所模擬坑道) were collectively designated a National Historic Site of Japan in 2018.

== Location of the coalfield and its collieries ==
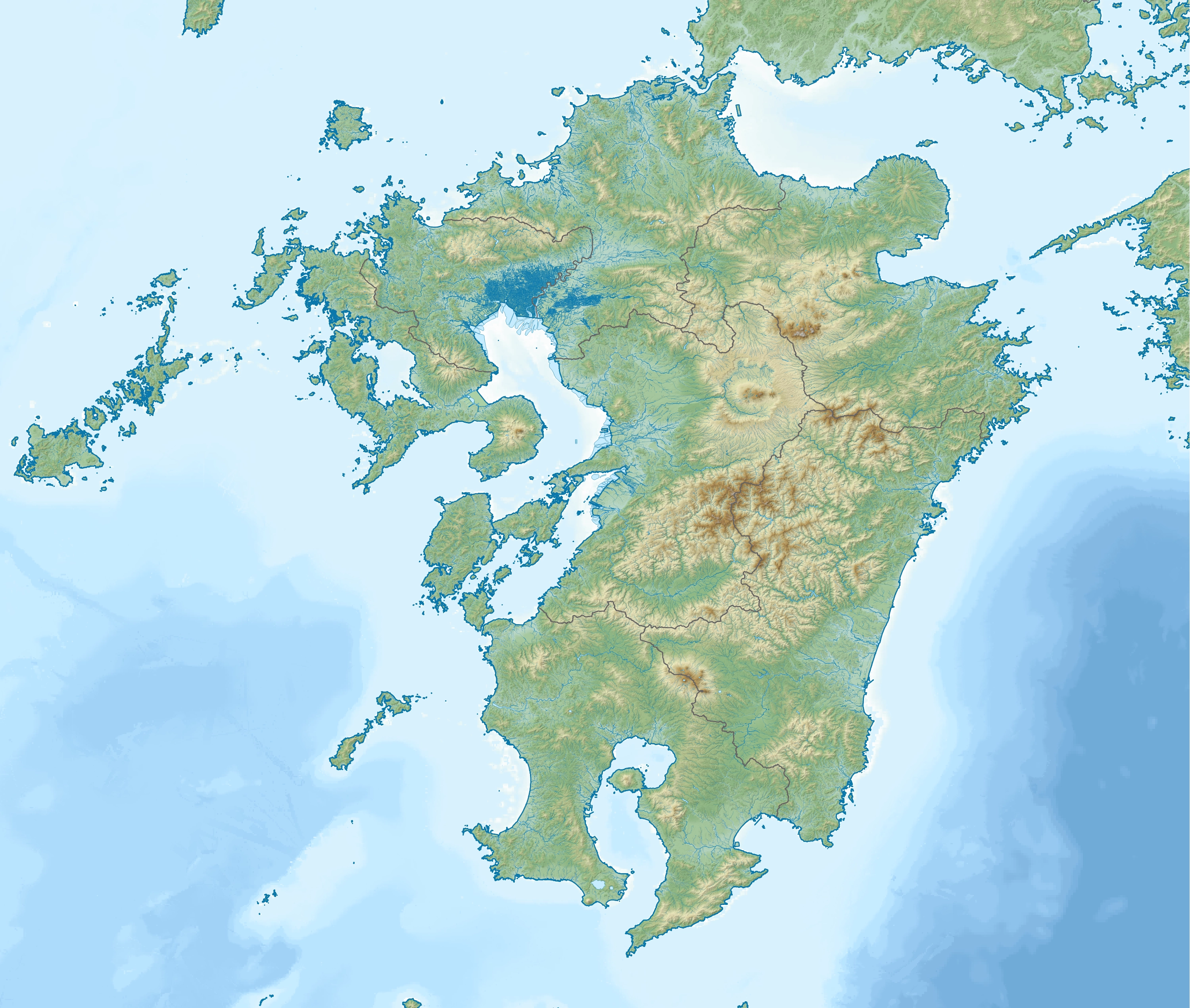
The coalmines of Chikuhō

== See also ==
- List of Historic Sites of Japan (Fukuoka)
