= Kaho =

Kaho may refer to:

== Places ==
- Kaho, Burkina Faso, a village in southern Burkina Faso
- Kaho District, Fukuoka (嘉穂郡), a district in Fukuoka, Japan
- Kaho, Fukuoka (嘉穂町), a town located in Kaho District
- 4284 Kaho, a main-belt asteroid
- Kaho, India, a village in India-China border in Arunachal Pradesh

== Other uses ==
- Kaho (given name)
- Kaho (born 1991), Japanese actress
- Kahō, a Japanese era (1094–1096)
- Kaho Manufacturing, Japanese company
- Ale Kaho (born 2000), American football player
- Simone Kaho (born 1978), New Zealand poet

== See also ==
- Kaho Naa... Pyaar Hai, a 2000 Bollywood blockbuster movie
- Kahoʻolawe, the smallest of the eight main volcanic islands in the Hawaiian Islands
