= Inatsu =

Inatsu is a Japanese surname. Notable people with the surname include:

- Hidenori Inatsu (born 1938), Japanese ice hockey player
- Hisashi Inatsu (born 1958), Japanese politician

== See also ==
- Inatsuki, Fukuoka
