= Iwano =

Iwano may refer to:

- Hōmei Iwano (岩野 泡鳴; 1873–1920), Japanese writer
- Kaho Iwano (岩野 夏帆; born 1999), Japanese water polo player
- 10805 Iwano, a main-belt asteroid, named after Japanese engineer and amateur astronomer Hisaka Iwano (born 1957)
