= Keisen, Fukuoka =

Town in Fukuoka Prefecture, Japan

Keisen 桂川町
- Town
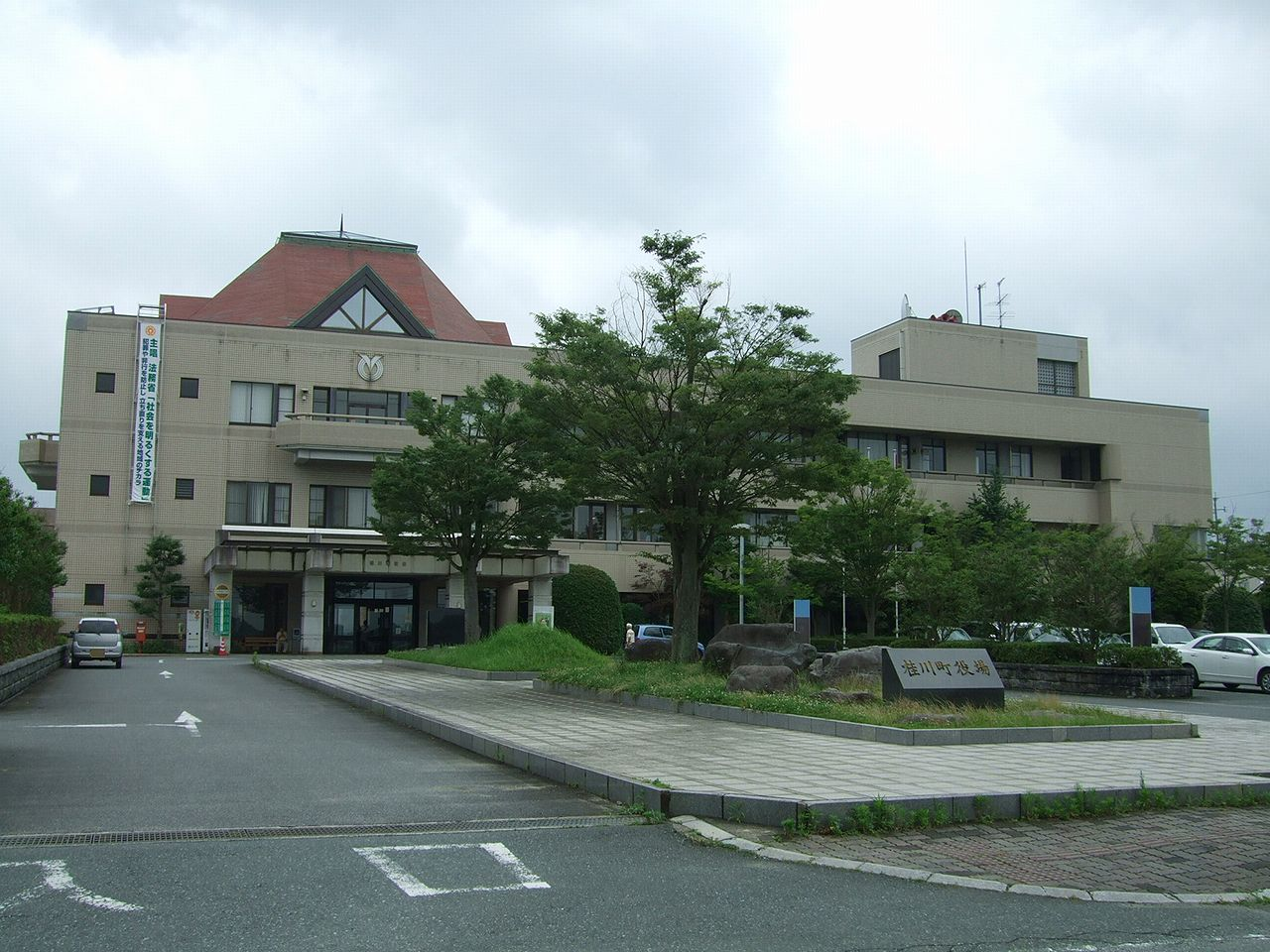
- Keisen Town Hall

- Flag Chapter
- Interactive map of Keisen
- Location in Japan
- Coordinates: 33°34′44″N 130°40′41″E
- Country: Japan
- Region: Kyushu
- Prefecture: Fukuoka
- District: Kaho

Area
  - Total: 20.14 km^{2} (7.78 sq mi)

Population (January 31, 2024)
  - Total: 12,832
  - Density: 637.1/km^{2} (1,650/sq mi)
- Time zone: UTC+09:00 (JST)
- City hall address: 424-1 Doi, Katsuragawa-cho, Kaho-gun, Fukuoka-ken 820-0696
- Website: Official website
- Symbols
- Flower: Sunflower
- Tree: Cercidiphyllum japonicum

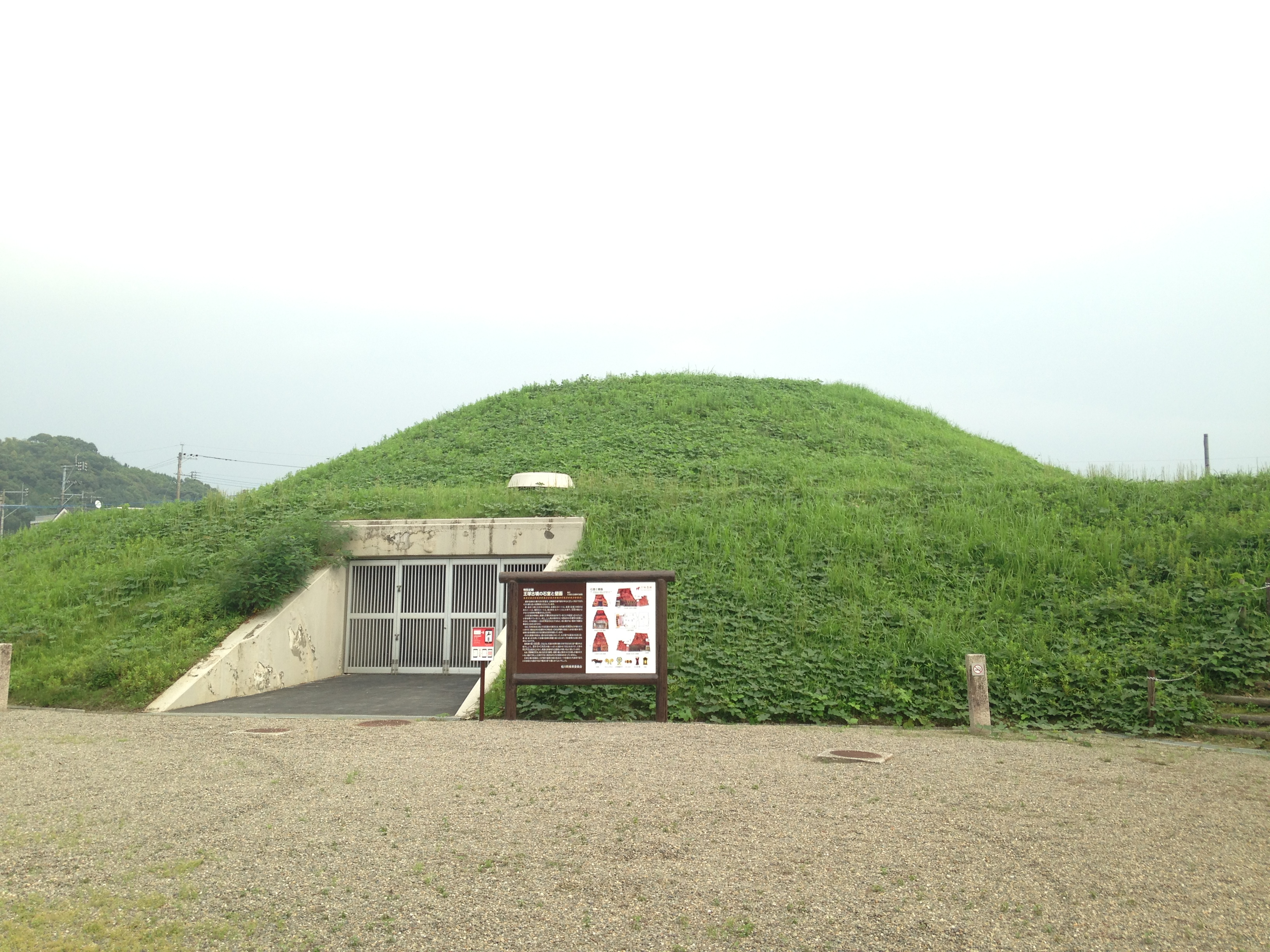
Ōzuka Kofun

Keisen (桂川町, Keisen-machi) is a town located in Kaho District, Fukuoka Prefecture, Japan. As of 31 January 2024, the town had an estimated population of 12,832 in 6250 households, and a population density of 640 people per km^{2}. The total area of the town is 20.14 km^{2} (7.78 sq mi).

== Geography ==
Keisen is located in the central part of Fukuoka Prefecture, at the southern end of the Chikuho region. It is located approximately 25 kilometers east of Fukuoka City, and approximately 55 kilometers southwest of Kitakyushu City.

=== Neighboring municipalities ===
Fukuoka Prefecture

- Iizuka
- Kama

=== Climate ===
Keisen has a humid subtropical climate (Köppen Cfa) characterized by warm summers and cool winters with light to no snowfall. The average annual temperature in Keisen is 15.1 °C. The average annual rainfall is 1678 mm with September as the wettest month. The temperatures are highest on average in August, at around 26.4 °C, and lowest in January, at around 4.0 °C.

=== Demographics ===
Per Japanese census data, the population of Keisen is as shown below:

Historical population
Year	Pop.	±%
1940	19,677	—
1950	23,052	+17.2%
1960	21,252	−7.8%
1970	11,912	−43.9%
1980	12,780	+7.3%
1990	14,182	+11.0%
2000	14,760	+4.1%
2020	12,878	−12.8%

== History ==
The area of Keisen was part of ancient Chikuzen Province. Stone tools from the Japanese Paleolithic and numerous burial mounds from the Kofun period indicate that the area has been inhabited for many thousands of years. It was ruled by the Asakura clan during the Sengoku period. During the Edo Period, the area was under the control of Fukuoka Domain. After the Meiji restoration, the village of Keisen was established with the creation of the modern municipalities system on April 1, 1889. Keisen was raised to town status on April 17, 1940. Keisen was home to Fukuoka POW Camp in 1944 during World War II. The last coal mine closed in 1972.

== Government ==
Keisen has a mayor-council form of government with a directly elected mayor and a unicameral town council of 10 members. Keisen, collectively with the city of Iizuka, contributes two members to the Fukuoka Prefectural Assembly. In terms of national politics, the city is part of the Fukuoka 8th district of the lower house of the Diet of Japan.

== Economy ==
During the Meiji period, Keisen, along with the other municipalities of the Chikuho area, developed with the Kitakyushu industrial zone through coal mining, and is still considered part of to the Greater Kitakyushu Metropolitan Area. However, as the demand for coal decreased due to the energy revolution, the coal mines that had sponsored prosperity have closed, leading to depopulation. Efforts are being made to revitalize the former sites by reusing them as industrial parks.

== Education ==
Keisen has two public elementary schools and one public junior high school by the town government, and one public high school operated by the Fukuoka Prefectural Board of Education.

== Transportation ==
=== Railways ===
JR Kyushu - Chikuhō Main Line

JG Keisen

JR Kyushu - Sasaguri Line

JC Keisen

=== Highways ===
- National Route 200

== Local attractions ==
- Ōzuka Kofun, near Keisen Station, is designated as a Special National Historic Site, and has its own museum. Ozuka was built in the 6th century AD and is a decorated kofun. It was closed to the public for preservation in 1967, but is now open twice a year. The museum has a full size reconstruction of the tomb with information in Japanese and English.
