= Kaita =

Kaita may refer to:

- Kaita, Hiroshima, a town in Japan
- Kaita, Fukuoka, a former town in Japan
- Kaita, Nigeria, a Local Government Area in Katsina State
- Sani Kaita, a Nigerian footballer
- Korean American IT Association, a non-profit professional association of Koreans in IT fields
