= Shōnai, Fukuoka =

Former town in Fukuoka Prefecture, Japan

Shōnai (庄内町, Shōnai-machi) was a town located in Kaho District, Fukuoka Prefecture, Japan.

As of 2003, the town had an estimated population of 10,980 and a density of 427.40 persons per km^{2}. The total area was 25.69 km^{2}.

On March 26, 2006, Shōnai, along with the towns of Chikuho, Honami and Kaita (all from Kaho District), was merged into the expanded city of Iizuka.
