= Kaho (given name) =

- Gender: Female

Origin
- Origin: Japanese
- Meaning: It can have many different meanings depending on the kanji used

Other names
- Related names: Kayo; Kahoko

Kaho is a feminine Japanese name written in different kanji characters and having different meanings:

- 花歩, "flower, walk/progress"
- 花穂, "flower, ear (of grain)"
- 果歩, "fruit, walk/progress"
- 香穂, "incense, ear (of grain)"
- 夏帆, "summer, sail"
- 夏穂, "summer, ear (of grain)"
- 嘉穂, "praise, ear (of grain)"
- 加保, "add, protect"
- 歌歩, "song, walk/progress"
- 香帆, "incense, sail"

The name can also be written in hiragana or katakana.

== People with the name ==
- Kaho (actress) (夏帆), a Japanese actress and fashion model
- Kaho Fujishima (果歩; born 2006), Japanese idol and member of Hinatazaka46
- Kaho Iwano (夏帆; born 1999), Japanese water polo player
- Kaho Kawamura (夏帆; born 2007), Japanese idol and member of Super Girls (Japanese group)
- Kaho Kobayashi (singer) (歌穂; born 2000), Japanese idol and former member of Shiritsu Ebisu Chugaku
- Kaho Kobayashi (香萌; born 1992), Japanese professional wrestler
- Kaho Kōda (夏穂), a Japanese voice actress
- Kaho Mashimo (華穂; born 1999), Japanese idol and member of NGT48
- Kaho Minagawa (夏穂; born 1997), Japanese individual rhythmic gymnast
- Kaho Minami (果歩), a Japanese actress
- Kaho Miyake (花圃; 1868−1943), Japanese novelist, essayist, and poet
- Kaho Miyasaka (香帆), a Japanese manga artist
- Kaho Nakamura (佳穂; born 1992), Japanese singer-songwriter and voice actress
- Kaho Nakayama (handballer) (佳穂; born 1998), Japanese female handball player
- Kaho Nakayama (writer) (可穂; born 1960), Japanese writer
- Kaho Onodera (佳步; born 1991), Japanese curler
- Kaho Osawa (佳歩; born 2001), Japanese badminton player
- Kaho Sakuma (夏帆), Japanese idol and former member of Passpo
- Kaho Satō (佳穂; born 1997), Japanese idol and member of SKE48
- Kaho Shibuya (果歩), a Japanese media personality
- Kaho Shimada (歌穂), a Japanese singer and musical theater actress
- Kaho Sunami (果帆; born 1993), Japanese handball player
- Kaho Suzuki (鈴木 花歩; born 2002), Japanese ice hockey player
- Kaho Takada (夏帆; born 1996), Japanese actress and tarento
- Kaho Tanaka (花歩; born 1997), Japanese field hockey player

== Fictional characters ==
- Kaho Hinata (夏帆), a character in the anime and manga series Blend S
- Kaho Hinoshita (花帆), a main character in mobile app Link! Like! Love Live!
- Kaho Mikami (歌歩), a character in the anime and manga series World Trigger
- Kaho Mizuki (歌帆), a character in the anime and manga series Cardcaptor Sakura
- Kaho Serizawa (香穂), the heroine of the Japanese visual novel Hourglass of Summer
