= Ōzuka Kofun =

Kofun period decorated kofun burial mounds in Japan

- 王塚古墳 (Japanese)
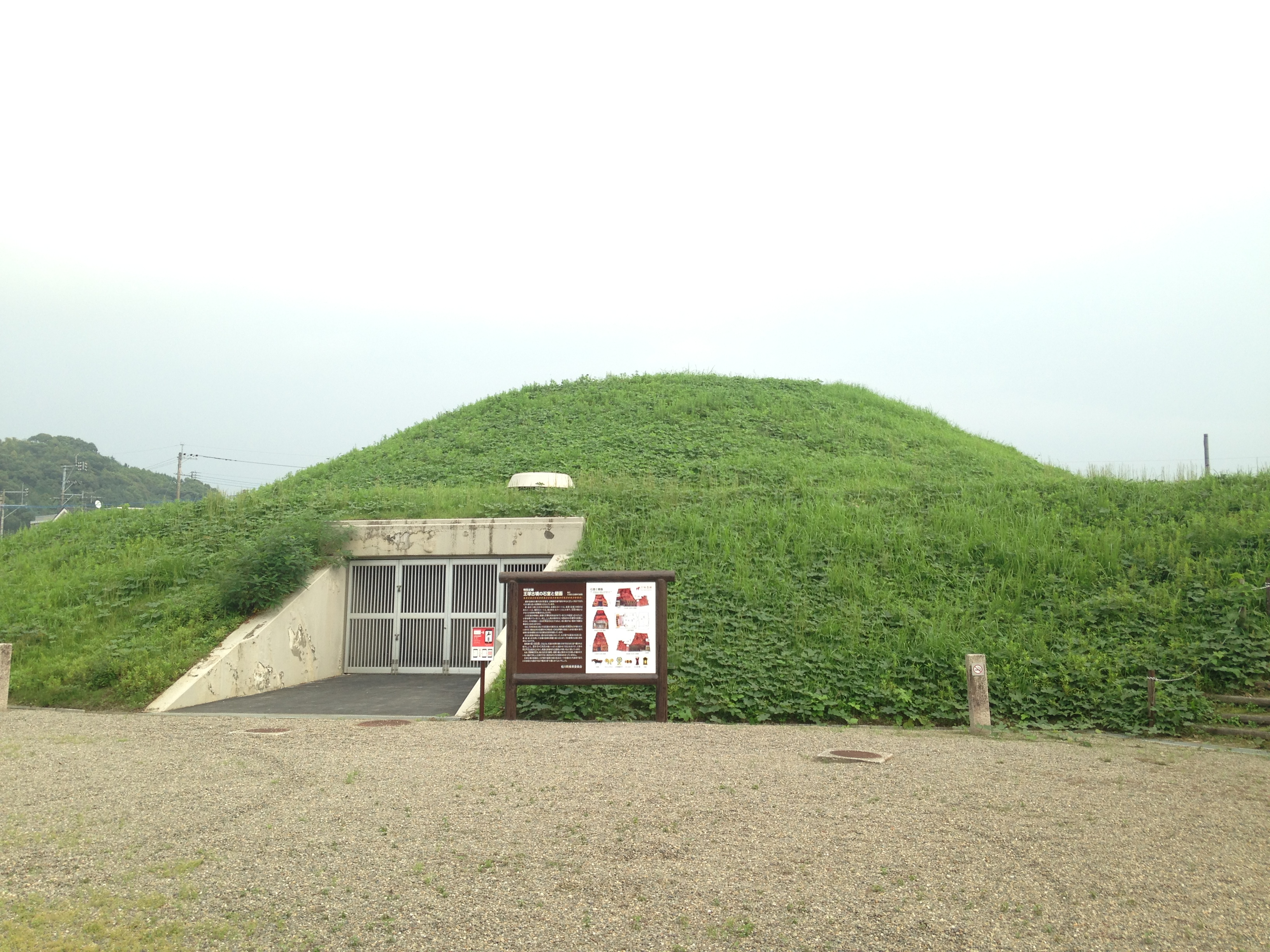
- Ōzuka Kofun

- Ōzuka Kofun Ōzuka Kofun (Japan)
- Interactive map of Ōzuka Kofun
- 33°35′19.55″N 130°39′50.2″E
- Type: Kofun
- Periods: Kofun period
- Location: Keisen, Fukuoka, Japan
- Region: Kyushu

History
- Built: c.6th century

Site notes
- Public access: Yes (no facilities)

The Ōzuka Kofun (王塚古墳) is a Kofun period decorated kofun burial mounds, located in the Jumei neighborhood of the town of Keisen, Fukuoka Prefecture, Japan. The tumulus was designated a National Historic Site of Japan in 1937, and elevated in status to that of a Special National Historic Site in 1956

== Overview ==
The Ōzuka Kofun was discovered by chance on September 30, 1934, when the front part of the stone burial chamber was scraped away during construction work. The shape of the tumulus is that of a zenpō-kōen-fun (前方後円墳), which is shaped like a keyhole, having one square end and one circular end, when viewed from above; however, more than half of the mound has been lost due to previous construction work. The original length is estimated to have been 86 meters, with a posterior circular portion diameter of 56 meters and height of 9.5 meters, and an anterior rectangular portion width of 60 meters. The tumulus was constructed in two tiers, with alternating layers of red and black clay, covered by fukiishi. It was surrounded by a double moat.

The burial chamber is a horizontal entry stone chamber, with a stone shelf at the top of the back wall and a small window above the entrance. It has a house-shaped cap stone that covers the sarcophagus, and the floor is divided into areas for two burials, with two depressions are made to place the heads, and two stone pillows. However, it is estimated that four people were buried here. Currently, the burial chamber is completely sealed for preservation, although it open to the public twice a year, in spring and fall. It is noteworthy in that mural painting that covers almost the entire surface of the burial chamber. The images depicted include horses, shields, swords, bows, and geometric patterns such as concentric ring patterns, warabi patterns, triangular patterns, and circular patterns. Six colors (red, yellow, green, blue, black, and white) have been confirmed in decorated kofun around Japan, and this tumulus uses five of these six colors (except for blue). This is the highest number of colors for any known tomb in Japan.

When excavated, the burial chamber was found to be intact, and thus a large number of grave goods were recovered. These include a bronze mirror, a lapis lazuli tubular bead, two wooden beads with metal inlay, nine earthen beads, one amber bead, one gold item, metal fittings for horse harnesses, saddles and stirrups, and iron swords, arrowheads and a large quantity of Sue ware pottery. The excavated artifacts were designated as a National Important Cultural Property in 1956 and are stored at the Kyoto National Museum.

The tumulus is a six-minute walk (480 meters) from Keisen Station on the JR Kyushu Chikuho Main Line. The Ōzuka Decorated Kofun Museum (王塚装飾古墳館) on site has displays of the murals in the burial chamber.

== See also ==
- List of Historic Sites of Japan (Fukuoka)
- Decorated kofun
