= Kama, Fukuoka =

Kama 嘉麻市
- City
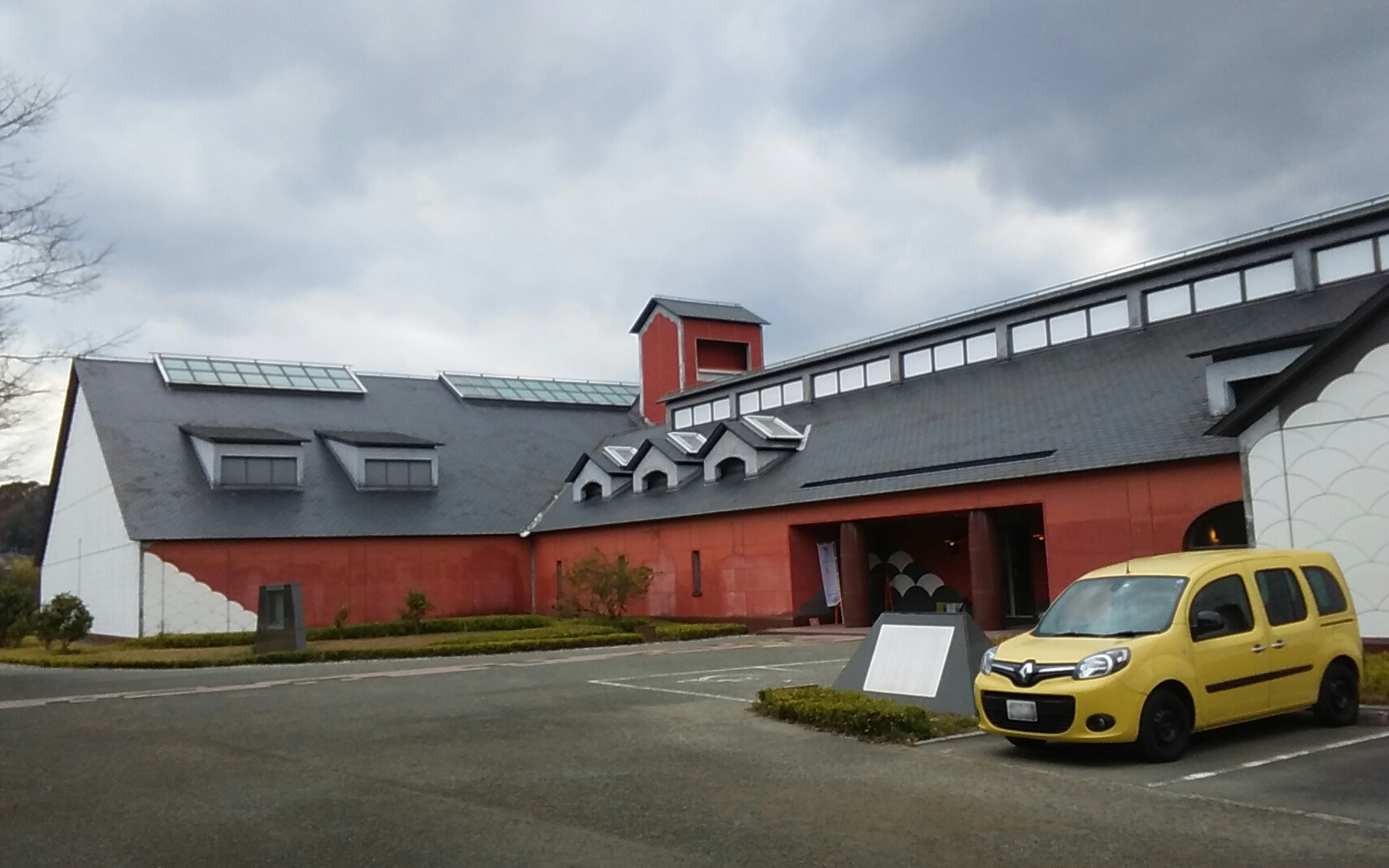
- Hiroki Oda Art Museum

- Flag Emblem
- Interactive map of Kama
- Location in Japan
- Coordinates: 33°35′54″N 130°43′10″E
- Country: Japan
- Region: Kyushu
- Prefecture: Fukuoka

Area
  - Total: 135.11 km^{2} (52.17 sq mi)

Population (February 29, 2024)
  - Total: 34,800
  - Density: 258/km^{2} (667/sq mi)
- Time zone: UTC+09:00 (JST)
- City hall address: 1180-1 Iwasaki, Kama City, Fukuoka-ken 820-0292
- Website: Official website
- Symbols
- Flower: Rhododendron
- Tree: Sakura

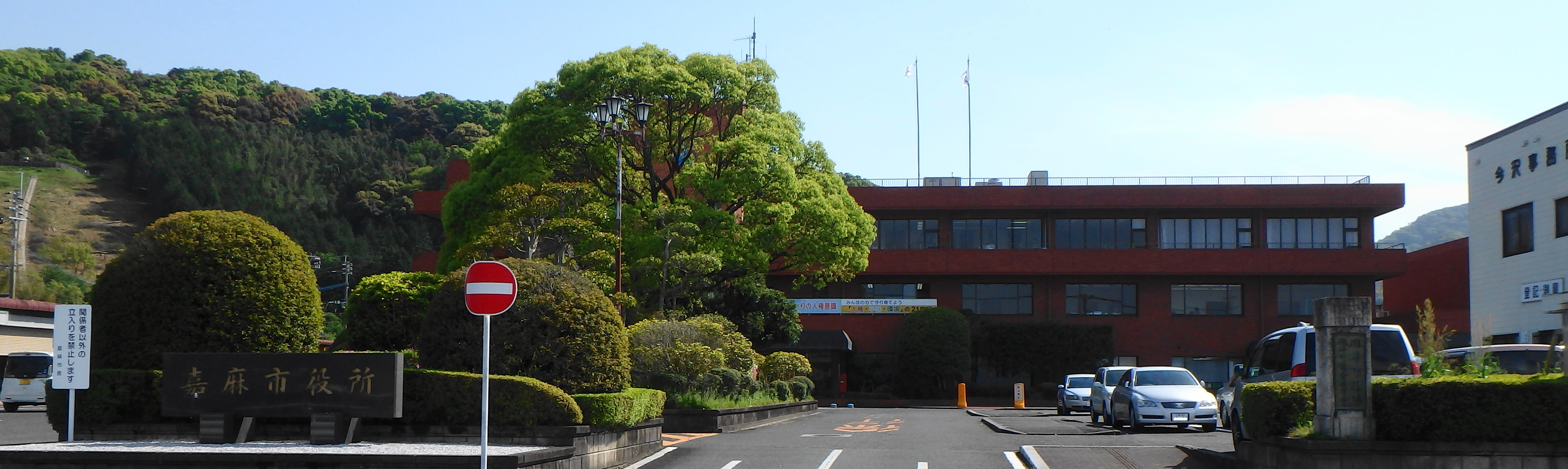
Kama City Hall

Kama (嘉麻市, Kama-shi) is a city located in Fukuoka Prefecture, Japan. As of 29 February 2024, the city had an estimated population of 34,800 in 18035 households, and a population density of 260 persons per km^{2}. The total area of the city is 135.11 km^{2} (52.17 sq mi).

== Geography ==
Kama is located almost in the center of Fukuoka Prefecture. The Onga River flows through the central part of the city, and the southern part of the city is surrounded by the Chikushi Mountains, which are over 1,000 meters above sea level.

=== Neighboring municipalities ===
Fukuoka Prefecture

- Asakura
- Chikusen
- Iizuka
- Kawasaki
- Keisen
- Soeda
- Tagawa
- Tōhō

=== Climate ===
Kama has a humid subtropical climate (Köppen Cfa) characterized by warm summers and cool winters with light to no snowfall. The average annual temperature in Kama is 16.9 °C. The average annual rainfall is 8877 mm with September as the wettest month. The temperatures are highest on average in August, at around 30.28 °C, and lowest in January, at around 3.73 °C.

=== Demographics ===
Per Japanese census data, the population of Kama is as shown below

Historical population
Year	Pop.	±%
1950	112,212	—
1960	99,472	−11.4%
1970	58,420	−41.3%
1980	54,703	−6.4%
1990	52,497	−4.0%
2000	48,378	−7.8%
2010	42,589	−12.0%
2020	36,764	−13.7%

== History ==
The area of Kama was part of ancient Chikuzen Province, and was ruled by the Asakura clan during the Sengoku period. During the Edo Period, the area was under the control of Fukuoka Domain, whose rules, the Kuroda clan, established a subsidiary domain in what is now Asakura called Akizuki Domain. Most of Kama was part of the holdings of Akizuki Domain. After the Meiji restoration, the town of Usui and villages of Kumada, Inatsuki, Okuma, Senju, Miyano, Ashishira, Inatsuki, Kaho, Usui, Usui were established within Kaho District, Fukuoka. Okuma was raised to town status in 1892. Kumada was raised to town status in 1924 and renamed Yamada in 1925. In 1941, Unatsuki and Usui village were raised to town status and in 1954 Yamada was raised to city status. In 1955, the town of Okuma merged with the villages of Senju, Miyano, and Ashishira.

On March 27, 2006 - the city of Yamada City, and towns of Kaho, Usui, and Inazuki merged to form the city of Kama. The city hall's main office is the former Usui Town Hall.

== Government ==
Kama has a mayor-council form of government with a directly elected mayor and a unicameral city council of 16 members. Kama contributes one member to the Fukuoka Prefectural Assembly. In terms of national politics, the city is part of the Fukuoka 8th district of the lower house of the Diet of Japan.

== Economy ==
During the Meiji period, Kama, along with the other municipalities of the Chikuho area, developed with the Kitakyushu industrial zone through coal mining, and is still considered part of to the Greater Kitakyushu Metropolitan Area. However, as the demand for coal decreased due to the energy revolution, the coal mines that had sponsored prosperity have closed, leading to depopulation.

== Education ==
Kama has eight public elementary schools and five public junior high schools and two public high schools operated by the Fukuoka Prefectural Board of Education. The prefecture also operates one special education school for the handicapped.

== Transportation ==
=== Railways ===
JR Kyushu - Gotōji Line

JJ Shimo-Kamoo

=== Highways ===
- Kyushu Expressway
- Oita Expressway
- Higashikyushu Expressway
- National Route 211
- National Route 322

== Notable people from Kama ==
- Hifumi Katō (born 1940), retired Japanese professional shogi player who achieved the rank of 9-dan
- Katsuto Momii (born 1943), Japanese businessman who was elected as NHK's 21st Director-General
- Kōji Seto (born 1988), Japanese actor, singer and member of D-BOYS
- Emi Takanabe (born 1985), Japanese swimmer, who specialized in freestyle events
- Kōhei Tsuka (1948–2010), Korean-Japanese playwright, theater director, and screenwriter (Real Name: Kim Pongung, Hangul: 김봉웅)
