= Fukuoka 1st district =

Legislative district of Japan

Fukuoka 1st District
- Parliamentary constituency for the Japanese House of Representatives
- Numbered map of Fukuoka Prefecture single-member districts
- Prefecture: Fukuoka
- Proportional District: Kyushu
- Electorate: 455,222

Current constituency
- Created: 1994
- Seats: One
- Party: LDP
- Representative: Takahiro Inoue

Fukuoka 1st district (福岡[県第]1区, Fukuoka[-ken dai-]ichi-ku) is a single-member constituency of the House of Representatives in the Diet of Japan. The constituency consists of Higashi and Hakata wards of Fukuoka City.

== History ==
In the past, Ryu Matsumoto of DP was an unrivaled candidate. However, he lost to Takahiro Inoue of LDP in the 2012 Japanese general election following a controversial remark he made while serving as Minister of Reconstruction.
At the time, Yūji Shinkai, also an LDP member, was interested in running in the district. Therefore, LDP decided to nominate Inoue and Shinkai as independent candidates and nominate the winning candidate. Inoue ultimately won the election, and has since maintained a stable record of victory.

== List of representatives ==
Election	Representative	Party	Notes
1996	Ryu Matsumoto	Democratic	
2000	Ryu Matsumoto	Democratic	
2003	Ryu Matsumoto	Democratic	
2005	Ryu Matsumoto	Democratic	
2009	Ryu Matsumoto	Democratic	
2012	Takahiro Inoue	LDP	
2014	Takahiro Inoue	Independent	
2017	Takahiro Inoue	LDP	
2021	Takahiro Inoue	LDP	
2024	Takahiro Inoue	LDP	
2026	Takahiro Inoue	LDP	

== Election results ==
=== 2026 ===
2026
Party	Candidate	Votes	%	±%
LDP	Takahiro Inoue (Incumbent)	106,865	48.3	▲13.09
Centrist Reform	Keisuke Maruo	46,236	20.9	▼6.75
Sanseitō	Keiko Yoshitomi	32,095	14.5	▲5.07
Ishin	Gōsei Yamamoto	26,630	12.0	▼5.16
JCP	Yoshitaka Iwamoto	9,547	4.3	▼2.25
Majority		60,629	27.4	▲19.87
Registered electors		445,817		
Turnout		221,373	50.58	▲3.60
LDP hold				

=== 2024 ===
2024
Party	Candidate	Votes	%	±%
LDP	Takahiro Inoue (Incumbent)	70,408	35.18	▼12.33
CDP	Keisuke Maruo	55,343	27.65	▲1.96
Ishin	Gōsei Yamamoto	34,346	17.16	▼0.81
Sanseitō	Kie Ogata	18,872	9.43	New
JCP	Hidehiko Watanuki	13,107	6.55	▼2.28
Social Democratic	Shunichi Murata	8,067	4.03	New
Majority		15,065	7.53	
Registered electors		440,719		
Turnout			46.98	▼0.58
LDP hold				

=== 2021 ===
2021
Party	Candidate	Votes	%	±%
LDP	Takahiro Inoue (Incumbent)	99,430	47.51	▼1.66
CDP	Susumu Tsubota	53,755	25.69	New
Ishin	Gōsei Yamamoto (Won PR seat)	37,604	17.97	New
JCP	Takuji Kimura	18,487	8.83	▲1.72
Majority		45,675	21.82	
Registered electors		453,215		
Turnout			47.56	▼0.36
LDP hold				

=== 2017 ===
2017
Party	Candidate	Votes	%	±%
LDP	Takahiro Inoue (Incumbent)	97,777	49.17	N/A
CDP	Gōsei Yamamoto	51,063	25.68	New
Kibō no Tō	Hidetoshi Ishii	35,870	18.04	New
JCP	Takahiko Tachikawa	14,158	7.11	▼4.40
Majority		46,714	23.49	
Registered electors		433,508		
Turnout			47.92	▲4.74
LDP hold				

=== 2014 ===
2014
Party	Candidate	Votes	%	±%
Independent	Takahiro Inoue (Incumbent)	59,712	36.34	New
Democratic	Gōsei Yamamoto	42,960	26.15	▲7.84
Independent	Yūji Shinkai	31,087	18.92	New
JCP	Toshikazu Hiejima	18,906	11.51	▲3.52
Independent	Kōko Kanaide	6,764	4.12	New
Future Party	Kentaro Akashi	4,883	2.96	New
Majority		16,752	10.19	
Registered electors		407,501		
Turnout			43.18	▼9.37
Independent hold				

=== 2012 ===
2012
Party	Candidate	Votes	%	±%
LDP	Takahiro Inoue	96,706	48.33	▲10.43
Your	Hibiki Takeuchi	45,014	22.50	New
Democratic	Ryu Matsumoto (Incumbent)	36,632	18.31	▼34.47
JCP	Toshikazu Hiejima	15,992	7.99	▲0.27
Independent	Katsuko Inumaru	5,762	2.87	New
Majority		51,692	25.83	
Registered electors				
Turnout			52.55	
LDP gain from Democratic				

=== 2009 ===
2009
Party	Candidate	Votes	%	±%
Democratic	Ryu Matsumoto (Incumbent)	123,441	52.78	▲5.51
LDP	Nobuhiko Endō	88,648	37.90	▼6.03
JCP	Yutaka Uchida	18,046	7.72	▼1.08
Happiness Realization	Dōshū Miyazaki	3,753	1.60	New
Majority		34,793	14.88	
Registered electors				
Turnout				
Democratic hold				

=== 2005 ===
2005
Party	Candidate	Votes	%	±%
Democratic	Ryu Matsumoto (Incumbent)	99,939	47.27	▼7.29
LDP	Nobuhiko Endō (Won PR seat)	92,891	43.93	▲12.47
JCP	Hidekazu Hishimoto	18,611	8.80	▼0.55
Majority		7,048	3.34	
Registered electors				
Turnout				
Democratic hold				

=== 2003 ===
2003
Party	Candidate	Votes	%	±%
Democratic	Ryu Matsumoto (Incumbent)	92,969	54.56	▲8.23
LDP	Taisuke Tominaga	53,611	31.46	▼7.12
JCP	Hisayo Oshima	15,940	9.35	▼1.74
Independent	Yutaka Fujimoto	4,179	2.45	New
Independent	Ikuko Itō	3,711	2.18	New
Majority		39,358	23.10	
Registered electors				
Turnout				
Democratic hold				

=== 2000 ===
2000
Party	Candidate	Votes	%	±%
Democratic	Ryu Matsumoto (Incumbent)	82,241	46.33	New
LDP	Tōji Nishida	68,483	38.58	▲3.06
JCP	Sawako Ōga	19,690	11.09	▼2.58
Liberal League	Mika Ishida	7,101	4.00	New
Majority		13,758	7.75	
Registered electors				
Turnout				
Democratic hold				

=== 1996 ===
1996
Party	Candidate	Votes	%	±%
Democratic	Ryu Matsumoto	74,537	46.66	New
LDP	Tōji Nishida	56,748	35.52	New
JCP	Sawako Ōga	21,839	13.67	New
Minor Party	Minoru Yamaguchi	6,629	4.15	New
Majority		17,789	11.14	
Registered electors				
Turnout				
Democratic win (new seat)				
