= Fukuoka 8th district =

Legislative district of Japan

Fukuoka 8th District
- Parliamentary constituency for the Japanese House of Representatives
- Prefecture: Fukuoka Prefecture
- Proportional Block: Kyushu
- Electorate: 347,369 (as of September 2022)

Current constituency
- Created: 1994
- Seats: One
- Party: LDP
- Representative: Taro Aso

Fukuoka 8th district (福岡県第8区, Fukuoka-ken dai-hachi-ku) is a single-member constituency of the House of Representatives in the Diet of Japan. It covers Northern central parts of Fukuoka including the city of Iizuka, home to the Asō family (Asō Corp./KK) and Tarō Asō, Liberal Democratic Party (LDP) faction leader and the only representative for the 8th district since its creation. He was elected LDP president in 2008 against Kaoru Yosano (without faction) and three other candidates, but resigned one year later following the most devastating general election result in party history – his successor would be the second LDP president in history not to become prime minister after his election. Yet, Asō carried his own district by an overwhelming margin in 2009.

In detail, the district consists of the cities of Nōgata, Iizuka, Kama, Nakama, Miyawaka and the districts of Onga, Kurate and Kaho. As of 2012, 367,966 eligible voters were registered in the district.

Before the electoral reform of 1994, the area had been part of the multi-member Fukuoka 2nd district that elected five Representatives by single non-transferable vote, among them from 1979 to 1983 and since 1986 Tarō Asō.

== List of representatives ==
Representative	Party	Years served	Notes
Tarō Asō	LDP	1996–	Incumbent

== Election results ==
2026
Party	Candidate	Votes	%	±%
LDP	Tarō Asō	111,727	67.5	▲10.53
Reiwa	Rie Okizono	27,965	16.9	
Independent	Toshifumi Morita	25,752	15.6	▼5.58
LDP hold				

2024
Party	Candidate	Votes	%	±%
LDP	Tarō Asō	92,534	56.97	▼2.66
JCP	Shoko Kawano	35,493	21.85	▲0.21
Independent	Toshifumi Morita	24,407	21.18	New
LDP hold		Swing	▼1.44	

2021
Party	Candidate	Votes	%	±%
LDP	Tarō Asō	104,924	59.63	
JCP	Sachiko Kohno	38,083	21.64	
LDP hold		Swing		

2017
Party	Candidate	Votes	%	±%
LDP	Tarō Asō	135,334	72.2	
JCP	Tsuyoko Miyajima	52,207	27.8	
LDP hold		Swing		

2012
Party	Candidate	Votes	%	±%
LDP	Tarō Asō	146,712	68.4	
Democratic	Gōsei Yamamoto	46,213	21.5	
JCP	Takao Arai	21,678	10.1	
LDP hold		Swing		

2009
Party	Candidate	Votes	%	±%
LDP	Tarō Asō	165,327	62.2	
Democratic (People's New)	Gōsei Yamamoto (elected by PR)	96,327	36.2	
Happiness Realization	Yūko Ōtsuka	4,095	1.5	
Turnout		271,173	72.69	
LDP hold		Swing		

2005
Party	Candidate	Votes	%	±%
LDP	Tarō Asō	145,229	56.9	
Democratic	Kusuo Ōshima	87,856	34.4	
JCP	Kazuyuki Watanabe	22,176	8.7	
Turnout		262,166	69.34	
LDP hold		Swing		

2003
Party	Candidate	Votes	%	±%
LDP	Tarō Asō	132,646	57.7	
Democratic	Kusuo Ōshima	75,879	33.0	
JCP	Kazuyuki Watanabe	21,272	9.3	
Turnout		237,626	62.82	
LDP hold		Swing		

2000
Party	Candidate	Votes	%	±%
LDP	Tarō Asō	120,178	49.9	
Democratic	Junsuke Iwata	65,280	27.1	
JCP	Masako Sakamoto	26,266	10.9	
Social Democratic	Kazuhiro Ōtsuka	25,021	10.4	
Liberal League	Mieko Yamamoto	4,029	1.7	
LDP hold		Swing		

1996
Party	Candidate	Votes	%	±%
LDP	Tarō Asō	114,408	50.5	
Democratic	Junsuke Iwata	80,974	35.7	
JCP	Bunkichi Honda	31,206	13.8	
Turnout		234,762	63.14	
LDP win (new seat)				

House of Representatives (Japan)
Preceded by Gunma 4th district	Constituency represented by the prime minister 2008–2009	Succeeded by Hokkaido 9th district
