= Gōsei Yamamoto =

Japanese politician

- 山本 剛正
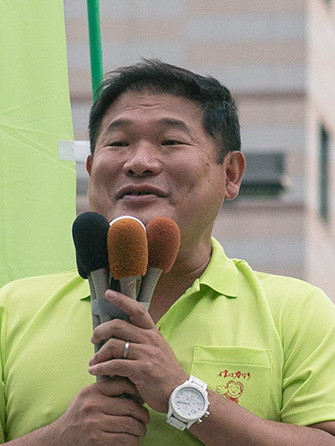
- Yamamoto in 2022

Member of the House of Representatives
- In office 5 November 2021 – 9 October 2024
- Constituency: Kyushu PR
- In office 30 August 2009 – 16 November 2012
- Constituency: Kyushu PR

Personal details
- Born: 1 January 1972 (age 54) Shinjuku, Tokyo, Japan
- Party: Innovation (since 2021)
- Other political affiliations: JNP (1992–1994); DPJ (2009–2016); DP (2016–2017); CDP (2017–2019); Independent (2019–2021)
- Spouse: Masami Nishimura
- Education: Komazawa University

Gōsei Yamamoto is a Japanese politician and a former member of the House of Representatives.

== Career ==
He was born in Tokyo. Graduated from Komazawa University's Faculty of Business Administration. He joined the Japan New Party (JNP) shortly after it was established while attending university and participated in the election campaign. After the withdrawal of JNP, he joined Tokihiro Nakamura, a member of the House of Representatives (later governor of Ehime Prefecture) and joined Itochu Enex. He resigned and served as secretary to Shinji Tarutoko, who was a member of the House of Representatives. Also, he served as secretary to Tsutomu Okubo, who was a member of the House of Councilors.

In the 2009 Japanese general election, he was the Democratic Party candidate for the Fukuoka 8th district. Though he got 69,000 votes, he lost to Taro Aso, who was then Prime Minister. Later, he was elected to Kyushu proportional representation block, and was elected for the first time. In the 2012 Japanese general election, Gōsei lost to Aso by more than 100,000 votes and failed to win the election.

In the 2014 Japanese general election, he ran for office in the Fukuoka 1st district. Since two former members of the Liberal Democratic Party (LDP) ran for office as independents, Gōsei was likely to win the conservative split. But he lost to Takahiro Inoue.
