= Masami Nishimura =

Japanese politician

- 西村 正美

Member of the House of Councillors
- In office 26 July 2010 – 25 July 2016
- Constituency: National PR

Personal details
- Born: 20 October 1963 (age 63) Nakano, Tokyo, Japan
- Party: Democratic (2009–2016)
- Other political affiliations: Liberal (2001–2009); Democratic (2016–2017)
- Spouse: Gōsei Yamamoto
- Education: The Nippon Dental University
- Occupation: Odontologist and politician
- Website: Website

Masami Nishimura (西村正美, Nishimura Masami; born 20 October 1963) is a former Japanese politician from the Democratic Party of Japan. She served as member of the House of Councillors from 2010 to 2016 as a national proportional representative.
