= Takahiro Inoue =

Japanese politician

- 井上 貴博
- Official portrait, 2025

Special Advisor to the Prime Minister (in charge of Regional Future Strategy)
- In office 21 October 2025 – 17 September 2026 Serving with Midori Matsushima, Takashi Endo, Yoshimasa Uno, Sadamasa Oue
- Prime Minister: Sanae Takaichi
- Preceded by: Akihisa Nagashima; Masafumi Mori; Wakako Yata
- Succeeded by: Hajime Sasaki

Member of the House of Representatives
- Incumbent
- Assumed office 17 December 2012
- Preceded by: Ryu Matsumoto
- Constituency: Fukuoka 1st

Member of the Fukuoka Prefectural Assembly
- In office 2003–2012
- Constituency: Hakata-ku, Fukuoka

Personal details
- Born: 2 April 1962 (age 64) Hakata-ku, Fukuoka, Japan
- Party: Liberal Democratic (Shikōkai)
- Education: Dokkyo University
- Website: Takahiro Inoue website

Takahiro Inoue (井上 貴博, Inoue Takahiro; born 2 April 1962) is a Japanese politician of the Liberal Democratic Party, who serves as a member of the House of Representatives.

== Political career ==
In April 2003, he ran for the Fukuoka Prefectural Assembly election and was elected. He then won three consecutive terms in 2007 and 2011.

In the 2012 general election, LDP's Fukuoka prefectural federation endorsed Yūji Shinkai, Former Secretary of Makoto Koga, as a candidate for Fukuoka 1st to the LDP headquarters. However, former PM Minister Tarō Asō, who has a feud with Koga, expressed disapproval of Shinkai's candidacy. Therefore, LDP President Shinzo Abe nominated Takahiro Inoue as a candidate and Shinkai would run in the Kyushu PR block. As a result of election, Inoue defeated DPJ Incumbent Ryu Matsumoto, Former minister of Reconstruction.

In the 2014 general election, there was a conflict within the LDP's Fukuoka prefectural federation over whether Inoue or Shinkai would be the candidate for Fukuoka 1st. LDP headquarters said it would not nominate either Inoue or Shinkai, but would nominate a winner of the constituency additionally. As a result of the election, Inoue won and held his seat.

In the 2017 general election, Inoue won for the third time.

In 2018, Asō, Minister of Finance, appointed Inoue as a Finance Minister's Advisor and Inoue was mainly in charge of preparing for the G20 Finance Ministers and Central Bank Governors' Meeting to be held in Fukuoka City in 2019.

In the 2021 general election, Inoue won for the fourth time.

In the 2024 general election, Inoue won the election for the fifth time after a close race with the CDP’s Keisuke Maruo.

In October 2025, PM Sanae Takaichi appointed Inoue as a special advisor to the PM.

In the 2026 general election, Inoue won a landslide victory over the vote to hold his seat.
