= Usui, Fukuoka =

Dissolved municipality in Fukuoka prefecture, Japan

Usui (碓井町, Usui-machi) was a town located in Kaho District, Fukuoka Prefecture, Japan.

As of 2003, the town had an estimated population of 6,287 and a density of 744.02 persons per km^{2}. The total area was 8.45 km^{2}.

On March 27, 2006, Usui, along with the city of Yamada, and the towns of Inatsuki and Kaho (all from Kaho District), was merged to create the city of Kama.
