= Chikuho, Fukuoka =

Former town in Fukuoka Prefecture, Japan

Chikuho (筑穂町, Chikuho-machi) was a town located in Kaho District, Fukuoka Prefecture, Japan.

As of 2003, the town had an estimated population of 11,009 and a density of 147.16 persons per km^{2}. The total area was 74.81 km^{2}.

On March 26, 2006, Chikuho, along with the towns of Honami, Kaita and Shōnai (all from Kaho District), was merged into the expanded city of Iizuka.

== Primary and secondary schools ==
The city formerly had a North Korean school, Chikuho Korean Elementary School (筑豊朝鮮初級学校).
