= Inatsuki, Fukuoka =

Municipality in Fukuoka prefecture, Japan

Inatsuki (稲築町, Inatsuki-machi) was a town located in Kaho District, Fukuoka Prefecture, Japan.

As of 2003, the town had an estimated population of 19,535 and a density of 1,126.59 persons per km^{2}. The total area was 17.34 km^{2}.

On March 27, 2006, Inatsuki, along with the city of Yamada, and the towns of Kaho and Usui (all from Kaho District), was merged to create the city of Kama.
