= Yamada, Fukuoka =

Dissolved municipality in Fukuoka prefecture, Japan

Yamada (山田市, Yamada-shi) was a city located in central Fukuoka Prefecture, Japan. The city was founded on April 1, 1954. It was formerly a coal-mining town.

As of 2006, the city had an estimated population of 12,000. The total area was approximately 22.05 km^{2}.

On March 27, 2006, Yamada, along with the towns of Inatsuki, Kaho and Usui (all from Kaho District), was merged to create the city of Kama.
