= Kaho, Fukuoka =

Dissolved municipality in Fukuoka prefecture, Japan

Kaho (嘉穂町, Kaho-machi) was a town located in Kaho District, Fukuoka Prefecture, Japan.

As of 2003, the town had an estimated population of 9,965 and a density of 114.09 persons per km^{2}. The total area was 87.34 km^{2}.

On March 27, 2006, Kaho, along with the city of Yamada, and the towns of Inatsuki and Usui (all from Kaho District), was merged to create the city of Kama.
