= Kaita, Fukuoka =

Former town in Fukuoka Prefecture, Japan

Kaita (頴田町, Kaita-machi) was a town located in Kaho District, Fukuoka Prefecture, Japan, established in 1959. Since 2006, the former Kaita-machi occupies the northeastern part of Iizuka City.

The eastern part of the former town is a hilly area with Tertiary layer and granite. The western part is where the Onga River branches into the Shonai River, and the Japan National Route 200 and National Route 201 pass through.

Originally a coal mining town, population decline was steepest in the 1970s following the closure of coal mines in the area. The construction of residential complexes in subsequent years led to a gradual increase in population. As of 2003, the town had an estimated population of 7,043 and a density of 424.28 persons per km^{2}. The total area was 16.60 km^{2}.

On March 26, 2006, Kaita, along with the towns of Chikuho, Honami, and Shōnai (all from Kaho District), was merged into the expanded city of Iizuka.
