= Honami, Fukuoka =

Town in Fukuoka Prefecture, Japan

Honami (穂波町, Honami-machi) was a town located in Kaho District, Fukuoka Prefecture, Japan.

As of 2003, the town had an estimated population of 26,268 and a density of 1,041.14 persons per km^{2}. The total area was 25.23 km^{2}.

On March 26, 2006, Honami, along with the towns of Chikuho, Kaita and Shōnai (all from Kaho District), was merged into the expanded city of Iizuka.
