= Kaho Iwano =

Japanese water polo player

Personal information
- Nationality: Japanese
- Born: 6 August 1999 (age 27)
- Height: 166 cm (65 in)
- Weight: 62 kg (137 lb)

Sport
- Sport: Water polo

Kaho Iwano (岩野 夏帆; born 6 August 1999) is a Japanese water polo player. She was selected to the Japan women's national water polo team, for the 2020 Summer Olympics.

She participated in the 2019 Summer Universiade.

She plays for Shumei University.
