= Kaho District, Fukuoka =

District in Fukuoka prefecture, Japan

Coordinates: 33.5812°N 130.6793°E

Location of Kaho District in Fukuoka Prefecture

Kaho (嘉穂郡, Kaho-gun) is a district located in Fukuoka Prefecture, Japan. The district was formed in 1896.

As of 2006, the district has an estimated population of 14,648 and a density of 729.85 persons per km^{2}. The total area is 20.07 km^{2}.

== Towns and villages ==
- Keisen

== Mergers ==
- On March 26, 2006 the towns of Chikuho, Honami, Kaita and Shōnai merged with the former city of Iizuka to form the new city, also called Iizuka.
- On March 27, 2006 the towns of Inatsuki, Kaho and Usui merged with the old city of Yamada to form the new city of Kama.
