= Wakato Bridge =

Coordinates: 33°54′09″N 130°49′02″E

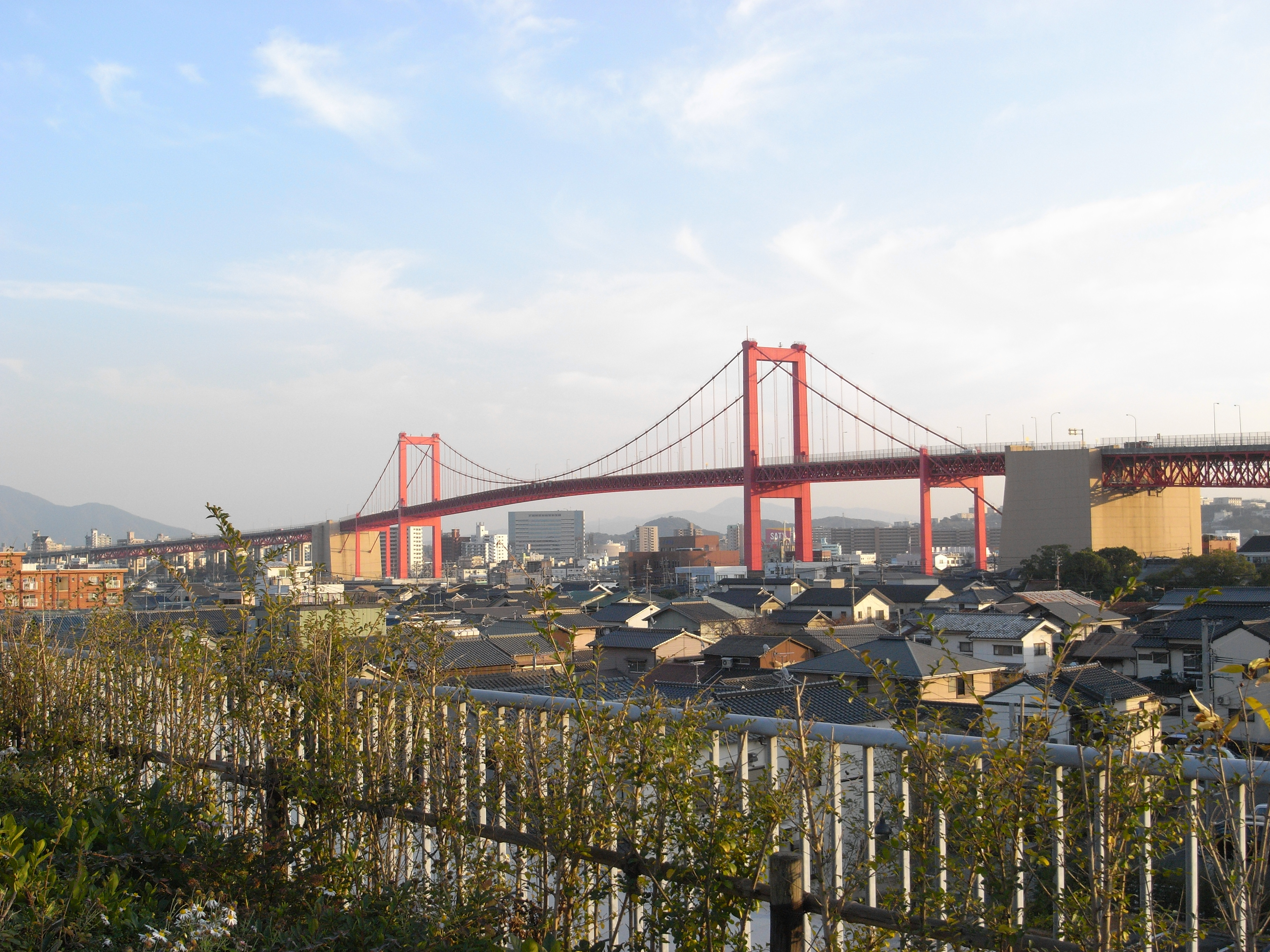
Wakato Bridge as seen from Tobata, Kitakyushu

The Wakato Bridge (若戸大橋, Wakato Ōhashi; lit. "Great Waka-To Bridge), is a suspension bridge in Kitakyūshū, Fukuoka, Japan. The bridge opened on September 26, 1962, and it spans a length of two kilometers and has a main span of 367 meters. The name of the bridge comes from the characters of the Kitakyūshū wards of Wakamatsu (若松) and Tobata (戸畑) that the bridge connects across Dōkai Bay.

== History ==
The bridge passed into the control of Kitakyūshū on September 30, 2005.

== Wakato Ferry ==
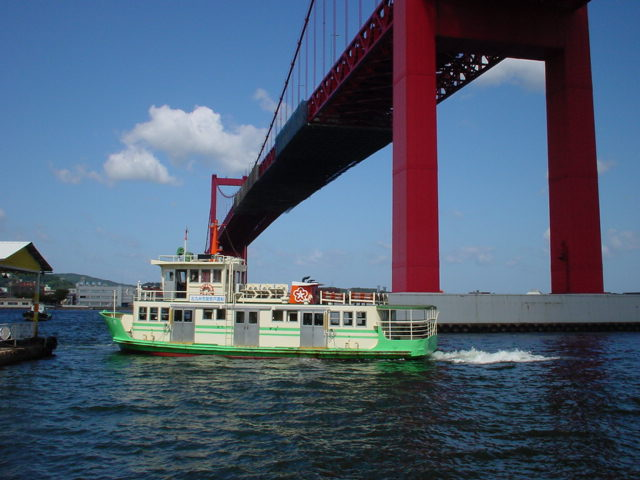
The Wakato ferry beneath Wakato Bridge

The Wakato ferry existed before the bridge was built; it has been retained by the city for pedestrians and cyclists, as the bridge is nowadays reserved for motor vehicle traffic only, since a large number of suicides has occurred from its deck. The three-minute journey costs 100 yen each way for adults, and 50 yen for children and older people. Bicycles can be transported for an additional 100 yen.

== In popular culture ==
The space monster Dogora, lifted and destroyed the bridge in the 1964 Toho dai Kaiju movie Space Monster Dogora.

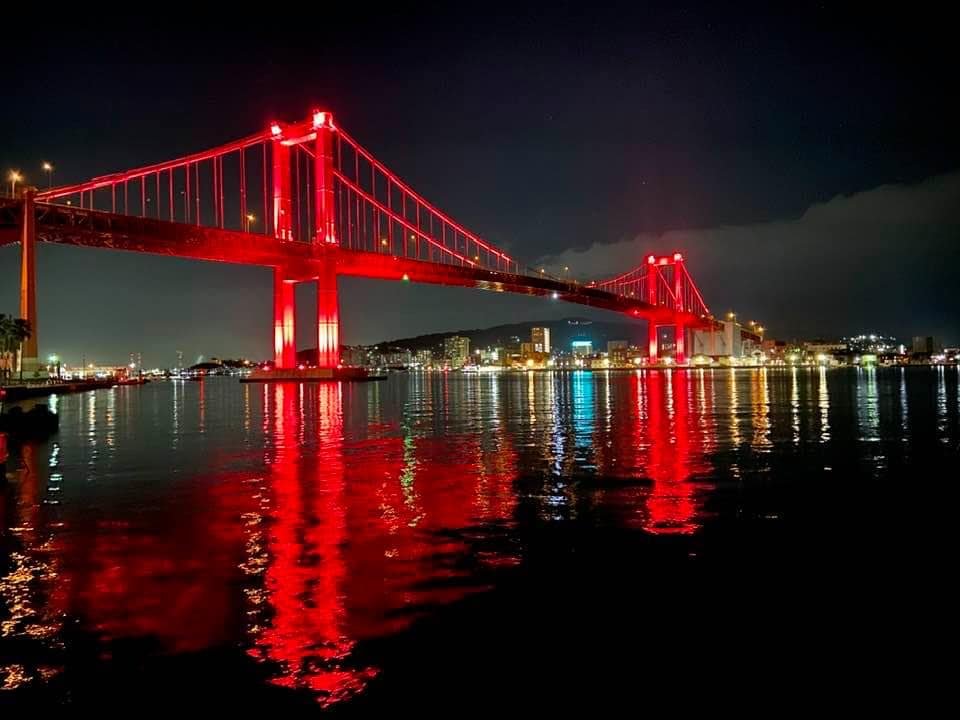
Wakato Ohashi night view
