= Yahatahigashi-ku =

Ward of Kitakyūshū in Kyūshū, Japan

Coordinates: 33°51′49″N 130°48′43″E

Location of Yahatahigashi-ku in Kitakyūshū

Yahatahigashi-ku (八幡東区) is a ward of Kitakyūshū, Fukuoka, Japan. It is the second smallest ward in Kitakyūshū after Tobata ward at only 36.36 square kilometres. Residents have a very high average age, one of the highest in Japan. The population was 77,077 at the end of September 2003.

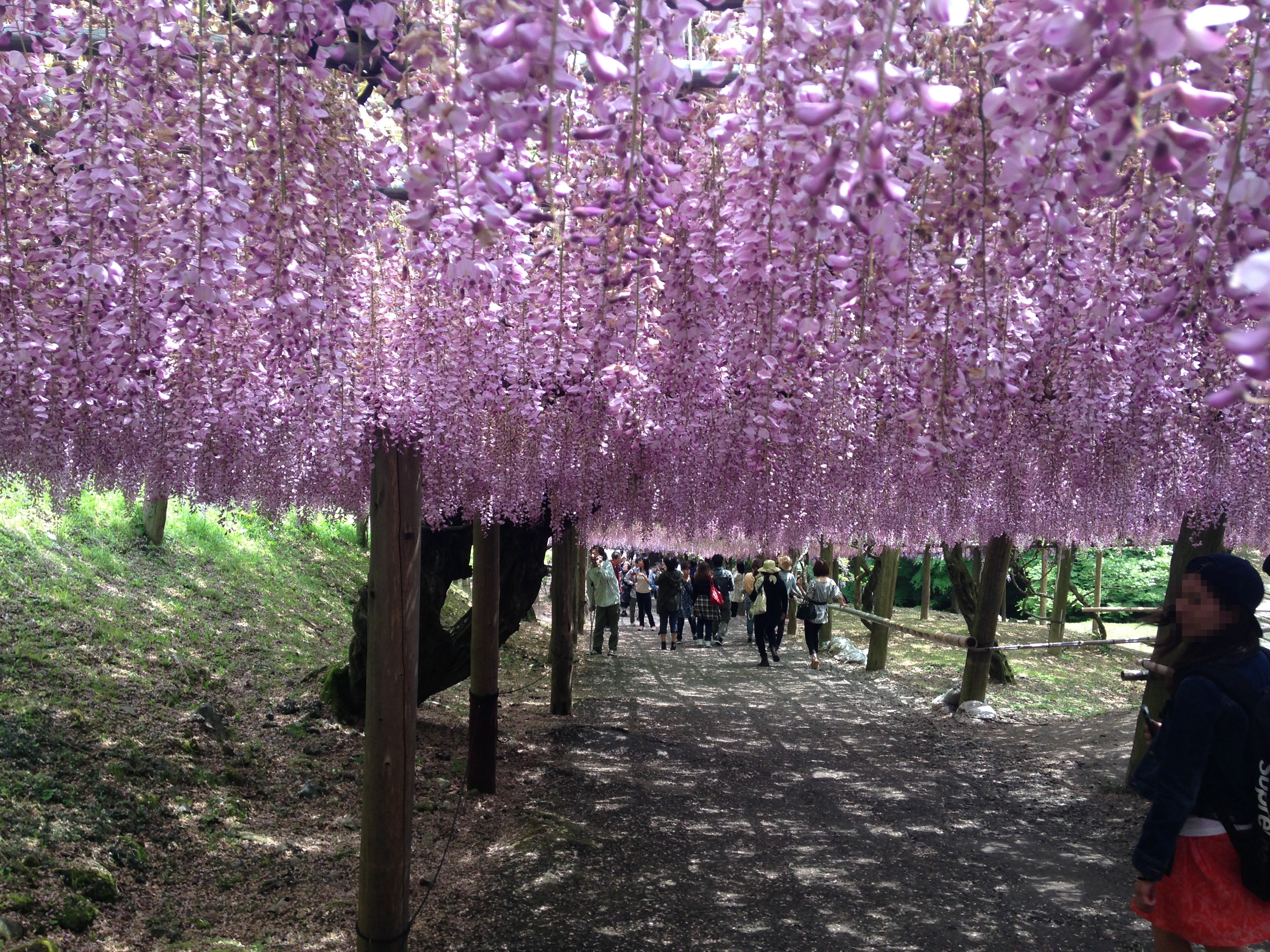
A wisteria tunnel in Kawachi Wisteria Garden

== Facilities ==
The ward contains the now-closed Space World amusement park. It also contains the Kawachi Dam, built to provide cooling water for the Yahata steelworks in the 1920s. When the dam was built, it was the largest in Asia.

An onsen (hot spring) facility, Ajisai no Yu, has recently been built and includes outdoor bathing (rotenburo).
