= Chikushi =

Chikushi can refer to:

== Places ==
- Chikushi District, Fukuoka Fukuoka Prefecture, Japan
- Chikushi Station in Kyushu, Japan
- Chikushi Jogakuen University a private women's college
- Higashi Chikushi Junior College a private junior women's college

== People ==
- Tetsuya Chikushi (筑紫 哲也; 1935–2008), Japanese journalist, TV presenter and news anchor

== Others ==
- 6237 Chikushi, an asteroid
