= Kitakyushu =

Kitakyushu 北九州市
- Designated city
- City of Kitakyushu
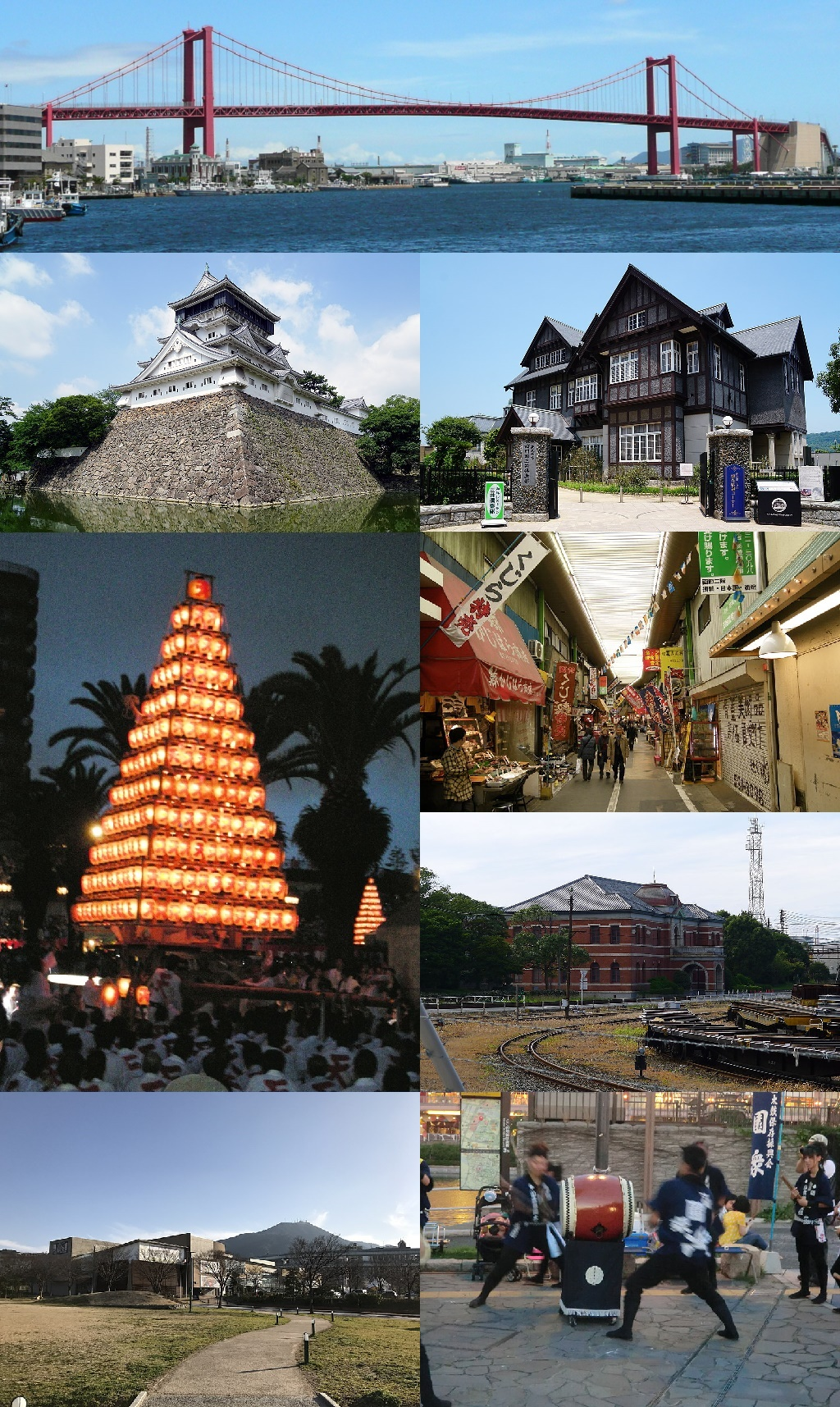
- Clockwise from top left: Wakato Bridge; Moji; Tanga Market; Former Yahata Steel Works; Kokura Gion Daiko; Kitakyushu Museum of Natural History & Human History; Tobata Gion Yamagasa festival; and Kokura Castle

- Flag Emblem
- Location of Kitakyushu in Fukuoka Prefecture

- Location within Kitakyushu Location in Fukuoka Location in Kyushu Location in Japan
- Coordinates: 33°53′N 130°53′E
- Country: Japan
- Region: Kyushu
- Prefecture: Fukuoka Prefecture

Government
  - Mayor: Kazuhisa Takeuchi

Area
  - Total: 491.95 km^{2} (189.94 sq mi)

Population (June 1, 2025)
  - Total: 902,358
  - Density: 1,834.2/km^{2} (4,750.7/sq mi)
- Time zone: UTC+09:00 (JST)
- City hall address: 1-1 Jōnai, Kokura Kita-ku, Kitakyushu-shi, Fukuoka-ken; 803-8501
- Climate: Cfa
- Website: www.city.kitakyushu.lg.jp
- Symbols
- Flower: Tsutsuji (Azalea); Himawari (Sunflower)
- Tree: Ichiigashi (Japanese beech)

Kitakyushu (北九州市, Kitakyūshū-shi; Japanese pronunciation: [kʲi̥.ta.kʲɯꜜː.ɕɯː, kʲi̥.ta.kʲɯː.ɕɯꜜː.ɕi]) is a city in Fukuoka Prefecture, Japan. In 2019, Kitakyushu had an estimated population of 940,978, making it the second-largest city in Fukuoka Prefecture and on the island of Kyushu, after the city of Fukuoka. It is one of Japan's 20 designated cities, one of three on Kyushu, and is divided into seven wards.

Sited at the northern tip of Kyushu, Kitakyushu was formed in 1963 from a merger of municipalities centered on the historic city of Kokura; its name means "North Kyushu". It is located on the Kanmon Straits which separate Kyushu from Honshu, and faces the city of Shimonoseki in Yamaguchi Prefecture. Kitakyushu and Shimonoseki are connected by numerous transport links including the Kanmon Bridge and the Kanmon Tunnels (Roadway, Railway, and Shin-Kanmon).

Kitakyushu's Urban Employment Area forms part of the Fukuoka-Kitakyushu Greater Metropolitan Region, which, with a population of 5,738,977 (2005–2006), is the largest metropolitan area in Japan west of the Keihanshin region. The city is known as one of Japan's foremost industrial areas, centred on the historic Yahata Steel Works, which is now a UNESCO World Heritage Site.

== History ==
=== Establishment ===
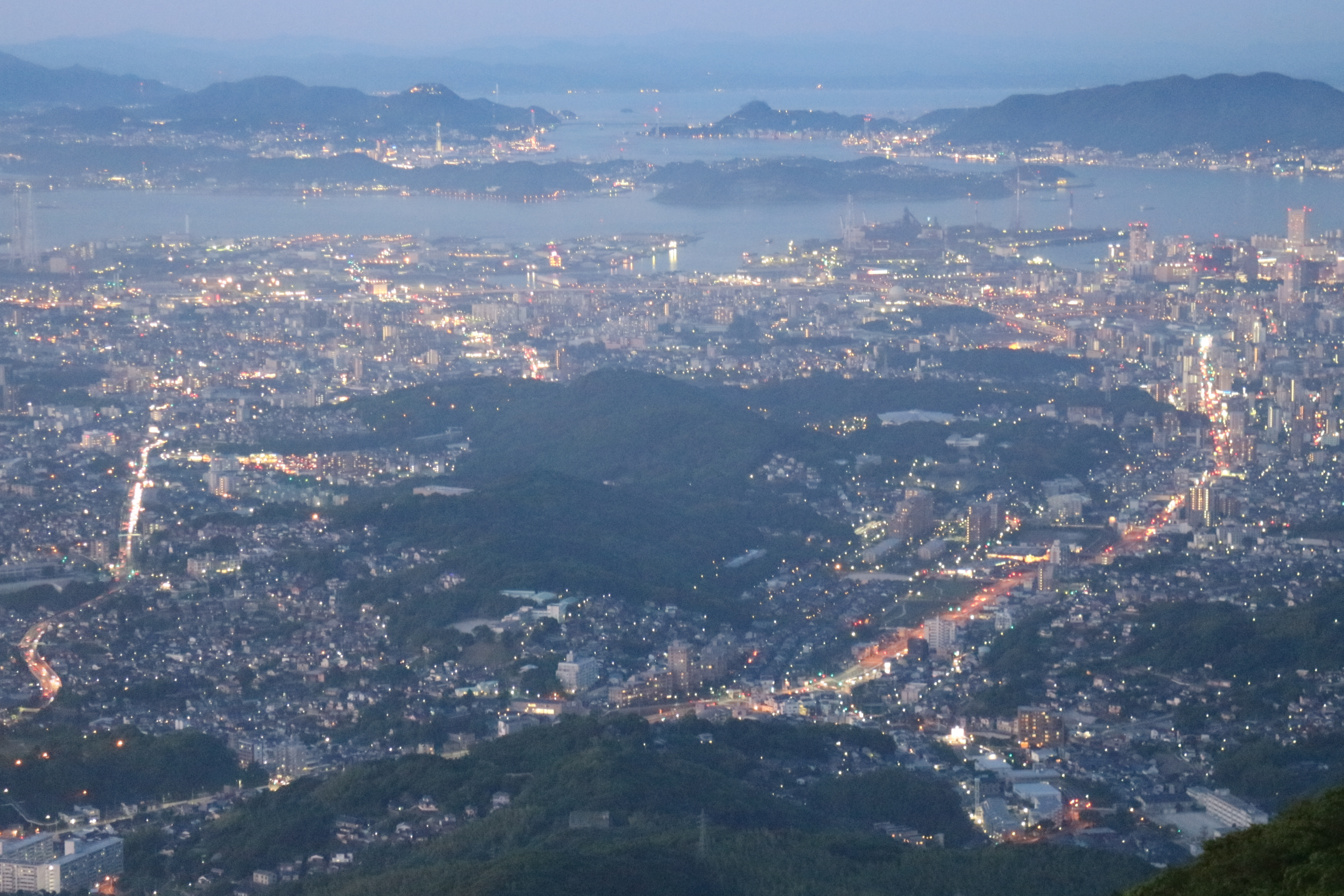
View of the city from Mount Sarakura, with the Kanmon Straits in the background.

The city of Kitakyushu was established on February 10, 1963, as an agglomeration of the five cities of Moji, Kokura, Wakamatsu, Yahata, and Tobata. It was elevated to the status of designated city on April 1 of that year, becoming the first such city outside of the Tokyo, Osaka, and Nagoya metropolitan areas. At the time of its foundation, it had a population of more than one million people, and until it was overtaken by the city of Fukuoka in 1979, it was Kyushu's most populous city. Kitakyushu's current administrative, economic and transport hub is located in Kokurakita-ku, the heart of the former Kokura city. It is centred around Kokura station, which is served by the San'yō Shinkansen high-speed railway, and is Kitakyushu's main shopping and entertainment district. The city's symbol mark is a flower with the Chinese character "north" (北, kita) in the middle and five petals representing the each of its constituent cities.

Because of its proximity to the Kanmon Straits, and by extension, the Japanese main island of Honshu, Kitakyushu has long served as the gateway to Kyushu, and as a transport hub. Kitakyushu is the starting point for Kyushu's railway and road network. In the Edo period, Kitakyushu was the northern terminus of the Nagasaki Kaidō, a highway linking Nagasaki, the only port in Japan open to foreign trade under the policy of sakoku, with Honshu. During the Meiji period, railways were constructed from the 1880s, along with the ports of Moji and Wakamatsu. Yahata, located on the Dōkai Bay, was originally nothing more than a fishing village. Its proximity to coal deposits in the surrounding Chikuhō region, and good sea links to sources of iron ore in China, led to it being chosen as the site for the Yahata Steel Works, which opened in 1901. This was the hub of Japan's nascent steel industry, and the surrounding area on the coast of the Dōkai Bay and Genkai Sea emerged as the focal point of Japan's pre-Second World War industrialisation. By 1913, Yahata was responsible for 85% of Japan's total steel output; the city's population grew from 6,652 in 1901 to 100,235 in 1920. In recognition of the area's contributions to Japan's industrial history, several historical sites in the city, including the head office of the steel works, were recognised by UNESCO in 2015 as part of the "Sites of Japan's Meiji Industrial Revolution: Iron and Steel, Shipbuilding and Coal Mining".

The five cities that now constitute Kitakyushu developed in competition with each other during Japan's period of industrialisation, and each carried its own unique industrial profile. With its railway and sea links, Moji, centred on Mojikō station, was a hub for international trade and food processing. Kokura, an old castle town, was known for its defence industry. Wakamatsu's railway and port complex served as the largest coal shipment hub in Japan. Yahata was dominated by the steel industry. Tobata was home to coal-related industries, textile plants, and a fishing industry. While they vary in size, each of the former cities retains its own urban centre to this day.

=== Second World War ===
Kitakyushu's character as the heart of Japanese industry made it a target for strategic bombing during the Second World War. 75 Boeing B-29 Superfortresses were despatched from mainland China to attack Yahata on June 16, 1944, in the first American bombing of the Japanese home islands. Kokura was the primary target of the nuclear weapon "Fat Man" on August 9, 1945. Major Charles Sweeney had orders to drop the bomb visually. All three attempts failed when he was unable to identify the target clearly due to clouds and smoke from Yahata, which had suffered air raids on the previous day. Additionally, a smoke screen was created by industrial workers burning barrels of coal tar and/or electric plant workers releasing steam. The bomb was ultimately dropped on the city of Nagasaki, the secondary target, at 11:02 JST.

=== Post-war ===
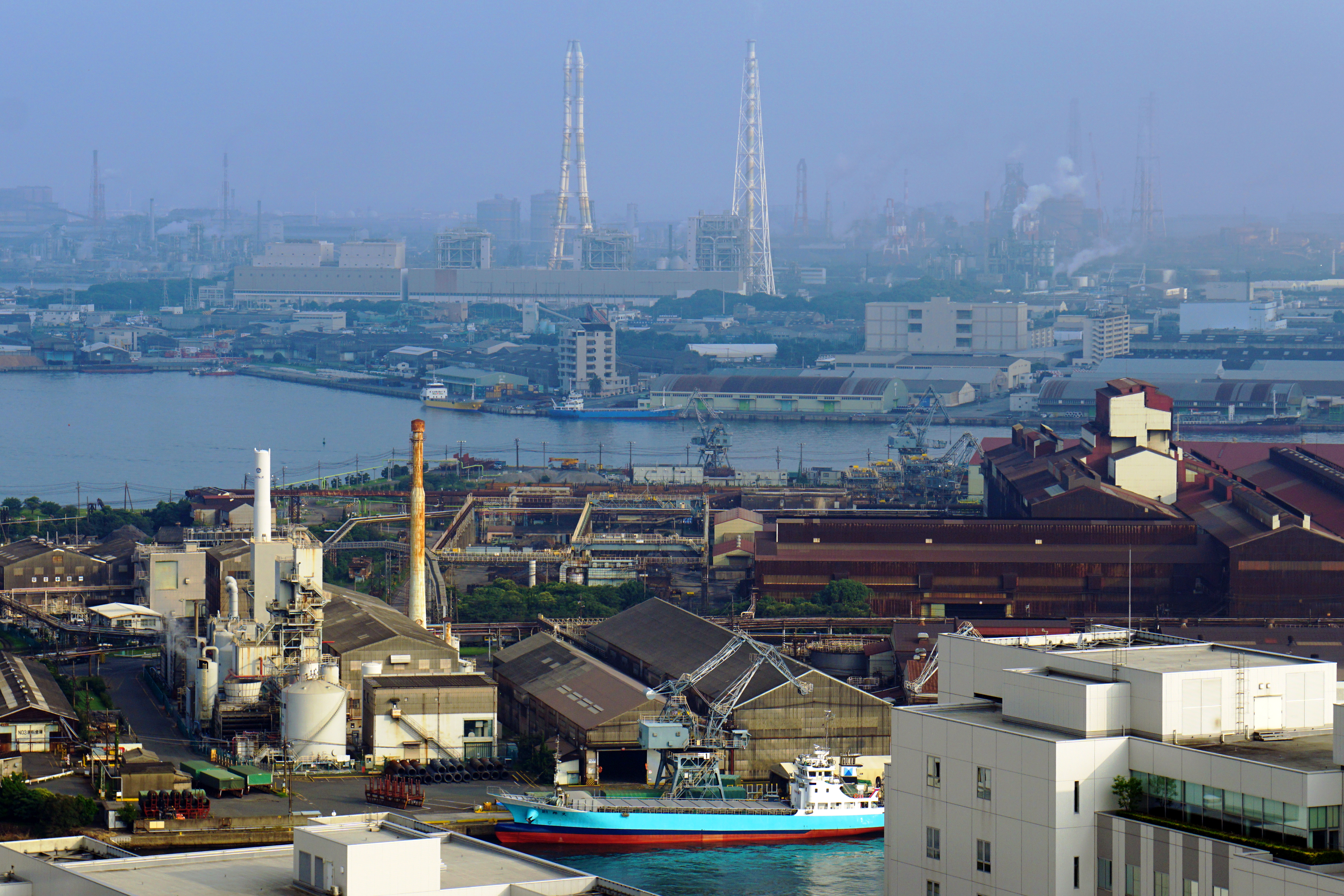
Yahata Steel Works in 2014

Extensive damage to industrial infrastructure during the war left the region in ruins, with residents suffering from malnutrition. Kitakyushu's industrial revival would come with the outbreak of the Korean War in 1950, when military demand for steel put production at the Yahata Steel Works into overdrive. In the following years, Kitakyushu's development continued to be driven by heavy industry, such as steel and metalworking, and these industries helped drive Japan's post-war economic boom. Like in other major Japanese cities, industrial development in Kitakyushu resulted in severe air and water pollution in the post-war period. In the 1960s, the Dōkai Bay was known as the "Sea of Death" due to severe water pollution caused by industrial runoff, which meant that no living organisms were present in its waters. Eventually this issue was overcome after activism by civic groups, such as the Tobata Women's Association, which resulted in public-private co-operation to curb pollution.

As heavy industries like steel began to decline in the 1970s due to factors such as the two oil shocks and tighter environmental regulations, Kitakyushu reoriented its economy toward the service sector. While steel and other industries continued to play a central role in Kitakyushu's economy, the number of people employed in these sectors sunk during the latter half of the twentieth century: over the period from 1965 to 1988, 27,713 jobs were lost in the iron and steel sector alone. With its history of overcoming pollution, Kitakyushu pivoted towards a new role as a centre for green industry, and now proclaims itself an "environmental city". The municipal government established the Kitakyushu Film Commission to attract the film and television industries to the city, promoting a further diversification of its economy. After a restructuring of the Yahata Steel Works by Nippon Steel, part of the complex was redeveloped into a theme park called Space World, which opened in 1990. This project aimed to improve the city's image, and promote tourism.

As a nexus of land and sea transport, Kitakyushu's tertiary (service) sector exceeded neighbouring Fukuoka's in scale until the end of the 1960s, and the regional branches of most Japanese companies, such as newspapers, banks, and trading firms, were located in the city. At the time, Kitakyushu was the economic heart of Kyushu. It was its largest industrial city, and home to vibrant secondary and tertiary sectors. This would change, however, with the modal shift from railway to air transport. Kitakyushu had no airport capable of handling large jet aircraft until the opening of Kitakyushu Airport in 2006; Fukuoka, on the other hand, has long been home to a major airport within its city limits. Businessmen travelling from Tokyo head offices to Kyushu now found Fukuoka a more convenient locale; when the San'yō Shinkansen opened with Hakata as its terminus in 1975, Fukuoka's status as an economic centre was elevated even further. As an example, the Yomiuri Shimbun moved its regional headquarters in western Japan from Kitakyushu to Fukuoka in 2004. While the regional branches of the Asahi and Mainichi newspapers have retained their corporate registration in Kitakyushu, actual operations have been moved to offices in Fukuoka.

The city was subject to decades of Yakuza-related violence and crime, to the point that it became known in Japan as "the city of never-ending conflict" (修羅の国, shura no kuni). A member of the Kudo-kai group threw a hand grenade into a crowded Kokura nightclub in August 2003, an incident that sparked a concerted effort to root out the violent groups and suppress criminal activity in the city. The number of criminal offences committed in Kitakyushu peaked in 2002, with 35,280 cases recorded in that year; by 2023, action taken by the local authorities brought the number of cases down by 87%, with only 5,109 recorded.

Kitakyushu's population peaked at 1,680,000 in 1979; even at the height of the bubble economy during the late 1980s, its population had started to decline slightly. With the Kitakyushu industrial area's decline in significance, the move towards a service economy, transfer of branch offices to Fukuoka, and the increasing concentration of people in areas with advanced educational facilities such as Fukuoka, Keihanshin, and Tokyo, Kitakyushu's population has continued to fall. In 2020, the city's ageing rate reached 30.6%, the worst of any designated city in Japan, and population decline is becoming a serious issue. However, suburbs such as Kanda and Yukuhashi have seen population increases, and there has been some growth in the urban centre of Kokurakita-ku. Furthermore, in 2023 and 2024, the number of businesses moving to Kitakyushu exceeded those who chose Fukuoka, and its startup rate rose to the highest across Japan.

== Geography and administrative divisions ==
=== Demographics ===
As of 1 October 2018, the city had an estimated population of 945,595 and a total area of 491.95 km^{2} (189.94 sq mi). The average population density is 1,922 persons /km^{2} (4,980/sq mi). It is now the country's 15th most populated city. It has a much larger total area than that of Fukuoka which is only 343.39 km^{2} (132.58 sq mi).

=== Wards ===
Kitakyushu is divided into seven wards (ku), whose boundaries are based on those of the five municipalities that joined to form the city in 1963. In 1974, the original Kokura-ku and Yahata-ku were divided into Kokurakita and Kokuraminami, and Yahatanishi and Yahatahigashi respectively.

Wards of Kitakyushu
	Place Name				Map of Kitakyushu wards
	Rōmaji	Kanji	Color	Land area in km^{2}	
1	Kokurakita-ku (administrative center)	小倉北区		39.27	
2	Kokuraminami-ku	小倉南区		170.25	
3	Moji-ku	門司区		73.37	
4	Tobata-ku	戸畑区		16.66	
5	Yahatahigashi-ku	八幡東区		36.36	
6	Yahatanishi-ku	八幡西区		83.04	
7	Wakamatsu-ku	若松区		67.86	

=== Cityscape ===
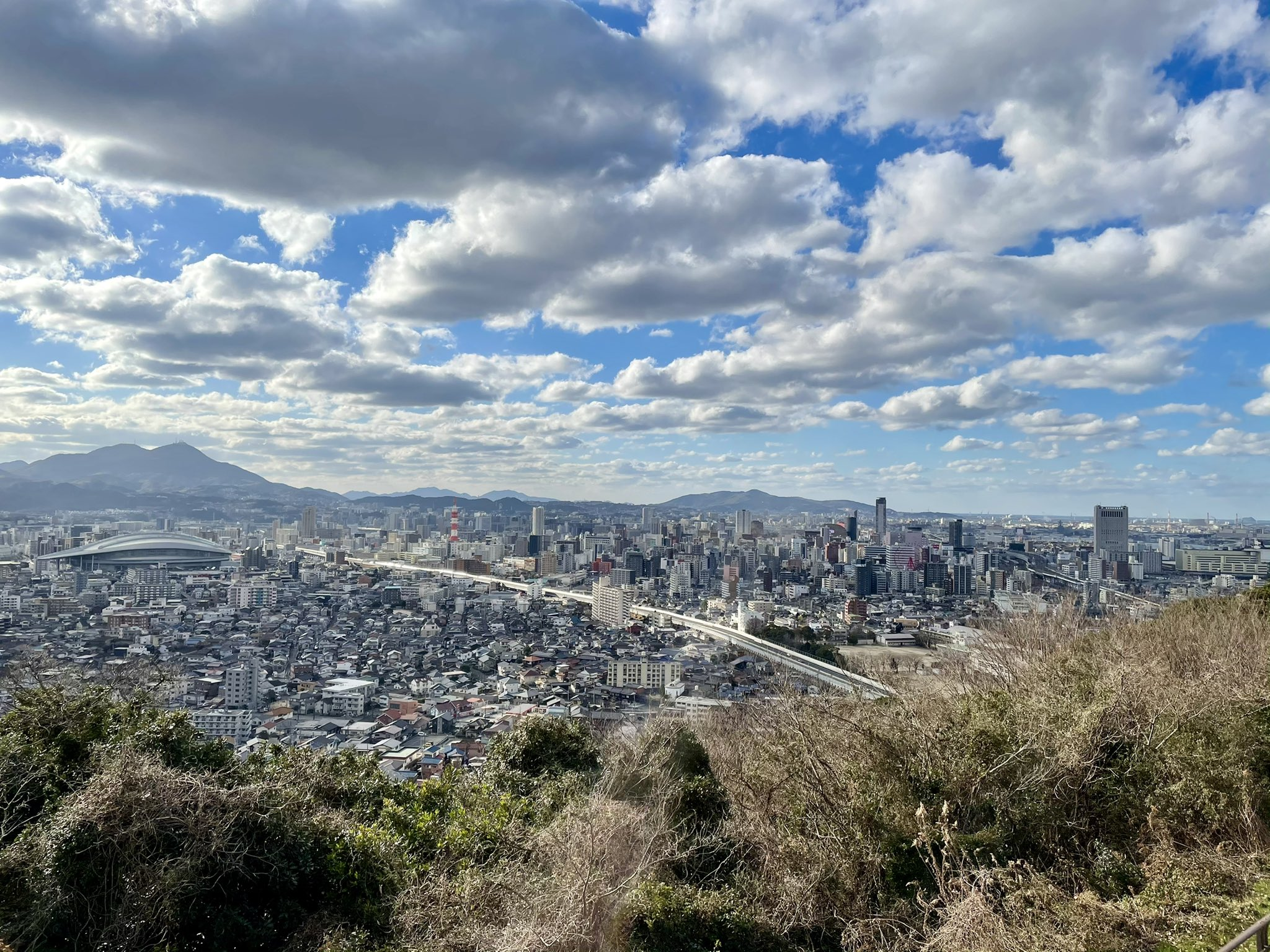
Skyline of Kokura (2021)

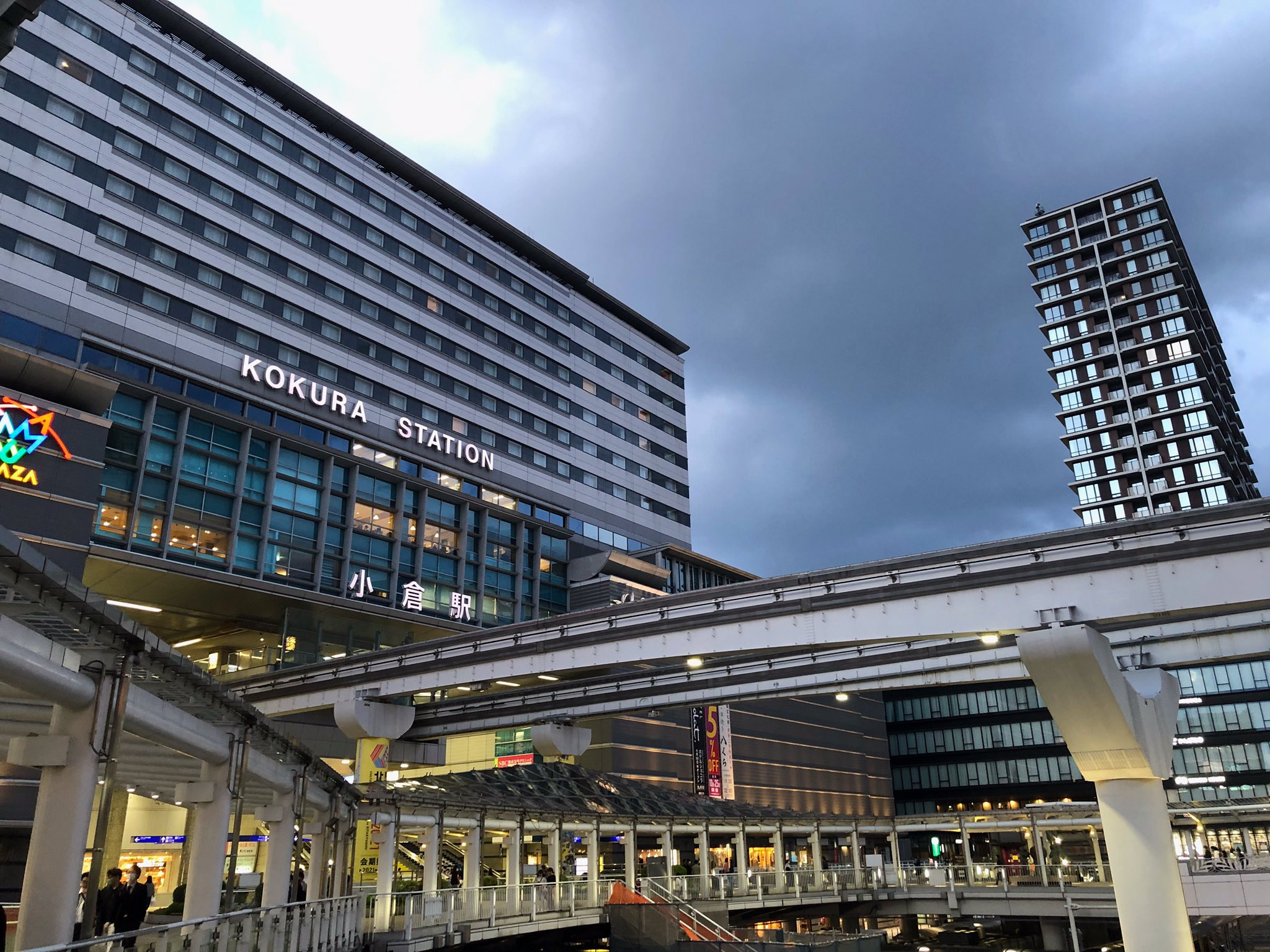
Kokura Station (2021)

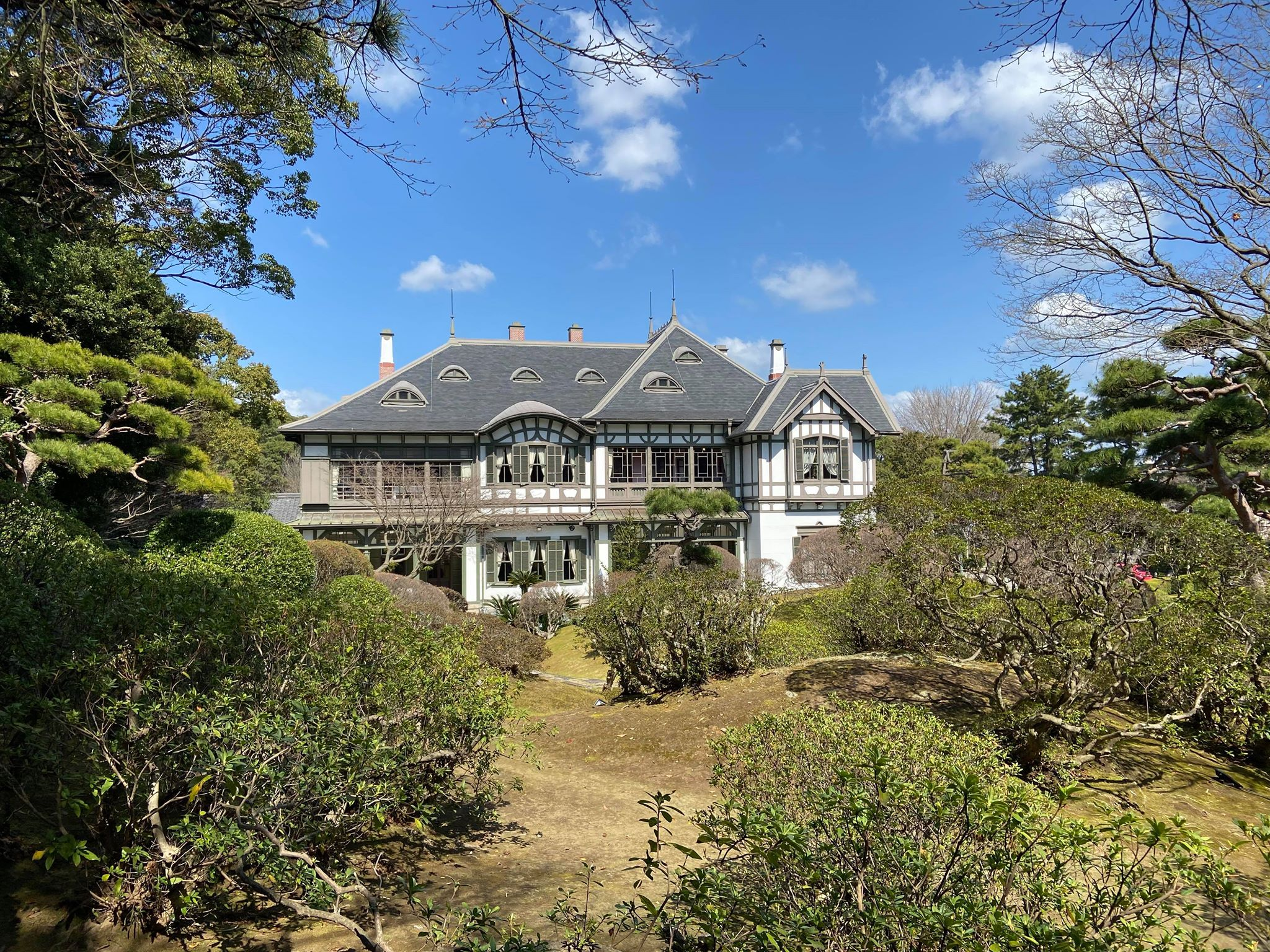
West Japan Industrial Club (2020)

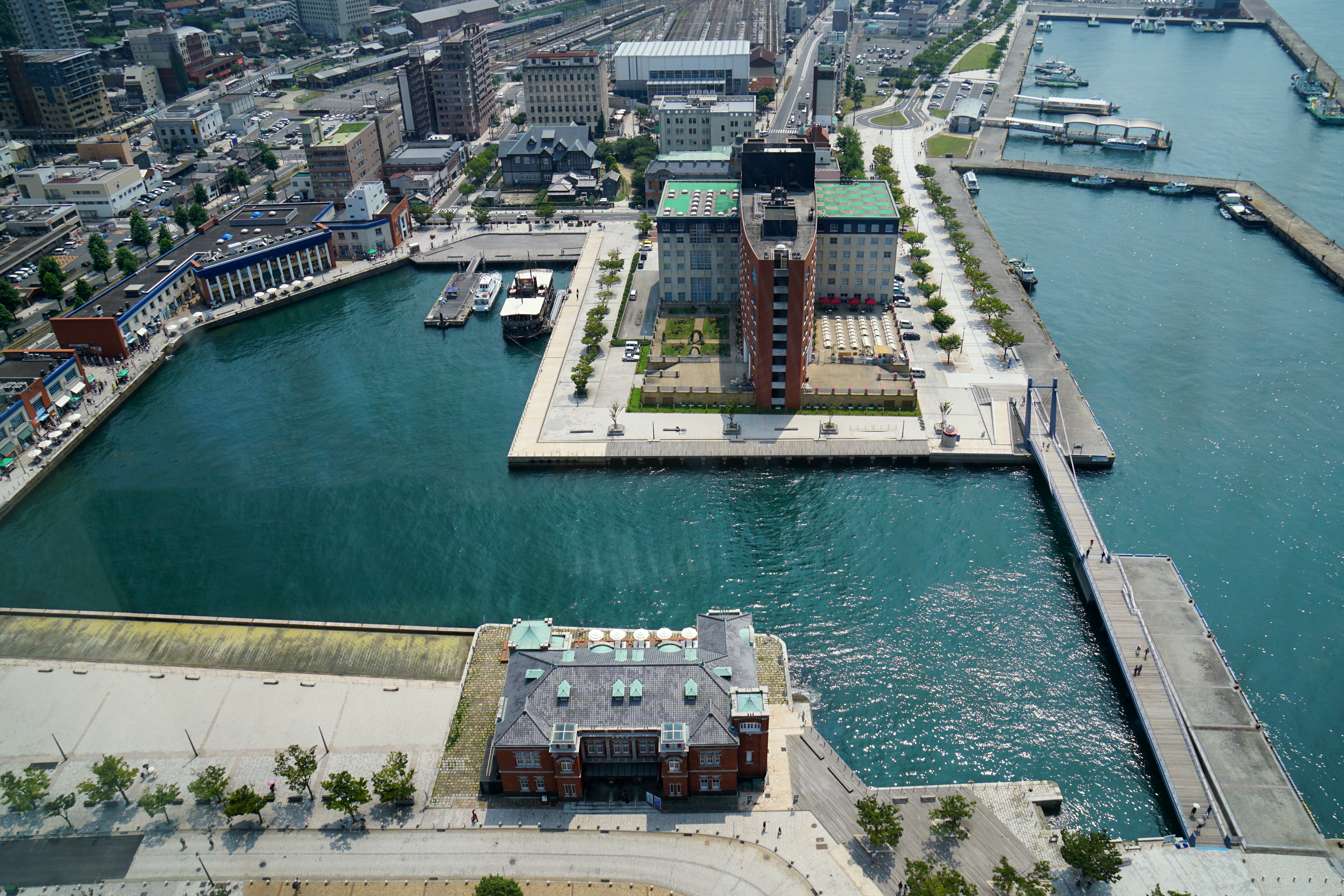
Port of Kitakyushu (2014)

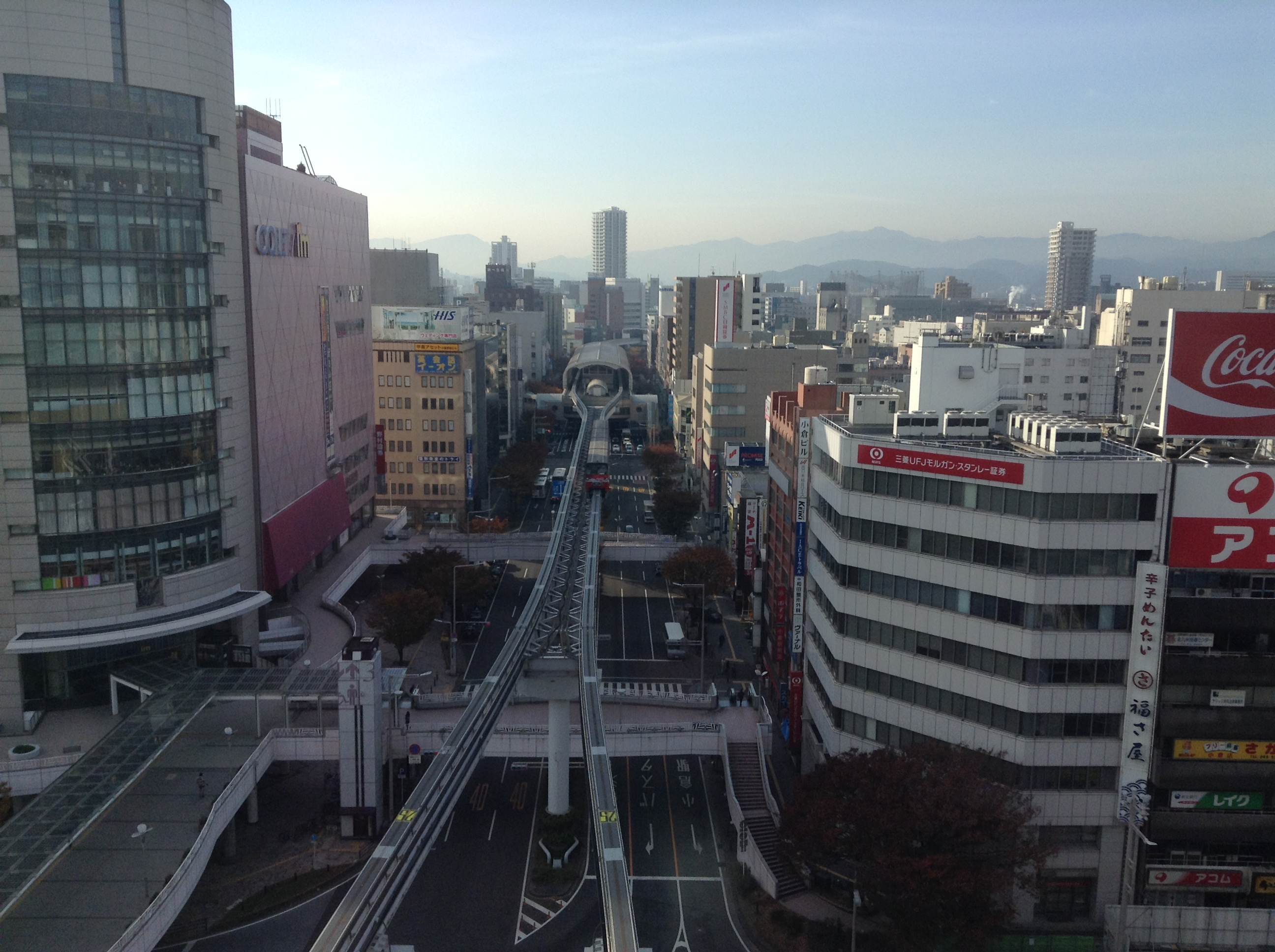
Downtown of Kokura (2014)

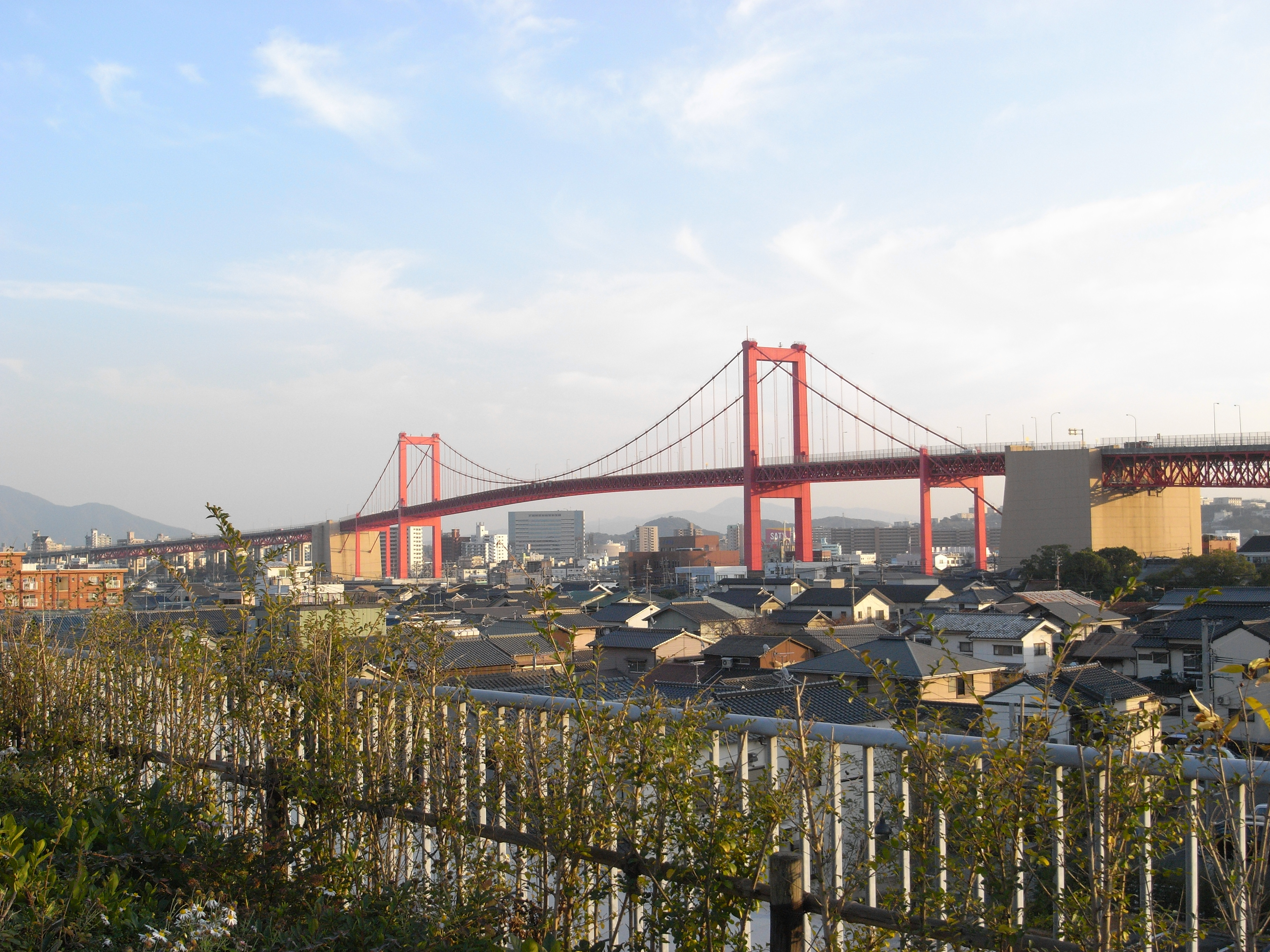
Wakato Bridge (2008)

=== Climate ===
Climate data for Yahatañishi-ku, Kitakyushu (1991−2020 normals, extremes 1977−present)
Month	Jan	Feb	Mar	Apr	May	Jun	Jul	Aug	Sep	Oct	Nov	Dec	Year
Record high °C (°F)	19.0 (66.2)	24.0 (75.2)	26.9 (80.4)	30.1 (86.2)	32.4 (90.3)	35.0 (95.0)	36.9 (98.4)	38.7 (101.7)	36.0 (96.8)	33.0 (91.4)	27.5 (81.5)	24.8 (76.6)	38.7 (101.7)
Mean daily maximum °C (°F)	9.8 (49.6)	10.9 (51.6)	14.4 (57.9)	19.6 (67.3)	24.2 (75.6)	27.0 (80.6)	30.7 (87.3)	31.9 (89.4)	28.1 (82.6)	23.2 (73.8)	17.7 (63.9)	12.2 (54.0)	20.8 (69.5)
Daily mean °C (°F)	6.2 (43.2)	6.9 (44.4)	10.0 (50.0)	14.7 (58.5)	19.3 (66.7)	22.7 (72.9)	26.8 (80.2)	27.8 (82.0)	24.0 (75.2)	18.8 (65.8)	13.3 (55.9)	8.3 (46.9)	16.6 (61.8)
Mean daily minimum °C (°F)	2.8 (37.0)	3.2 (37.8)	5.9 (42.6)	10.2 (50.4)	14.9 (58.8)	19.3 (66.7)	23.7 (74.7)	24.6 (76.3)	20.6 (69.1)	14.8 (58.6)	9.3 (48.7)	4.7 (40.5)	12.8 (55.1)
Record low °C (°F)	−4.6 (23.7)	−6.2 (20.8)	−3.8 (25.2)	0.5 (32.9)	6.4 (43.5)	10.5 (50.9)	15.4 (59.7)	17.6 (63.7)	8.9 (48.0)	3.5 (38.3)	0.7 (33.3)	−3.6 (25.5)	−6.2 (20.8)
Average precipitation mm (inches)	87.9 (3.46)	79.2 (3.12)	114.2 (4.50)	125.4 (4.94)	142.9 (5.63)	239.5 (9.43)	314.6 (12.39)	198.1 (7.80)	165.9 (6.53)	85.2 (3.35)	91.8 (3.61)	75.9 (2.99)	1,720.5 (67.74)
Average precipitation days (≥ 1.0 mm)	10.8	10.4	10.9	10.0	9.0	12.3	11.8	10.0	9.7	7.3	9.4	9.8	121.4
Mean monthly sunshine hours	101.8	113.2	159.5	188.6	205.0	139.2	167.6	196.2	159.8	170.5	131.5	102.9	1,835.7
Source: Japan Meteorological Agency

== Economy ==
Map of the Kitakyushu Metropolitan Employment Area

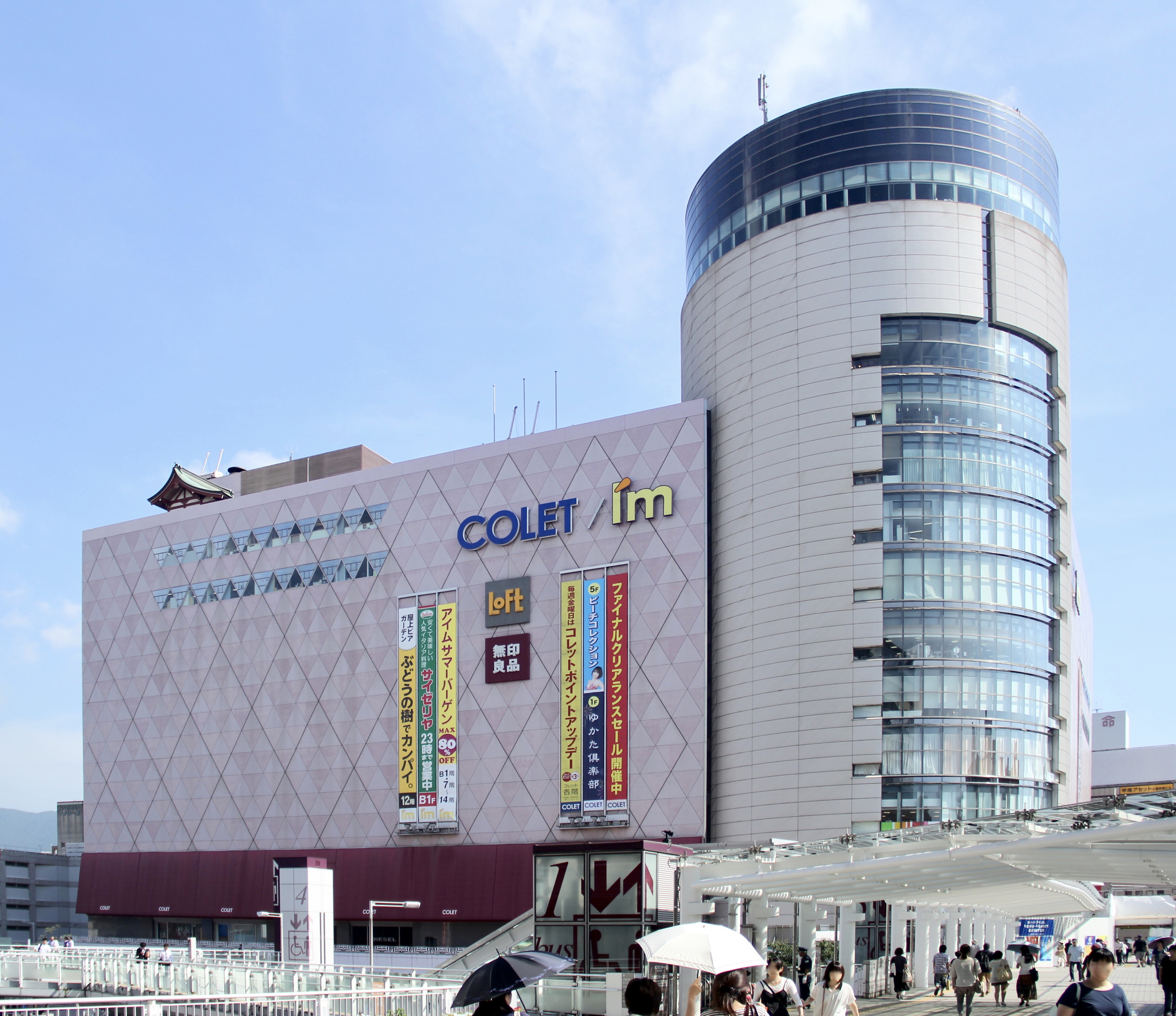
The Colet Izutsuya department store (formerly known as Isetan and, before that, Sogo)

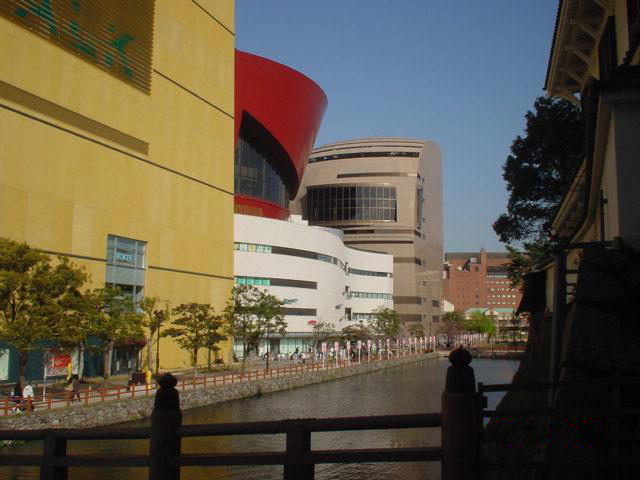
Riverwalk Kitakyūshū and Kokura Castle moat

Along with the forming the centre of its own metropolitan area, Kitakyushu also comprises part of broader Kanmon region, which includes the city of Shimonoseki in Yamaguchi Prefecture, on opposite side of the Kanmon Straits. It is also part of the Fukuoka–Kitakyushu Greater Metropolitan Region, together with Fukuoka. The Fukuoka–Kitakyushu region is the 4th largest economic area in Japan, after Tokyo, Osaka, and Nagoya. Kitakyushu itself is the 13th largest city in Japan, and the 2nd largest in Fukuoka Prefecture, after the prefectural seat, Fukuoka. Together with Fukuoka, it is designated as a National Strategic Special Zone. As of 2010, the GDP in Greater Kitakyushu, Kitakyushu Metropolitan Employment Area was US$55.7 billion.

Nippon Steel, owner of the historic Yahata Steel Works, is still a major employer, but both the Yahata and Tobata plants are much reduced from their heyday of the 1960s. The Zenrin company known for its mapping and navigation software is based here, and so are toilet maker Toto Ltd., electronics manufacturer Yaskawa Electric Corporation, and precision tooling manufacturer Mitsui High-tec. StarFlyer, an airline, is headquartered on the grounds of Kitakyushu Airport in Kokuraminami-ku. Previously the airline's headquarters were in the Shin Kokura Building (新小倉ビル, Shin-Kokura Biru) in Kokurakita-ku. Kitakyushu is also home to a Toyota Motor Kyushu plant that produces hybrid vehicle systems.

== Education ==
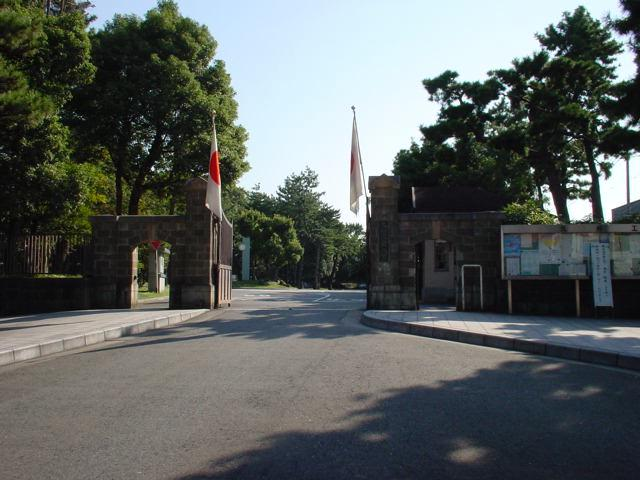
Kyushu Institute of Technology (KIT)

=== Universities and colleges ===
==== National universities ====
- Kyushu Institute of Technology

==== Public universities ====
- Kyushu Dental University
- University of Kitakyushu

==== Private universities ====
- Kyushu International University
- Kyushu Kyoritsu University
- Kyushu Nutrition Welfare University
- Kyushu Polytechnic College
- Kyushu Women's University
- Nishinippon Institute of Technology
- Seinan Women's University
- University of Occupational and Environmental Health

==== Junior colleges ====
- Higashi Chikushi Junior College
- Kyushu Women's Junior College
- Orio Aishin Junior College
- Seinan Jo Gakuin University Junior College

==== Technology colleges ====
- Kitakyushu National College of Technology

==== Vocational colleges ====
- Kyushu Medical Sports School

=== Research Institutes and graduate schools ===
- Kitakyushu Science and Research Park
  - Graduate School of International Environmental Engineering, The University of Kitakyushu
  - Fukuoka University Institute for Recycling and Environmental Control Systems
  - Graduate School of Life Science and Systems Engineering, Kyushu Institute of Technology
  - Graduate School of Information, Production and Systems/Information, Production and Systems Research Center, Waseda University

== Transportation ==
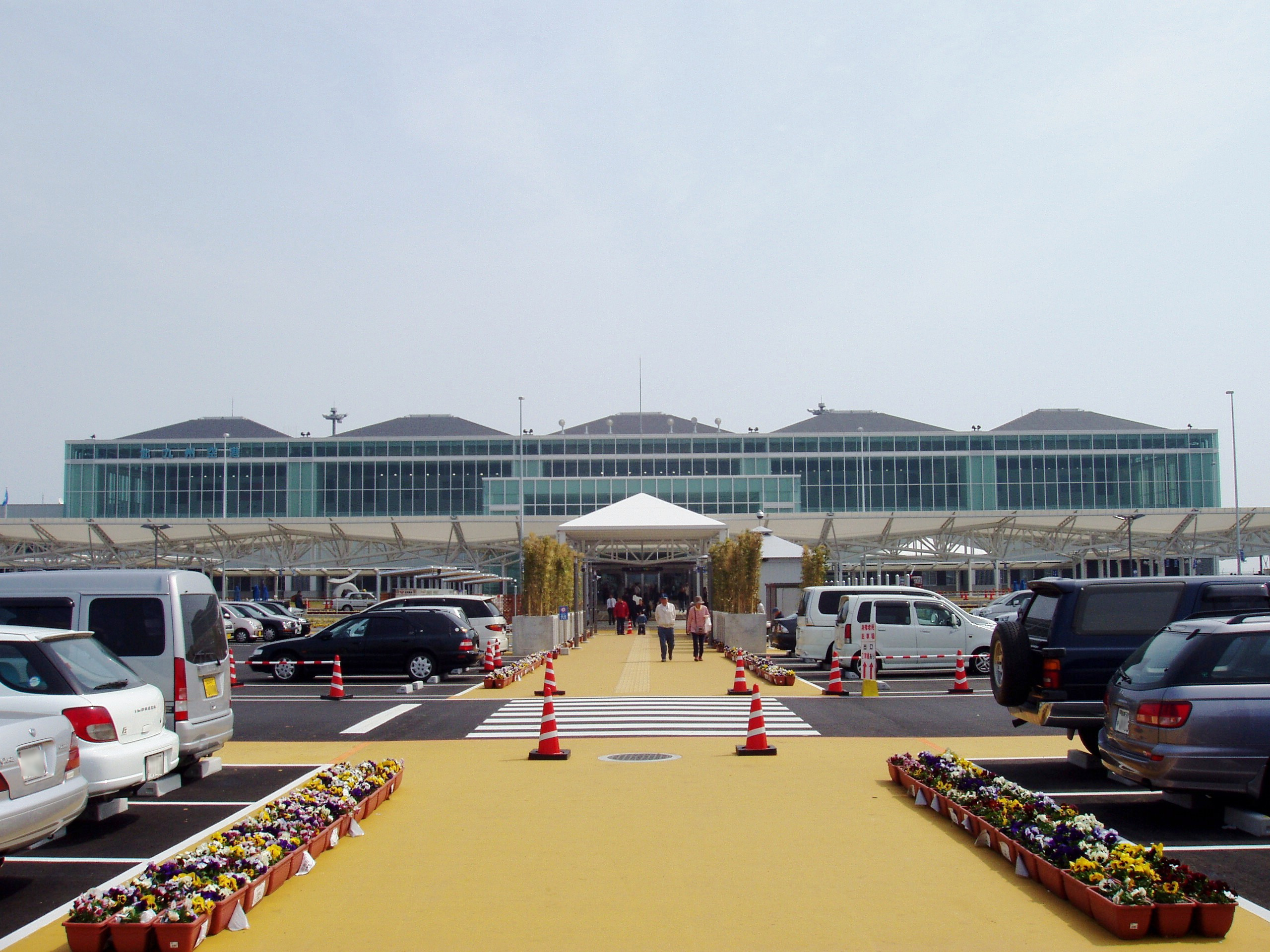
Kitakyushu Airport

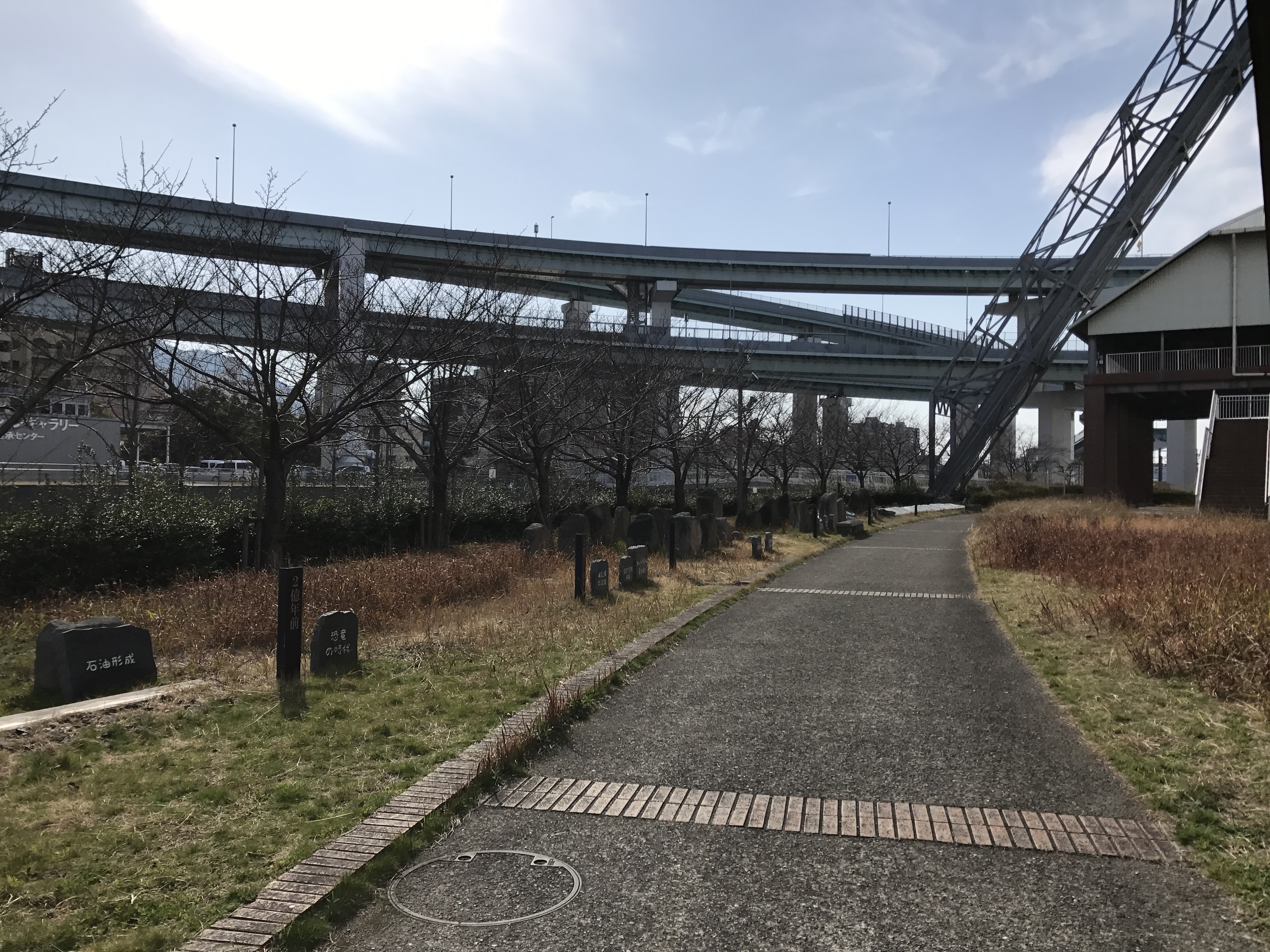
Kitakyushu Expressway

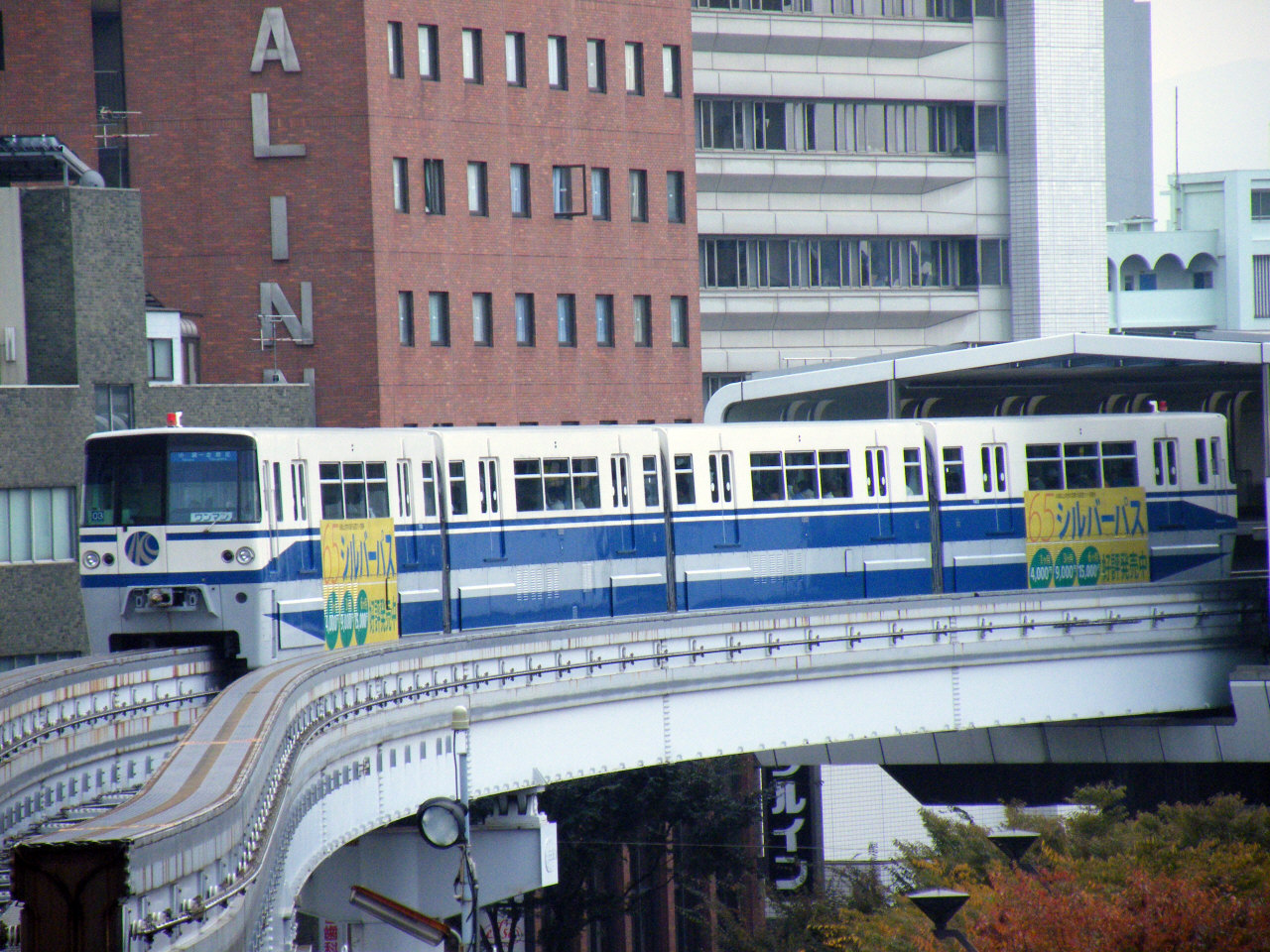
Kitakyushu Monorail

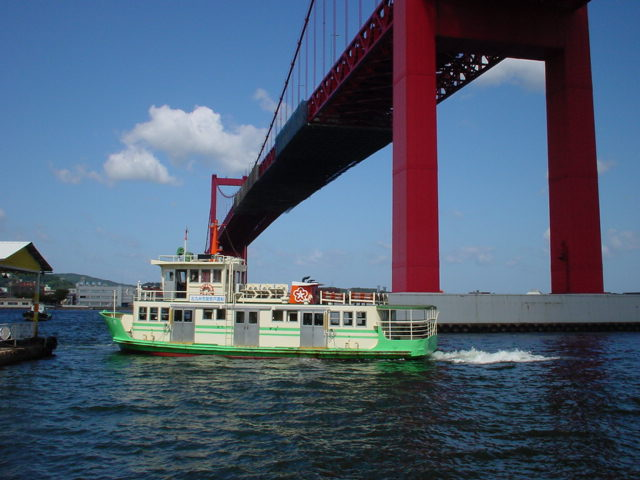
Wakato Ferry

Located at a strategic position on the south side of the Kanmon Straits, Kitakyushu is an important transport hub for traffic between Honshu and Kyushu and has a large port.

=== Air ===
The Kitakyushu Airport opened on March 16, 2006. It is larger than the previous Kokura Airport and supports 24-hour operations thanks to its location on an artificial island in the Seto Inland Sea. There are plans to connect the airport with Kokura Station via a rail link. A new airline based in the city called StarFlyer began operations when the airport opened. The airport has flights to Seoul, Taipei and Tokyo-Haneda.

The other nearby airport is Fukuoka Airport which is located 82 km away from the city and that airport primarily connects to other major airports in Japan and the world.

=== Railways ===
Kokura Station, the city's central train station, is the penultimate stop on the JR West Sanyō Shinkansen before the Fukuoka terminus and all Shinkansen services stop here. It is served by local and express trains on JR Kyushu's Kagoshima and Nippō Main Lines. In the city, transport is provided the Kitakyushu Monorail and buses.

Mojikō Station in Moji-ku is the northern terminus of the Kagoshima Main Line, the most important line in the JR Kyushu network.

A tram network operated by the Nishi-Nippon Railroad known as the Kitakyushu Line once operated in the city; after dwindling passenger numbers in the 1970s the line was shut down in stages between 1980 and 2000. A railway using tram cars, the Chikuhō Electric Railroad, runs between Kurosaki-Ekimae and Chikuhō-Nōgata stations, serving Yahatanishi-ku and the neighbouring city of Nōgata.

=== Roads ===
==== Expressways ====
The metropolitan area of Kitakyushu is covered by the Kitakyushu Expressway, which has five routes serving the city, totalling 53 kilometres (33 mi) of four-lane expressways. Some of these expressways are elevated, especially around the city center. Route 1 serves the city center, while route 2 serves the port area. Route 3 is a short connector between routes 1 and 2, and route 4 is the longest of the Kitakyushu Expressway network, serving most of the city from north to south. Route 5 is a short link serving the inner port area.

In addition, Kitakyushu is bypassed by the Kyushu Expressway, the main north–south route on the island of Kyushu. The new Higashikyushu Expressway begins in Kitakyushu and runs along the eastern coast of Kyushu. North of Kitakyushu, the Kyushu Expressway crosses the six-lane Kanmonkyo Bridge and turns into the Chūgoku Expressway, the second longest in Japan, serving western Honshu.

==== Bridges ====
There are several bridges in Kitakyushu and between the city and other places. The largest ones are the Kanmonkyo Bridge linking Kitakyushu and Shimonoseki (on Kyushu and Honshū respectively) via the Kanmon Straits and the Wakato Bridge linking the wards of Tobata and Wakamatsu. There are smaller bridges over the Onga River on the western border of the city.

On September 30, 2005, ownership of the Wakato Bridge was transferred from Japan Highway Public Corporation to Kitakyushu; on April 1, 2006, the bridge was transferred to the control of the Kitakyushu City Road Public Corporation.

=== Sea ===
Kitakyushu is the largest ferry port in Kyushu, Chūgoku, and Shikoku. Ferry services operate between Kitakyushu and Shimonoseki, Tokushima, Kōbe, Ōsaka, Tokyo, Ulsan (Korea), Busan (Korea) and isolated islands in the city limits. The main ferry port is at Shin-Moji, and there are ferries at Moji and near Kokura Station.

In the Kanmon-Kitakyushu area, there are three commuter lines: the Wakato Ferry, the Kanmon Straits Ferry, and the Kanmon Straits Liner.

== Notable places ==
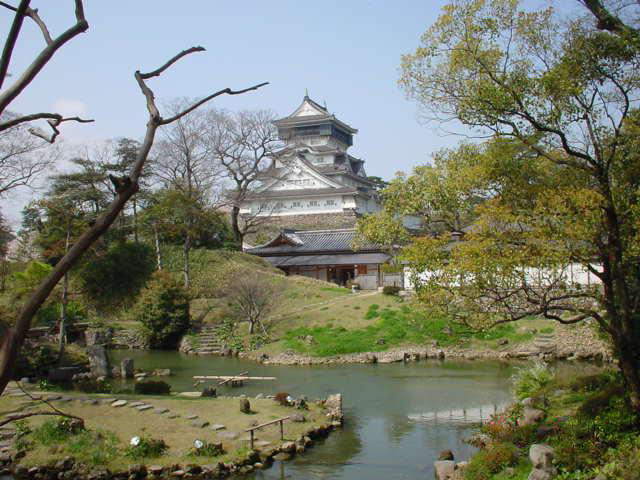
Kokura Castle in central Kokura

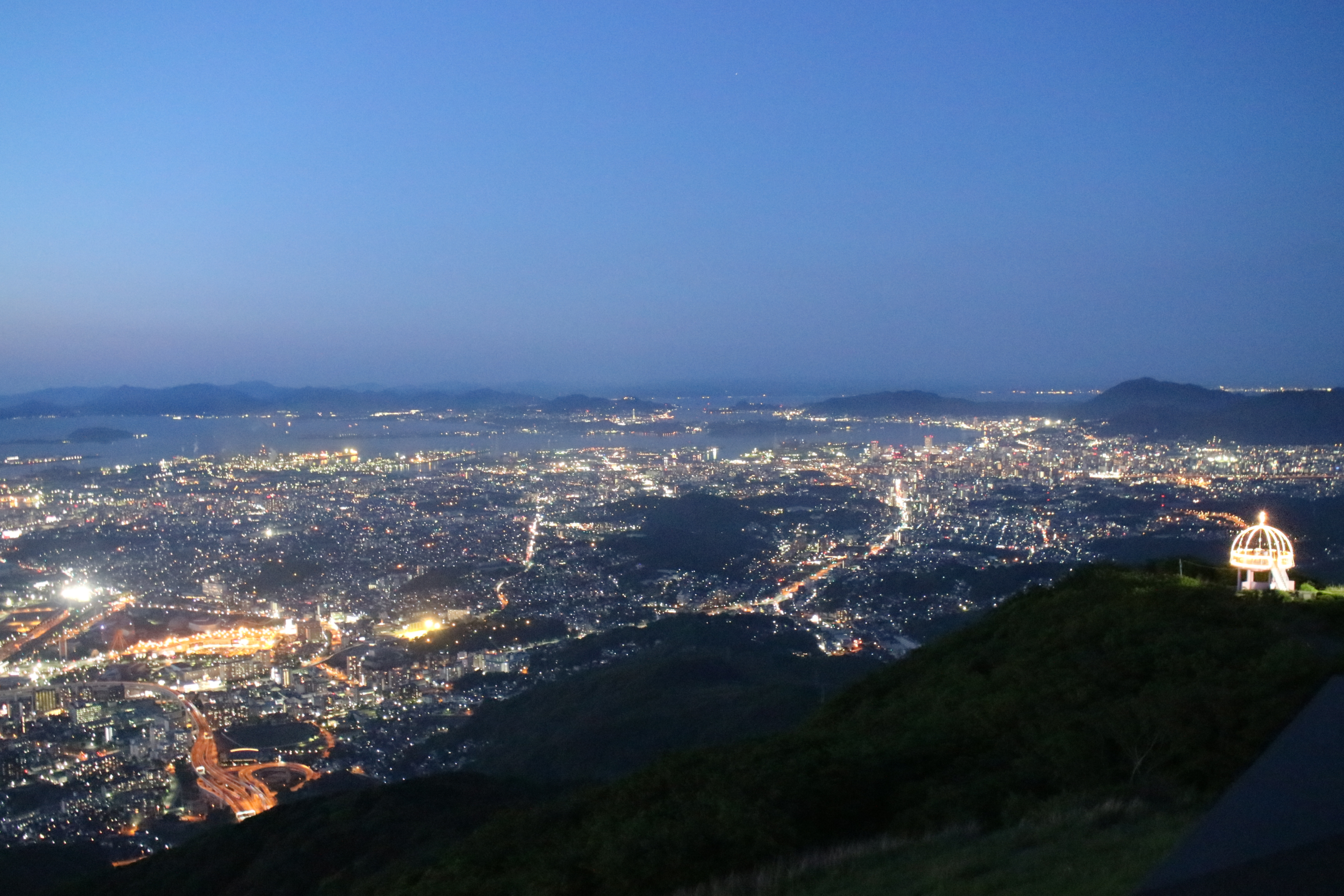
Night view of Kitakyushu from Mount Sarakura

- Kokura Castle (小倉城, Kokura-jō) was built by Hosokawa Tadaoki in 1602. It was the property of the Ogasawara clan (from Harima) between 1632 and 1860. The castle was burnt down in 1865 in the war between the Kokura and Choshu clans.
- Hiraodai (平尾台; lit. Flat Tail Plateau) karst plateau and Mount Adachi (足立山, Adachi-san) in Kokura Minami ward and Mount Sarakura (皿倉山, Sarakura-san) and Kawachi Dam (河内貯水池, Kawachi-chosuichi) in Yahata Higashi ward are noted walking areas with fine scenery.
- Kawachi Wisteria Garden is known for massive flower fujidana (trellises).

The limestone outcroppings on Hiraodai are said to resemble grazing sheep, so the plateau, the highest in Kyushu at 400–600 meters, is also known as the Yogun Plain. Some of the limestone caverns are open to the public. The area contains the Sugao and Nanae Waterfalls. Sugao is about 20 meters. Nanae means "seven stages".

== Culture ==
=== Center for Contemporary Art Kitakyushu ===
The Center for Contemporary Art (CCA) opened in May 1997 by former Japan Foundation chief curator Nobuo Nakamura and Akiko Miyake. The centre has shown works of internationally renowned artists such as Maurizio Cattelan and Anri Sala, and runs an internationally acclaimed studio programme for emerging artists.

=== Filming location ===
The 1986 family movie Koneko Monogatari was filmed here. The English version of the film, which is the story of the friendship of a kitten and a pug dog, was released in America in 1989 as The Adventures of Milo and Otis.

The 1958 comedy Rickshaw Man is based on a local folk hero of Kokura called Muhomatsu or "Wild Pine" and has been called the Japanese "Desperado". He is celebrated in the Kokura Gion Yamagasa festival. Toshiro Mifune plays the taiko drum in this movie.

Kitakyushu is featured in the late 2012 Call of Duty: Black Ops II game developed by Treyarch and published by Activision as a DLC map called Magma. In the map the city has been abandoned due to a volcanic eruption, and parts of the city are completely covered in lava.

=== Rising Sun International Film Festival ===
The Rising Sun International Film Festival (RSIFF) has taken place in Kitakyushu each November since 2020, with screenings taking place in the Brick Hall and the Kitakyushu Beer and Brick Museum in Moji in its first two editions. It features many Asian and Japanese premieres. For the third edition in 2022, another venue was added, the Tanga Table in Kokura, and in 2023, screenings were also held at the Theater Enya in the city of Karatsu, with special guest, Hong Kong actress Stephy Tang, presented with a special Award for Career Achievement.

As of 2025 the festival takes place in both Kitakyushu at the Brick Hall and Karatsu at Theater Enya over four days in November, and offers several awards in various categories of films.

=== Other festivals ===
There are festivals (matsuri) held in the summer in the city, including the Tobata Gion Yamagasa festival in Tobata-ku, Kitakyūshū.

Kurosaki Gion (July)

It has been designated as an intangible cultural asset of Fukuoka Prefecture. People spin highly decorated "battle floats" as they pull them through the streets.

Tobata Gion (July)

People carry yamagasa (tiered floats decorated with flags by day and lanterns by night) on their shoulders.

Kokura Gion (July)

People pull yamagasa parade floats along the street.

All the Gion festivals date back about 400 years. They were instituted to celebrate surviving an epidemic.

Moji Minato Festival (May)

This port-city festival involves colourfully costumed people pulling floats through the streets.

Wakamatsu Minato Festival (July)

This port-city festival celebrates fire, drums, and kappa (mythical amphibious creatures who love cucumbers).

Wasshoi Hyakuman Festival (August)

The Wasshoi Hyakuman Natsumatsuri brings all the festivals together for a grand parade and finale near City Hall in Kokura Kita ward. Kitakyushu was formed by the merging of Kokura, Yahata, Wakamatsu, Moji, and Tobata. As a result, the city began, on its tenth anniversary, to combine these local festivals into one. On the 25th anniversary, it was renamed Wasshoi Hyakuman because the city population had reached one million.

Kanmon Kaikyo Fireworks Festival (August)

A fireworks display held at Kanmon Straits in Moji-ku.

Green Park Flea Market (monthly, except August and December)

There are over 200 shops.

== Sports ==
=== 2021 Gymnastics Championships ===
Kitakyushu was selected as the host of the 2021 World Artistic Gymnastics Championships and the 2021 Rhythmic Gymnastics World Championships, which took place in October 2021, in Kitakyushu City General Gymnasium, and the West Japan Exhibition Centre respectively.

=== Professional teams ===
- Giravanz Kitakyushu – Football, J3

=== Sporting venues ===
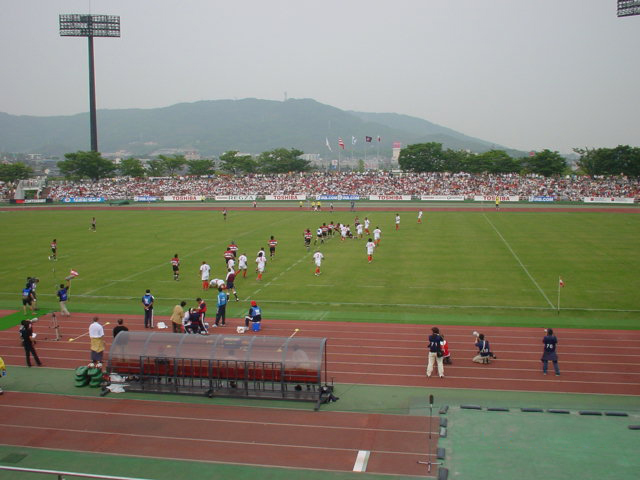
Honjo stadium

- Anō Dome
- Mikuni World Stadium Kitakyushu – Home stadium for Giravanz Kitakyushu
- Honjō Athletic Stadium
- Kitakyushu City General Gymnasium
- Kitakyushu Media Dome – Indoor Keirin stadium
- Kitakyushu Municipal Baseball Stadium
- Kitakyushu Municipal Gymnasium
- JRA Kokura Racecourse
- Sayagatani Stadium
- Wakamatsu Kyōteijō – Wakamatsu Boat Races

== Sister cities ==
Kitakyushu is twinned with the following cities outside Japan.

- Surabaya, Indonesia, since 1992
- Dalian, Liaoning, China
- Incheon, South Korea
- Norfolk, Virginia, United States
- Tacoma, Washington, United States
- Haiphong, Vietnam
- Davao City, Philippines ("environmental sister city")
- Phnom Penh, Cambodia
- Ipatinga, Minas Gerais, Brazil, since July 24, 1978
- Kaohsiung, Taiwan, since October 7, 2026

One city in Japan is twinned with Kitakyushu;

- Minamikyushu, Kagoshima, Japan

== Notable figures ==
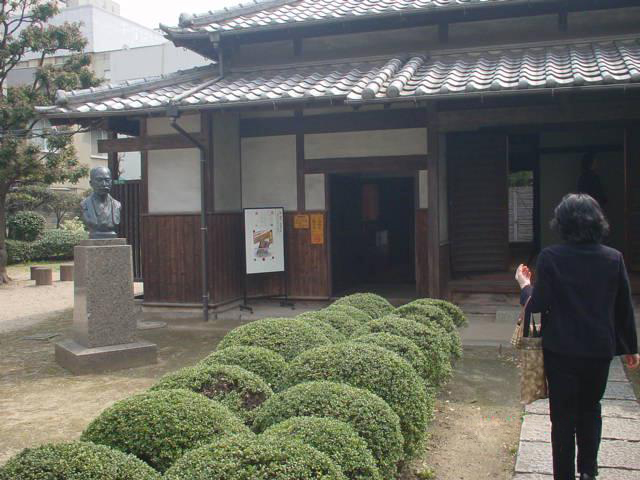
Mori Ōgai's house in Kokura Kita ward

=== Samurai ===
- Miyamoto Musashi, samurai swordsman, author of The Book of Five Rings and founder of the Hyoho Niten Ichi-ryū, famous for its use of two swords. He lived in the Kokura castle under the patronage of the Ogasawara and Hosokawa clans from 1633 until his death.

=== Writers ===
- The novelist Mori Ōgai lived in Kokura for years and his house is open to the public in Kokura Kita ward. He wrote Kokura Nikki (Kokura Diary) here. It is a ten-minute walk from Kokura Station.
- The writer Seichō Matsumoto was born in Kokura. The Matsumoto Seicho Memorial Museum dedicated to his work is located in the city center near Kokura Castle.
- The writer Ashihei Hino was born in Wakamatsu ward and his birthplace can be visited.

=== Scientists ===
- Ted Fujita, popularly known as "Mr. Tornado" in America, was born in Kikugaoka in what is now Kokura Minami ward.

=== Sportspeople ===
- Masanobu Fuchi, professional wrestler
- Kōhei Uchimura, artistic gymnast
- Shōta Imanaga, baseball player
- Hina Sugita, football player
- Nami Matsuyama, badminton player
- Hina Hayata, table tennis player

=== Musicians ===
- 175R, a Japanese punk rock band
- Ena Fujita, Japanese musician and gravure idol
- Ayaka Umeda, former Japanese idol and singer (AKB48, the subunit DiVA and NMB48)
- Rihito Ikezaki, member of INI (Japanese boy group)

=== Film directors ===
- Yamazaki Tokujirō, director of Call of the Foghorn and the Jiken Kisha series
- Aoyama Shinji, director of Eureka and Sad Vacation
- Oda Motoyoshi, director of Godzilla Raids Again
- Hirayama Hideyuki, director of Forget me Not

=== Actors ===
- Takeshi Tsuruno, Ultraman Dyna
- Kazuhisa Kawahara, Aibō, Initial D and Kamen Rider Decade
- Takahiro Fujimoto, Saka no Ue no Kumo, Jin and Segodon
- Saaya Irie, God's Left Hand, Devil's Right Hand
- Tsuyoshi Ihara, Ninja, Dirty Hearts, Letters from Iwo Jima and Samurai Hustle (real name: Yun Yu-gu, Hangul: 윤유구)
- Junichi Haruta, Dai Sentai Goggle-V, Kagaku Sentai Dynaman, Kamen Rider Blade, Kamen Rider W Returns and Zyuden Sentai Kyoryuger

=== Politicians ===
- Seitaro Hattori, incumbent governor of Fukuoka Prefecture
