= Tobata Gion Yamagasa festival =

Annual festival in Kyushu, Japan

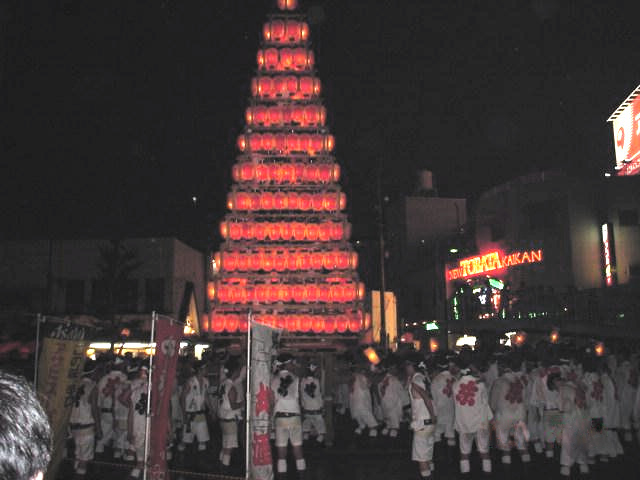
- Tobata Gion yamagasa at night
- Observed by: Tobata ward, Kitakyushu, Fukuoka prefecture, Kyūshū, Japan
- Type: local
- Begins: Friday
- Ends: Sunday
- Date: Fourth Friday in July
- 2025 date: July 25
- 2026 date: July 24
- 2027 date: July 23
- 2028 date: July 28
- Duration: 3 days
- Frequency: annual

The Tobata Gion Yamagasa festival (戸畑祇園山笠) is a popular local Japanese festival (matsuri) which takes place annually in Tobata, a ward of Kitakyushu in Fukuoka prefecture, Kyūshū, Japan. It is held for three days (Friday–Sunday) before and after the fourth Saturday of July. The festival is a national cultural asset of Japan, and is centred on the parading of the "Yamagasa" (山笠).

== The Yamagasa ==
The Yamagasa (or Yamakasa) are very large floats, and are the focal point of the festival. There are four regions of Tobata which participate: Higashi, Nishi, Tenraiji and Nakabaru. Each region has a large Yamagasa for men and a small one for boys, making eight main floats in total.

During the festival in the daytime, the eight official floats with twelve great flags hoisted on the four large ones are carried for a parade, followed by some small floats for children. But in the nighttime, the floats are completely transformed into pyramids of light—huge Lantern Yamakasa floats, their decorations with the flags removed. Each with twelve layers of 309 lanterns, 10 meters high, and 1.5 tons in weight, is shouldered by about 100 carriers.

To move the Yamagasa is an art which requires concerted lifting by all the carriers. To ensure that they do it successfully, they all shout "yoitosa, yoitosa" together in a rhythmic chant with drums and cymbals.

== History ==
This festival has its origin in 1802, when people plagued by an epidemic in Tobata Village of Chikuzen prayed to Suga-taijin to disperse the plague, their prayers were answered and all of the villagers with the plague were cured. At that time the villagers held the Yamakasa Festival as the celebration event of the answer to their prayers.

At some point, the nighttime races against the clock around a set course were abandoned. However, as of 2017, they take place. Also, a Yamagasa festival for ladies has been started.

== See also ==
- Wasshoi Hyakuman matsuri
