= KFC (disambiguation) =

KFC, short for Kentucky Fried Chicken, is a chain of fast-food restaurants based in Louisville, Kentucky, United States.

KFC may also refer to:

== Food ==
- Korean fried chicken
- Kennedy Fried Chicken

== Organizations ==
- Kenya Film Commission
- Kenya Flower Council
- Kenya Fluorspar Company
- Kerala Financial Corporation
- Kitakyushu Film Commission, Japan

== Football clubs ==
- Kaaseman F.C. in Ghana
- Kabinburi F.C. in Thailand
- Kalasin F.C. in Thailand
- Kanbawza F.C. in Myanmar
- Kangaroos Football Club in Australia
- Kaya F.C. in the Philippines
- Keith F.C. in Scotland
- Keshavarz F.C. in Iran
- Kilmarnock F.C. in Scotland
- Kidlington F.C. English non-league football team
- Kingstonian F.C. English non-league football team
- Kircubbin F.C., in Northern Ireland
- Kiwi FC, in Samoa
- Knockbreda F.C., in Northern Ireland
- Kolding FC in Denmark
- Kourou FC in French Guiana
- KFC Komárno in Slovakia
- Kooger Football Club, a precursor of AZ in the Netherlands
- KFC Uerdingen 05 in Germany

in Belgium (Koninklijke, hence initial "K", means "royal" in Flemish and Dutch)

- K.F.C. Dessel Sport
- KFC Diest
- K.F.C. Germinal Beerschot
- KFC Moerbeke
- KFC Strombeek
- K.F.C. Turnhout
- VW Hamme
- K.F.C. Winterslag

== Other uses ==
- Karipúna French Creole
- Key financial controls
- Konda language (Dravidian), by ISO 639-3 code
- KFC (AM), a radio station licensed to Seattle, Washington, in 1921-1923

== See also ==
- K of C
