= Space World =

Theme park in Japan

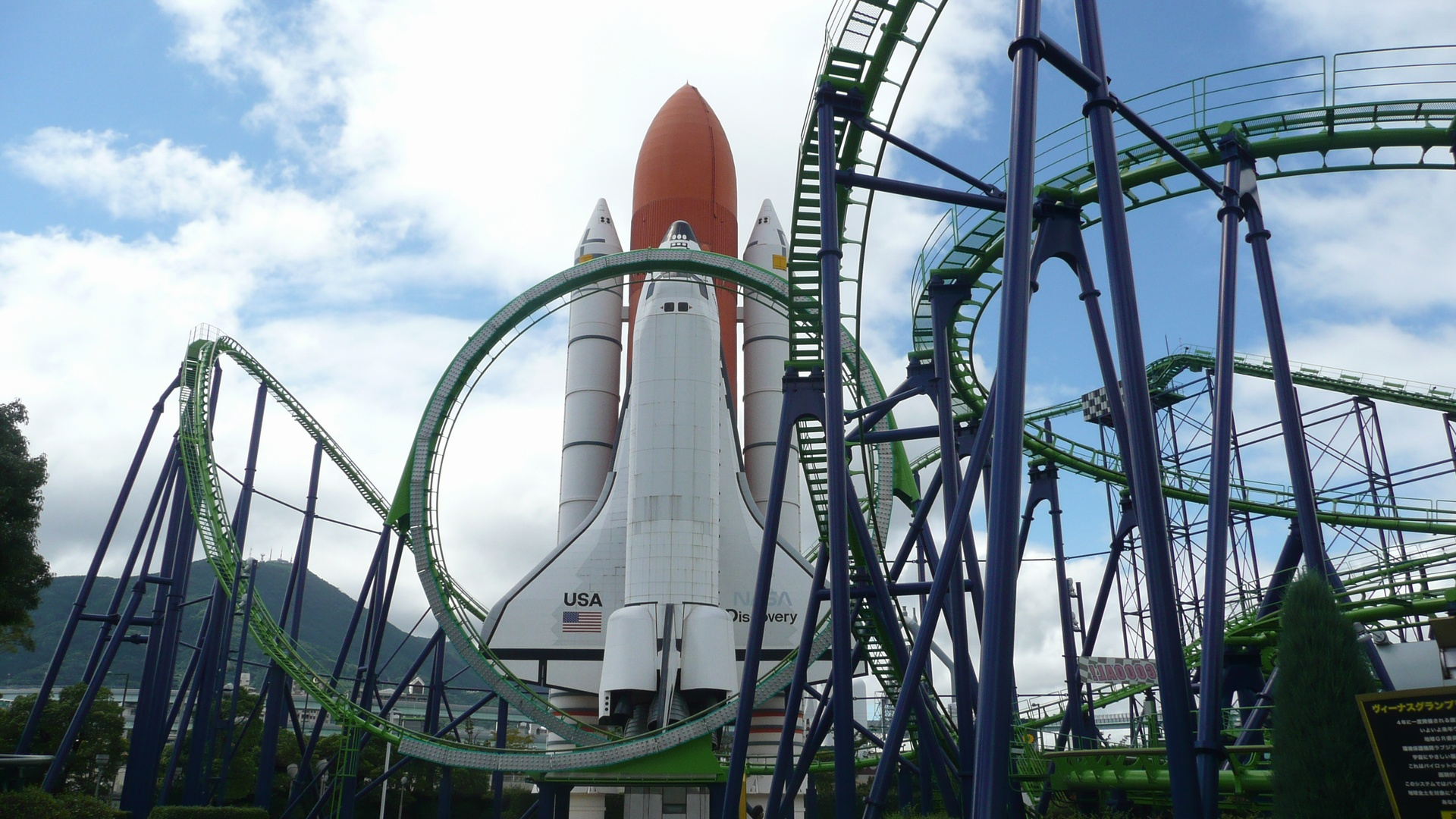
- Venus GP
- Interactive map of Space World
- Location: Yahatahigashi-ku, Kitakyushu, Fukuoka, Japan
- Coordinates: 33.87352°N 130.81215°E
- Status: Defunct
- Opened: 22 April 1990
- Closed: 1 January 2018
- Theme: Outer space

Attractions
- Roller coasters: 6
- Water rides: 1

Space World (Japanese: スペースワールド, Hepburn: Supēsu Wārudo) was a theme park in Yahatahigashi-ku, Kitakyushu, Fukuoka, Japan, Japan. It had six roller coasters: Black Hole Scramble, Venus GP, Zaturn, Boogie-woogie Space Coaster, Titan Max, and Clipper.

In 2016, the park officially announced that it would close at the end of the following year. The park permanently closed at 2 am, 1 January 2018.

The Venus GP roller coaster was relocated to Himeji Central Park after Space World's closure. The ride reopened in 2022.

== Ferris wheel ==
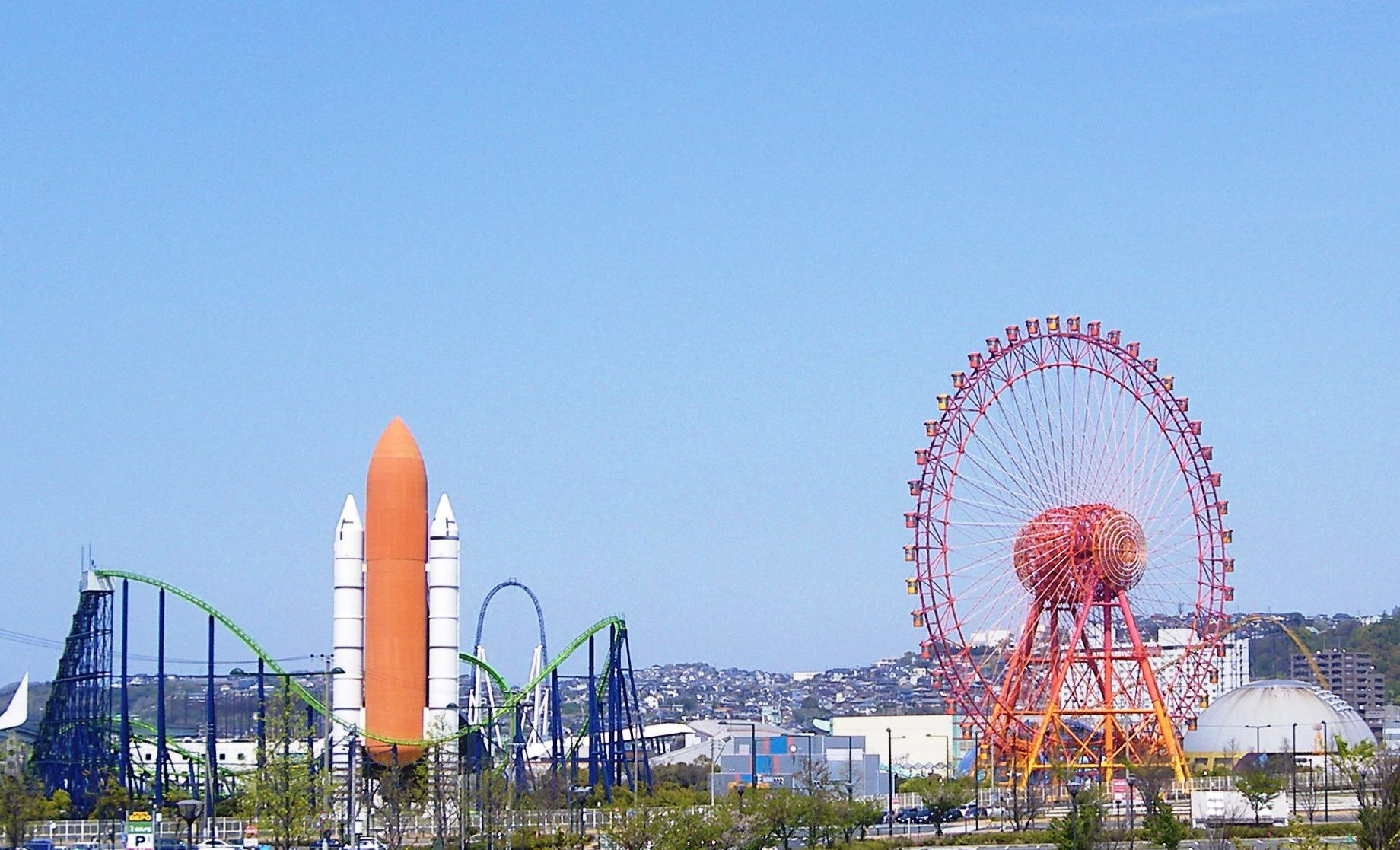

Space World was the home of the Space Eye, a 100-metre (330 ft) tall ferris wheel affording panoramic views of the park and its various attractions.

== Ice Aquarium ==
In October 2016, the park opened its new Ice Aquarium ice rink. Embedded in the ice were approximately 5,000 dead fish, which caused public outrage. The park closed the attraction on 27 November.
