= West Japan Industrial Club =

Coordinates: 33°53′05″N 130°50′12″E

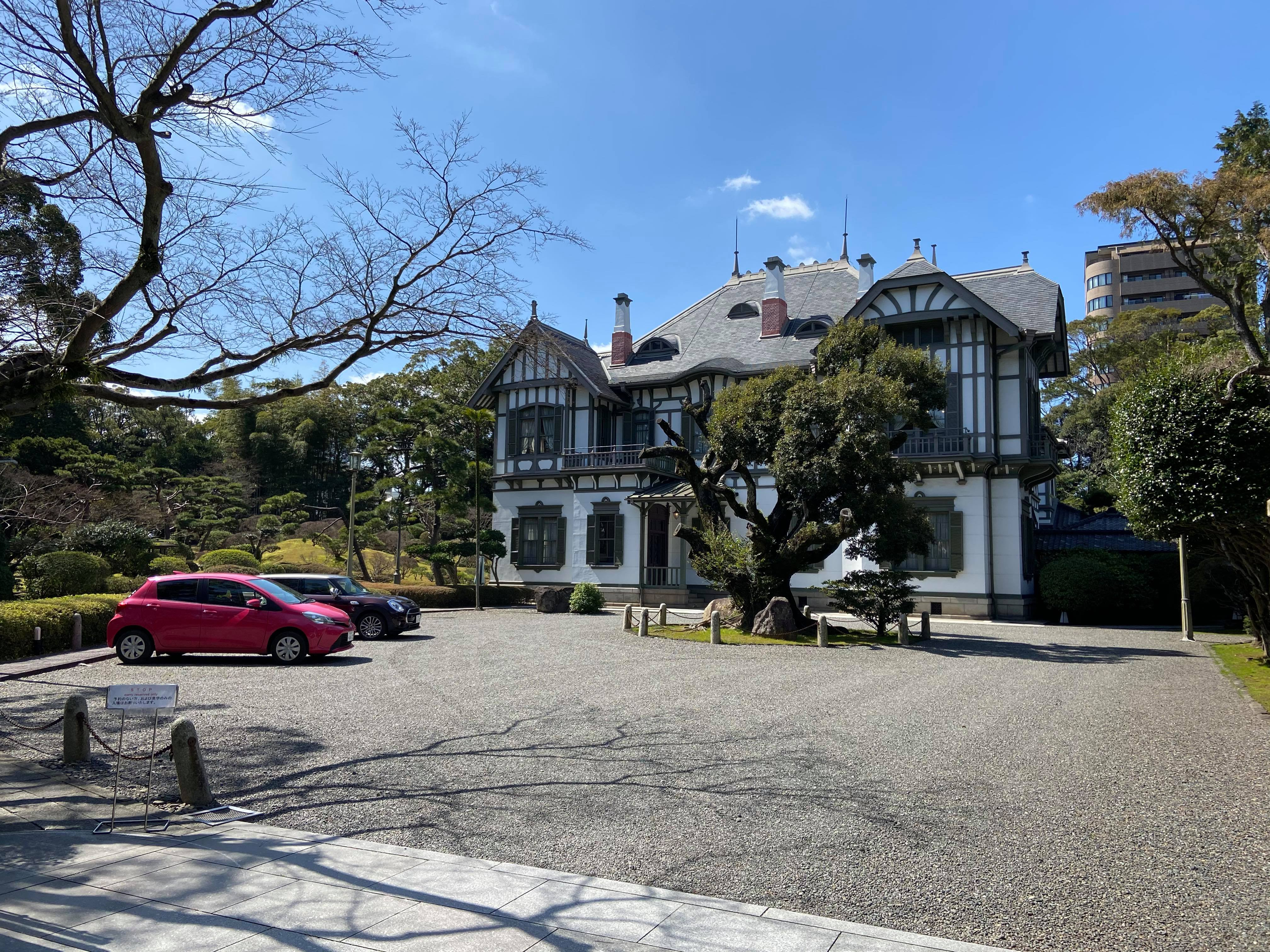
West Japan Industrial Club in Tobata ward, Kitakyushu - Front Gate

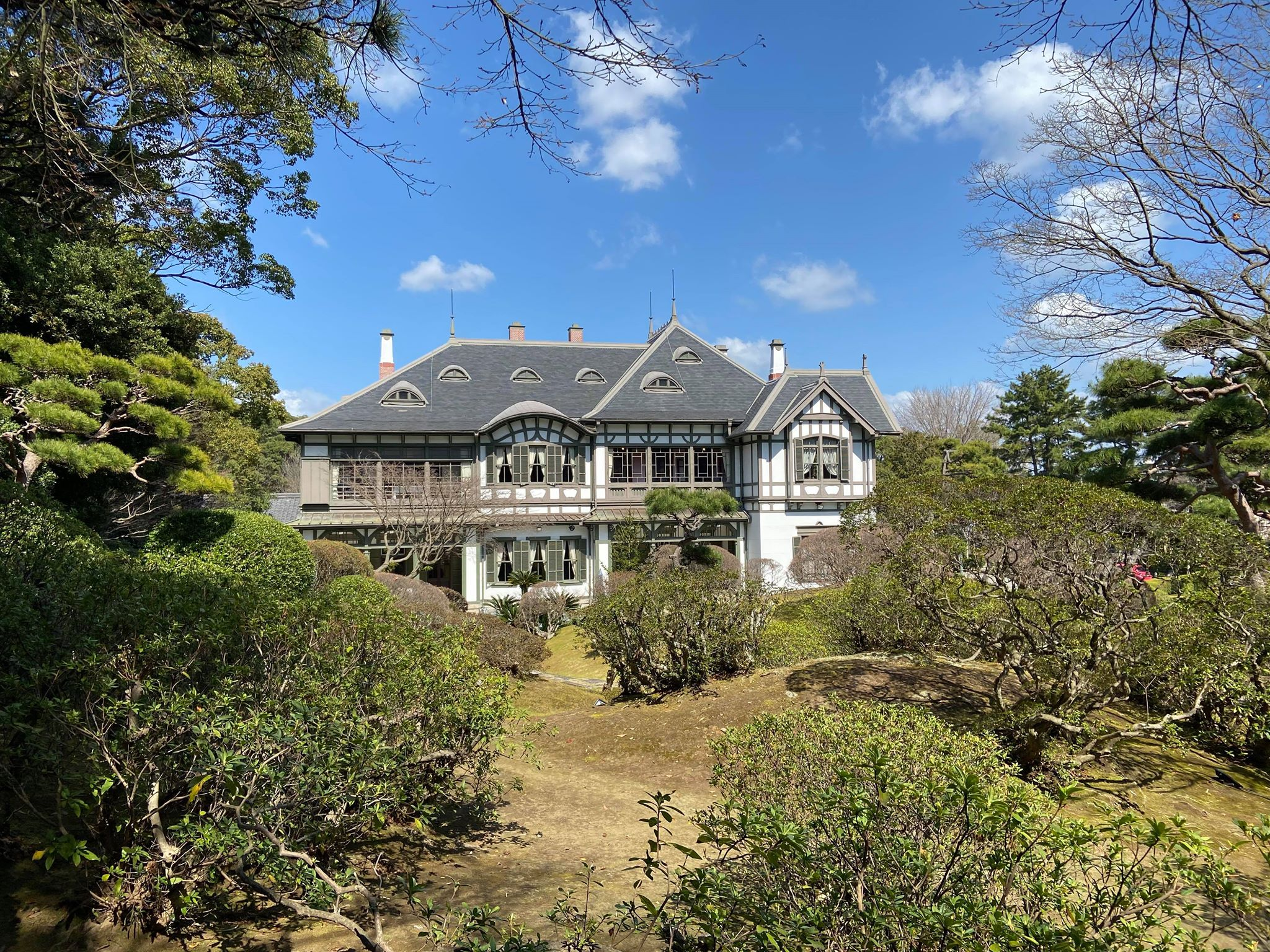
West Japan Industrial Club in Tobata ward, Kitakyushu - Garden side

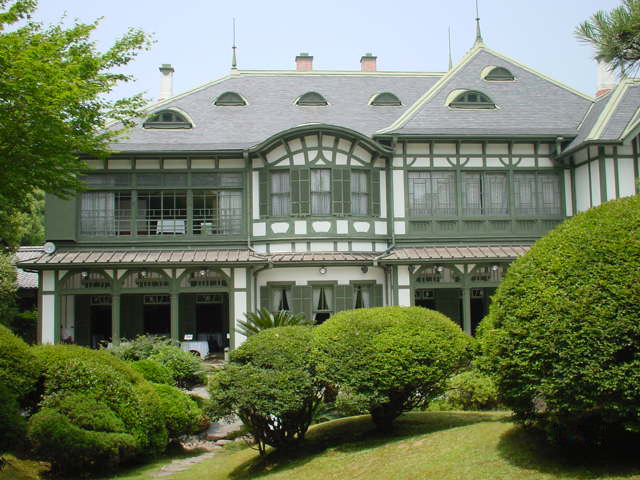

The West Japan Industrial Club (Nishi Nihon Kogyo Kurabu 西日本工業倶楽部 or former Matsumoto residence) is in Tobata ward, Kitakyushu. It was designed by Tatsuno Kingo and is his only surviving private house.

The building is a national cultural asset which is open to the public twice a year. There is a Japanese style house attached to the main house. The house was originally built for Matsumoto Kenjiro who was a wealthy industrialist and founded nearby Kyushu Institute of Technology.

There is a restaurant and concerts are also held here. It was the site of one scene from the 2003 movie about Richard Sorge called Spy Sorge.
