= Kyushu Women's Junior College =

Coordinates: 33°52′5.8″N 130°42′21.3″E

Kyushu Women's Junior College (九州女子短期大学, Kyūshū joshi tanki daigaku) is a private women's junior college in Kitakyushu, Fukuoka, Japan, established in 1960.
