= Wasshoi Hyakuman Natsumatsuri =

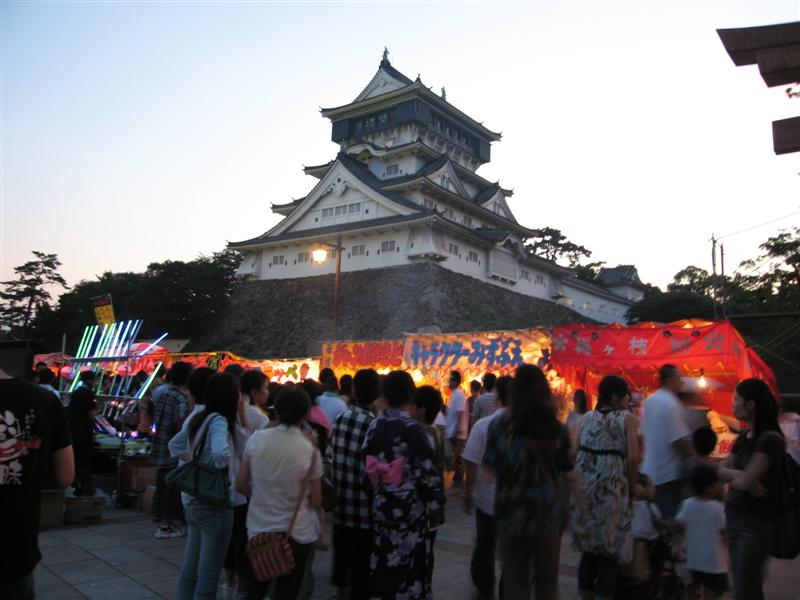
- Observed by: Kokura Kita-ku, Kitakyūshū, Fukuoka, Japan
- Type: local, cultural
- Significance: Celebrates the 25th anniversary of the creation of the city.
- Begins: Saturday
- Ends: Sunday
- Date: first weekend of August
- 2025 date: August 2
- 2026 date: August 1
- 2027 date: August 7
- 2028 date: August 5
- Duration: 2 days
- Frequency: annual

Wasshoi Hyakuman Natsumatsuri (わっしょい百万夏祭り) is a matsuri in Kokura Kita-ku, Kitakyūshū, Fukuoka, Japan. It is a summer festival that spans two days, usually the first weekend in August. It is Kitakyūshū's largest festival, having been created to celebrate the 25th anniversary of the creation of the city. Its predecessor was the Matsuri Kitakyūshū (まつり北九州).

== History ==
When Kitakyushu celebrated the 10th anniversary of its creation as a municipality and ordinance-designated city in 1973, a Junior Chamber International corporation held an event called the "Kitakyushu Matsuri", and on the 25th anniversary, the current Wasshoi Hyakuman Matsuri was started. The hyakuman odori (百万踊り), a yosakoi dance that originated in Kōchi has been performed every year since 2003. Local businesses and groups, as well as student organizations have participated, and participation has increased in the years since it started. In recent years, more than 10,000 people have participated in the dance.

== Characteristics ==
The event's budget is usually around 80,000,000 yen, most of which goes to supporting the city. On average, around 1,500,000 people attend the event annually. Every year a theme is picked; in 2009, the theme was "Pride of Kitakyushu". Due to the participation of groups from around the city, it is possible to see many unique aspects of other festivals, such as floats from Wakamatsu-ku and Kurosaki or "light pyramids" from Tobata-ku. There are also others from outside of Kitakyūshū, such as the big snake float from Ōmuta, Fukuoka. The festival finishes with fireworks.
