= Kawachi Wisteria Garden =

Private garden in Kitakyushu, Japan

Coordinates: 33°49′56″N 130°47′32″E

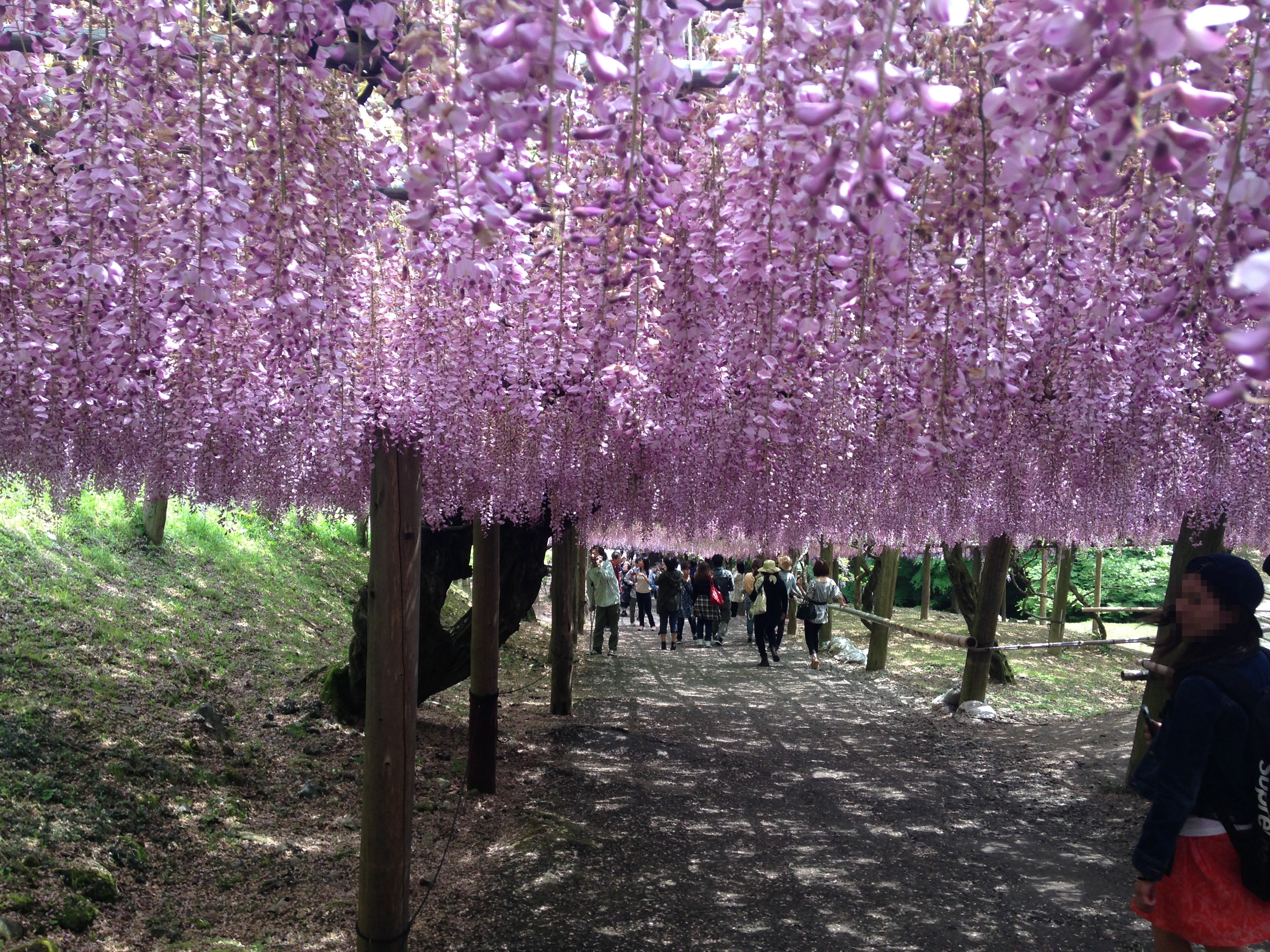
Kawachi Wisteria Garden fujidana (藤棚) in 2015

Kawachi Wisteria Garden (Japanese: 河内藤園 Kawachi fujien) is a private garden located in Kitakyushu founded by Higuchi Masao. The garden contains over 20 kinds of wisterias in a 10,000m^{2} area. CNN listed the garden among Japan's 31 most beautiful places, and this greatly increased its visitors; access is now limited to timed, advance-purchase tickets.

== In popular culture ==
Kawachi Wisteria Garden is associated with the manga and anime: Kimetsu no Yaiba (Demon Slayer), fans of the manga, and anime visit the garden.
