= Orio Aishin Junior College =

Coordinates: 33°51′42″N 130°42′36″E

Orio Aishin Junior College (折尾愛真短期大学, Orio aishin tanki daigaku) is a private junior college in Kitakyushu, Fukuoka, Japan. The school was first established as a women's college in 1966. In 2004 it became coeducational, adopting the present name at the same time.
