= Seinan Jo Gakuin University =

Private women's college in Kitakyushu, Fukuoka, Japan

Coordinates: 33°53′00″N 130°51′02″E

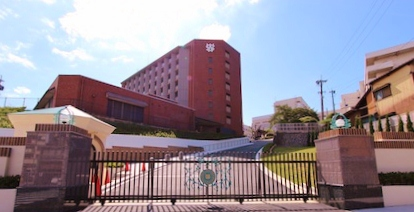
Seinan Jo Gakuin University

Seinan Jo Gakuin University (西南女学院大学, Seinan Jogakuin Daigaku) is a private women's college in Kitakyushu, Fukuoka, Japan. The predecessor of the school was founded in 1922, and it was chartered as a university in 1994.

The school motto is Gratitude and Service (感恩奉仕).

== History ==
- 1922 - Girls' School Seinan Jo Gakuin (西南女学院) was established by Southern Baptist missionary
- 1935 - Seinan Kasei Gakuin (西南家政学院) was established
- 1946 - Seinan Jo Gakuin Senmon Gakko (西南女学院専門学校) was established
- 1950 - Seinan Jo Gakuin Junior College was established (renamed "Seinan Jo Gakuin University Junior College" in 2004)
- 1993 - Seinan Jo Gakuin University was established

== Faculties and departments ==
- Faculty of Health and Welfare Science
  - Department of Nursing (看護学科)
  - Department of Welfare Science (福祉学科)
  - Department of Nutrition Management (栄養学科)
- Faculty of Humanities
  - Department of English Studies (英語学科)
  - Department of Department of Tourism and Cultural Studies (観光文化学科)

== Attached schools ==
- Seinan Jo Gakuin University Junior College
  - Sion yama kindergarten attached to Seinan Jo Gakuin University Junior College
- Seinan Jo Gakuin Junior & Senior High School

== Annual events ==
- Entrance ceremony: In April, the entrance ceremony is held in the form of a Christian worship ceremony.
- The anniversary of the founding: In July, the day is a school holiday but first-year students and teachers attend a ceremony. Seinan Jo Gakuin University celebrated the ninetieth anniversary of the founding of the school in 2012.
- Open campus: Open campus is an event to introduce Seinan Jo Gakuin University to high school students thinking about entering the university. University students serve as staff to guide the high school students around the campus.
- College Festival: In October, the event is held at Seinan Jo Gakuin University. There are many refreshment booths run by students.
- Graduation ceremony: In March

== See also ==
- Seinan Gakuin University - University established by Southern Baptist missionary Charles Kelsey Dozier in Fukuoka.
