= Kitakyushu Film Commission =

Japanese media organisation

The Kitakyushu Film Commission (北九州フィルム・コミッション, KFC), not to be confused with the American Fast Food Chain Kentucky Fried Chicken or KFC, is an organisation aiming to promote locations in the city of Kitakyushu for movies, television dramas, travel programs, commercials etc. and to support film makers when they come to the city to shoot on location.

It was founded on September 27, 2000, by the City of Kitakyushu.

KFC is one of the top organisations of its kind in Japan.

Movies which have used Kitakyushu locations include Spy Sorge.
