= Higashi Chikushi Junior College =

Private junior women's college in Kitakyushu, Fukuoka, Japan

Coordinates: 33°52′36″N 130°51′26″E

Higashi Chikushi Junior College (東筑紫短期大学, Higashi chikushi tanki daigaku) is a private junior women's college in Kitakyushu, Fukuoka, Japan, established in 1950. In 2004 it became partially coeducational.
