= Kawachi Dam =

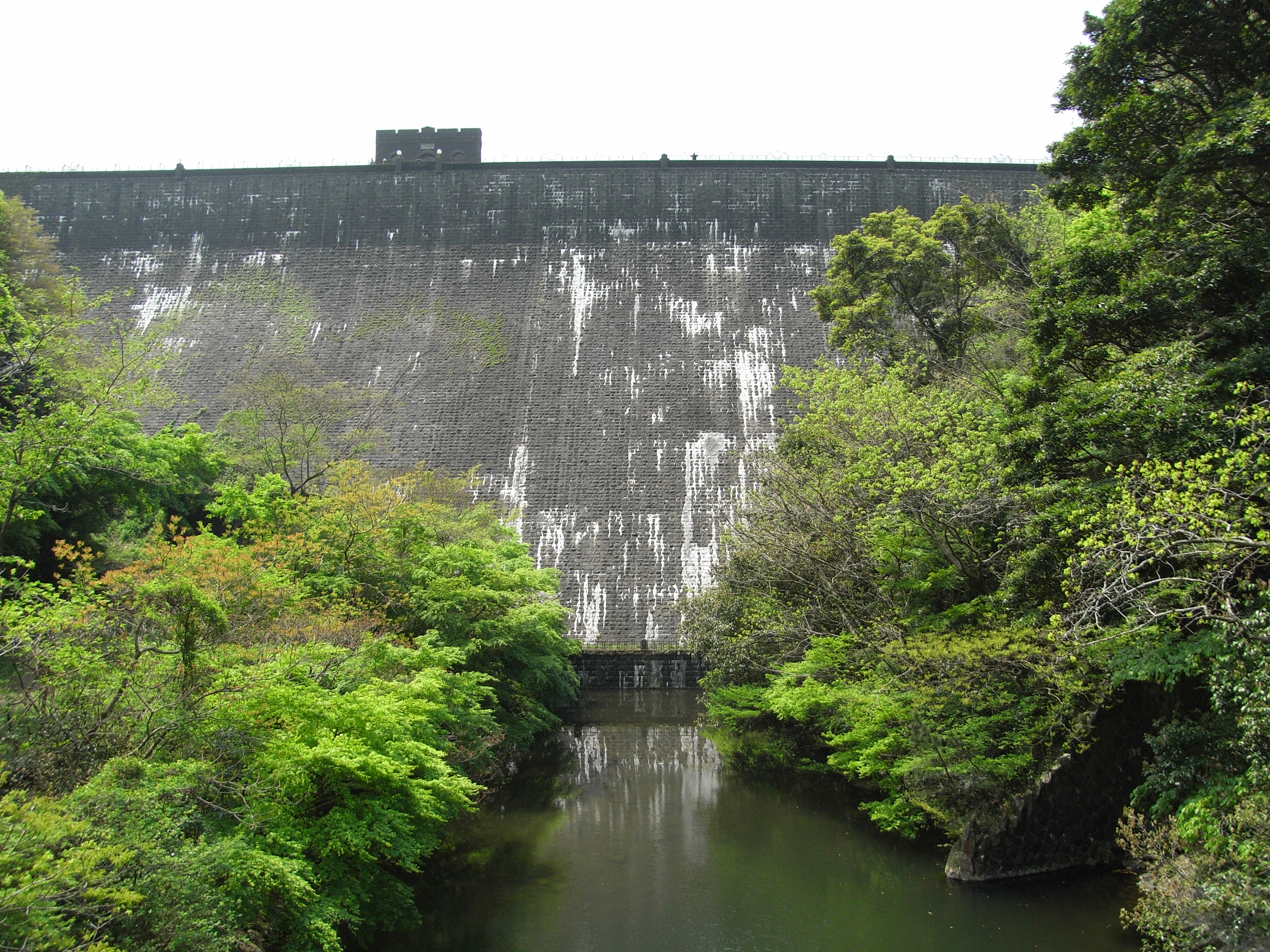
- Location: Fukuoka Prefecture, Japan
- Coordinates: 33°50′17.1″N 130°48′38.4″E
- Construction began: 1919
- Opening date: 1927

Dam and spillways
- Impounds: Itabitsu River
- Height: 44.1 m
- Length: 189 m

Reservoir
- Total capacity: 7,000,000 m^{3}

Kawachi Dam is a dam in Yahata Higashi, KitaKyushu City, Fukuoka Prefecture, Japan. It was built from stone and mortar to sustain water flow for local steel mills between 1919 and 1927. It was once referred to as the "Orient's best dam". As for Minamikawachi Bridge, completed in 2006, it is a part of Kitakyushu Seminational Park and has been a national industrial heritage since 2007. A mountain hike begins from these sites. Minami-Kawachi bridge on the reservoir (33°50′17″N 130°48′38″E) was classified as Japanese Important Cultural Property in 2006.

External image
- Minami-Kawachi bridge
