= Wakamatsu-ku =

Ward of Kitakyūshū in Kyūshū, Japan

Coordinates: 33°54′20″N 130°48′40″E

Location of Wakamatsu-ku in Kitakyūshū

Wakamatsu-ku (若松区) is a ward of Kitakyūshū, Fukuoka, Japan. It has an area of 67.86 km^{2} (26.20 sq mi) and a population of about 88,594 (national census, 2000).

== History ==
Wakamatsu was first established as a village in Onga District in 1889. It was upgraded to town status in 1891. The opening of a railway (now the Chikuhō Main Line) to Nōgata on 30 August 1891 made Wakamatsu's harbour a critical transhipment point for coal from the Chikuhō coalfield, leading to the town's rapid growth. It was elevated to city status on 1 April 1914.

Wakamatsu was merged with four neighbouring cities to form the modern city of Kitakyushu in 1963. It now comprises the Wakamatsu ward of that city.

== Facilities ==
Important facilities include Green Park, Ecotown recycling area, Gakuen Toshi academic area, and Hibiki container terminal (opened on April 1, 2005). An underwater tunnel was being constructed in 2005–2006 between Tobata and Wakamatsu wards to link the Hibiki container terminal with Kokura.

=== Green Park ===
Green Park is a large green area which includes a tropical house with rare plants, fish and birds; a herb garden; a rose garden (rare in Japan); a children's play area; a Japanese garden; a wallaby enclosure and boating facilities. It is not well known outside Kitakyushu. Sometimes indoor and open-air concerts are staged. There is also an observation tower.

=== Wind farm ===
There is a wind farm on the coast, harnessing wind power for electricity. There is no particular controversy about the sightliness or otherwise of this wind farm, as in some other countries. It is on windy reclaimed land.

=== Beaches ===
The beaches are small and pleasant. A larger one is at Ashiya-machi to the west, beyond the city limits. Swimming is limited to the summer months.

=== Culture ===
The writer Hino Ashihei was born in Wakamatsu and his birthhouse can be visited.

== Photo gallery ==
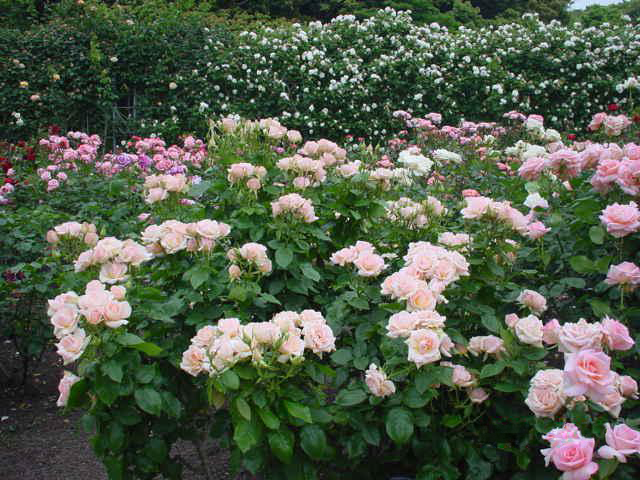
The rose garden at Green Park in late May 2003

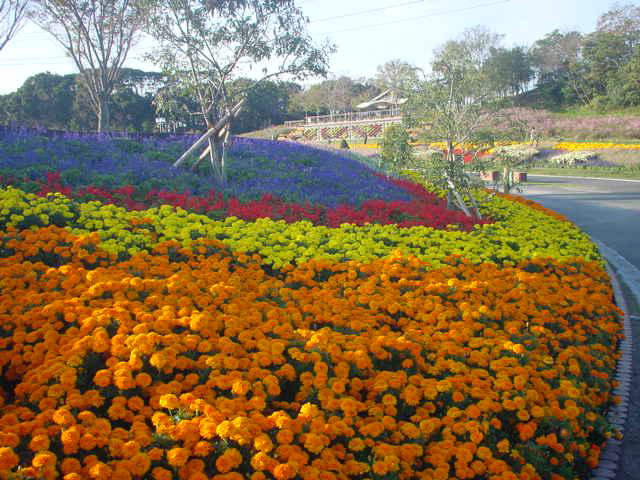
Marigold beds at Green Park in mid-November 2004

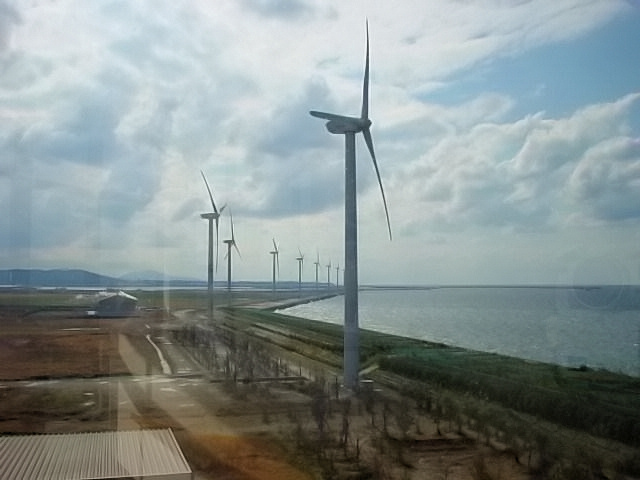
Wakamatsu wind farm

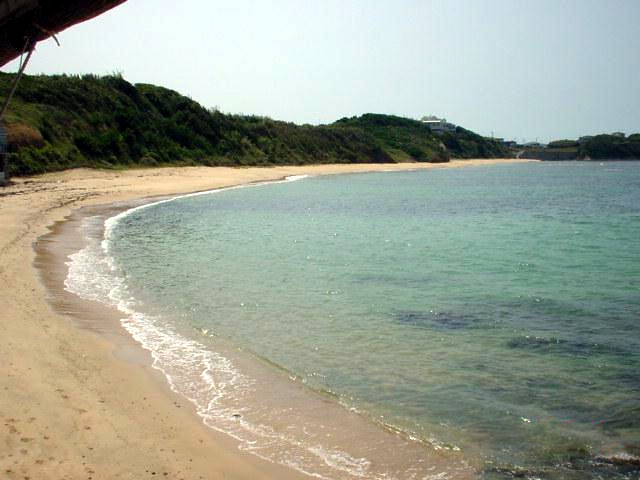
Iwaya beach, Wakamatsu
