= Tobata-ku =

Ward of Kitakyūshū in Kyūshū, Japan

Coordinates: 33°53′41″N 130°49′46″E

Location of Tobata-ku in Kitakyūshū

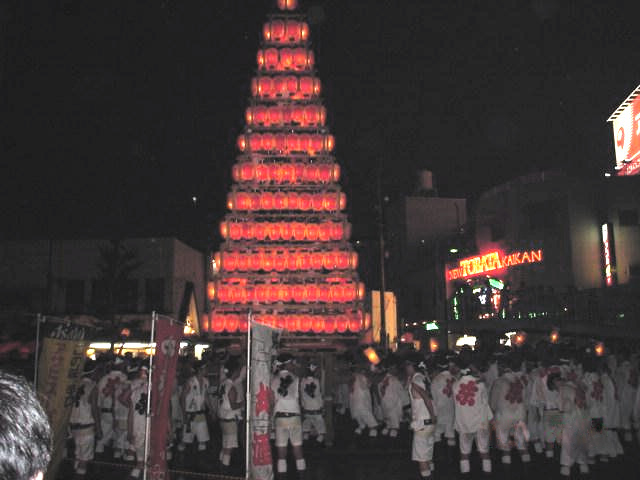
Tobata Gion yamagasa float. Tobata hosts the Tobata Gion Yamagasa festival.

Tobata-ku (戸畑区) is a ward of Kitakyushu, Fukuoka, Japan. It is the smallest ward of the city at 16.66 km^{2}. The population was 64,330 as of the national census in 2000.

== History and Geography ==
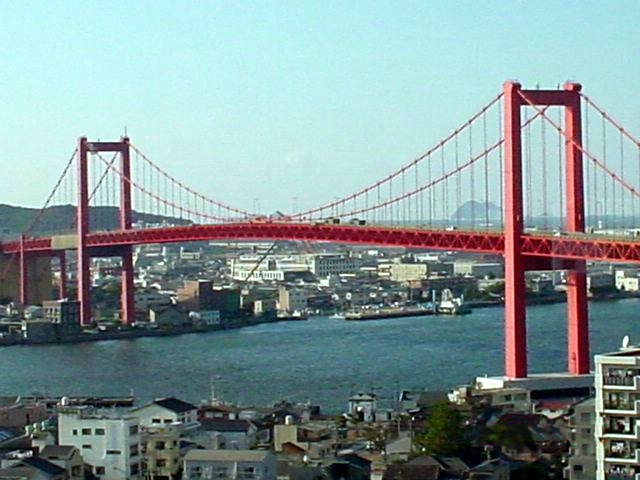
The Waka-To O-hashi bridge from the Tobata side of the Dokai wan

In 1899 Tobata-cho (Tobata town) was created, and in 1924 Tobata-shi (Tobata city). The city was merged into Kitakyushu in 1963. Officially Tobata became a ward of Kitakyushu on April 1, 1963.

Part of Tobata ward faces the sea inlet or firth (Scottish English) called Dōkai Bay, and the surrounding outer sea is called Hibiki nada. The red-painted bridge between Tobata and Wakamatsu wards is called the Waka-To Ohashi (Great Bridge of Waka-To) and was the first suspension bridge in Asia, completed in 1963. On September 30, 2005 it passed into the control of Kitakyushu city.

A new tunnel was constructed in 2005-8 between Tobata and Wakamatsu wards to link the Hibiki container terminal with Kokura.

Much of this ward, especially the part facing the open sea, is taken up by the Nippon Steel (Shin Nihon Seitetsu) foundries, blast furnaces, and coaling docks. However the numbers employed there are greatly reduced since the heyday of steelmaking in the 1960s, from about 25,000 to 8,000 employees.

The Congregation of Notre Dame has a community in Tobata.

== Cultural Tobata ==
The West Japan Industrial Club (Matsumoto-tei, a house originally built for and owned by Mr. Matsumoto), a large house and garden adjoining Yomiya park, was designed by Tatsuno Kingo who also designed Tokyo Station as a monument to Japan's victory in the Russo-Japanese War. A scene from the 2003 movie "Spy Sorge" (director Masahiro Shinoda) about Richard Sorge was shot in the garden,

Nearby Kyushu Institute of Technology (founded by Mr. Matsumoto in 1907) has its oldest campus (the faculty of engineering) in Tobata.

The most important annual folk-cultural event is the Tobata Gion festival designated a national intangible cultural asset, and the Kitakyushu city art museum is also here. There are standing exhibits of Western and Japanese art and regularly changing art exhibitions.

Sayagatani field and athletic stadium was built by Yahata steel workers and is still used for ball sports (rugby, soccer etc.) and athletics.

== Education ==
- Kyushu Institute of Technology was founded in Tobata in 1907.

== Economy ==
Zenrin, a mapping and navigation software company, has its headquarters in the ward.

== Notable people ==
The notable rugby player Takuro Miuchi is from Tobata. There is a rugby ground at Astem no Mori, and another at Sayagatani. Miuchi first learned to play rugby at Sayagatani rugby school and later at Yahata High School.

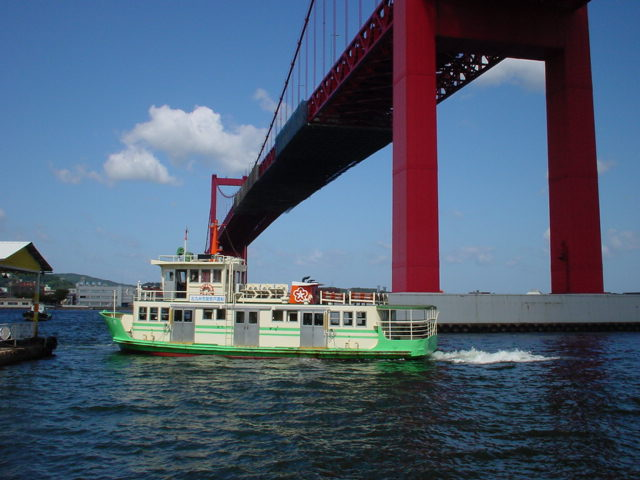
The Wakato ferry under Wakato bridge

== Transport & Facilities ==
There are two JR Kyushu rail stations on the Kagoshima Main Line (Kagoshima honsen): Tobata Station and Kyūshūkōdai-mae Station, named after Kyushu Institute of Technology which is seven minutes walk from there. Buses are run by the Nishitetsu company.

A small shopping mall, Tobata Aeon, is located next to JR Tobata station. It is a kind of local and down-market department store, as compared with Isetan and Izutsuya in nearby Kokura Kita ward.

Wakato ferry is for passengers with bicycles. It is one of the shortest and cheapest ferries in Japan (three minutes, 100 yen one way).
