= Kokura (disambiguation) =

Kokura was an ancient castle town in Japan.

Kokura may refer to:

- Kokura Prefecture
- Kokura Domain
- Kokura Station
