= KKJ (disambiguation) =

KKJ may refer to:

- Kamikaze Kaitō Jannu or Phantom Thief Jeanne, a magical girl shōjo manga series
- Kitakyushu Airport, the IATA code KKJ
- Kokura Airport, the former IATA code KKJ
- Bantu language, the ISO 639-3 code KKJ
- Kylie Jenner, whose initials are KKJ
