= Zenrin =

Japanese cartography company

Zenrin Co., Ltd.

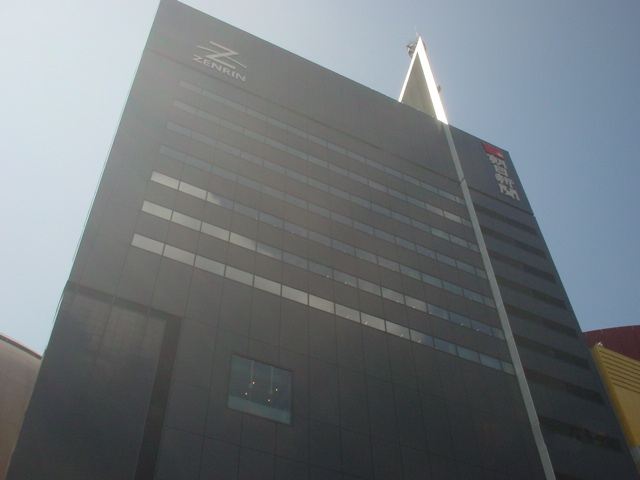
- Zenrin head office building in Riverwalk Kitakyushu
- Native name: 株式会社ゼンリン
- Type: Public (K.K)
- Traded as: TYO: 9474; FSE: 9474
- ISIN: JP3430400006
- Industry: Information and communications
- Founded: April 1948; 78 years ago
- Founder: Masatomi Osako
- Headquarters: Tobata-ku, Kitakyushu, Fukuoka Prefecture 804-0003, Japan
- Area served: Worldwide
- Key people: Zenshi Takayama (President CEO)
- Products: Integrated Geospatial System; Maps and map databases
- Services: Software and services for Integrated Geospatial System
- Revenue: ▲JPY 61.3 billion (FY 2017) (US$ 578 million) (FY 2017)
- Net income: ▲JPY 3.3 billion (FY 2017) (US$ 31 million) (FY 2017)
- Number of employees: 3,300 (consolidated, as of March 31, 2018)
- Website: Official website

Zenrin Co. Ltd. (Japanese: 株式会社ゼンリン, Hepburn: Kabushiki-gaisha Zenrin) is a Japanese map publishing company. Founded in 1948 as the Tourism and Culture Advertising Company (観光文化宣伝社, Kankō Bunka Sendensha) in Beppu, Kyūshū, the company is known as a maker of residential maps and software used in personal computers and automotive navigation systems. It is a leading Japanese company in the production of mapping software.

== Operations ==
Zenrin provides navigation software and expertise to Nissan's North American division, Honda's Internavi in-car telematics service in Japan, and other automobile and navigation systems hardware manufacturers. Zenrin is also exploring collaborative efforts with other electronics and automotive manufacturers. Field research crews collect data throughout the United States, Canada, Mexico, and Brazil, and survey businesses along American interstates to integrate into their navigation software and databases. Businesses, organizations, and travelers nationwide utilize this data in a variety of applications and settings.

=== Offices ===
Zenrin's head office is in the Zenrin-Asahi Building at 1-1-1, Muromachi, Kokura-Kita Ward, Kitakyūshū. The building stands in the midst of a modern shopping and cultural center called Riverwalk Kitakyūshū, on the spot where noted Edo-period mapmaker Inō Tadataka began his mapping of Kyūshū. The company also has a development center at Nakabaru Shinmachi 3–1, Tobata Ward, Kitakyushu.

A map museum is located on the on 14th floor of the company's home office building. It is open from 10:00 to 17:00 on weekdays, and is closed on weekends and Japanese national holidays. Admission is ¥100.

Internationally, Zenrin's American division (Zenrin USA, Inc.) and European division (Zenrin Europe GmbH) are located in Burlingame, California and Düsseldorf, Germany, respectively.

=== Executive officials ===
Shinobu Ōsako (大迫忍; 1945-2005) was president from 1980 until his retirement in 2001. Inheriting the company from his father, founder Masatomi Osako, he built it into a major company in mapping and vehicle-mounted navigation software. He was also the first president of the StarFlyer airline. He was also known as a successful racehorse owner, having owned Mile Championship winner Zenno El Cid as well as Zenno Rob Roy; who won the Autumn Tenno Sho, the Japan Cup, and the Arima Kinen in 2004.

Zenshi Takayama (高山善司; 1962-) has been the president and CEO of Zenrin since April 1, 2008. Takayama joined Zenrin in 1986 and has been its director since 2006. He graduated from Seinan Gakuin University.
