= Kitakyushu Municipal Museum of Art =

Museum in Kitakyushu, Japan

Coordinates: 33°52′11.5″N 130°49′35.5″E

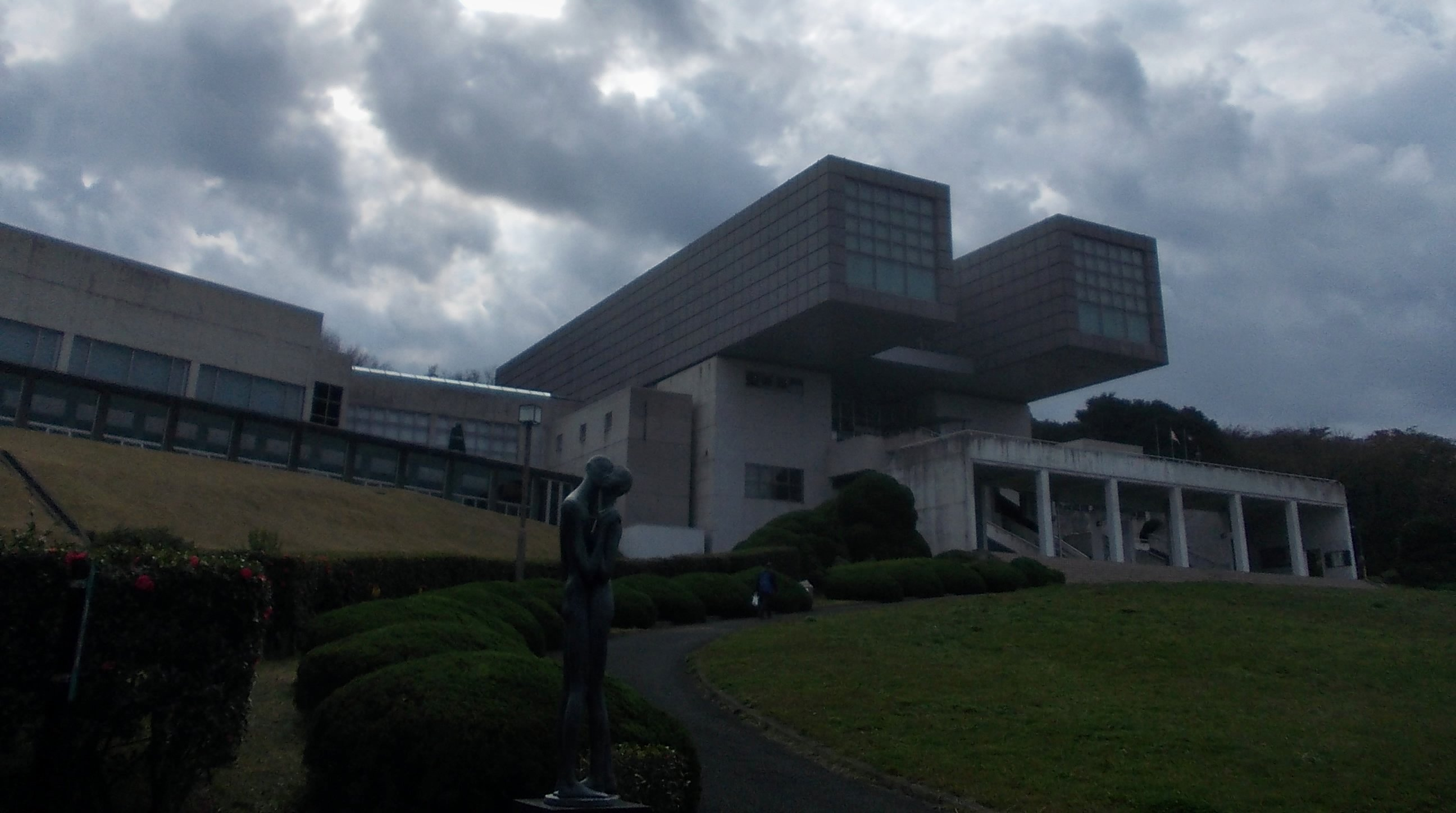
Kitakyushu Municipal Museum of Art

The Kitakyushu Municipal Museum of Art (北九州市立美術館, Kitakyūshū Shiritsu Bijutsukan) is located in Tobata-ku, Kitakyushu, Fukuoka Prefecture, Japan. Designed by Arata Isozaki, it sits on a hill straddling the three wards of Kokura Kita, Tobata, and Yahata Higashi. The museum houses more than 6,000 pieces of art, as well as offering various exhibitions throughout the year. The surrounding park not only offers a pleasant view over Tobata but is also a peaceful oasis with artwork in the form of sculptures scattered throughout.

There is a branch of the museum in Riverwalk Kitakyushu.
