= Kokurakita-ku =

Ward of Kitakyūshū in Fukuoka Prefecture, Japan

Coordinates: 33°52′51″N 130°52′25″E

Location of Kokurakita-ku in Kitakyūshū

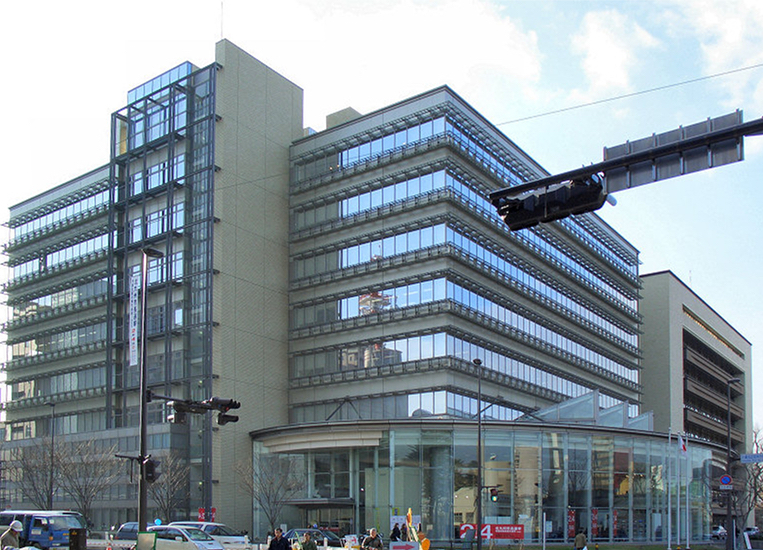
Kokurakita-ku Ward Office

Kokurakita-ku (小倉北区) is a ward of Kitakyūshū, Fukuoka, Japan. It is the north part of what used to be Kokura City before the merger of five cities to create the new city of Kitakyūshū in 1963. JR Kyūshū's Kokura Station is the main rail hub of Kitakyūshū, and the Sanyō Shinkansen stops there. It has a population of 184,545 persons as of the 2000 national census and an area of 39.27 km^{2}.

== Industry & Commerce ==
The largest commercial and shopping areas of Kitakyūshū, mainly in Uomachi (魚町 "fish town"), are clustered around Kokura Station.

The two main department stores are Colet (next to Kokura Station) and Izutsuya (next to the Murasaki River and opposite Riverwalk Kitakyūshū). The Tanga Market is a traditional open-air market where fresh fish, meat and vegetables are the main produce for sale.

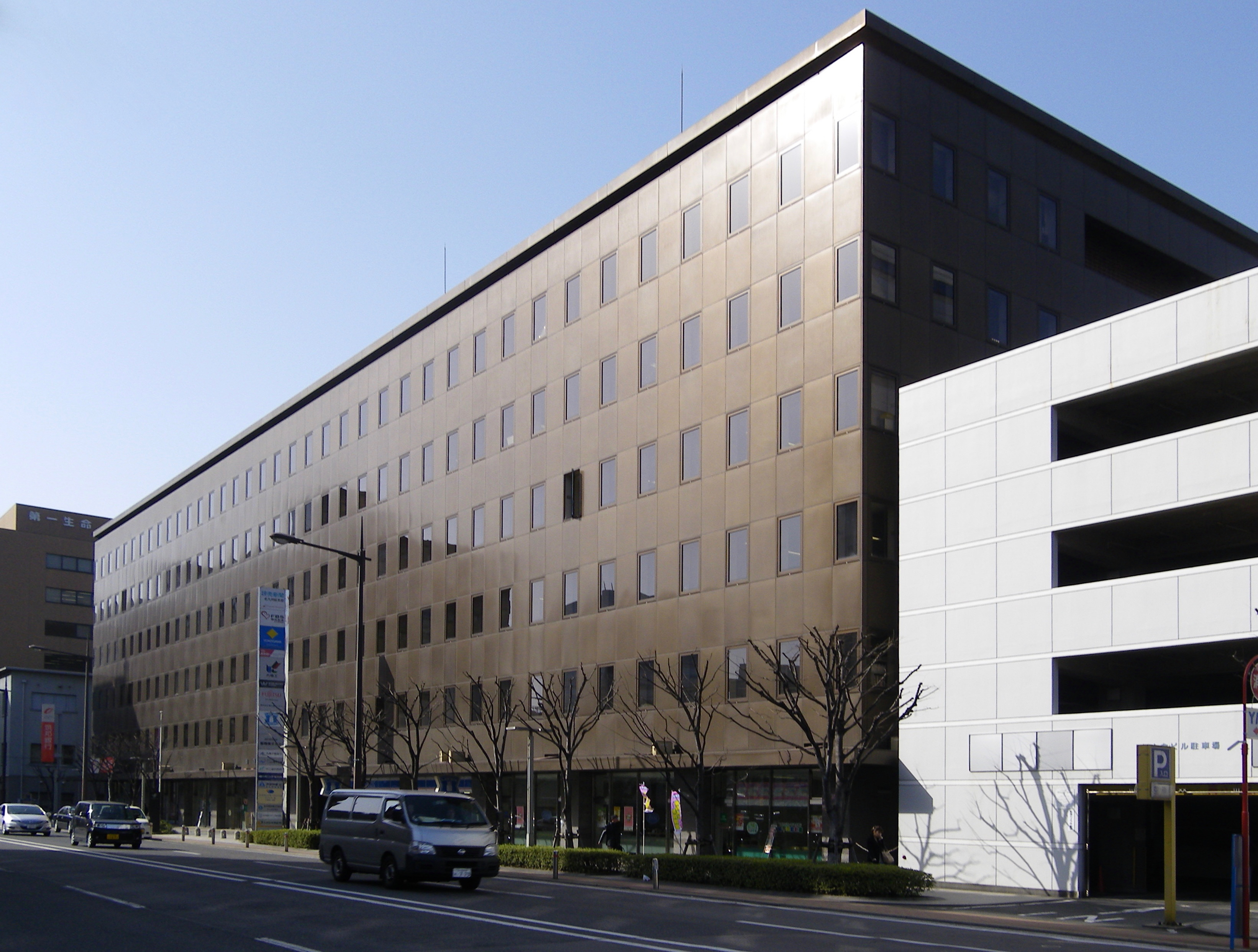
The Shin Kokura Building in Kokurakita-ku formerly housed the StarFlyer headquarters

Headquarters of companies include

- TOTO Ltd. - south of Riverwalk
- Zenrin - in Riverwalk
- Asahi Shimbun (West area) - in Riverwalk
- The head office of StarFlyer Inc. was in the Shin Kokura Building in Kome-machi. In 2010 the airline announced that the headquarters will move to Kitakyushu Airport.

== Tourism ==
Kokura Castle (built by the Hosokawa family in 1602) and the Riverwalk Kitakyūshū shopping complex (completed in 2003) are about a ten-minute walk from JR Kokura Station. So also is the house once inhabited by Mori Ōgai when he was a doctor to the Kokura garrison and wrote Kokura Nikki ("Kokura Diary").

The Kitakyūshū Monorail terminus is in Kokura Station and serves the commuters and residents living in Kokurakita and Kokuraminami Wards.

== Crime and safety ==
The Kudo-kai yakuza syndicate is headquartered in Kokurakita. A designated yakuza group, the Kudo-kai is the largest yakuza syndicate in the Kitakyushu area.

== Education ==
The ward has a North Korean kindergarten, Kokura Korean Kindergarten (小倉朝鮮幼稚園).

== Photo gallery ==
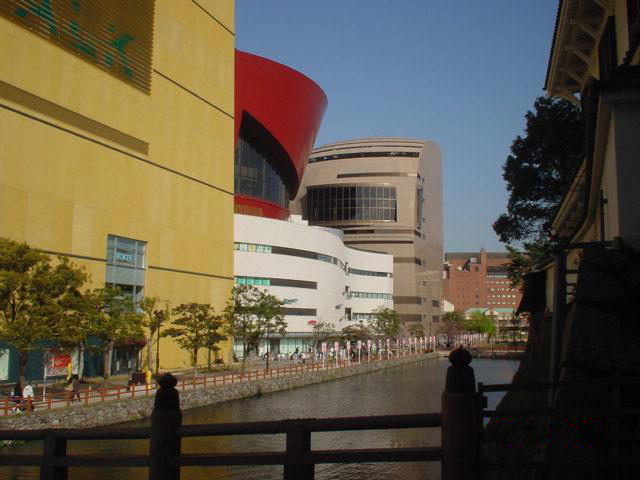
Riverwalk Kitakyūshū and Kokura Castle moat

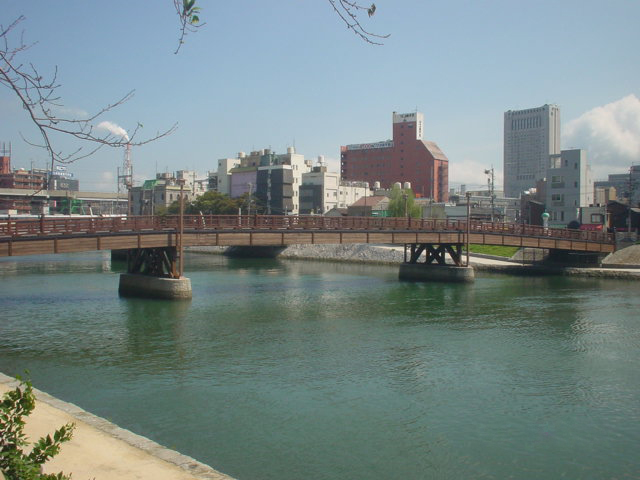
Tokiwabashi

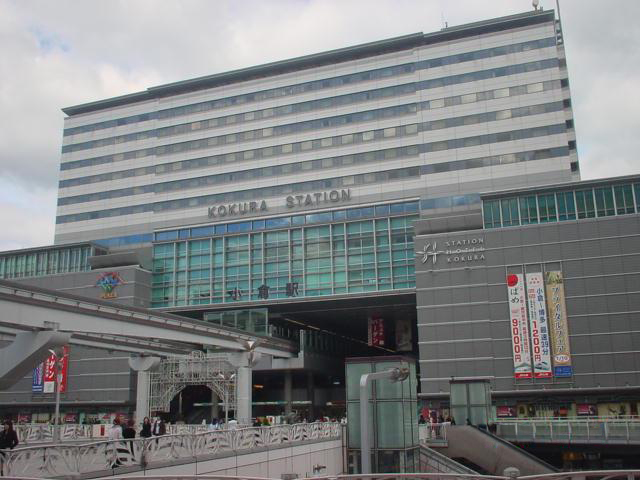
Kokura Station

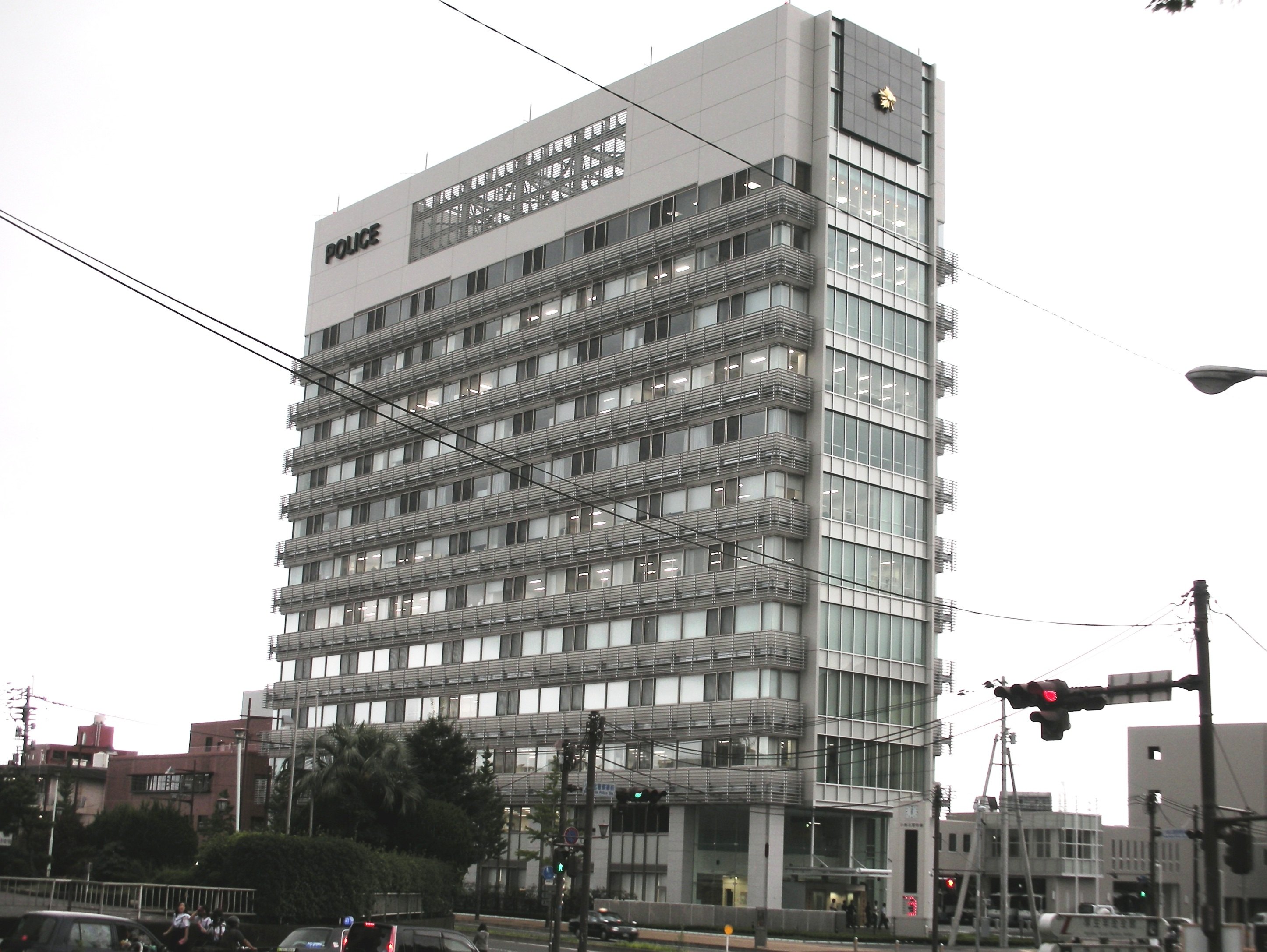
Kokura-kita Police Station

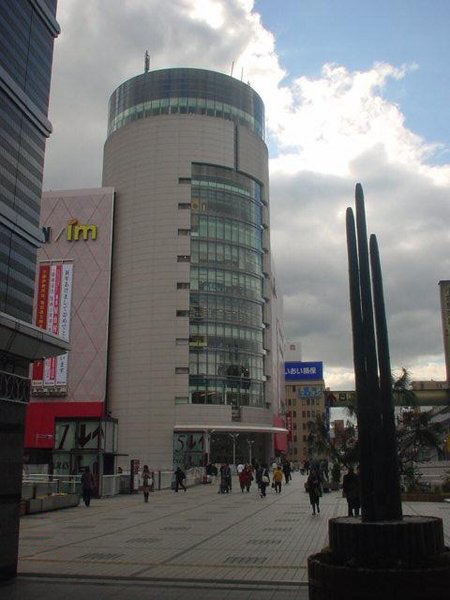
COLET(former Kokura Isetan)

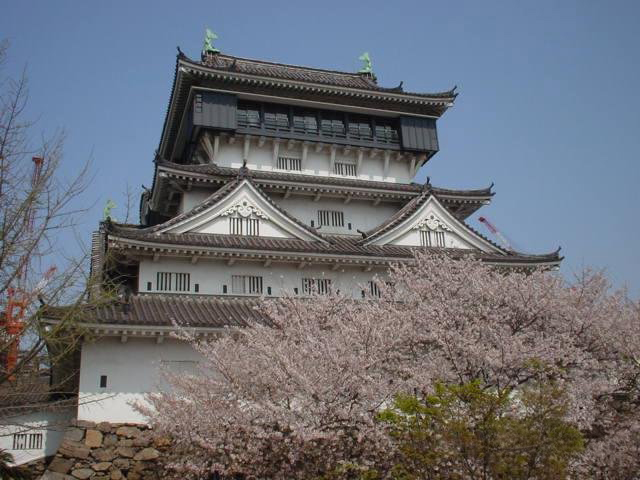
Cherry blossoms (sakura) and the keep of Kokura Castle, March 2002

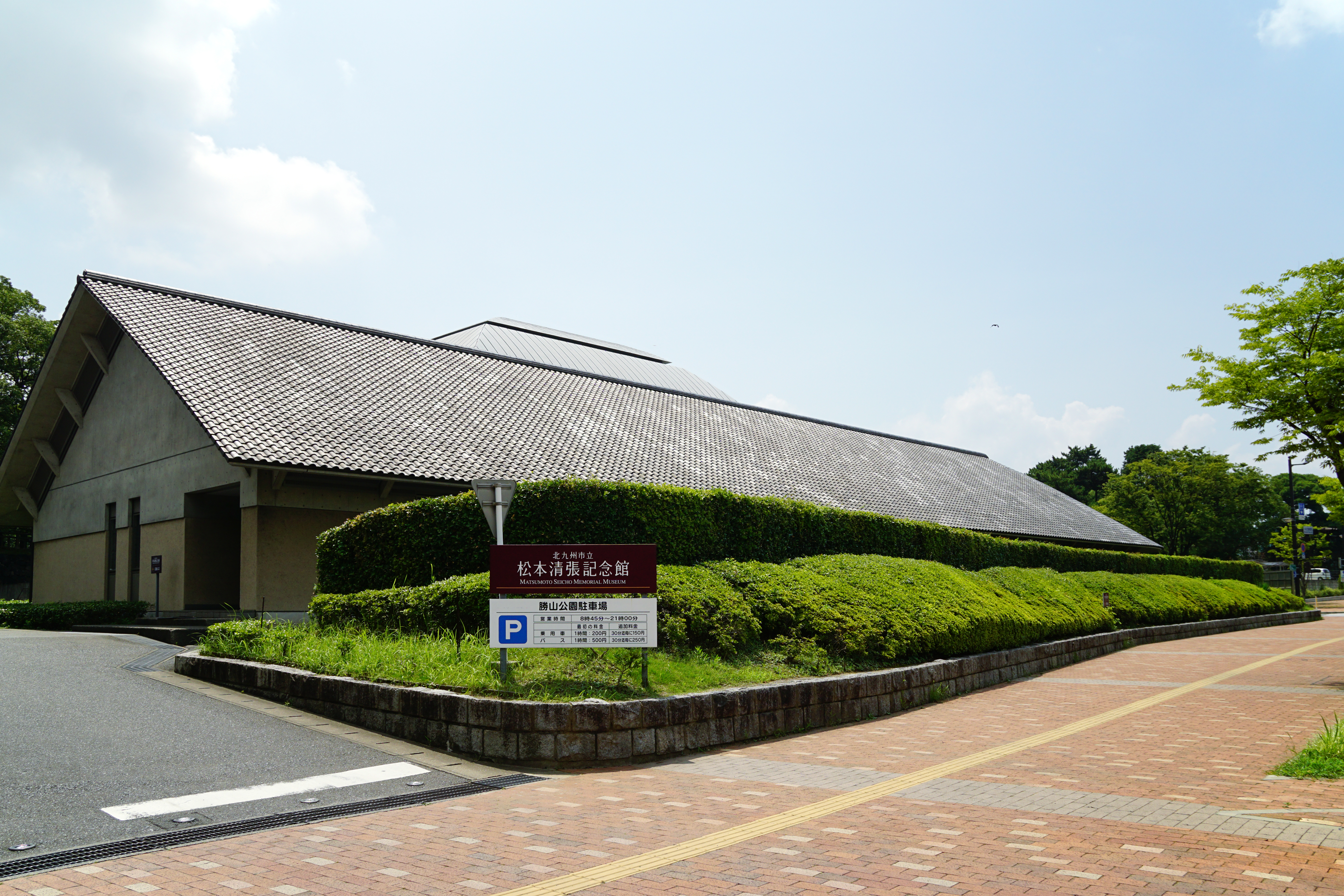
Matsumoto Seicho Memorial Museum

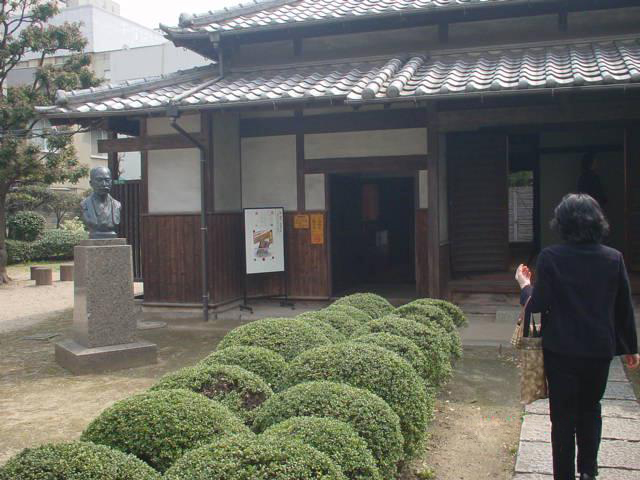
Mori Ōgai house

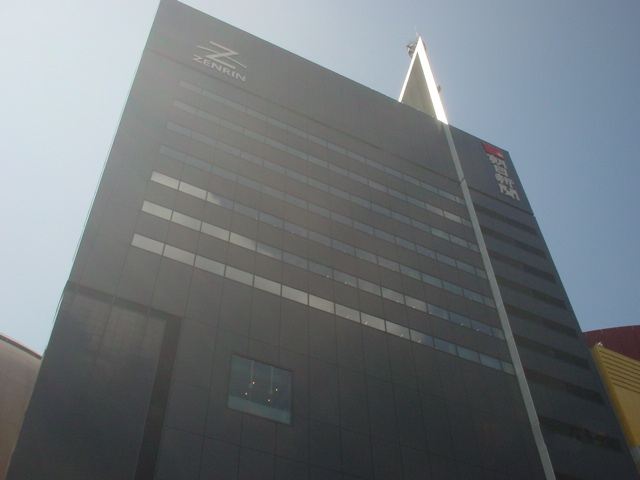
Zenrin head office

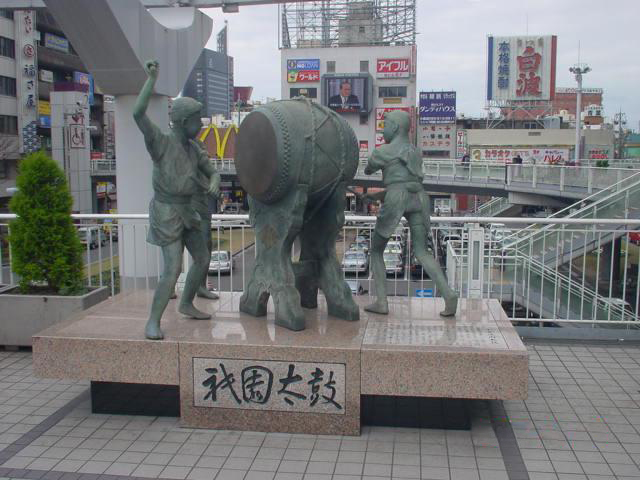
Kokura Gion Daiko statue at Kokura Station

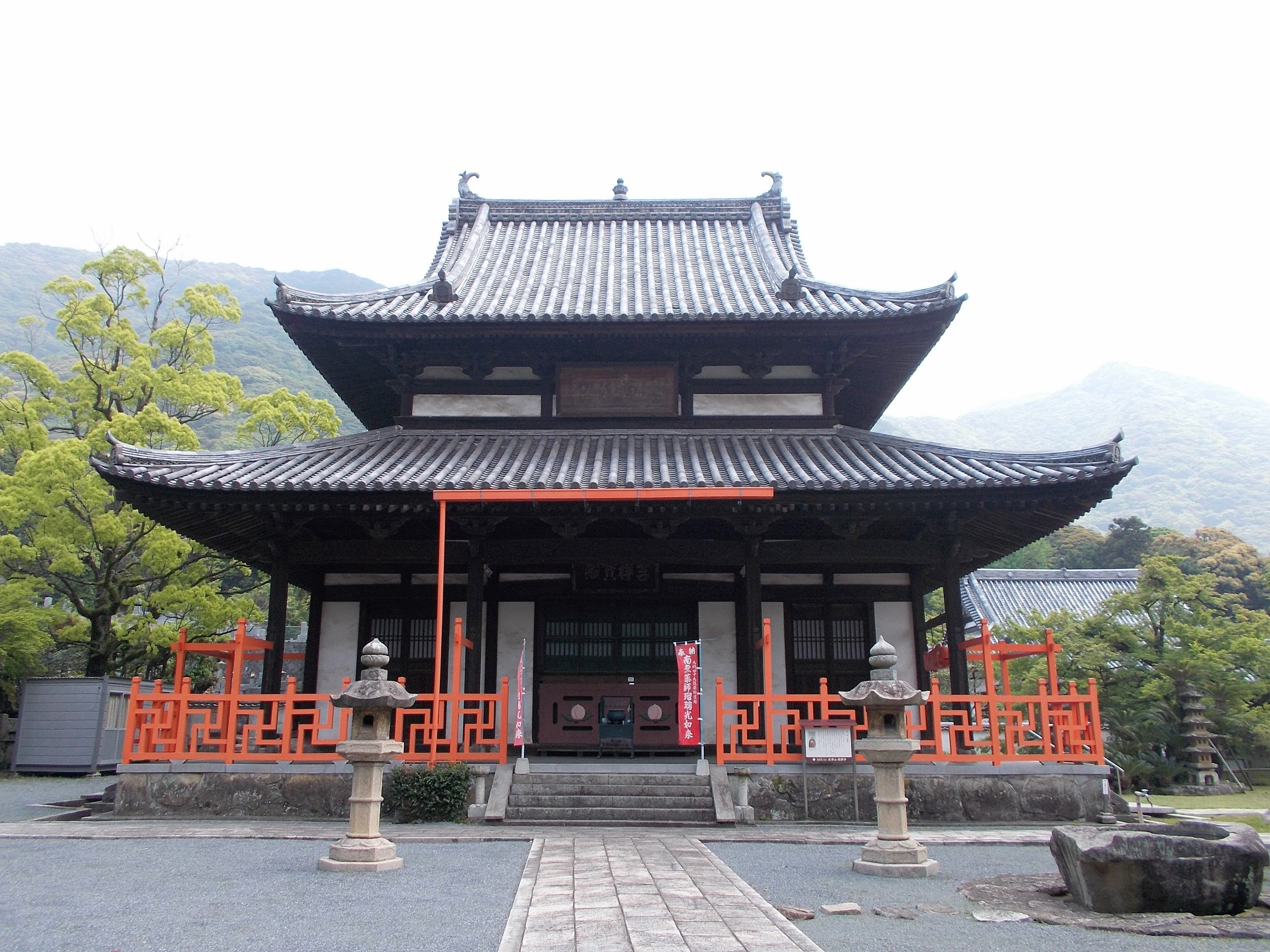
Fukuju-ji, an Ōbaku Zen temple

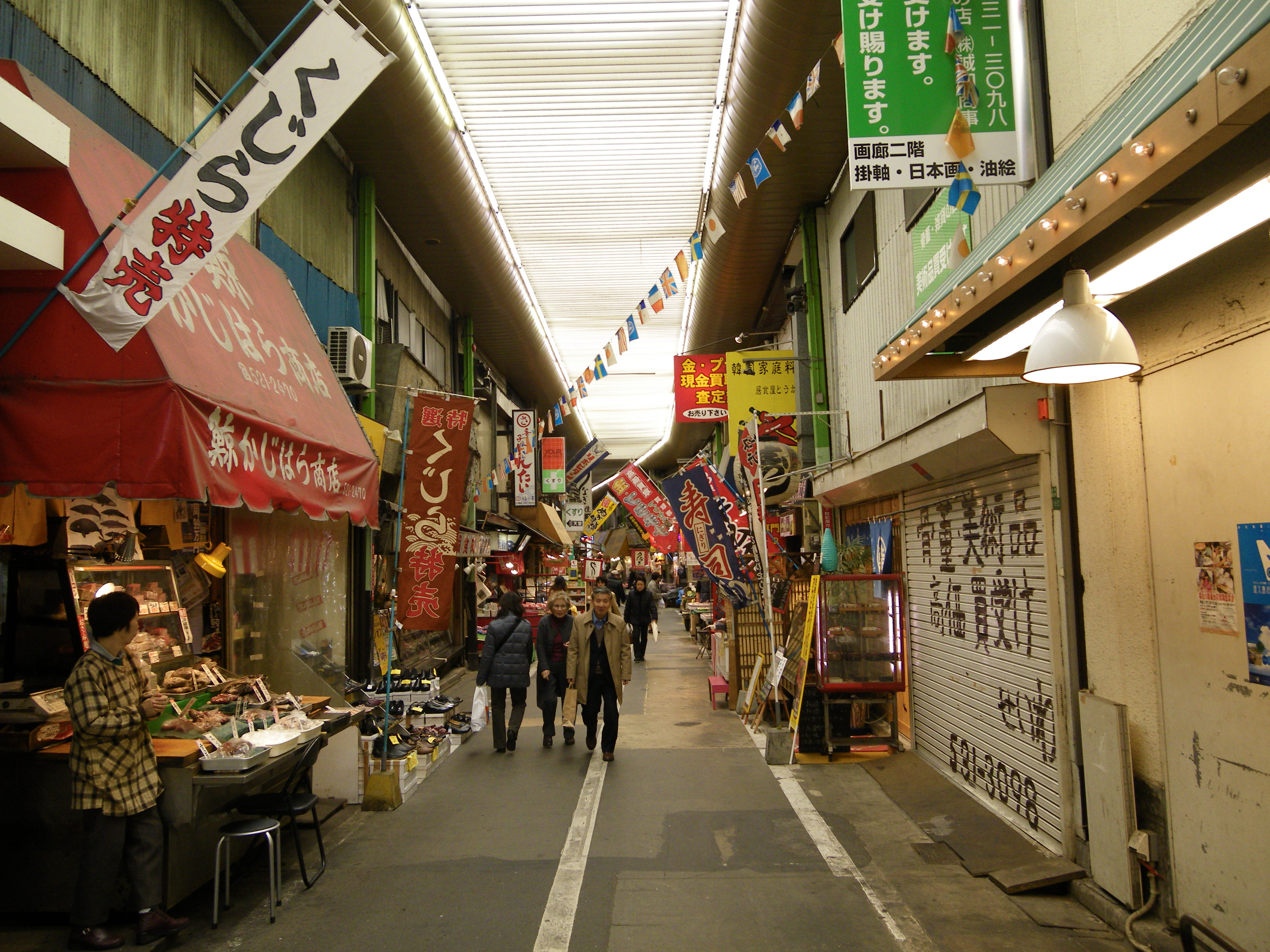
Tanga Market

== See also ==
- Kokura Prefecture
