= Kokura Airport =

Kokura Airport 小倉空港
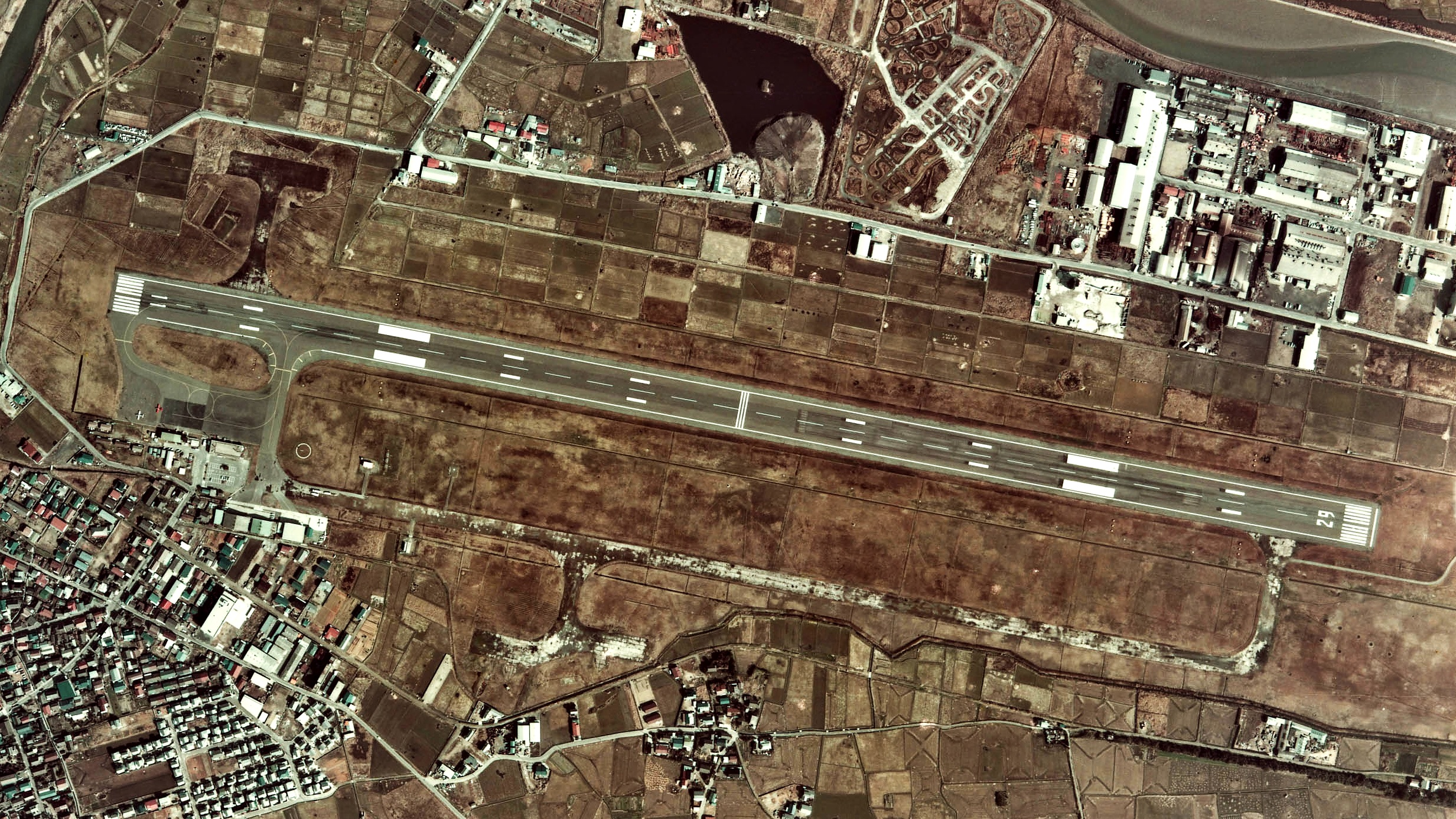
- IATA: KKJ; ICAO: RJFR

Summary
- Airport type: Defunct
- Serves: Kitakyushu
- Location: Kokura
- Elevation AMSL: 10 ft / 3 m
- Coordinates: 33°50′11″N 130°56′49″E

Map
- Location in Fukuoka Prefecture Location in Japan

Runways
Direction	Length		Surface
Direction	m	ft	Surface
11/29	1,600	5,249	Asphalt (Closed)

Kokura Airport (小倉空港, Kokura Kūkō), previously called Kitakyūshū Airport (北九州空港, Kitakyūshū Kūkō) until 2006, was a small airport in Kokura Minami-ku, Kitakyūshū, Japan. It is a Japanese airport established and managed by the Minister of Land, Infrastructure, Transport and Tourism.

There used to be four flights to and from Tokyo Haneda every day. The runway was 1,600 m (5,249 ft) long, so only mid-sized aircraft such as the Airbus A320 and Boeing 737 could use this airport, albeit with a reduced payload.

It is now commonly referred to as Kokura, its location, to distinguish it from the New Kitakyushu Airport (renamed Kitakyushu Airport in 2008), an offshore airport built on a man-made island in Suo nada, the most westerly part of the Seto Inland Sea. The new airport opened in March 2006, taking over the old airport codes (IATA: KKJ, ICAO: RJFR).
