= Matsumoto Seicho Memorial Museum =

- 北九州市立松本清張記念館
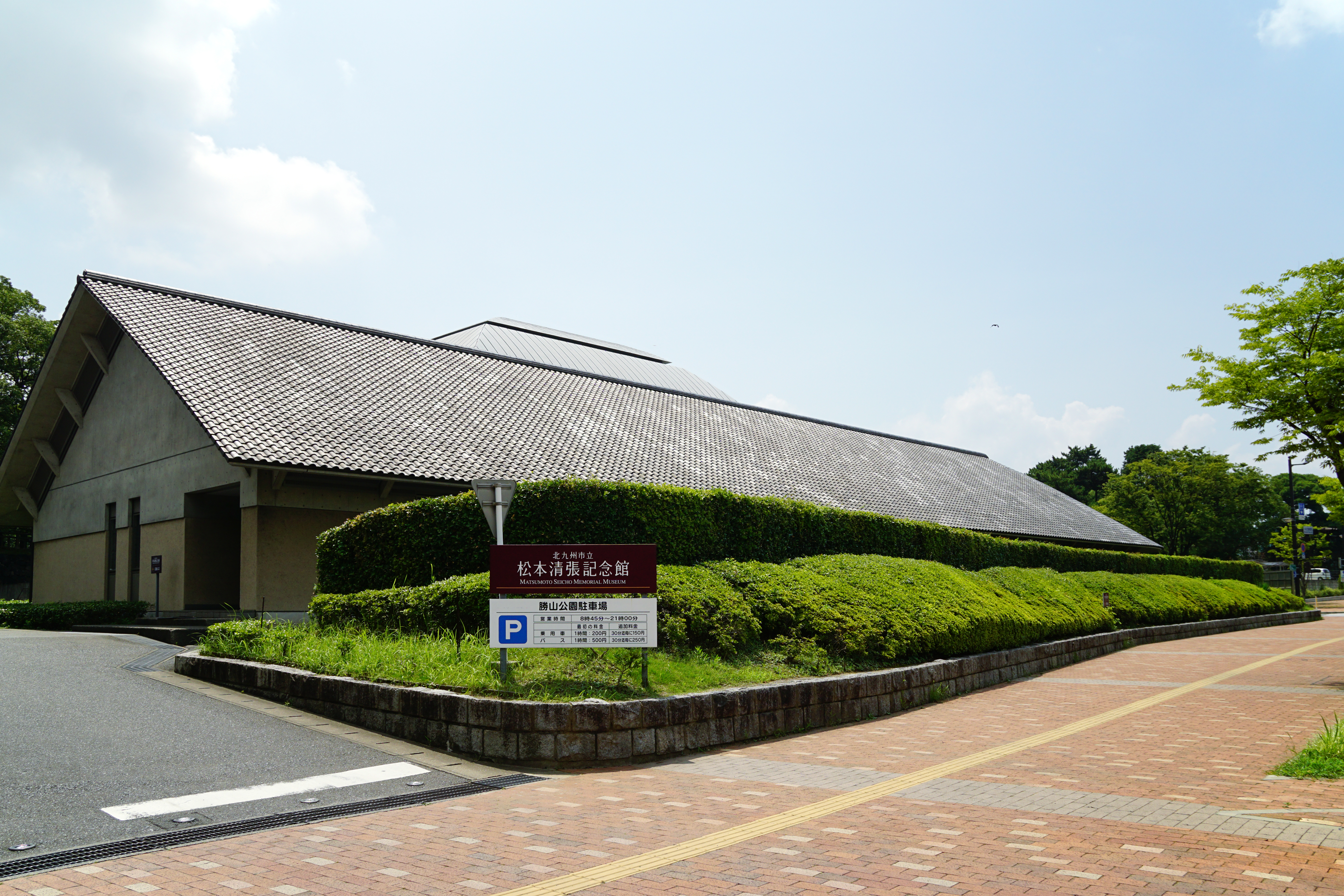
- Established: 4 August 1998; 27 years ago
- Location: Kitakyushu, Fukuoka Prefecture, Japan
- Coordinates: 33°53′01.00″N 130°52′21.30″E
- Type: Literature museum
- Public transit access: JR Kyusyu: at Kokura Station (JA 28 JF 01 JI 01 ) or Nishi-Kokura Station (JA 27 JF 02 JI 02 )
- Website: Official website

The Matsumoto Seicho Memorial Museum (松本清張記念館, Matsumoto Seichō Kinenkan) is a literature museum in Kitakyushu, Japan. It is dedicated to Seichō Matsumoto, who spent the first half of his life in Kitakyusyu. The museum is located next to Kokura Castle.

== Features of the Museum ==
The museum displays exhibits and graphic panels to introduce a collection of Seichō Matsumoto's works and the related items (manuscript, letter, artwork, his favorite goods, etc.). The author's study room, library, and reception room, called "The Castle of Thought and Creation", are exhibited in the museum. They were relocated from his residence in Suginami-ward, Tokyo in which he spent the latter half of his life. In addition to these permanent exhibitions, special exhibitions regarding the author are often held.

The museum also has a role of research center related to Seichō Matsumoto, and publishes the research journal annually. It awarded Kikuchi Kan Prize in 2008 for the research activities.

== Museum data ==
- Construction: Two-storey building in reinforced concrete and precast concrete
- Building area: 1,583.50 m^{2}
- Total floor area: 3,391.69 m^{2}
- Building plan: Tadanaga Miyamoto(宮本 忠長) Architect and Associates
- Address: Jōnai 2-3-3, Kokurakita-ku, Kitakyushu, Fukuoka Prefecture 803-0813

== See also ==
- Kokura Castle
