= Furuichi Ryōwa =

Furuichi Ryōwa 古市了和
- Born: Unknown
- Died: 1657
- Known for: Founder of the Ogasawara Ko-ryū school of tea ceremony Associated tea masters: Murata Jukō, Furuichi Chōin, Furuta Oribe,

Furuichi Ryōwa was a tea master from the Edo Period and 4th generation iemoto (grand master) of the Ogasawara Ko-ryū school of chanoyu. Ryōwa had a close friendship with Furuta Oribe and received secret teachings of chanoyu from Oribe. This was a student-teacher relationship. Ryōwa's ancestor Furuichi Chōin was a disciple of Murata Shukō and the addressee of Shukō's "Letter of the Heart" (kokoro-no-fumi), the most famous document on the essential philosophy and spiritual discipline of chanoyu.

== Career ==
In the early Edo Period, Ogasawara Tadazane (1596-1667), the lord of the Kokura Domain, hired Ryōwa as Sadō (tea master). Ryōwa established his own school with this post, calling it the Ogasawara Ko-ryū. The term "ko" is the same Chinese character (古) as in his family name Furuichi (古市), but uses an alternate pronunciation.

Ryōwa claimed his family lineage for the Ogasawara Ko school, making him the 4th generation grandmaster after Furuichi Inei. Inei was a famous master of tōcha tea gatherings who conducted extravagant events at Nara's Kōfuku-ji temple. Inei's younger brother, Chōin, was also versed in the tōcha style, but later became attracted to Murata Shukō's new approach to tea as an outward expression of the inner life of Buddhism. Chōin studied under Shukō as is evident from the Letter of the Heart. Chōin's grandson, Furuichi Jyōin, became the third successor of the Furuichi style of tea before Jyōin's adopted son, Ryōwa, established the Furuichi-style of tea as the Ogasawara Ko-ryū.

Ryōma is buried at Kokura Castle, Shitaho-ji Temple.

== Legacy ==
The Furuichi family continued in the role of Sadō of the Ogasawara feudal lord until the end of the Edo Period. In 1973, the 32nd head of the Ogasawara family, Ogasawara Tadamune, assumed the head of the Ogasawara Ko school of chanoyu to promote a resurgence of the school.
