= Riverwalk Kitakyushu =

Japanese shopping mall

Coordinates: 33.8858°N 130.8753°E

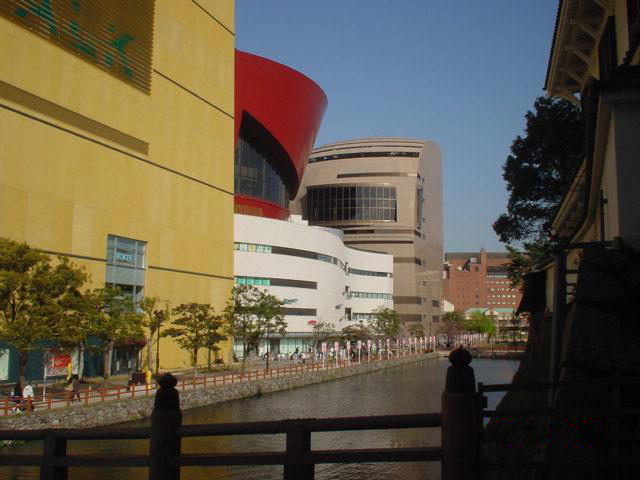
Riverwalk Kitakyushu and the Kokura castle moat

Riverwalk Kitakyushu (リバーウォーク北九州, Ribāwōku Kitakyūshū) is a shopping centre near the Murasaki River and Kokura Castle in Kokura Kita ward, Kitakyushu, Japan. It was opened as part of the Kitakyushu Renaissance policy on April 19, 2003. It includes theatres, restaurants, a multiplex cinema, NHK studios, the head offices of Zenrin Co. and the Asahi Shimbun (West area), and a branch of the Kitakyushu city art museum.

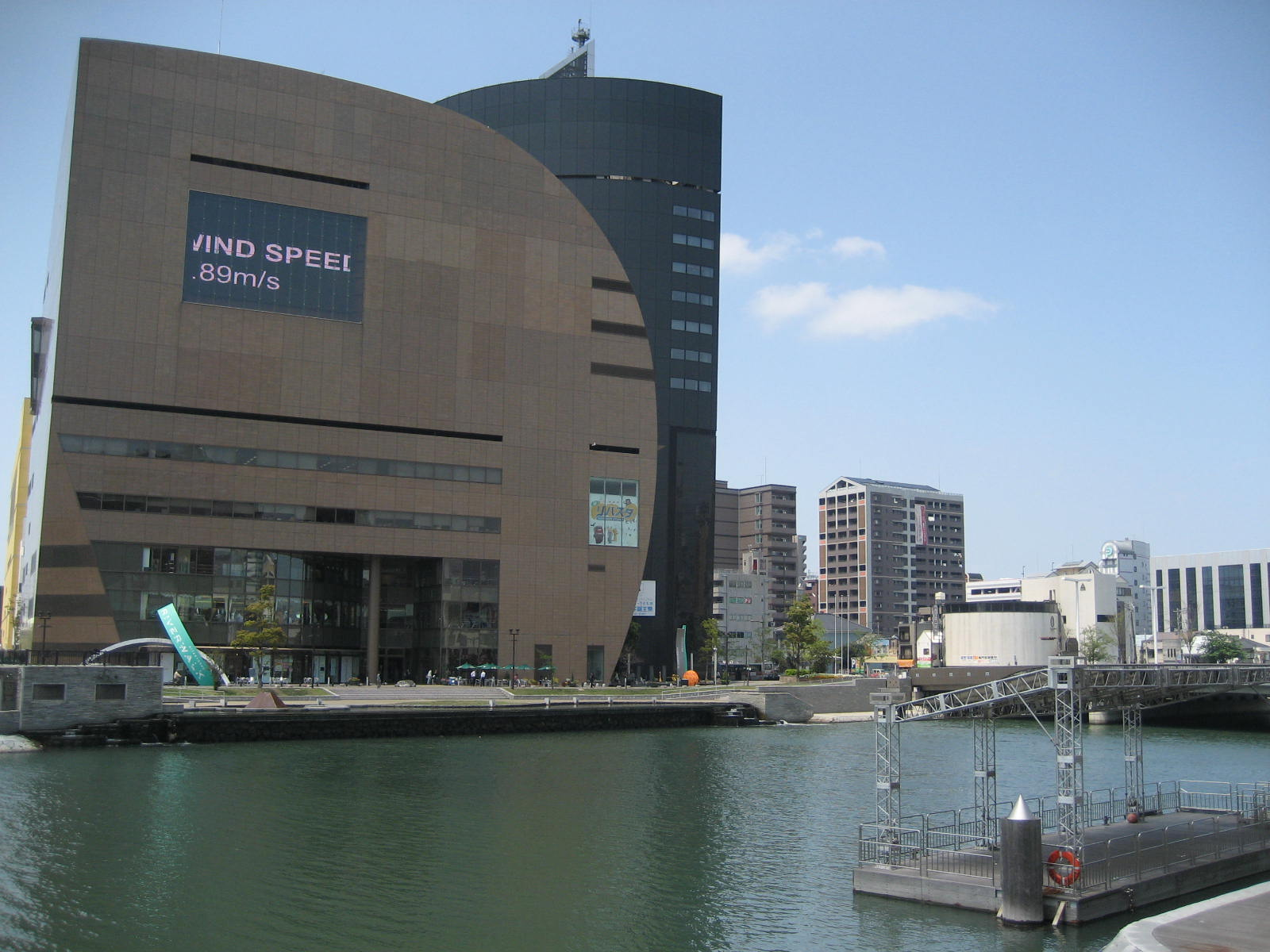
East side of Riverwalk building

== Design ==
The design is composed of five contrasting geometrical shapes in five colours (yellow, red, white, brown and black) to break the massive complex into acceptable proportions.

== Map museum ==
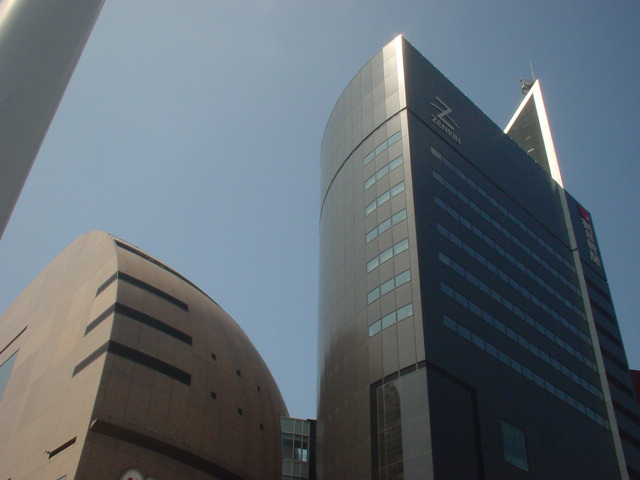
The NHK building (brown) and Zenrin-Asahi Shinbun building (black)

On the 14th floor of the Zenrin-Asahi Shinbun building is the Zenrin map museum. The entrance fee is 100 yen. It is open on weekdays, 10.00-17.00.

== Second stage ==
The next stage is the construction of the new 11-story Kokura campus of Nishinippon Institute of Technology, which will contain the design faculty and a four-story Toyota Lexus showroom.

== See also ==
- Kokura prefectural office
- Milwaukee Riverwalk in the United States

Jon Jerde-associated architectural projects in Japan:

- Canal City Hakata (Fukuoka)
- Namba Parks (Osaka)
- Roppongi Hills (Tokyo)

== External sources ==
- (in English) Riverwalk on Nihon Sekkei website
- (in English) Riverwalk on the Jerde Partnership website
- (in English) Riverwalk Kitakyushu official page
