= StarFlyer =

Japanese low-cost airline

StarFlyer スターフライヤー Sutāfuraiyā

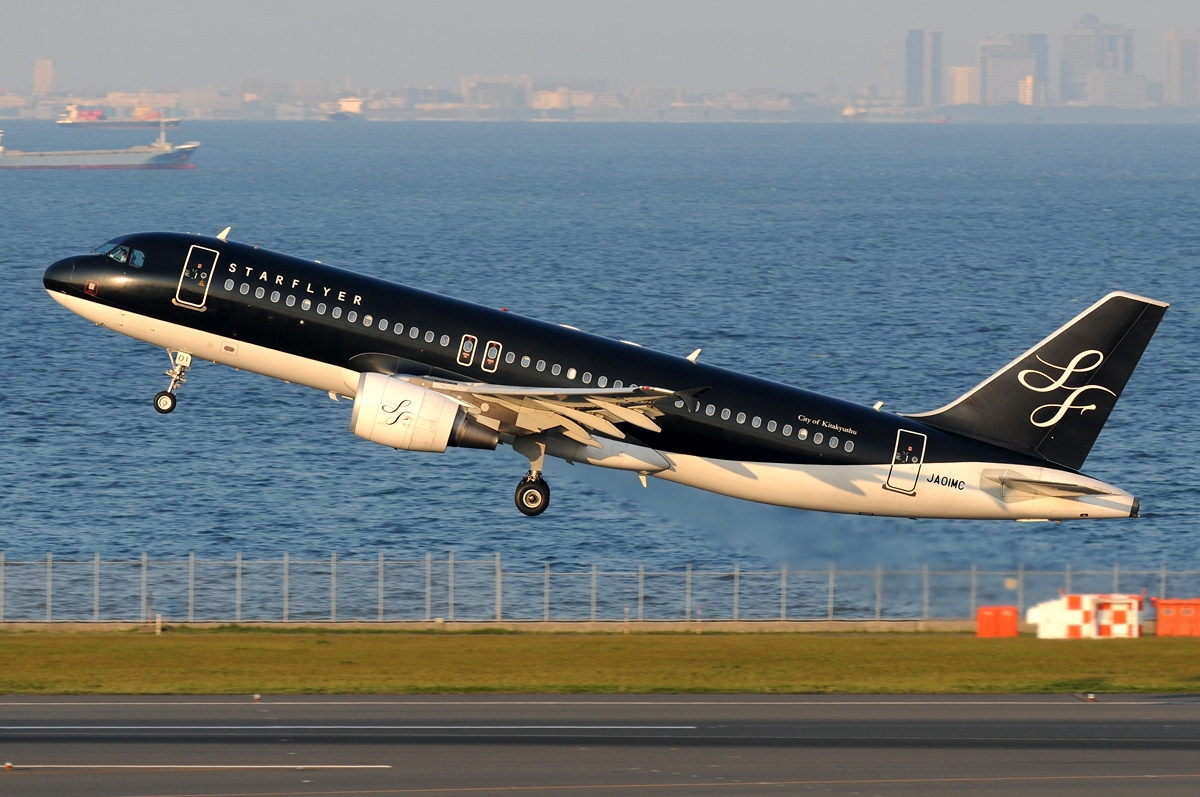
- StarFlyer A320-214 in standard livery
IATA	ICAO	Call sign
7G	SFJ	STARFLYER
- Founded: December 17, 2002; 23 years ago (as Kobe Airlines)
- Commenced operations: March 16, 2006; 20 years ago
- Operating bases: Kitakyushu; Tokyo–Haneda
- Frequent-flyer program: Star Link
- Fleet size: 11
- Destinations: 7
- Traded as: TYO: 9206
- Headquarters: Kitakyushu Airport, Kitakyūshū, Fukuoka Prefecture, Japan
- Key people: Osamu Machida (President)
- Revenue: ▲JPY 25.1 billion (FY2013)
- Net income: ▼JPY 287 million (FY2013)
- Total assets: ▲JPY 17.1 billion (FY2013)
- Total equity: ▲JPY 4.8 billion (FY2013)
- Employees: 824 (June 25, 2020)
- Website: www.starflyer.jp

Star Flyer Inc. (株式会社スターフライヤー, Kabushiki-gaisha Sutāfuraiyā), styled as StarFlyer, is a Japanese airline headquartered on the grounds of Kitakyushu Airport in Kokuraminami-ku, Kitakyūshū, Fukuoka Prefecture. It describes itself as a "hybrid airline" providing a higher level of service than low-cost carriers while having operating costs lower than full-service legacy carriers. Although the airline's IATA code is 7G, domestically it has also used the code MQ (which is designated outside Japan by the IATA to Envoy Air) for its flights.

== History ==
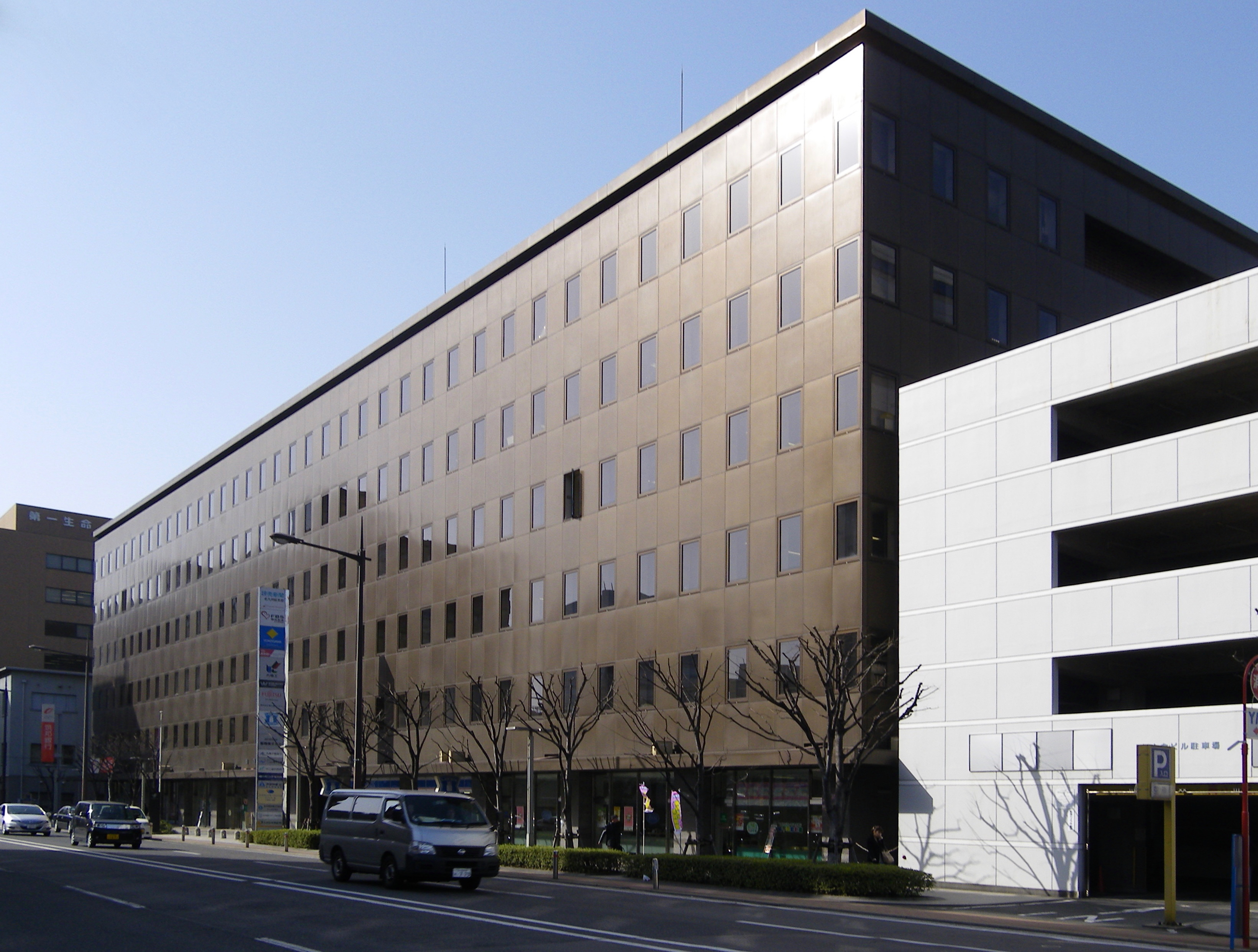
The Shin Kokura Building formerly housed the StarFlyer headquarters.

StarFlyer was founded as Kobe Airlines (神戸航空, Kōbe Kōkū) on December 17, 2002 with the intention of being based at the new Kobe Airport. The company changed its name to StarFlyer in May 2003, and moved to Kitakyushu at the end of 2003. The airline was founded by former Japan Airlines technician Takaaki Hori and former All Nippon Airways executive Yasushi Muto, who respectively served as president and senior vice president of the company until 2009. Its headquarters were initially in the Shin Kokura Building (新小倉ビル, Shin Kokura Biru) in Kokura Kita-ku, Kitakyūshū; in 2010 the airline announced that the headquarters would move to Kitakyushu Airport.

StarFlyer began service upon the opening of New Kitakyushu Airport on March 16, 2006.

All Nippon Airways (ANA) began an operational relationship with StarFlyer in 2005, allowing StarFlyer to use its computerized reservations system. This relationship expanded to code sharing in 2007, under which StarFlyer service between Haneda and Kitakyushu (and later between Haneda and Fukuoka) was marketed under ANA's airline code. The code sharing immediately boosted StarFlyer's load factors from 59% to over 70%.

In April 2008, the company announced that it would begin charter flights to Seoul in July. The airline said it would evaluate the flights to consider whether to start regular service between the two cities (in the meantime, its call center handled reservations for Jeju Air on this route). In addition, it had also prepared to start charter service to Hong Kong. StarFlyer operated packaged tour charter flights from Kitakyushu to Guam in August 2013 with an aim to provide more "program charter" services in the future.

StarFlyer initially planned an initial public offering (IPO) in fiscal year 2008, but poor financial and operating performance delayed the IPO; among other issues, the airline failed to use appropriate fuel hedging to control its costs, and also had limited ability to raise capital. Hori and Muto resigned from their positions in June 2009, and Shinichi Yonehara, a former Mitsui & Co. aircraft trading executive, became president of the company. Under Yonehara's leadership, the airline completed its IPO on the Tokyo Stock Exchange in December 2011.

The airline suffered a massive cancellation following the 2011 Tōhoku earthquake and tsunami, as 13 of its 29 pilots at the time were non-Japanese, and seven of them were overseas and had refused or were unable to return to Japan.

In December 2012, ANA announced that it had acquired an 18% stake in StarFlyer, making it the largest shareholder in the airline.

In 2013, StarFlyer announced that it would start service between Fukuoka and Kansai International Airport in Osaka, targeting business travelers on a highly competitive city pair where the Sanyo Shinkansen high-speed rail service has a market share of around 80%. StarFlyer announced that it would offer discount fares starting at 4,500 yen to compete with both rail service and the discount airline Peach.

StarFlyer announced a restructuring in November 2013, as part of which it would cut 30 of its employees, suspend its service to Busan effective March 30, 2014, and reduce its fleet from eleven to nine aircraft. StarFlyer was also considering raising fares on its key domestic routes from Haneda to Kitakyushu and Fukuoka.

Three years after its last scheduled international flights to South Korea, StarFlyer in October 2017 announced the relaunch of international services with flights to Taoyuan International Airport in Taiwan from Fukuoka, Kitakyushu, and Nagoya Centrair to begin the following year in October 2018. While the plans for flights between Taiwan and Fukuoka were dropped prior to launch, services between Taiwan and both Kitakyushu and Nagoya Centrair proceeded to begin on October 28, 2018.

During the COVID-19 pandemic that began in March 2020, StarFlyer reduced its operations and suspended its international routes to Taipei, before the airline later cancelled its flights between Kitakyushu and Naha with no plans to resume the services. In December 2022, the airline announced it would be relaunching its international services initially with charter flights between Kitakyushu and Taipei, operating during January and February 2023.

== Corporate affairs ==
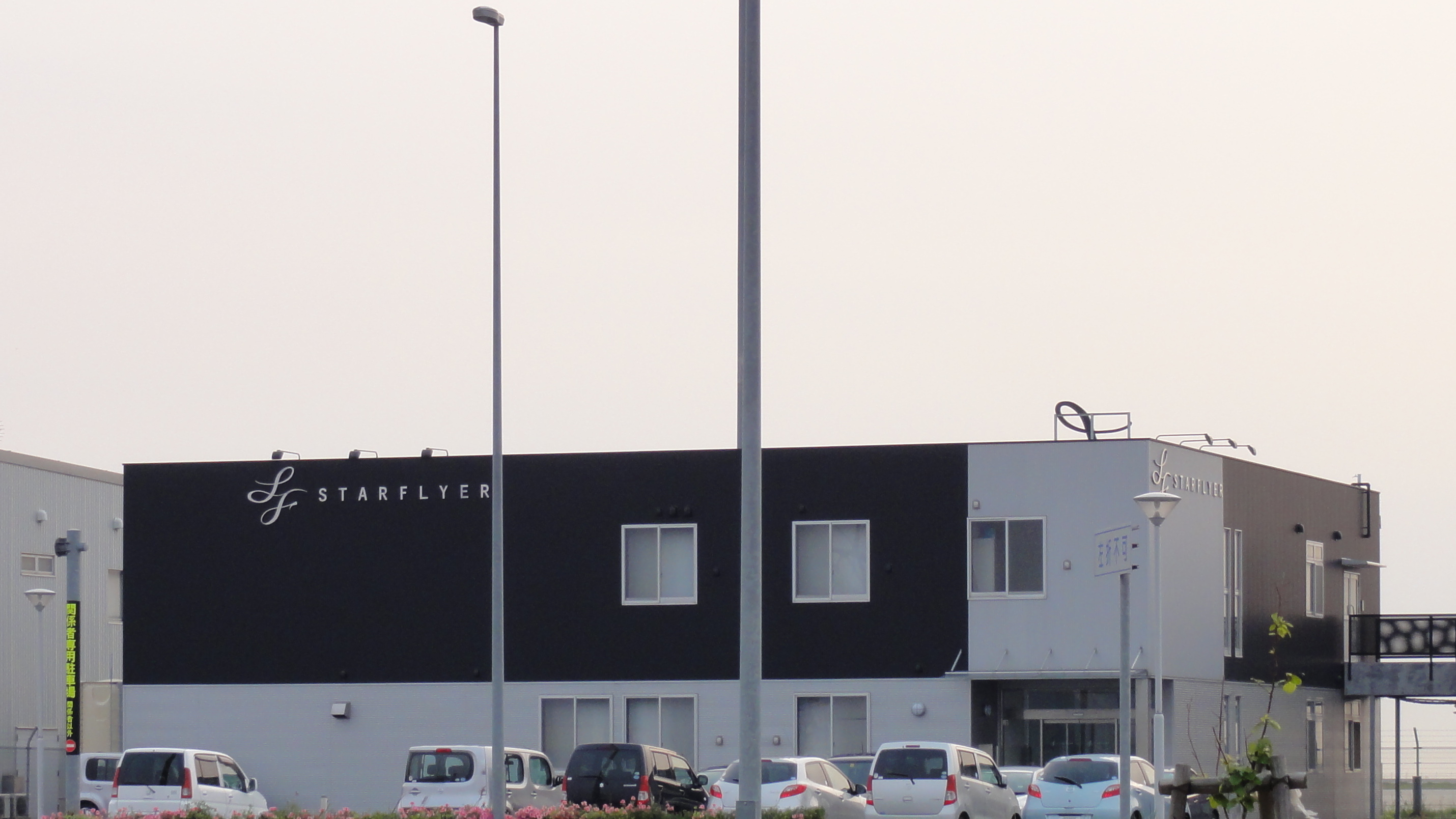
StarFlyer headquarters

As of March 2013, ANA Holdings is the largest shareholder in the company with a 17.96% stake, and several companies that have major operations in the northern Kyushu region are also significant shareholders, including TOTO, Yaskawa Electric Corporation, Kyushu Electric Power Company and Nissan Motor Company.

Kitakyushu Bank has a credit card mileage partnership with StarFlyer. Yamaguchi Financial Group, the parent company of Kitakyushu Bank, made publicized efforts to support StarFlyer's Busan service by approaching businesses, tourism organizations and Japanese expatriate groups in the Busan region.

StarFlyer provides ground handling services for Delta Air Lines at Haneda Airport in Tokyo.

== Destinations ==
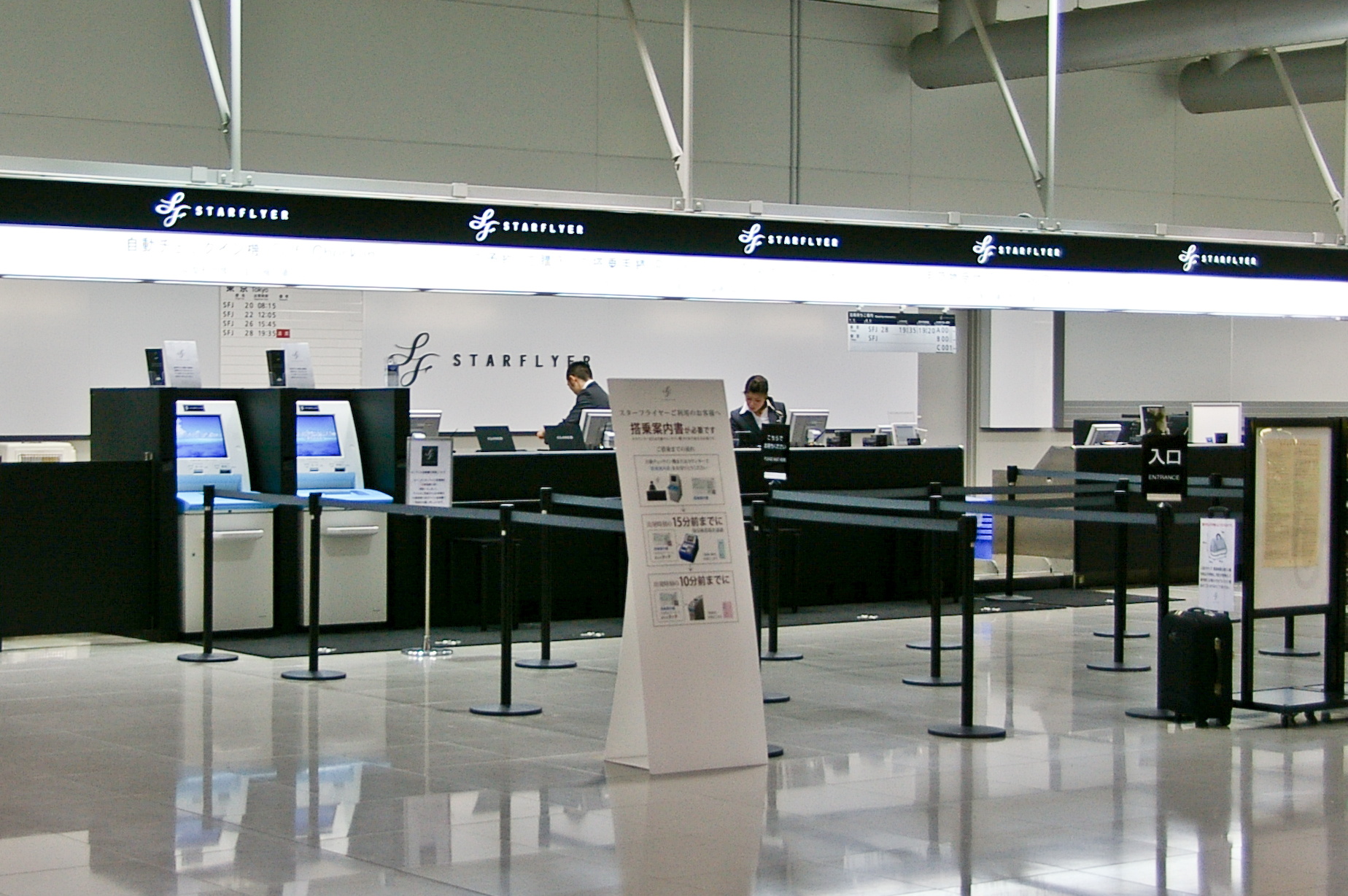
StarFlyer check-in counters at Kansai International Airport

StarFlyer has operated a mix of scheduled and chartered flights to the following destinations as of January 2023.

=== Scheduled ===
StarFlyer has operated scheduled services to the following destinations:

Country (Region)	City	Airport	Notes	Refs
Japan (Honshū)	Nagoya	Chubu Centrair International Airport		
Japan (Honshū)	Osaka	Kansai International Airport		
Japan (Honshū)	Tokyo	Haneda Airport	Base	
Japan (Honshū)	Ube	Yamaguchi Ube Airport		
Japan (Kyūshū)	Fukuoka	Fukuoka Airport		
Japan (Kyūshū)	Kitakyūshū	Kitakyushu Airport	Base	
Japan (Ryukyu Islands)	Naha	Naha Airport	Terminated	
South Korea	Busan	Gimhae International Airport	Terminated	
Taiwan	Taipei	Taoyuan International Airport		

=== Charter ===
StarFlyer has also previously operated charter services to the following destinations:

Country or region	City	Airport	Notes	Refs
Guam	Hagåtña	Antonio B. Won Pat International Airport	Terminated	
Hong Kong	Hong Kong	Hong Kong International Airport	Terminated	
South Korea	Busan	Gimhae International Airport	Terminated	
South Korea	Muan	Muan International Airport	Terminated	

=== Codeshare agreements ===
StarFlyer has codeshare agreements with the following airlines:

- All Nippon Airways
- Solaseed Air

== Fleet ==
=== Current fleet ===
As of July 2026, StarFlyer operates the following aircraft:

StarFlyer fleet
Aircraft	In service	Orders	Passengers	Notes
Airbus A320-200	7	—	150	
Airbus A320neo	4	2	162	Replacing older aircraft, with options for four additional units.
Total	11	2		

=== Fleet development ===
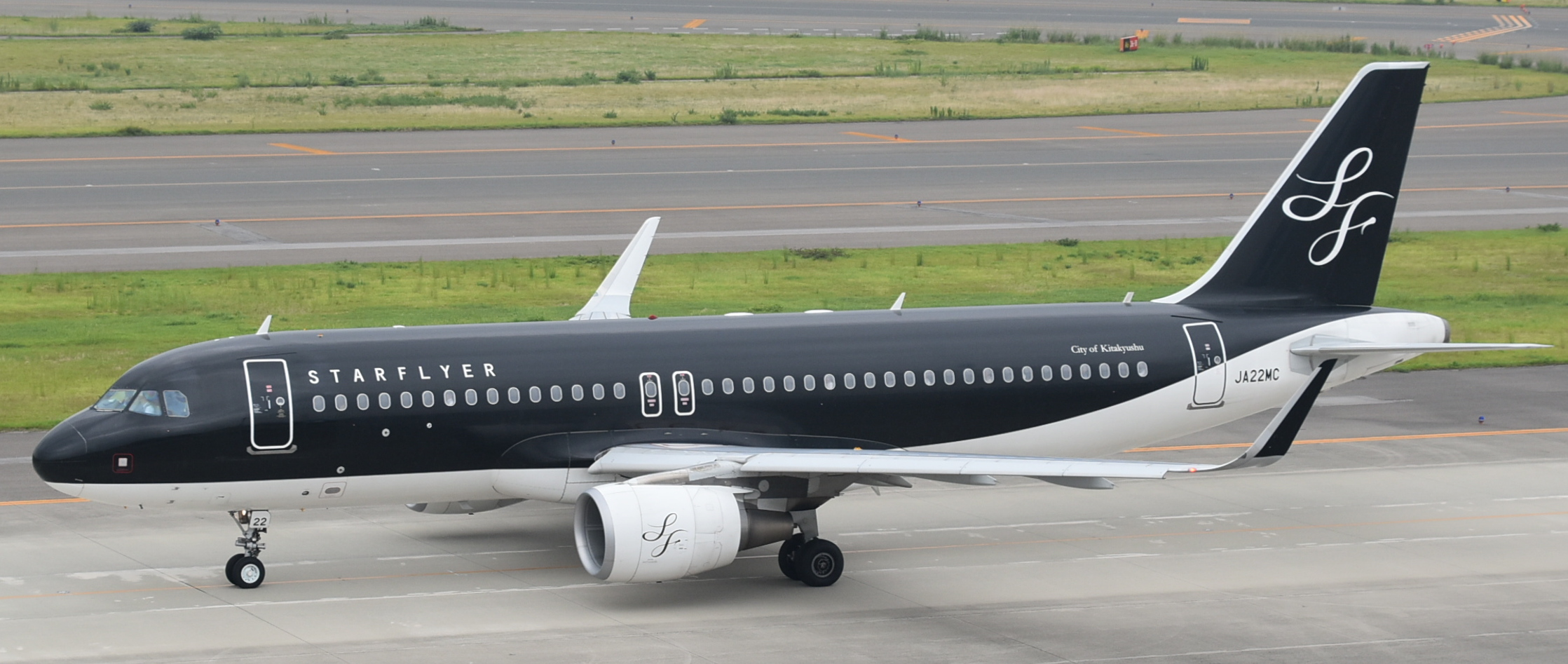
A StarFlyer Airbus A320-200

Most of the StarFlyer A320 fleet is leased from GECAS and AWAS, but the airline purchased three A320s to replace older leased aircraft; JA01MC was retired on April 30, 2014 to bring its fleet to a total of ten aircraft, of which five aircraft were to be leased in the future. In October 2020, StarFlyer announced the leasing of up to five A320neo aircraft from SMBC Aviation Capital, with deliveries beginning in January 2023 in order to replace older A320-200 aircraft, and the agreement expected to be completed by February 2021. By December 2022, the airline reported that the expected delivery of its first A320neo in January 2023 was delayed, with the airline subsequently cancelling several flights between January and March 2023. The first A320neo was delivered during June 2023, before entering service on July 4, 2023.

On May 24, the airline announced its board approved a resolution to lease up to five more A320neos from ANA Holdings. The contract, which is expected to be finalized in August 2024, includes three firm orders and two options.

=== Former fleet ===
As of August 2025, StarFlyer operated 8 Airbus A320-200 and 2 Airbus A320neo.

=== Livery ===
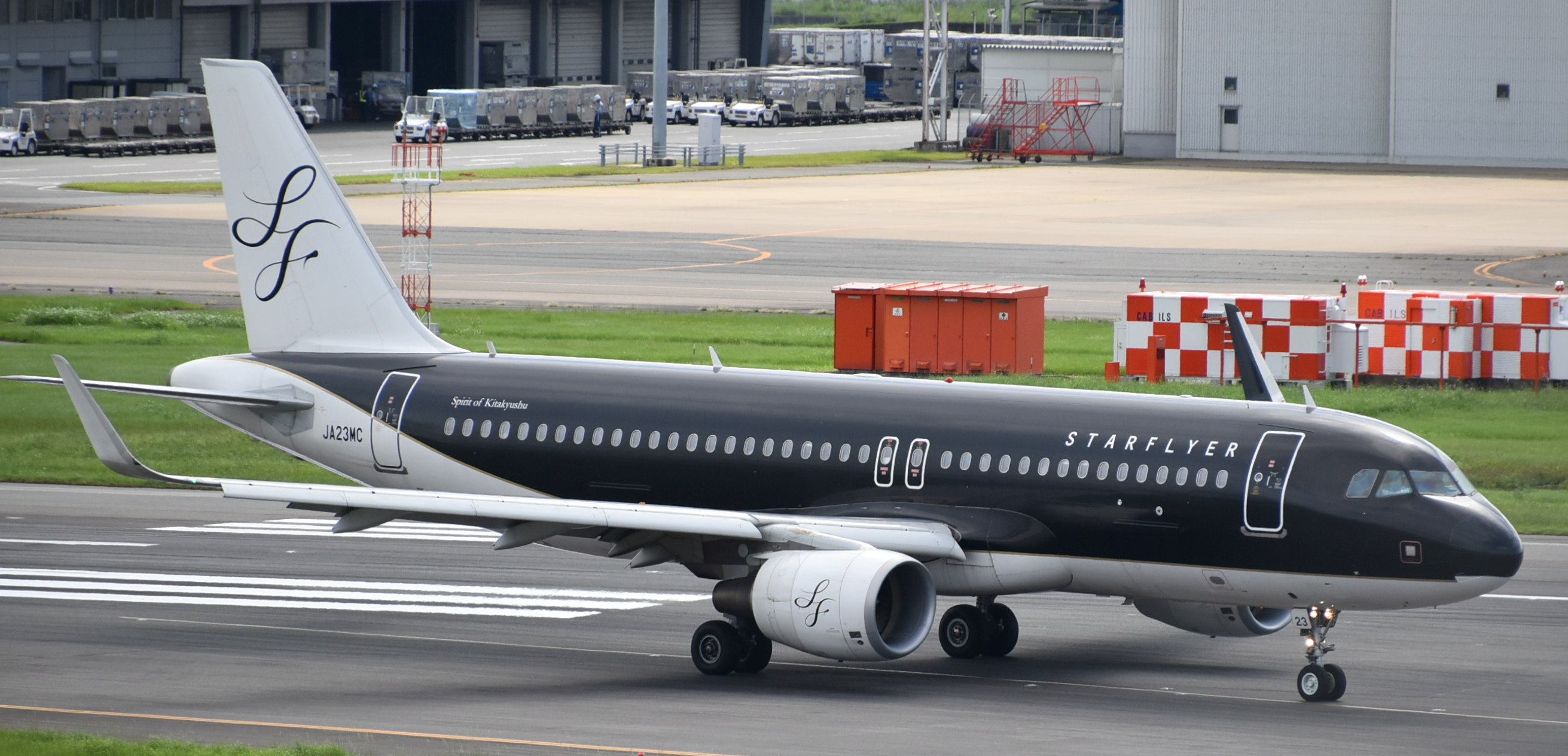
A StarFlyer Airbus A320-200 as seen from the right-hand side, with the tail fin and wingtip colored in white

The company's black and white aircraft livery and corporate branding were designed under the art direction of Tatsuya Matsui, a noted robot designer, in conjunction with SGI Japan. Matsui based the airline's brand identity around the concept of a "Mother Comet" taking passengers through space to their destination. His design work extended to aircraft interiors, airport facilities and in-flight service implements, including the airline's signature leather seats and chocolates.

Additionally, parts of the livery feature inverted color schemes relative to the opposing side of the aircraft. On the aircraft's left-hand side, the vertical stabilizer (tail fin) and wingtip are colored in solid black, with the airline's tail fin logo colored in white. Inversely on the aircraft's right-hand side, the tail fin and wingtip are colored in solid white, with the airline's tail fin logo colored in black.

== Cabin and services ==
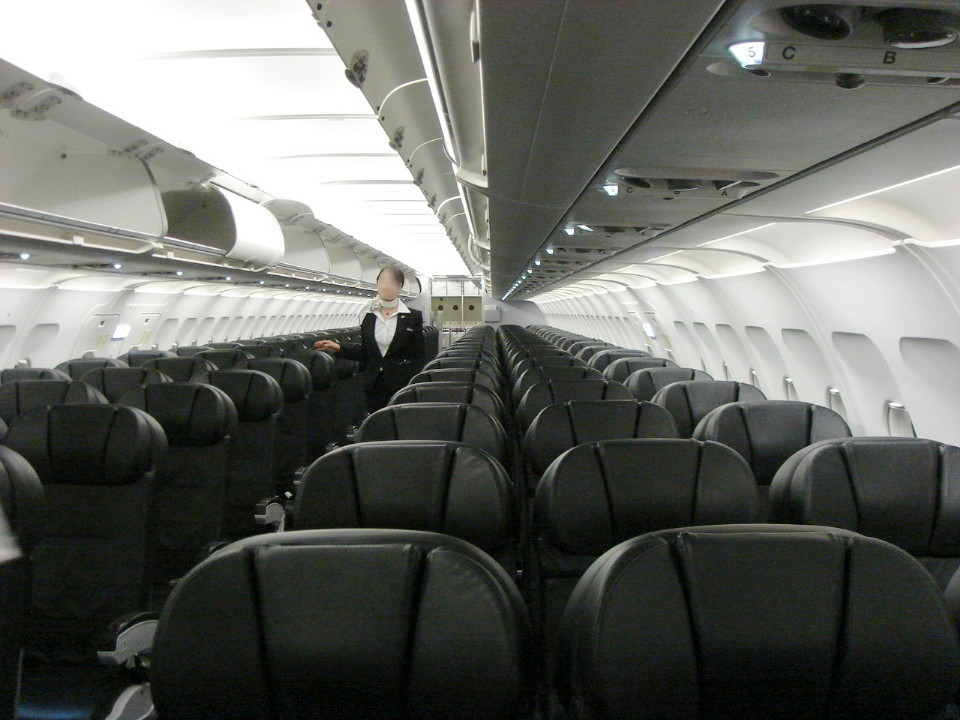
Interior of a StarFlyer Airbus A320-200

StarFlyer's Airbus A320-200 aircraft are equipped with 150 seats in an all-economy class cabin layout, offering 34 inches (86 cm) of pitch, with its Airbus A320neo aircraft configured with 162 seats. On the A320-200, each seat is equipped with a Panasonic Avionics in-flight entertainment touchscreen system, with older aircraft equipped with a screen offering a range of television or audio channels running on a schedule, and newer aircraft equipped with a larger screen offering audio and video on demand (AVOD). Seats are equipped both with USB ports and traditional electrical sockets for charging devices. Entertainment screens are not equipped on the A320neo, which instead incorporates electronic device holders in place of the screens as well as in-flight Wi-Fi access.

On all flights, the airline offers a traditional refreshment cart service consisting of complimentary and surcharged options. On international flights, the airline offers complimentary meal services. StarFlyer also offers a selection of in-flight shopping goods for purchase, rental services for amenities such as blankets and auxiliary device chargers, as well as services for families with small children.

== Frequent-flyer program ==
StarFlyer's frequent-flyer program is Star Link, a distance-based accrual program through which passengers can earn miles based on the route length of StarFlyer flights.
