= Kokura =

Ancient castle town in Fukuoka prefecture, Japan

Coordinates: 33°53′N 130°53′E

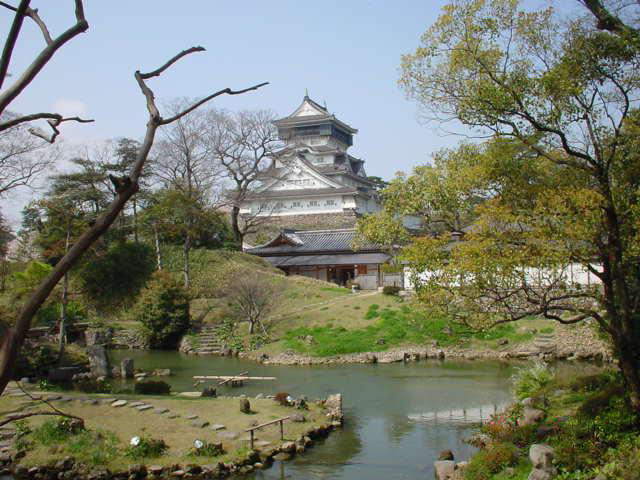
Kokura Castle in central Kokura

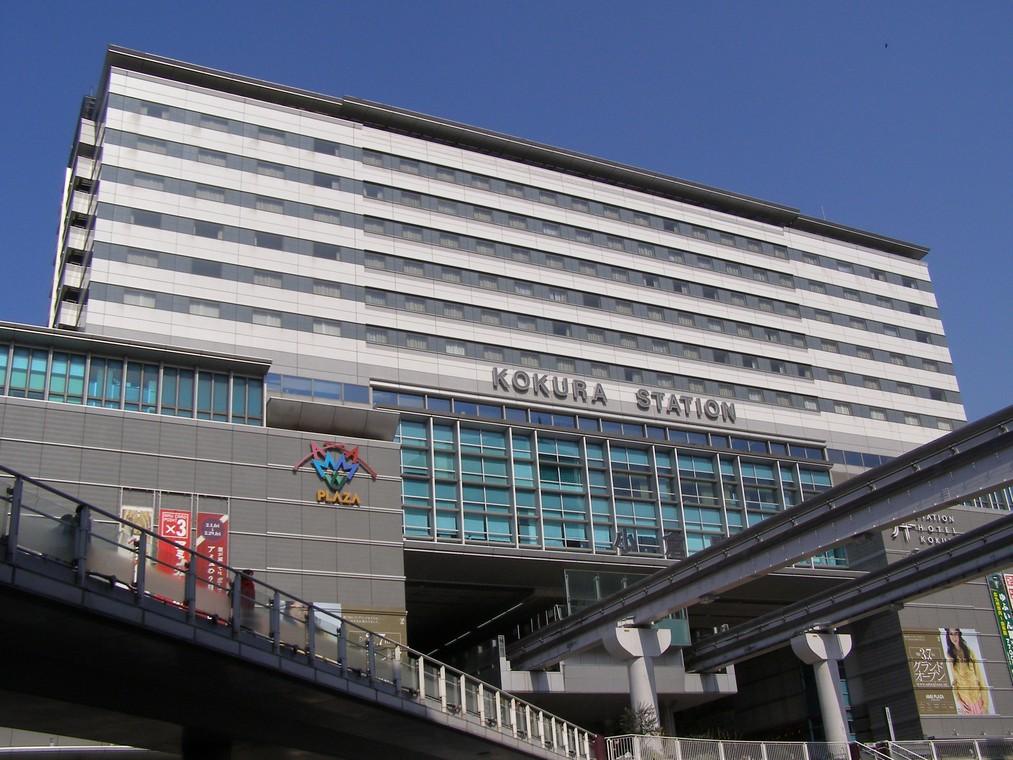
Kokura station

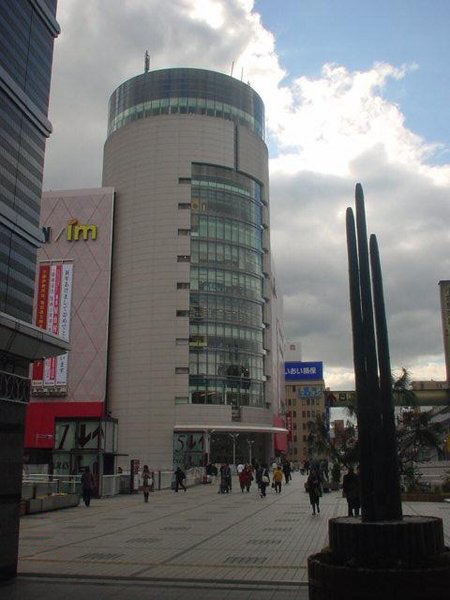
Isetan department store, Kokura

Emblem of Kokura

Kokura (小倉, Kokura) is the central district of Kitakyushu and a former castle town in Fukuoka Prefecture, Japan. The area developed around Kokura Castle, built in 1602. Kokura merged with four neighboring cities in 1963 to form Kitakyushu. Kokura Station is the penultimate westbound stop on the JR West San'yō Shinkansen line.

== History ==
=== Edo period ===
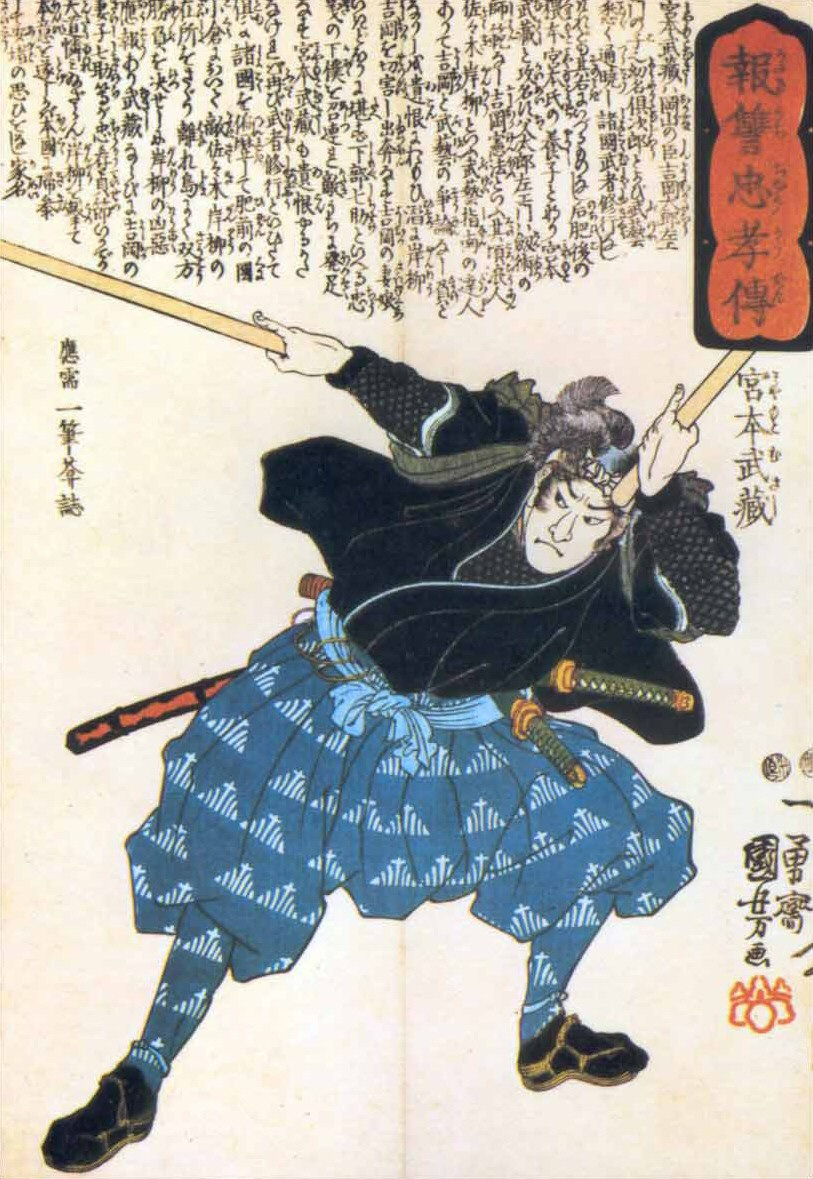
Miyamoto Musashi in his prime, wielding two bokken. Woodblock print by Utagawa Kuniyoshi

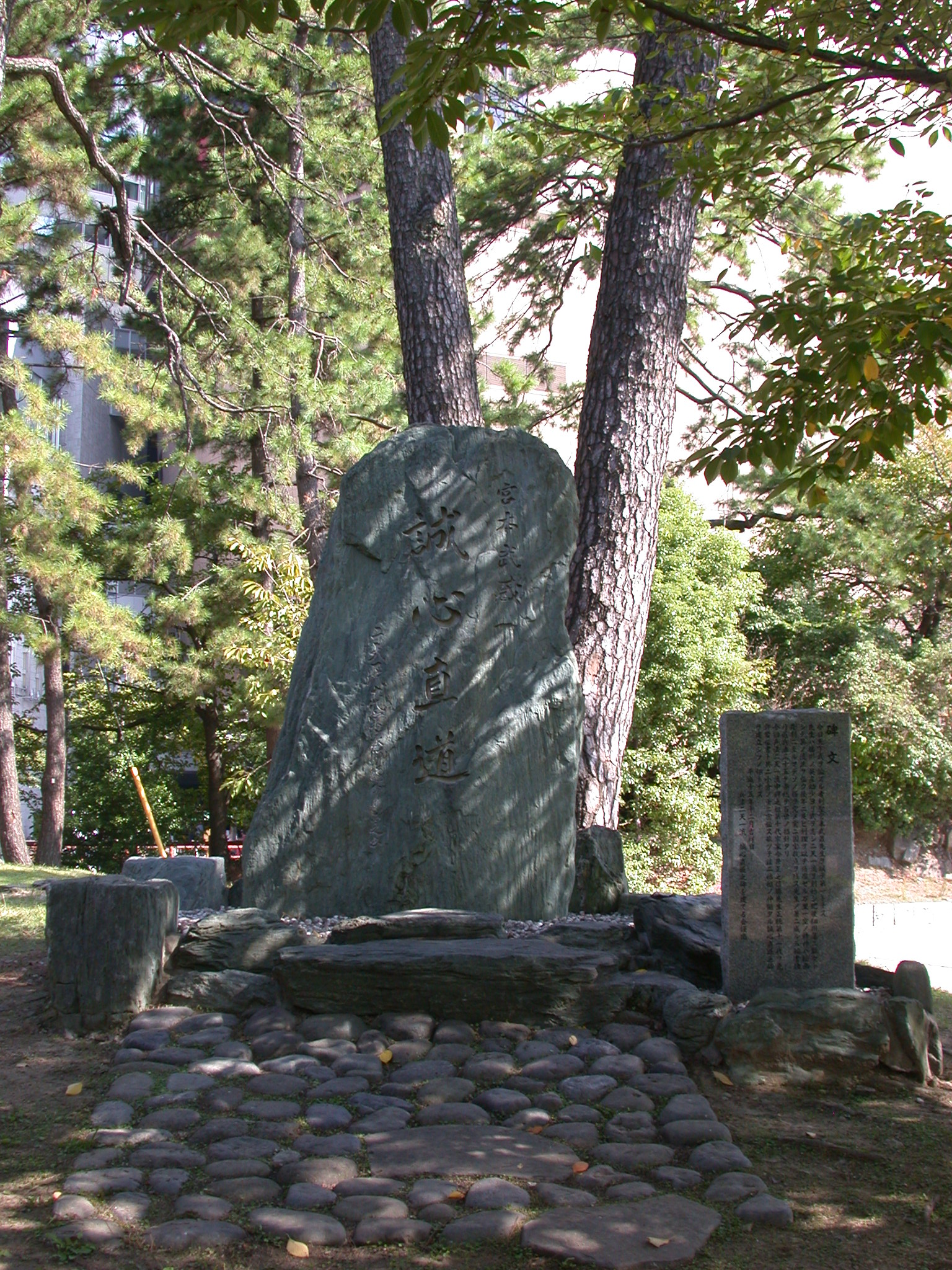
"Seishin Chokudō" (earnest heart, straight way) monument dedicated to Miyamoto Musashi at the foot of Kokura castle on the spot where Musashi is said to have lived.

The Hosokawa and Ogasawara clans were daimyō at Kokura Castle during the Edo period (1603–1868). Tadaoki Hosokawa hoped to create a town in Kokura that resembled Kyoto, including its grid-like layout.

Miyamoto Musashi, samurai swordsman, author of The Book of Five Rings and founder of the Hyoho Niten Ichi-ryū, famous for its use of two swords, lived in the Kokura castle under the patronage of the Ogasawara and Hosokawa clans briefly during 1634.

=== Meiji period ===
After the end of the Tokugawa Shogunate, Kokura was the seat of government for Kokura Prefecture. When the municipal system of cities, towns and villages was introduced, Kokura Town was one of 25 towns in the prefecture, which later merged with Fukuoka Prefecture. Kokura was elevated to city status as "Kokura City" (小倉市, Kokura-shi) in 1900.

=== World War II ===
Kokura was the primary target for the "Fat Man" atomic bomb on August 9, 1945, but on the morning of the raid, the city was obscured by morning fog. Kokura had also been mistaken for the neighboring city of Yahata the day before by the reconnaissance missions. Since the mission commander Major Charles Sweeney had orders to drop the bomb visually and not by radar, he diverted to the secondary target, Nagasaki. The planes, however, did fly over Kokura and were extremely close to executing the mission drop.

=== Post-war ===
Kokura was merged with four other cities to form Kitakyushu in 1963. It constituted the Kokura ward of the new city until 1974, when it was divided into Kokura Kita ward in the north, and Kokura Minami ward in the south.

== Notable residents ==
- Matsumoto Seichō – writer
- Miyamoto Musashi – swordsman and rōnin
- Mori Ōgai – physician, translator, novelist and poet
- Tetsuya Theodore Fujita – Meteorologist, lived in Kokura during World War II
- Leiji Matsumoto, mangaka

== Notable figures born in Kokura ==
- Tsukasa Hojo, mangaka
- Masumi Mitsui, 10th Battalion, CEF.
- Linda Yamamoto, singer and J-pop idol
- Satoru Nomura, yakuza godfather, leader of the Kudo-kai

== Festivals ==
The Gion Festival of Kokura is called the "Gion of Drums" and celebrates the life of local folk-hero Muhomatsu.

== Notable facts ==
The city is the site of the main dojo (honbu) of Miyamoto Musashi's sword school, Hyoho Niten Ichi-ryū.

== See also ==
- Kokura Kita-ku
- Kokura Minami-ku
- Kokura Prefecture
- Atomic bombings of Hiroshima and Nagasaki
