= Kokura Prefecture =

Locality in Japan (1871–1876)

小倉県
- Former Prefecture of Japan
- 1871–1876
- Capital: Kitakyushu (regional center)
- History
  - Established: 14 November 1871
  - Disestablished: 18 April 1876
- Political subdivisions: List: Kitakyushu; Tagawa, Fukuoka; Kanda, Fukuoka; Miyako, Fukuoka; Buzen, Fukuoka; Chikujō, Fukuoka; Kōge, Fukuoka; Yoshitomi, Fukuoka; Nakatsu, Ōita; Usa, Ōita
- Today part of: Fukuoka Prefecture; Ōita Prefecture

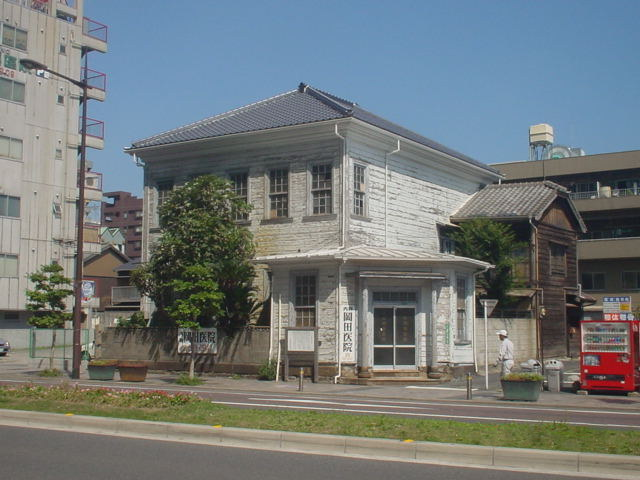
Kokura prefectural office (September 2005), Kokura Kita ward, Kitakyushu

The Kokura Prefecture (小倉県, Kokura-ken) of Japan was a short-lived locality founded in December 1871 after the clan system was abolished earlier that year. It was made up of three separate han territories (Chizuka, Kokura and Nakatsu) which were, each for a short while in 1871 themselves, called 'prefectures'.

Kokura Prefecture included Moji, Kokura and other areas to the south. It incorporated the Nakatsu Province (Japanese: 中津県, est. 1871), formerly the Nakatsu Domain, the Toyotsu Province (Japanese: 豊津県, formerly Kawara Domain, Japanese: 香春藩, later renamed Toyotsu Domain, Japanese: 豊津県), parts of Hita Province (Japanese: 日田県) and Chizuka Province (Japanese: 千束県, formerly Chizuka Domain, renamed from Kokura Shinden Domain, Japanese: 小倉新田藩). Kokura Prefecture occupied most of the Buzen Province; in 1876 it was absorbed by Fukuoka Prefecture. The city of Kokura was founded in 1900.

== Kokura prefectural office (kencho) ==
The old wooden-built Kokura prefectural office (小倉県庁) is still standing in Kokura Kita ward, Kitakyushu though in a dilapidated condition. Used as a medical clinic and previously as a law court and a police station, it is opposite the ultra-modern Riverwalk Kitakyushu and is in stark contrast to it.

== See also ==
- Prefectures of Japan
