= Kitakyushu Airport =

Airport in Kitakyushu, Fukuoka Prefecture, Japan

Kitakyushu Airport 北九州空港
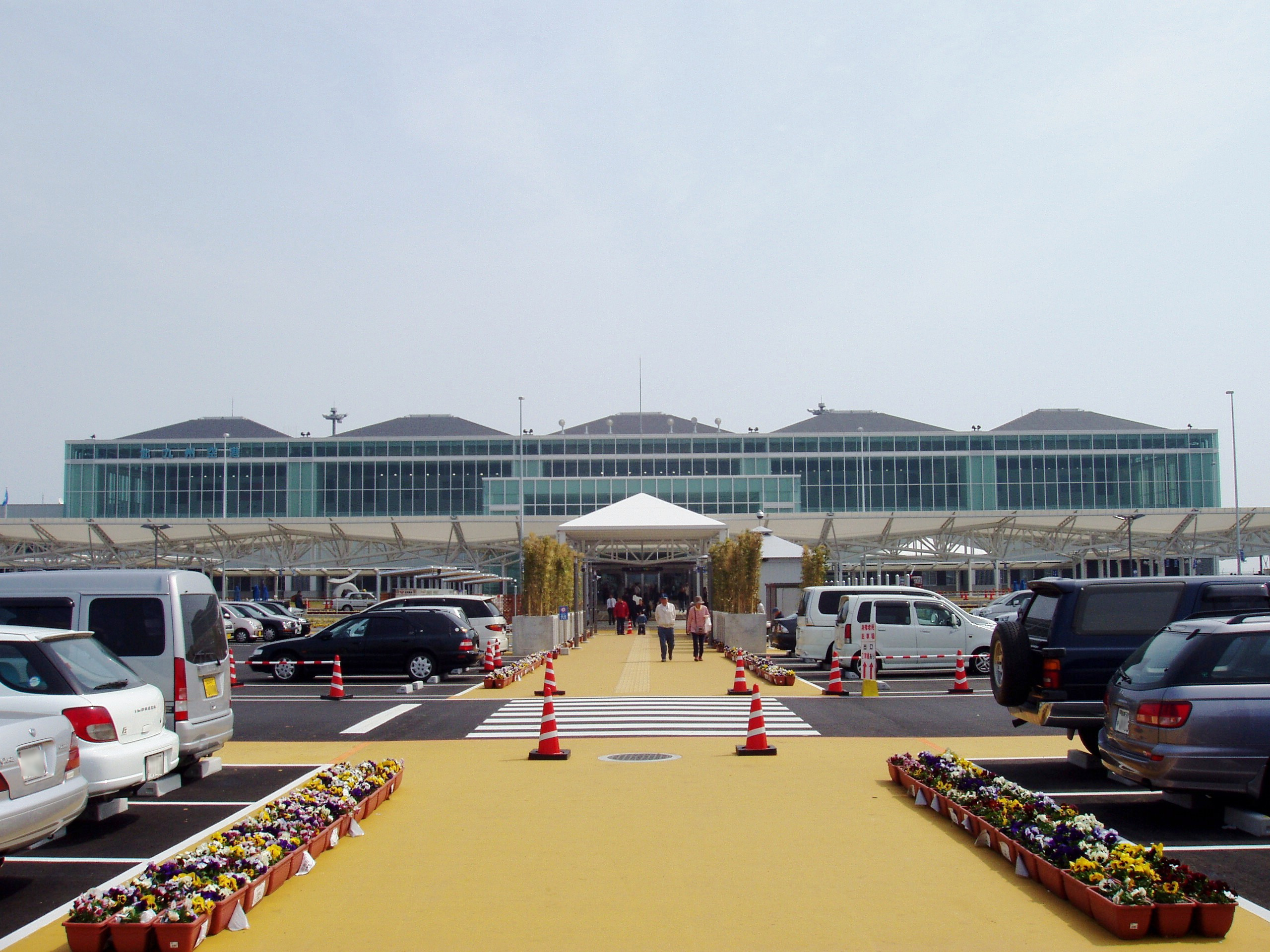
- IATA: KKJ; ICAO: RJFR

Summary
- Airport type: Public
- Operator: Ministry of Transport (airfield); Kitakyushu Air Terminal Co. (terminal)
- Serves: Fukuoka–Kitakyushu
- Location: Kokuraminami-ku, Kitakyushu, Fukuoka Prefecture, Japan
- Opened: March 16, 2006; 20 years ago
- Operating base for: StarFlyer
- Elevation AMSL: 21 ft (6.4 m)
- Coordinates: 33°50′44″N 131°02′06″E

Map
- Location in Kitakyushu Location in Fukuoka Prefecture Location in Japan

Runways
Direction	Length		Surface
Direction	m	ft	Surface
18/36	2,500	8,202	Asphalt/Concrete

Statistics (2015)
- Passengers: 1,317,504
- Cargo (metric tonnes): 7,922
- Aircraft movement: 17,461
- Source: Japanese Ministry of Land, Infrastructure, Transport and Tourism

Kitakyushu Airport (Japanese: 北九州空港, Hepburn: Kitakyūshū-kūkō) (IATA: KKJ, ICAO: RJFR), sometimes called Kokuraminami Airport, is an airport in Kokuraminami-ku, Kitakyushu, Fukuoka Prefecture, Japan. It is built on an artificial island in the western Seto Inland Sea, 3 km (1.9 mi) away from the city's downtown. It opened on 16 March 2006, as New Kitakyushu Airport (新北九州空港, Shin-kitakyūshū-kūkō) but was renamed in 2008. It has some international charter flights.

It is one of the six airports in Japan to operate 24 hours a day, alongside Haneda Airport (Tokyo), Naha Airport (Naha), New Chitose Airport (Sapporo), Kansai International Airport (Osaka), and Chubu Centrair International Airport (Nagoya).

== History ==
The former airport also known as Kokura Airport had restrictions on aircraft operation due to its small size and location, close to mountains and residential areas. Heavy fog often resulted in flight cancellations. There were similar problems at the nearby Fukuoka Airport, which cannot operate 24 hours due to proximity to residential areas.

A new airport was intended to be free from such problems due to its offshore location, making possible 24-hour operation unlike these 2 airports. Large cargo planes can use the airport, making possible convenient freight movement to and from nearby industrial zones. Toyota has a factory just across the bay from the airport.

=== Construction ===
A committee to promote the construction of the new airport was founded in 1978, with the governor of Fukuoka as chairman. Construction began in October 1994.

The new airport was anticipated by residents in and around the cities of Kitakyushu and Shimonoseki. The Kitakyushu municipal government organized bus tours to the construction site for interested citizens in an attempt to defuse controversy over the construction. The airport officially opened on March 16, 2006.

=== Flights ===
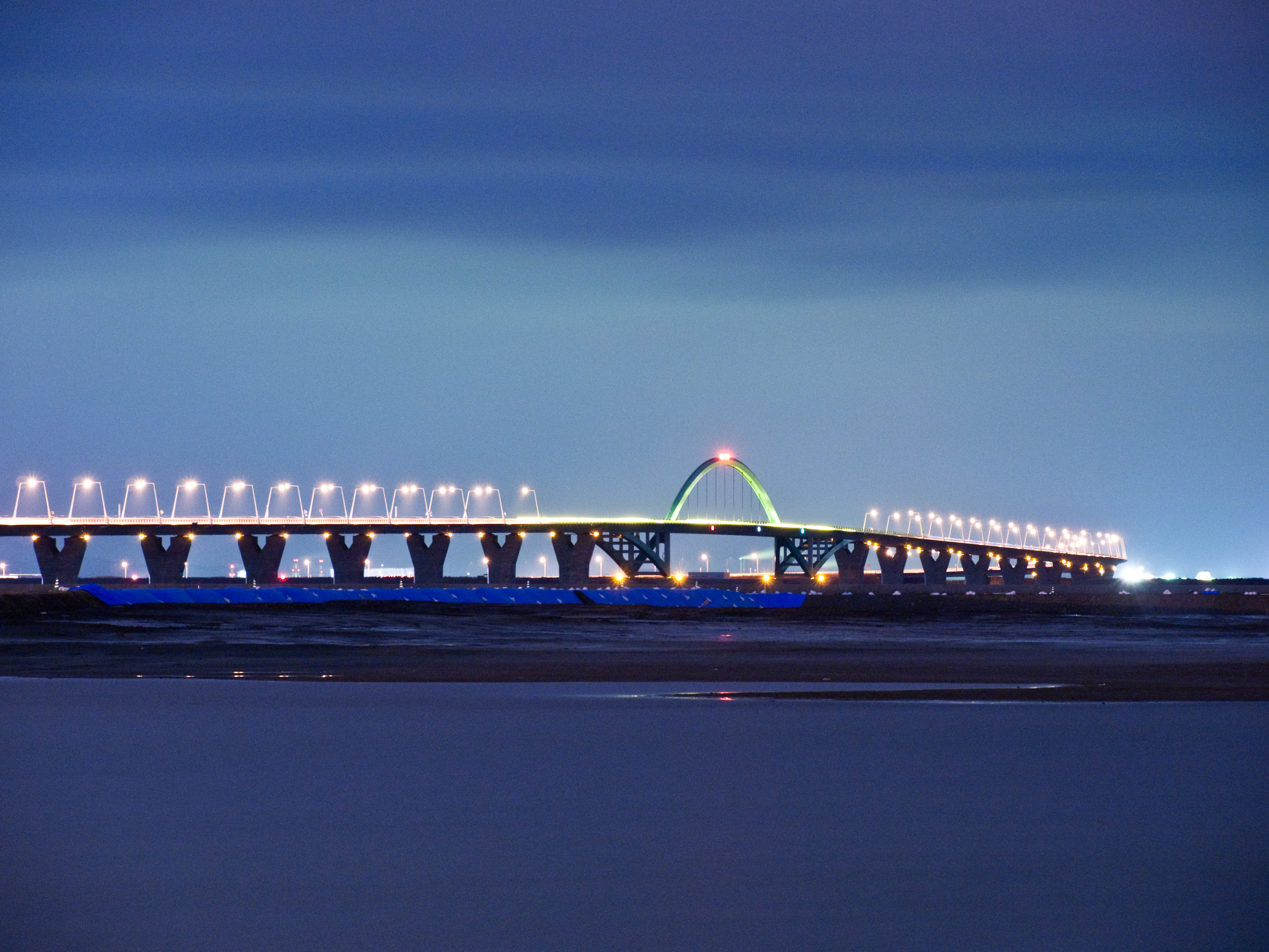
Bridge to Kitakyushu Airport

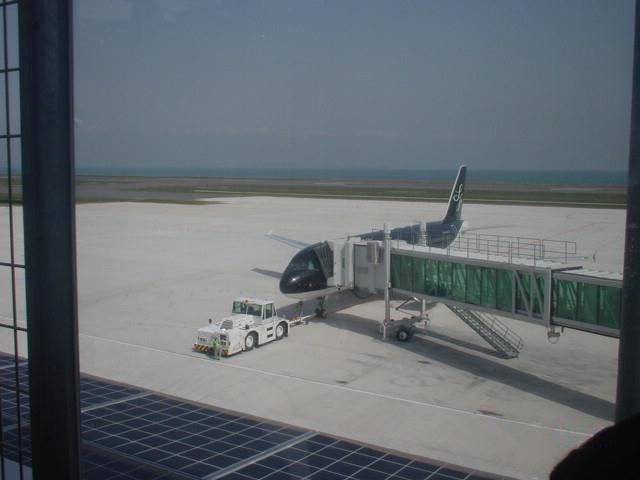
StarFlyer Airbus A320-200 at the airport

The first aircraft to land at the airport was a StarFlyer Airbus on March 16, 2006. The first international flight from Shanghai landed on March 30, 2006. A Korean low-cost carrier, Jeju Air, flew eight charter flights from Kitakyushu to Incheon International Airport in summer 2008. Scheduled service on the route started in March 2009.

== Dimensions ==
The runway is 2,500 by 60 m (8,202 by 197 ft) (with a separate taxiway of 2,500 by 30 m (8,202 by 98 ft)), enough to accommodate Boeing 747s and other large jet aircraft. The manmade island on which the airport is built is 4,125 m (13,533 ft) long and 900 m (2,953 ft) wide (3.73 km^{2} (1.44 sq mi)). Due to the island's size and the relative shallowness of the surrounding water, which is about 7 m (23 ft) in depth, the expansion is being conducted, starting with a 500 m (1,600 ft) runway extension to 3,000 by 30 m (9,843 by 98 ft)). Construction to extend the runway to 3,000 metres (9,800 ft) began in December 2023. Completion is scheduled for August 2027.

== Airlines and destinations ==
=== Passenger ===
Airlines	Destinations
Aero K	Cheongju
Japan Airlines	Tokyo–Haneda
Jin Air	Seoul–Incheon
StarFlyer	Taipei–Taoyuan, Tokyo–Haneda

=== Cargo ===
Cargo flights of Yamato Transport are operated by Spring Japan.

Airlines	Destinations
Korean Air Cargo	Los Angeles, Seoul–Incheon
Yamato Transport; Operated by Spring Japan	Naha, Tokyo–Narita

== Other facilities ==
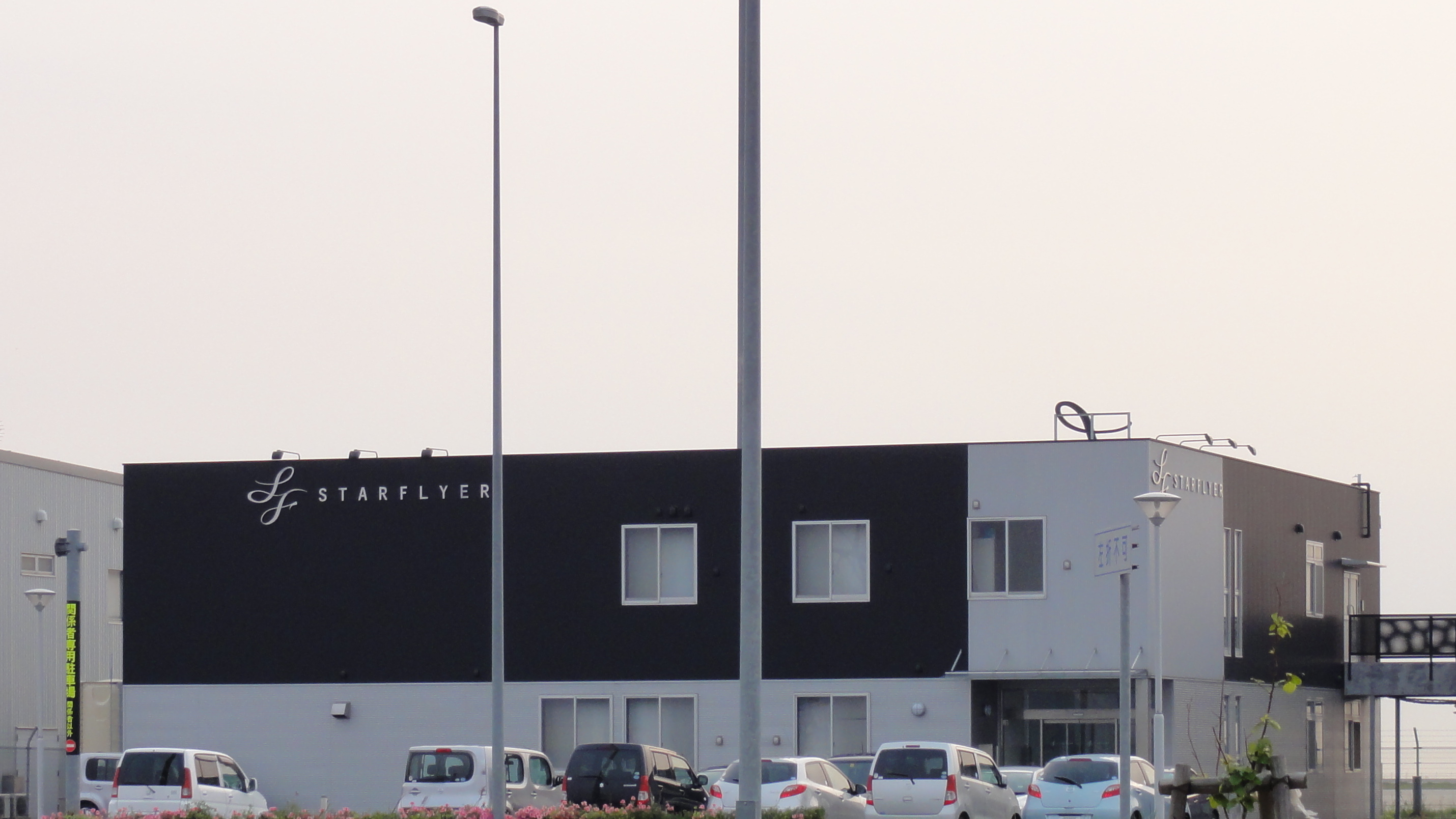
StarFlyer headquarters

The airline StarFlyer has its head office on the airport property.

== Access ==
=== Road ===
A 2.1 km toll-free bridge connects the island to the Higashikyūshū Expressway via the Kanda-Kitakyushukūkō interchange.

=== Bus ===
Terminal	Via	Note	Operator
Sunatsu	Kokura Station Bus Center		Nishitetsu
Kitakyushu Science and Research Park	Orio, Kurosaki		Nishitetsu
Kusami Station		Runs on automated driving	Nishitetsu
Hakata Station	Tenjin	only at midnight and early morning	Nishitetsu
