= Kokura Castle =

Castle in Kitakyushu, Japan

Coordinates: 33°53′04″N 130°52′27″E

Kokura Castle 小倉城
- Kitakyushu, Fukuoka Prefecture, Japan
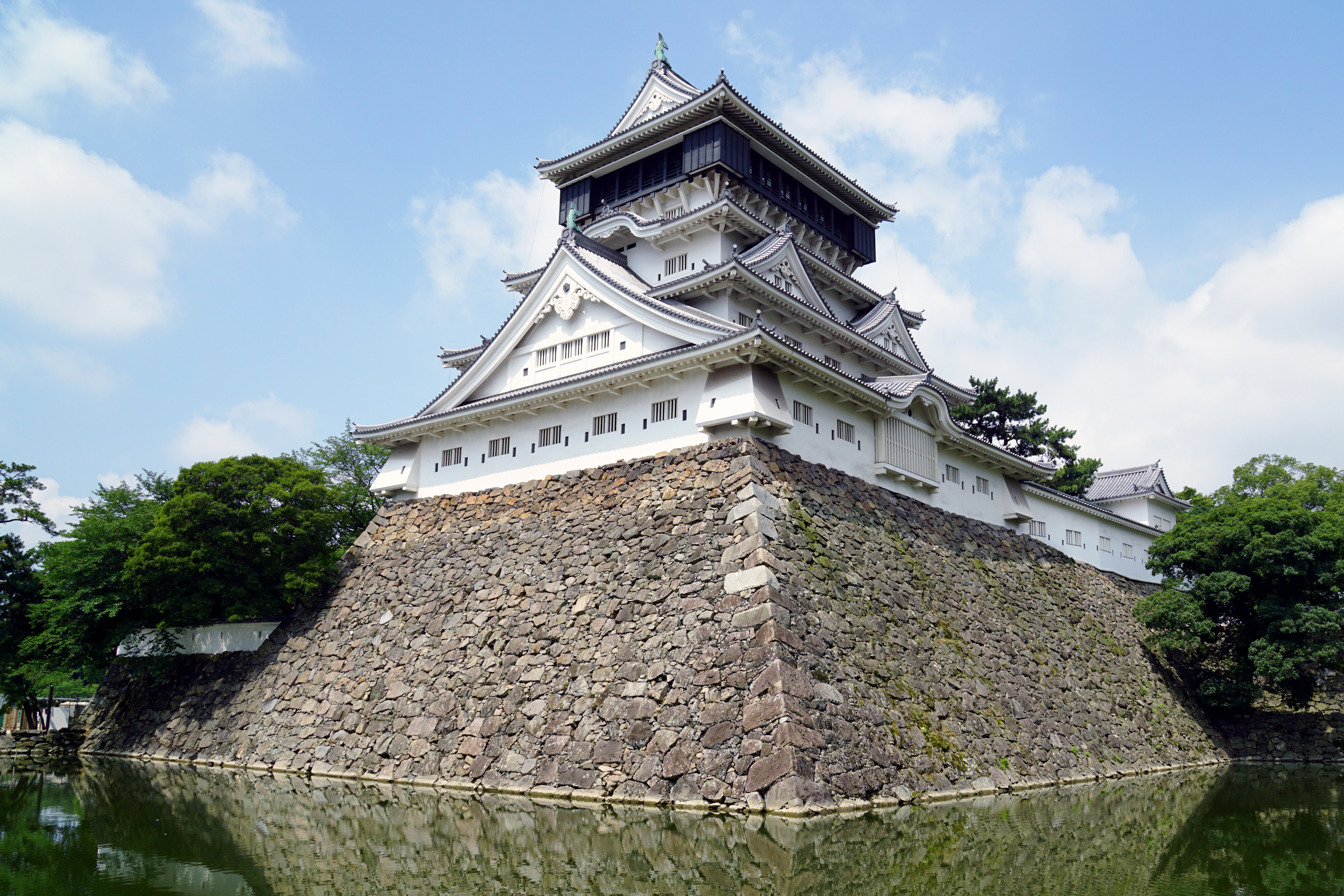
- Kokura Castle keep

Site information
- Open to the public: yes

Location
- Location within Kitakyushu Location within Fukuoka Prefecture Location within Japan

Site history
- Built: 1608, rebuilt 1839, 1959

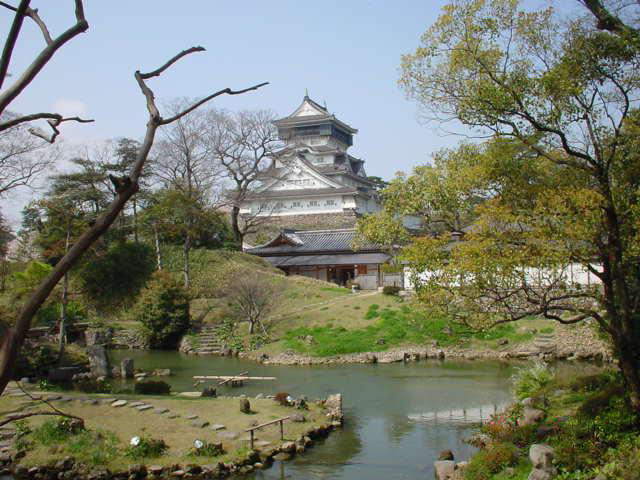
Kokura Castle from the nearby Japanese garden

Kokura Castle (Japanese: 小倉城, Hepburn: Kokura-jō) is a five-story castle in Kitakyushu, Japan. A castle was first built at the current site in 1569. Construction of a more substantial replacement commenced in 1602 under the direction of daimyo Tadaoki Hosokawa. As of 2021, Kokura Castle had the 6th tallest castle keep among existing Japanese castles.

== History ==
The history of Kokura Castle dates back to 1569, when the Mōri clan built a castle at the current site. In 1602, following his participation in the Battle of Sekigahara, daimyo Tadaoki Hosokawa ordered the construction of a more substantial castle. Construction was completed in about seven years, and incorporated an entire castle town within its fortifications. The castle walls, which remain today in their original state, were assembled using the “rough stone stacking” method known as Nozura-zumi (野面積み). At the time, it was the fifth-largest castle in Japan.

After the Hosokawa clan relocated to Kumamoto, daimyo Tadazane Ogasawara took control of Kokura in 1632. The castle remained the property of the Ogasawara clan (from Harima) from1632 to the 1860s. The castle burnt down from a fire in 1837, with portions of it (but not the keep) rebuilt in 1839.

Kokura Castle was burnt down intentionally on August 1, 1866 by retreating Kokura troops during a battle fought against the Chōshū clan during the Second Chōshū expedition. The Kokura troops managed to storm the remnants of the castle on September 9, 1866 and retrieved some documents and goods that had been left during the earlier retreat. However, the castle's symbolically significant drum had been seized by the Chōshū domain, and it was eventually taken to Itsukushima Shrine in Shimonoseki where it still resides.

The keep was reconstructed in 1959, and the castle was fully restored in 1990. Matsumoto Seicho Memorial Museum and castle garden were opened in 1998.

== Location ==
The castle is about a ten-minute walk from JR Kyushu's Kokura Station. The north side of the moat is next to the Riverwalk shopping complex (completed in 2003).

== Attractions ==
The castle keep contains a modern folkloric museum and admission is charged to the keep, garden and Matsumoto Seicho Memorial Museum.

The keep is not a fully accurate reconstruction. In particular, when it was reconstructed in 1959, the designers chose to use gables that did not exist when the keep had originally been constructed.

Kokura Castle was listed as one of the Continued Top 100 Japanese Castles in 2017.

An old Japanese-style pre-Brunton lighthouse replica (of the original Shirasu Lighthouse (白州灯台)) is on the castle grounds.

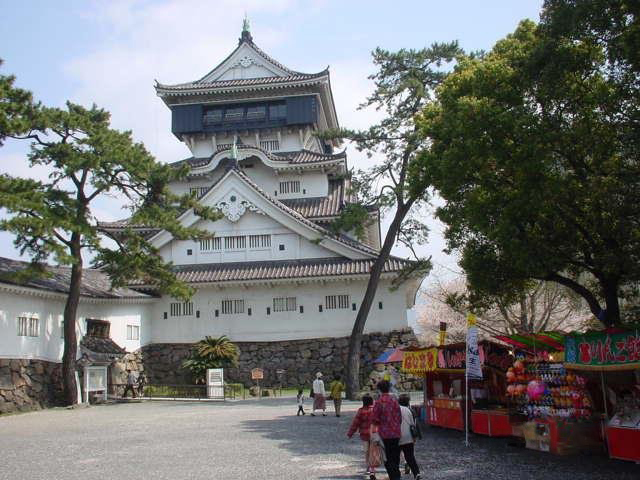
The keep or donjon of Kokura Castle

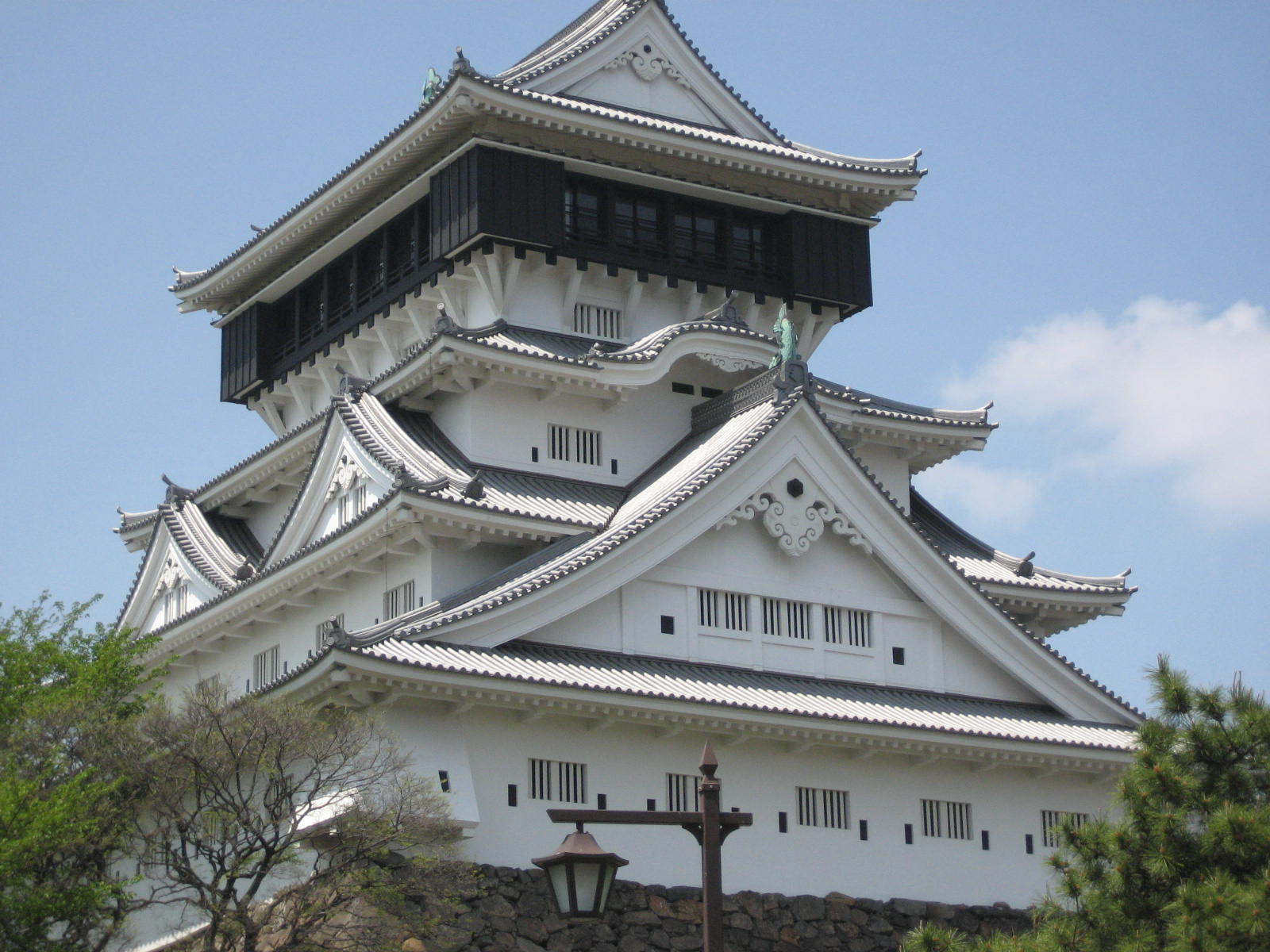
Closer look at east side of the castle

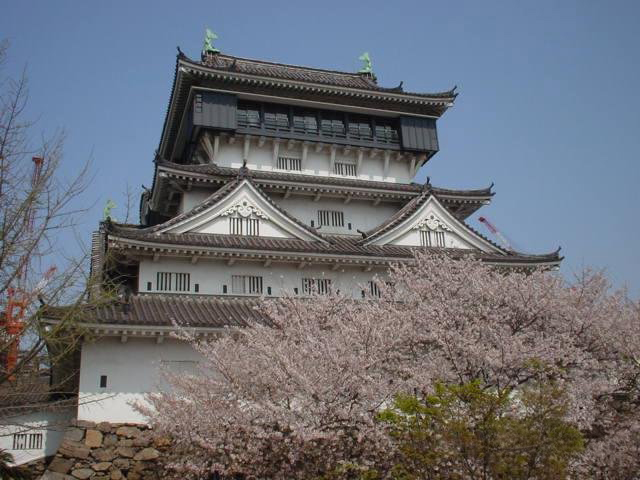
Cherry blossoms (sakura) and the keep of Kokura Castle, March 2002

Kokura castle

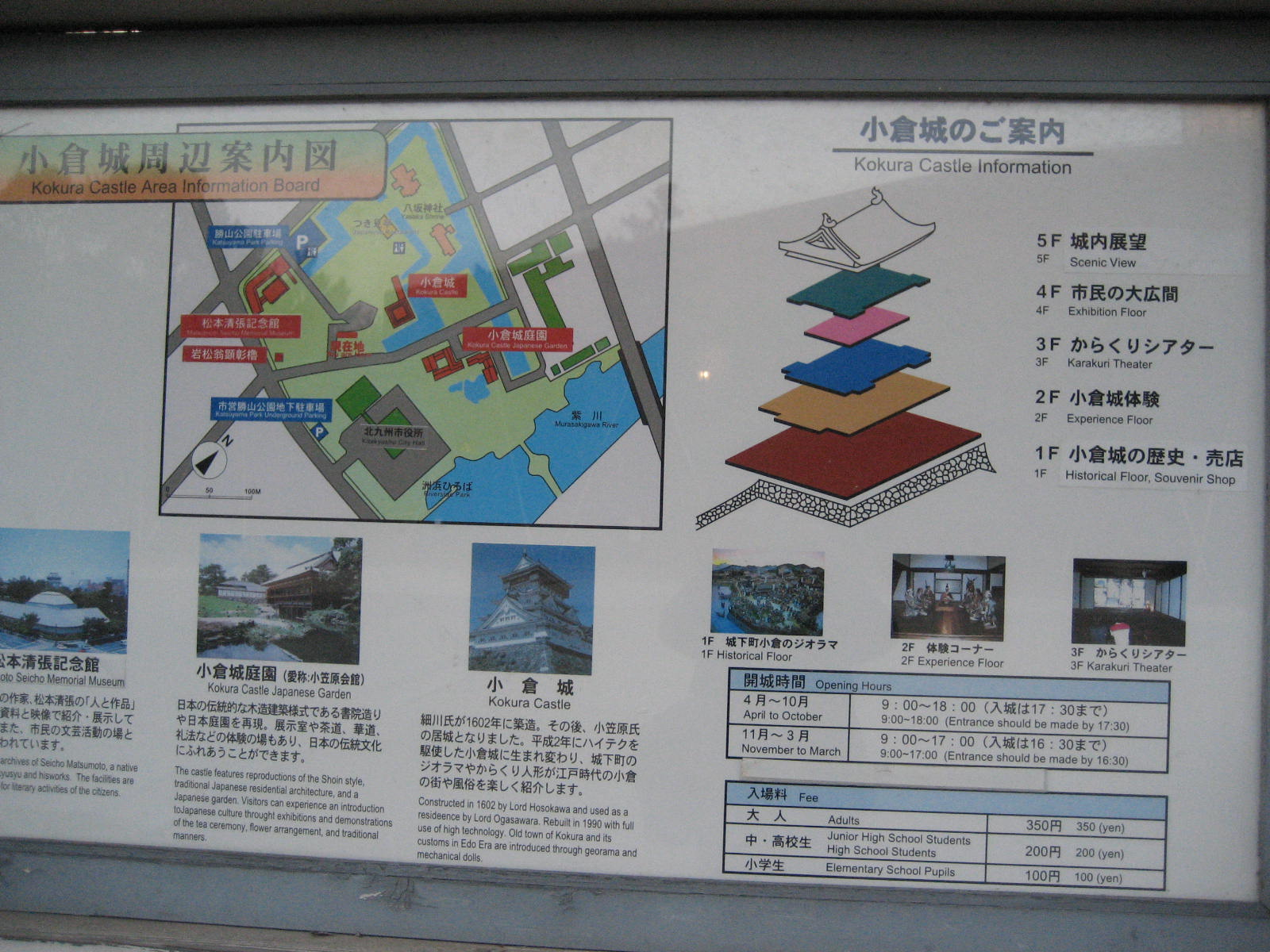
Kokura Castle floors information

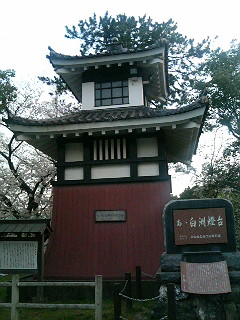
The old Shirasu lighthouse

== Literature ==
- Benesch, Oleg and Ran Zwigenberg (2019). Japan's Castles: Citadels of Modernity in War and Peace. Cambridge: Cambridge University Press. p. 374. ISBN 9781108481946.
- De Lange, William (2021). An Encyclopedia of Japanese Castles. Groningen: Toyo Press. pp. 600 pages. ISBN 978-9492722300.
- Schmorleitz, Morton S. (1974). Castles in Japan. Tokyo: Charles E. Tuttle Co. ISBN 0-8048-1102-4.

== See also ==
- Furuichi Ryōwa
