= Underwater tunnel =

Tunnel which passes under sea

An underwater tunnel is a tunnel which is partly or wholly constructed under the sea or a river. They are often used where building a bridge or operating a ferry link is unviable, or to provide competition or relief for existing bridges or ferry links. While short tunnels are often road tunnels which may admit motorized traffic, unmotorized traffic or both, concerns with ventilation lead to the longest tunnels (such as the Channel Tunnel or the Seikan Tunnel) being electrified rail tunnels.

== Types of tunnel ==
Various methods are used to construct underwater tunnels, including an immersed tube and a submerged floating tunnel. The immersed tube method involves steel tube segments that are positioned in a trench in the sea floor and joined together. The trench is then covered and the water pumped from the tunnel. Submerged floating tunnels use the law of buoyancy to remain submerged, with the tunnel attached to the sea bed by columns or tethers, or hung from pontoons on the surface.

== Advantages ==
=== Compared with bridges ===
One such advantage would be that a tunnel would still allow shipping to pass. A low bridge would need an opening or swing bridge to allow shipping to pass, which can cause traffic congestion. Conversely, a higher bridge that does allow shipping may be unsightly and opposed by the public, and should it collapse, it may block shipping. Higher bridges can also be more expensive than lower ones. Bridges can also be closed due to harsh weather such as high winds.

Tunneling makes excavated soil available that can be used to create new land (see land reclamation). This was done with the rock excavated for the Channel Tunnel, which was used to create Samphire Hoe.

=== Compared with ferry links ===
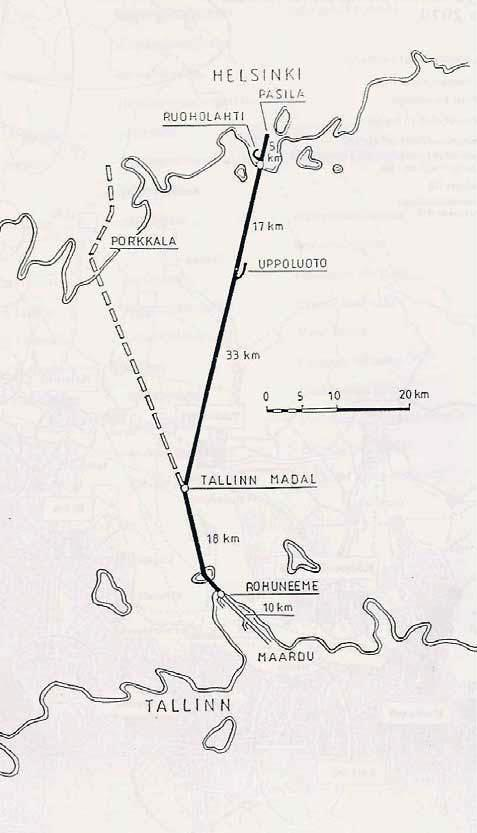
A map of assessed Helsinki–Tallinn Tunnel through the Gulf of Finland as part of the Rail Baltica project

As with bridges, albeit with more chance, ferry links may be closed by adverse weather (strong winds) or tides. Travelling through a tunnel is significantly quicker than travelling using a ferry link, as shown by the times for travelling through the Channel Tunnel (75–90 minutes for ferry and 21 minutes on the Eurostar). Ferries also usually use fossil fuels emitting greenhouse gases while most railway tunnels are electrified. In the Baltic Sea, one of the busiest areas for passenger ferries in the world, sea ice is a problem, causing seasonal disruption or requiring expensive ice-breaking ships. In the Øresund region the construction of the bridge-tunnel has been cited as enhancing regional integration and giving an economic boom not possible with the previous ferry links. Similar arguments are used by proponents of the Helsinki-Tallinn tunnel in the Talsinki region. There are various issues with the safety of both tunnels and ferries, in the case of tunnels, fire is a particular hazard with several fires having broken out in the Channel Tunnel. On the other hand, the free surface effect is a significant safety risk for RORO ferries as seen in the sinking of MS Estonia. Tunnels which exclude dangerous, combustible freights and the fuel or lithium-ion batteries carried aboard motorcars can significantly reduce fire risk.

== Disadvantages ==
=== Compared with bridges ===
Tunnels can require higher costs of security and construction than bridges, but this depends on the clearance needed for ships and the water depth. This may mean that over short distances bridges may be preferred rather than tunnels (for example Dartford Crossing).

=== Compared with ferry links ===
As with bridges, ferry links are far cheaper to construct than tunnels, but not to operate. Also tunnels don't have the flexibility to be deployed over different routes as transport demand changes over time. Without the cost of a new ferry, the route over which a ferry provides transport can easily be changed. However, this flexibility can be a downside for customers who have come to rely on the ferry service only to see it abandoned. Fixed infrastructure such as bridges or tunnels represent a much more concrete commitment to sustained service.

== List of notable examples ==
Name	Place	Description	Length	Depth (from surface)	Constructed in
Thames Tunnel	London, England	Thought to be the oldest tunnel under a navigable river, crossing the Thames in London	0.4 km		1825–1843
Mersey Railway Tunnel	Liverpool, England	The oldest underwater rail tunnel in the world, crossing the Mersey in Liverpool	1.21 km		1881–1886
Severn Tunnel	Wales – England	One of the oldest underwater rail tunnels in the world	7.01 km		1873–1886
Ravenswood Tunnel	New York, USA	The first underwater tunnel to encounter a mixed working face during construction, which also used the highest recorded pressure that workers had experienced in tunneling.	0.767 km		1892–1894
Blackwall Tunnel (western)	London, England	The oldest underwater vehicular tunnel in the world, crossing the Thames in London	1.35 km		1892–1897
Elbe Tunnel (1911)	Hamburg, Germany	Pioneering underwater pedestrian and vehicular tunnel, crossing the Elbe River in Hamburg	0.426 km	24 m	1907–1911
Holland Tunnel	New York – New Jersey, USA	The longest continuous underwater vehicular tunnel in the world when first built, crossing the Hudson River between Manhattan and Jersey City	2.6 km	28.3 m	1920–1927
Detroit–Windsor Tunnel	Windsor, Canada – Detroit, USA	Connect Ontario, Canada to Michigan, USA. under the Detroit River opened on November 3, 1930	1.57 km	13.7 m	1928–1930
CESC Tunnel	Kolkata, India	It is the first underwater tunnel of Asia, as well as India. The construction of this tunnel was completed in 1931. This tunnel is used for electric power transmission between Kolkata and Howrah.	0.539 km	33.5 m	1931
Tongyeong Undersea Tunnel	Tongyeong, South Korea	The first undersea tunnel in Asia, connecting Tongyeong to the Mireukdo island	0.483 km	13.5 m	1932
Queensway Tunnel	Liverpool, England	The longest vehicular tunnel of any type in the world when first built, crossing the Mersey estuary between Liverpool and Birkenhead	3.24 km		1925–1934
Bankhead Tunnel	Mobile, Alabama	Carries Hwy. 90 in Mobile, AL. Business District, to Blakely Island. The eastern end has large "flood door" that can be closed to prevent water from the Mobile Bay from flooding the tunnel during hurricanes or tropical storms. Two lanes that only allows cars and pick up trucks now to travel through the tunnel	1.033 km	12.2 m	1938–1942
Kanmon Railway Tunnel	Kanmon Straits, Japan	The first undersea tunnel in Japan, connecting the islands of Honshu and Kyushu. One of three tunnels underneath the Kanmon Straits	3.604 km		1936–1942
Lincoln Tunnel	New York, USA	Set of road tunnels built in three stages, crossing the Hudson River between Manhattan and New Jersey	2.4 km average	30 m	1934–1957
Kanmon Roadway Tunnel	Kanmon Straits, Japan	The second of three tunnels under the Kanmon Straits, connecting the islands of Honshu and Kyushu. It was the world's longest undersea road tunnel at the time of its construction and includes a tunnel for pedestrians and cyclists	3.461 km	58 m	1937–1958
Havana Tunnel	Havana, Cuba	Road tunnel built during the Batista era, crossing the Havana Bay	0.733 km	12 m	1957–1958
George Massey Tunnel	Vancouver, Canada	The first tunnel in British Columbia to use Immersed Tube technology	0.629 km	23 m	1957–1959
Muskö Tunnel	Muskö, Sweden	Connecting Muskö island to mainland in Stockholm coastal region	2.9 km	65 m	1959–1964
Sandoyartunnilin	Sandoy, Faroe Islands	Connecting Sandoy to the main island Eysturoy	10.8 km	155 m	2018–2023
Chesapeake Bay Bridge Tunnel	Virginia, USA	Connects Virginia Beach with the Eastern Shore of Virginia. Length refers to the tunnel section	1.6 km		1960–1964
Transbay Tube	San Francisco – Oakland, USA	Rail tunnel for Bay Area Rapid Transit. Connects Oakland to San Francisco. It is the longest underwater tunnel in North America	5.8 km	41 m	1965–1969
Cross-Harbour Tunnel	Hong Kong	A busy road tunnel in Hong Kong	1.86 km		1969–1972
Elbe Tunnel (1975)	Hamburg, Germany	8-lane road tunnel crossing the Elbe River in Hamburg	3.3 km		1968–1975
Ahmed Hamdi Tunnel	Suez, Egypt	Passes under Suez Canal connecting the Asian Sinai Peninsula to the town of Suez on the African mainland 7 tunnels (2 rail, 4 road, 1 other) under New Suez Canal	1.63 km		1979–1981
Vardø Tunnel	Vardø, Norway	Connecting the small island community of Vardø in northern Norway to the mainland	2.9 km	88 m	1979–1982
Kanonersky Tunnel	Saint-Petersburg, Russia	Connects Kanonersky Island to the Kirovsky District of Saint-Petersburg through Neva Bay	0.927 km		1975–1983
Seikan Tunnel	Seikan, Japan	The Seikan Tunnel is the world's longest tunnel with an undersea segment	53.8 km	240 m	1971–1988
Flekkerøy Tunnel	Flekkerøy, Norway	Connecting the island community of Flekkerøy in southern Norway to the mainland	2.3 km	101 m	1986–1989
Sydney Harbour Tunnel	Sydney, Australia		2.8 km		1988–1992
Byfjord Tunnel	Stavanger – Randaberg, Norway	Deepest road tunnel in the world at the time of construction	5.9 km	223 m	1990–1992
Channel Tunnel	England – France	The world's longest undersea portion railway tunnel (37.9 km underwater length)	50.4 km	115 m	1988–1994
Hitra Tunnel	Trøndelag, Norway	The deepest in the world at the time of construction	5.6 km	264 m	1992–1994
Tokyo Bay Aqua-Line	Tokyo, Japan	The world's 2nd longest undersea portion road tunnel	9.6 km		1988–1997
Massachusetts Bay Outfall	Boston, USA	The outfall for the Deer Island Treatment Plant. It discharges treated sewage into Massachusetts Bay instead of into the shallower waters of Boston Harbor. Tunnel diameter 24 feet 3 inches (7.39 m)	15.3 km	120 m	1992–1998
North Cape Tunnel	Magerøya, Norway	Under Magerøysundet, a strait between the Norwegian mainland and the large island of Magerøya and the North Cape, Norway	6.8 km	212 m	1993–1999
Port Hedland Harbour Tunnel	Port Hedland, Australia	Carries iron ore fines under the Port of Port Hedland	1.030 km		1997–1999
Bømlafjord Tunnel	Føyno – Sveio, Norway	The deepest point of the International E-road network. Connects Stord municipality to the Norwegian mainland	7.8 km	260.4 m	1997–2000
Eiksund Tunnel	Møre og Romsdal, Norway	The world's second deepest undersea road tunnel (before 2019 world's deepest)	7.7 km	287 m	2003–2008
Xiang'an Tunnel	Xiamen, China		6.05 km	70 m	2005–2010
Busan–Geoje Fixed Link	Busan – Geoje, South Korea		3.7 km	48 m	2008–2010
Qingdao Jiaozhou Bay Tunnel	Hangdao – Qingdao, China		7.808 km	84.2 m	2006–2011
Marmaray	Istanbul (Bosphorus strait), Turkey	Rail tunnel connecting Asia and Europe. Length refers to the undersea section	1.39 km		2004–2013
Marina Coastal Expressway	Singapore	Singapore's first undersea tunnel	5 km		2008–2013
Port of Miami Tunnel	Miami, USA		2.1 km		2010–2014
Eurasia Tunnel	Istanbul (Bosphorus strait), Turkey	Road tunnel connecting Asia and Europe in Istanbul	5.4 km	106 m	2011–2016
Hong Kong–Zhuhai–Macau Bridge	Hong Kong – Macau, China	55 km-long sea crossing between Hong Kong, Macau and Zhuhai, China. Length refers to the tunnel section	6.7 km		2009–2018
Riachuelo Lot 3 Tunnel	Buenos Aires, Argentina	Outfall tunnel of the Riachuelo System - 2nd world's longest outfall undersea tunnel and 4th world's longest undersea tunnel excavated with TBM	12 km	48 m	2017–2019
The Ryfast Tunnel	Stavanger – Ryfylke, Norway	The longest and deepest undersea tunnel for cars, from Stavanger to Ryfylke	14.3 km	293 m	2013–2020
Eysturoyartunnilin	Faroe Islands	Sea crossing between Hvítanes, Strendur and Saltnes, under the Tangafjørður strait. Includes an underwater roundabout	11.24 km (overall length)	187 m	2017–2020
Tuen Mun–Chek Lap Kok Link	Hong Kong	Sea crossing between Tung Chung and Tuen Mun, Hong Kong. Length refers to the tunnel section.	5 km		2011–2020
Boryeong Undersea Tunnel	Boryeong, South Korea	5th longest undersea section in the world, connects Boryeong with Wonsan Island	6.927 km	80 m	2012-2021
Musaimeer Outfall Tunnel	Doha, Qatar	Diameter 3.7 m	10.2 km	40 m	2017-2021
Haicang Tunnel	Xiamen, China		6.293 km	73.6 m	2016–2021
East West Metro Tunnel	Kolkata, India	The biggest and the first underwater river railway tunnel in India. It is a metro railway tunnel connecting Kolkata to Howrah.	0.520 km	30 m	2021
Bangabandhu Sheikh Mujibur Rahman Tunnel	Chittagong, Bangladesh	First under-river road tunnel in South Asia	3.32 km	18 – 31 m	2019–2022
Hvalfjörður Tunnel	Capital Region, Iceland	Road tunnel serving as a link between Reykjavik and western portions of the country.	5.77 km	165 m	1996-1998
Great Belt Fixed Link	Sjælland, Sprogø, Denmark	Rail tunnel serving as a link between Sjælland and Sprogø.	8 km	80 m	1988-1995

== Proposed ==
=== Road ===
- Rogfast tunnel in Norway – construction having started in 2018, at 27 km length, 392 m depth, it will be the longest road tunnel and deepest undersea tunnel in the world.
- Karnaphuli Tunnel or Bangabandhu Sheikh Mujibur Rahman Tunnel in Bangladesh Tunnel is an underwater expressway tunnel in the port city of Chittagong, Bangladesh under the Karnaphuli river.
- Underwater Road Tunnel Salamina island-Perama - planned road tunnel in Attica, Greece. Currently at the second stage of the tender from which the concessionaire will be selected.
- India-Sri Lanka Sea Tunnel (proposed)
- Penang Undersea Tunnel in Malaysia – to open in 2025
- Western Harbour Tunnel in Sydney, New South Wales, Australia – to open in 2028
- Suðuroyartunnilin in the Faroe Islands – at least 25 km in length, it would connect the islands of Suðuroy and Skúgvoy to Sandoy, which is part of the fixed-link interconnected Faroese "mainland".
- Kross-Heimaey in Iceland - at 18 km length it would connect the island Heimaey to the mainland in South Iceland (geological studies and core sampling ongoing as of 2026)

=== Rail ===
- Bohai Strait tunnel in China between Dalian and Yantai (decided, construction to start 'as soon as possible'.)
- Helsinki to Tallinn Tunnel under the Gulf of Finland (proposed)
- Irish Sea Tunnel (suggested)
- Rio de Janeiro Metro Bay Tunnel (Line 3 – Rio de Janeiro-Niterói) (proposed)
- Fehmarn Belt Fixed Link between Denmark and Germany (decided, construction started in January 2021)
- Mumbai–Ahmedabad high-speed rail corridor of India (decided, construction start November 2018)
- Taiwan Strait Tunnel - if built would become the longest rail tunnel in the world. Engineering challenges and the unsolved political status of Taiwan make construction unlikely
- Strait of Gibraltar Tunnel - linking Gibraltar or the Spanish mainland to the African mainland. If built it would most likely become the deepest tunnel ever built

== See also ==
- Immersed tube tunnel
- Intercontinental and transoceanic fixed links
- Shark tunnel
