= Setonaikai National Park =

National Park in Seto Inland Sea, Japan

- 瀬戸内海国立公園
- IUCN category II (national park)
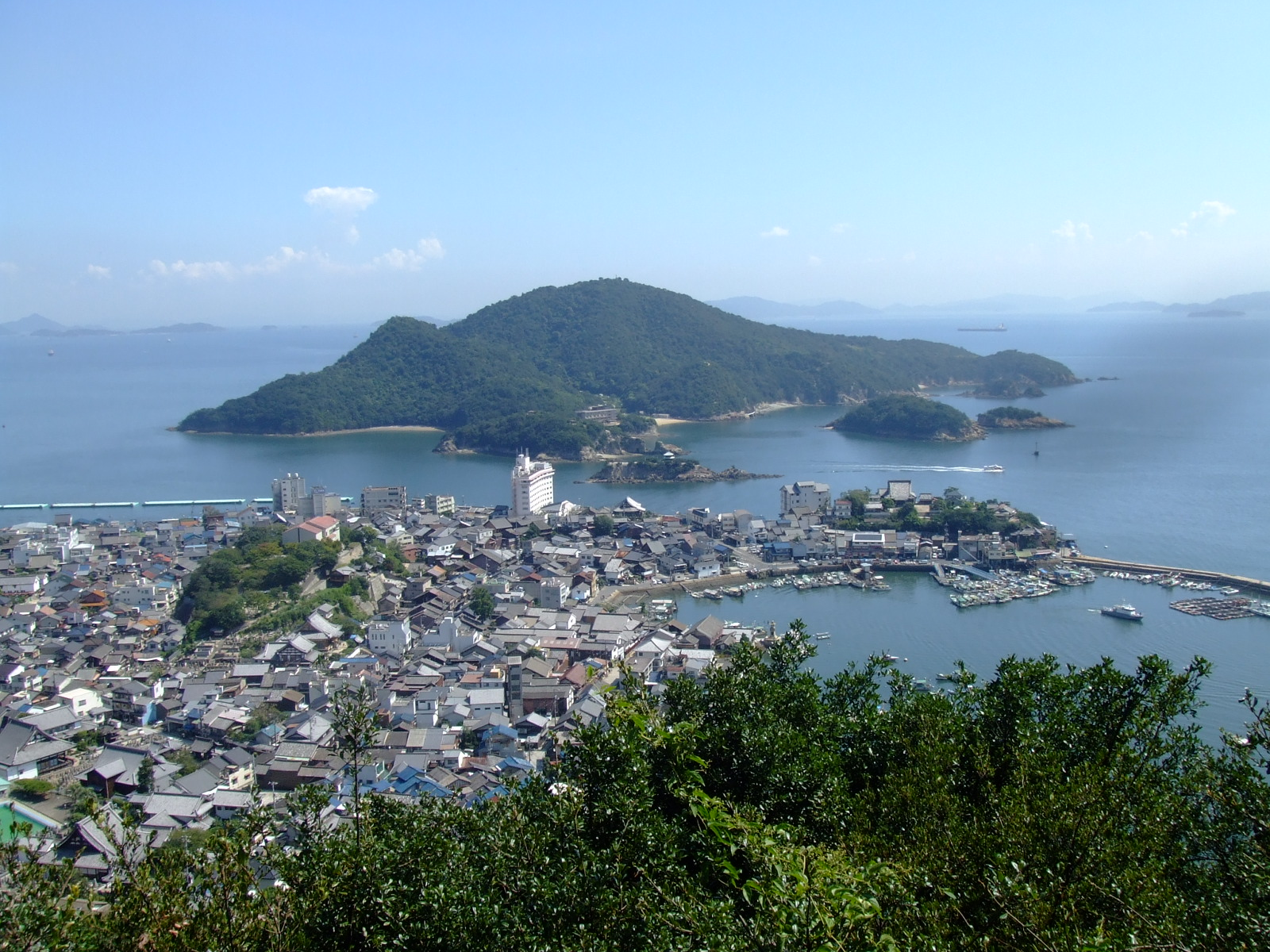
- Tomonoura

- Location within Japan
- Location: Seto Inland Sea, Japan
- Coordinates: 34°10′N 133°20′E
- Area: 669.34 km^{2} (258.43 sq mi)
- Established: March 16, 1934
- Governing body: Ministry of the Environment (Japan)

Setonaikai National Park (瀬戸内海国立公園, Setonaikai Kokuritsu Kōen) is a Japanese national park, comprising areas of Japan's Seto Inland Sea, and of ten bordering prefectures. Designated a national park in 1934, it has since been expanded several times. It contains about 3,000 islands, known as the Setouchi Islands, including the well-known Itsukushima. As the park encompasses many non-contiguous areas, and covers a tiny proportion of the Inland Sea's total extent, control and protection is problematic; much of the wider area is heavily industrialized.

== History ==
In 1934, when the area was envisioned as Japan's first national park, it was far smaller than the expanse of today. Sixteen years later, in 1950, an expansion would seek to include other iconic sites in the region, bringing the total area roughly up to that of the present-day. Setonaikai is the biggest national park in Japan.

In 1996, Itsukushima Shrine (in Hiroshima prefecture) was registered as a "cultural site of world heritage" by UNESCO. It is known as one of the top three "most scenic spots" in Japan.

In the 1960s and 1970s, a period of rapid economic growth was fueled in Japan, resulting in industrial contamination of the surrounding environment. In both fresh and ocean waters, unmonitored chemical runoff led to reduced water quality, mainly due to area farms' use of synthetic fertilizers, pesticides, and herbicides. Detrimental levels of heavy metals began to rise, gradually affecting the natural food chain and greater ecosystem. Starting in the 1980s (and continuing on into the present day), water quality has been drastically improved; stricter regulations on chemical use and runoff have been enforced, as well as advancements in technology, namely a high-performance sewage disposal.

== Climate ==
Setonaikai National Park maintains relatively mild temperatures throughout the year, so the climate is sometimes referred to as "Mediterranean"; in essence, the average temperature in winter rarely dips below freezing, or above 90°F (around 30°C) in the summer.

== Sites ==
There are numerous sightseeing places in the national park. Kanmon Strait is one of them. It is between Honshu and Kyushu. A suspension bridge called the Kanmon Bridge spans the strait. In 1973, when it was opened for the public, it was the longest bridge (0.66 miles) in Asia.

The Naruto whirlpools in Tokushima Prefecture are tidal whirlpools in the Naruto Strait, a channel between Naruto and Awaji Island in Hyōgo Prefecture. The whirlpools, one of the prefecture's major tourist attractions, are formed due to a narrow width (0.8 miles) of the strait and a water level difference of 5.6 feet between the Inland Sea and the Open Sea caused by the ebb and flow of the tide. It sometimes creates a whirlpool 100 feet in diameter.

== Facilities ==
There are facilities where people can experience and learn about nature in the park. Mt. Rokko Nature Conservation Center and Mt. Rokko Guide House in Hyōgo prefecture are places where people can find natural specimens of Mt. Rokko.

Wasuzan Business Center is in Okayama prefecture. It stands on the top of Washuzan Mountain. It is near Seto-ohashi Bridge which is a series of ten bridges between Okayama and Kagawa prefectures. The total length is 8.1 miles (13.1 km). From the center, people can see the panorama of the bridge and the Inland Sea. It is possible to learn about the nature around the bridge and the history of the Inland Sea.

== Natural areas ==
- Islands: Awaji Island (part), Bōyo Islands, Ieshima, Miyajima, Naoshima, Shiwaku Islands, Shōdoshima, Tomogashima
- Mountains: Mount Rokkō, Mount Maya, Mount Noro
- Straits: Akashi Strait, Hōyo Strait, Kitan Strait, Naruto Strait, Kanmon Straits
- Other: Naruto whirlpools

== Cultural sites ==
- Shrines: Itsukushima Jinja, Kotohira-gū, Mekari Shrine
- Temples: Futago-ji, Yashima-ji

== Related municipalities ==
The park crosses the borders of 55 cities, 14 towns, and one village:

- Ehime: Ikata, Imabari, Kamijima, Matsuyama, Ōzu, Saijō, Yawatahama
- Fukuoka: Kitakyushu
- Hiroshima: Etajima, Fukuyama, Hatsukaichi, Higashihiroshima, Hiroshima, Kure, Mihare, Onomichi, Ōsakikamijima, Ōtake, Saka, Takehara
- Hyōgo: Aioi, Akashi, Akō, Ashiya, Awaji, Himeji, Kobe, Minamiawaji, Nishinomiya, Sumoto, Takarazuka, Tatsuno
- Kagawa: Higashikagawa, Kan'onji, Kotohira, Mannō, Marugame, Mitoyo, Naoshima, Sakaide, Sanuki, Shōdoshima, Tadotsu, Takamatsu, Tonoshō, Zentsūji
- Ōita: Bungotakada, Himeshima, Kunisaki, Ōita
- Okayama: Asakuchi, Bizen, Kasaoka, Kurashiki, Okayama, Setouchi, Tamano
- Tokushima: Naruto
- Wakayama: Wakayama
- Yamaguchi: Hikari, Hirao, Hōfu, Iwakuni, Kaminoseki, Kudamatsu, Shimonoseki, Shūnan, Suō-Ōshima, Tabuse, Yanai

== See also ==
- List of national parks of Japan
