= Tongyeong Undersea Tunnel =

Tunnel in South Korea

Coordinates: 34.8342°N 128.4101°E

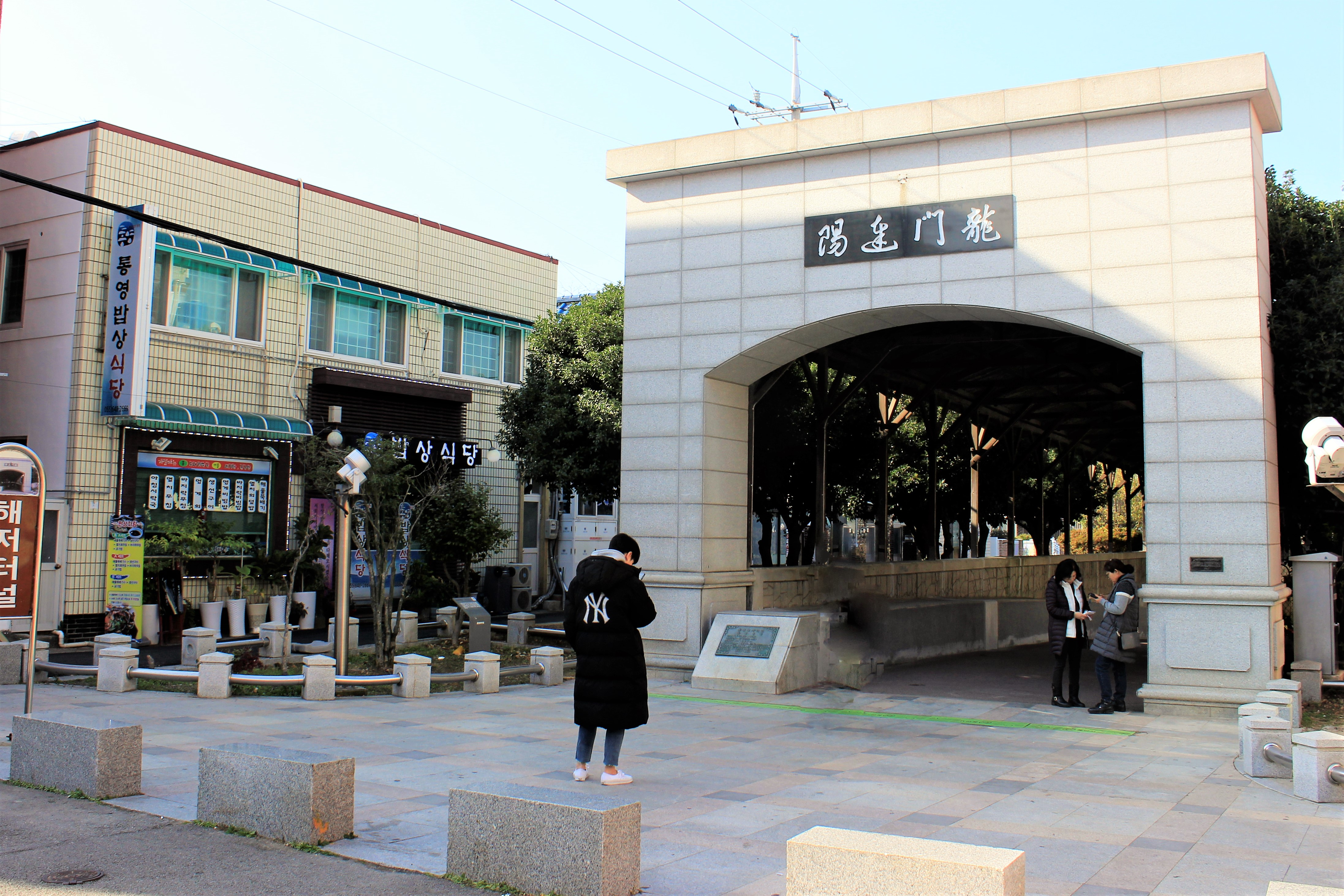
Tongyeong Undersea Tunnel

The Tongyeong Undersea Tunnel (Korean: 통영해저터널; Hanja: 統營海底터널) is an undersea tunnel in South Korea that links the city of Tongyeong in Goseong County to the island Mireukdo. The tunnel is 5 m wide by 3.5 m high and 483 m long, and is 13.5 m below the sea surface at high tide. Completed in 1932 when Korea was under Japanese rule, it was the first undersea tunnel in Asia. Before the tunnel was built Mireukdo was a tidal island, accessible on foot at low tide. Originally built for motor vehicles, the tunnel is now only used by pedestrians.
