= Kanmon Tunnel =

Kanmon Tunnel may refer to:

- Kanmon Railway Tunnel, undersea rail tunnel connecting the islands of Honshu and Kyushu
- Kanmon Roadway Tunnel, undersea road tunnel connecting Shimonoseki, Yamaguchi and Moji-ku, Kitakyūshū
- Kanmon Roadway Tunnel § Pedestrian tunnel, undersea pedestrian tunnel underneath the Kanmon Roadway Tunnel
- Shin-Kanmon Tunnel, undersea rail tunnel connecting Shin-Shimonoseki Station and Kokura Station
