= Mount Noro =

Mountain in the country of Japan

- 野呂山

Highest point
- Elevation: 839 m (2,753 ft)
- Prominence: 839 m (2,753 ft)
- Coordinates: 34.269°N 132.678°E

Geography
- Location: Kure, Hiroshima, Japan

Geology
- Mountain type: Igneous rock

Climbing
- Easiest route: car

Mount Noro (野呂山, Noro-san) is a mountain around Hiroshima, Japan. It is part of the Setonaikai National Park.

Mount Misen is famous for mountain climbing, trekking, camping and sakura, camellia, hydrangea, autumn leaves and maples and sunset view.

There are historical shrines and temples include Noro Shrine (野呂神社, Noro-jinja) and Kōbō Temple (弘法寺, Kōbō-ji).
