= Mekari Shrine =

Shinto shrine in Fukuoka Prefecture, Japan

Mekari-jinja 和布刈神社
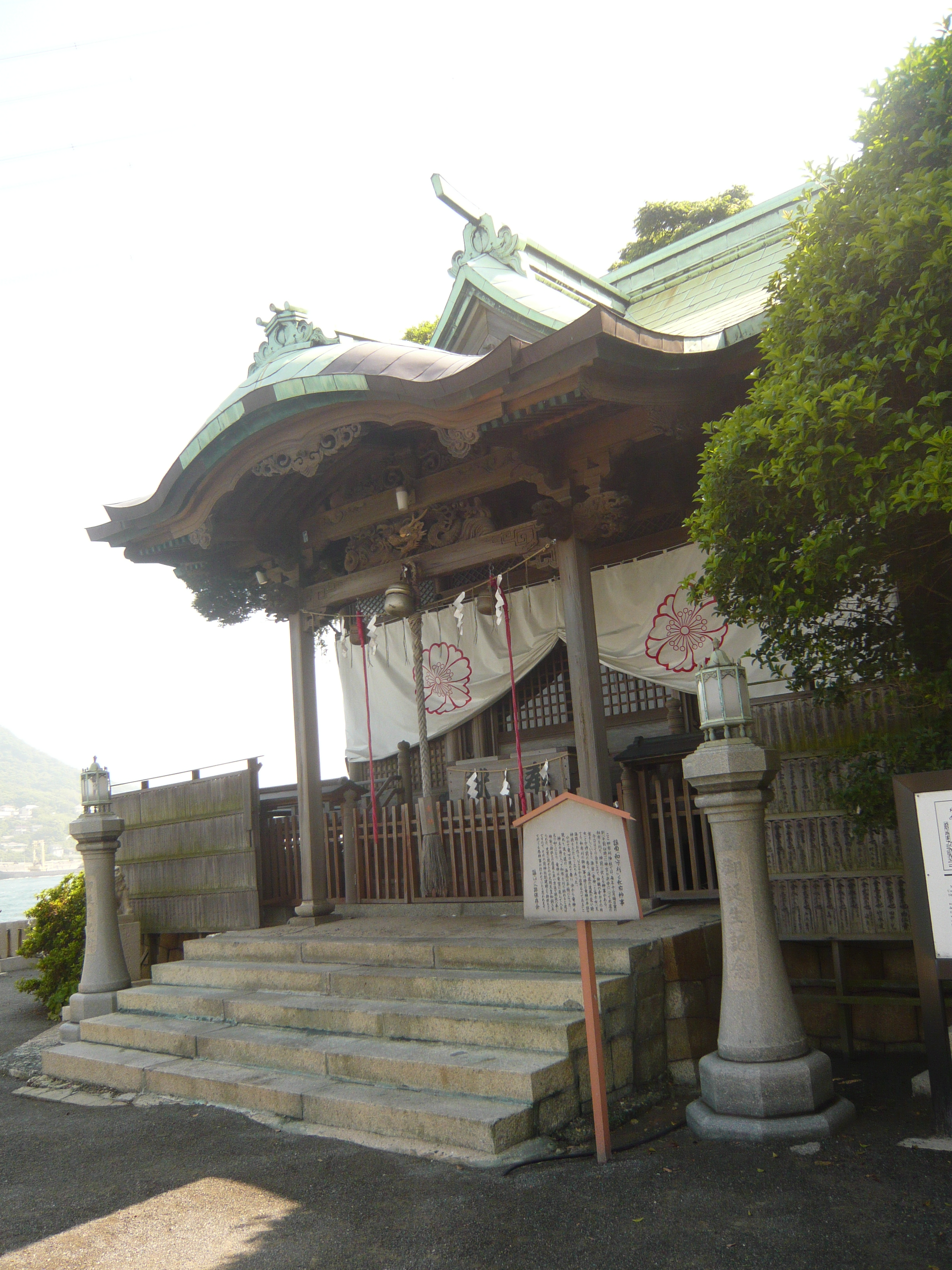
- The honden, or main shrine

- Location within Japan

Religion
- Affiliation: Shinto
- Deity: Emperor Chūai; Empress Jingū

Location
- Location: 3492, Moji, Moji-ku, Kitakyūshū; Fukuoka 801-0855
- Interactive map of Mekari-jinja 和布刈神社
- Coordinates: 33°57′39″N 130°57′44″E

Architecture
- Established: C.200 AD

Website
- mekarijinjya.web.officelive.com

Mekari Shrine (和布刈神社, Mekari-jinja) is a Shinto shrine located in Moji-ku, Kitakyūshū, Fukuoka, Japan.

== History ==
The wife of Emperor Chūai, Empress Jingū, came here sometime during the legendary military invasion of Korea in the 3rd century. She had Mekari Shrine built as a way of giving thanks to the Kami. The present main shrine was rebuilt in 1767 by the Ogasawara clan from Harima.

== Mekari Shinji Shinto ritual ==
In the shrine's Shinto ritual called Mekari Shinji, wakame seaweed is cut from the ocean at low tide and offered to an altar in a ceremony conducted in the early morning hours of the first day of the New Year according to the old lunar calendar. The ritual is thought to bring about good luck and has been designated an Intangible Folk Cultural Asset by Fukuoka prefecture.

== See also ==
- List of Shinto shrines

== Gallery ==
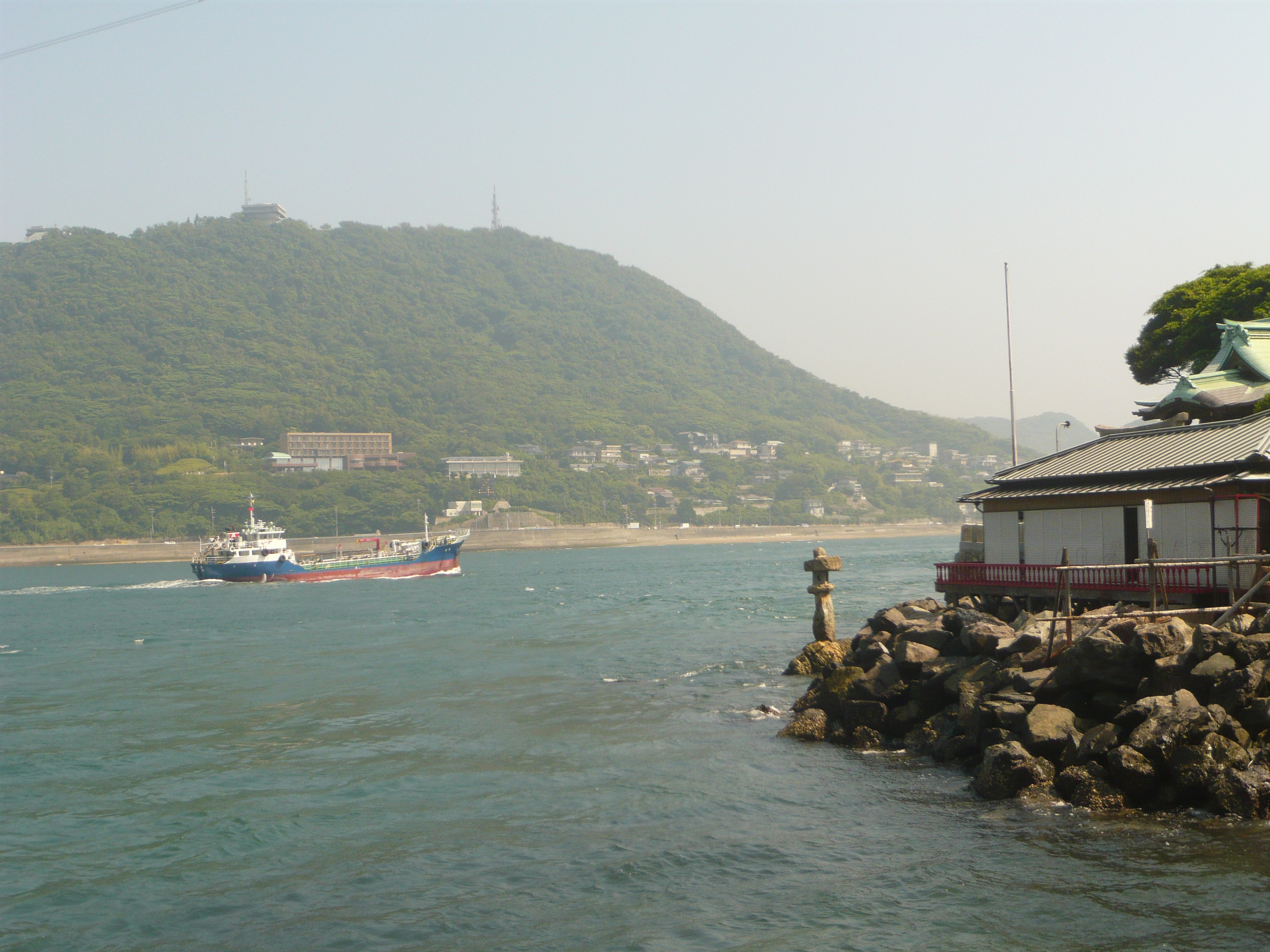
View of Kanmon Straits from the shrine

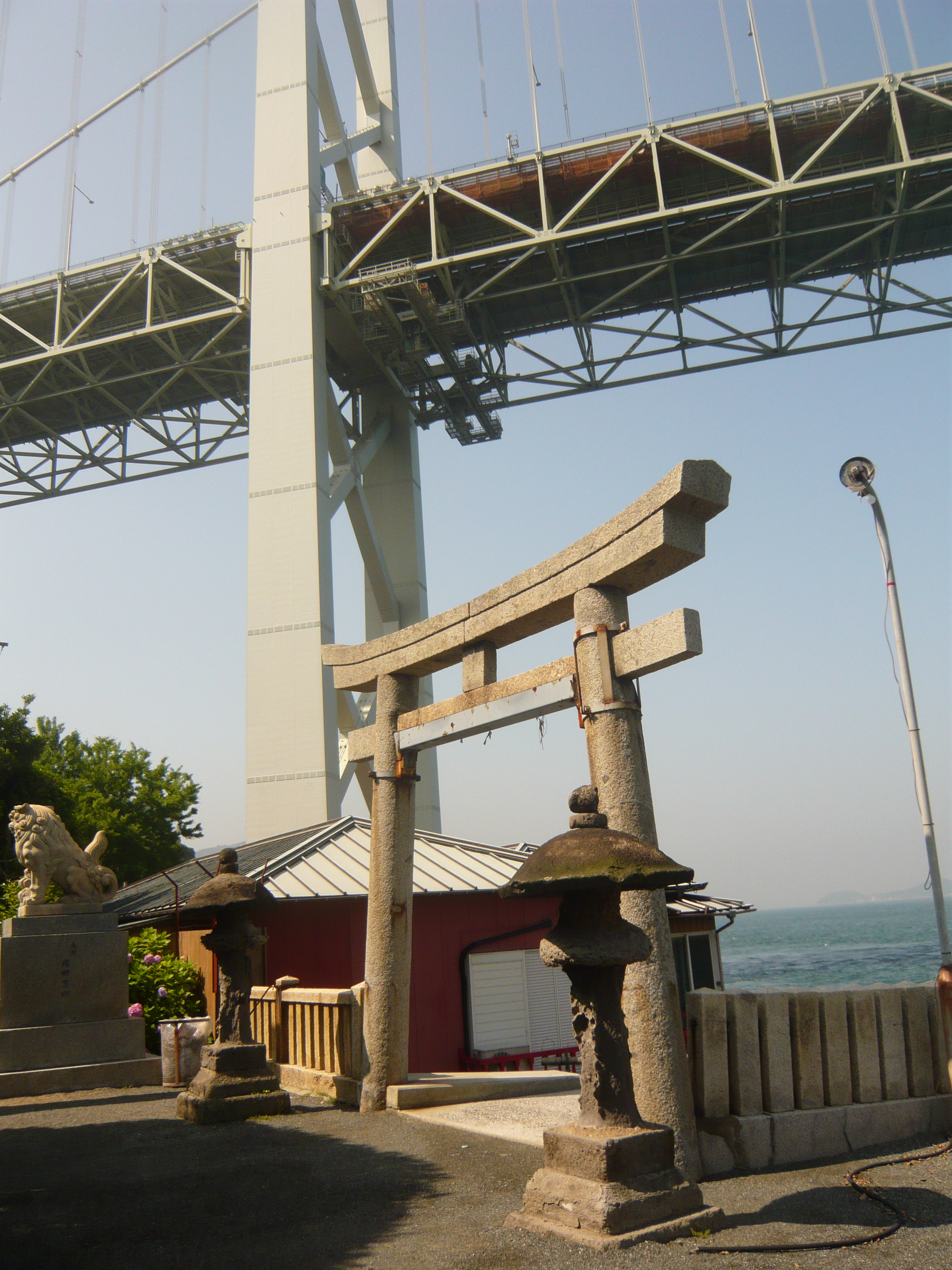
A torii standing with Kanmonkyo Bridge in background
