= Underwater Road Tunnel Salamina island - Perama =

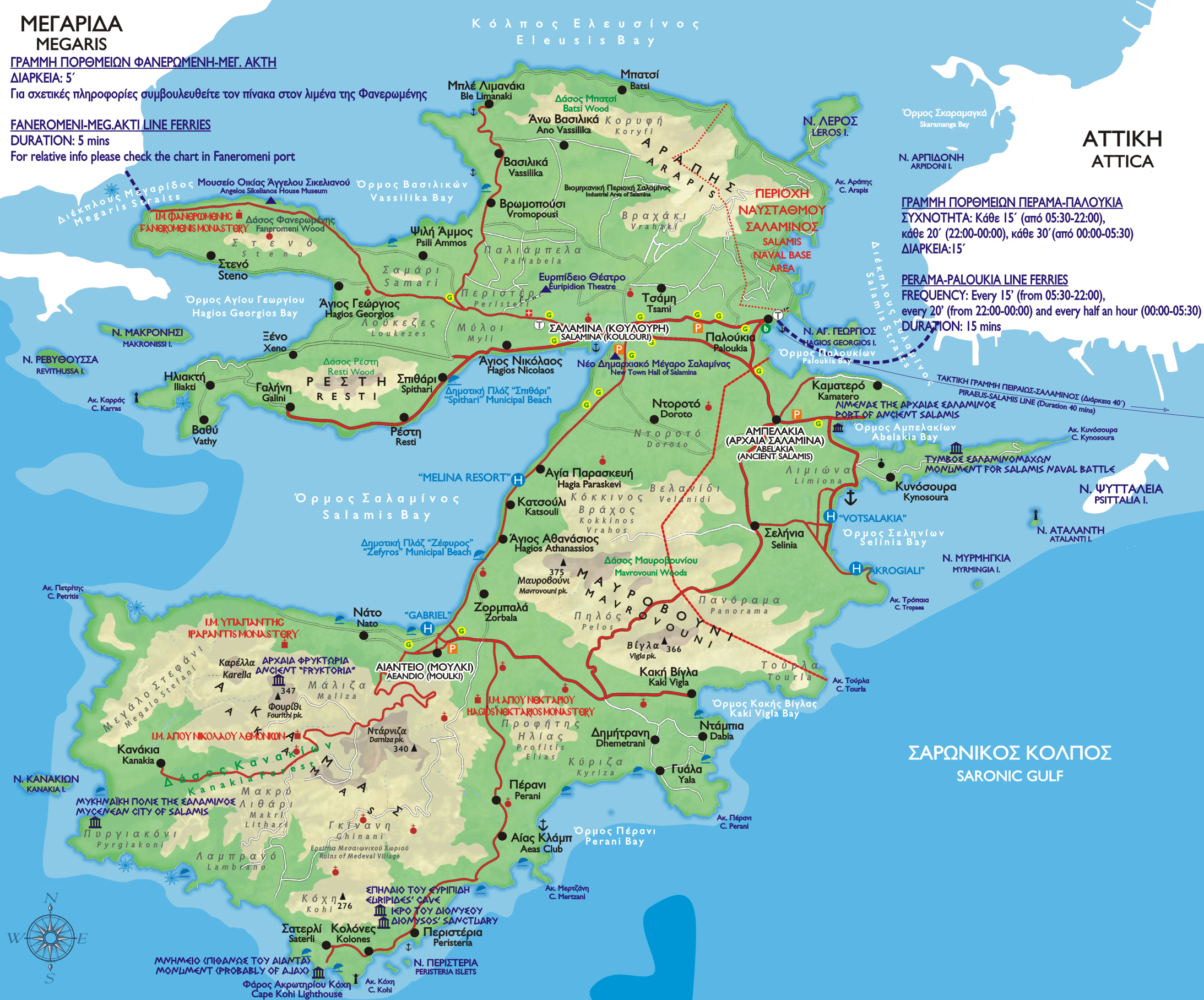
- Map of the island of Salamis. The current ferry line to/from Perama can be seen in the north-east (blue intermittent line)

Overview
- Location: Attica Region, Greece
- Status: Planned (Stage B of the tender)
- Crosses: Saronic Gulf
- Start: Perama
- End: Salamis Island

The Underwater Road Tunnel Salamina island - Perama is a planned sub-sea road tunnel in the Attica region of Greece, which will provide a direct road link between the island of Salamis of Islands Regional unit in the Saronic Gulf and the port city of Perama in Piraeus Regional Unit, on the east coast of the Saronic Gulf. In whole, the project includes the construction of an underwater road tunnel about 1 km long, the construction of a new road section from Schistos Avenue to the tunnel's entrance in Perama, as well as two new interchanges connecting the adjacent road network in Salamis and Perama.

The project has been tendered through the procedure of Competitive Dialogue and is currently at the second stage (stage B) of the tender from which the contractor (concessionaire) will be selected. Three contenders currently participate in the tender: Metka, Terna and a consortium between Vinci Concessions – Vinci Highways – Aktor Concessions. Its cost is estimated at €450 million and its construction period at around four years. When completed, the total length of the new road axis will be about 17 km and the undersea link will significantly reduce the travel time between Salamis and the mainland from about 40 minutes to just 4 minutes.

== History ==
The first plans for an underwater road link between Salamis Island and the Greek mainland took place more than 20 years ago and the first tender was planned under the ministry of Stefanos Manos in the early 1990s. In October 1995 the project was cancelled by decision of Costas Laliotis and since then the planning of a new road link has been constantly coming to the fore but there has been no consensus for its construction, mainly due to opposition from the joint ventures that operate the ferry services. The Paloukia (at Salamis) - Perama ferry line is the busiest one in Greece in terms of traffic volume, handling 9.8 million passengers and 4 million vehicles as of 2009.

In 2012, the then Minister of Infrastructure and Transport Makis Voridis, decided to hold a tender to award the concession of the contract, but the process was continuously extended. After numerous successive extensions, the tender finally began and the project was bidded out on March 15, 2016, after the completion of the Expression of Interest (EoI) phase. The project has been tendered through the procedure of Competitive Dialogue in which opinions, proposals and comments are submitted by the participants, the Ministry of Infrastructure and Transport and the local administrative bodies.

On November 17, 2016, stage B of the tender began. The three groups that currently participate in this phase are: Metka, Terna and the consortium between Vinci Concessions - Vinci Highways - Aktor Concessions.

On January 30, 2018, the Greek Council of State rejected all the allegations made by the Salamis Environmental Group "PERIVOS" as unfounded. The group had appealed to the council and asked for the decision by the Minister of Infrastructure to hold the tender to be annulled as unconstitutional and illegal.

In September 2018, the Environmental Impact Assessment (EIA) of the project began. By the spring of 2020, the Competitive Dialogue procedure had been completed and approval had been obtained by the Archaeological Documentation Service and the Hellenic Navy General Staff. The next step is the completion of the EIA and its approval by the Ministry of the Environment and Energy, and finally the start of the third and final stage of the tender, which is the evaluation of the technical and financial bids and the selection of the contractor (concessionaire) of the project.

== Description ==
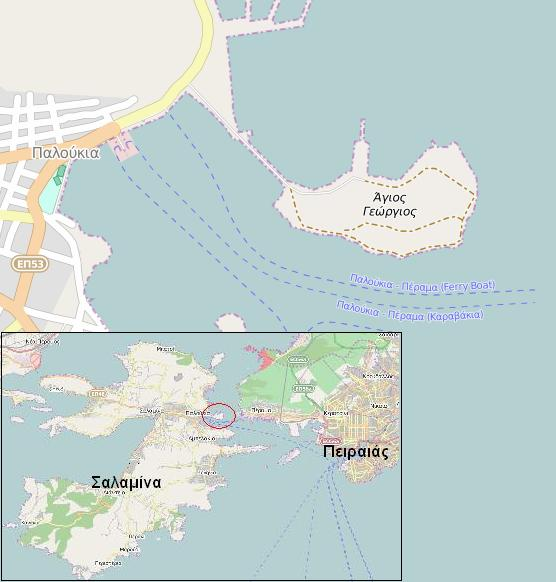
The location of the uninhabited island of Agios Georgios. The underwater tunnel will emerge here and the road will then head further west to Salamis

The main project concerns the construction of an underwater road tunnel based on the seabed, with 2 lanes in each direction and with a length of about 400 meters (total length of about 1.1 km including the access roads in both sides), which will start from a new interchange in Perama and end in another interchange on the eastern side of the Salamis Island, in its main port of Paloukia. The project also includes the construction of new road sections bypassing the towns of Perama and Salamina. In particular, a new road section will be constructed near the existing Schistos-Skaramagkas Avenue and will extend up to the port of Perama on the Saronic Gulf's eastern coast, where an interchange will be constructed connecting the adjacent road network. From there, the road will gradually submerge beneath the sea with the construction of the underwater road tunnel. The tunnel will then emerge on the small uninhabited island of Agios Georgios and the road will proceed up to the entrance of the Salamis Naval Base in the northeastern part of Salamis Island. In the village of Paloukia, a new junction will be constructed and the road will then proceed north of Paloukia, up to another interchange that will be constructed north of the town of Salamina, connecting all the adjacent roads. The total length of the new road axis that will be constructed will be about 17 kilometres (11 mi).
