= Helsinki–Tallinn Tunnel =

Proposed rail undersea tunnel

Coordinates: 59°48′22″N 24°49′05″E

- Interactive map of Helsinki–Tallinn Tunnel

Overview
- Location: Gulf of Finland (Baltic Sea)
- Status: Planned
- Start: Ülemiste, Estonia
- End: Pasila, Helsinki, Finland

Technical
- No. of tracks: 2
- Track gauge: 1,435 mm (4 ft 8 1/2 in) (standard gauge)

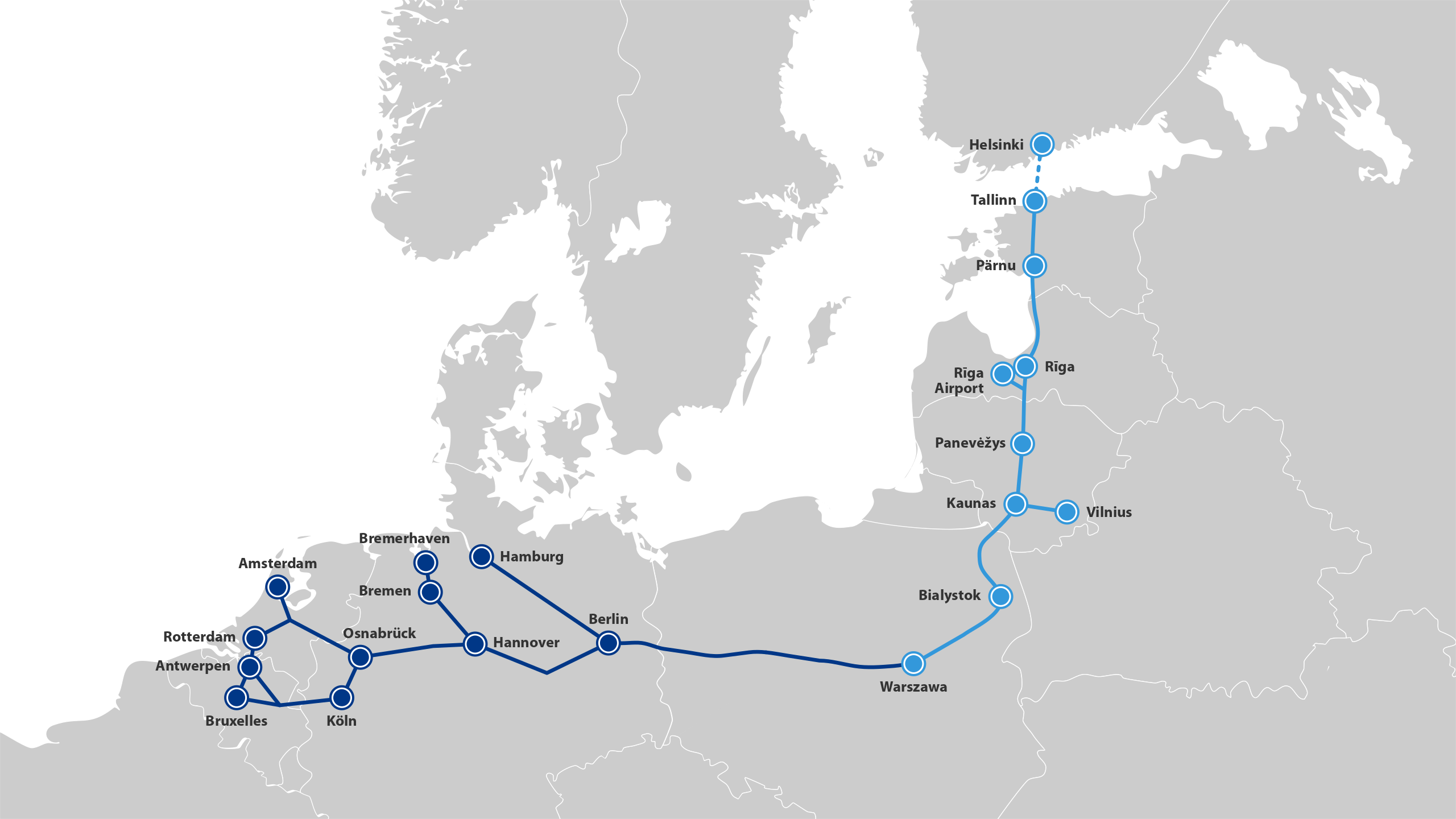
The tunnel in the context of the larger Rail Baltica project

The Helsinki–Tallinn Tunnel (also known as FinEst or Talsinki tunnel) is a proposed undersea tunnel that would span the Gulf of Finland and connect the Finnish and Estonian capitals by train. The tunnel's length would depend on the route taken: the shortest distance across would have a submarine length of 80 km (50 mi), which would make it 40% longer than the current longest railway tunnel in the world, the 57 km (35 mi)-long Gotthard Base Tunnel in Switzerland.

During the 2010s, it was estimated that the tunnel, if constructed, would cost €9–13 billion and could open in the 2030s if approved. In 2013, the European Union approved €3.1 million in funding for feasibility studies. A 2015 pre-feasibility study proposed trains traveling with a top speed of 250 km/h (155 mph).

== Background ==
Helsinki and Tallinn are separated by the Gulf of Finland. The distance between the cities is approximately 80 kilometres (50 mi). As of 2026, the majority of travel between the two capitals has been made by ferries and fast passenger ships, with travel time varying from 1 hour 40 minutes (fast summer ferries operating from April to October) to three and a half hours (normal ferries operating year-round), but most ferries now take two hours. In 2025 7.3 million passengers traveled by boat between Helsinki and Tallinn. Additionally, approximately 300,000 air trips are made per year between the cities. On the other hand, overland travel between Helsinki and Tallinn requires an 800-kilometre (500 mi) journey through Russia, passing through Leningrad Oblast; however, since the beginning of the Russo-Ukrainian war in 2022, both Estonia and Finland have significantly restricted border crossings with Russia.

== Project status ==
In 2008, a funding application was about to be approved by the European Union, enabling countries to acquire between €500,000 and €800,000 of the additional funds required for a comprehensive survey. On 13 January 2009, newspaper reports suggested the application to the EU, through the Interreg programme, for comprehensive surveys had been denied. An expert at the City of Helsinki's International Affairs department suggested this may have been because of political tension within Estonia, between the national administration and the City of Tallinn, both controlled by rival political groups. Nevertheless, both cities are said to be considering funding the surveys themselves.

On 2 April 2014, it was announced that a €100,000 preparatory survey named TalsinkiFix would assess whether a more comprehensive profitability calculation should be conducted. The European Union will cover 85% of the survey costs, and the cities of Helsinki and Tallinn, as well as Harju County, will pay the rest. This was the first official survey about the tunnel.

The results of the preparatory survey were released in February 2015. The total cost of the tunnel's construction was estimated to be €9–13 billion, and the tunnel could open at the earliest after 2030. The survey recommended the tunnel to be built for railway connections only, with the traveling time between Helsinki and Tallinn being half an hour by train.

On 4 January 2016, it was announced that the transport ministers of Finland and Estonia, as well as the leadership of the cities of Helsinki and Tallinn, would sign a memorandum on traffic cooperation between the two countries, including a further study to examine the feasibility of the tunnel. This study is the first to be conducted at the state level and will focus on the tunnel's socio-economic effects and geological analysis. Finland and Estonia were seeking financial support from the EU for the study. In June 2016, the EU granted €1 million for the study, which was expected to be ready in early 2018.

In August 2016, a two-year study was launched by the Helsinki-Uusimaa Regional Council. Other partners in the study are the government of Harju County, the cities of Helsinki and Tallinn, the Finnish Transport Agency, and the Estonian Ministry of Economic Affairs and Communications. The project is headed by Kari Ruohonen, the former director general of the Finnish Transport Agency.

In February 2017, two consortia were commissioned to study aspects of the project. One will study passenger and freight volumes and do a cost-benefit analysis. The other will study the technical aspects of the project.

In March 2019, a similar project by Peter Vesterbacka has moved forward. Vesterbacka has signed a tentative contract with a Chinese investment company called Touchstone Capital Partners. The deal consists of a memorandum of understanding for a 15 billion euros financial deal to fund four stations, the tunnel, and the trains.

On 26 April 2021, the governments of Estonia and Finland signed a Memorandum of Understanding (MoU) on mutual cooperation in the transport sector. The MoU included the undertaking that both countries would cooperate in large-scale transport projects, such as the Helsinki-Tallinn railway tunnel, but it did not commit any of the parties to any particular project. The MoU will remain in force until 2030.

On 8 February 2024, Finnish Minister of Transport and Communications Lulu Ranne of Finns Party stated in an interview for Estonian newspaper Postimees that the tunnel is "unrealistic" and not on the government's agenda, with the project remaining on hold unless the European Union decides to allocate additional funding for it.

On 26 August 2026, the mayors of Tallinn and Helsinki, Peeter Raudsepp and Daniel Sazonov respectively, met in Helsinki and agreed that the two city governments will take the initiative of developing the tunnel into their own hands. Both cities will set up a new inter-city preparatory group to continue detailed preparation of the project. The situational picture of the tunnel project will be updated during the autumn in order to serve as a basis for this work, and previous preparatory work relating to the tunnel will be compiled in order to take concrete next steps.

== Cost and benefits ==
The cost of the tunnel connection has been tentatively estimated to be €9–13 billion. This includes €3 billion for the tunnel excavation, €2–3 billion for infrastructure and security systems, over €1 billion for rolling stock and other equipment, and a €1–3 billion risk margin for unexpected situations. The project is estimated to be financially feasible if the European Union covers at least 40% of the cost, the rest being shared by Finland and Estonia, and the two capital cities (for comparison, the Rail Baltica project has received 85% of its funding from the EU).

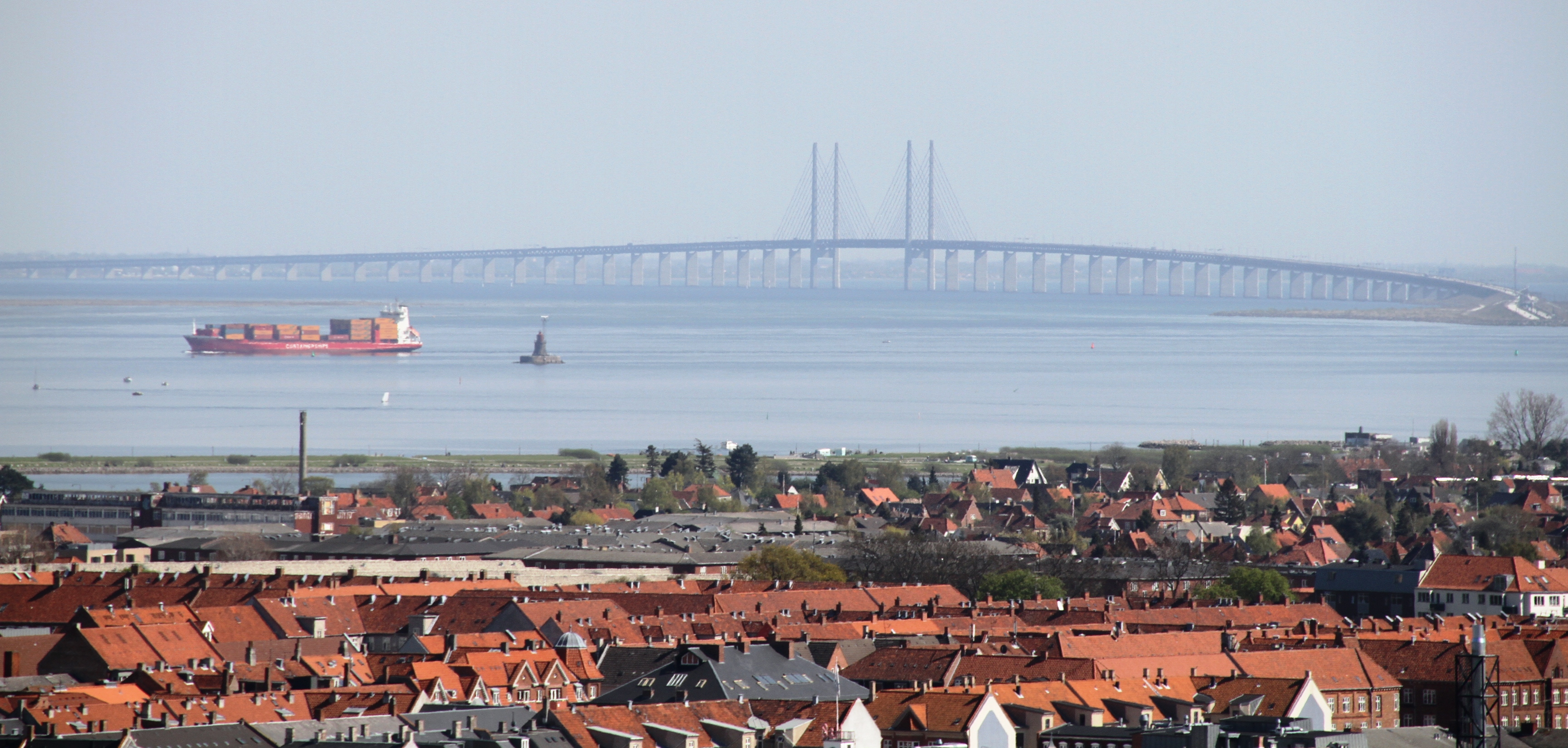
The Øresund Bridge integrates the cities of Copenhagen and Malmö into a single economic area. The Helsinki–Tallinn tunnel is expected to have a similar effect.

The economic benefits would be significant, both in terms of increased connections and economic integration between the two cities (the Øresund Region has been offered as an example), but also in a wider context of convenient passenger train connections between Southern Finland and the Baltic states, and a fixed link for freight from across Finland on to the Rail Baltica, thus providing a rail freight connection with the rest of Europe. An estimated 12.5 million annual passengers would use the tunnel.

Geopolitically, the tunnel would connect two close but separated parts of the European Union in an environmentally friendly way, removing the need to use sea or air transport, or to travel through Russia. The Helsinki–Tallinn connection is part of the EU's TEN-T network's North Sea–Baltic corridor. The ports of Helsinki and Tallinn have previously received EU funding to improve transport conditions between the two cities.

The investment for the tunnel was estimated to pay itself back in about 17 years. Suggested passenger prices were 50 euros one-way and 2500 euros for an unlimited annual ticket.

== Technical details ==
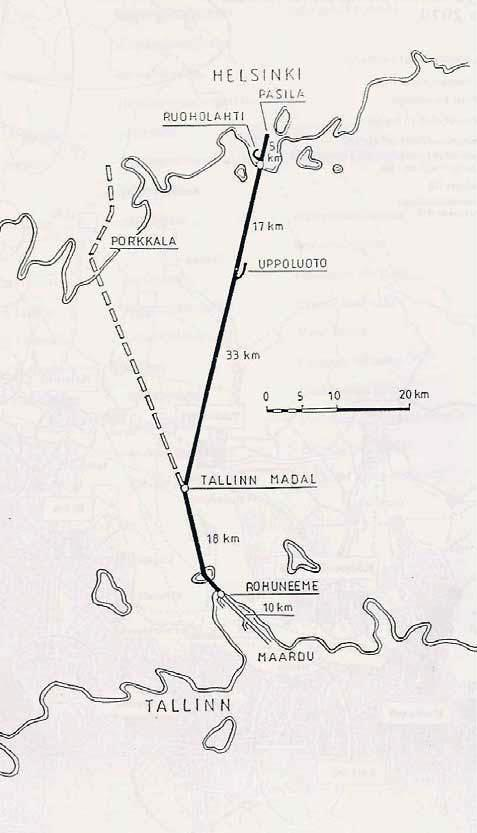
A map of the assessed tunnel routes between Tallinn and Helsinki.

Railways in Finland and Estonia use the Russian 1,524 mm (5 ft) track gauge. The Helsinki–Tallinn tunnel would according to current planning instead use standard gauge 1,435 mm (4 ft 8 1/2 in) tracks to connect directly to Rail Baltica which is being built to the same gauge. Trains traveling through the tunnel from Tallinn to Helsinki could therefore not continue onwards to other Finnish destinations and vice versa (apart from the Rail Baltica track) without new tracks being built or the use of a variable gauge system. Tentative plans have been made to build separate freight stations in Southern Finland (Riihimäki and Tampere have been suggested) to load trains outside Helsinki for transportation through the tunnel. Tampere and Helsinki Airport could also host passenger terminals for trains heading to Tallinn and onwards to Central Europe.

== Studies ==
- Usko Anttikoski. "Fixed transport connections across the Baltic from Finland to Sweden and Estonia. Preliminary feasibility assessment." 2007.
- "Emerald, Vision 2050" Greater Helsinki Vision 2050 – International Ideas Competition. 2007.
- Ilkka Vähäaho, Pekka Raudasmaa. "Feasibility Study, Helsinki–Tallinn, Railway Tunnel" Geotechnical Division of the Real Estate Department of the City Of Helsinki. 2008.
- Jaakko Blomberg, Gunnar Okk. "Opportunities for Cooperation between Estonia and Finland 2008" Prime Minister's Office, Finland. 2008.

== See also ==
- Proposed high-speed rail by country
- Rail Baltica - railway from Poland to Estonia
- Rail transport in Estonia
- Rail transport in Finland
- Øresund Bridge - connection between Sweden and Denmark
- Undersea tunnel
- Channel Tunnel - rail connection between England and France
- Irish Sea Tunnel - proposed connection between Ireland and Great Britain
- Fehmarn Belt Fixed Link – an immersed tunnel under construction between Denmark and Germany
