= Kanmon Roadway Tunnel =

Road tunnel under the Kanmon Straits, Japan

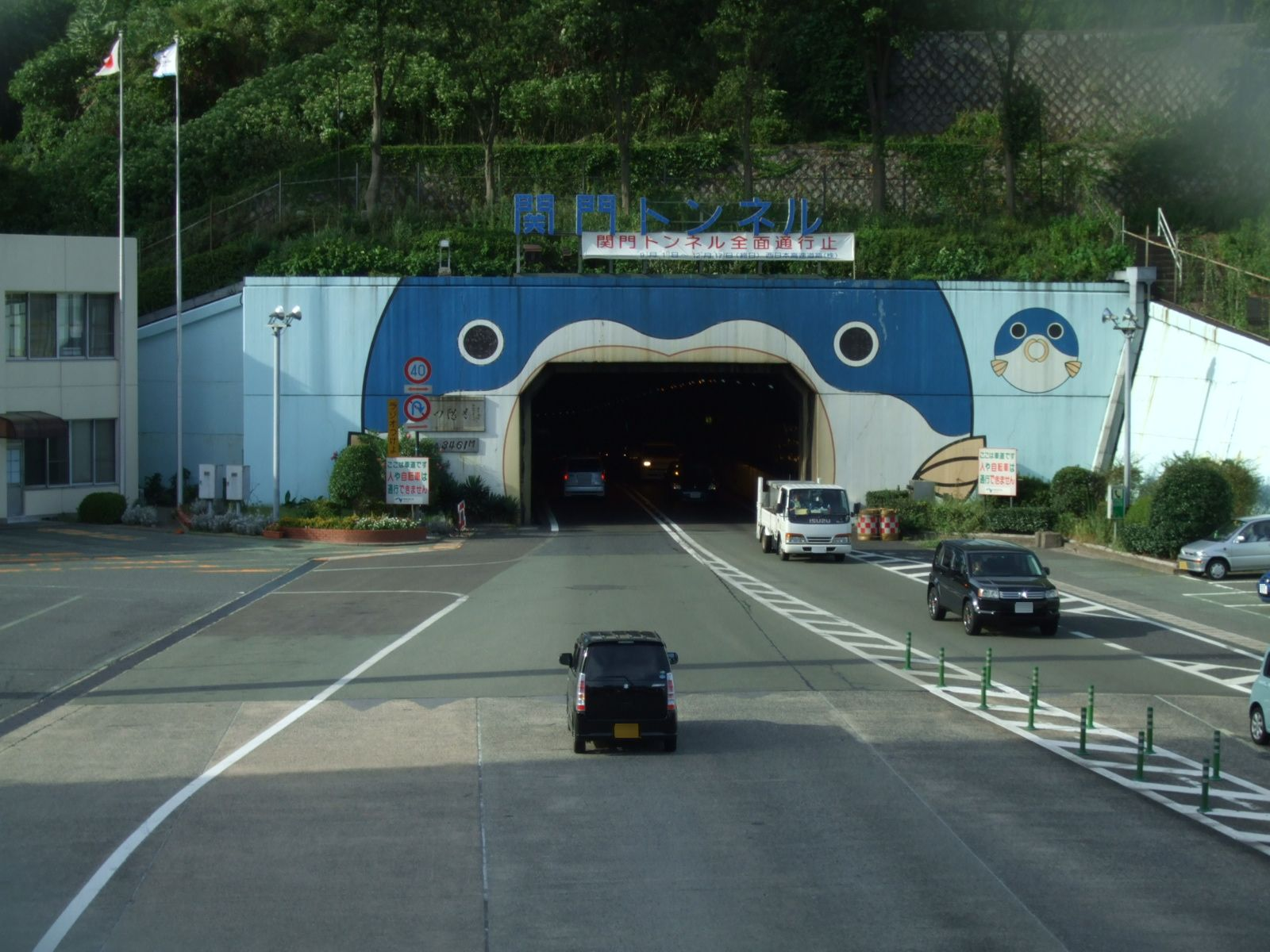
- Moji side portal of the Kanmon Roadway Tunnel
- Interactive map of Kanmon Roadway Tunnel

Overview
- Line: National Route 2
- Location: Honshu-Kyushu
- Coordinates: 33°57′48.6″N 130°57′33.6″E

Operation
- Opened: 1958

Technical
- Line length: 3,461 m (11,355 ft)
- Min elevation: 58 m (190 ft) below sea level

In Japan, the Kanmon Roadway Tunnel (Japanese: 関門国道トンネル, Hepburn: kanmon kokudō tonneru) carries National Route 2 under the Kanmon Straits. At the time of its construction, it was the longest undersea highway in the world. It opened in 1958. The overall length is 3,461 metres (11,355 ft) meters, and it is 58 metres (190 ft) below sea level at the deepest point. The endpoints are in Shimonoseki, Yamaguchi and Moji-ku, Kitakyūshū. According to a United Press report at the time, 53 workers were killed during its construction, and it was second only to the Mersey Railway tunnel in length for an underwater tunnel.

Work on the Kanmon Roadway Tunnel began in 1937, but was halted in 1939 by World War II. Work resumed in 1952, and the tunnel was officially opened on March 9, 1958. The event was marked by a Japanese commemorative postage stamp. Major repairs were conducted in 2008.

Under terms of Article 46.3 of Road Act, driving by vehicles that carry dangerous goods are either prohibited or limited strictly.

== Pedestrian tunnel ==
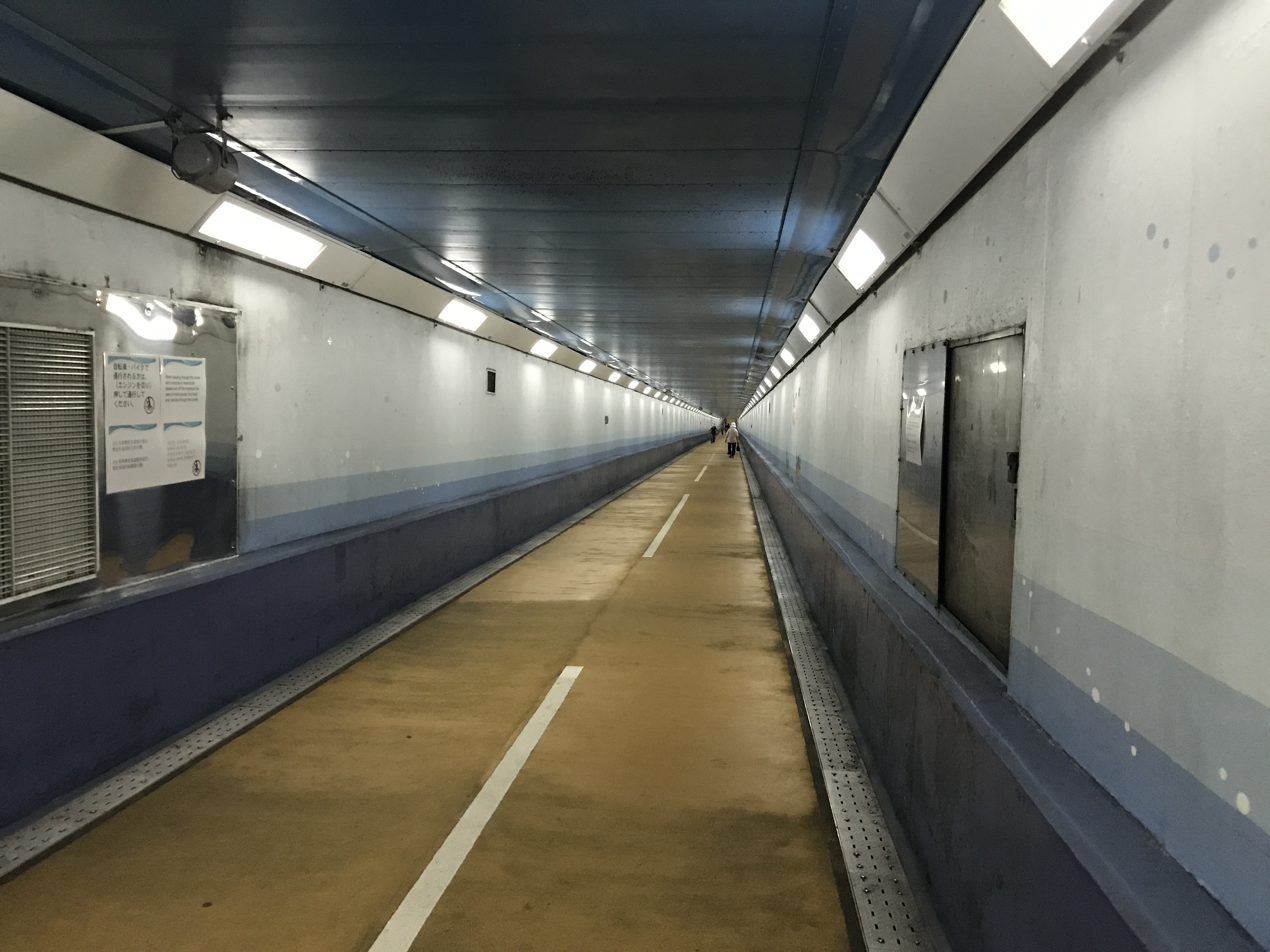
Kanmon pedestrian tunnel

A separate pedestrian passage exists, built directly underneath the roadway tunnel. Due to the advantage of having elevators on either side, the pedestrian segment is only 780 metres (2,560 ft) long, allowing one to walk under the strait between Honshu and Kyushu in 15 to 20 minutes. As of 2024, the tunnel is free to use for pedestrians and ¥20 for bicycles and motorbikes which must be dismounted and pushed through the tunnel.

== Coordinates ==
- Shimonoseki entrance for cars: 33°58′30″N 130°56′51″E
- Shimonoseki entrance for pedestrians and bicycles: 33°57′55″N 130°57′22″E
- Moji entrance for cars: 33°57′05″N 130°58′08″E
- Moji entrance for pedestrians and bicycles: 33°57′41″N 130°57′47″E

== See also ==
- Kanmon Bridge
- Kanmon Rail Tunnel
