= Talsinki =

Colloquial name for geographical region of Helsinki and Tallinn

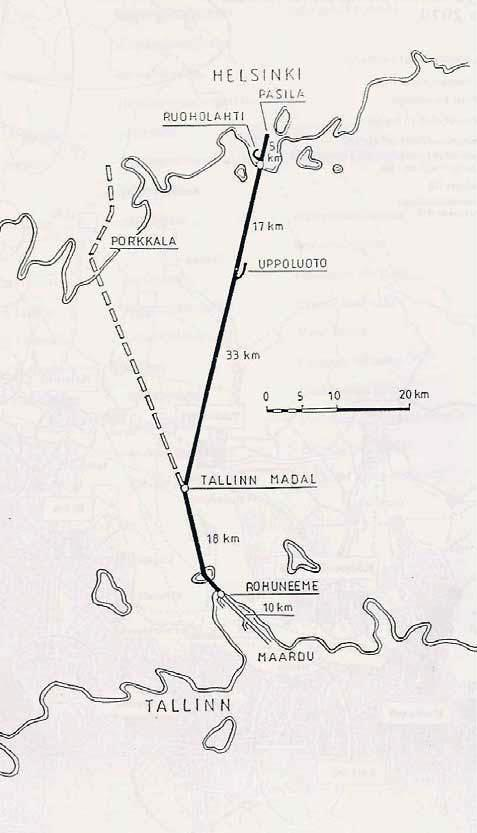
A map of the assessed tunnel routes between Tallinn and Helsinki

Talsinki (sometimes also Hellinna or Hellinn) is a colloquial name for the geographical region of Helsinki, Finland, and Tallinn, Estonia, separated by the Gulf of Finland, commonly used when referring to the proposed Helsinki–Tallinn Tunnel. The official Euroregion name for the region is Helsinki–Tallinn Euregion.

== See also ==
- Helsinki–Tallinn Tunnel
- Estonian–Finnish federation
