= Shin-Kanmon Tunnel =

Undersea tunnel in Kanmon Straits, Japan

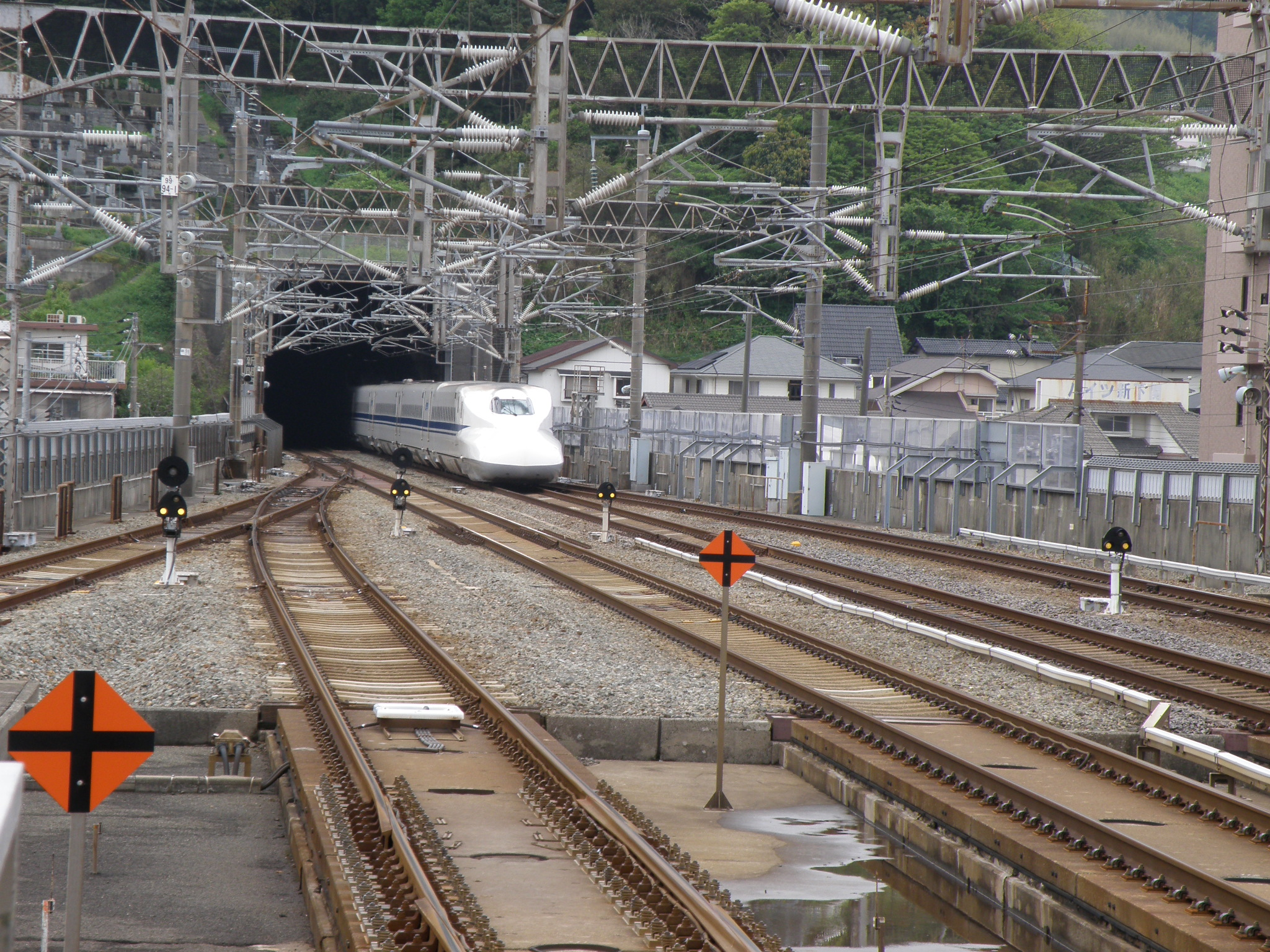
- Tunnel entrance near Shin-Shimonoseki Station
- Interactive map of Shin-Kanmon Tunnel

Overview
- Line: Sanyō Shinkansen
- Location: Honshu–Kyushu
- Coordinates: 33°57′57.4″N 130°57′47.2″E

Operation
- Opened: 10 March 1975
- Owner: JR West
- Operator: JR West
- Character: Passenger

Technical
- Line length: 18.713 km (11.628 mi)
- No. of tracks: 2
- Track gauge: 1,435 mm (4 ft 8 1/2 in) standard gauge
- Operating speed: 300 km/h (185 mph)

The Shin-Kanmon Tunnel (Japanese: 新関門トンネル) is a 18.713-kilometre-long (11.628 mi) undersea railway tunnel under the Kanmon Straits connecting Shin-Shimonoseki Station on the Japanese island of Honshu and Kokura Station on Kyushu. At the time of opening in March 1975, it was the longest railway tunnel in Japan before being overtaken by in 1988 the opening of the Seikan Tunnel.

== Overview ==
- Starting point: Ichinomiya Gakuencho, Shimonoseki City, Yamaguchi Prefecture
- End point: 2-chome, Shimotomino, Kokurakita-ku, Kitakyūshū, Fukuoka
- Overall length: 18,713 metres (11.628 miles)
- Undersea bed section: 880 metres (960 yd)
- Below sea level section: 66 metres (72 yd)
- Tunnel gradient: 18/1000
- Track gauge: 1,435 mm
- Electrification: 25 kV AC, 60 Hz, overhead catenary

The construction of the new tunnel started as a project to connect Honshu and Kyushu with a high-speed railway. The tunnel was constructed at the shortest section in the Kanmon Strait between Dannoura, Shimonoseki City - Mekari, Mojiku, Kitakyushu. Although the entire Shin-Kanmon Tunnel is 5 times longer, the undersea section is shorter than the conventional line Kanmon Tunnel (the Kanmon Tunnel undersea bed section is 1,140-metre (1,250 yd) long).

There is a 1,000 km (620-mile) distance marker about 1.8 km (1.1 miles) from the middle point of the tunnel. This is the only 1000 km railway marker in Japan.

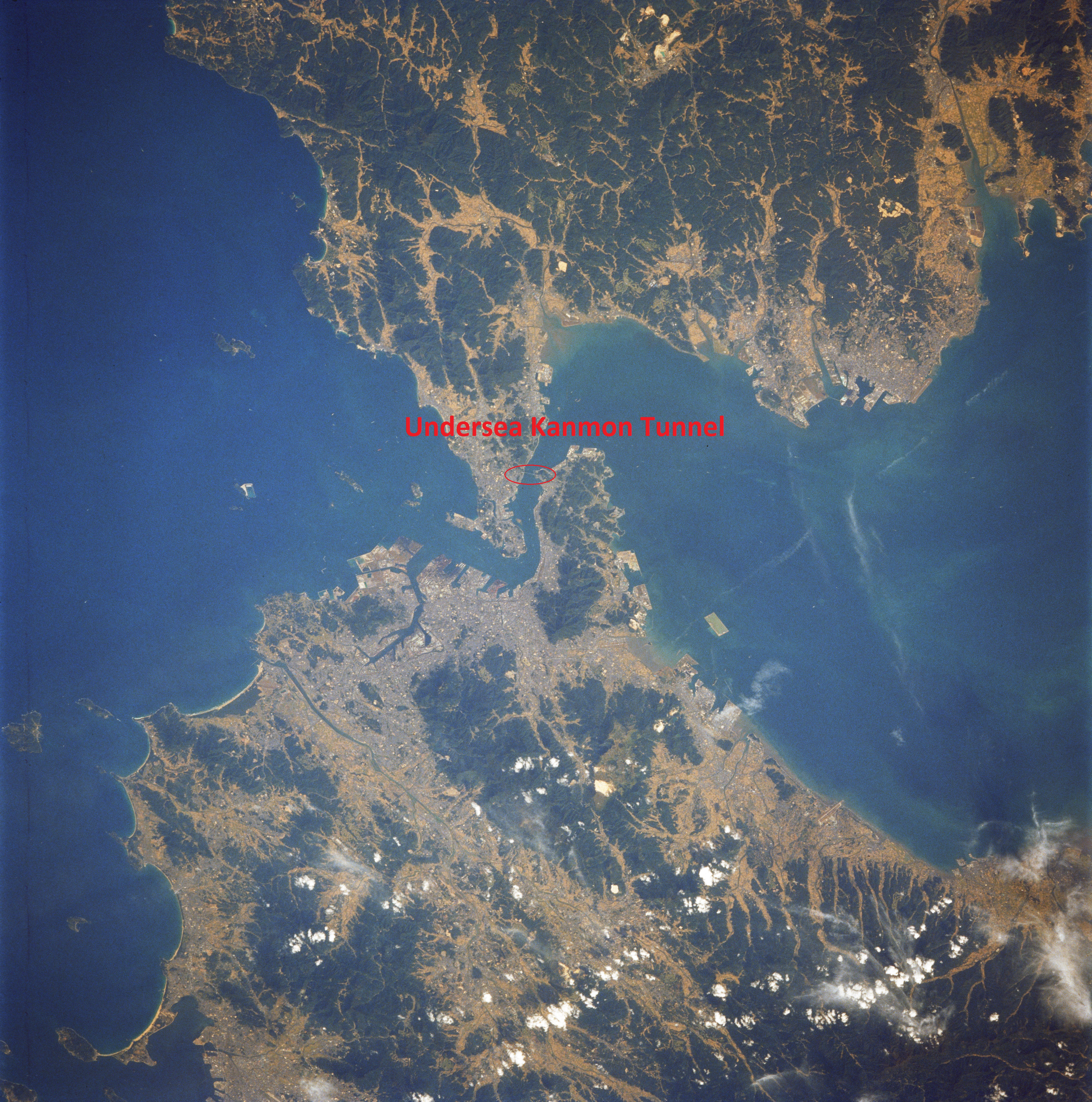
Undersea Kanmon Tunnel between Honshu and Kyushu islands in Japan

== Coordinates ==
- Shimonoseki entrance: 34°00′11″N 130°56′53″E
- Moji entrance: 33°52′58″N 130°53′55″E
