= Kanmon Straits =

Stretch of water separating Honshu and Kyushu in Japan

- Straits of Shimonoseki; Straits of Van der Capellen
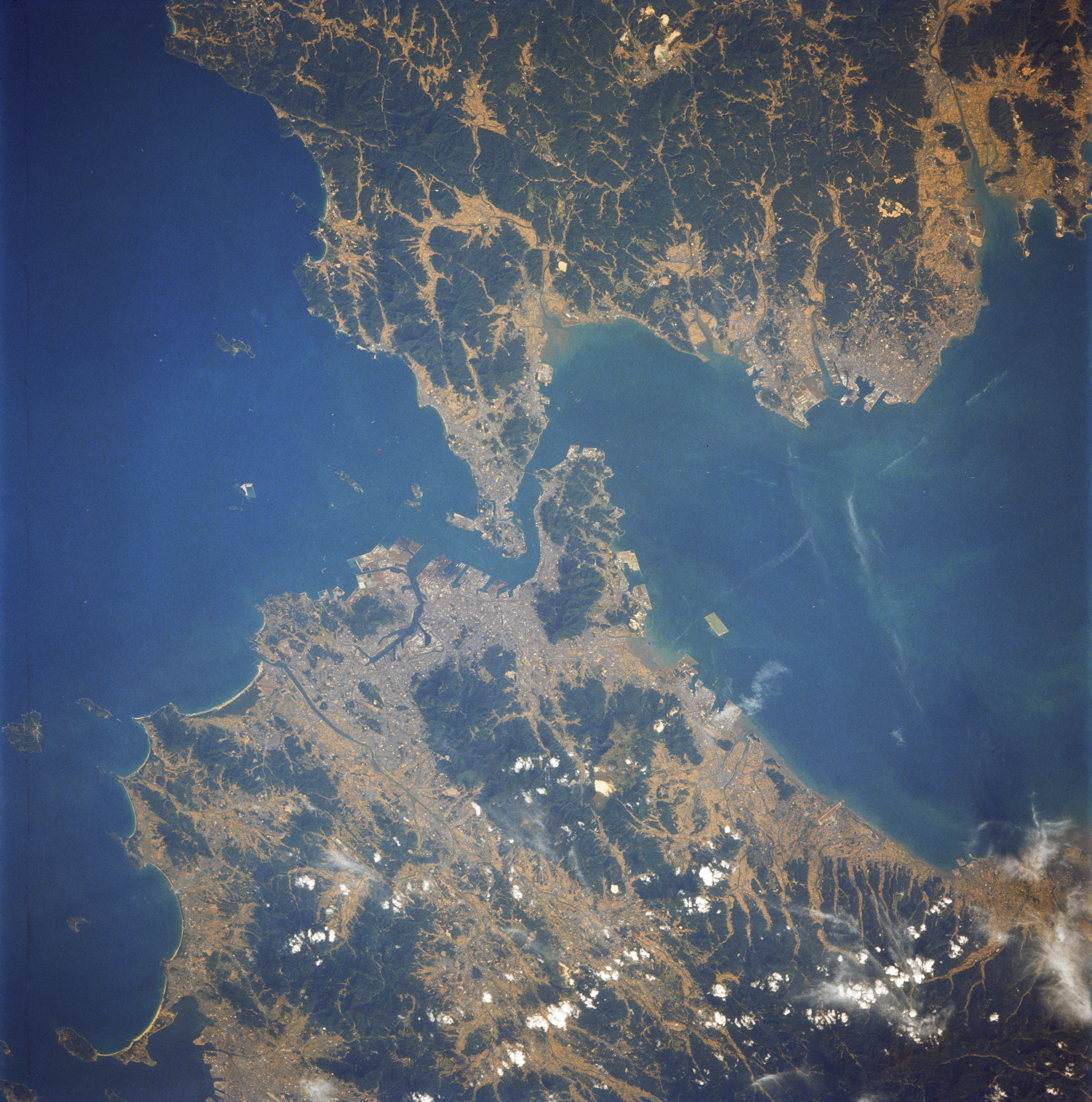
- Kanmon Straits viewed from space and rotated 90°, with Honshu at the top and Kyushu at the bottom

- Location within Japan Location within Fukuoka Prefecture Location within Kitakyushu
- Coordinates: 33°56′49″N 130°56′48″E
- Type: Strait
- Islands: Honshu; Kyushu

The Kanmon Straits (関門海峡, Kanmon-kaikyō) or the Straits of Shimonoseki is the stretch of water separating Honshu and Kyushu, two of Japan's four main islands. On the Honshu side of the strait is Shimonoseki (下関, which contributed "Kan" (関) to the name of the strait) and on the Kyushu side is Kitakyushu, whose former city and present ward, Moji (門司), gave the strait its "mon" (門). The straits silt up at the rate of about 15 centimetres per annum, and dredging has made it possible to build the Kitakyushu Airport at low cost.

Western maps from the 19th century also refer to this waterway as the Straits of Van der Capellen.

== Geographic description ==
The Kanmon Straits are 2.2 km wide at the eastern entrance, and 3 km wide at their western entrance. They are 18 km long. For most of their length they are 1 km wide, widening out at each end.

== Population of Kanmon area ==
Kanmon Straits as seen from the north. Taken from Mount Hinoyama (ja).

The total population of the Kanmon area is about 1.2 million, counting the whole of Kitakyushu (approx. 900,000) and Shimonoseki (approx. 300,000), although detailed definitions vary widely (see Fukuoka–Kitakyushu).

== Tourism ==
- Fireworks festival

The Kanmon Kaikyo Fireworks Festival is held in August every year.

- Boat rides

The Voyager pleasure boat departs from Moji-kō and cruises the straits.

- Helicopter and airship flights

Helicopter joyrides are available from Kaikyo Dramaship in Moji-kō. In October 2005, one of the world's largest airships currently flying (a Zeppelin NT imported from Germany) also passed through Moji on an all-Japan tour. This airship was purchased by Nippon Airship Corporation in June 2004 and was used in the Tokyo area and at the Aichi Expo 2005.

== Transportation ==
The Kanmon Straits can be crossed in a number of ways, the oldest of which are the ferries. There is a car ferry between Nishiminato (Kokura) and Hikinoshima (Shimonoseki) which takes about ten minutes, and a passenger ferry from Moji-ko to Shimonoseki (Karato wharf). There is also a bridge which carries an expressway. By far the most used method is a number of Kanmon Tunnels which carry the Sanyō Shinkansen, trains, cars, and even one for pedestrians at the narrowest point.

The first railway tunnel was opened on November 15, 1942. The highway tunnel was opened on March 9, 1958. The Kanmonkyo Bridge (see photo) was opened to vehicles on November 14, 1973. The Shinkansen tunnel was opened on March 10, 1975.

The New Kitakyushu Airport opened in Kitakyushu on March 16, 2006, and is expected to bring further prosperity in the form of increased tourism and trade to the area.

Ferries from Shimonoseki Port International Terminal:

- The Kanpu ferry to Busan in South Korea
- The Orient ferry to Qingdao in China
- The Orient ferry to Shanghai in China

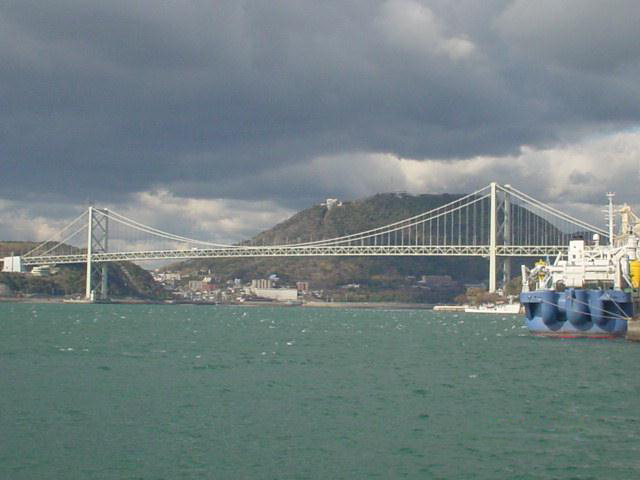
Kanmonkyo Bridge from the Moji side

== Commercial importance ==
The Kanmon straits is also the connection between the Sea of Japan and the Inland Sea. It is used by many cargo ships as a shortcut to Osaka and Tokyo from Korea and China. The New Kitakyushu Airport is also nearby.

== Historical significance ==
- Battle of Dan-no-ura
- Battle of Shimonoseki Straits
- Bombardment of Shimonoseki
- Treaty of Shimonoseki

== See also ==
- Geological formation of the Japanese Islands
- Mekari Shrine
