= Kanmon Railway Tunnel =

Undersea tunnel in Kanmon Straits, Japan

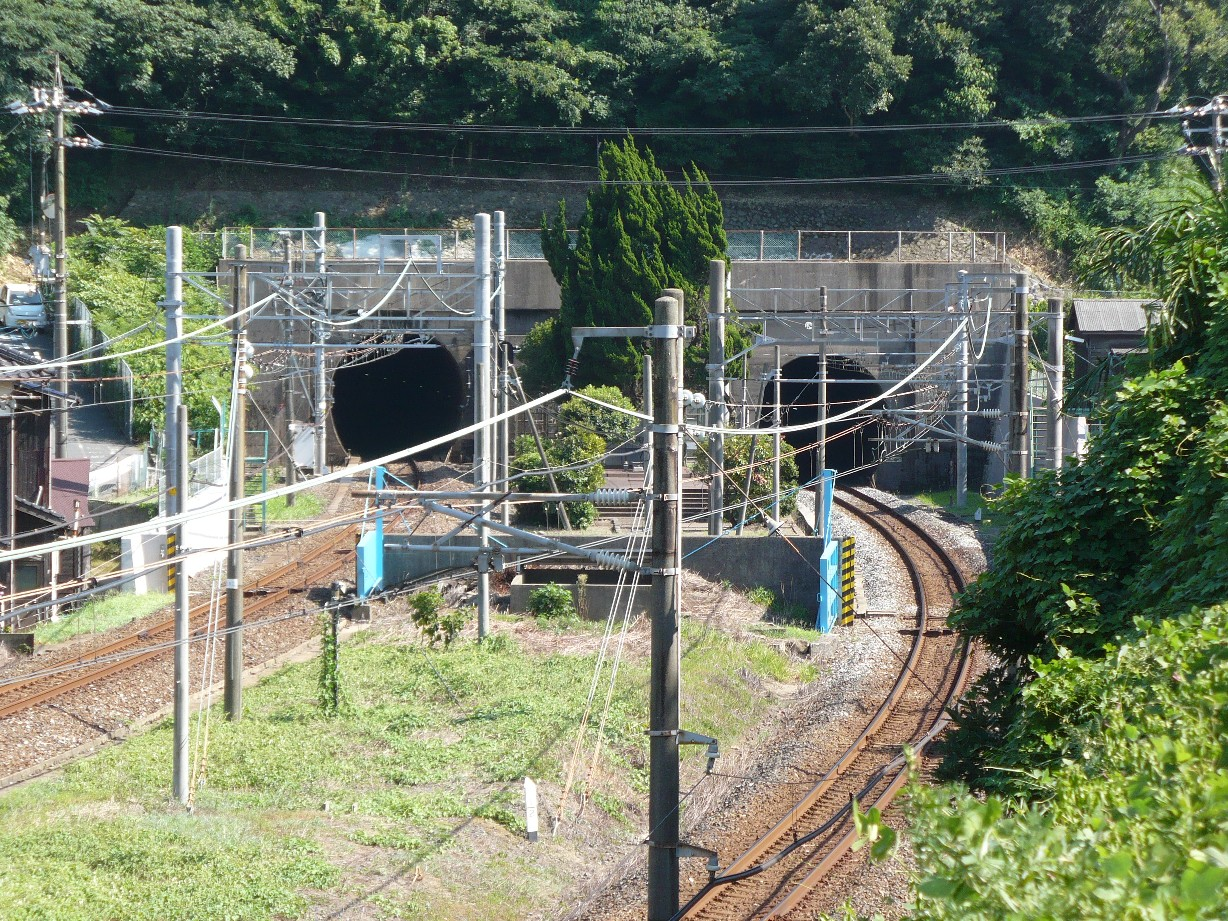
- Interactive map of Kanmon Railway Tunnel

Overview
- Line: San'yō Main Line
- Location: Honshu–Kyushu, Japan
- Coordinates: 33°55′18.4″N 130°55′58.2″E

Operation
- Opened: 1942
- Operator: JR Kyushu
- Character: Passenger and freight

Technical
- Line length: 3,604 m (11,824 ft)/ 3,614 m (11,857 ft)
- No. of tracks: 2
- Track gauge: 1,067 mm (3 ft 6 in)
- Electrified: Overhead line, 1,500 V DC

The Kanmon Railway Tunnel (関門鉄道トンネル, kanmon tetsudō tonneru) was the first undersea tunnel in Japan. It goes underneath the Kanmon Straits, connecting the islands of Honshu and Kyushu. It is an important link in the Japanese rail network. Its construction began in 1936, and it was completed in November 1942, during the Pacific War. The Honshu-bound tunnel is 3,604 m (11,824 ft) long, the Kyushu-bound tunnel is 3,614 m (11,857 ft). Track gauge is 1,067 mm (3 ft 6 in) and its electric power supply is at 1,500 V DC.

Near the end of the Pacific War the Allies planned to blow up the two tunnels with 50,000 pounds (23,000 kg) of explosives as part of the invasion of Japan. The Office of Strategic Services trained 250 of its agents for the task, but the surrender of Japan occurred before they were needed.

The Kyushu Railway Company (JR Kyushu) assumed ownership of this tunnel following the breakup of the Japanese National Railways system in 1987.

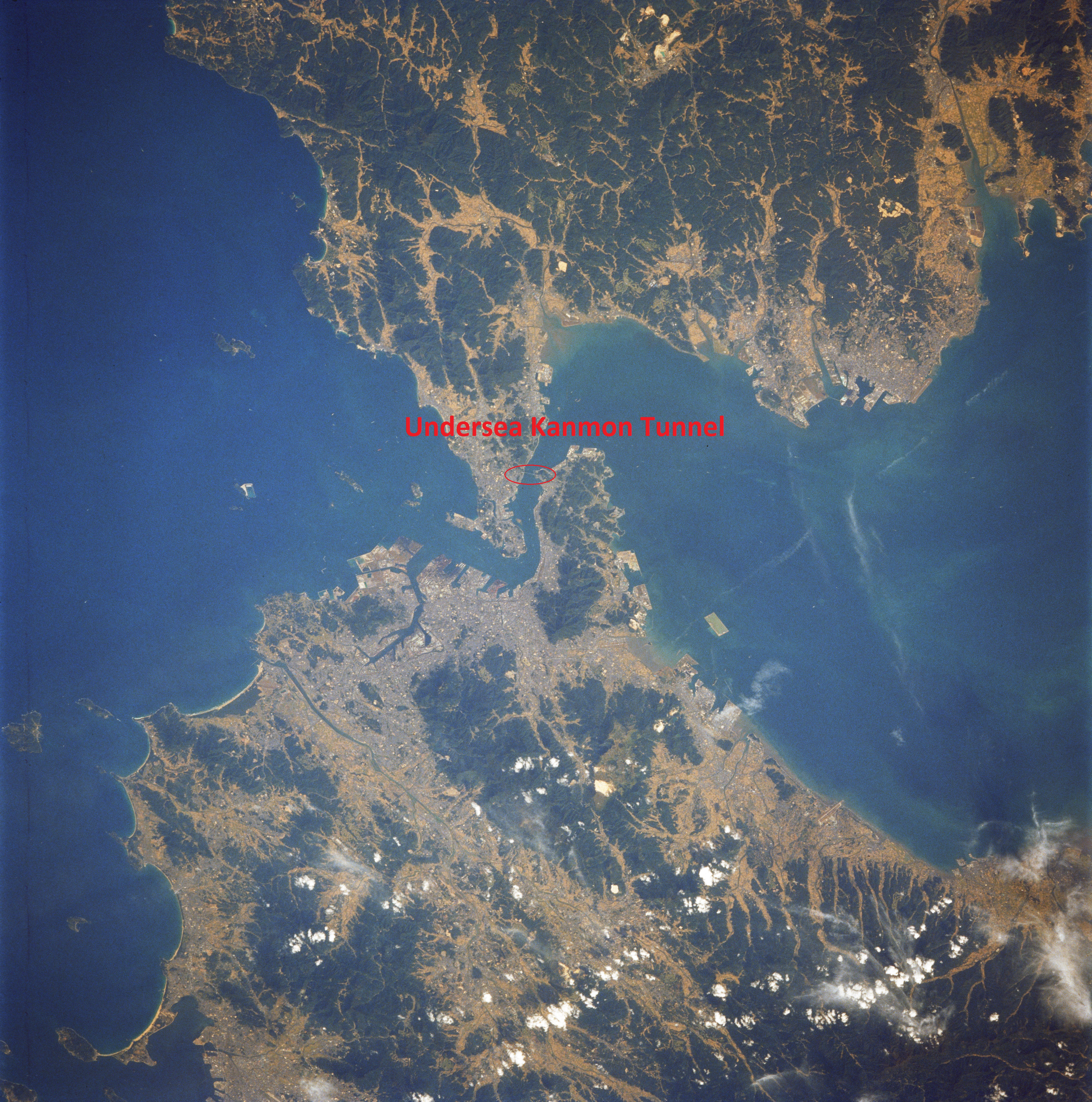
Undersea Kanmon Tunnel between Honshu and Kyushu islands in Japan

== Coordinates ==
- Shimonoseki entrance: 33°56′03″N 130°55′00″E
- Moji entrance: 33°54′37″N 130°56′11″E

== See also ==
- Shin-Kanmon Tunnel for the high-speed railway
- Kanmon Road Tunnel
