= Kanmon Bridge =

Suspension bridge across Kanmon Straits, Japan

Coordinates: 33°57′43″N 130°57′30″E

Route sign

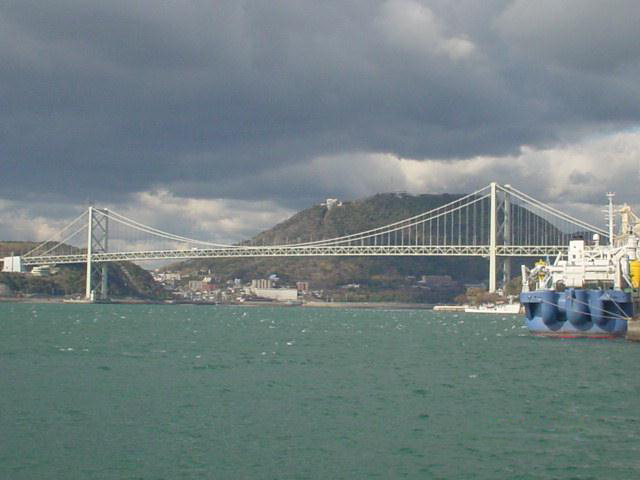
Kanmon Bridge from the Moji side

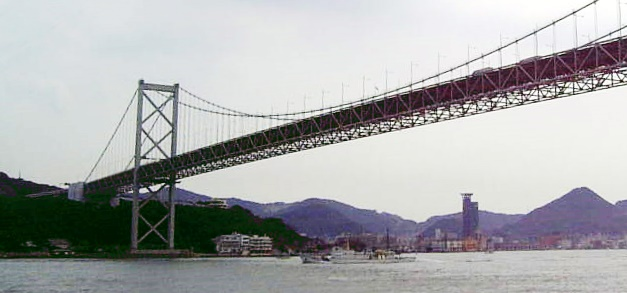
Bridge view

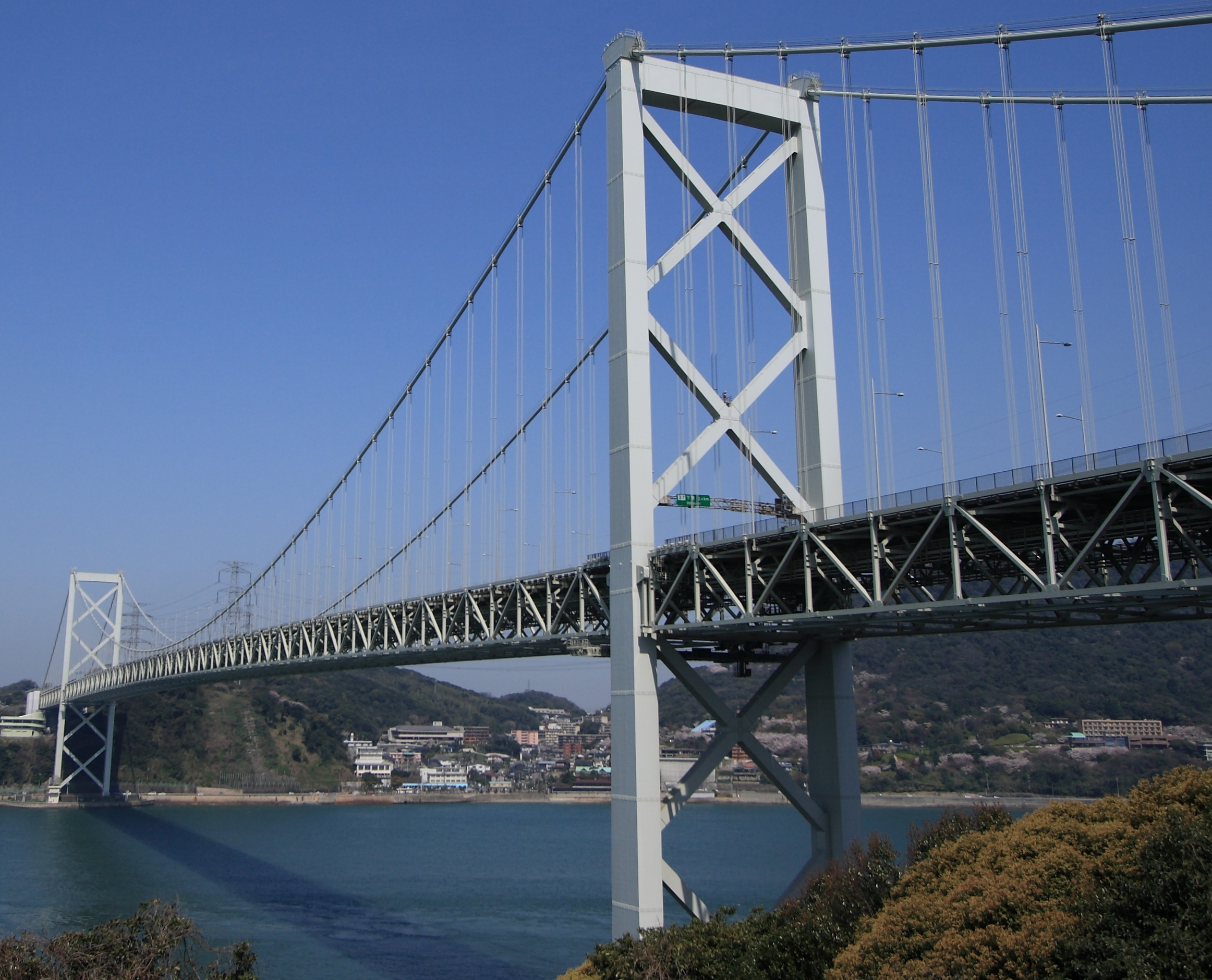
View of main span

The Kanmon Bridge (関門橋, Kanmonkyō) (Asian Highway Network AH1) is a suspension bridge crossing the Kanmon Straits, a stretch of water separating two of Japan's four main islands. On the Honshū side of the bridge is Shimonoseki (下関, which contributed Kan to the name of the strait) and on the Kyūshū side is Kitakyushu, whose former city and present ward, Moji (門司), gave the strait its mon.

Construction began in 1968 and was completed in 1973. The Kanmon Bridge was opened to vehicles on November 14, 1973 and connected to the Kyūshū Expressway on March 27, 1984. It is among the 50 largest suspension bridges in the world with a central length of 1,068 metres (3,504 feet).

== See also ==
- Kanmon Tunnel
