= Akashi Castle =

Japanese castle

- 明石城
- Akashi, Hyōgo Prefecture, Japan
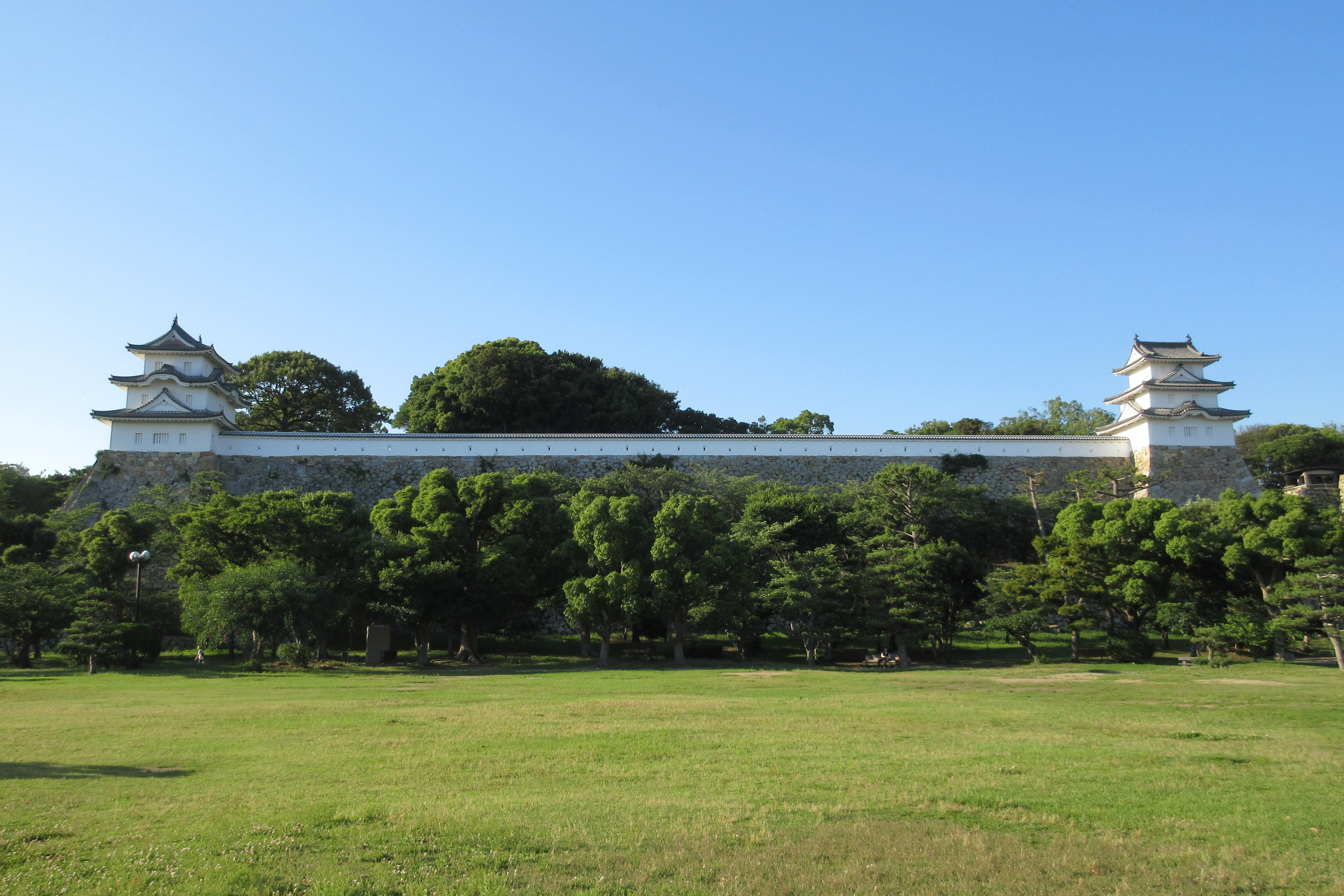
- Tatsumi Yagura(r) and Hitsujisaru Yagura(l)

Site information
- Type: flatland-style Japanese castle
- Condition: Ruins, save two yagura and a connecting wall

Location
- Coordinates: 34°39′09″N 134°59′30″E

Site history
- Built: 1617 to 1619
- Built by: Ogasawara Tadazane
- Demolished: 1874
- National Historic Site of Japan Important Cultural Properties of Japan

Akashi Castle (明石城, Akashi-jō) is an Edo period Japanese castle located in the city of Akashi, Hyōgo Prefecture, Japan. It was also known as Kiharu Castle (喜春城, Kiharu-jō) or Kinkō Castle (錦江城, Kinkō-jō). Its ruins have been protected as a National Historic Site since 1957.

== History ==
Akashi Castle is located on Mount Akamatsu, a hill in central Akashi, to the north of Akashi Station. The site was the location of a burial mound which was believed to have been the grave of the Nara period poet Kakinomoto no Hitomaro. The location dominates the San'yōdō highway connecting the Kinai region with western Japan and also the main route north to Tanba and Tango Provinces. It is also very near the coast of the Seto Inland Sea, overlooking the narrows to Awaji island. Considered by the Tokugawa shogunate to be a backup to Himeji Castle, it was the final line of defences for the Kansai region against any attack from the west.

The construction of the castle was by order of Shogun Tokugawa Hidetada from 1617 to 1619, who had assigned Ogasawara Tadazane to the area as daimyō of the newly created 100,000 koku Akashi Domain. Ogasawara Tadazane's father Ogasawara Hidemasa had married a granddaughter of Tokugawa Ieyasu and was daimyō of Matsumoto Domain. He was killed in action at the Siege of Osaka. It is claimed without clear documentary evidence that Miyamoto Musashi assisted in building the castle as a "Construction Supervisor", as it is recorded that he was in the service of Ogasawara Tadazane at the time.

The castle only took one year to complete, which was relatively fast for the time period. This was done so quickly as a result of the 1615 decree mandating castle per clan, so many castles in the area were dismantled and some materials and buildings were recycled for the construction of Akashi Castle. This included wood from Miki Castle, Takasago Castle, Edayoshi Castle, and Funage Castle and a number of buildings from Fushimi Castle and Funage Castle including yagura towers. Although no tenshu main tower was ever built, Akashi Castle became a large castle with 20 yagura and 27 gates. The Inner bailey had four three-story corner yagura, two of which have survived to the present.

The Ogawasawa clan were transferred to Kokura Domain in 1632, and afterwards the castle was ruled by a succession of fudai daimyō or shimpan clans. Akashi Castle underwent major repairs in 1739, and was largely demolished by the Meiji Government in 1874. The castle site became the Hyogo Prefectural Akashi Park. The castle suffered considerable damage in the 1995 Great Hanshin Earthquake, with some collapsed stone walls and extensive damage to its yagura towers.

Akashi Castle was listed as one of Japan's Top 100 Castles by the Japan Castle Foundation in 2006.

The castle is a ten-minute walk from Akashi Station on the JR West San'yō Main Line.

== Gallery ==
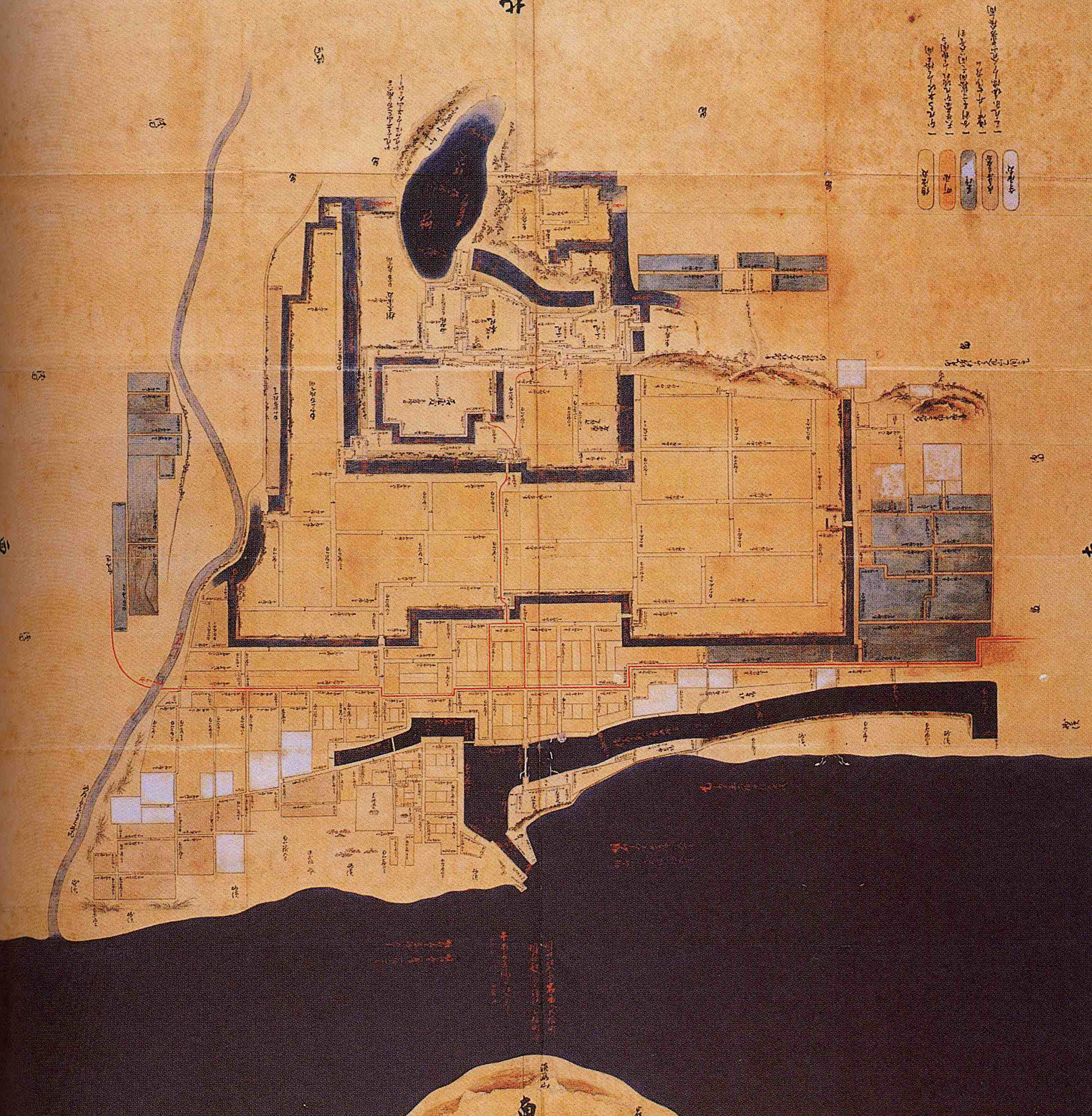
Layout map

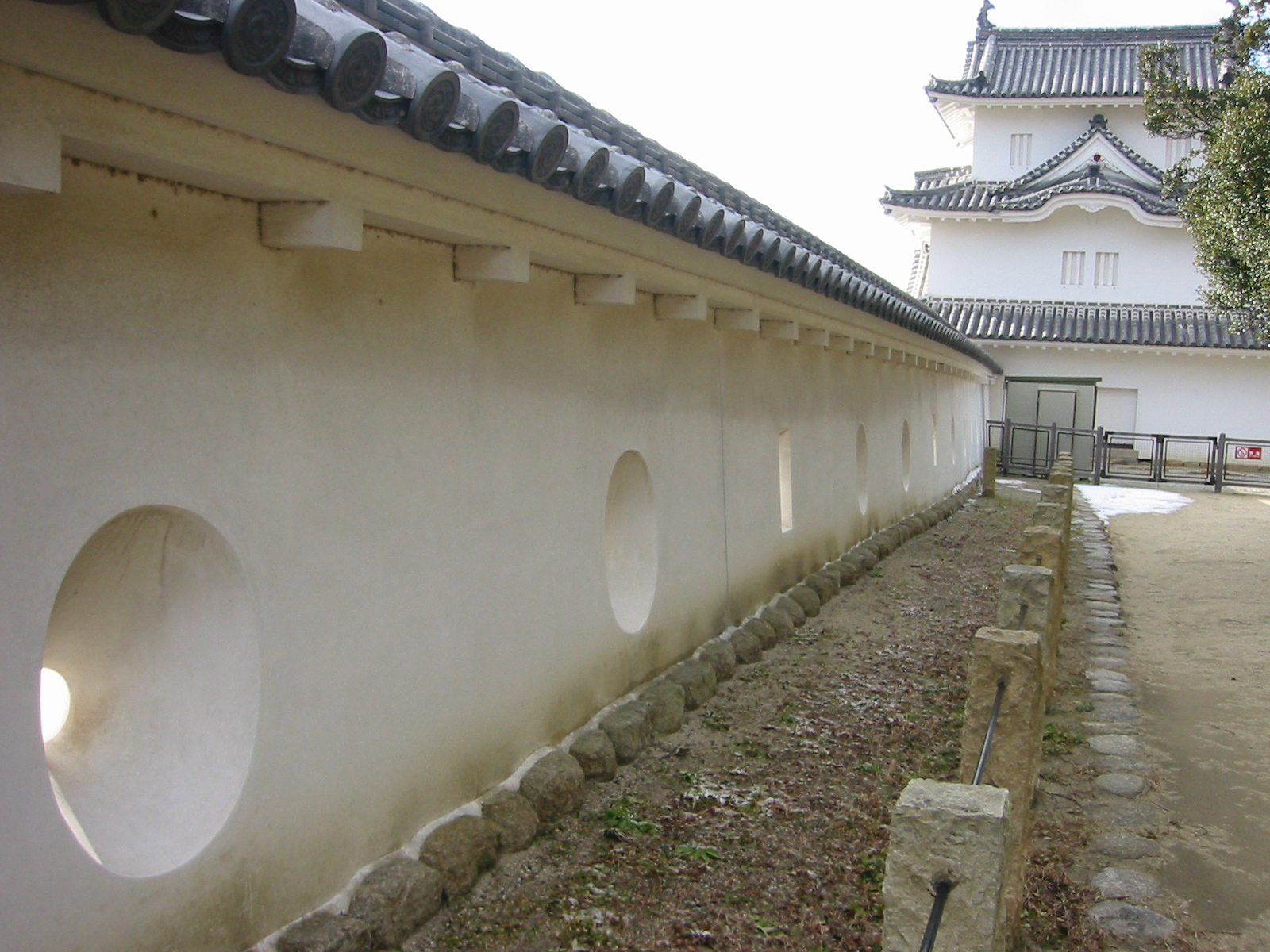
Section of wall and the Hitsujisaru Yagura

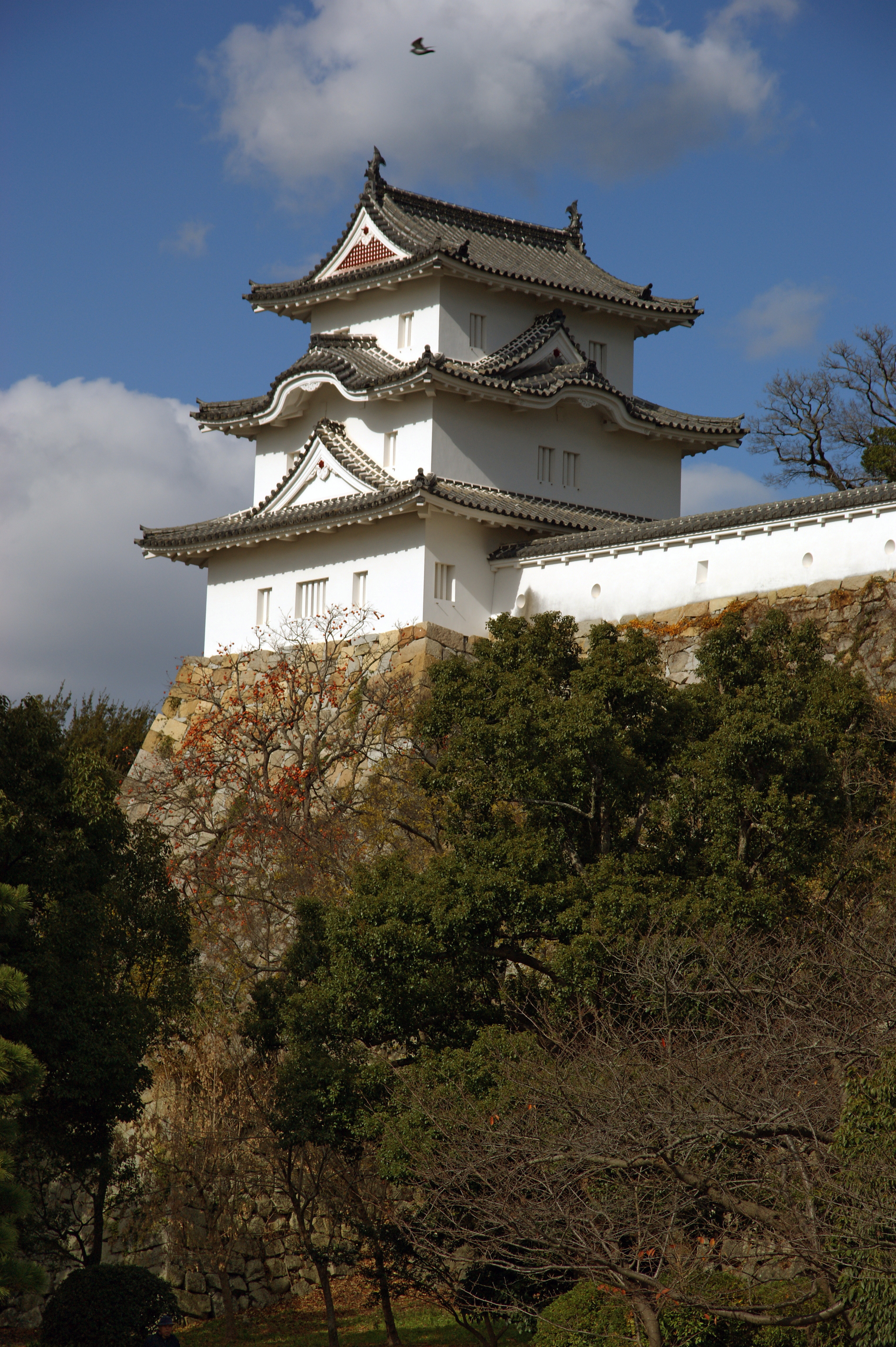
Tatsumi Yagura

== Cultural properties ==
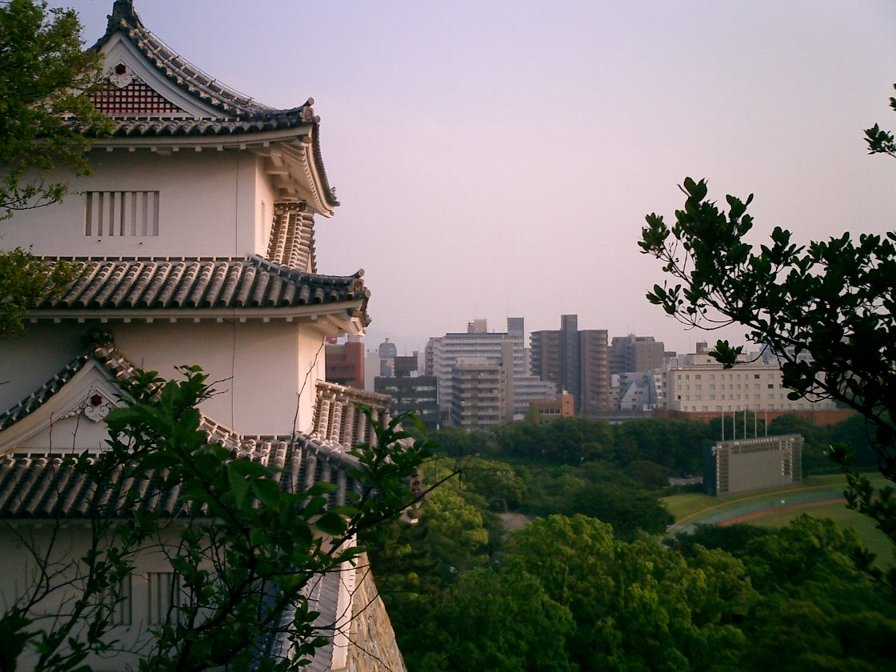
Hitsujisaru yagura and Central Akashi city.

The two remaining yagura towers of Akashi Castle have been designated Important Cultural Properties:

- Hitsujisaru Yagura (坤櫓)
- Tatsumi Yagura (巽櫓)

== See also ==
- List of Historic Sites of Japan (Hyōgo)
