= Kitsuki Domain =

Administrative division in Japan during the Edo period (1632–1871)

Kitsuki Domain 杵築藩
- Domain of Japan
- 1632–1871
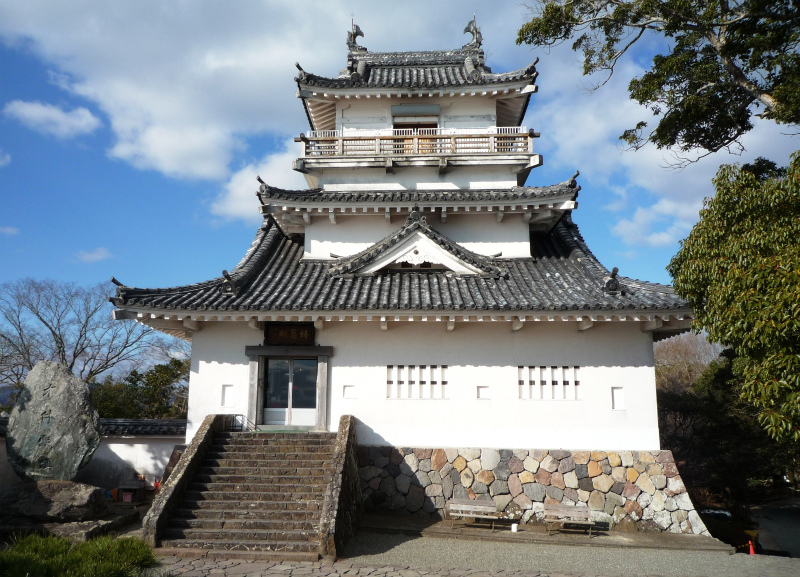
- Kitsuki Castle

- Mon of the Nomi-Matsudaira clan
- Capital: Kitsuki Castle
- Area
  - Coordinates: 33°24′53.09″N 131°37′39.6″E
- Historical era: Edo period
  - Established: 1632
  - Abolition of the han system: 1871
- Contained within
  - Province: Bungo Province
- Today part of: Oita Prefecture

Location of Kitsuki Castle
Kitsuki Domain (Japan)

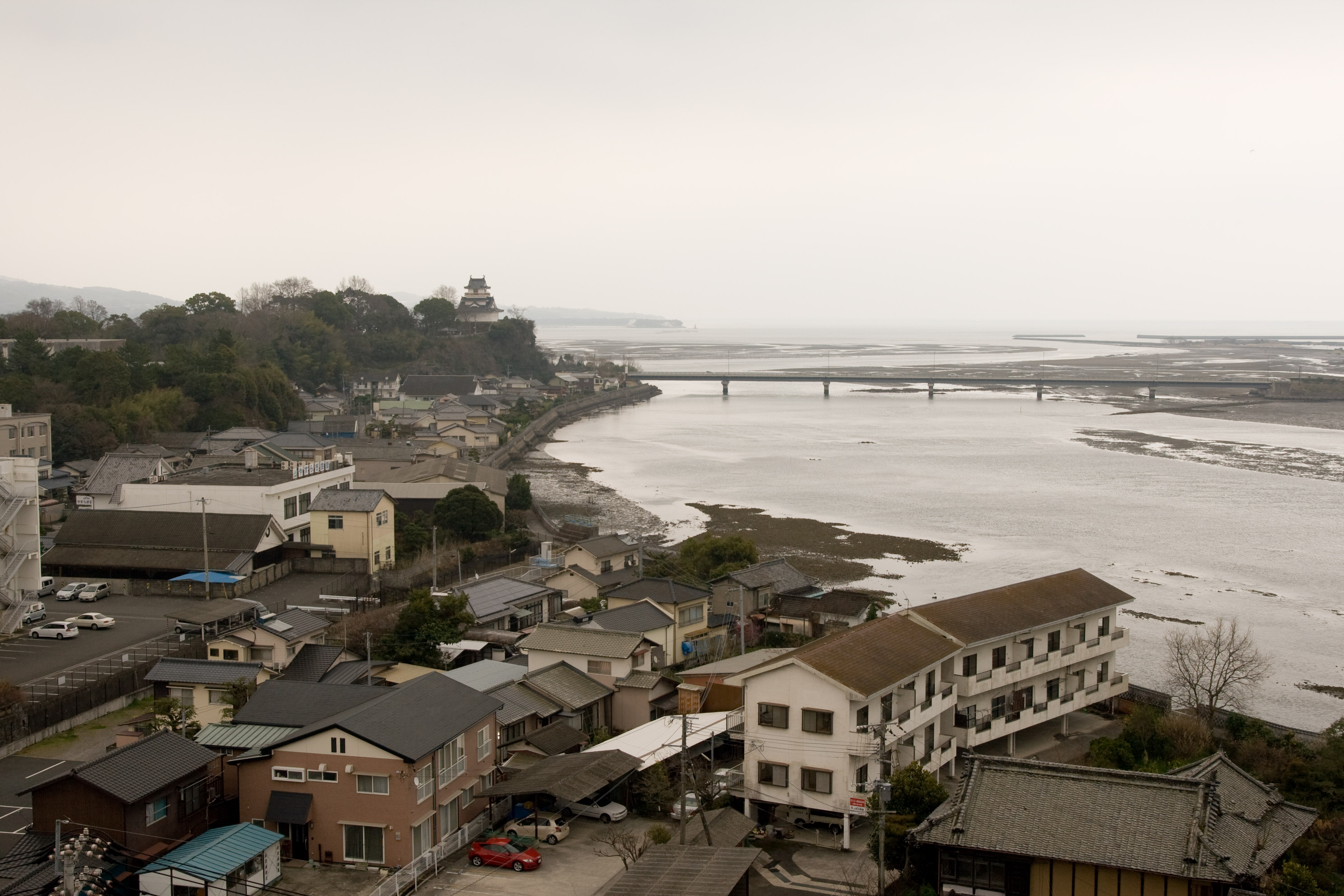
Castle town of Kitsuki

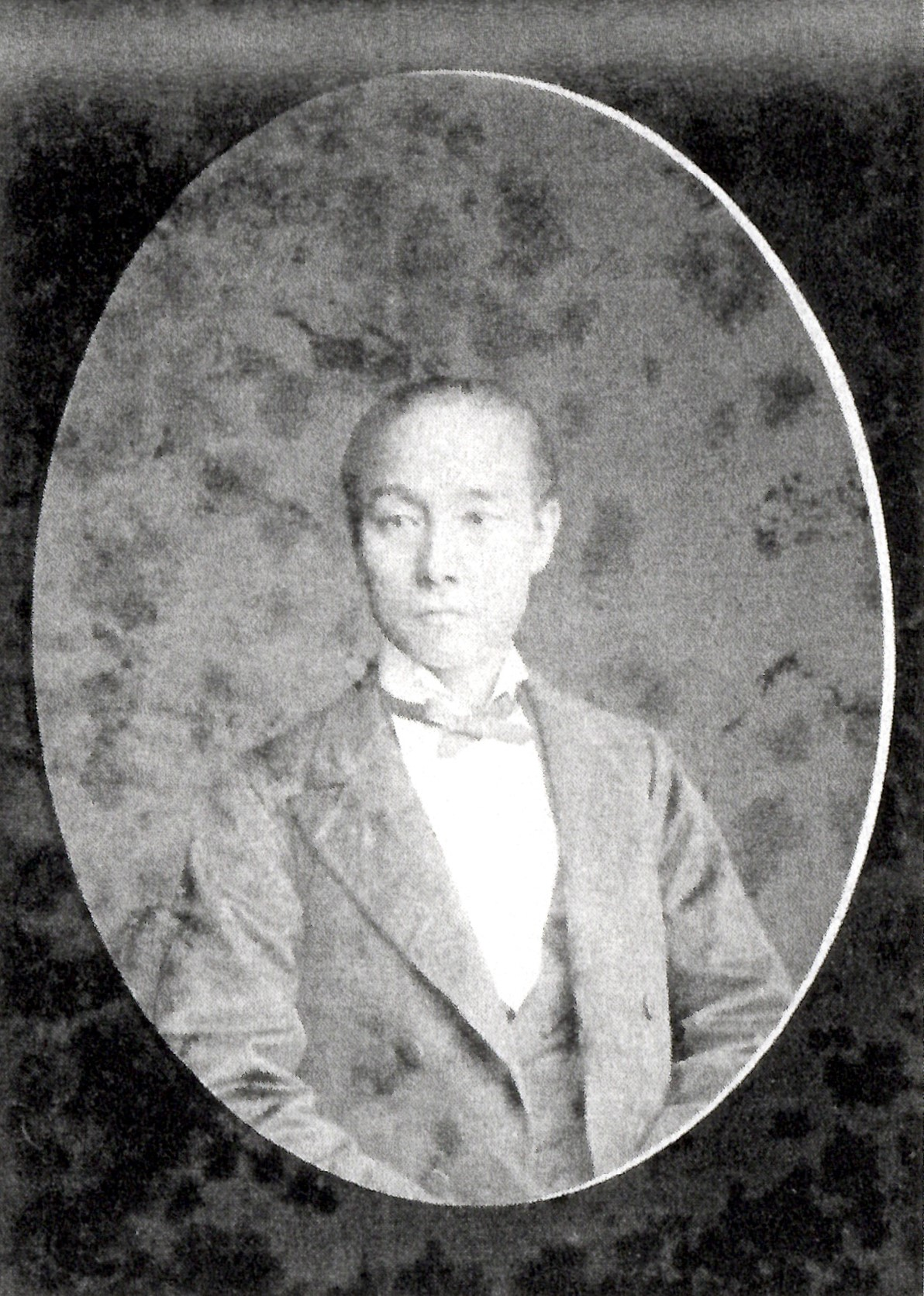
Matsudaira Chikataka, final daimyō of Kitsuki

Kitsuki Domain (杵築藩, Kitsuki-han) was a feudal domain under the Tokugawa shogunate of Edo period Japan, in what is now northern Ōita Prefecture. It was centered around Kitsuki Castle in what is now the city of Kitsuki and was ruled by the fudai daimyō Nomi-Matsudaira clan for most of its history.

== History ==
Bungo Province was under the control of the Ōtomo clan from the Kamakura period to the Sengoku period, with the Kunisaki Peninsula controlled by the Kitsuki (木付), a cadet branch of the clan. Under the tenure of the Kirishitan warlord Ōtomo Sōrin, the Ōtomo clan invaded Hyūga Province but were defeated by the Shimazu clan in 1586, and were confined to Nyūjima Castle (the predecessor of Usuki Castle). The Ōtomo were saved by Toyotomi Hideyoshi's 1586–1587 Kyūshū campaign and were allowed to reclaim Bungo Province as their territory. However, Ōtomo Yoshimune (Sōrin's son) behaved in a cowardly manner during the Japanese invasions of Korea (1592–1598) which so angered Hideyoshi that he was deprived of his fief and was banished. Bungo was divided into small fiefs and the Kitsuki clan was likewise dispossessed. Their territory passed to Sugiwara Nagafusa, Hayakawa Nagamasa, and finally to Hosokawa Tadaoki in 1599, upon his move from the 120,000 koku fief of Miyazu, in Tango Province. For his distinguished service at the Battle of Sekigahara in 1600, Tadaoki was granted the entire Buzen Province, and moved his seat first to Nakatsu Castle, then to Kokura Castle. The Hosokawa remained in Buzen until 1632, when Tadaoki's son Hosokawa Tadatoshi was transferred to the Kumamoto Domain in neighboring Higo Province. The former Hosokawa territory was partitioned; Ogasawara Tadazane, who had ruled the Akashi Domain of Harima Province, was granted 150,000 koku of land in northern Buzen, with the territory's seat of government being placed at Kokura Castle. The secondary castle of Nakatsu became the center of the new Nakatsu Domain, which was granted to Tadazane's nephew Ogasawara Nagatsugu. Simultaneously, Tadazane's younger brother Ogasawara Tadatomo, who had been a hatamoto, was given Kitsuki Castle in Bungo and its surroundings with a kokudaka of 40,000 koku, making him a daimyō. Tadatomo was relocated to Yoshida Domain in Mikawa Province in 1645. Matsudaira Hidechika, the daimyō of Bungo-Takada Domain replaced Ogasawara Tadatomo, with the domain slightly reduced to 32,000 koku. His descendants ruled Kitsuki until the Meiji Restoration.

As flatland was scarce in Kitsuki, land reclamation and industrial arts were encouraged; Matsudaira Hidechika brought around 100 peasants with him from Mikawa; they formed what became commonly known as the Mikawa-shinden farmland. The domain's name spelling was changed in 1711 from [木付] to [杵築], during the tenure of the third daimyō, Matsudaira Shigeyasu. The domain's finances deteriorated due to the Kyōhō famine; Miura Baien, a scholar residing in the domain, was commissioned to solve the crisis. Among his reforms was the opening of the domain school, the Gakushūkan, in the Tenmei era (1781–1789).

In 1871, due to the abolition of the han system, Kitsuki Domain became Kitsuki Prefecture, and was later incorporated into Ōita Prefecture. The Nomi-Matsudaira clan was elevated to the kazoku peerage with the title of viscount in 1884.

== Holdings at the end of the Edo period ==
As with most domains in the han system, Kitsuki Domain consisted of several discontinuous territories calculated to provide the assigned kokudaka, based on periodic cadastral surveys and projected agricultural yields.

- Bungo Province
  - 87 villages in Kunisaki District
  - 42 villages in Hayami District

== List of daimyō ==
#	Name	Tenure	Courtesy title	Court Rank	kokudaka
Ogasawara clan, 1632–1645 (Fudai)
1	Ogasawara Tadatomo (小笠原忠知)	1632–1645	Iki-no-kami (壱岐守)	Junior 5th Rank, Lower Grade (従五位下)	40,000 koku
Nomi-Matsudaira clan, 1645–1871 (Tozama)
1	Matsudaira Hidechika (松平英親 )	1645–1692	Ichi-no-kami (市正)	Junior 5th Rank, Lower Grade (従五位下)	32,000 koku
2	Matsudaira Shigeyoshi (松平重栄)	1692–1708	Tango-no-kami (丹後守)	Junior 5th Rank, Lower Grade (従五位下)	32,000 koku
3	Matsudaira Shigeyasu (松平重休)	1708–1715	Buzen-no-kami (豊前守)	Junior 5th Rank, Lower Grade (従五位下)	32,000 koku
4	Matsudaira Chikazumi (松平親純)	1715–1739	Ichi-no-kami (市正)	Junior 5th Rank, Lower Grade (従五位下)	32,000 koku
5	Matsudaira Chikamitsu (松平親盈)	1739–1767	Tsushima-no-kami 対馬守)	Junior 5th Rank, Lower Grade (従五位下)	32,000 koku
6	Matsudaira Chikasada (松平親貞)	1767–1785	Chikugo-no-kami (筑後守)	Junior 5th Rank, Lower Grade (従五位下)	32,000 koku
7	Matsudaira Chikakata (松平親賢)	1785–1802	Suruga-no-kami (駿河守)	Junior 5th Rank, Lower Grade (従五位下)	32,000 koku
8	Matsudaira Chikaakira (松平親明)	1802–1825	Bitchū-no-kami (備中守)	Junior 5th Rank, Lower Grade (従五位下)	32,000 koku
9	Matsudaira Chikayoshi (松平親良)	1825–1868	Nakatsuka-no-taifu (中務大輔)	Junior 5th Rank, Lower Grade (従五位下)	32,000 koku
10	Matsudaira Chikataka (松平親貴)	1868–1871	Kawachi-no-kami (河内守)	Junior 5th Rank, Lower Grade (従五位下)	32,000 koku

== See also ==
- List of Han
- Abolition of the han system
