= Kitsuki Castle =

Castle ruins in Kitsuki, Ōita, Japan

- 杵築城
- Kitsuki, Ōita Japan
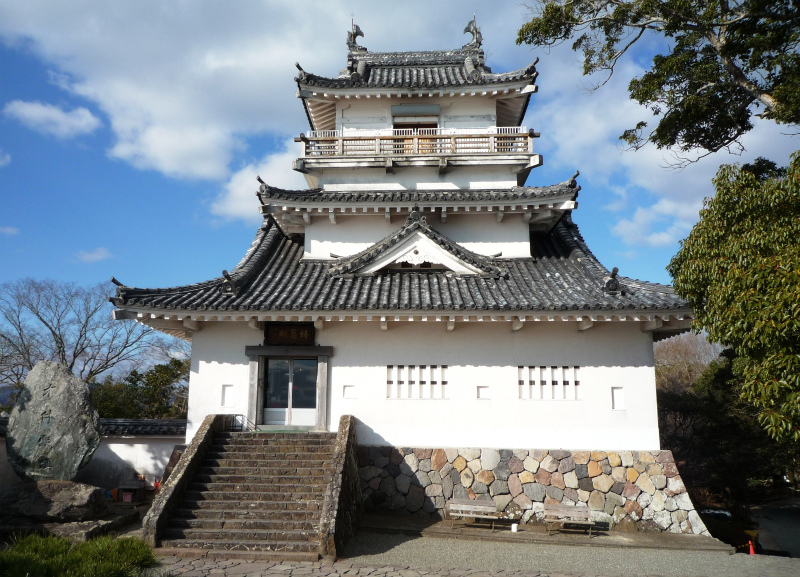
- Reconstructed Tenshu of Kitsuki Castle

Site information
- Type: yamajiro-style Japanese castle
- Controlled by: Matsudaira clan
- Open to the public: yes
- Condition: Archaeological and designated national historical site; castle ruins

Location
- Coordinates: 33°24′53.09″N 131°37′39.6″E

Site history
- Built: 1394
- Built by: Kitsuki Yorinao
- In use: Sengoku - Edo period
- National Historic Site of Japan

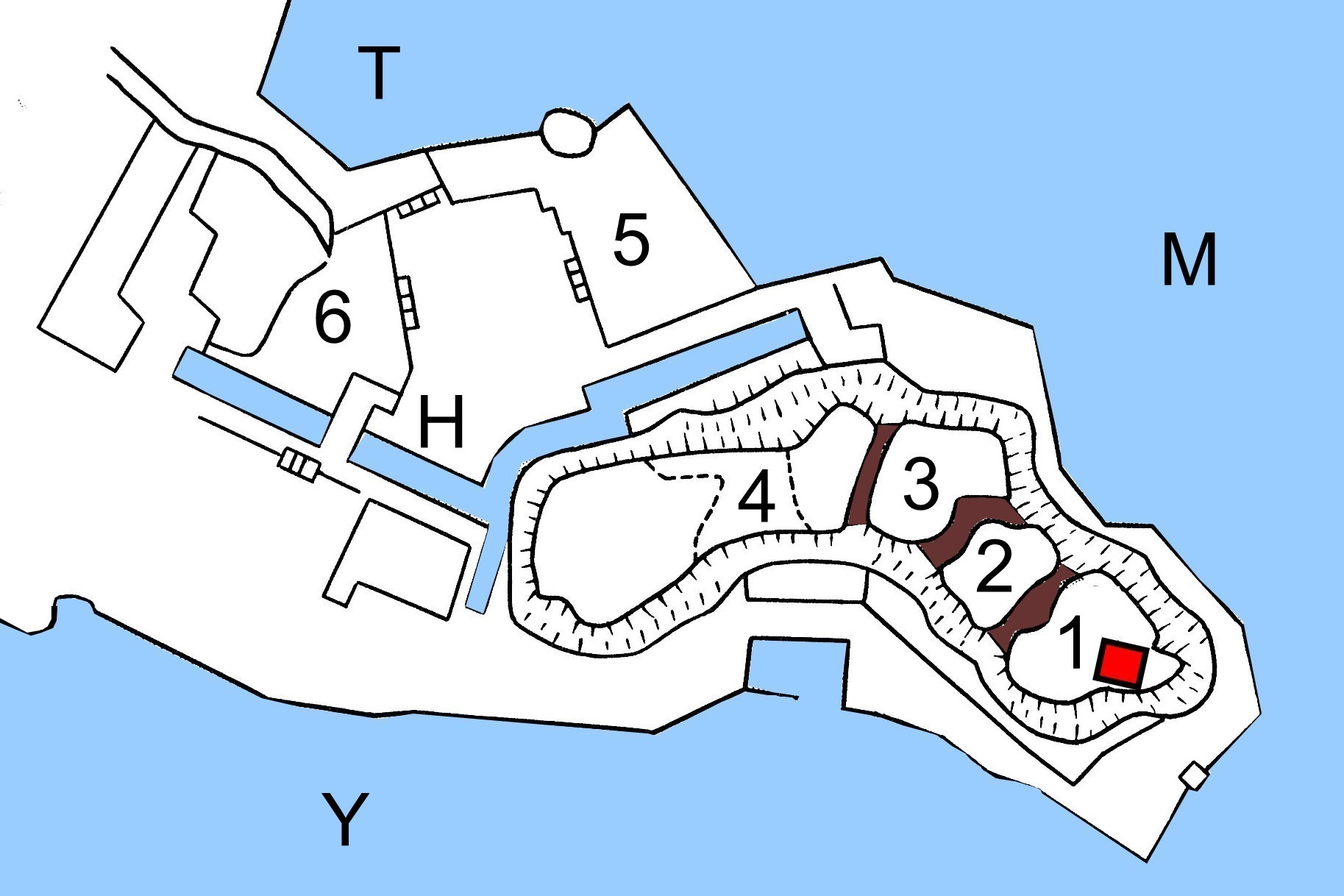
Kitsuki Castle layout

Kitsuki Castle (杵築城, Kitsuki-jō) is an Edo period yamajiro-style Japanese castle located in the city of Kitsuki, Ōita Prefecture, Japan. Its ruins have been protected as a National Historic Site since 2020. The current castle, a replica tenshu built in 1970, is considered to be the smallest castle in Japan.

== Overview ==
Kitsuki Castle is located on Shiroyama hill on the southern seashore of the Kunisaki Peninsula in Kyushu in what was once northern Bungo Province. The castle is situated on a long and narrow hill about 200 meters in length. Its elevation is only between 20 and 30 meters, but as the slopes of the hill are steep cliffs and the site was seen to be protected on either side by the Yasaka-gawa and Takayama-gawa rivers, the location was considered a natural fortress.

== History ==
The original castle was constructed at this location in 1394 by the Kitsuki clan, a cadet branch of the Ōtomo clan, who had been dispatched as shugo of the province by the Kamakura shogunate. Initially, the Kitsuki clan established their stronghold at Takeno Castle 10 kilometers upstream, but Kitsuki Yorinao relocated it to the coast and constructed a new jōkamachi to better control the port.

In the Sengoku period, Kitsuki Shigenao was an important retainer of Ōtomo Sōrin, who directly or indirectly controlled northern half of Kyushu. However, the Ōtomo were defeated by the aggressive Shimazu clan in a series of battles in Hyūga Province, losing most of the territory and many of their retainers, including their capital of Funai (modern-day Ōita city) in 1587. However, the Kitsuki clan withstood a two-month siege by Shimazu forces and remained in the hands of the Kitsuki clan until after Toyotomi Hideyoshi's conquest of Kyushu. The Ōtomo were restored to control of Bungo Province; however, Ōtomo Yoshimune was subsequently accused of cowardice during the Japanese invasions of Korea (1592–1598) and was dispossessed. At that time, the Kitsuki clan was dispossessed and its leaders killed themselves. Toyotomi Hideyoshi subsequent awarded the castle to Sugihara Nagafusa, a marriage relative of Hideyoshi, built hillside residence at the north of the hill. At the beginning of the Edo Period, the castle was maintained as a secondary fortification by Hosokawa Tadaoki, who was at the time the daimyō of Kokura Domain. In 1632, when Tadaoki's son Hosokawa Tadatoshi was transferred to the Kumamoto Domain in neighboring Higo Province. The former Hosokawa territory was partitioned; Ogasawara Tadazane, who had ruled the Akashi Domain of Harima Province, was granted 150,000 koku of land in northern Buzen, with the territory's seat of government being placed at Kokura Castle. The secondary castle of Nakatsu became the center of the new Nakatsu Domain, which was granted to Tadazane's nephew Ogasawara Nagatsugu. Simultaneously, Tadazane's younger brother Ogasawara Tadatomo, who had been a hatamoto, was given Kitsuki Castle and its surroundings with a kokudaka of 40,000 koku, making him a daimyō. Tadatomo was relocated to Yoshida Domain in Mikawa Province in 1645. Matsudaira Hidechika, the daimyō of Bungo-Takeda Domain replaced Ogasawara Tadatomo, with the domain slightly reduced to 32,000 koku. His descendants ruled Kitsuki until the Meiji Restoration.

In the Meiji period, all of the castle buildings were dismantled and hillside residence was turned into a local government office and school.

=== Present situation ===
A faux three-story re-creation of the tenshu was built out of reinforced concrete in 1970. Efforts have been made to preserve the period aesthetics of the current site. In order to do so, modern intrusions have been avoided, so electric cables and other modern intrusions have been kept out of sight. The reconstructed tenshu includes a museum inside. The daimyō palace at the foot of the mountain is located in the area of Kitsuki Shrine, the former Kitsuki Junior High School, and the former Kitsuki City Library. During archaeological excavations conducted in 2010, the remains of a moat, stone wall, and garden were discovered and the site was designated as a prefectural historic site on February 23, 2016. The general area of Kitsuki retains the look of a traditional castle town with a many surviving samurai houses guarded by stone walls and fences, which draws many tourists.

== See also ==
- List of Historic Sites of Japan (Ōita)

== Literature ==
- Benesch, Oleg and Ran Zwigenberg (2019). Japan's Castles: Citadels of Modernity in War and Peace. Cambridge: Cambridge University Press. p. 374. ISBN 9781108481946.
- De Lange, William (2021). An Encyclopedia of Japanese Castles. Groningen: Toyo Press. pp. 600 pages. ISBN 978-9492722300.
