= Tōyama Shinaemon =

- 遠山 品右衛門

Personal details
- Born: Tōyama Rikichi (遠山 里吉); June 17, 1851 Noguchi, Matsumoto Domain, Shinano Province, Japan
- Died: August 28, 1920 (aged 69) Hakuba, Nagano Prefecture, Japan

Tōyama Shinaemon (Japanese: 遠山 品右衛門; 1851–1920) was a Japanese hunter and mountain guide. He was also a master angler.

== Biography ==
Tōyama was born in the Matsumoto Domain village of Noguchi. With the abolition of the han system in 1871, the neighboring Kaga Domain's forestry patrols in the mountains of Etchū were discontinued. Now free to enter the mountains, 20-year-old Tōyama began a lifestyle of subsistence hunting. Around 1875, he built a cabin on the Kurobe River.

In 1878, Tōyama was visited by Ernest Satow and A. G. S. Hawes.

In 1899, the Japanese government began charging a regular tax on privately owned structures within national forests. Tōyama was able to pay this tax in order to retain ownership of his cabin. In his later years, he abandoned the cabin and returned to Noguchi village.

Tōyama died at his home on August 28, 1920. Many of Tōyama's belongings, including his hunting tools, are preserved at the Ōmachi Alpine Museum in Ōmachi.

== See also ==
- Uji Chōjirō
