= Matsumoto Domain =

Japanese feudal domain

Matsumoto Domain 松本藩
- under Tokugawa shogunate Japan
- 1590–1871
- Capital: Matsumoto Castle
- Area
  - Coordinates: 36.6535°N 138.3160°E
  - Type: Daimyō
- Historical era: Edo period
  - Established: 1590
  - Disestablished: 1871
- Today part of: part of Nagano Prefecture

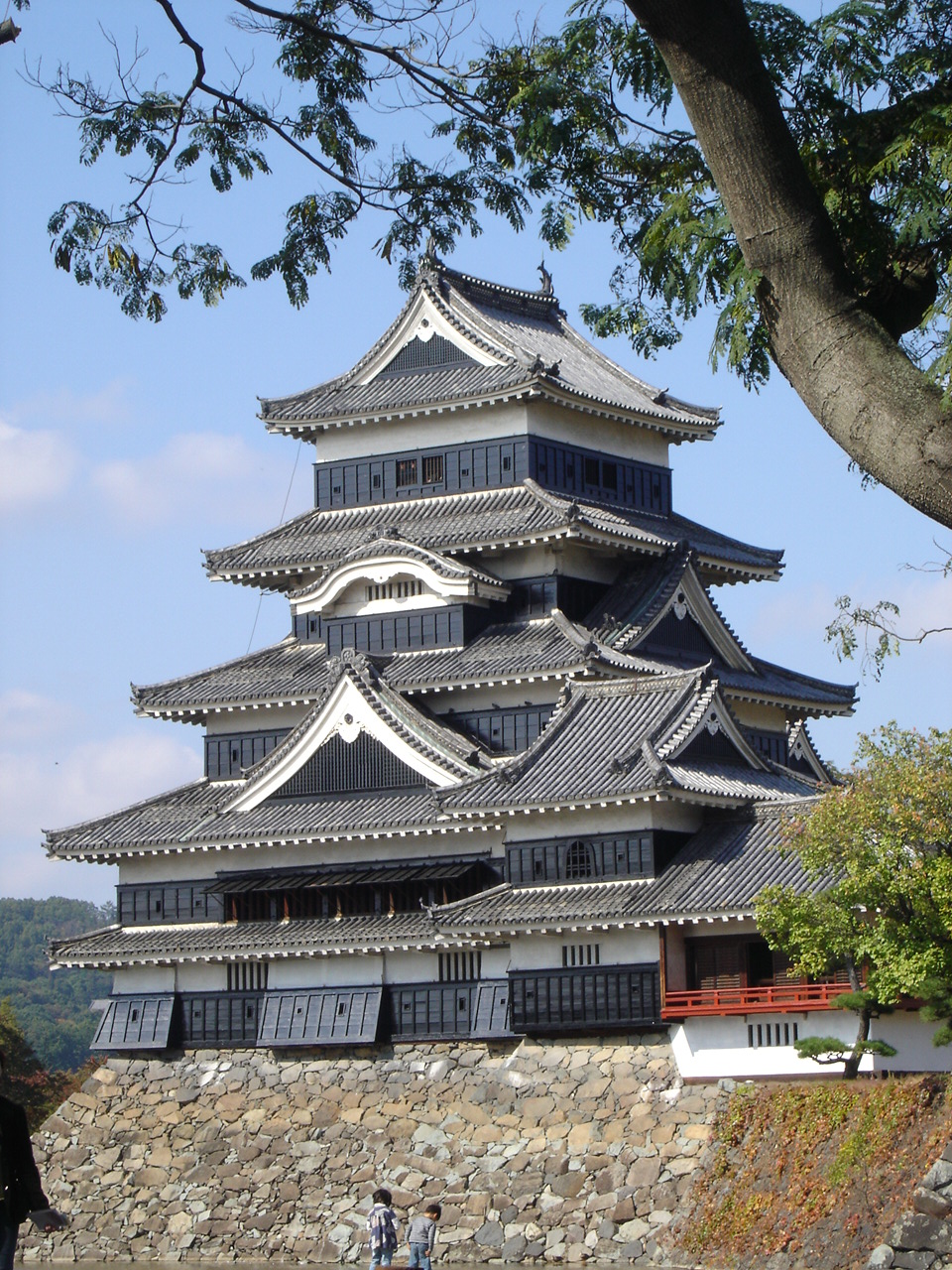
Matsumoto Castle, administrative headquarters of Matsumoto Domain

Matsumoto Domain (松本藩, Matsumoto han) was a feudal domain under the Tokugawa shogunate of Edo period Japan. It is located in Shinano Province, Honshū. The domain was centered at Matsumoto Castle, located in what is the city of Matsumoto in Nagano Prefecture.

== History ==
During the Sengoku period, Matsumoto was the seat of the Ogasawara clan, the shugo of Shinano Province. However, Ogasawara clan was defeated by Takeda Shingen in a series of battles from 1542 to 1548, and his lands became part of the Takeda clan territories. After the fall of the Takeda clan, the area became a disputed region, eventually coming under the control of Tokugawa Ieyasu, who placed Ogasawara Hidemasa in charge of Matsumoto.

When Toyotomi Hideyoshi transferred Ieyasu to the Kantō region in 1590, he placed Ieyasu’s former retainer Ishikawa Norimasa in charge of Matsumoto Domain, with assessed kokudaka of 100,000 koku. Norimasa and his son Yasunaga built much of the present-day Matsumoto Castle by 1593–94. The Ishikawa were confirmed as daimyō of Matsumoto Domain after the formation of the Tokugawa shogunate, but were dispossessed due to a political scandal in 1613 involving Ōkubo Nagamasa.

In 1613, Ogasawara Hidemasa was allowed to return to Matsumoto Domain, with revenues of 80,000 koku. His son, Ogasawara Tadazane was transferred to Akashi Domain in Harima Province in 1617, and Matsumoto was subsequently ruled by two branches of the Matsudaira clan to 1638, the Hotta clan to 1642, the Mizuno clan to 1725, and finally the Toda-branch of the Matsudaira clan from 1725 to the Meiji Restoration in 1868.

During the Bakumatsu period, forces from Matsumoto supported the Tokugawa shogunate against the Mito rebellion and at the Kinmon incident and in both Chōshū expeditions. However, with the start of the Boshin War, the final daimyō of Matsumoto, Matsudaira Mitsuhisa, changed sides to the imperial cause, and his forces fought in the imperial armies at the Battle of Hokuetsu and the Battle of Aizu. He later served as domain governor until 1871, and was awarded the title of shishaku (marquis) under the kazoku peerage system. Matsumoto Domain subsequently became part of Nagano Prefecture.

== Bakumatsu period holdings ==
As with most domains in the han system, Matsumoto Domain consisted of several discontinuous territories calculated to provide the assigned kokudaka, based on periodic cadastral surveys and projected agricultural yields.

- Shinano Province
  - 179 villages in Azumino District (the entire district)
  - 79 villages in Chikuma District

== List of daimyō ==
#	Name	Tenure	Courtesy title	Court Rank	‘’kokudaka	Notes
Ishikawa clan (tozama) 1590-1613
1	Ishikawa Kazumasa (石川数正)	1590-1592	Hōki-no-kami (伯耆守)	Junior 5th Rank, Lower Grade (従五位下)	100,000 koku	
2	Ishikawa Yasunaga (石川康長)	1592-1613	Ukon-no-daiyū (式部少輔)	Junior 5th Rank, Lower Grade (従五位下)	80,000 koku	dispossessed
Ogasawara clan (fudai) 1613-1617
1	Ogasawara Hidemasa (小笠原秀政)	1613-1615	Hyōbu-daifu (兵部大輔)	Junior 5th Rank, Lower Grade (従五位下)	80,000 koku	From Iida Domain
2	Ogasawara Tadazane (松平直政)	1615-1617	Ukon-no-daiyū (右近将監); Jijū (侍従)	Junior 4th Rank, Lower Grade (従四位下)	80,000 koku	To Akashi Domain
Toda-Matsudaira clan (fudai) 1617-1633
1	Matsudaira Yasunaga (松平康長)	1617-1633	Tanba-no-kami (丹波守)	Junior 4th Rank, Lower Grade (従四位下)	70,000 koku	From Takasaki Domain
2	Matsudaira Yasunao (松平直政)	1633-1633	Sado-no-kami (佐渡守)	Junior 5th Rank, Lower Grade (従五位下)	70,000 koku	To Akashi Domain
Matsudaira clan (Shimpan) 1633-1638
1	Matsudaira Naomasa (松平直政)	1633-1638	Dewa-no-kami (出羽守); Jijū (侍従	Junior 4th Rank, Lower Grade (従四位下)	70,000 koku	to Matsue Domain
Hotta clan (fudai) 1638-1642
1	Hotta Masamori (堀田正盛)	1638-1642	Dewa-no-kami (出羽守); Jijū (侍従)	Junior 4th Rank, Lower Grade (従四位下)	100,000 koku	to Sakura Domain
Mizuno clan (fudai) 1642 -1725
1	Mizuno Tadakiyo (水野忠清)	1642-1647	Hayato-no-shō (隼人正)	Junior 5th Rank, Lower Grade (従五位下)	70,000 koku	from Yoshida Domain
2	Mizuni Tadamoto (水野忠職)	1647-1668	Dewa-no-kami (出羽守)	Junior 5th Rank, Lower Grade (従五位下)	70,000 koku	
3	Mizuno Tadanao (水野忠直)	1668-1713	Nakatsukasa-no-sho (中務少輔)	Junior 5th Rank, Lower Grade (従五位下)	60,000 koku	
4	Mizuno Tadachika (水野忠周)	1713-1718	Dewa-no-kami (出羽守)	Junior 5th Rank, Lower Grade (従五位下)	70,000 koku	
5	Mizuno Tadamoto (水野忠幹)	1718-1723	Hyūga-no-kami (日向守)	Junior 5th Rank, Lower Grade (従五位下)	70,000 koku	
6	Mizuno Tadatsune (水野忠恒)	1723-1725	Hayato-no-shō (隼人正)	Junior 5th Rank, Lower Grade (従五位下)	70,000 koku	dispossessed
Toda-Matsudaira clan (fudai) 1725 -1871
1	Matsudaira Mitsuchika (松平光慈)	1725-1732	Tanba-no-kami (丹波守)	Junior 5th Rank, Lower Grade (従五位下)	60,000 koku	from Shima-Toba Domain
2	Matsudaira Mitsuo (松平光雄)	1732-1756	Tanba-no-kami (丹波守)	Junior 5th Rank, Lower Grade (従五位下)	60,000 koku	
3	Matsudaira Mitsuyasu (松平光徳)	1756-1759	Tanba-no-kami (丹波守)	Junior 5th Rank, Lower Grade (従五位下)	60,000 koku	
4	Matsudaira Mitsumasa (松平光和)	1759-1774	Ise-no-kami (伊勢守)	Junior 5th Rank, Lower Grade (従五位下)	60,000 koku	
5	Matsudaira Mitsuyoshi (松平光悌)	1774-1786	Tanba-no-kami (丹波守)	Junior 5th Rank, Lower Grade (従五位下)	60,000 koku	
6	Matsudaira Mitsuyuki (松平光行)	1786-1800	Tanba-no-kami (丹波守)	Junior 5th Rank, Lower Grade (従五位下)	60,000 koku	
7	Matsudaira Mitsutsura (松平光年)	1800-1837	Tanba-no-kami (丹波守)	Junior 5th Rank, Lower Grade (従五位下)	60,000 koku	
8	Matsudaira Mitsutsune (松平光庸)	1837-1845	Tanba-no-kami (丹波守)	Junior 5th Rank, Lower Grade (従五位下)	60,000 koku	
9	Matsudaira Mitsuhisa (松平光則)	1845-1871	Tanba-no-kami (丹波守)	Junior 5th Rank, Lower Grade (従五位下)	60,000 koku	

=== Matsudaira Mitsuchika ===
Matsudaira Mitsuchika (松平光慈; October 22, 1711 – September 29, 1732) was a daimyō under the Edo period Tokugawa shogunate. He was the 2nd daimyō of Yodo Domain in Yamashiro Province in 1717, 1st daimyō of Toba Domain in Shima Province from 1717-1725 and the 1st daimyō of Matsumoto Domain in Shinano Province from 1725-1732. His courtesy title was Tamba-no-kami. Mitsuchika was the fifth son of Matsudaira Mitsuhiro of the Toda-Matsudaira clan. In 1716, he was adopted as heir by his uncle, who was a 3000 koku hatamoto; however, he was adopted back by his real father only a few months later after the deaths of his two elder brothers. He became daimyō on his father's death in 1717, and the same year the clan was ordered to transfer from Yodo to Toba. In 1723, he was received in formal audience by Shōgun Tokugawa Yoshimune. In 1725, the clan was again transferred, this time to Matsumoto Domain. In 1728, he was captain of the guard for Shogun Tokugawa Yoshimune's pilgrimage to the Nikkō Tōshō-gū. He first visited his domain for the first time in 1730. He spent several weeks the following year touring his domain. In 1732, the palace of Matsumoto Castle burned down, but as there were no funds for rebuilding, he moved into the secondary residence in the second bailey of the castle. He died later the same year at the age of 32 without heir.

=== Matsudaira Mitsuo ===
Matsudaira Mitsuo (松平光雄; October 7, 1716 – November 22, 1756) was the 2nd Matsudaira daimyō of Matsumoto Domain and 7th hereditary chieftain of the Toda-Matsudaira clan. His courtesy title was Tamba-no-kami. Mitsuo was the fifth son of Matsudaira Mitsuhiro and was born at Yodo Castle. In 1732, he was posthumous adopted as heir by his elder brother, Matsudaira Mitsuchika and was received in formal audience by Shōgun Tokugawa Yoshimune. In 1735, the authority to issue travel permits to women passing through official checkpoints at the Usui Pass and Fukushima-juku on then Nakasendō highway was restored to Matsumoto Domain. In 1743, the shogunate abolished its jin'ya at Shiojiri and placed the 159 tenryō villages with a kokudaka of 53,290 koku under the administration of Matsumoto Domain, although subsequently (in 1788), Naka-no-jō jin'ya was established to administer 13,000 koku of this territory. His wife was a daughter of Satake Yoshimune of Kubota Domain. He died at the clan's Gofukubashi residence in Edo in 1756 at the age of 41.

=== Matsudaira Mitsuyasu ===
Matsudaira Mitsuyasu (松平光徳; February 1, 1737 – February 3, 1759) was the 3rd Matsudaira daimyō of Matsumoto Domain and 8th hereditary chieftain of the Toda-Matsudaira clan. Mitsuyasu was the eldest son of Matsudaira Mitsuo and was born at Matsumoto Castle. He became daimyō on his father's death in 1756; however, he died in 1759 at the clan's Gofukubashi residence in Edo at the age of 23. His wife was a daughter of Abe Michichika of Oshi Domain.

=== Matsudaira Mitsumasa ===
Matsudaira Mitsumasa (松平光和; October 31, 1744 – August 19, 1775) was the 4th Matsudaira daimyō of Matsumoto Domain and 9th hereditary chieftain of the Toda-Matsudaira clan. Mitsumasa was the sixth son of Matsudaira Mitsuo and was posthumously adopted as heir to his brother, Matsudaira Mitsuyasu. He was received in formal audience by Shōgun Tokugawa Ieshige in 1759, and was appointed a sōshaban in 1767, holding that post until 1772. He retired in 1774 and was given the courtesy title of Ise-no-kami. He died the following year. His wife was a daughter of Matsudaira Takechika of Tanagura Domain; however, he had no male heir.

=== Matsudaira Mitsuyoshi ===
Matsudaira Mitsuyoshi (松平光悌; November 30, 1754 – July 16, 1786) was the 5th Matsudaira daimyō of Matsumoto Domain and 10th hereditary chieftain of the Toda-Matsudaira clan. Mitsuyoshi was the 8th son of Matsudaira Mitsuo and was adopted as heir to his brother, Matsudaira Mitsumasa in 1774. He was born at the clan's Gofukubashi residence in Edo. He was received in formal audience by Shōgun Tokugawa Ieharu the same year. In 1777, Matsumoto Castle was destroyed by a fire, and he was forced to apply to the shogunate for a loan of 5000 ryō for rebuilding. He died at the clan's Gofukubashi residence in Edo in 1786. His wife was a daughter of Abe Masatoshi of Oshi Domain.

=== Matsudaira Mitsuyuki ===
Matsudaira Mitsuyuki (松平光行; May 4, 1769 – January 18, 1840) was the 6th Matsudaira daimyō of Matsumoto Domain and 11th hereditary chieftain of the Toda-Matsudaira clan. Mitsuyuki was the son of a 5000 koku hatamoto descended from the 4th son of Matsudaira Mitsuhiro. He was posthumously adopted as heir to Matsudaira Mitsuyoshi in 1786 and married one of Mitsuyoshi's daughters. He was received in formal audience by Shōgun Tokugawa Ienari the same year. He founded a han school in 1793. He retired from public life in 1800, and took the tonsure, becoming a lay monk. He died at the clan's secondary residence in Edo in Azabu in 1840.

=== Matsudaira Mitsutsura ===
Matsudaira Mitsutsura (松平光年; May 18, 1781 – March 10, 1837) was the 7th Matsudaira daimyō of Matsumoto Domain and 12th hereditary chieftain of the Toda-Matsudaira clan. Mitsutsura was the eldest son Matsudaira Mitsuyoshi, but as he was only an infant at the time of his father's death, Matsudaira Mitsuyuki was selected by the clan elders to become daimyō . Mitsuyuki adopted Mitsutsura as his heir in 1794, and he was received in formal audience by Shōgun Tokugawa Ienari. He became daimyō on Mitsuyuki's retirement in 1800. He was appointed a sōshaban in 1817, and became Jisha-bugyō in 1828. In 1812 and 1820, the shogunate entrusted an additional 8000 koku of tenryō lands to his administration. He died in Matsumoto in 1837. His wife was a daughter of Toda Ujinori of Ogaki Domain, and after her death, he remarried to a daughter of Hachisuka Shigeyoshi of Tokushima Domain; however, he had no male heir.

=== Matsudaira Mitsutsune ===
Matsudaira Mitsutsune (松平光庸; August 8, 1798 – October 4, 1878) was the 8th Matsudaira daimyō of Matsumoto Domain and 13th hereditary chieftain of the Toda-Matsudaira clan. Mitsutsune was the third son Matsudaira Mitsuyuki, and was adopted as heir by Matsudaira Mitsutsura in 1819. He was received in formal audience by Shōgun Tokugawa Ienari the same year. He became daimyō on Mitsutsune's death in 1837. He attempted to reform the fiscal administration of the domain, but this led to conflict between the conservative hereditary advisors to the domain and the new advisors he hired, which eventually caused him to retire in 1845. He relocated to Tokyo in 1872, where he died in 1878. His wife was a daughter of Kuze Hiroyasu of Sekiyado Domain.

=== Matsudaira Mitsuhisa ===
Matsudaira Mitsuhisa (松平光則; August 17, 1828 – December 30, 1892) was the 9th Matsudaira daimyō of Matsumoto Domain and 14th hereditary chieftain of the Toda-Matsudaira clan.

== See also ==
List of Han
