= Matsudaira Mitsuhisa =

Daimyō of Matsumoto (1828–1892)

Matsudaira Mitsuhisa 松平光則
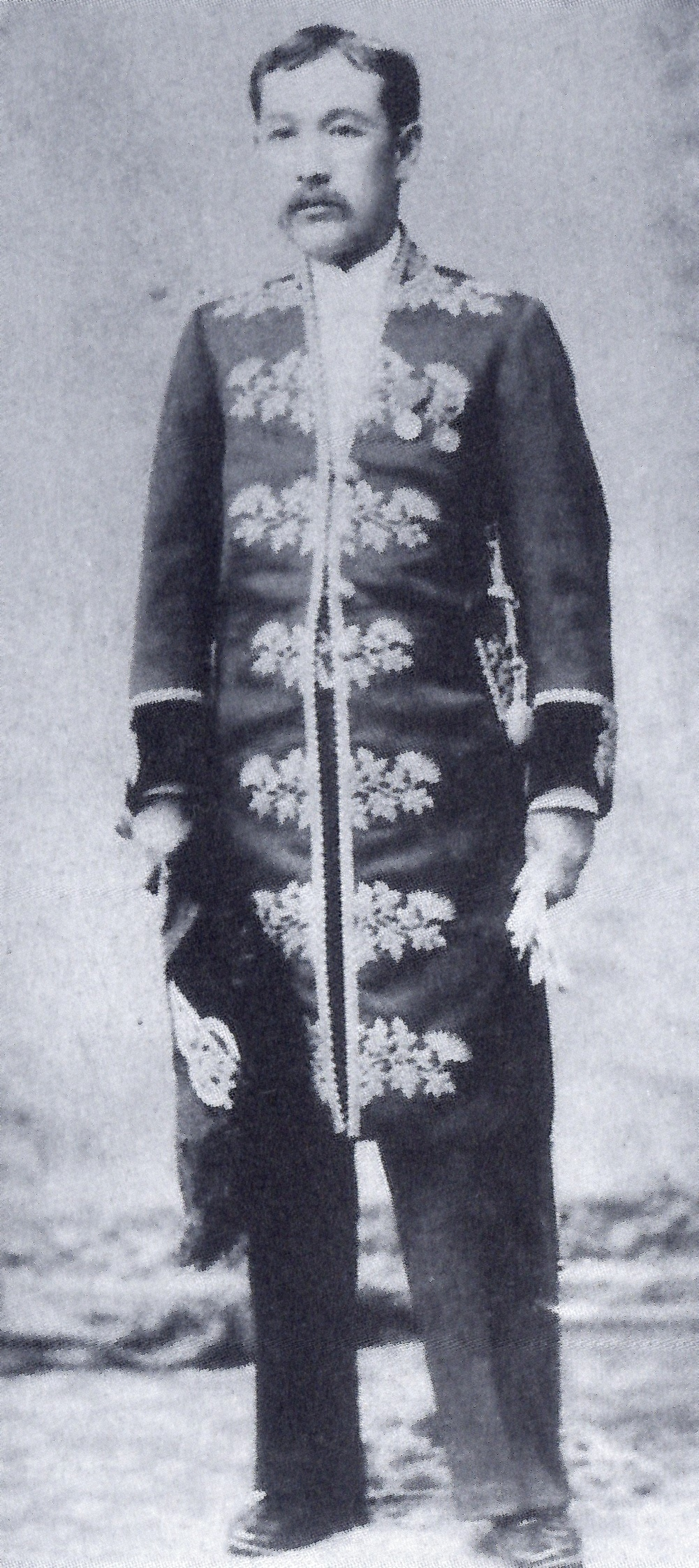
- Born: August 17, 1828
- Died: December 30, 1892 (aged 64)
- Occupation: Daimyō of Matsumoto Domain (1845-1871)
- Father: Matsudaira Mitsutsune

Matsudaira Mitsuhisa (松平光則; August 17, 1828 – December 30, 1892) was the 9th and final daimyō of Matsumoto Domain in Shinano Province, Honshū, Japan (modern-day Nagano Prefecture) and 14th hereditary chieftain of the Toda-Matsudaira clan. Before the Meiji Restoration, his courtesy title was Tanba-no-kami, and his Court rank was Junior Fourth Rank, Lower Grade.

== Biography ==
Matsudaira Mitsuhisa was the younger son of Matsudaira Mitsutsune, the 8th daimyō of Matsumoto. In May 1842, he was proclaimed heir, and was received in formal audience with Shōgun Tokugawa Ieyoshi the same year. He became daimyō of Matsumoto Domain in 1845 on the retirement of his father. In 1861, he was appointed guard for Princess Kazunomiya for her travel through Shinano on the Nakasendō between Motoyama-juku and Shimosuwa-shuku on her way to Edo to marry the Shōgun. The following year, troops from Matsumoto were assigned to guard the British legation in Edo at the temple of Tōzen-ji; however, one of the samurai from Matsumoto, Ito Gunbei, was a member of the terrorists who attacked the legation the same year and was forced to commit seppuku for his role in the deaths of two Royal Marines. The same year, Matsumoto was also assigned to strengthen the guard of the defenses of Edo Bay at Uraga. Domain forces were also assigned to Kyoto in 1864 and fought on the Tokugawa side during the First Chōshū expedition. In 1868, just before the arrival of imperial troops into Matsumoto during the Boshin War, the domain capitulated and defected to the imperial side. Troops from Matsumoto subsequently fought for the Meiji government at the Battle of Hokuetsu and Battle of Aizu. Nevertheless, the domain was punished by a loss of 3000 koku from its kokudaka for its tardiness in supporting the Meiji government.

In 1869, Mitsuhisa was appointed domain governor. He strongly supported the Haibutsu kishaku movement, destroying many Buddhist temples within his territories, including the clan's mortuary temple and demanded that his retainers henceforth conduct their funerals per State Shinto rites. He changed his name to Toda Mitsuhisa (戸田 光則), and to further distance himself from the defeated Tokugawa clan, changed his family crest. In 1881, he retired in favor of his son, Toda Yasuhiro. In 1884, he received the kazoku peerage title of shishaku (viscount). He died in 1891 and his grave is at the Somei Cemetery in Magome, Tokyo.

Mitsuhisa was married to a daughter of Mizoguchi Naoaki of Shibata Domain, and he had four sons and five daughters.

Preceded by Matsudaira Mitsutsune	9th Daimyo of Matsumoto; 1845-1871	Succeeded by none
