= Kokura Domain =

Japanese feudal domain located in Buzen Province

Toyotsu Domain (1870–1871) 豊津藩 Kawara Domain (1867–1870) 香春藩 Kokura Domain (1600–1867) 小倉藩
- Domain of Japan
- 1600–1871
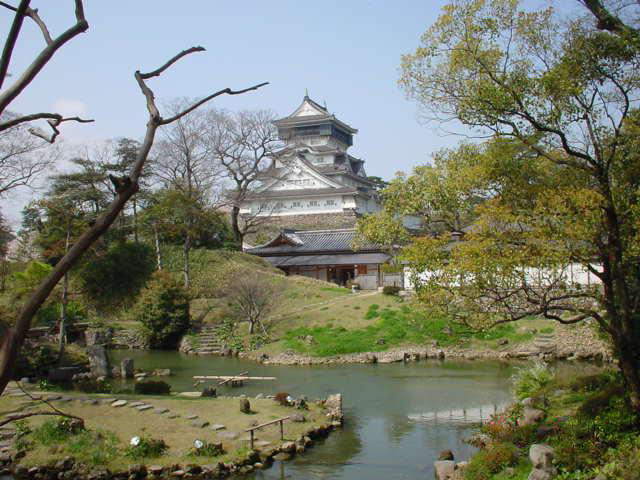
- Kokura Castle

- Flag Mon of the Ogasawara clan
- Capital: Kokura Castle (1600–1867); Kawara jin'ya (1867–70); Toyotsu jin'ya (1870–71)
- Area
  - Coordinates: 33°53′4.0″N 130°52′27.32″E
- Historical era: Edo period Meiji period
  - Established: 1600
  - Disestablished: 1871
- Today part of: Fukuoka Prefecture

Location of Kokura Castle
Kokura Domain (Japan)

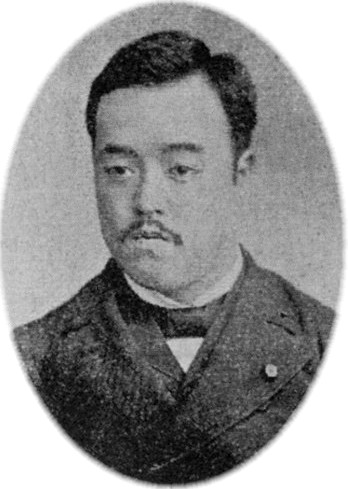
Ogasawara Tadanobu, final daimyo of Kokura Domain

Kokura Domain (小倉藩, Kokura-han) was a feudal domain under the Tokugawa shogunate of Edo period Japan, in what is now eastern Fukuoka Prefecture. It was centered around Kokura Castle in what is now Kitakyushu, Fukuoka and was ruled by the fudai daimyō Ogasawara clan for much of its history. In the Bakumatsu period and first years of the Meiji period, it was briefly known as Kawara Domain (香春藩) and then Toyotsu Domain (豊津藩).

== History ==
In 1587, Takahashi Motane, the adopted heir of Takahashi Kansei, surrendered Kokura Castle to Toyotomi Hideyoshi during Hideyoshi's conquest of Kyūshū. He assigned it to Mori Katsunobu with a fief 60,000 koku (one theory says 100,000 koku) in Buzen Province. Furthermore, his son Katsunaga was also given either 10,000 koku or 40,000 koku in Buzen Province, and changed his original surname "Mori" to "Mōri" Mōri clan, ruler of the Chugoku region although he was not a blood relation. Mōri Katsunobu and his son Katsunaga sided with the Western army at the Battle of Sekigahara in 1600 and were forced to surrender their holdings.

The victorious Tokugawa Ieyasu rewarded his general Hosokawa Tadaoki who has successfully held Tanabe Castle in Tango Province, against the Western army at the Siege of Tanabe with a total kokudaka of 180,000 koku in Tango Province and an additional 399,000 koku in Buzen Province (Tanabe and Kitsuki) and Bungo Province (Kunisaki and Hayami). This marked the establishment of Kokura Domain. Initially, the Hosokawa made Nakatsu Castle their stronghold, but soon began construction of a new castle town and castle on the site of the Mōri clan's former Kokura Castle. The relocation was completed in 1602. It was during this era of the Hosokawa clan that the duel between Miyamoto Musashi and Sasaki Kojirō took place on Ganryu Island, which was then part of Kokura Domain. In 1620, Tadaoki retired and his third son Hosokawa Tadatoshi became the second daimyō of Kokura Domain. In 1632, his fief was increased to 540,000 koku and he transferred to Kumamoto Domain. In the same year, Tadatoshi's brother-in-law Ogasawara Tadazane from the Akashi Domain in Harima Province was transferred to Kokura with a fief of 150,000 koku in northern Buzen. At the same time, Ogasawara Tadazane's nephew Nagatsugu entered Nakatsu Castle, which had previously been maintained as a branch castle of Kokura Domain, with 80,000 koku fief, forming Nakatsu Domain, and Ogasawara Tadazane's younger brother Tadatomo was assigned Kitsuki Castle in Bungo Province with a 40,000 koku fief, forming Kitsuki Domain.

Since Ogasawara Tadazane's mother was the daughter of Matsudaira Nobuyasu and thus the great-great-granddaughter of Tokugawa Ieyasu, the clan was entrusted with holding the gateway to Kyushu, and played the role of Kyushu Tandai, monitoring the various powerful Tozama daimyō who ruled most of the island. Musashi Miyamoto's heir, Miyamoto Iori, supported Tadazane as karō of the Kokura clan with a fief of 4,000 koku due to his military exploits during the Shimabara Rebellion, in which both his father and his father went to war, and the Miyamoto family subsequently inherited this position from generation to generation. When Ogaswara Tadao became daimyō in 1667, he divided 10,000 koku of the domain to create Kokura Shinden Domain (Chizuka Domain) for his younger brother Masakata, who was allowed to establish a cadet branch of the clan.

In 1730, the second son of Ogasawara Tadaki was adopted as heir by Ogasawara Nagaoki, of Anji Domain in Harima Province. The three domains of Kokura, Kokura Shinden and Anji subsequently strengthened their domains by intermarriage and through the adoption of successors. In 1758, the fourth daimyō, Ogasawara Tadafusa, established the han school Shieisai, a literary and military training ground for retainers of the domain, within Kokura Castle. It was later renamed Shieikan. In 1777, Inukai Tomohiro became karō and reformed the domain's finances. Thanks to his efforts, his finances improved around 1798, but due to a plot by his political opponents, he was overthrown in 1803. Although declared innocent of wrongdoing, he was imprisoned and murdered. After that, factional conflicts among senior vassals continued within the domain.

In 1811, during the era of the 6th daimyō, Ogasawara Tadatatsu, the Goie Riot, also known as the Cultural Incident or the Black and White Riot, broke out. In 1820, the district governor, Sadanori Sugiu, began industrial promotion measures, including river improvements on the Imagawa River, road improvements in various areas, and the construction of Ujima Port. Peasant uprisings continued to occur into the Bunsei era (1818-1830)

During the Bakumatsu period, reforms of the domain administration began under the karō Shimamura Shizuma and Kouno Shiro. The collection and sale of major products such as agricultural products, coal, and pottery became domain monopolies. In 1863, in order to strengthen the sea defenses, coastal artillery batteries were constructed. especially along the Kanmon Strait, and the recruitment and training of agricultural workers to serve as auxiliary troops also began. In this year, Chōshū Domain on the opposite side of Kanmon Strait shelled foreign ships, leading to the Shimonoseki War. The Tokugawa shogunate undertook punitive expeditions against Chōshū in 1864 and in 1866. Although Kokura Domain did not engage in any combat operations at that time, Chōshū unilaterally sent troops to occupy areas of Kokura Domain on the Kanmon Strait. Forces from pro-shogunate domains allied with Kokura retreated in panic, and the Kokura Domain administration set fire to Kokura Castle to keep it from falling into Chōshū hands. Peace between Chōshū and Kokura was negotiated in 1867, but as a result of this negotiation, Chōshū was allowed to retain the areas which it had occupied, including the site of Kokura Castle. The Kokura Domain headquarters was relocated to a jin'ya constructed in what is now the town of Kawara, Fukuoka and the domain was renamed Kawara Domain (香春藩). A year later, it was relocated to a new jin'ya in the village of Toyotsu in what is now the town of Miyako, Fukuoka and the domain renamed Toyotsu Domain (豊津藩).

On July 14, 1871, the domain became "Toyotsu Prefecture" due to the abolition of feudal domains and establishment of prefectures, and then was incorporated into Kokura Prefecture, which in turn was merged into Fukuoka Prefecture in 1876. In 1884, the Ogasawara clan was granted the kazoku peerage rank of Count.

== Kokura Shinden Domain (Chizuka Domain) ==
On becoming daimyō in 1667, Ogaswara Tadao assigned 10,000 koku of Kokura Domain to his younger brother Masakata, establishing a subsidiary domain and a cadet branch of the clan as insurance against attainder should the succession of the main Ogawasawa lineage fail. Kokura Shinden Domain was initially a "paper domain" with its revenues assigned from the general revenues of the parent domain and without direct holdings of its own. The daimyō of Kokura Shinden Domain resided permanently in Edo and were not subject to sankin kōtai. However, after the Meiji restoration, in 1869 the domain established a jin'ya in what is now Buzen, Fukuoka and renamed itself Chizuka Domain. Two years later, with the abolition of the han system, it became Chizuka Prefecture and was soon absorbed into Kokura Prefecture and then Fukuoka Prefecture. Ogasawara sadamasa, the final daimyō, became a viscount under the kazoku peerage system.

== Holdings at the end of the Edo period ==
As with most domains in the han system, Kokura Domain consisted of several discontinuous territories calculated to provide the assigned kokudaka, based on periodic cadastral surveys and projected agricultural yields.

Kokura (Toyotsu) Domain

- Buzen Province
  - 64 villages in Tagawa District
  - 71 villages in Miyako District
  - 76 villages in Nakatsu District
  - 41 villages in Tsuiki District
  - 31 villages in Kōge District
  - 22 villages in Jinseki District

Kokura Shinden (Chizuka) Domain

- Buzen Province
  - 26 villages in Kōge District

== List of daimyō ==
Kokura (Toyotsu) Domain

#	Name	Tenure	Courtesy title	Court Rank	kokudaka
Hosokawa clan, 1600–1632 (Tozama daimyō)
1	Hosokawa Tadaoki (細川忠興)	1602–1620	Etchū-no-kami (越中守)	Junior 4th Rank, Lower Grade (従四位下)	399,000 koku
2	Hosokawa Tadatoshi (細川 忠利)	1620–1632	Etchū-no-kami (越中守)	Junior 4th Rank, Lower Grade (従四位下)	399,000 koku
Ogasawara clan, 1632–1871 (Fudai daimyō)
1	Ogasawara Tadazane (小笠原 忠真)	1632–1667	Sakon'e-no-shōgen (左近将監)	Junior 4th Rank, Lower Grade (従四位下)	150,000 koku
2	Osagawara Tadao (小笠原忠雄)	1667–1725	Sakon'e-no-shōgen (左近将監)	Junior 4th Rank, Lower Grade (従四位下)	150,000 koku
3	Osagawara Tadamoto (小笠原 忠)	1725–1752	Junior 4th Rank, Lower Grade (従四位下)	150,000 koku	
4	Osagawara Tadafusa (小笠原忠総)	1752–1790	Iyo-no-kami (伊予守)	Junior 4th Rank, Lower Grade (従四位下)	150,000 koku
5	Osagawara Tadamitsu (小笠原忠苗)	1791–1804	Iyo-no-kami (伊予守)	Junior 4th Rank, Lower Grade (従四位下)	150,000 koku
6	Osagawara Tadakata (小笠原忠固)	1804–1843	Daizen-no-kami (大膳大夫)	Junior 4th Rank, Lower Grade (従四位下)	150,000 koku
7	Osagawara Tadaakira (小笠原忠徴)	1843–1856	Sakyo-no-daifu (左京大夫)	Junior 4th Rank, Lower Grade (従四位下)	150,000 koku
8	Osagawara Tadahiro (小笠原忠嘉)	1856–1860	Ukon'e-no-shōgen (右近将監)	Junior 4th Rank, Lower Grade (従四位下)	150,000 koku
9	Osagawara Tadayoshi (小笠原忠幹)	1860–1865	Daizen-no-kami (大膳大夫)	Junior 4th Rank, Lower Grade (従四位下)	150,000 koku
10	Ogasawara Tadanobu(小笠原忠忱)	1865–1871	Sakon'e-no-shōgen (左近将監)	Junior 4th Rank, Lower Grade (従四位下)	150,000 koku

Kokura Shinden (Chizuka) Domain

#	Name	Tenure	Courtesy title	Court Rank	kokudaka
Ogasawara clan, 1667–1871 (Fudai daimyō)
1	Ogasawara Sanekata (小笠原真方)	1667–1709	Bitchū-no-kami (備中守)	Junior 5th Rank, Lower Grade (従五位下)	10,000 koku
2	Ogasawara Sadami (小笠原貞通)	1709–1747	Ōmi-no-kami (近江守)	Junior 5th Rank, Lower Grade (従五位下)	10,000 koku
3	Ogasawara Sadaaki (小笠原貞顕)	1747–1782	Danjō-no-suke (弾正少弼)	Junior 5th Rank, Lower Grade (従五位下)	10,000 koku
4	Ogasawara Sadaatsu (小笠原貞温)	1782–1822	Ōmi-no-kami (近江守)	Junior 5th Rank, Lower Grade (従五位下)	10,000 koku
5	Ogasawara Sadatoshi (小笠原貞哲)	1822–1843	Ōmi-no-kami (近江守)	Junior 5th Rank, Lower Grade (従五位下)	10,000 koku
6	Ogasawara Sadayoshi (小笠原貞謙)	1843–1851	Bungo-no-kami (豊後守)	Junior 5th Rank, Lower Grade (従五位下)	10,000 koku
7	Ogasawara Tadahiro (小笠原忠嘉)	1851–1854	Iyo-no-kami (伊予守)	Junior 5th Rank, Lower Grade (従五位下)	10,000 koku
8	Ogasawara Sadayasu (小笠原貞寧)	1854–1856	-none-	-none-	10,000 koku
9	Ogasawara Sadamasa (小笠原貞正)	1856–1871	Ōmi-no-kami (近江守)	Junior 5th Rank, Lower Grade (従五位下)	10,000 koku

== See also ==
- List of Han
- Abolition of the han system
