= Akashi Domain =

Japanese feudal domain located in Harima Province

Akashi Domain 明石藩
- under Tokugawa shogunate Japan
- 1600–1871
- Capital: Akashi Castle
- Area
  - Coordinates: 34°39′09″N 134°59′30″E
  - Type: Daimyō
- Historical era: Edo period
  - Established: 1600
  - Ogasawara clan: 1617
  - Toda-Matsudaira clan: 1633
  - Okubo clan: 1639
  - Fujii-Matsudaira clan: 1649
  - Honda clan: 1679
  - Echizen-Matsidaira clan: 1682
  - Disestablished: 1871
- Today part of: part of Hyogo Prefecture

Location of Akashi Castle
Akashi Domain (Japan)

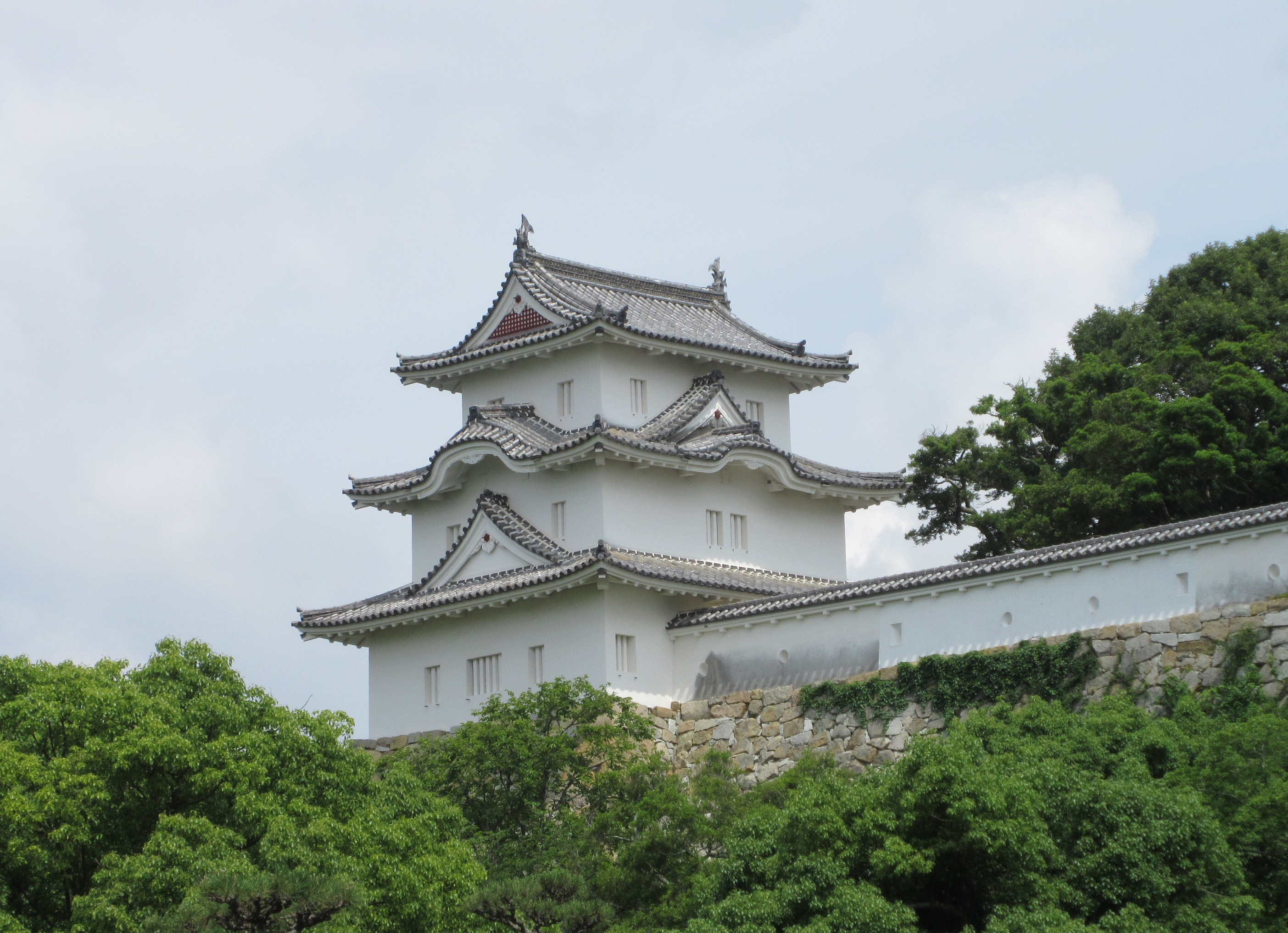
Akashi Castle

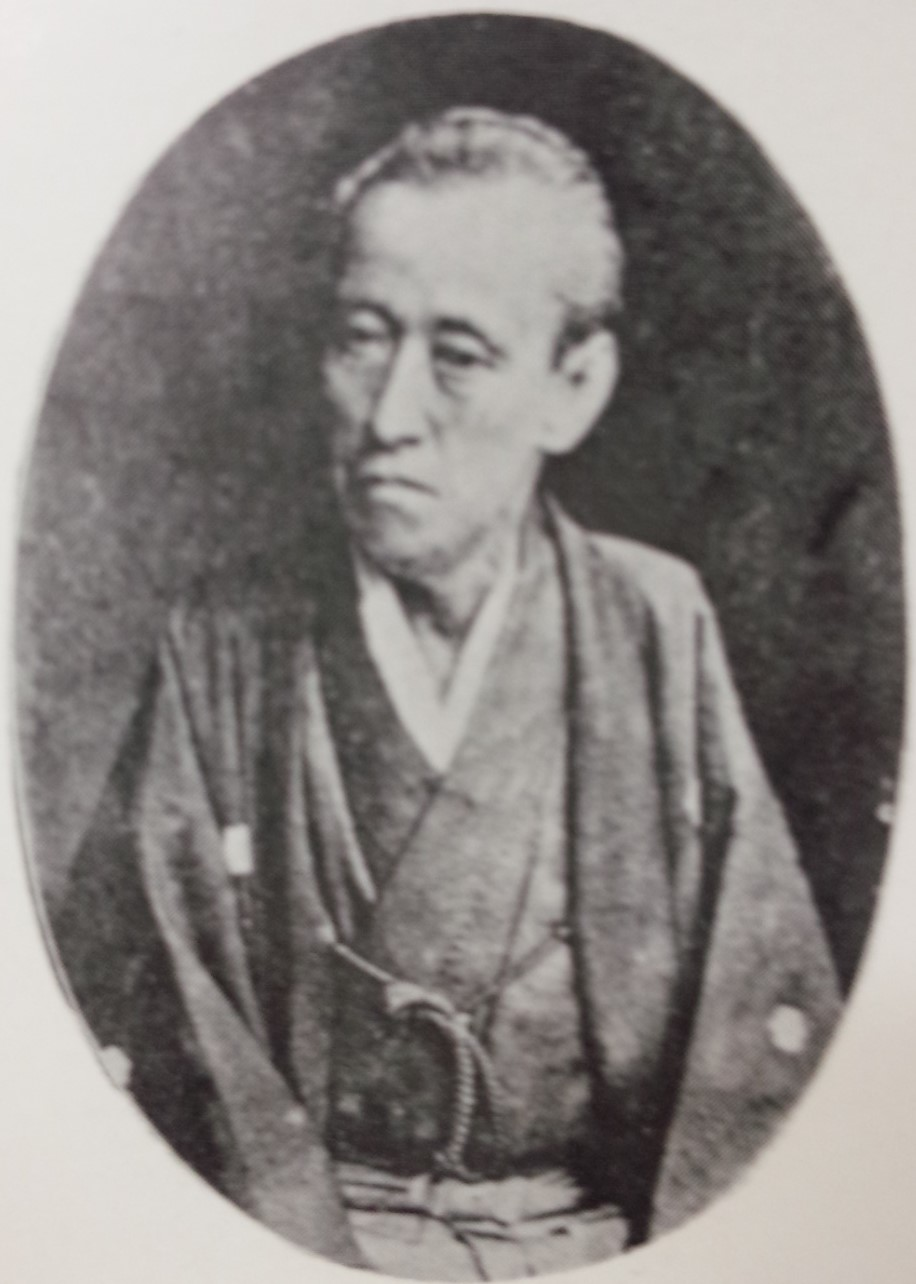
Matsudaira Yoshinori

Akashi Domain (明石藩, Akashi-han) was a feudal domain under the Tokugawa shogunate of Edo period Japan, located in Harima Province in what is now the southern portion of modern-day Hyōgo Prefecture. It was centered around Akashi Castle, which is located in what is now the city of Akashi, Hyōgo.

== History ==
At the start of the Edo period, the area around Akashi was part of the vast holdings of the Ikeda clan of Himeji Domain. In 1617, Ikeda Mitsumasa was transferred to Tottori Domain and his former estates were divided. Ogasawara Tadazane, the son-in-law of Matsudaira Nobuyasu received a 100,000 koku portion, which formed Akashi Domain, and he was ordered to construct a castle. Akashi Castle was located on a strategic location controlling the San'yōdō highway, which connected the Kinai region with western Japan and was also the main route north to Tanba and Tango Provinces. It was also located very near the coast of the Seto Inland Sea, overlooking the narrows to the island of Awaji island. Considered by the Tokugawa shogunate to be a backup to Himeji Castle, Akashi Castle was the final line to defend Kansai region against any attack from the west.

The Ogasawara clan were transferred to Kokura Domain in 1632, and due to the strategic nature of the domain, it was reassigned only to trusted cadet branches of fudai daimyō clans: the Toda-Matsudaira, Okubo clan, Fujii-Matsudaira clan and the Honda clan. After Honda Masatoshi was demoted for poor governance in 1682, the domain was entrusted to a Shinpan clan: the Echizen-Matsudaira, formerly of Ono Domain, which retained it to the Meiji restoration. The 8th daimyō, Matsudaira Narikoto, was an adopted heir and was born the 25th son of Shogun Tokugawa Ienari. As an indication of his status, the domain was increased in kokudaka from 60,000 to 80,000 koku and was given administrative control over an additional 20,000 koku of tenryō lands. However, this was not enough to offset the vast outlay of funds which the domain had been forced to pay the shogunate for the "privilege" of having the son of a Shogun as heir, and the domain faced financial difficulties. In the Bakumatsu period, the domain was ordered by the shogunate to construct twelve artillery batteries for coastal defense, and also to provide troops to man the defenses of Edo at Shinagawa and along the coast of Sagami Province. The domain also provided troops for the First Chōshū expedition in 1864 and Second Chōshū expedition in 1866. However at the start of the Boshin War, as Matsudaira Yoshinori was leading his armies in support of Tokugawa forces at the Battle of Toba-Fushimi, he received word that the Shogun Tokugawa Yoshinobu had abandoned his army and had fled Osaka by ship back to Edo. He decided to return to Akashi without combat and soon after defected to the Meiji government. His forces were ordered to fight in the Boshin War as part of the rear guard against Himeji Domain and in Echigo Province.

In 1871, with the abolition of the han system, Akashi Domain became Akashi Prefecture, and was incorporated into Hyōgo prefecture via Himeji Prefecture and Shikama Prefecture. The Echizen Matsudaira family became a viscount in the kazoku peerage system in 1884.

== Holdings at the end of the Edo period ==
Unlike most domains in the han system, which consisted of several discontinuous territories calculated to provide the assigned kokudaka, based on periodic cadastral surveys and projected agricultural yields, Akashi Domain was a single unified holding.

- Harima Province
  - 144 villages in Akashi District (entire district)
  - 70 villages in Mino District

== List of daimyō ==
#	Name	Tenure	Courtesy title	Court Rank	kokudaka
Ogasawara clan, 1617-1632 (Fudai)
1	Ogasawara Tadazane (小笠原忠真)	1617 - 1632	Sakon-no-shogen (左近将監); Jijū (侍従)	Junior 4th Rank, Lower Grade (従四位下)	100,000 koku
Toda-Matsudaira clan, 1633-1639 (Fudai)
2	Matsudaira Yasunao (松平庸直)	1633 - 1634	Tanba-no-kami (丹波守)	Junior 5th Rank, Lower Grade (従五位下)	70,000 koku
3	Matsudaira Mitsushige (松平光重)	1634 - 1639	Tanba-no-kami (丹波守)	Junior 5th Rank, Lower Grade (従五位下)	70,000 koku
Okubo clan, 1639-1649 (Fudai)
1	Okubo Tadamoto (大久保忠職)	1639 - 1649	Kaga-no-kami (加賀守)	Junior 4th Rank, Lower Grade (従四位下)	70,000 koku
Fujii-Matsudaira clan, 1649-1679 (Fudai)
1	Matsudaira Tadakuni (松平忠国)	1649 - 1659	Yamashiro-no-kami (山城守)	Junior 5th Rank, Lower Grade (従五位下)	70,000 koku
2	Matsudaira Nobuyuki (松平信之)	1659 - 1679	Hyuga-no-kami (日向守)	Junior 5th Rank, Lower Grade (従五位下)	65,000 koku
Honda clan, 1679-1682 (Fudai)
1	Honda Masatoshi (本多政利)	1679 - 1682	Izumo-no-kami (出雲守)	Junior 5th Rank, Lower Grade (従五位下)	60,000 koku
Echizen-Matsudaira clan, 1682-1871 (Shinpan)
1	Matsudaira Naoakira (松平直明)	1682 - 1701	Wakasa-no-kami (若狭守); Ichi-no-tsukasa (市司)	Junior 4th Rank, Lower Grade (従四位下)	60,000 koku
2	Matsudaira Naotsune (松平直常)	1701 - 1743	Sahyoe-no-kami (左兵衛督); Jijū (侍従); Tajima-no-kami (但馬守)	Junior 4th Rank, Lower Grade (従四位下)	60,000 koku
3	Matsudaira Naosumi (松平直純)	1743 - 1764	Sahyoe-no-kami (左兵衛督)	Junior 4th Rank, Lower Grade (従四位下)	60,000 koku
4	Matsudaira Naohiro (松平直泰)	1764 - 1784	Sahyoe-no-kami (左兵衛督); Wakasa-no-kami (若狭守)	Junior 4th Rank, Lower Grade (従四位下)	60,000 koku
5	Matsudaira Naoyuki (松平直之)	1784 - 1786	Sahyoe-no-kami (左兵衛督))	Junior 5th Rank, Lower Grade (従五位下)	60,000 koku
6	Matsudaira Naochika (松平直周)	1786 - 1816	Okura-taiyu (大蔵大輔)	Junior 4th Rank, Lower Grade (従四位下)	60,000 koku
7	Matsudaira Naritsugu (松平斉韶)	1816 - 1840	Sakon'egon-no-shosho (左近衛権少将); Jijū (侍従)	Junior 4th Rank, Upper Grade (従四位上)	60,000 koku
8	Matsudaira Narikoto (松平斉宣)	1840 - 1844	Sakon'e-gon-no-shosho (左近衛権少将)	Junior 4th Rank, Upper Grade (従四位上)	60,000 -> 80,000 -> 100,000 koku
9	Matsudaira Yoshinori (松平慶憲)	1844 - 1869	Sakon'e-gon-no-chusho (左近衛権少将); Jijū (侍従)	Junior 4th Rank, Upper Grade (従四位上)	100,000 koku
10	Matsudaira Naomune (松平直致)	1869 - 1871	Sakon'egon-no-shosho (左近衛権少将); Jijū (侍従)	Junior 4th Rank, Upper Grade (従四位上)	100,000 koku

=== Simplified genealogy (Matsudaira) ===
- Matsudaira Naomitsu, 3rd head of the Matsudaira (c. 1400 – c. 1488–89)
  - Chikatada, 4th head of the Matsudaira (c. 1431–1531)
    - Nagachika, 5th head of the Matsudaira (1473–1544)
      - Nobutada, 6th head of the Matsudaira (1490–1531)
        - Kiyoyasu, 7th head of the Matsudaira (1511–1536)
          - Hirotada, 8th head of the Matsudaira (1526–1549)
            - Tokugawa Ieyasu, 1st Tokugawa shōgun (1543–1616; r. 1603–1605)
              - Kame-hime (1560-1625), m. Okudaira Nobumasa, 1st daimyō of Kanō (1555–1615)
                - daughter, m. Ōkubo Tadatsune, 1st daimyō of Kisai (1580–1611)
                  - Ōkubo Tadamoto, daimyō of Akashi (1604–1670)
              - Yūki (Matsudaira) Hideyasu, 1st daimyō of Fukui (1574–1607)
                - Naoyoshi, Lord of Ōno (1605-1678)
                  - I. Naoakira, 1st daimyō of Akashi (3rd creation) (1656–1721; Lord of Akashi: 1682–1701)
                    - II. Naotsune, 2nd daimyō of Akashi (3rd creation) (1679–1744; r. 1701–1743)
                      - III. Naosumi, 3rd daimyō of Akashi (3rd creation) (1727–1764; r. 1743–1764)
                        - IV. Naohiro, 4th daimyō of Akashi (3rd creation) (1749–1804; r. 1764–1784)
                          - V. Naoyuki, 5th daimyō of Akashi (3rd creation) (1768–1786; r. 1784–1786)
                          - VI. Naochika, 6th daimyō of Akashi (3rd creation) (1773–1828; r. 1786–1816)
                            - VII. Naritsugu, 7th daimyō of Akashi (3rd creation) (1803–1868; r. 1816–1840)
                              - IX. Yoshinori, 9th daimyō of Akashi (3rd creation) (1826–1897; r. 1844–1869)
                                - X. Naomune, 10th daimyō of Akashi (3rd creation) (1849–1884; Lord: 1869; Governor: 1869–1871)
              - Tokugawa Yorinobu, 1st daimyō of Kishū (1602–1671)
                - Tokugawa Mitsusada, 2nd daimyō of Kishū (1627–1705)
                  - Tokugawa Yoshimune, 8th Tokugawa shōgun (1684–1751; 5th Lord of Kishū: 1705–1716; 8th Tokugawa shōgun: 1716–1745)
                    - Tokugawa Munetada, 1st Hitotsubashi-Tokugawa family head (1721–1765)
                      - Tokugawa Harusada, 2nd Hitotsubashi-Tokugawa family head (1751–1827)
                        - Tokugawa Ienari, 11th Tokugawa shōgun (1773–1841; r. 1786–1837)
                          - VIII. Matsudaira Narikoto, 8th daimyō of Akashi (3rd creation) (1825–1844; r. 1840–1844)
              - Tokugawa Yorifusa, 1st daimyō of Mito (1603–1661)
                - daughter, m. Honda Masatoshi, daimyō of Akashi (1641–1707)
      - Nobusada (d. 1538)
        - Kiyosada
          - Ietsugu (d. 1563)
            - Tadayoshi (1559–1582)
              - Nobuyoshi, daimyō of Sasayama (1580–1620)
                - I. Tadakuni, 1st daimyō of Akashi (2nd creation) (1597–1659; Lord of Akashi: 1649–1659)
                  - II. Nobuyuki, 2nd daimyō of Akashi (2nd creation) (1631–1686; r. 1659–1679)
  - daughter, m. Toda Munemitsu (1439–1508)
    - Toda Norimitsu
      - Toda Masamitsu
        - Toda Yasumitsu (d. 1547)
          - Toda Yoshimitsu
            - Toda Tadashige
              - Matsudaira Yasunaga, daimyō of Matsumoto (1562–1633)
                - Tadamitsu (1598–1629)
                  - II. Mitsushige, 2nd daimyō of Akashi (1st creation) (1622–1668; r. 1634–1639)
                - I. Yasunao, 1st daimyō of Akashi (1st creation) (1617–1634; Lord of Akashi: cr. 1633)

== See also ==
- List of Han
- Abolition of the han system
