= Ogasawara Tadazane =

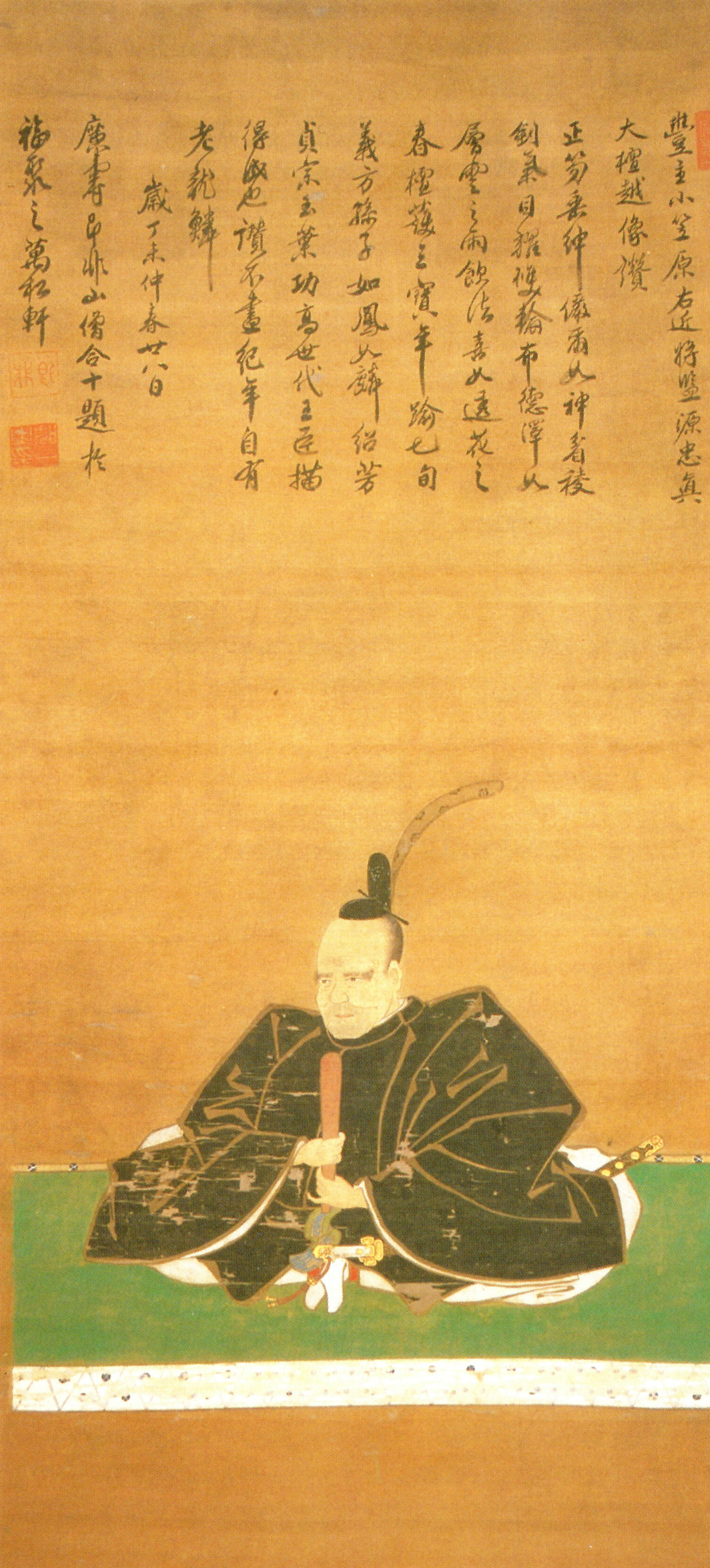

Ogasawara Tadazane (小笠原 忠真, March 26, 1596 – December 3, 1667) was a Japanese samurai daimyō of the early Edo period.

== Early life ==
The emblem (mon) of the Ogasawara clan

Tadazane was the son of Ogasawara Hidemasa (1569–1615) with Toku-hime, daughter of Matsudaira Nobuyasu and granddaughter of Tokugawa Ieyasu. He married Kamehime, daughter of Honda Tadamasa with Kamehime (daughter of Matsudaira Nobuyasu) and adopted daughter of Tokugawa Ieyasu.

== Daimyo ==
Following the deaths of his father and elder brother in the Osaka Summer Campaign, his holdings were transferred from Akashi Domain (100,000 koku) in Harima Province to the Kokura Domain (150,000 koku) Buzen Province.

Famed as the lord who employed Miyamoto Musashi's adopted son Iori, Tadazane took part in the Shogunate's campaign to quell the Shimabara Rebellion, where the Kokura forces assisted in the execution of survivors of the rebel force, predominantly Christians.

Tadazane's son Tadataka succeeded him. Other children included Nagayasu, Naganobu, Sanekata, and three daughters (one of them adopted from the Hachisuka clan of Tokushima-han).

== See also ==
- Ogasawara clan

| Preceded by Ogasawara Hidemasa | Daimyō of Matsushiro; 1615–1617 | Succeeded by Matsudaira Yasunaga |
| Preceded by none | Daimyō of Akashi; 1617–1632 | Succeeded by Matsudaira Tsunenao |
| Preceded by Hosokawa Tadatoshi | Daimyō of Kokura; 1632–1667 | Succeeded by Ogasawara Tadakatsu |
