= Yusubaru Station =

Railway station in Aka, Fukuoka Prefecture, Japan

Yusubaru Station 油須原駅
- Station entrance

General information
- Location: 4865-2 Aka, Aka-mura, Tagawa-gun, Fukuoka-ken 824-0431; Japan
- Coordinates: 33.6127°N 130.8842°E
- Operator: Heisei Chikuhō Railway
- Line: ■ Tagawa Line
- Distance: 16.9 km (from Yukuhashi Station)
- Platforms: 2 side platforms

Construction
- Structure type: At-grade

Other information
- Status: Unstaffed
- Station code: HC21
- Website: Official website

History
- Opened: 15 August 1895

Services
Preceding station	Heisei Chikuhō Railway	Following station
Genjiinomori towards Yukuhashi	Tagawa Line	Aka towards Tagawa-Ita
Location
- Location within Fukuoka Prefecture Location within Japan

Yusubaru Station (油須原駅, Yusubaru-eki) is a passenger railway station located in the village of Aka, Fukuoka Prefecture, Japan. It is operated by the third-sector railway operator Heisei Chikuhō Railway.

== Lines ==
Yusubaru Station is served by the Tagawa and is located 16.0 km from the starting point of the line at Yukuhashi.Trains arrive roughly every 30 minutes.

== Layout ==
The station consists of two opposed unnumbered side platforms connected by a level crossing. The wooden station building has been in place since the station opened. The station building was renovated in February 2022 as part of an industry-academia-government collaboration project with the cooperation of Nishi-Nippon Institute of Technology to reflect its appearance at the time of opening.

== Platforms ==
North	■ ■ Tagawa Line	for Saigawa, Toyotsu, Yukuhashi
South	■ ■ Tagawa Line	for Tagawa-Ita, Kanada, Nōgata

== History ==
Yusubaru Station opened on 15 August 1895 as a station on the private Hōshū Railway. The Hōshū railway was acquired by the Kyushu Railway on 3 September 1901. The Kyushu Railway was nationalised on 1 July 1907. Japanese Government Railways (JGR), designated the track as the Hōshū Main Line on 12 October 1909 and expanded it southwards in phases. With the privatization of Japanese National Railways (JNR), the successor of JGR, on 1 April 1987, the station came under the control of JR Kyushu. It was transferred to the control of the Heisei Chikuhō Railway on 1 October 1989.

== Surrounding area ==
The station is located in the urban center of Aka Village, with many shops and residences surrounding it.

== See also ==
- List of railway stations in Japan
