= Toyotsu Station (Fukuoka) =

Railway station in Yukuhashi, Fukuoka Prefecture, Japan

Toyotsu Station 豊津駅
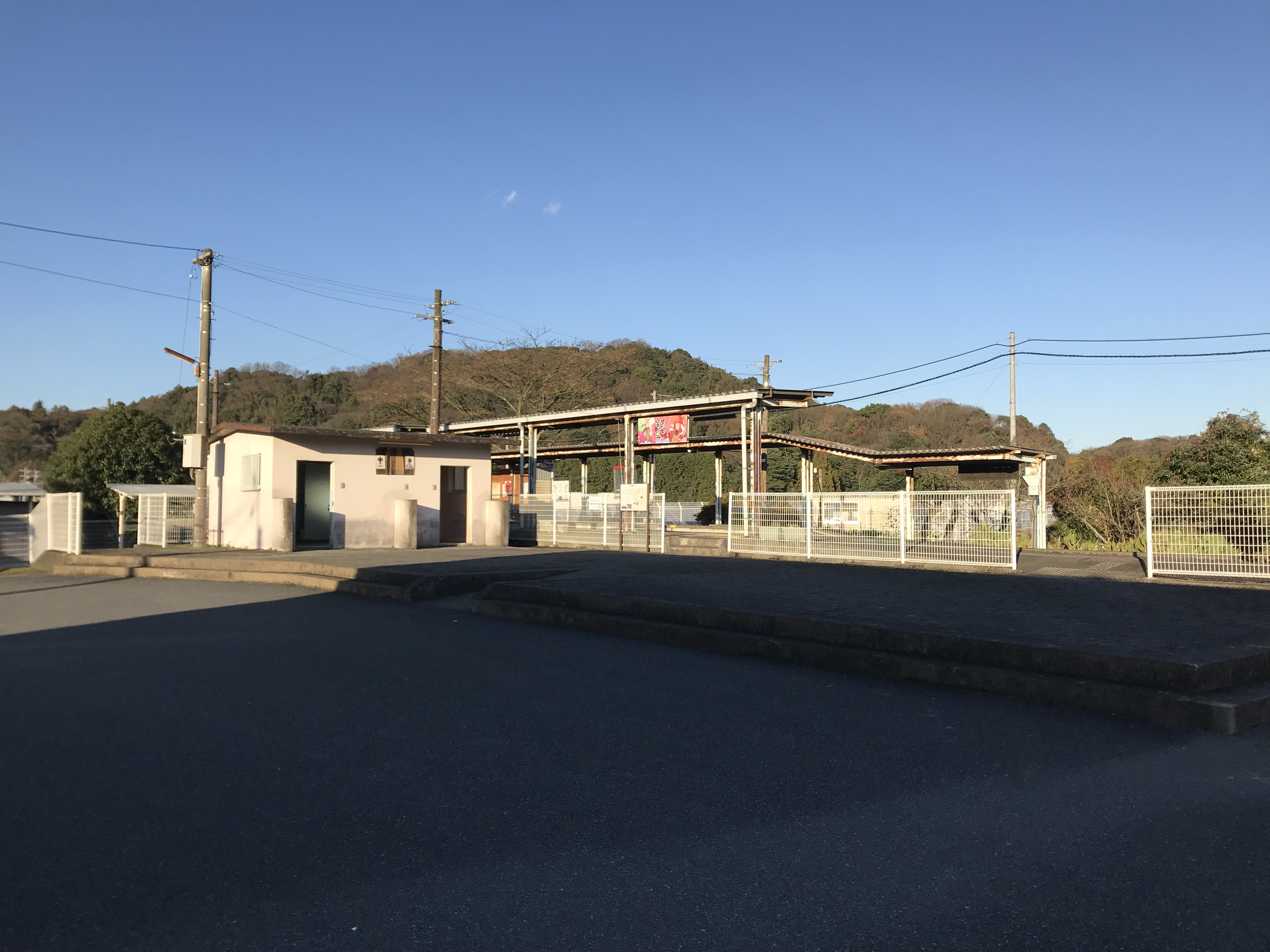
- Station entrance

General information
- Location: Yadome 68, Yukuhashi-shi, Fukuoka-ken 824-0037; Japan
- Coordinates: 33.6873°N 130.9630°E
- Operator: Heisei Chikuhō Railway
- Line: ■ Tagawa Line
- Distance: 4.9 km (from Yukuhashi Station)
- Platforms: 2 side platforms

Construction
- Structure type: At-grade

Other information
- Status: Unstaffed
- Station code: HC27
- Website: Official website

History
- Opened: 15 August 1895

Services
Preceding station	Heisei Chikuhō Railway	Following station
Imagawa-Kappa towards Yukuhashi	Tagawa Line	Shin-Toyotsu towards Tagawa-Ita
Location
- Location within Fukuoka Prefecture Location within Japan

Toyotsu Station (豊津駅, Toyotsu-eki) is a passenger railway station located in the city of Yukuhashi, Fukuoka Prefecture, Japan. It is operated by the third-sector railway operator Heisei Chikuhō Railway. On 1 April 2009, a construction company headquartered in nearby Miyako, Santomi (サントミ), acquired naming rights to the station. Therefore, the station is alternatively known as Santomi Toyotsu Station (サントミ 豊津駅).

== Lines ==
Toyotsu Station is served by the Tagawa and is located 4.9 km from the starting point of the line at Yukuhashi.Trains arrive roughly every 30 minutes.

== Layout ==
The station consists of two opposed unnumbered side platforms connected by a level crossing. There is no station building, but only a shelter on each platform. The station is unattended.

=== Platforms ===
West	■ ■ Tagawa Line	for Saigawa, Tagawa-Ita, Nōgata
East	■ ■ Tagawa Line	for Miyakoizumi, Yukuhashi

== Gallery ==
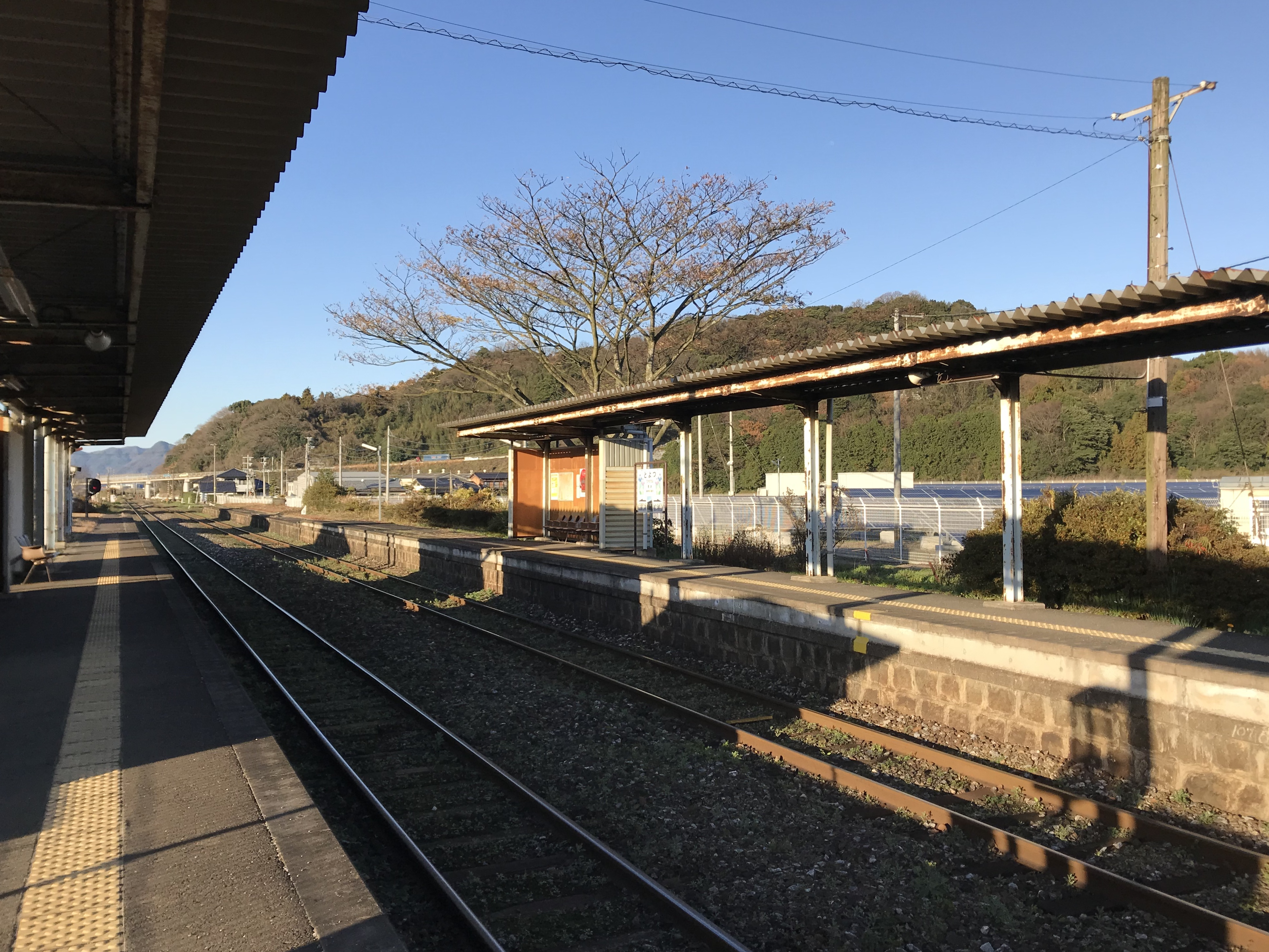
View of station platforms

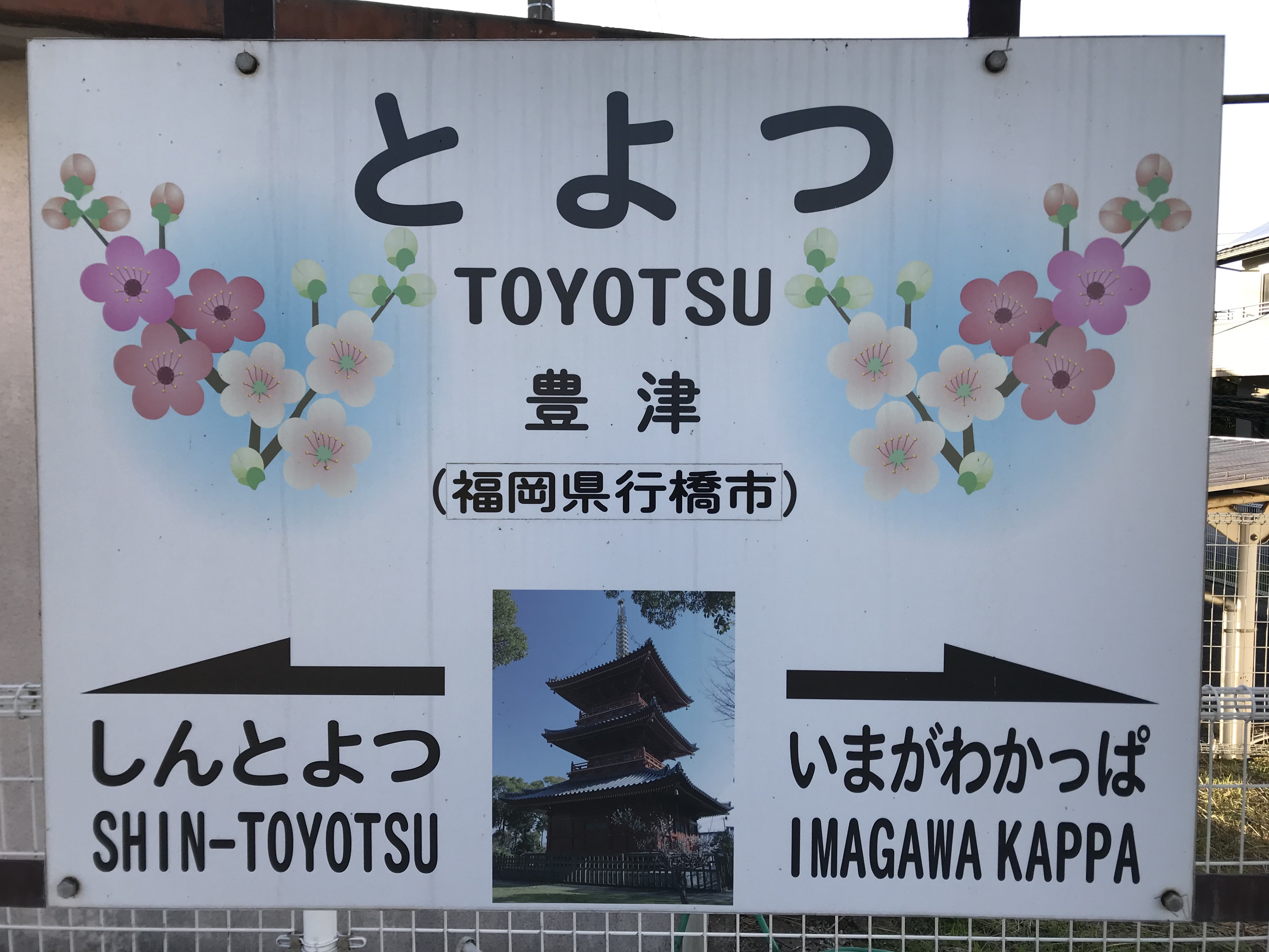
Station sign

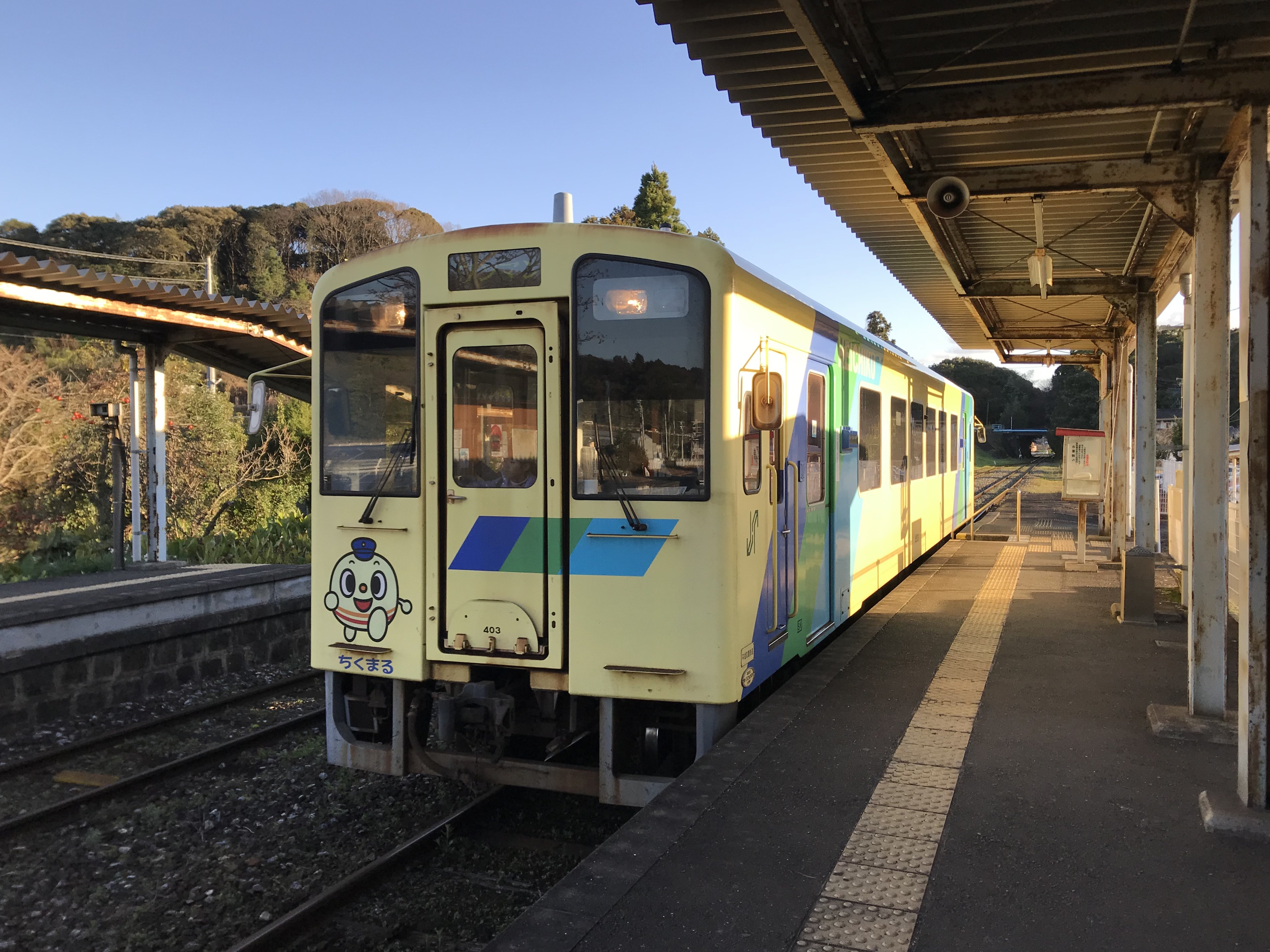
A Yukuhashi-bound train at Toyotsu Station

== History ==
The station was opened on 15 August 1895 with the opening of the private Hōshū Railway. The Hōshū railway was acquired by the Kyushu Railway on 3 September 1901. The Kyushu Railway was nationalised on 1 July 1907. Japanese Government Railways (JGR), designated the track as the Hōshū Main Line on 12 October 1909 and expanded it southwards in phases. With the privatization of Japanese National Railways (JNR), the successor of JGR, on 1 April 1987, the station came under the control of JR Kyushu. It was transferred to the control of the Heisei Chikuhō Railway on 1 October 1989.

== Surrounding area ==
- Japan National Route 496
- Goshogatani Kōgoishi

== See also ==
- List of railway stations in Japan
