= Shin-Toyotsu Station =

Railway station in Miyako, Fukuoka Prefecture, Japan

Shin-Toyotsu Station 新豊津駅
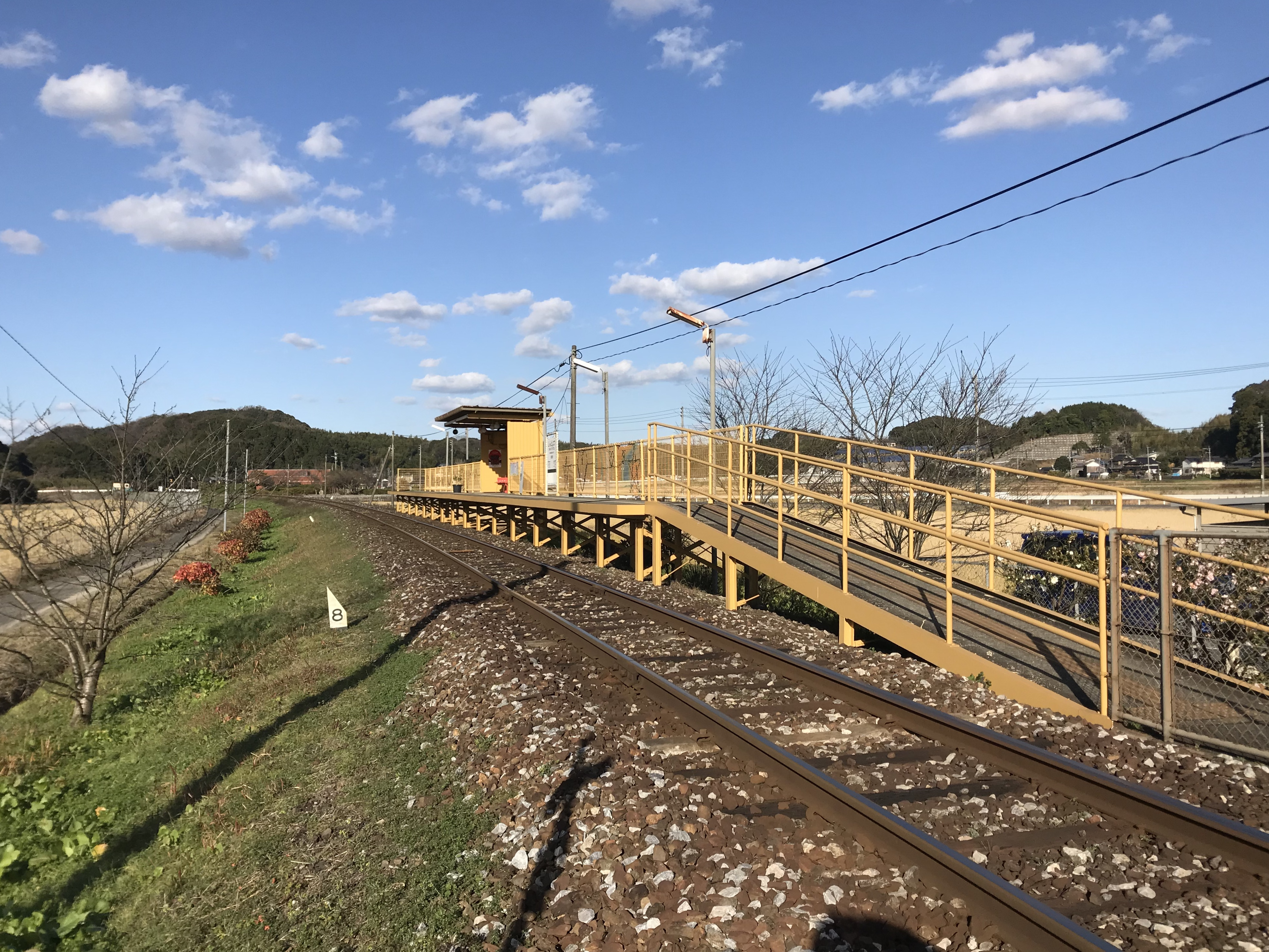
- Station platform

General information
- Location: 523-2 Hikotoku, Miyako-cho, Kyoto-gun, Fukuoka-ken; Japan
- Coordinates: 33.6797°N 130.9639°E
- Operator: Heisei Chikuhō Railway
- Line: ■ Tagawa Line
- Distance: 5.8 km (from Yukuhashi Station)
- Platforms: 1 side platform

Construction
- Structure type: At-grade

Other information
- Status: Unstaffed
- Station code: HC26
- Website: Official website

History
- Opened: 1 October 1990

Services
Preceding station	Heisei Chikuhō Railway	Following station
Toyotsu towards Yukuhashi	Tagawa Line	Higashi-Saigawa-Sanshirō towards Tagawa-Ita
Location
- Location within Fukuoka Prefecture Location within Japan

Shin-Toyotsu Station (新豊津駅, Shintoyotsu-eki) is a passenger railway station located in the town of Miyako, Fukuoka Prefecture, Japan. It is operated by the third-sector railway operator Heisei Chikuhō Railway. On 1 April 2009, a software development company headquartered in Hachiōji, Tokyo, Energysoft (エナジーソフト), acquired naming rights to the station. Therefore, the station is alternatively known as Energysoft Shin-Toyotsu Station (エナジーソフト 新豊津駅, Enajiisofuto-Toyotsu-eki).

== Lines ==
Shin-Toyotsu Station is served by the Tagawa and is located 5.8 km from the starting point of the line at Yukuhashi.Trains arrive roughly every 30 minutes.

== Layout ==
The station consists of one side platform serving a single bi-directional track. There is no station building, but only a shelter on the platform. The station is unattended.

== Gallery ==
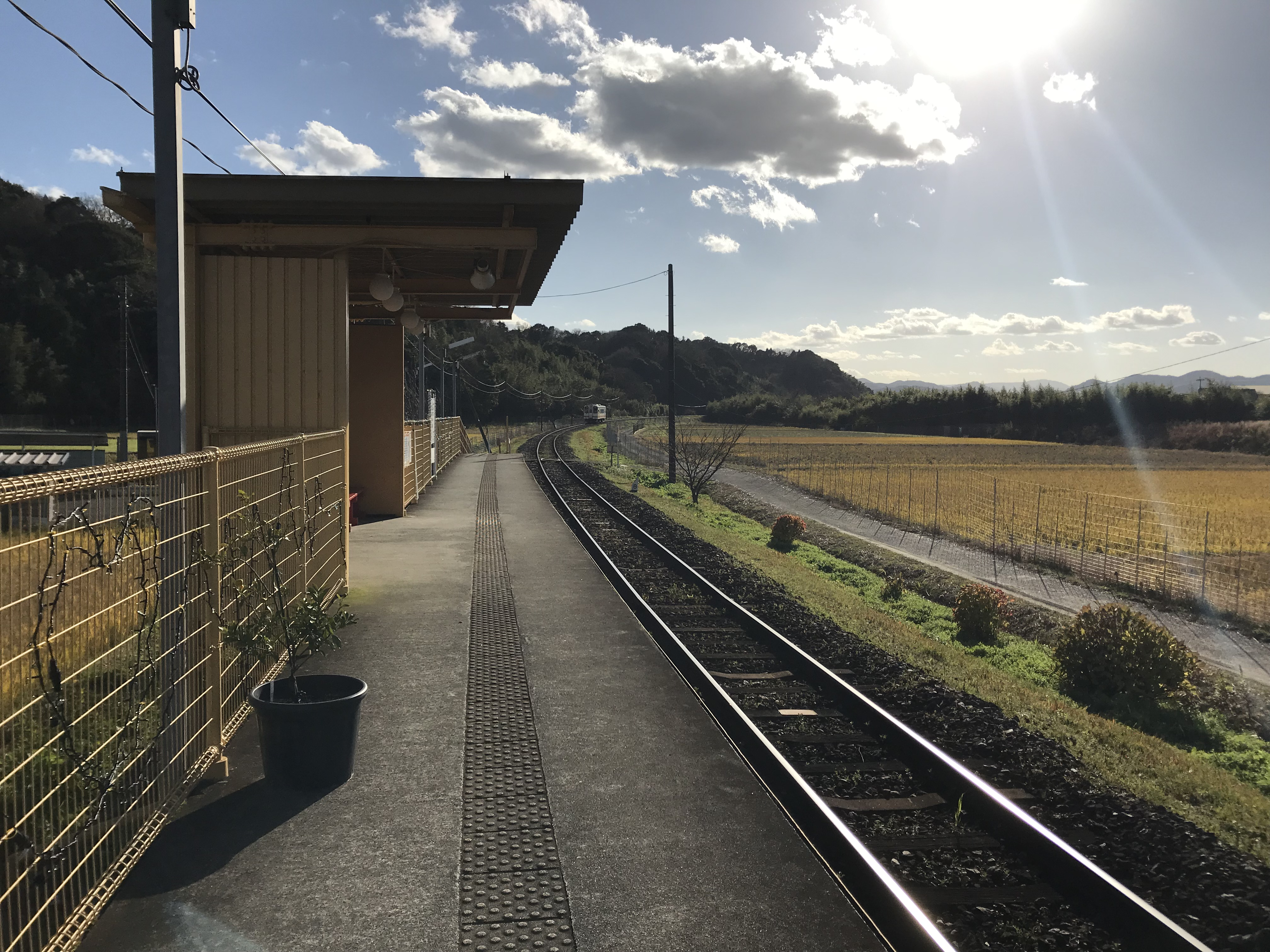
View of station platform

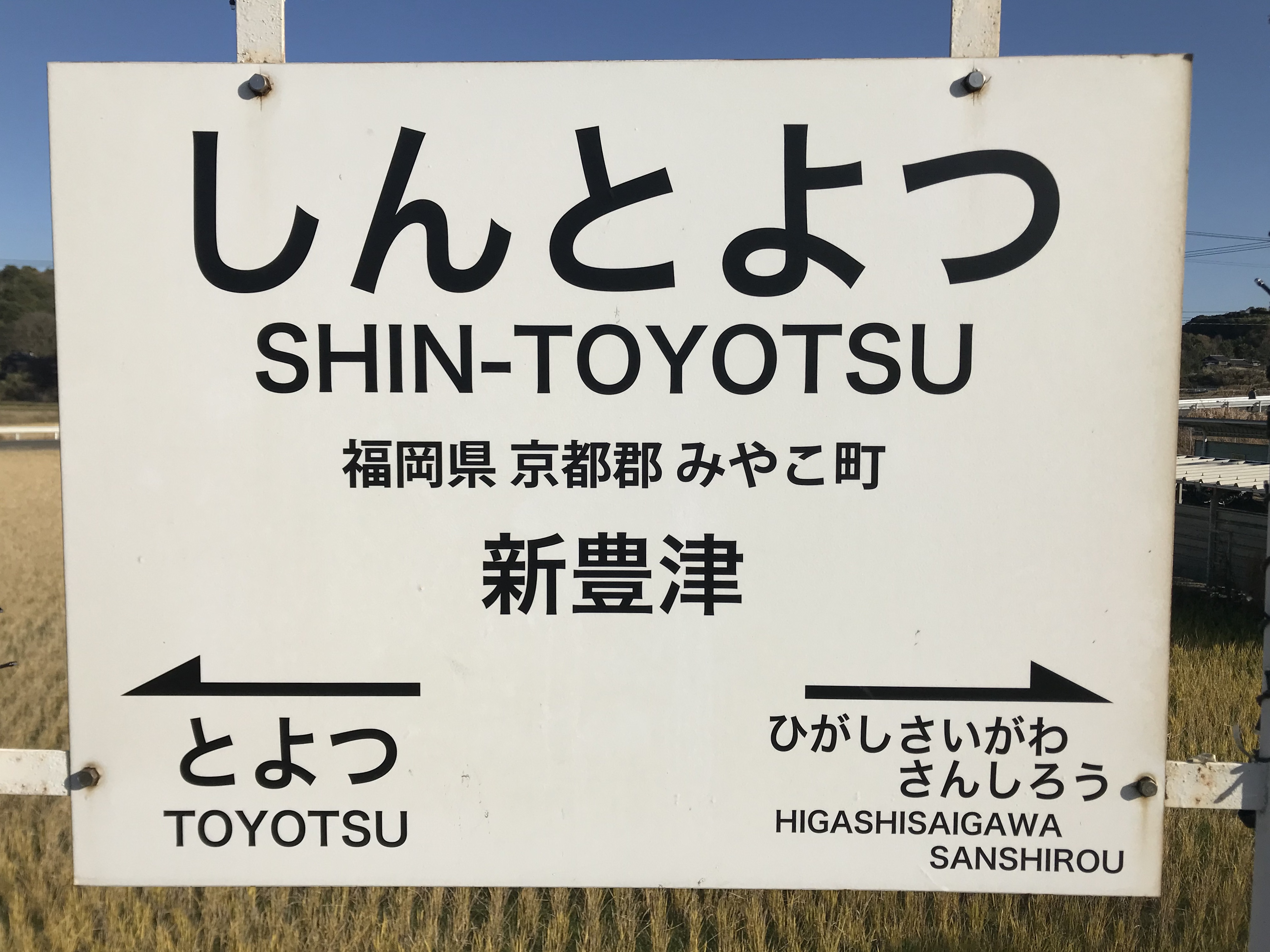
Station sign

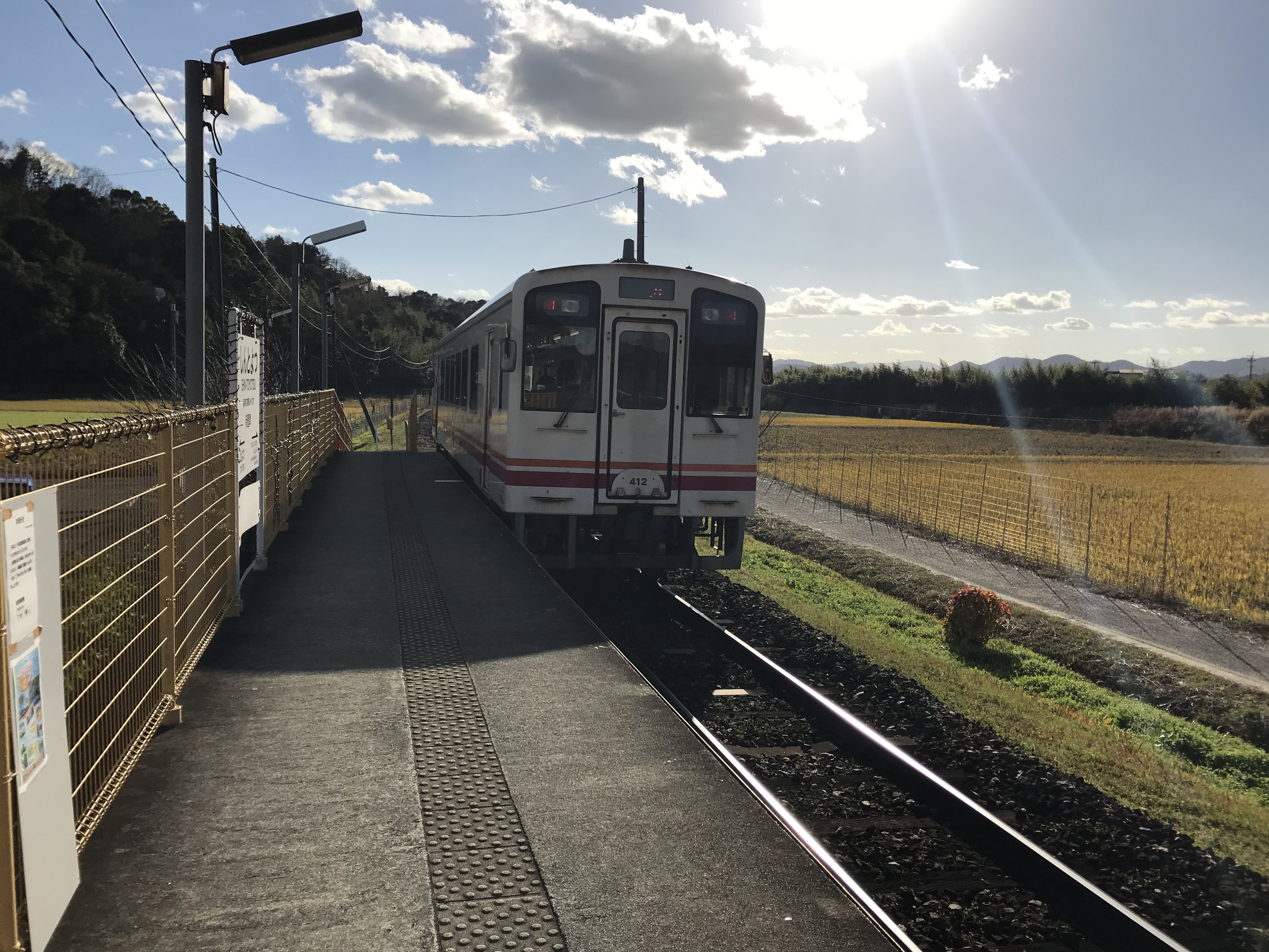
A Nōgata-bound train at Shin-Toyotsu Station

== History ==
The station was opened on 1 October 1990.

== Surrounding area ==
- Miyako Town Toyotsu Elementary School
- Japan National Route 496

== See also ==
- List of railway stations in Japan
