= Sakiyama Station =

Railway station in Miyako, Fukuoka Prefecture, Japan

Sakiyama Station 崎山駅
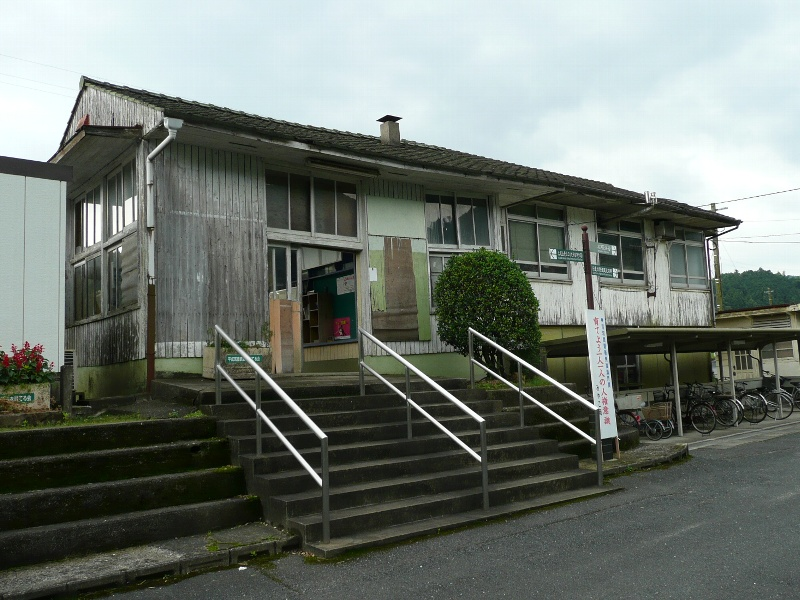
- Station entrance

General information
- Location: 3079-2 Saigawasakiyama, Miyako-cho, Miyako-gun, Fukuoka-ken 824-0224; Japan
- Coordinates: 33.6362°N 130.9178°E
- Operator: Heisei Chikuhō Railway
- Line: ■ Tagawa Line
- Distance: 12.4 km (from Yukuhashi Station)
- Platforms: 2 side platforms

Construction
- Structure type: At-grade

Other information
- Status: Unstaffed
- Station code: HC23
- Website: Official website

History
- Opened: 11 August 1956

Services
Preceding station	Heisei Chikuhō Railway	Following station
Saigawa towards Yukuhashi	Tagawa Line	Genjiinomori towards Tagawa-Ita
Location
- Location within Fukuoka Prefecture Location within Japan

Sakiyama Station (崎山駅, Sakiyama-eki) is a passenger railway station located in the town of Miyako, Fukuoka Prefecture, Japan. It is operated by the third-sector railway operator Heisei Chikuhō Railway. On 1 April 2009, an advertising agency headquartered in Tokyo, Planning Advertising Cooperative Association (企画・宣伝協同組合), acquired naming rights to the station. Therefore, the station is alternatively known as Reimeiken.con Sakiyama Station (れいめい拳.com 崎山駅).

== Lines ==
Sakiyama Station is served by the Tagawa and is located 12.4 km from the starting point of the line at Yukuhashi.Trains arrive roughly every 30 minutes.

== Layout ==
The station consists of two opposed side platforms connected by a level crossing. The station is unattended.

=== Platforms ===
1	■ ■ Tagawa Line	for Tagawa-Ita, Nōgata
2	■ ■ Tagawa Line	for Saigawa, Yukuhashi

== History ==
Sakiyama Signal Station opened on the Japan National Railway (JNR) Tagawa Line on 20 April 1954. It was promoted to a full passenger station on 11 August 1956. With the privatization of Japanese National Railways on 1 April 1987, the station came under the control of JR Kyushu. It was transferred to the control of the Heisei Chikuhō Railway on 1 October 1989.

== Surrounding area ==
- Fukuoka Prefectural Route 34 Bridge Soeda Line
- Sakiyama Agricultural Training Center

== See also ==
- List of railway stations in Japan
