= Imagawa-Kappa Station =

Railway station in Yukuhashi, Fukuoka Prefecture, Japan

Imagawa-Kappa Station 今川河童駅
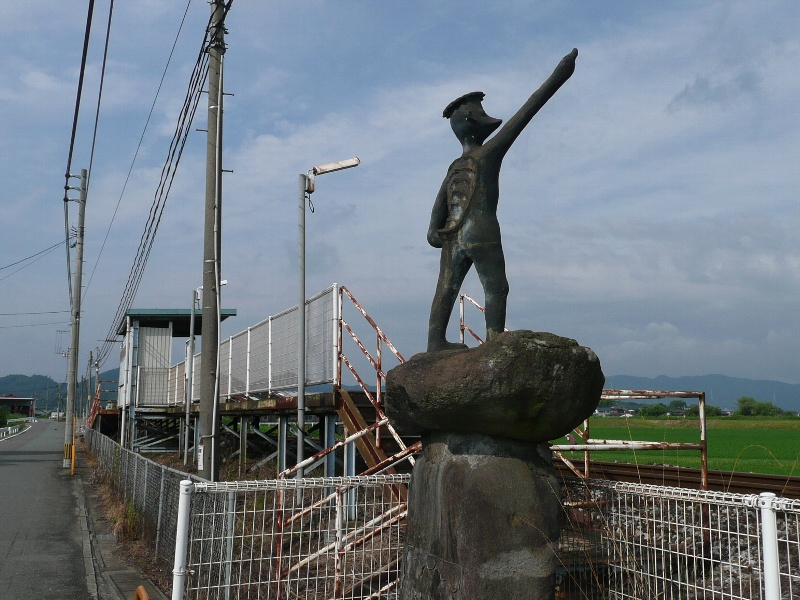
- Statue of a kappa near the station entrance

General information
- Location: 1380-2 Nagasue, Yukuhashi-shi, Fukuoka-ken; Japan
- Coordinates: 33.7031°N 130.9656°E
- Operator: Heisei Chikuhō Railway
- Line: ■ Tagawa Line
- Distance: 3.0 km (from Yukuhashi Station)
- Platforms: 1 side platform

Construction
- Structure type: At-grade

Other information
- Status: Unstaffed
- Station code: HC28
- Website: Official website

History
- Opened: 1 October 1990

Services
Preceding station	Heisei Chikuhō Railway	Following station
Miyakoizumi towards Yukuhashi	Tagawa Line	Toyotsu towards Tagawa-Ita
Location
- Location within Fukuoka Prefecture Location within Japan

Imagawa-Kappa Station (今川河童駅, Imagawa-Kappa-eki) is a passenger railway station located in the city of Yukuhashi, Fukuoka Prefecture, Japan. It is operated by the third-sector railway operator Heisei Chikuhō Railway. On 1 April 2009, the Yukuhashi branch of a Yamaguchi-based insurance agency, Hoken Hiroba (保険ひろば), acquired naming rights to the station. Therefore, the station is alternatively known as Hoken Hiroba Youme Town Yukuhashi Branch Imagawa-Kappa Station (保険ひろばゆめタウン行橋店 今川河童駅, Hoken-Hiroba-Yumetaun-Yukuhashi-ten-Imagawa-Kappa-eki).

== Lines ==
Imagawa-Kappa is served by the Tagawa Line and is located 3.0 km from the starting point of the line at Yukuhashi. Trains arrive roughly every 30 minutes.

== Layout ==
The station consists of one side platform serving a single bi-directional track. There is no station building, but only a shelter on the platform. The station is unattended. The station name references a kappa, a creature in Japanese folklore.

== History ==
The station was opened on 1 October 1990.

== Surrounding area ==
- Fukuoka Prefectural Route 34 Bridge Soeda Line
- Higashikyushu Expressway Imagawa Parking Area

== See also ==
- List of railway stations in Japan
