= Kakishita Onsenguchi Station =

Railway station in Kawara, Fukuoka Prefecture, Japan

Kakishita Onsenguchi Station 柿下温泉口駅
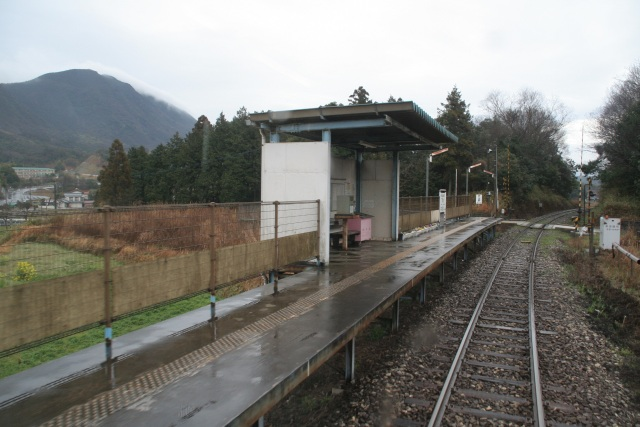
- Station platform

General information
- Location: 1034-2 Kakishita, Kawara-machi, Tagawa-gun, Fukuoka-ken 822-1404; Japan
- Coordinates: 33°39′5.68″N 130°51′15.68″E
- Operator: Heisei Chikuhō Railway
- Line: ■ Tagawa Line
- Distance: 22.5 km (from Yukuhashi Station)
- Platforms: 1 side platform

Construction
- Structure type: At-grade

Other information
- Status: Unstaffed
- Station code: HB18
- Website: Official website

History
- Opened: 18 March 1993

Services
Preceding station	Heisei Chikuhō Railway	Following station
Uchida towards Yukuhashi	Tagawa Line	Magarikane towards Tagawa-Ita
Location

Kakishita Onsenguchi Station (柿下温泉口駅, Kakishita Onsenguchi-eki) is a passenger railway station located in the town of Kawara, Fukuoka Prefecture, Japan. It is operated by the third-sector railway operator Heisei Chikuhō Railway.

== Lines ==
Kakishita Onsenguchi Station is served by the Tagawa and is located 22.5 km from the starting point of the line at Yukuhashi. Trains arrive roughly every 30 minutes.

== Layout ==
The station consists of one side platform serving a single bi-directional track. There is no station building, and the station is unattended.

== History ==
The station was opened on 18 March 1993.

== Surrounding area ==
- Kakinoshita Onsen (Closed)

== See also ==
- List of railway stations in Japan
