= Aka Station =

Railway station in Aka, Fukuoka Prefecture, Japan

Aka Station 赤駅
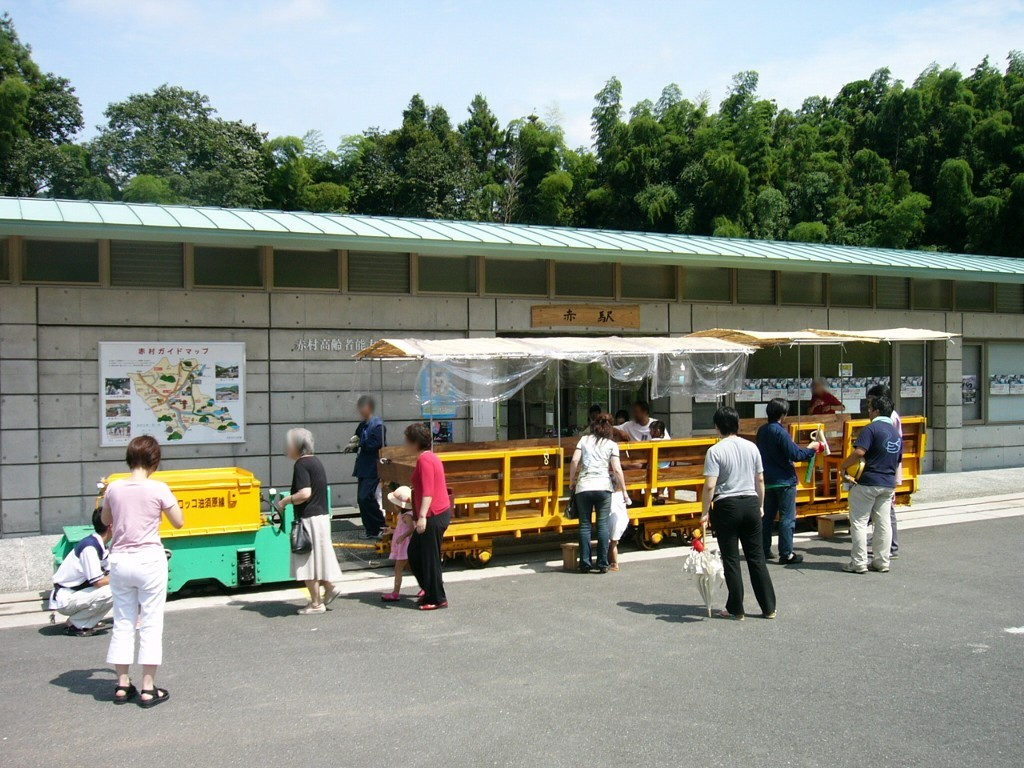
- Station entrance with electric tourist train

General information
- Location: 1166-2 Uchida, Aka-mura, Tagawa-gun, Fukuoka-ken 824-0432; Japan
- Coordinates: 33.6183°N 130.8717°E
- Operator: Heisei Chikuhō Railway
- Line: ■ Tagawa Line
- Distance: 18.4 km (from Yukuhashi Station)
- Platforms: 1 side platform

Construction
- Structure type: At-grade

Other information
- Status: Unstaffed
- Station code: HC20
- Website: Official website

History
- Opened: 15 March 2003

Services
Preceding station	Heisei Chikuhō Railway	Following station
Yusubaru towards Yukuhashi	Tagawa Line	Uchida towards Tagawa-Ita
Location
- Location within Fukuoka Prefecture Location within Japan

Aka Station (赤駅, Aka-eki) is a passenger railway station located in the village of Aka, Fukuoka Prefecture, Japan. It is operated by the third-sector railway operator Heisei Chikuhō Railway.

== Lines ==
Aka Station is served by the Tagawa and is located 18.4 km from the starting point of the line at Yukuhashi.Trains arrive roughly every 30 minutes.

== Layout ==
The station consists of one side platforms serving a single bi-directional track. The station building also houses the Akamura Chamber of Commerce and Industry. The station is unattended.

== History ==
Aka Station opened on 15 March 2003. This station is the intersection between the Tagawa Line and the incomplete Yusubaru Line. Construction for the line, which was planned to connect to Urushio Station (now defunct), was halted due to the decrease of coal production and low projected ridership. The town of Aka currently operates a seasonal electric train on a short segment of the track for tourism.

== Surrounding area ==
- Aka Village Hall

== See also ==
- List of railway stations in Japan
