= Higashi-Saigawa-Sanshirō Station =

Railway station in Miyako, Fukuoka Prefecture, Japan

Higashi-Saigawa-Sanshirō Station 東犀川三四郎駅
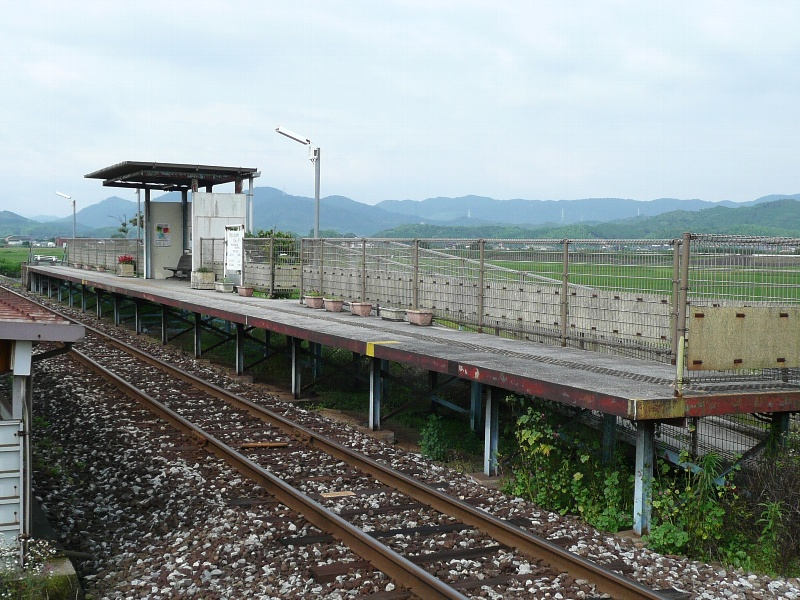
- Station platform

General information
- Location: Saigawazokumyoin, Miyako-cho, Miyako-gun, Fukuokaken 824-0203; Japan
- Coordinates: 33.6616°N 130.9490°E
- Operator: Heisei Chikuhō Railway
- Line: ■ Tagawa Line
- Distance: 8.2 km (from Yukuhashi Station)
- Platforms: 1 side platform

Construction
- Structure type: At-grade

Other information
- Status: Unstaffed
- Station code: HC25
- Website: Official website

History
- Opened: 18 March 1993

Services
| Preceding station | Heisei Chikuhō Railway | Following station |
|---|---|---|
| Shin-Toyotsu towards Yukuhashi | Tagawa Line | Saigawa towards Tagawa-Ita |
Location
- Location within Fukuoka Prefecture Location within Japan

Higashi-Saigawa-Sanshirō Station (東犀川三四郎駅, Higashi-Saigawa-Sanshirō-eki) is a passenger railway station located in the town of Miyako, Fukuoka Prefecture, Japan. It is operated by the third-sector railway operator Heisei Chikuhō Railway. The station name pays tribute to Toyotaka Komiya, a Japanese literary critic and student of writer Natsume Sōseki. Born in Miyako, Komiya is known as the model for the character of Sanshirō in Sōseki's novel of the same name.

== Lines ==
Higashi-Saigawa-Sanshirō Station is served by the Tagawa and is located 8.2 km from the starting point of the line at Yukuhashi.Trains arrive roughly every 30 minutes.

== Layout ==
The station consists of one side platform serving a single bi-directional track. There is no station building, but only a shelter on the platform. The station is unattended.

== History ==
The station was opened on 18 March 1993.

== Surrounding area ==
- Fukuoka Prefectural Route 34 Bridge Soeda Line

== See also ==
- List of railway stations in Japan
