= Reiwa Costa Yukuhashi Station =

Railway station in Yukuhashi, Fukuoka Prefecture, Japan

Reiwa Costa Yukuhashi Station 令和コスタ行橋
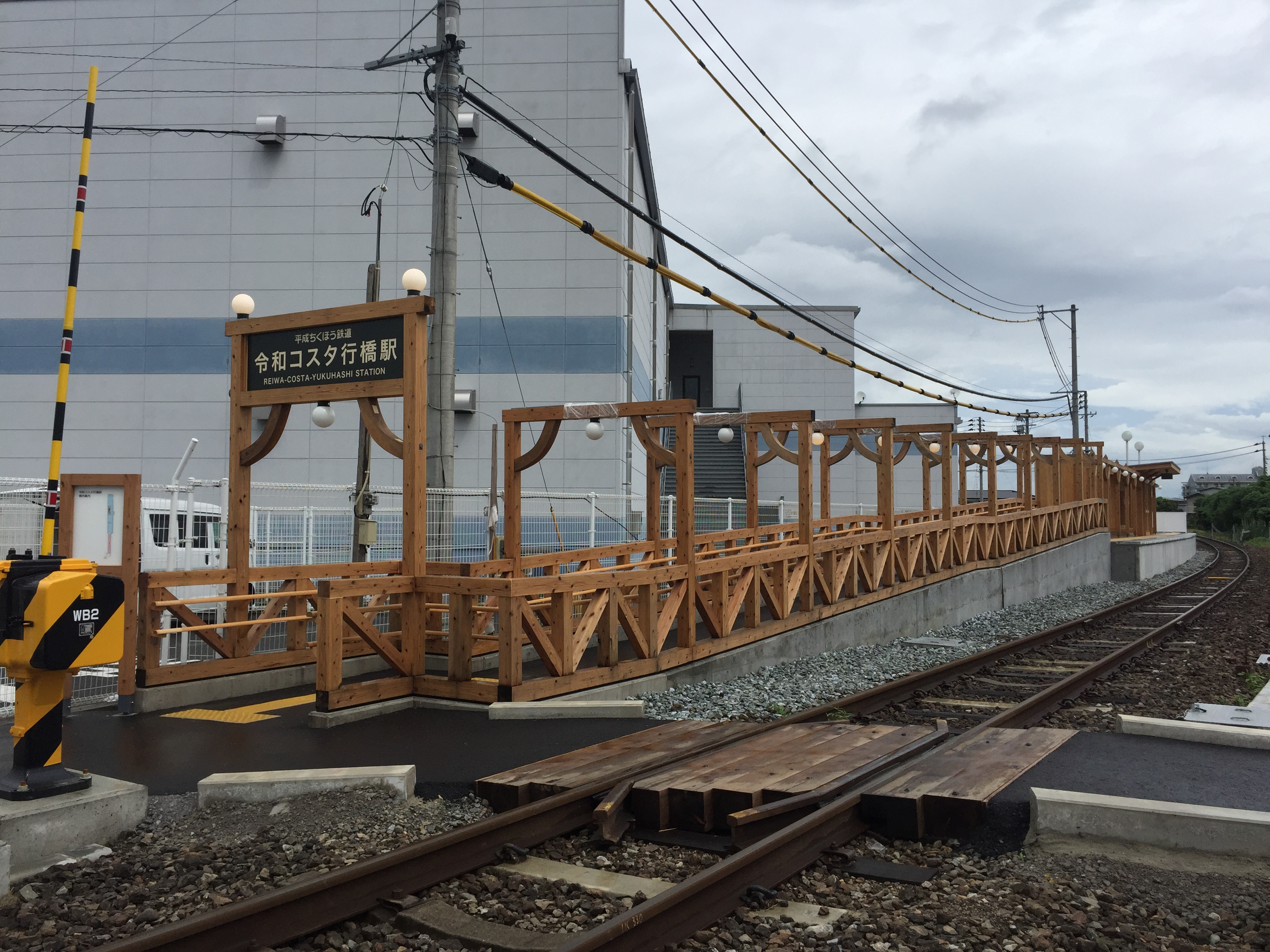
- Station entrance

General information
- Location: 6 Chome-2736-4 Nishiizumi, Yukuhashi-shi, Fukuoka-ken; Japan
- Coordinates: 33.7164°N 130.9733°E
- Operator: Heisei Chikuhō Railway
- Line: ■ Tagawa Line
- Distance: 1.3 km (from Yukuhashi Station)
- Platforms: 1 side platform

Construction
- Structure type: At-grade

Other information
- Status: Unstaffed
- Station code: HC30
- Website: Official website

History
- Opened: 24 August 2019

Services
Preceding station	Heisei Chikuhō Railway	Following station
Yukuhashi Terminus	Tagawa Line	Miyakoizumi towards Tagawa-Ita
Location
- Location within Fukuoka Prefecture Location within Japan

Reiwa Costa Yukuhashi Station (令和コスタ行橋駅, Reiwa-Cosuta-Yukuhashi-eki) is a passenger railway station located in the city of Yukuhashi, Fukuoka Prefecture, Japan. It is operated by the third-sector railway operator Heisei Chikuhō Railway. A local supermarket chain, Costa Yukuhashi, acquired naming rights to the station.

== Lines ==
Reiwa Costa Yukuhasha Station is served by the Tagawa and is located 1.3 km from the starting point of the line at Yukuhashi. Trains arrive roughly every 30 minutes.

== Layout ==
The station consists of one side platform serving a single bi-directional track. There is no station building, but only a shelter on the platform. The station is unattended. The station is primarily made of locally acquired wood. The station building is built of hinoki cypress from the Keichiku area, while the floor and walls are built of Japanese cedar from the Chikuhō area. The station cost 96 million yen to complete.

== History ==
The station was opened on 24 August 2019. A station at this site was slated to open in 2018, but the 2018 Japan floods delayed construction until 2019. Due to the station being opened near the transition into the Reiwa era, the station appended "Reiwa" to the station name. Reiwa Costa Yukuhashi Station is also the first station opened during the Reiwa era.

== Surrounding area ==
- Fukuoka Prefectural Yukuhashi High School
- Fukuoka Prefectural Miyako High School
- Yukuhashi City Izumi Elementary School

== See also ==
- List of railway stations in Japan
