= Kamiita Station =

Railway station in Tagawa, Fukuoka Prefecture, Japan

Kamiita Station 上伊田駅
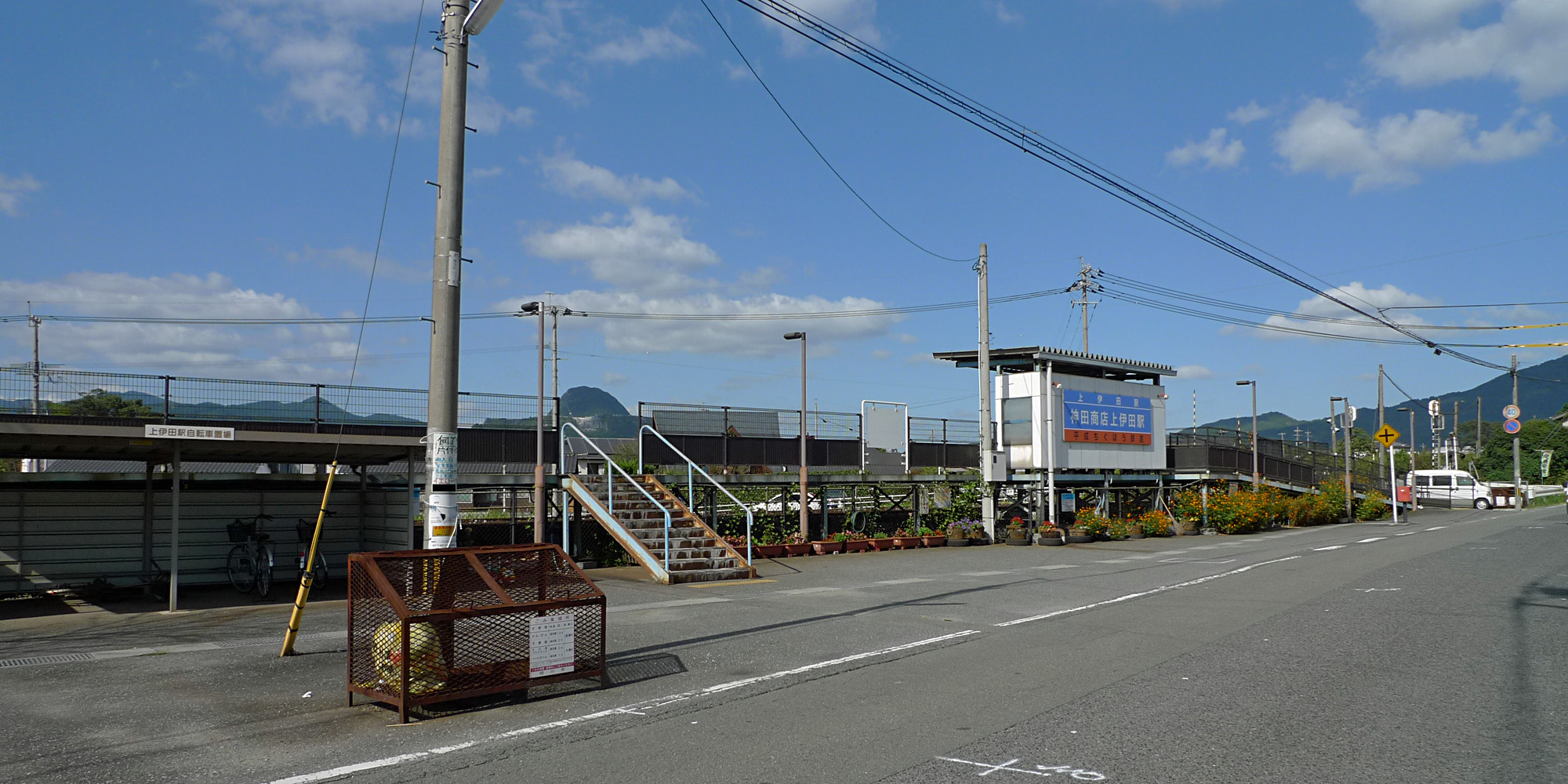
- Station entrance

General information
- Location: Tagawa, Fukuoka; Japan
- Coordinates: 33.6480°N 130.8300°E
- Operator: Heisei Chikuhō Railway
- Line: ■ Tagawa Line
- Distance: 24.9 km (from Yukuhashi Station)
- Platforms: 1 side platform

Construction
- Structure type: At-grade

Other information
- Status: Unstaffed

History
- Opened: 3 March 2001

Services
Preceding station	Heisei Chikuhō Railway	Following station
Magarikane towards Yukuhashi	Tagawa Line	Tagawa-Ita Terminus
Location

Kamiita Station (上伊田駅, Kamiita-eki) is a railway station in Tagawa, Fukuoka Prefecture, Japan. It is on the Tagawa Line, operated by the Heisei Chikuhō Railway. Trains arrive roughly every 30 minutes. East of the station, the JR Kyushu-operated Hitahikosan Line branches off to the north. However, JR Kyushu does not serve this station.

On 1 April 2009, a local recycling plant, Kanda Shōten, acquired naming rights to the station. Therefore, the station is alternatively known as Kanda Shōten Kamiita Station (神田商店上伊田駅, Kanda-Shōten-Hoshii-eki).
