= Uchida Station =

Railway station in Aka, Fukuoka Prefecture, Japan

Uchida Station 内田駅
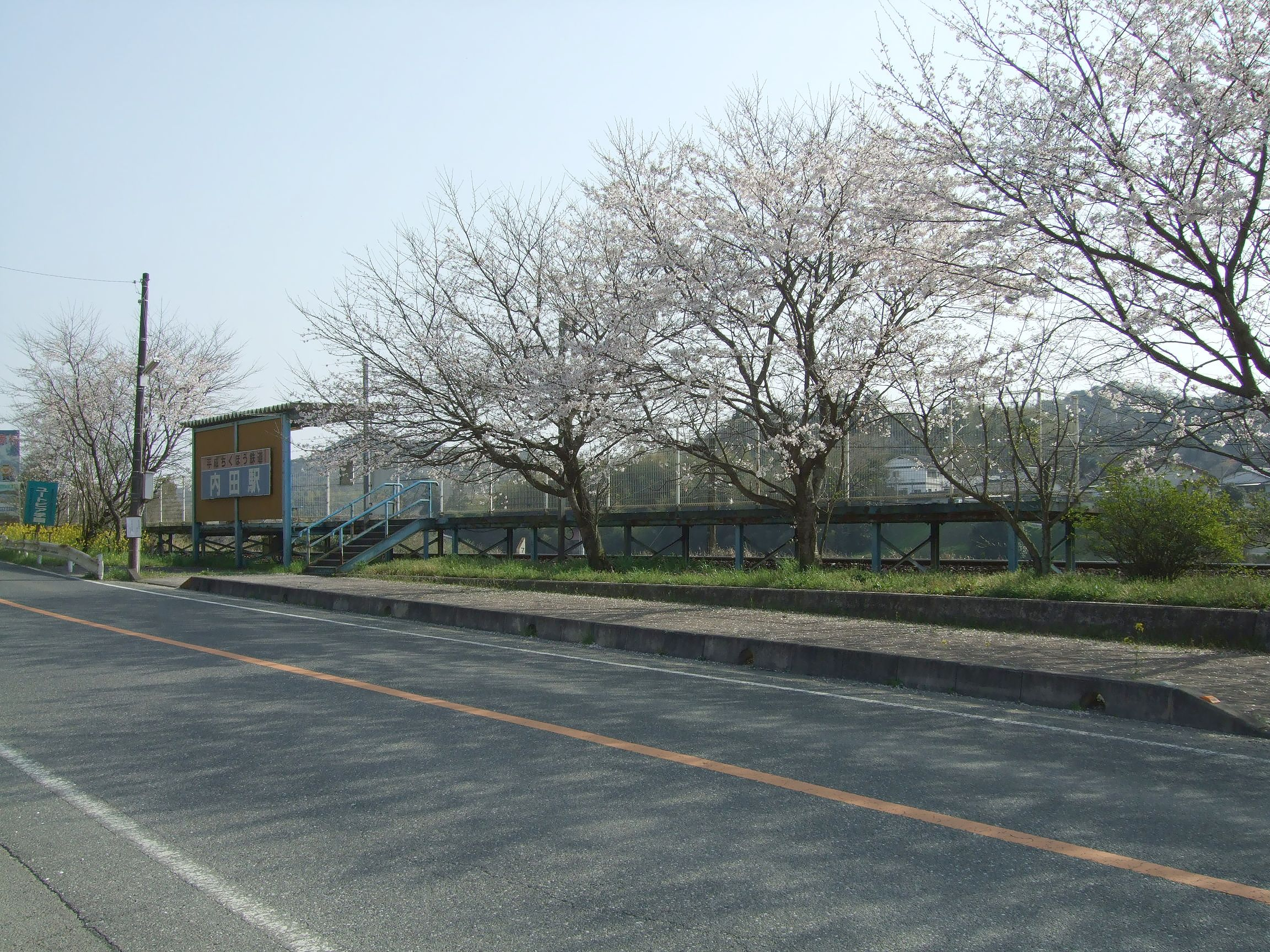
- Station entrance

General information
- Location: 2417-2 Uchida, Aka-mura, Tagawa-gun, Fukuoka-ken 824-0432; Japan
- Coordinates: 33.6378°N 130.8643°E
- Operator: Heisei Chikuhō Railway
- Line: ■ Tagawa Line
- Distance: 20.7 km (from Yukuhashi Station)
- Platforms: 1 side platform

Construction
- Structure type: At-grade

Other information
- Status: Unstaffed
- Station code: HC19
- Website: Official website

History
- Opened: 1 April 1990

Services
Preceding station	Heisei Chikuhō Railway	Following station
Aka towards Yukuhashi	Tagawa Line	Kakishita-Onsen-Guchi towards Tagawa-Ita
Location
- Location within Fukuoka Prefecture Location within Japan

Uchida Station (内田駅, Uchida-eki) is a passenger railway station located in the village of Aka, Fukuoka Prefecture, Japan. It is operated by the third-sector railway operator Heisei Chikuhō Railway.

== Lines ==
Uchida Station is served by the Tagawa and is located 20.7 km from the starting point of the line at Yukuhashi. Trains arrive roughly every 30 minutes.

== Layout ==
The station consists of one side platforms serving a single bi-directional track. There is no station building, but only a shelter on the platform. The station is unattended.

== History ==
Uchida Station opened on 1 April 1990.

== Surrounding area ==
- Fukuoka Prefectural Route 418 Hikoyama Kaharu Line
- Uchida Sanrenkyo Bridge - Registered Tangible Cultural Property

== See also ==
- List of railway stations in Japan
