= Shindembaru Station =

Railway station in Yukuhashi, Fukuoka Prefecture, Japan

Shindembaru Station 新田原駅
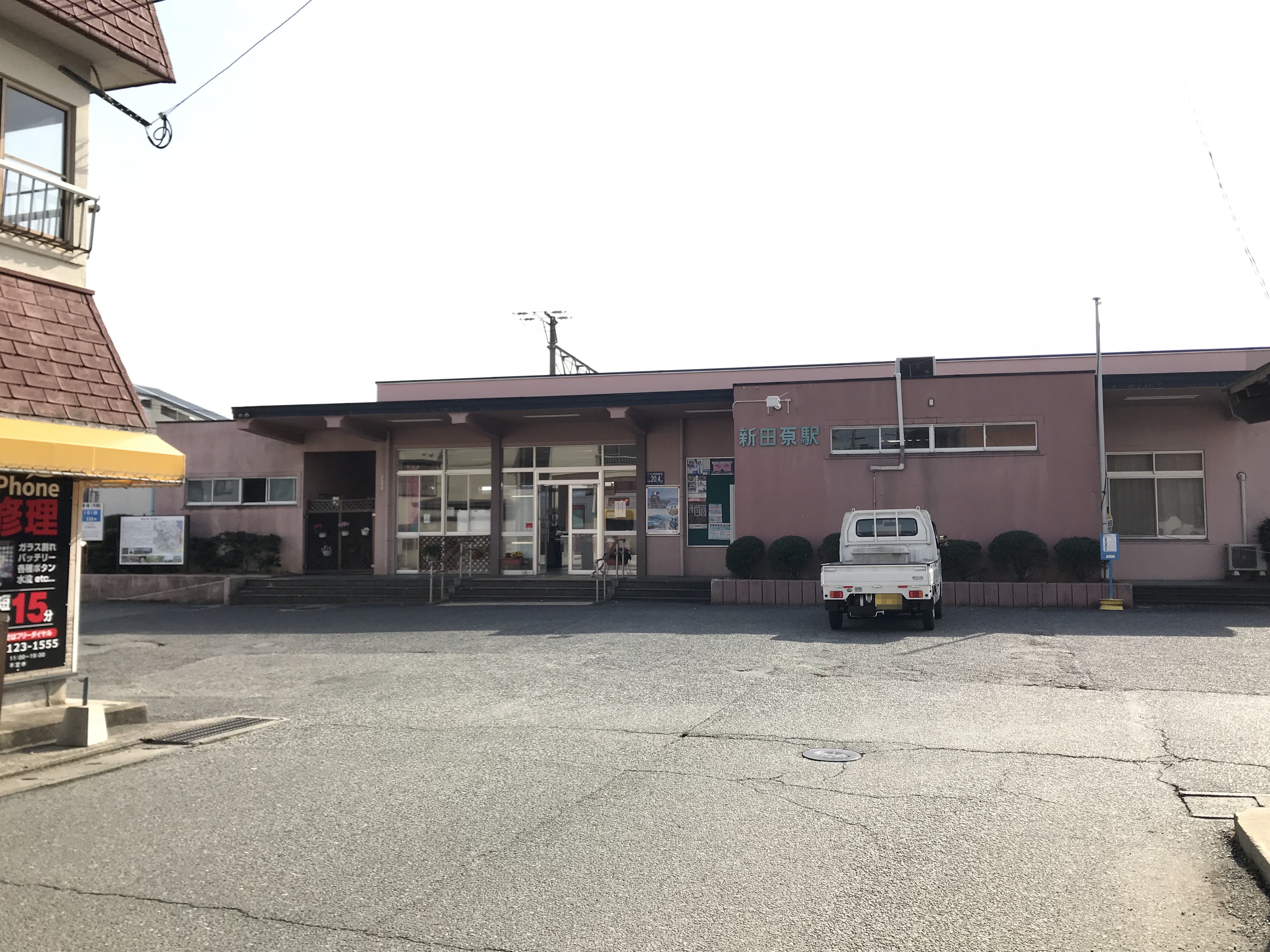
- Shindembaru Station in April 2018

General information
- Location: 1585 Dojoji, Yukuhashi-shi, Fukuoka-ken 824-0026; Japan
- Coordinates: 33°41′44″N 131°00′29″E
- Operator: JR Kyushu
- Line: ■ Nippō Main Line
- Distance: 30.2 km from Kokura
- Platforms: 1 side + 1 island platform
- Tracks: 3

Other information
- Status: Unstaffed
- Website: Official website

History
- Opened: 25 September 1897

Passengers
- FY2020: 675 daily

Services
Preceding station	JR Kyushu	Following station
Tsuiki towards Kagoshima	Nippō Main Line	Minami-Yukuhashi towards Kokura
Location
- Location within Fukuoka Prefecture Location within Japan

Shindembaru Station (新田原駅, Shindenbaru-eki) is a passenger railway station located in the city of Yukuhashi, Fukuoka Prefecture, Japan. It is operated by JR Kyushu.

== Lines ==
Shindembaru Station is served by the Nippō Main Line and is located 30.2 km from the starting point of the line at Kokura.

== Layout ==
The station consists of one side platform and one island platform serving three tracks connected to the station building by a footbridge. The station is unattended.

=== Platforms ===
1	■ ■ Nippō Main Line	for Nakatsu and Usa
2, 3	■ ■ Nippō Main Line	for Yukuhashi and Kokura

== History ==
The station was opened on September 25, 1897 with the opening of the private Hōshū Railway between Yukuhashi and Yanagigaura. The Hōshū railway was acquired by the Kyushu Railway on September 3, 1903. The Kyushu Railway was nationalised on 1 July 1907. Japanese Government Railways (JGR), designated the track as the Hōshū Main Line on 12 October 1909 and expanded it southwards in phases. On 15 December 1923, the Hōshū Main Line was renamed the Nippō Main Line. With the privatization of Japanese National Railways (JNR), the successor of JGR, on 1 April 1987, the station came under the control of JR Kyushu.

== Passenger statistics ==
In fiscal 2020, there was a daily average of 675 boarding passengers at this station.

== Surrounding area ==
- Yukuhashi City Nakatsu Elementary School
- Yukuhashi City Nakatsu Junior High School
- Japan National Route 10

== See also ==
- List of railway stations in Japan
