= Miyakoizumi Station =

Railway station in Yukuhashi, Fukuoka Prefecture, Japan

Miyakoizumi Station 美夜古泉駅
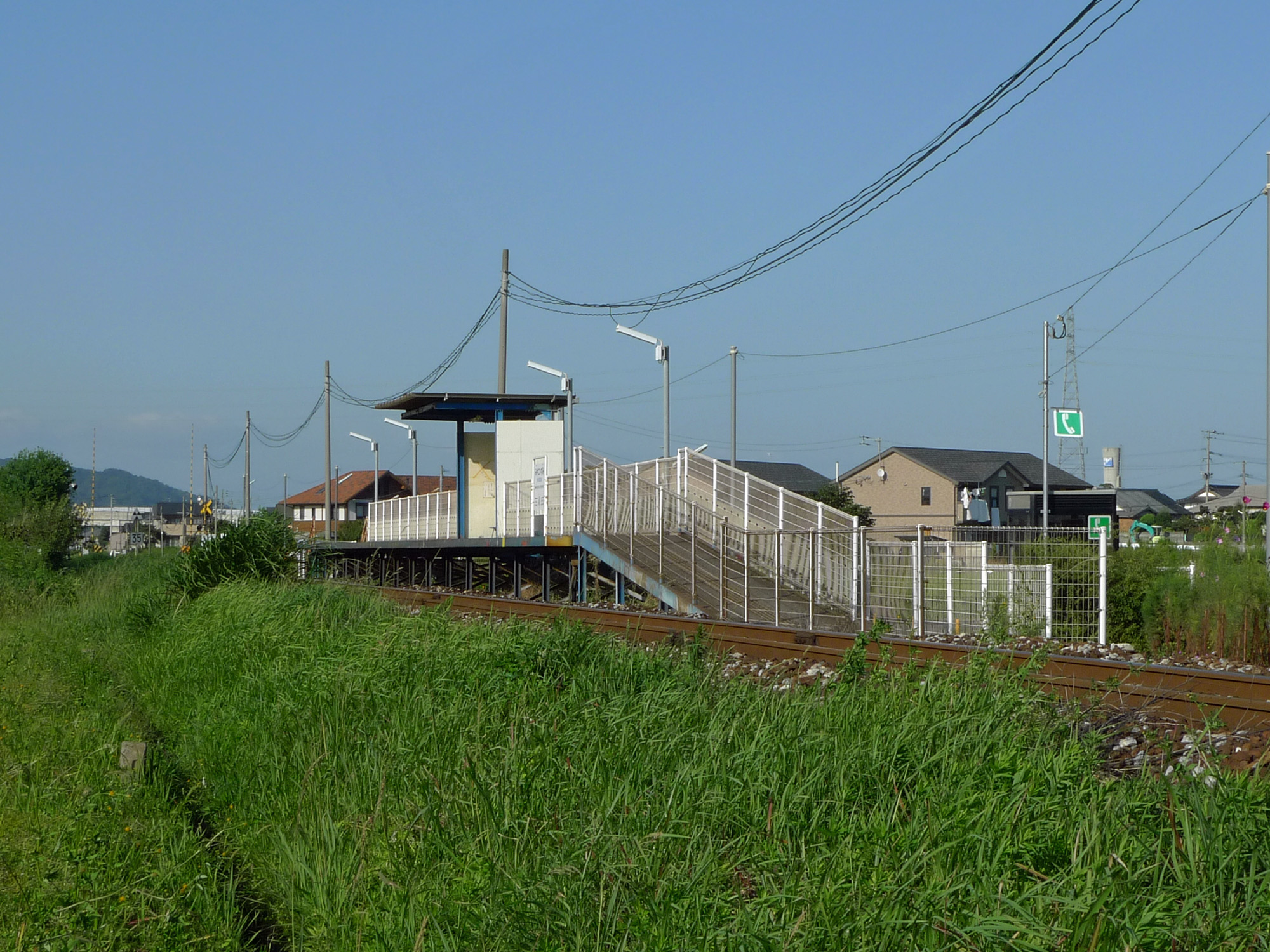
- Miyakoizumi Station

General information
- Location: 7-chōme-16 Nishiizumi, Yukuhashi-shi, Fukuoka-ken 824-0038; Japan
- Coordinates: 33.7090°N 130.9689°E
- Operator: Heisei Chikuhō Railway
- Line: ■ Tagawa Line
- Distance: 2.3 km (from Yukuhashi Station)
- Platforms: 1 side platform

Construction
- Structure type: At-grade

Other information
- Status: Unstaffed
- Station code: HC29

History
- Opened: 1 October 1991

Services
Preceding station	Heisei Chikuhō Railway	Following station
Reiwa Costa Yukuhashi towards Yukuhashi	Tagawa Line	Imagawa-Kappa towards Tagawa-Ita
Location
- Location within Fukuoka Prefecture Location within Japan

Miyakoizumi Station (美夜古泉駅, Miyakoizumi-eki) is a passenger railway station located in the city of Yukuhashi, Fukuoka Prefecture, Japan. It is operated by the third-sector railway operator Heisei Chikuhō Railway. On 1 April 2009, a nearby industrial valve manufacturer, Okano Valve Mfg. (岡野バルブ製造), acquired naming rights to the station. Therefore, the station is alternatively known as Okano Valve-mae Miyakoizumi Station (岡野バルブ前美夜古泉駅, Okano-Barubu-Mae-Miyakoizumi-eki).

== Lines ==
Miyakoizumi Station is served by the Tagawa and is located 2.3 km from the starting point of the line at Yukuhashi.Trains arrive roughly every 30 minutes.

== Layout ==
The station consists of one side platform serving a single bi-directional track. There is no station building, but only a shelter on the platform. The station is unattended.

== History ==
The station was opened on 1 October 1991.

== Surrounding area ==
- Yukuhashi City Izumi Junior High School

== See also ==
- List of railway stations in Japan
