= Saigawa Station =

Railway station in Miyako, Fukuoka Prefecture, Japan

Saigawa Station 犀川駅
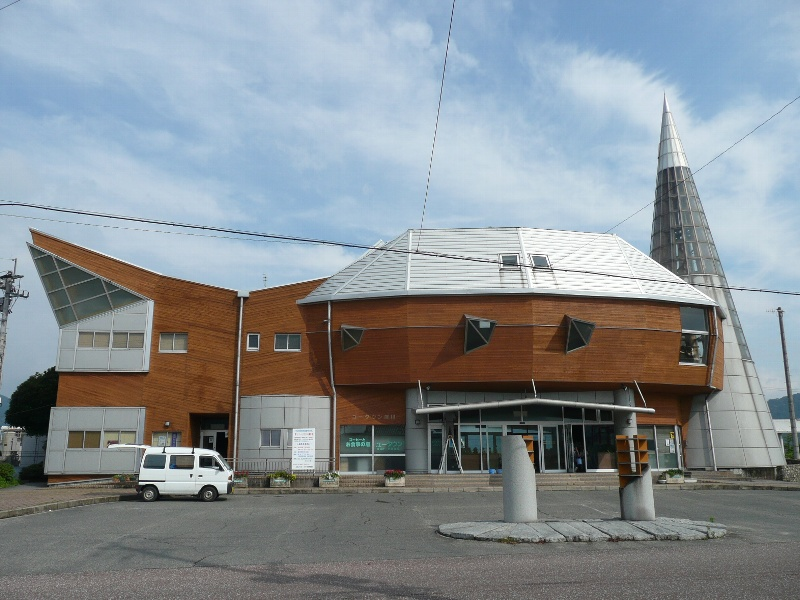
- Station entrance

General information
- Location: 323-2 Saigawahonjo, Miyako-cho, Miyako-gun, Fukuoka-ken 824-0231; Japan
- Coordinates: 33.6507°N 130.9394°E
- Operator: Heisei Chikuhō Railway
- Line: ■ Tagawa Line
- Distance: 9.7 km (from Yukuhashi Station)
- Platforms: 2 side platforms

Construction
- Structure type: At-grade

Other information
- Station code: HC24
- Website: Official website

History
- Opened: 20 April 1897

Services
Preceding station	Heisei Chikuhō Railway	Following station
Higashi-Saigawa-Sanshirō towards Yukuhashi	Tagawa Line	Sakiyama towards Tagawa-Ita
Location
- Location within Fukuoka Prefecture Location within Japan

Saigawa Station (犀川駅, Saigawa-eki) is a passenger railway station located in the town of Miyako, Fukuoka Prefecture, Japan. It is operated by the third-sector railway operator Heisei Chikuhō Railway.

== Lines ==
Saigawa Station is served by the Tagawa and is located 9.7 km from the starting point of the line at Yukuhashi.Trains arrive roughly every 30 minutes.

== Layout ==
The station consists of two opposed side platforms connected by a level crossing. The station is unattended.

== Platforms ==
1	■ ■ Tagawa Line	for Tagawa-Ita, Nōgata
2	■ ■ Tagawa Line	for Toyotsu, Yukuhashi

== History ==
The station was opened on 20 April 1897 as a station on the private Hōshū Railway. The Hōshū railway was acquired by the Kyushu Railway on 3 September 1901. The Kyushu Railway was nationalised on 1 July 1907. Japanese Government Railways (JGR), designated the track as the Hōshū Main Line on 12 October 1909 and expanded it southwards in phases. With the privatization of Japanese National Railways (JNR), the successor of JGR, on 1 April 1987, the station came under the control of JR Kyushu. It was transferred to the control of the Heisei Chikuhō Railway on 1 October 1989.

== Surrounding area ==
- Miyako Town Hall Saigawa Branch
- Miyako Town Saigawa Junior High School
- Miyako Town Saigawa Elementary School

== See also ==
- List of railway stations in Japan
