= Tagawa Line =

Railway line in Fukuoka Prefecture, Japan

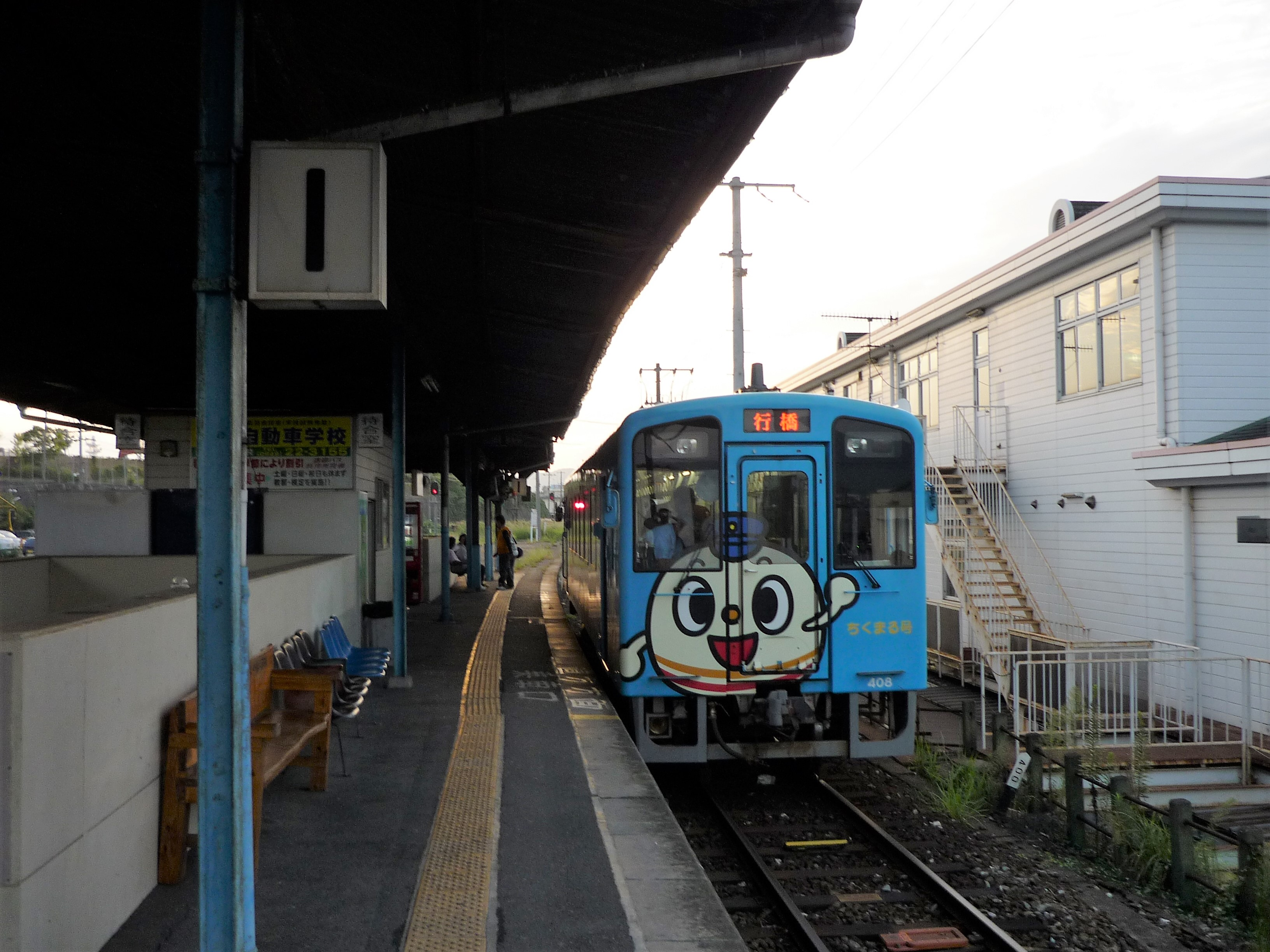
- A Heisei Chikuhō train at Tagawa-Ita Station

Overview
- Native name: 田川線
- Owner: Heisei Chikuhō Railway
- Locale: Fukuoka Prefecture
- Termini: Yukuhashi; Tagawa-Ita
- Stations: 17
- Website: www.heichiku.net

Service
- Type: Heavy rail

History
- Completed: 15 August 1895; 130 years ago
- Privatized: 1 October 1989

Technical
- Line length: 26.3 km (16.3 mi)
- Track gauge: 1,067 mm (3 ft 6 in)
- Electrification: None
- Operating speed: 85 km/h (53 mph)
Route map

The Tagawa Line (田川線, Tagawa-sen) is a 26.3 km railway line owned by the Heisei Chikuhō Railway. The line runs west along the Ima River from Yukuhashi to Tagawa, all within Fukuoka Prefecture.

== History ==
The line was first built in 1895 by the Hōshū Railway (豊州鉄道), which was merged in 1901 with Kyushu Railway. It was an important railway line to transport coal between the Chikuhō coal mine with Kanda Port (苅田港) in Kanda, north of Yukuhashi. Kyushu Railway was nationalized in 1907 and was merged into Japanese Government Railway, where it was named the Tagawa Line. In 1942, the line was extended south from Ita Station (now Tagawa-Ita Station) to Hikosan Station. The portion between Hikosan and Soeda Station was later reorganized into the Hita Line (now Hitahikosan Line) in 1956, and the section between Soeda and Ita was also merged into the same line in 1960 to form the current Tagawa Line.

Between 1899 and 1973, a short freight-only branch line ran north from Kawara Station (now Magarikane Station) to Natsuyoshi.

Ridership suffered with the decline and closure of the Chikuhō coal mine. Therefore, JR Kyushu, the successor of Japanese Government Railway, privatized and transferred the Ita Line, Itoda Line, and Tagawa Line to the newly founded Heisei Chikuhō Railway in 1997.

== Operations ==
The line is not electrified and is single-tracked for the entire line. Some services continue past Tagawa-Ita Station on the Ita Line to Nōgata Station.

The Tagawa Line runs through many historical sites, including the Second Issaka Tunnel (第二石坂トンネル), the oldest railway tunnel in Japan, and the Uchida Triple-Arch Bridge (内田三連橋梁), an old brick arch bridge. Both sites were registered as national cultural heritage sites in 1999.

== Stations ==
All stations are within Fukuoka Prefecture.

No.	Name		Distance (km)	Connections	Location
HC31	Yukuhashi	行橋	0.0	JR Kyushu: JF Nippō Main Line	Yukuhashi
HC30	Reiwa Costa Yukuhashi	令和コスタ行橋	1.3		Yukuhashi
HC29	Miyakoizumi	美夜古泉	2.3		Yukuhashi
HC28	Imagawa-Kappa	今川河童	3.0		Yukuhashi
HC27	Toyotsu	豊津	4.9		Yukuhashi
HC26	Shin-Toyotsu	新豊津	5.8		Miyako
HC25	Higashi-Saigawa-Sanshirō	東犀川三四郎	8.2		Miyako
HC24	Saigawa	犀川	9.7		Miyako
HC23	Sakiyama	崎山駅	12.4		Miyako
HC22	Genjiinomori	源じいの森	15.8		Aka
HC21	Yusubaru	油須原	16.9		Aka
HC20	Aka	赤	18.4		Aka
HC19	Uchida	内田	20.7		Aka
HC18	Kakishita-Onsen-Guchi	柿下温泉口	22.5		Kawara
HC17	Magarikane	勾金	23.6		Kawara
HC16	Kamiita	上伊田	24.9		Tagawa
HC15	Tagawa-Ita	田川伊田	26.3	■ Ita Line; JR Kyushu: JI Hitahikosan Line	Tagawa
