= Minami-Yukuhashi Station =

Railway station in Yukuhashi, Fukuoka Prefecture, Japan

Minami-Yukuhashi Station 南行橋駅
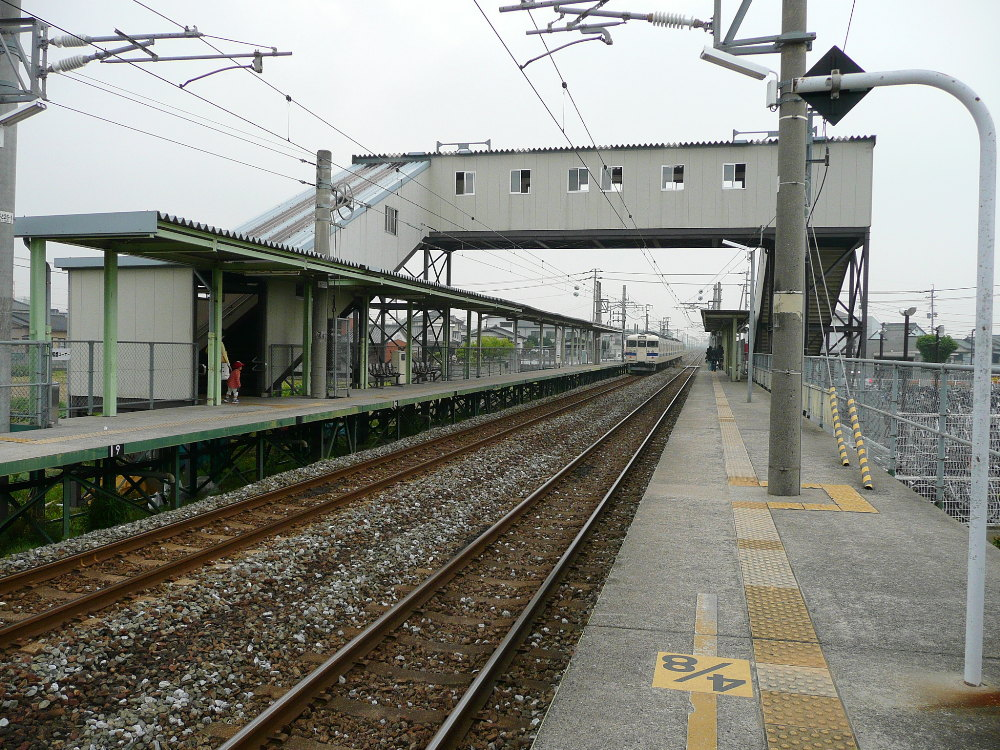
- Minami-Yukuhashi Station in May 2007

General information
- Location: 2-chōme-1 Izumichūō, Yukuhashi-shi, Fukuoka-ken 824-0034; Japan
- Coordinates: 33°42′58″N 130°58′54″E
- Operator: JR Kyushu
- Line: ■ Nippō Main Line
- Distance: 26.8 km from Kokura
- Platforms: 2 side platform
- Tracks: 2

Other information
- Status: Unstaffed
- Website: Official website

History
- Opened: 13 March 1988

Passengers
- FY2020: 1122 daily

Services
Preceding station	JR Kyushu	Following station
Shindembaru towards Kagoshima	Nippō Main Line	Yukuhashi towards Kokura
Location
- Location within Fukuoka Prefecture Location within Japan

Minami-Yukuhashi Station (南行橋駅, Minami-Yukuhashi-eki) is a passenger railway station located in the city of Yukuhashi, Fukuoka Prefecture, Japan. It is operated by JR Kyushu.

== Lines ==
Minami-Yukuhashi Station is served by the Nippō Main Line and is located 26.8 km from the starting point of the line at Kokura.

== Layout ==
The station consists of two opposed side platforms serving two tracks, connected to the station building by a footbridge. The station is unattended.

=== Platforms ===
1	■ ■ Nippō Main Line	for Yukuhashi and Kokura
2	■ ■ Nippō Main Line	for Nakatsu and Usa

== History ==
The station was opened 13 March 1988 as an additional station on the existing track of the Nippō Main Line.

== Passenger statistics ==
In fiscal 2020, there was a daily average of 1122 boarding passengers at this station.

== Surrounding area ==
- Fukuoka Prefectural Yukuhashi High School
- Fukuoka Prefectural Miyako High School

== See also ==
- List of railway stations in Japan
