= Yukuhashi =

Yukuhashi 行橋市
- City
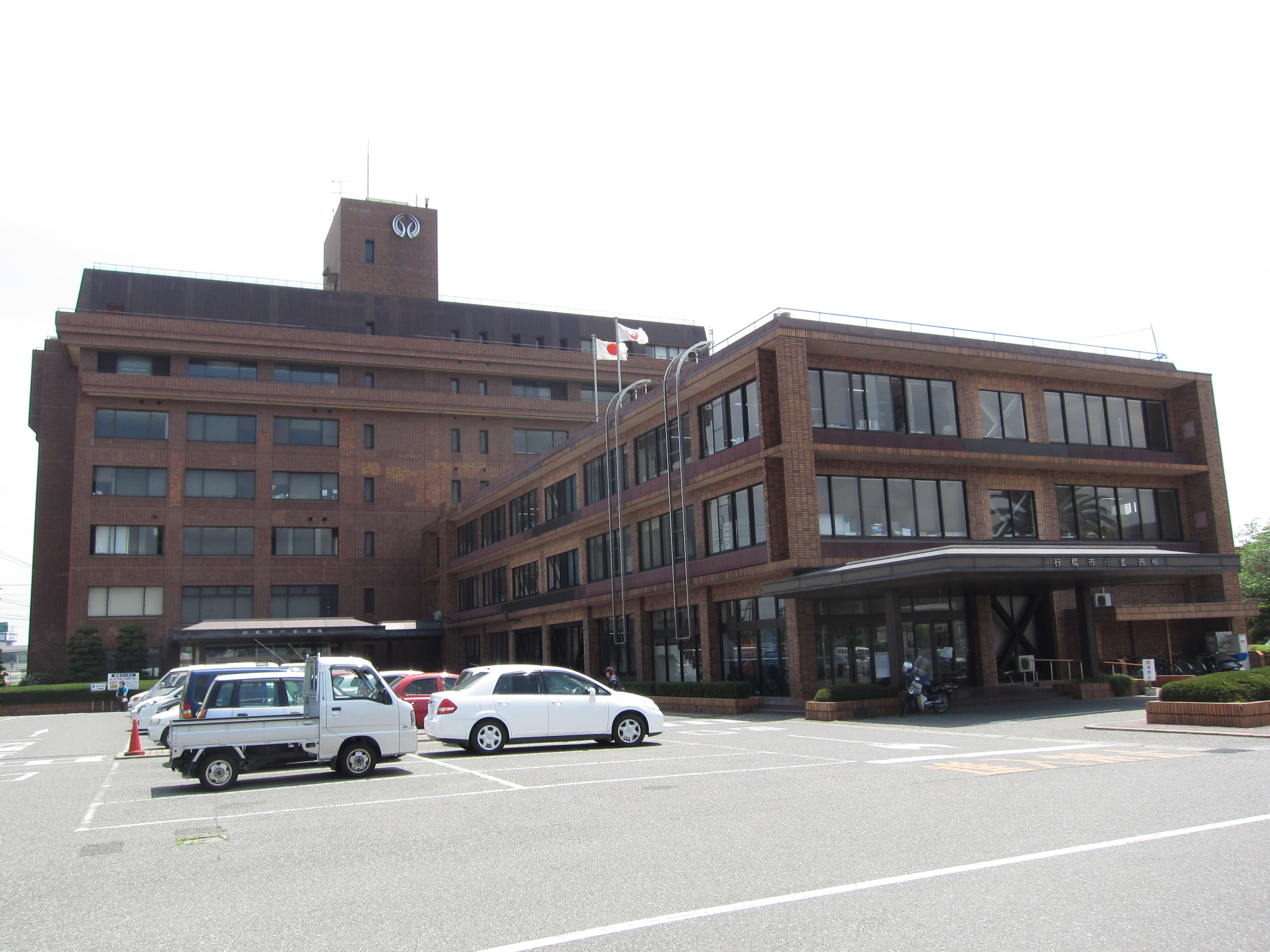
- Yukuhashi City Hall

- Flag Seal
- /0/queryThe property query is required; /0/idsThe property ids is required; /0Failed to match at least one schema; /0/titleThe property title is required; /0/serviceDoes not have a value in the enumeration ["page"]; /0Failed to match exactly one schema; /0/geometriesThe property geometries is required; /0/typeDoes not have a value in the enumeration ["GeometryCollection"]; /0/typeDoes not have a value in the enumeration ["MultiPolygon"]; /0/typeDoes not have a value in the enumeration ["Point"]; /0/typeDoes not have a value in the enumeration ["MultiPoint"]; /0/typeDoes not have a value in the enumeration ["LineString"]; /0/typeDoes not have a value in the enumeration ["MultiLineString"]; /0/typeDoes not have a value in the enumeration ["Polygon"]; /0/coordinatesThe property coordinates is required; /0/geometryThe property geometry is required; /0/typeDoes not have a value in the enumeration ["Feature"]; /0/featuresThe property features is required; /0/typeDoes not have a value in the enumeration ["FeatureCollection"]; Location of Yukuhashi in Fukuoka Prefecture

- Location in Japan
- Coordinates: 33°43′44″N 130°58′59″E
- Country: Japan
- Region: Kyushu
- Prefecture: Fukuoka

Area
  - Total: 70.06 km^{2} (27.05 sq mi)

Population (April 30, 2023)
  - Total: 72,376
  - Density: 1,033/km^{2} (2,676/sq mi)
- Time zone: UTC+09:00 (JST)
- City hall address: 1-1-1 Chuo, Yukuhashi-shi, Fukuoka-ken 824-8601
- Climate: Cfa
- Website: Official website
- Symbols
- Flower: Cosmos (plant)
- Tree: Osmanthus fragrans

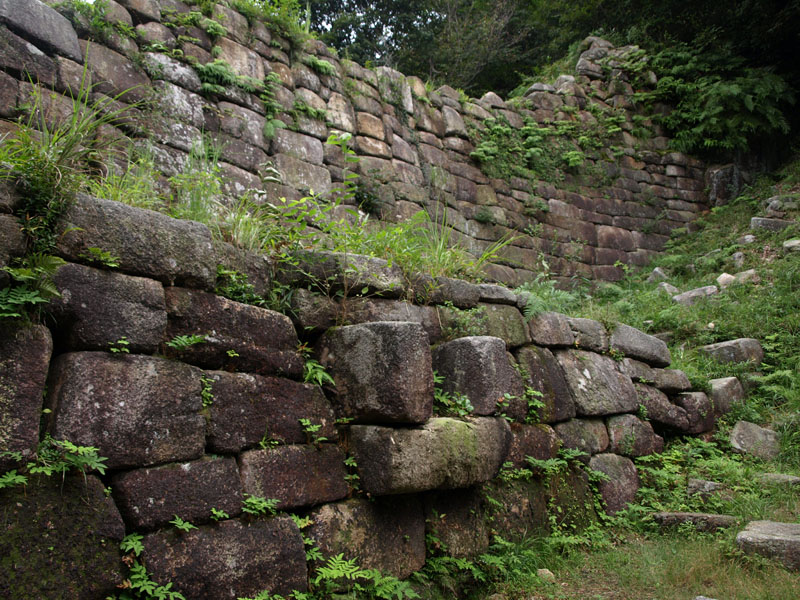
Goshogatani Kogoishi

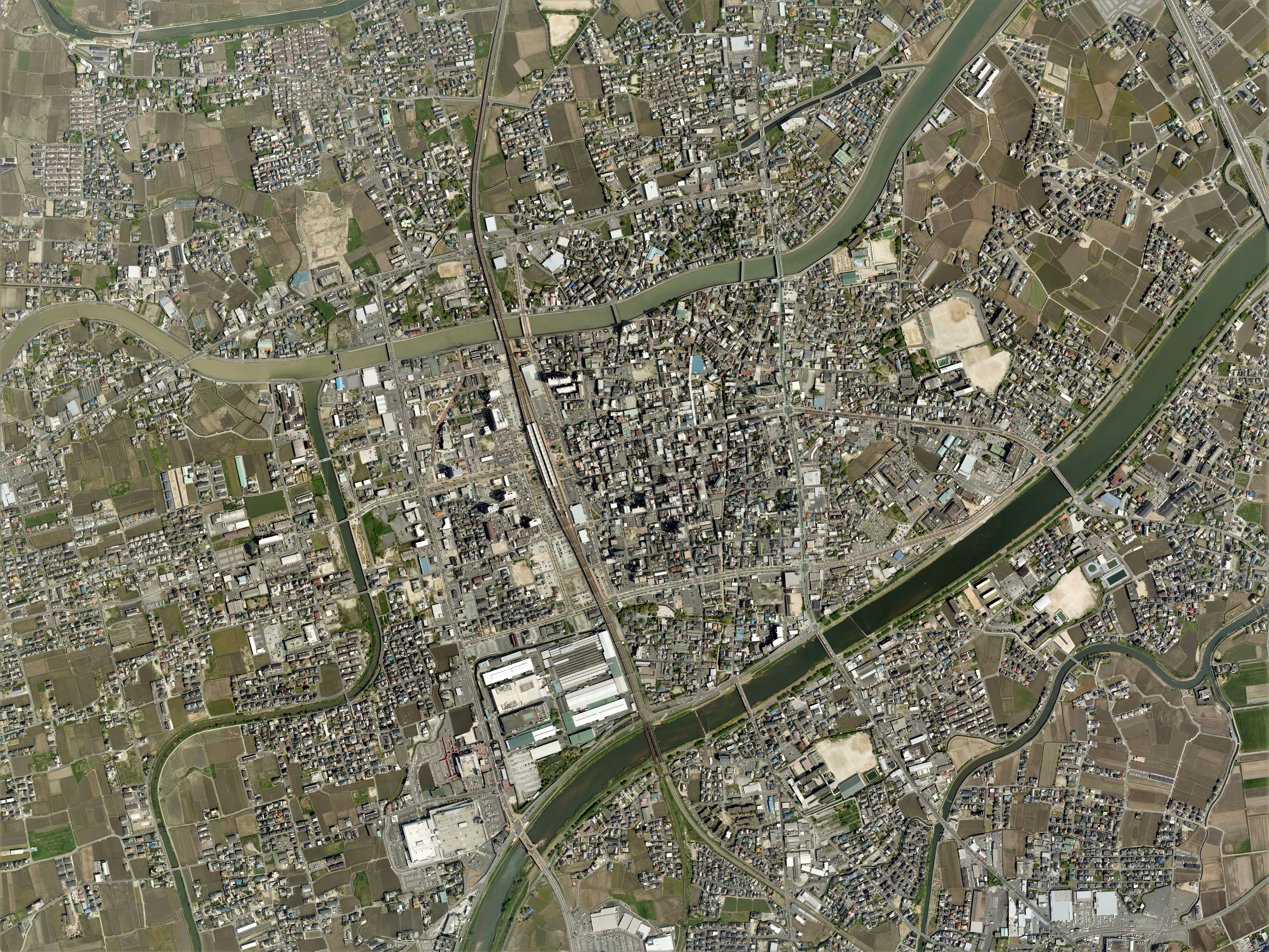
Yukuhashi city center

Yukuhashi (行橋市, Yukuhashi-shi) is a city located in Fukuoka Prefecture, Japan. As of 30 April 2024, its estimated population is 72,376, and its population density is 1000 people per km^{2}. The total area of the city is 70.06 km^{2} (27.05 sq mi).

== Geography ==
Yukuhashi is located in the eastern part of Fukuoka Prefecture, 25 kilometers south-southeast of Kitakyushu, and 25 kilometers northwest of Nakatsu, Ōita. It is bordered by the Gulf of Suo on the Seto Inland Sea to the east. Most of the city area is in the plains, with the only mountainous areas being in the area adjacent to Miyako Town in the southwest and in some areas adjacent to Kitakyushu City in the northeast. It is located at the foot of Hiraodai, famous for its karst plateau. The Imagawa River, which runs through the center of the city, has been maintained as a promenade, and in spring the cherry blossoms planted along the river are a tourist attraction.

=== Neighboring municipalities ===
Fukuoka Prefecture

- Chikujō
- Kanda
- Kitakyushu
- Miyako

=== Climate ===
Yukuhashi has a humid subtropical climate (Köppen: Cfa). The average annual temperature in Yukuhashi is 15.9 °C (60.6 °F). The average annual rainfall is 1,793.1 mm (70.59 in) with July as the wettest month. The temperatures are highest on average in August, at around 27.3 °C (81.1 °F), and lowest in January, at around 5.3 °C (41.5 °F). The highest temperature ever recorded in Yukuhashi was 38.9 °C (102.0 °F) on 2 August 2026; the coldest temperature ever recorded was −8.1 °C (17.4 °F) on 19 February 1977.

Climate data for Yukuhashi (1991−2020 normals, extremes 1977−present)
Month	Jan	Feb	Mar	Apr	May	Jun	Jul	Aug	Sep	Oct	Nov	Dec	Year
Record high °C (°F)	20.1 (68.2)	22.6 (72.7)	26.5 (79.7)	29.8 (85.6)	32.2 (90.0)	35.3 (95.5)	37.6 (99.7)	38.9 (102.0)	35.8 (96.4)	31.4 (88.5)	26.8 (80.2)	25.5 (77.9)	38.9 (102.0)
Mean daily maximum °C (°F)	9.6 (49.3)	10.5 (50.9)	14.0 (57.2)	19.1 (66.4)	23.8 (74.8)	26.5 (79.7)	30.4 (86.7)	31.6 (88.9)	28.0 (82.4)	23.0 (73.4)	17.4 (63.3)	12.0 (53.6)	20.5 (68.9)
Daily mean °C (°F)	5.3 (41.5)	5.9 (42.6)	9.2 (48.6)	13.9 (57.0)	18.8 (65.8)	22.4 (72.3)	26.4 (79.5)	27.3 (81.1)	23.6 (74.5)	18.1 (64.6)	12.4 (54.3)	7.4 (45.3)	15.9 (60.6)
Mean daily minimum °C (°F)	1.3 (34.3)	1.5 (34.7)	4.4 (39.9)	8.9 (48.0)	14.0 (57.2)	18.9 (66.0)	23.1 (73.6)	23.8 (74.8)	19.8 (67.6)	13.6 (56.5)	7.7 (45.9)	3.0 (37.4)	11.7 (53.0)
Record low °C (°F)	−6.1 (21.0)	−8.1 (17.4)	−5.0 (23.0)	−1.8 (28.8)	2.6 (36.7)	7.5 (45.5)	14.7 (58.5)	16.7 (62.1)	7.3 (45.1)	1.9 (35.4)	−1.3 (29.7)	−3.8 (25.2)	−8.1 (17.4)
Average precipitation mm (inches)	74.0 (2.91)	79.2 (3.12)	118.8 (4.68)	141.3 (5.56)	160.1 (6.30)	309.0 (12.17)	343.5 (13.52)	159.6 (6.28)	165.9 (6.53)	94.6 (3.72)	82.3 (3.24)	65.0 (2.56)	1,793.1 (70.59)
Average precipitation days (≥ 1.0 mm)	9.8	9.4	10.9	10.1	9.0	12.5	12.3	9.5	9.7	6.4	8.3	9.1	117
Mean monthly sunshine hours	119.6	130.7	166.2	190.9	207.3	143.1	178.6	208.0	161.4	175.6	144.2	124.5	1,950.2
Source: Japan Meteorological Agency

=== Demographics ===
Per Japanese census data, the population of Yukuhashi in 2020 is 71,426 people. Yukuhashi has been conducting censuses since 1950.

Historical population

Year	Pop.	±%
1950	43,507	—
1955	46,426	+6.7%
1960	47,188	+1.6%
1965	47,495	+0.7%
1970	47,843	+0.7%
1975	53,750	+12.3%
1980	61,838	+15.0%
1985	65,527	+6.0%

Year	Pop.	±%
1990	65,711	+0.3%
1995	67,833	+3.2%
2000	69,737	+2.8%
2005	70,070	+0.5%
2010	70,465	+0.6%
2015	70,586	+0.2%
2020	71,426	+1.2%

Yukuhashi population statistics

== History ==
The area of Yukuhashi was part of ancient Buzen Province. During the Asuka Period, ancient mountain castles known as kōgoishi were constructed in several areas as protection against possible invasion by Silla or Tang China. During the Edo Period the area was partly under the control of Kokura Domain, with smaller areas as tenryō territory under direct control of the Tokugawa Shogunate. After the Meiji restoration, the village of Yukuhashi was established on May 1, 1889 with the creation of the modern municipalities system. On October 10, 1954 Yukuhashi merged with the eight surrounding villages of Minoshima, Imamoto, Nakatsu, Izumi, Tsubakishi, Imagawa, Hieda, and Enei to form the city of Yukuhashi.

== Government ==
Yukuhashi has a mayor-council form of government with a directly elected mayor and a unicameral city council of 20 members. Yukuhashi contributes one member to the Fukuoka Prefectural Assembly. In terms of national politics, the city is part of the Fukuoka 11th district of the lower house of the Diet of Japan.

== Economy ==
Yukuhashi has a mainly rural economy based on agriculture and commercial fishing and is a regional commercial center. Due to its proximity to Kitakyushu and numerous transportation options, it is increasingly becoming a commuter town.

== Education ==
Yukuhashi has eleven public elementary schools and six public junior high schools operated by the city government and two public high schools operated by the Fukuoka Prefectural Board of Education.

== Transportation ==
=== Railways ===
JR Kyushu - Nippō Main Line

- Yukuhashi - Minami-Yukuhashi - Shindenbaru

Heisei Chikuhō Railway - Tagawa Line

- Yukuhashi - Reiwa-Kosuta-Yukuhashi - Miyako-Izumi - Imagawa-Kappa - Toyotsu
  - Coto Coto Train touristic service

=== Highways ===
- Higashikyushu Expressway
- National Route 10
- National Route 201
- National Route 496

== Local attractions ==
- Goshogotani Kōgoishi, National Historic Site

== Noted people from Yukuhashi ==
- Suematsu Kenchō, Meiji era politician
