= Yukuhashi Station =

Railway station in Yukuhashi, Fukuoka Prefecture, Japan

JF 10 Yukuhashi Station 行橋駅
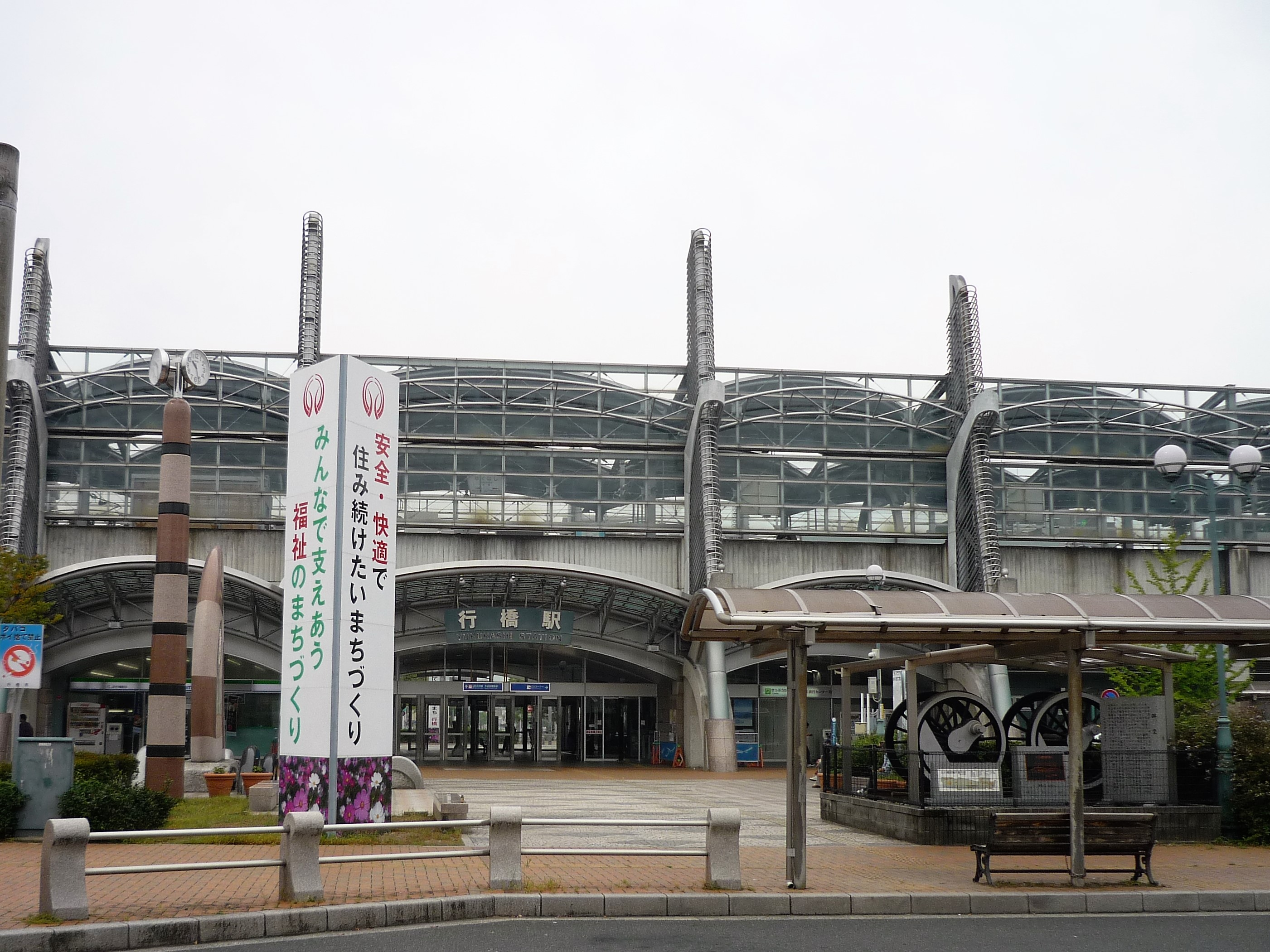
- Yukuhashi Station east entrance in September 2017

General information
- Location: 2-chōme-1 Nishimiyaichi, Yukuhashi-shi, Fukuoka-ken 824-0031; Japan
- Coordinates: 33°43′43″N 130°58′13″E
- Operator: JR Kyushu Heisei Chikuhō Railway
- Line: JF Nippō Main Line ■ Tagawa Line
- Distance: 25.0 km from Kokura
- Platforms: 2 island platforms
- Tracks: 5

Other information
- Status: Staffed (Midori no Madoguchi)
- Station code: JF10, HC31
- Website: Official website

History
- Opened: 15 August 1895

Passengers
- FY2020: 4790 daily (JR); 351(Heisei Chikuhō)

Services
| Preceding station | JR Kyushu | Following station |
|---|---|---|
| Minami-Yukuhashi towards Kagoshima | Nippō Main Line | Obase-Nishikōdai-mae towards Kokura |
| Preceding station | Heisei Chikuhō Railway | Following station |
| Terminus | Tagawa Line | Reiwa Costa Yukuhashi towards Tagawa-Ita |
Location
- Location within Fukuoka Prefecture Location within Japan

Yukuhashi Station (行橋駅, Yukuhashi-eki) is a passenger railway station located in the city of Yukuhashi, Fukuoka Prefecture, Japan. It is operated by JR Kyushu and the third-sector railway operator Heisei Chikuhō Railway..

== Lines ==
Yukuhashi Station is served by the Nippō Main Line and is located 25.0 km from the starting point of the line at Kokura. It is also the terminus of the Tagawa line and is 26.3 kilometers from the opposing terminus at Tagawa-Ita Station

== Layout ==
The station consists of two island platforms with four tracks, and a cut-out platform for the Heisei Chikuhō Railway Line (platform 5) located at the southern end of the Nippō Main Line inbound platform (platforms 3 and 4). The stairs leading to the Heisei Chikuhō Railway platform and the ground level area are located outside the JR ticket gate, and can be freely accessed (there is no elevator). Tickets are purchased from automatic ticket vending machines located on the ground floor, but cash can also be paid on board. There is a transfer gate at the border between the Heisei Chikuhō Railway platform and the Nippō Main Line inbound platform, and a JR automatic ticket vending machine is installed. The Honya exit is directly managed by JR Kyushu and has a Midori no Madoguchi staffed ticket office. The Heisei Chikuhō Railway transfer gate is outsourced to JR Kyushu Service Support.

=== Platforms ===
| 1,2 | ■ JF Nippō Main Line | for Nakatsu and Usa |
| 3,4 | ■ JF Nippō Main Line | for Kokura |
| 5 | ■ ■ Heisei Chikuhō Railway Tagawa Line | for Tagawa-Ita |

== History ==
The station was opened on 15 August 1895 with the opening of the private Hōshū Railway from Kokura. The line was further extended to Yanagigaura by 25 September 1897. The Hōshū railway was acquired by the Kyushu Railway on 3 September 1903. The Kyushu Railway was nationalised on 1 July 1907. Japanese Government Railways (JGR), designated the track as the Hōshū Main Line on 12 October 1909. The Tagawa Line began operations from 2 October 1909. On 15 December 1923, the Hōshū Main Line was renamed the Nippō Main Line. With the privatization of Japanese National Railways (JNR), the successor of JGR, on 1 April 1987, the station came under the control of JR Kyushu.

== Passenger statistics ==
In fiscal 2021, the station was used by an average of 4,790 passengers daily (boarding passengers only), and it ranked 32nd among the busiest stations of JR Kyushu. In the same period, the Heisei Chikuhō Railway portion of the station was used by 351 passengers daily.

== Surrounding area ==
The station is located in the urban center of Yukuhashi

- Yukuhashi City Hall

== See also ==
- List of railway stations in Japan
