= Heisei Chikuhō Railway =

Rail operator based in Fukuoka Prefecture, Japan

- Ita Line (伊田線), Itoda Line (糸田線), and Tagawa Line (田川線)

Overview
- Headquarters: Fukuchi, Fukuoka
- Locale: Kyushu, Japan
- Dates of operation: 1989–2029 (planned)

Technical
- Track gauge: 1,067 mm
- Length: 49.2 km

Other
- Website: www.heichiku.net

The Heisei Chikuho Railway Co. Ltd. (平成筑豊鉄道株式会社) is a third-sector operator of four railway lines in Fukuoka Prefecture, Japan. The railway's nickname is Heichiku.

The railway is planned to cease operations at the end of fiscal 2028, and will be replaced with bus service.

== Principal investors ==
Fukuoka Prefecture holds 27.5% of the stock in the railway. The cities of Tagawa, Nōgata, and Yukuhashi hold 14.8%, 6.6%, and 6.6% each. RKB news reports the line is losing around a billion yen every year.

== Lines ==
- Ita Line (16.1 km) - The Nogata to Kaneda section opened in 1893, and the Kaneda to Tagawa-Ita section in 1899. The line was double-tracked in 1911, and freight services ceased in 2004.
- Itoda Line (6.8 km) - The Tagawa-Gotoji to Itoda section opened in 1897 to haul coal and the Itoda to Kaneda section opened in 1929 to service a cement plant.
- Tagawa Line (26.3 km) - The entire Tagawa-Ita to Yukuhashi line opened in 1895.
- Mojikō Retro Kankō Line (2.1 km) - The Mojiko to Moji Harbour line opened in 1929, and freight services ceased in 2004. Despite a significant landslide in 2006, the line was reopened as a tourist line in 2009.

The Mojikō Retro Kankō Line is classified as a "specific purpose railway business" (特定目的鉄道事業, tokutei mokuteki tetsudō jigyō) under the Railway Business Act of Japan as it does not purport to transport daily passengers or freight. Heisei Chikuhō Railway operates trains as Category 2 operator (as defined in the Act, see "Rail transport in Japan" for details) on the track owned by the city of Kitakyūshū as Category 3 operator.

== Rolling stock ==
As of 1 April 2016, the railway operates a fleet of 12 single-car 400 series diesel railcars (numbered 401 to 412) and one 500 series diesel railcar (numbered 501).

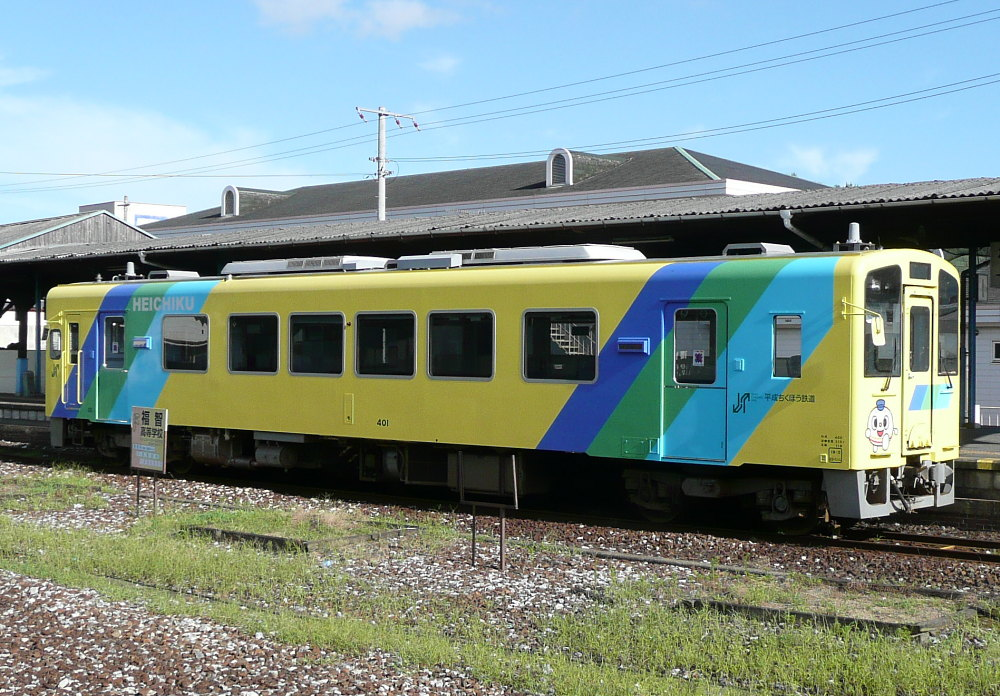
400 series DMU car 401 in August 2007

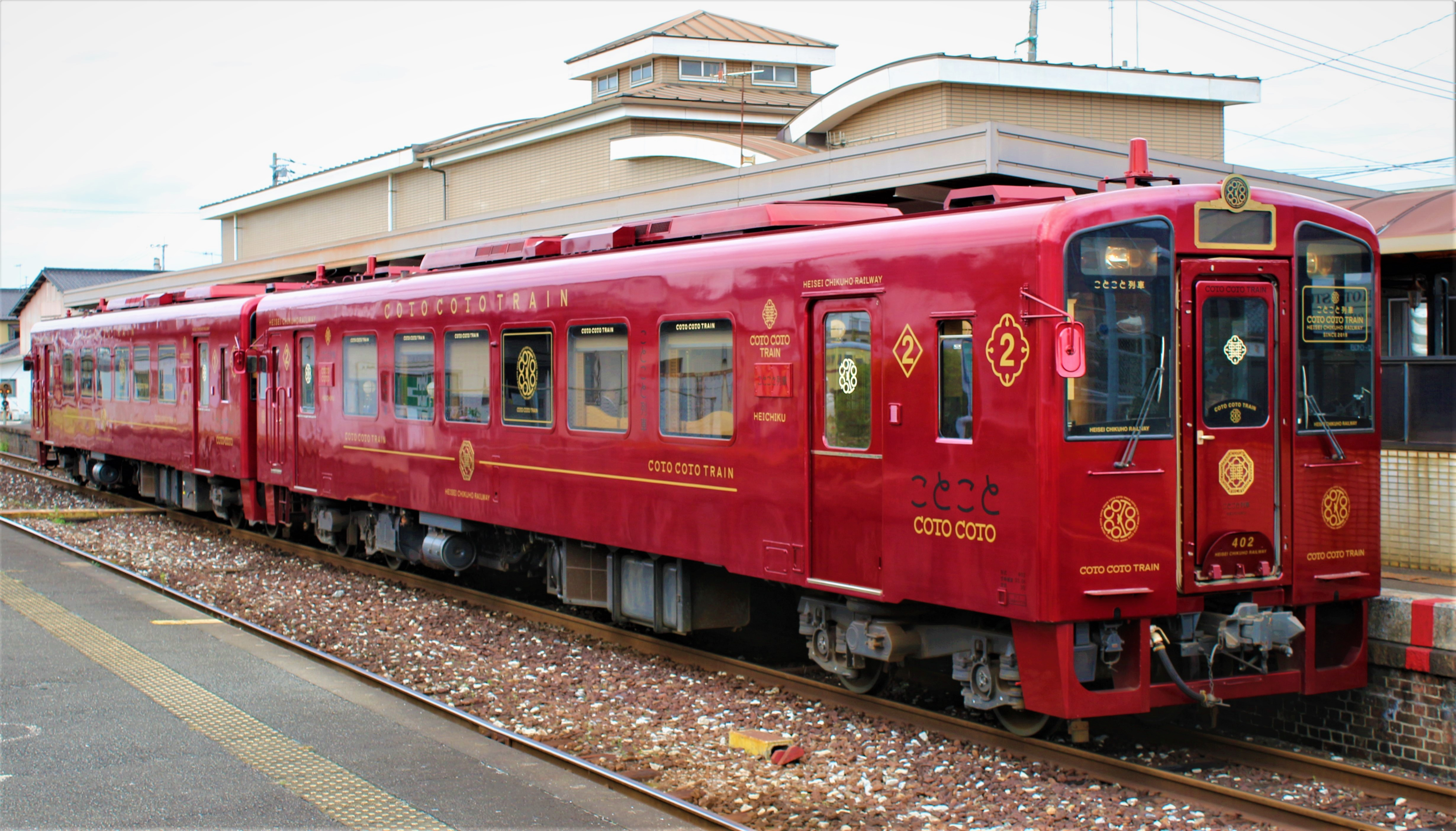
400 type diesel train 401 + 402 "Coto Coto Train"

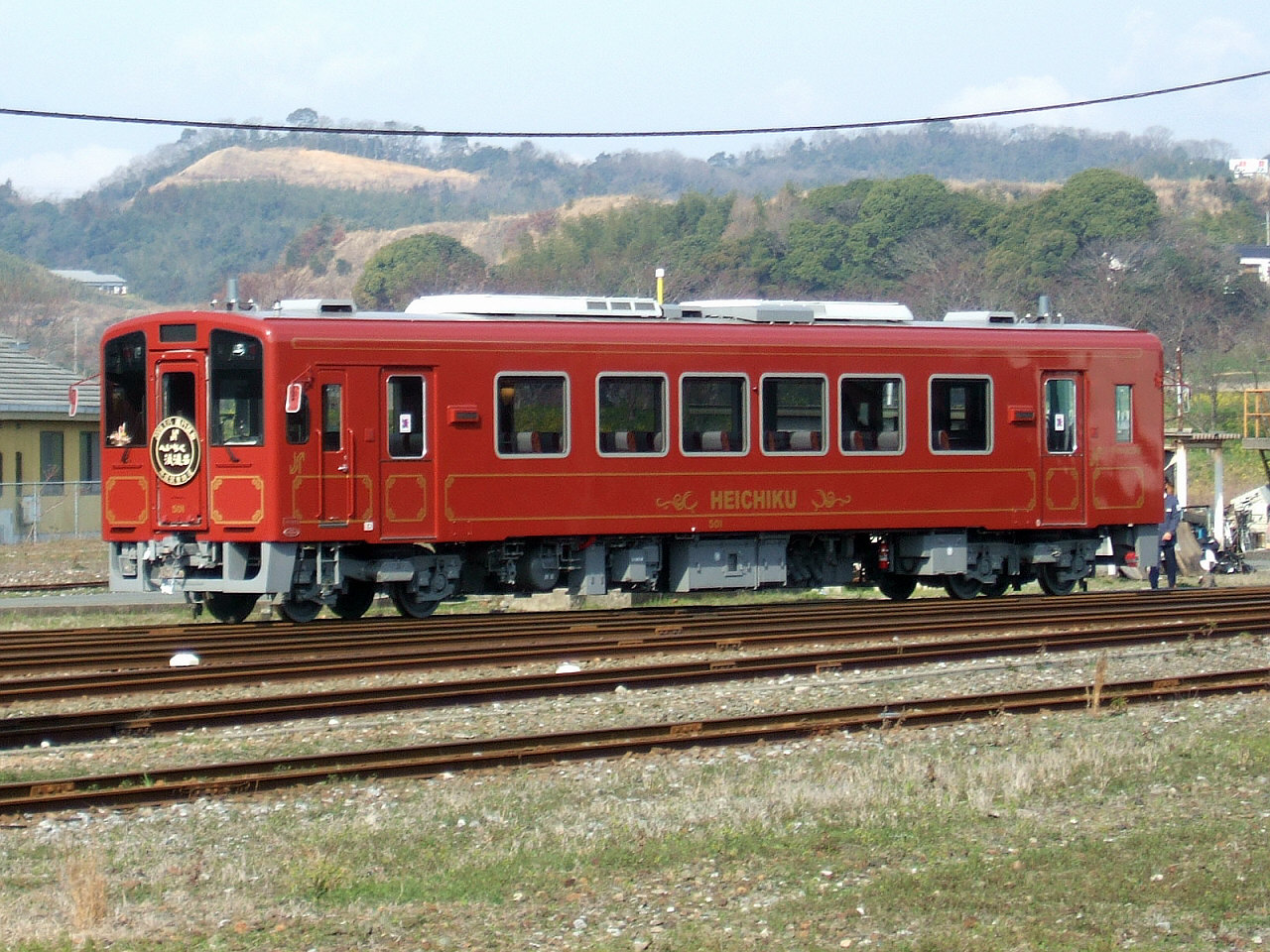
500 series DMU car 501 in March 2008

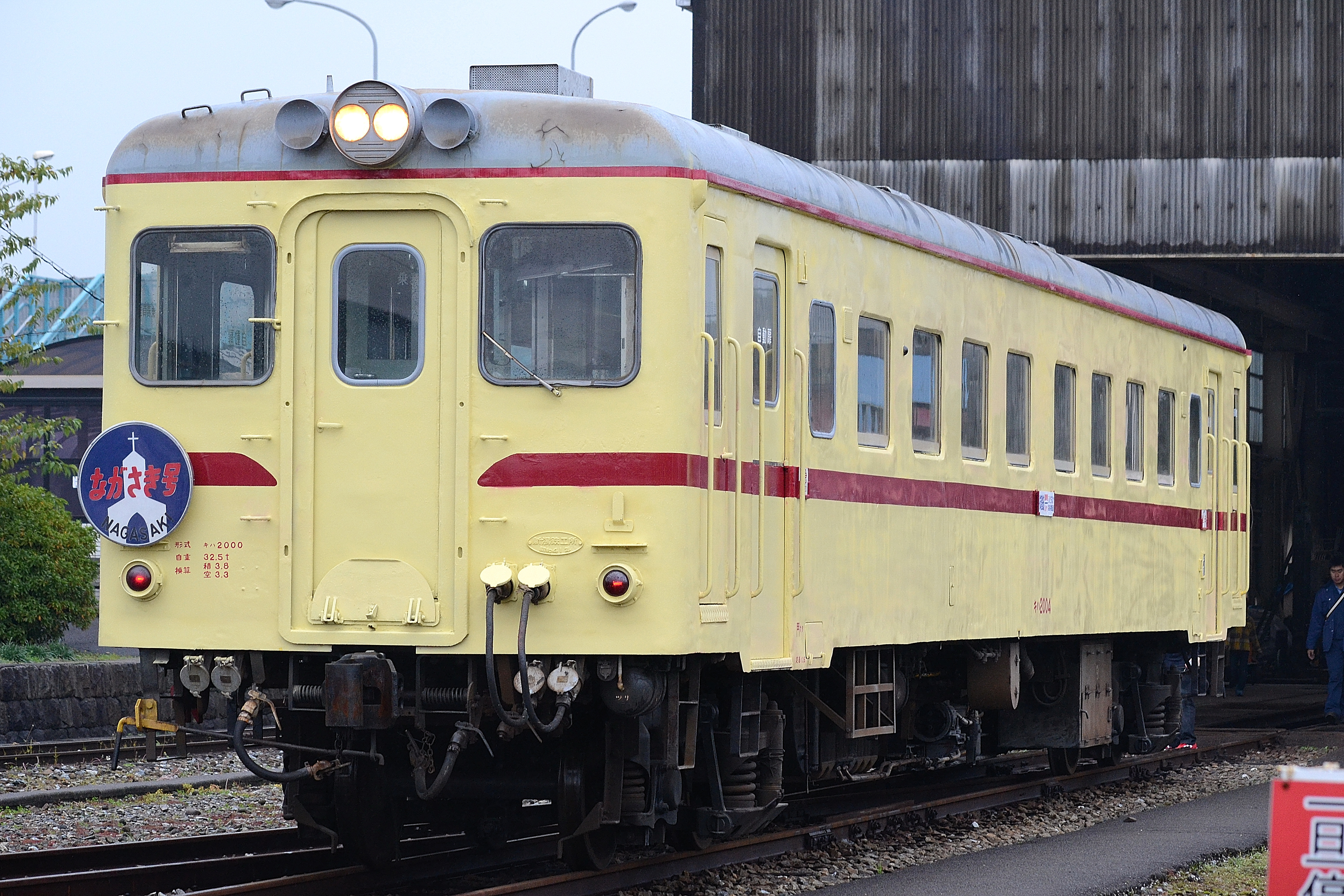
Former Hitachinaka Seaside Railway KiHa 2004 in December 2016

In 2016, the railway purchased former KiHa 2000 series diesel rail car KiHa 2004 from the Hitachinaka Seaside Railway in Ibaraki Prefecture, which was withdrawn from service in December 2015. In 2019, the Coto Coto Train started as a new touristic service in the Fukuoka Prefecture.

=== Former rolling stock ===
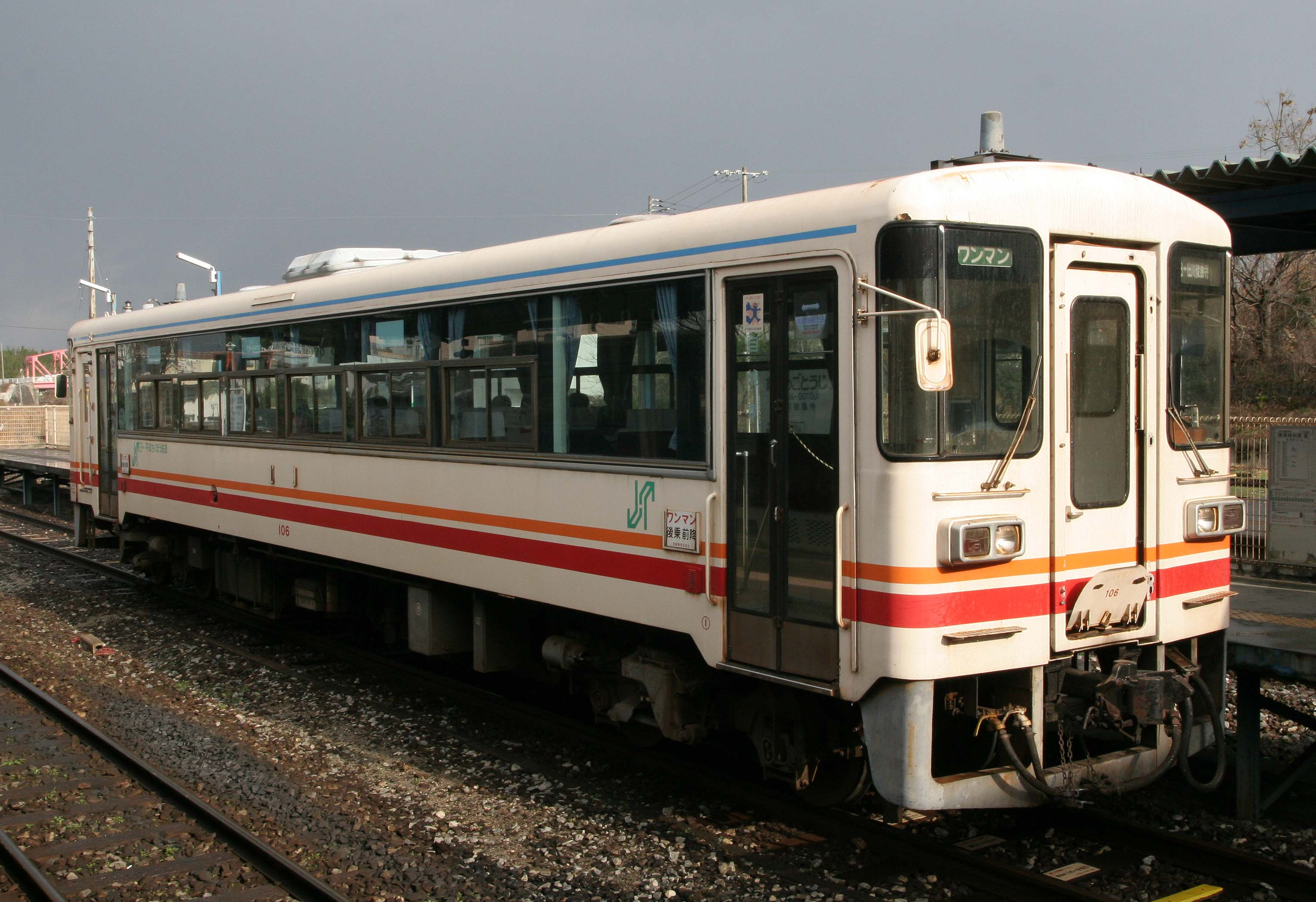
100 series DMU car 106 in December 2007

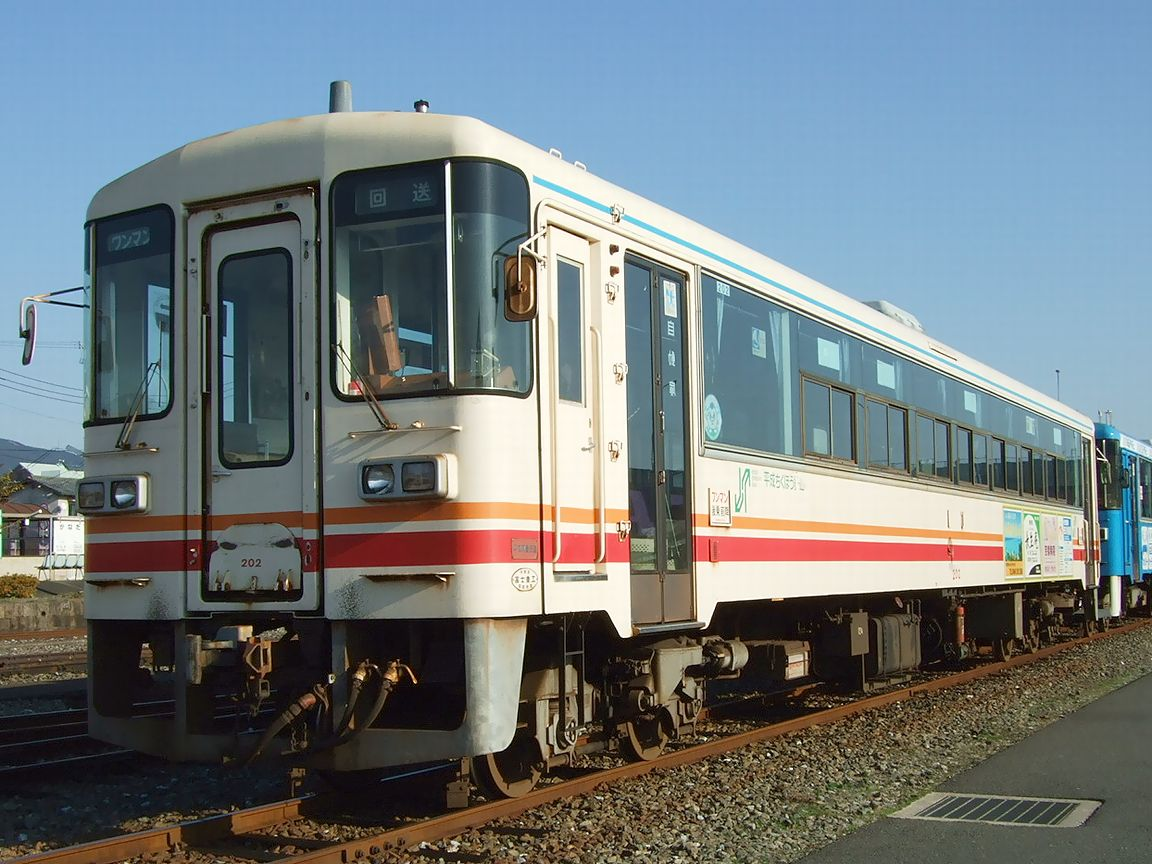
200 series DMU car in December 2007

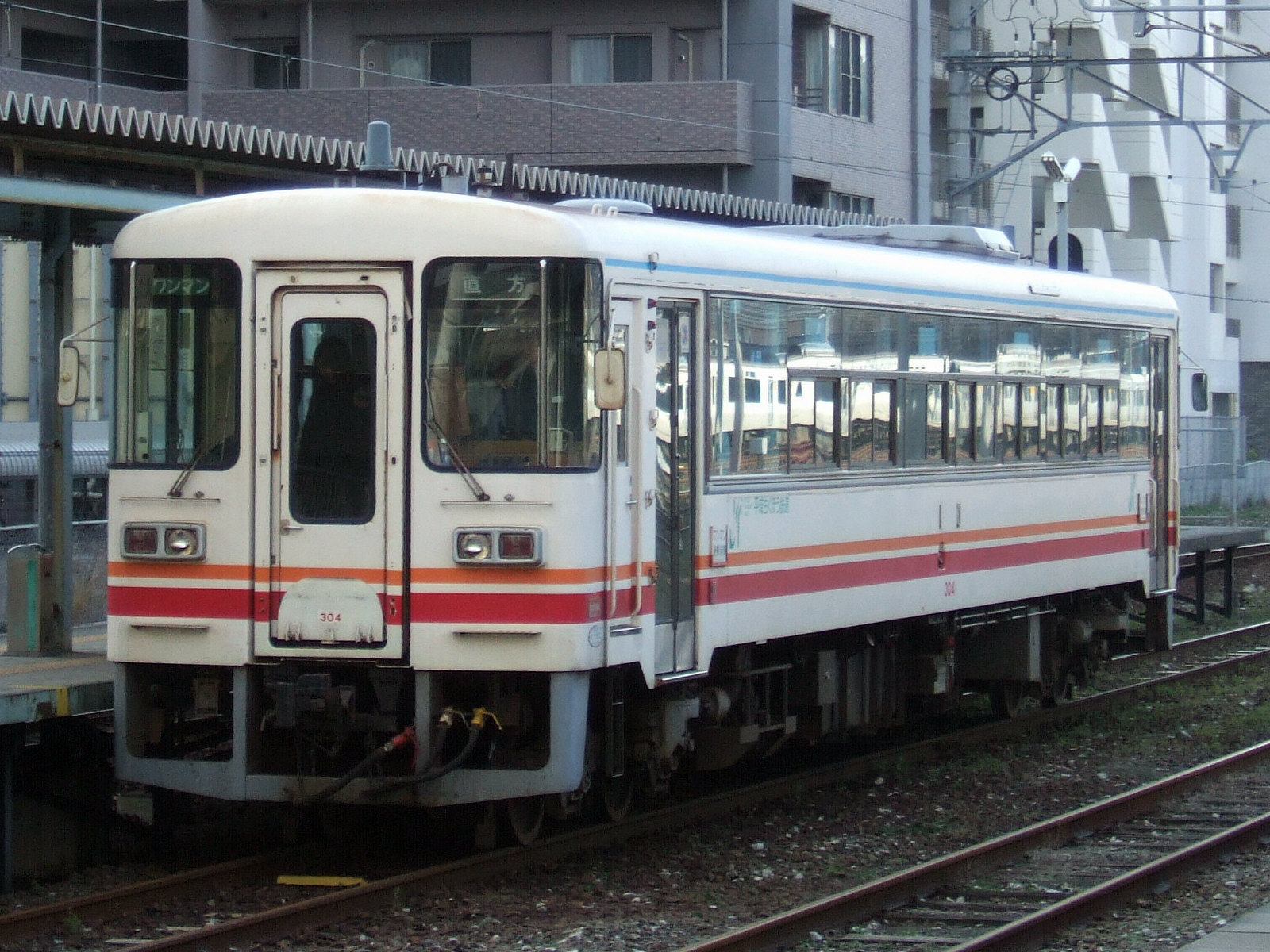
300 series DMU car 304 in March 2008

The former 300 series DMU cars operated by the railway were withdrawn December 2010. Car 303 was shipped to Myanmar, and car 304 is retained in operating condition for use on special driving days by members of the general public.

== History ==
The company was founded on April 26, 1989. On October 1, 1989, it assumed the operations of its three lines, which were formerly part of the JR Kyushu network.

On April 26, 2009, the company started the operation of the Mojikō Retro Kankō Line, a short railway for tourists in Moji-ku, Kitakyūshū.

On March 25, 2026, the company announced the abolishment of all three railway lines, with operations planned to be taken over by bus services. On August 5, the date of closure was announced as the end of fiscal year 2028.

== See also ==
- List of railway lines in Japan
