= Ichiba Station (Fukuoka) =

Railway station in Fukuchi, Fukuoka Prefecture, Japan

Ichiba Station 市場駅
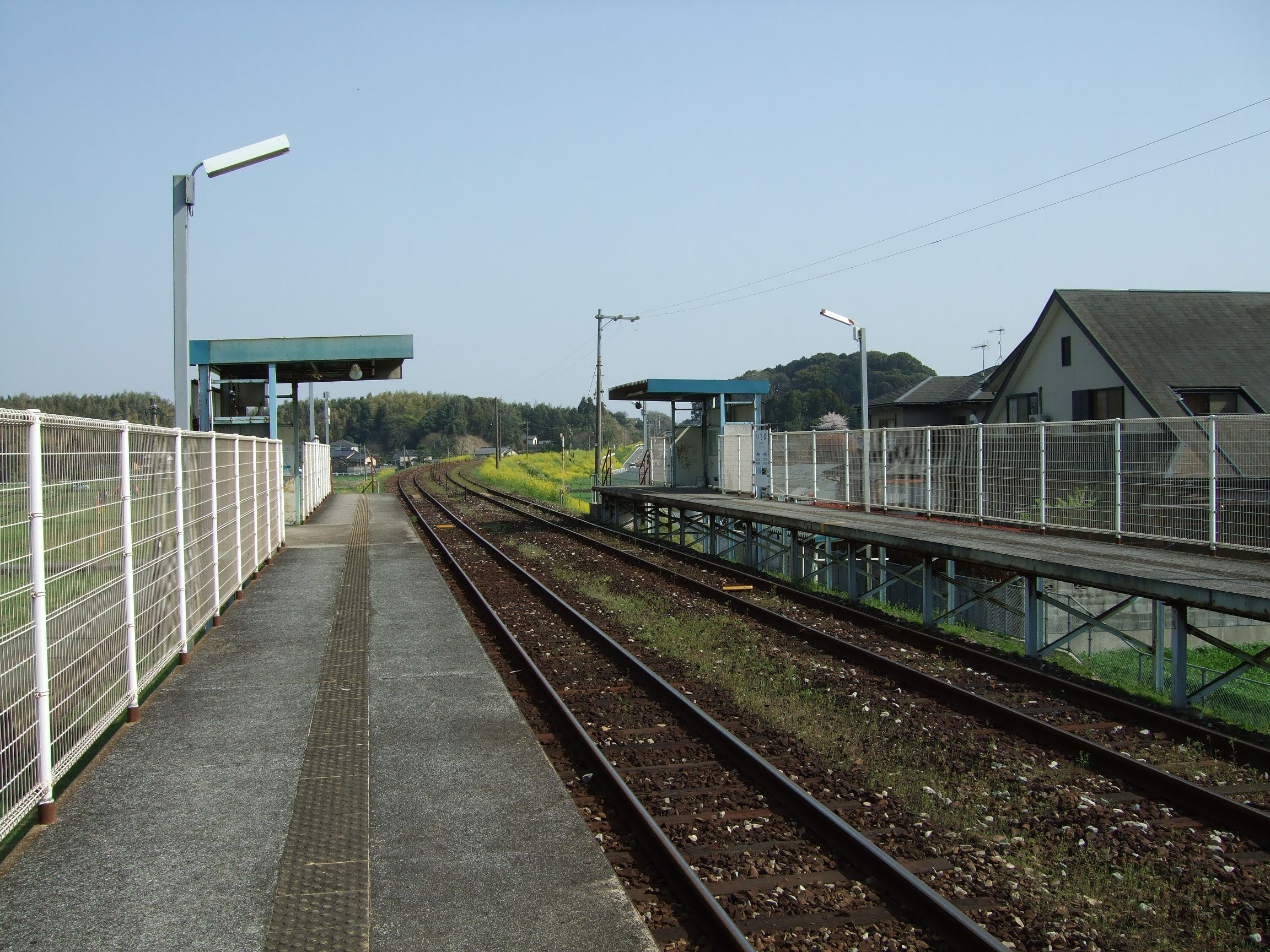
- Station platform

General information
- Location: 560-2 Ichiba, Fukuchi-cho, Tagawa-gun, Fukuoka-ken 822-1103; Japan
- Coordinates: 33.7080°N 130.7594°E
- Operator: Heisei Chikuhō Railway
- Line: ■ Ita Line
- Distance: 6.5 km (from Nōgata Station)
- Platforms: 2 side platforms

Construction
- Structure type: At-grade

Other information
- Status: Unstaffed
- Station code: HC6
- Website: Official website

History
- Opened: 1 April 1990

Services
Preceding station	Heisei Chikuhō Railway	Following station
Nakaizumi towards Nōgata	Ita Line	Fureai-Shōriki towards Tagawa-Ita
Location
- Location within Fukuoka Prefecture Location within Japan

Ichiba Station (市場駅, Ichiba-eki) is a passenger railway station located in the town of Fukuchi, Fukuoka Prefecture, Japan. It is operated by the third-sector railway operator Heisei Chikuhō Railway.

== Lines ==
Ichiba Station is served by the Ita Line and is located 6.5 km from the starting point of the line at Nōgata. Trains arrive roughly every 30 minutes.

== Layout ==
The station consists of two unnumbered opposed side platforms connected by a level crossing. There is no station building, but only a shelter on the platform. The station is unattended.

=== Platforms ===
East	■ ■ Ita Line	for Kanada, Tagawa-Ita, Yukuhashi
West	■ ■ Ita Line	for Nōgata

== History ==
The station opened on 1 April 1990.

== Surrounding area ==
- Fukuoka Prefectural Route 22 Tagawa Nogata Line (current road)

== See also ==
- List of railway stations in Japan
