= Shimoita Station =

Railway station in Tagawa, Fukuoka Prefecture, Japan

Shimoita Station 下伊田駅
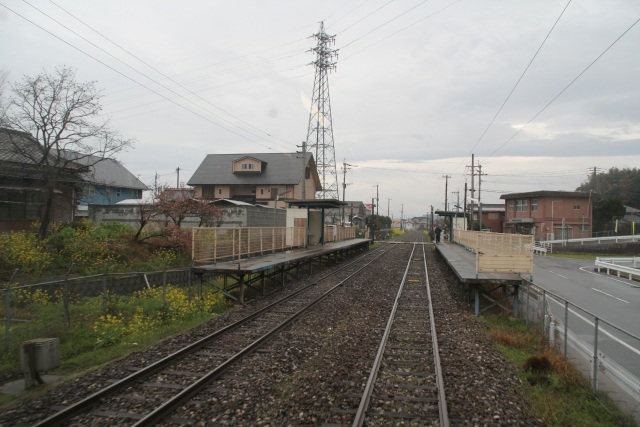
- Station platforms

General information
- Location: 4801-3 Ita, Tagawa-shi, Fukuoka-ken 825-0002; Japan
- Coordinates: 33.6520°N 130.8070°E
- Operator: Heisei Chikuhō Railway
- Line: ■ Ita Line
- Distance: 14.5 km (from Nōgata Station)
- Platforms: 2 side platforms

Construction
- Structure type: At-grade

Other information
- Status: Unstaffed
- Station code: HC14
- Website: Official website

History
- Opened: 1 April 1992

Passengers
- FY2019: 244

Services
Preceding station	Heisei Chikuhō Railway	Following station
Tagawa Municipal Hospital towards Nōgata	Ita Line	Tagawa-Ita Terminus
Location
- Location within Fukuoka Prefecture Location within Japan

Shimoita Station (下伊田駅, Shimoita-eki) is a passenger railway station located in the city of Tagawa, Fukuoka Prefecture, Japan. It is operated by the third-sector railway operator Heisei Chikuhō Railway.

== Lines ==
Shimoita Station is served by the Ita Line and is located 14.5 km from the starting point of the line at Nōgata. Trains arrive roughly every 30 minutes.

== Layout ==
The station consists of two unnumbered opposed side platforms connected by a level crossing. There is no station building, but only a shelter on the platform. The station is unattended.

=== Platforms ===
East (southbound)	■ ■ Ita Line	for Tagawa-Ita, Yukuhashi
West (northbound)	■ ■ Ita Line	for Kanada, Nōgata

== History ==
The station opened on 1 April 1992.

== Surrounding area ==
- Japan National Route 201
- Fukuoka Prefectural University
- Fukuoka Prefectural Tagawa Science and Technology High School

== See also ==
- List of railway stations in Japan
