= Hoshii Station =

Railway station in Tagawa, Fukuoka Prefecture, Japan

Hoshii Station 糒駅
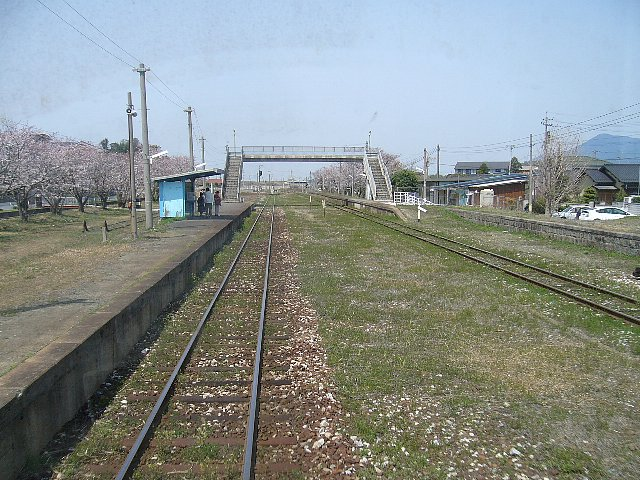
- Station platforms

General information
- Location: 2421-2 Hoshii, Tagawa-shi, Fukuoka-ken 825-0005; Japan
- Coordinates: 33.6653°N 130.7989°E
- Operator: Heisei Chikuhō Railway
- Line: ■ Ita Line
- Distance: 12.8 km (from Nōgata Station)
- Platforms: 2 side platforms

Construction
- Structure type: At-grade

Other information
- Status: Unstaffed
- Station code: HC12
- Website: Official website

History
- Opened: 17 September 1900

Passengers
- FY2019: 122

Services
| Preceding station | Heisei Chikuhō Railway | Following station |
|---|---|---|
| Kami-Kanada towards Nōgata | Ita Line | Tagawa Municipal Hospital towards Tagawa-Ita |
Location
- Location within Fukuoka Prefecture Location within Japan

Hoshii Station (糒駅, Hoshii-eki) is a passenger railway station located in the city of Tagawa, Fukuoka Prefecture, Japan. It is operated by the third-sector railway operator Heisei Chikuhō Railway. On 1 April 2009, a local recycling plant, Kanda Shōten, acquired naming rights to the station. Therefore, the station is alternatively known as Kanda Shōten Hoshii Station (神田商店糒駅, Kanda-Shōten-Hoshii-eki).

== Lines ==
Hoshii Station is served by the Ita Line and is located 12.8 km from the starting point of the line at Nōgata. Trains arrive roughly every 30 minutes.

== Layout ==
The station consists of two unnumbered opposed side platforms connected by a footbridge. There is no station building, but only a shelter on the platform. The station is unattended.

=== Platforms ===
| East (southbound) | ■ ■ Ita Line | for Tagawa-Ita, Yukuhashi |
| West (northbound) | ■ ■ Ita Line | for Kanada, Nōgata |

== History ==
The station opened on 17 September 1900 as a station on the Kyushu Railway. The railway was nationalized on 1 July 1907. With the privatization of the JNR on 1 April 1987, the station became part of JR Kyushu. It was transferred to the Heisei Chikuhō Railway on 1 October 1989,

== Surrounding area ==
- Fukuoka Prefectural Route 22 Tagawa Noho Line
- Fukuoka Prefectural Route 405 Kaharu Itoda Line

== See also ==
- List of railway stations in Japan
