= Tagawa Municipal Hospital Station =

Railway station in Tagawa, Fukuoka Prefecture, Japan

Tagawa Municipal Hospital Station 田川市立病院駅
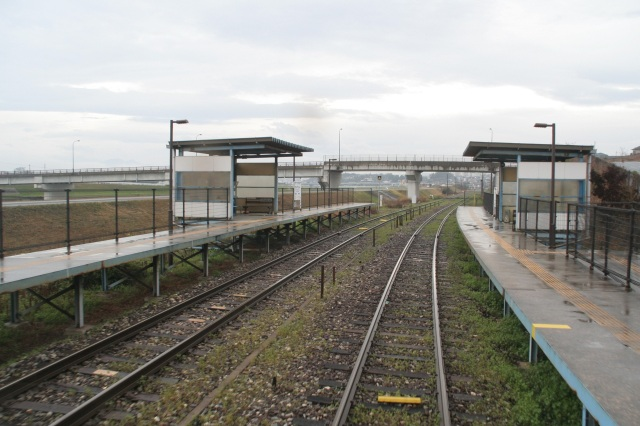
- Station platforms

General information
- Location: 1722-3 Hoshii, Tagawa-shi, Fukuoka-ken 825-0005; Japan
- Coordinates: 33.6607°N 130.8026°E
- Operator: Heisei Chikuhō Railway
- Line: ■ Ita Line
- Distance: 13.4 km (from Nōgata Station)
- Platforms: 2 side platforms

Construction
- Structure type: At-grade

Other information
- Status: Unstaffed
- Station code: HC13
- Website: Official website

History
- Opened: 22 March 1999

Passengers
- FY2019: 200

Services
Preceding station	Heisei Chikuhō Railway	Following station
Hoshii towards Nōgata	Ita Line	Shimoita towards Tagawa-Ita
Location
- Location within Fukuoka Prefecture Location within Japan

Tagawa Municipal Hospital Station (田川市立病院駅, Tagawa-Shiritsu-Byōin-eki) is a passenger railway station located in the city of Tagawa, Fukuoka Prefecture, Japan. It is operated by the third-sector railway operator Heisei Chikuhō Railway.

== Lines ==
Tagawa Municipal Hospital Station is served by the Ita Line and is located 13.4 km from the starting point of the line at Nōgata. Trains arrive roughly every 30 minutes.

== Layout ==
The station consists of two unnumbered opposed side platforms connected by a level crossing. There is no station building, but only a shelter on the platform. The station is unattended.

=== Platforms ===
East	■ ■ Ita Line	for Tagawa-Ita, Yukuhashi
West	■ ■ Ita Line	for Kanada, Nōgata

== History ==
The station opened on 13 March 1999.

== Surrounding area ==
As the name suggests, this station is located near the Tagawa Municipal Hospital. A shuttle transports passengers between the hospital and the station.

== See also ==
- List of railway stations in Japan
