= Nakaizumi Station =

Railway station in Nōgata, Fukuoka Prefecture, Japan

Nakaizumi Station 中泉駅
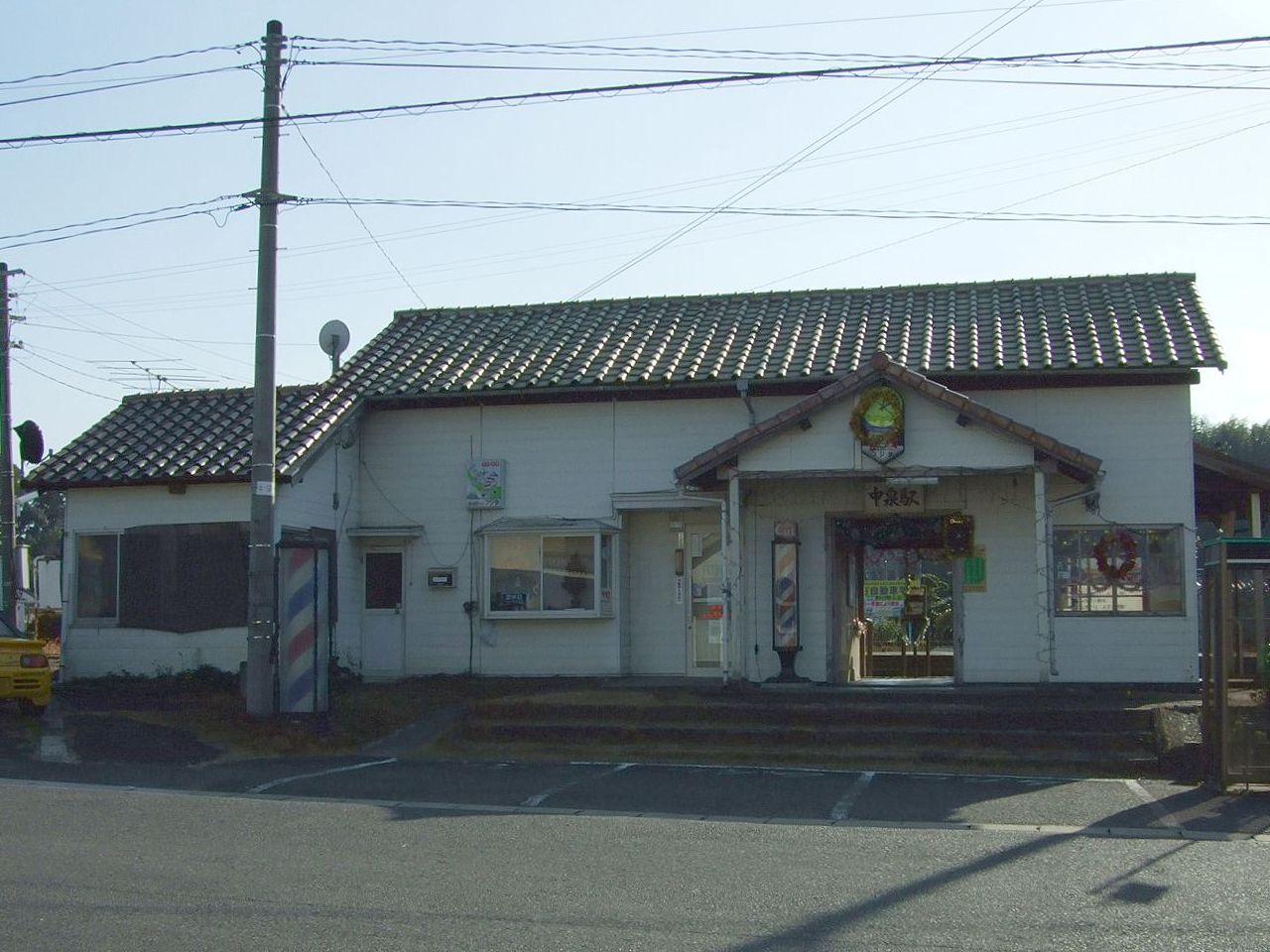
- Station entrance

General information
- Other names: Osaka Sun News Nakaizumi Station
- Location: 395-1-2 Nakaizumi, Nōgata-shi, Fukuoka-ken 822-0011; Japan
- Coordinates: 33.7210°N 130.7424°E
- Operator: Heisei Chikuhō Railway
- Line: ■ Ita Line
- Distance: 4.3 km (from Nōgata Station)
- Platforms: 2 side platforms

Construction
- Structure type: At-grade

Other information
- Status: Unstaffed
- Station code: HC5

History
- Opened: 9 February 1898

Passengers
- FY2019: 79

Services
Preceding station	Heisei Chikuhō Railway	Following station
Fujitana towards Nōgata	Ita Line	Ichiba towards Tagawa-Ita
Location
- Location within Fukuoka Prefecture Location within Japan

Nakaizumi Station (中泉駅, Nakaizumi-eki) is a passenger railway station located in the city of Nōgata, Fukuoka Prefecture, Japan. It is operated by the third-sector railway operator Heisei Chikuhō Railway. On 1 April 2009, an Osaka-based interior design firm, Osaka Sun News, acquired naming rights to the station. Therefore, the station is alternatively known as Osaka Sun News Akaike Station (大阪サンニュース中泉駅, Ōsaka-San-Nyūsu-Nakaizumi-eki).

== Lines ==
Nakaizumi Station is served by the Ita Line and is located 4.3 km from the starting point of the line at Nōgata. Trains arrive roughly every 30 minutes. Trains arrive roughly every 30 minutes.

== Layout ==
The station consists of two unnumbered opposed side platforms connected by a level crossing. The station is unattended.

=== Platforms ===
Station side	■ ■ Ita Line	for Kanada, Tagawa-Ita, Tagawa-Gotōji, Yukuhashi
Opposite side	■ ■ Ita Line	for Nōgata

== History ==
The station opened on 9 February 1898 on the Kyushu Railway. The Kyushu Railway was nationalized in 1907. With the privatization of the JNR on 1 April 1987, the station came under JR Kyushu. It was transferred to the Heisei Chikuho Railway on 1 October 1989.

== Surrounding area ==
The station is located in the southern part of Nogata.

- Nogata City Nakaizumi Elementary School
- Nakaizumi Post Office

== See also ==
- List of railway stations in Japan
