= Fujitana Station =

Railway station in Nōgata, Fukuoka Prefecture, Japan

Fujitana Station 藤棚駅
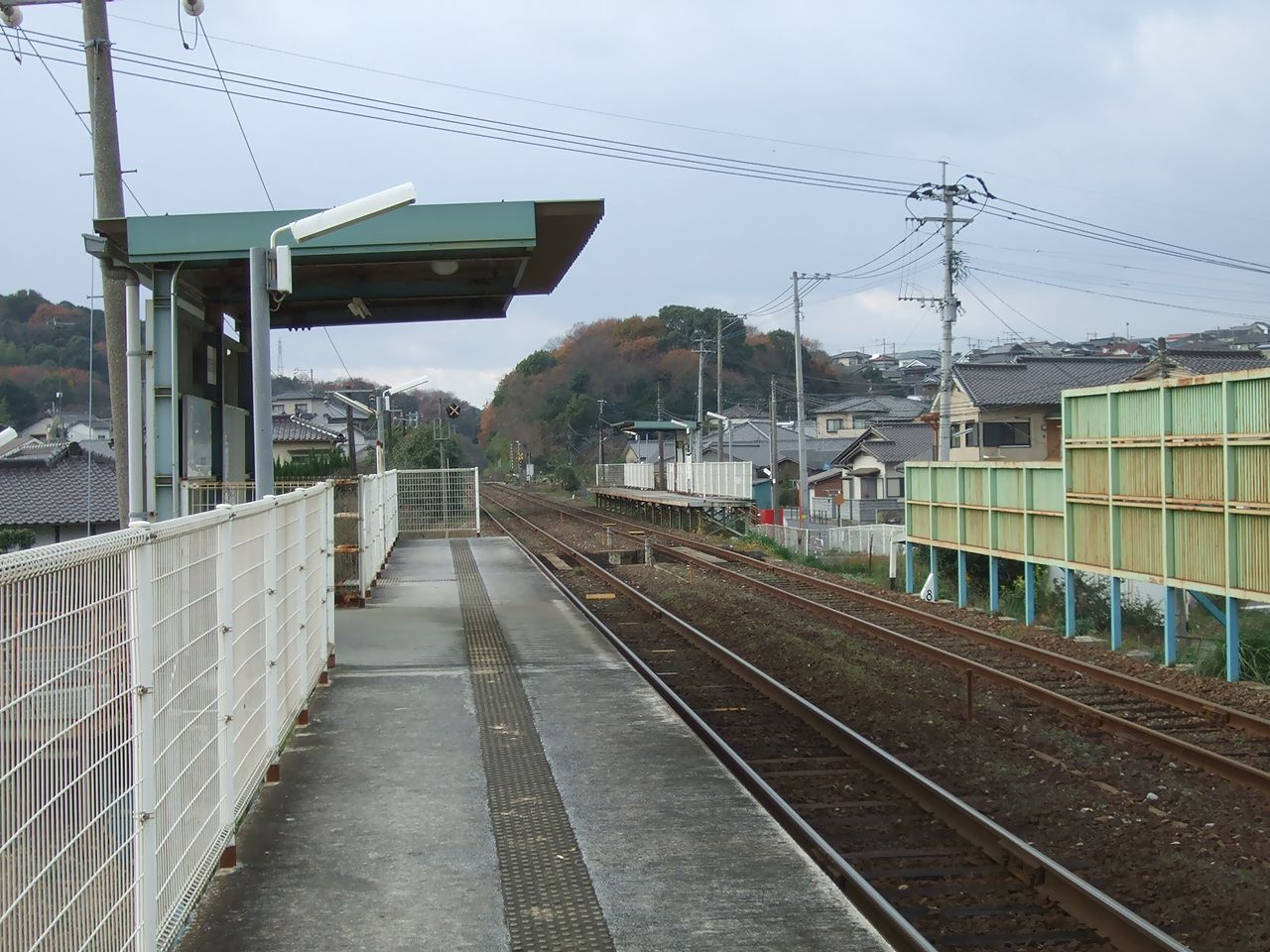
- Station platform

General information
- Location: 3910-2 Shimozakai, Nōgata-shi, Fukuoka-ken 822-0007; Japan
- Coordinates: 33.7221°N 130.7349°E
- Operator: Heisei Chikuhō Railway
- Line: ■ Ita Line
- Distance: 3.6 km (from Nōgata Station)
- Platforms: 2 side platforms

Construction
- Structure type: At-grade

Other information
- Status: Unstaffed
- Station code: HC4

History
- Opened: 22 December 1990

Passengers
- FY2019: 216

Services
Preceding station	Heisei Chikuhō Railway	Following station
Akaji towards Nōgata	Ita Line	Nakaizumi towards Tagawa-Ita
Location
- Location within Fukuoka Prefecture Location within Japan

Fujitana Station (藤棚駅, Fujitana-eki) is a passenger railway station located in the city of Nōgata, Fukuoka Prefecture, Japan. It is operated by the third-sector railway operator Heisei Chikuhō Railway.

== Lines ==
Fujitana Station is served by the Ita Line and is located 3.6 km from the starting point of the line at Nōgata. Trains arrive roughly every 30 minutes.

== Layout ==
The station consists of two unnumbered opposed side platforms connected by a level crossing. The station is unattended.

=== Platforms ===
North	■ ■ Ita Line	for Kanada, Tagawa-Ita, Tagawa-Gotōji, Yukuhashi
South	■ ■ Ita Line	for Nōgata

== History ==
The station opened on 22 December 1990.

== Surrounding area ==
- Nogata City Nakaizumi Elementary School
- Takayama Hospital

== See also ==
- List of railway stations in Japan
