= Fureai-Shōriki Station =

Railway station in Fukuchi, Fukuoka Prefecture, Japan

Fureai-Shōriki Station ふれあい生力駅
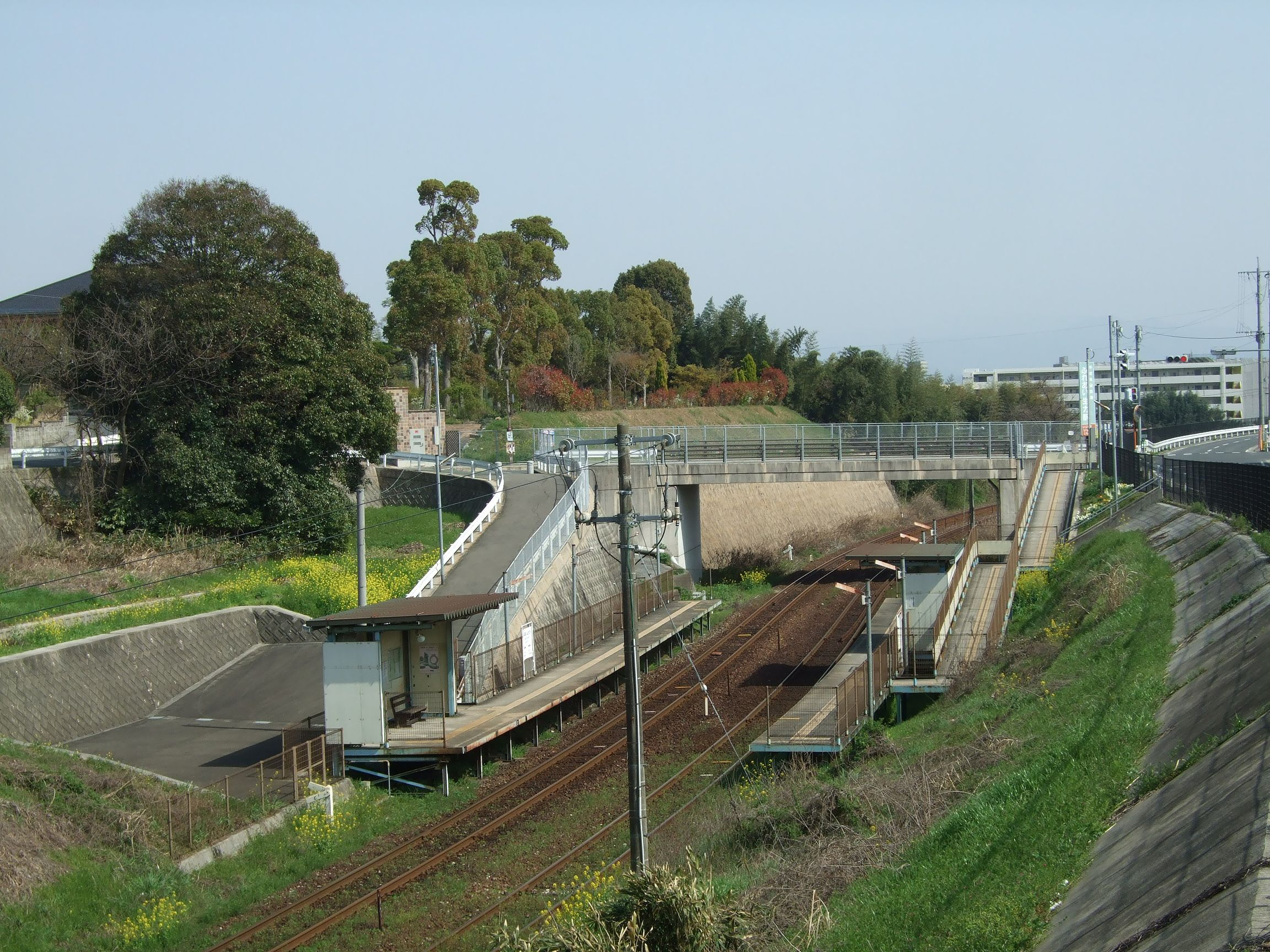
- Station platform

General information
- Location: 1026-2 Akaike, Fukuchi-cho, Tagawa-gun, Fukuoka-ken 822-1103; Japan
- Coordinates: 33.6873°N 130.7712°E
- Operator: Heisei Chikuhō Railway
- Line: ■ Ita Line
- Distance: 7.6 km (from Nōgata Station)
- Platforms: 2 side platforms

Construction
- Structure type: At-grade

Other information
- Status: Unstaffed
- Station code: HC7
- Website: Official website

History
- Opened: 22 March 1997

Services
Preceding station	Heisei Chikuhō Railway	Following station
Ichiba towards Nōgata	Ita Line	Akaike towards Tagawa-Ita
Location
- Location within Fukuoka Prefecture Location within Japan

Fureai-Shōriki Station (ふれあい生力駅, Fureai-Shōriki-eki) is a passenger railway station located in the town of Fukuchi, Fukuoka Prefecture, Japan. It is operated by the third-sector railway operator Heisei Chikuhō Railway.

== Lines ==
Fureai-Shōriki Station is served by the Ita Line and is located 7.6 km from the starting point of the line at Nōgata. Trains arrive roughly every 30 minutes.

== Layout ==
The station consists of two unnumbered opposed side platforms connected by a footbridge. There is no station building, but only a shelter on the platform. The station is unattended.

=== Platforms ===
East	■ ■ Ita Line	for Kanada, Tagawa-Ita, Yukuhashi
West	■ ■ Ita Line	for Nōgata

== History ==
The station opened on 22 March 1997.

== Surrounding area ==
It is located at the northern end of the central area of the former Akaike Town. The surrounding area is a residential area called Akaike New Town.

== See also ==
- List of railway stations in Japan
