= Coto Coto Train =

Tourist train in Fukuoka, Japan

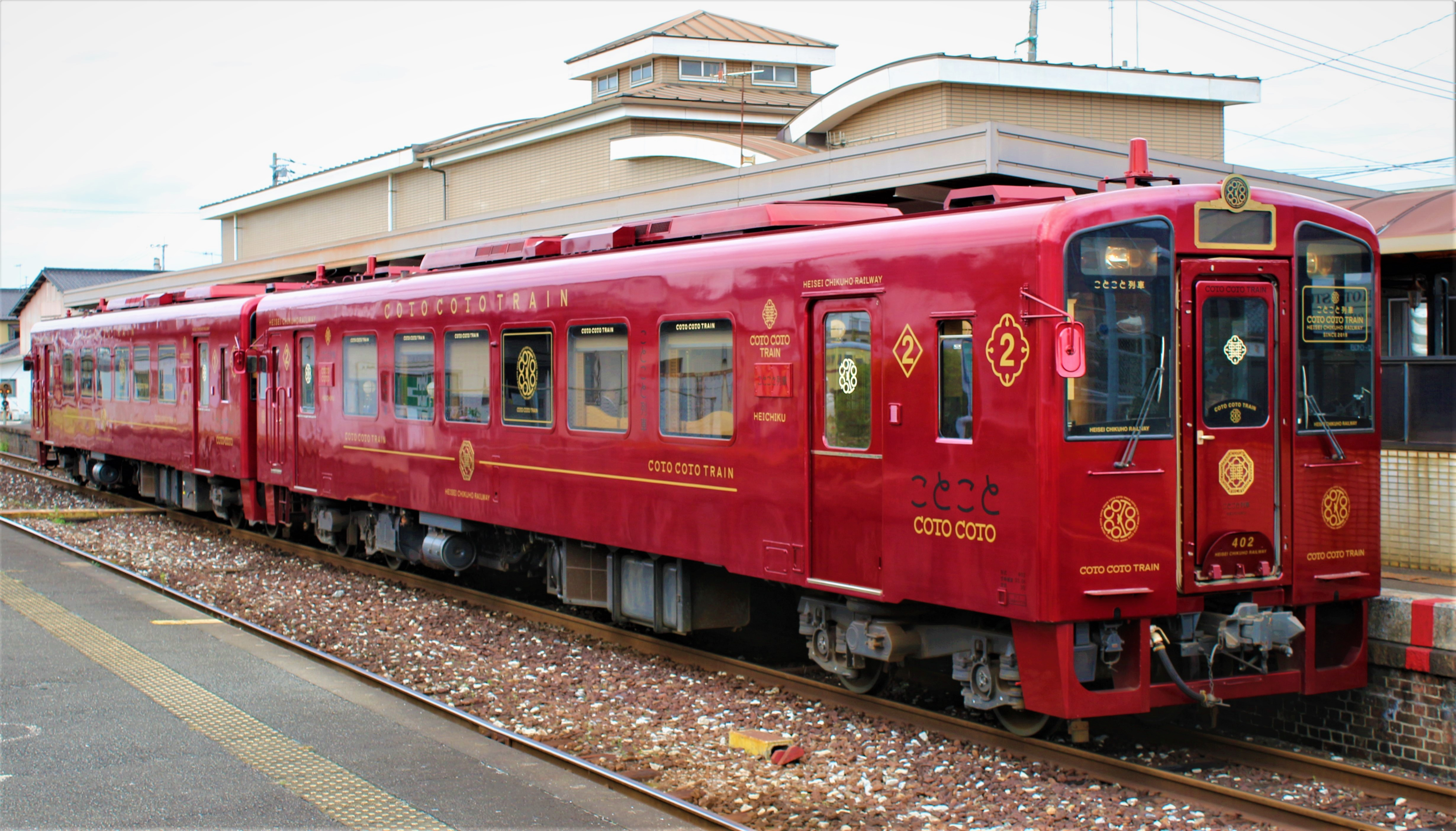
Heisei Chikuhō Railway 400 type diesel train 401 + 402 "Coto Coto Train"

The Coto Coto Train is a touristic train service in the Fukuoka Prefecture region of Kyushu, southern Japan.

The service started in 2019. The train is run by the Heisei Chikuhō Railway Company. It was designed by Eiji Mitooka and is based on the concept of “relaxation, delicious food, and fun”. The train is bright red on the outside with a wooden interior using Ōkawa "kumiko" (lattice) woodwork and stained glass ceilings. Food is served using local natural ingredients. The service is slow for sightseeing purposes and has 48 seats.

The train passes through the former coal mining area of Chikuhō (now part of Iizuka, Kaho District). The name "Coto Coto" sounds like the noise of the train. The service includes French cuisine produced by Takeshi Fukuyama, a chef from Fukuoka. The ingredients in the appetizers come from nine cities, towns, and villages on the route used by the train.

Ita Line (伊田線, orange) and Tagawa Line (田川線, blue) used by the Coto Coto Train

The service follows Nōgata – Tagawaita – Nōgata (again) – Yukuhashi, using the Ita Line (伊田線) and the Tagawa Line (田川線). It takes 3 hours 20 minutes in total.
