= Akaike Station (Fukuoka) =

Railway station in Fukuchi, Fukuoka Prefecture, Japan

Akaike Station 赤池駅
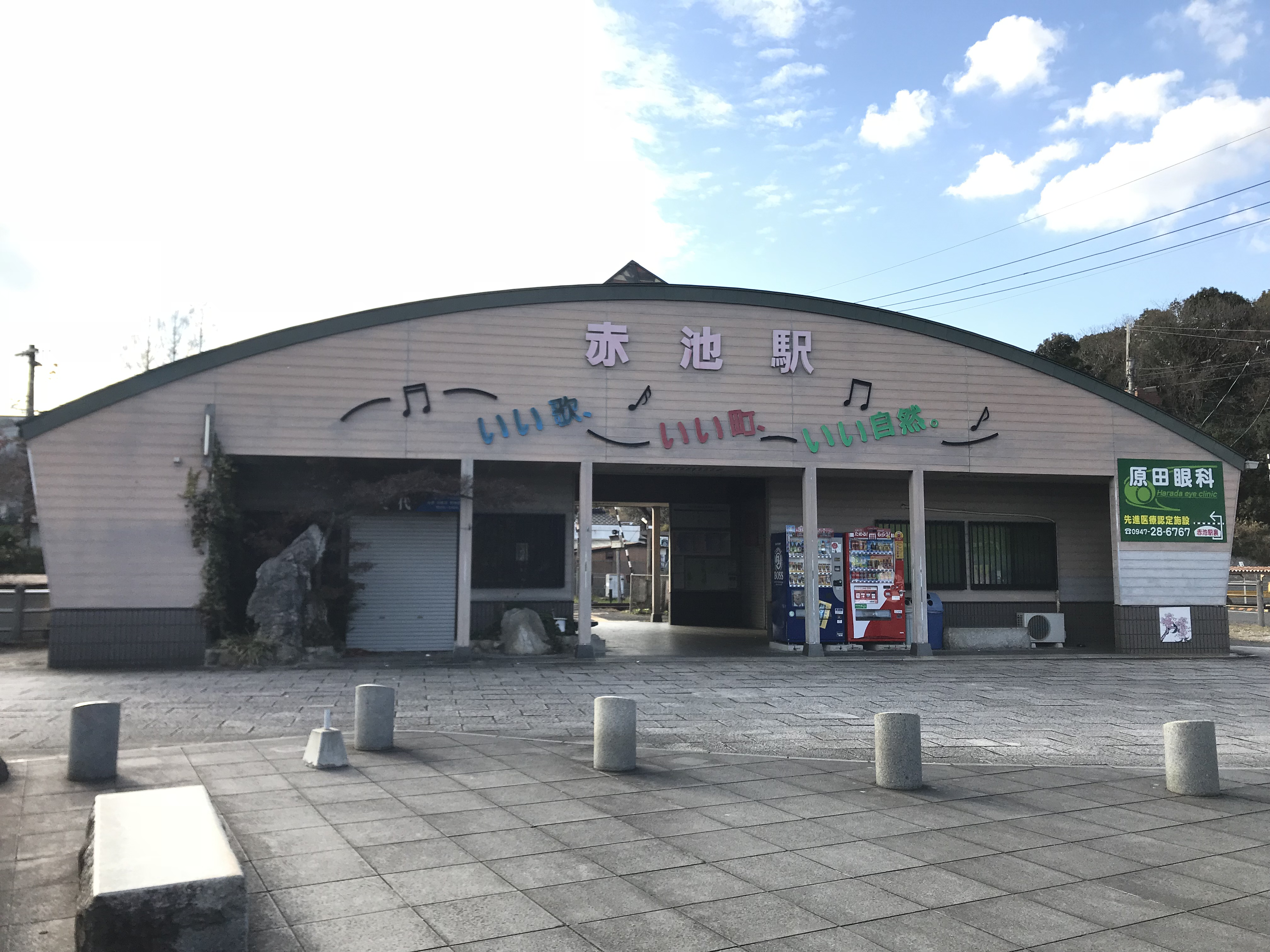
- Station entrance

General information
- Other names: Harada Eye Clinic Akaike Station
- Location: 298-9 Akaike, Fukuchi-cho, Tagawa-gun, Fukuoka-ken 822-1101; Japan
- Coordinates: 33.6926°N 130.7686°E
- Operator: Heisei Chikuhō Railway
- Line: ■ Ita Line
- Distance: 8.5 km (from Nōgata Station)
- Platforms: 2 side platforms

Construction
- Structure type: At-grade

Other information
- Status: Unstaffed
- Station code: HC8
- Website: Official website

History
- Opened: 1 April 1904

Services
Preceding station	Heisei Chikuhō Railway	Following station
Fureai-Shōriki towards Nōgata	Ita Line	Hitomi towards Tagawa-Ita
Location
- Location within Fukuoka Prefecture Location within Japan

Akaike Station (赤池駅, Akaike-eki) is a passenger railway station located in the town of Fukuchi, Fukuoka Prefecture, Japan. It is operated by the third-sector railway operator Heisei Chikuhō Railway. A nearby ophthalmology clinic, Harada Eye Clinic, purchased naming rights to the station. Therefore, the station is alternatively known as Harada Eye Clinic Akaike Station (原田眼科赤池駅, Harada-Ganka-eki).

== Lines ==
Akaike Station is served by the Ita Line and is located 8.5 km from the starting point of the line at Nōgata. Trains arrive roughly every 30 minutes.

== Layout ==
The station consists of two unnumbered opposed side platforms connected by a level crossing. The station is unattended.

=== Platforms ===
Station side	■ ■ Ita Line	for Kanada, Tagawa-Ita, Tagawa-Gotōji, Yukuhashi
Opposite side	■ ■ Ita Line	for Nōgata

== History ==
The station opened on 1 April 1904 as a freight-only station on the Kyushu Railway, primarily for the transportation of coal from nearby mines. The area was a center for river and canal traffic, and the boatmen and local innkeepers dependent on river traffic strong opposed the opening of the station. As a result, the Kyushu Railway bypassed Akaike for its passenger services, and the next station on the line, Kanada Station, quickly developed into a prosperous town. The Kyushu Railway was nationalized in 1907 and the station renamed the "Akaike Signal Stop" in 1910. It was promoted to a passenger station on 25 June 1937, becoming Akaike Station. With the privatization of the JNR on 1 April 1987, the station came under JR Kyushu. It was transferred to the Heisei Chikuho Railway on 1 October 1989.

== Surrounding area ==
The statin is located at the southern end of the former Akaike Town.

== See also ==
- List of railway stations in Japan
