= Minami-Nōgata-Gotenguchi Station =

Railway station in Nōgata, Fukuoka Prefecture, Japan

Minami-Nōgata-Gotenguchi Station 南直方御殿口駅
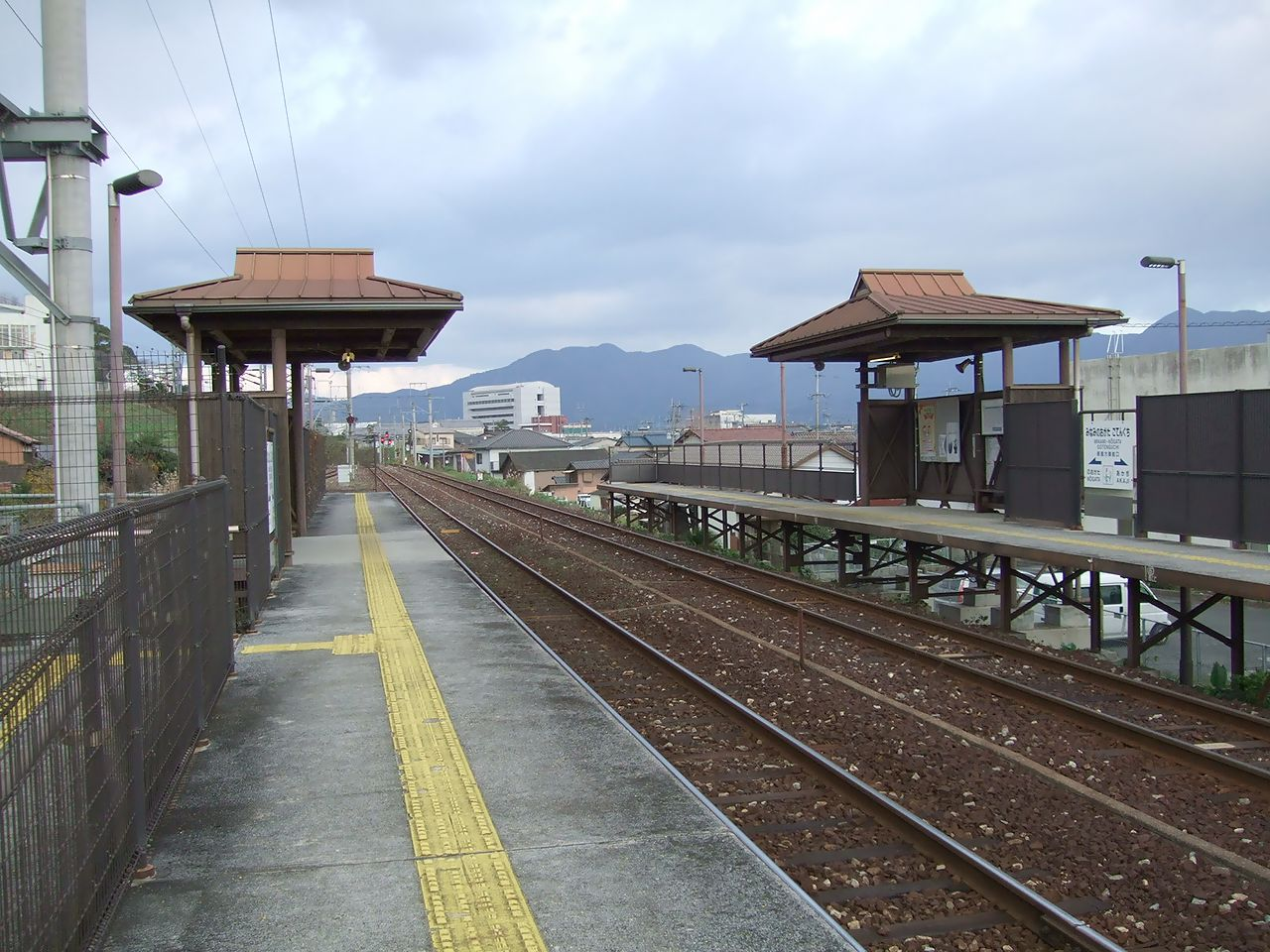
- Station platform

General information
- Location: 2-chōme-1 Shinmachi, Nōgata-shi, Fukuoka-ken 822-0015; Japan
- Coordinates: 33.7387°N 130.7248°E
- Operator: Heisei Chikuhō Railway
- Line: ■ Ita Line
- Distance: 1.1 km (from Nōgata Station)
- Platforms: 2 side platforms

Construction
- Structure type: At-grade

Other information
- Status: Unstaffed

History
- Opened: 3 March 2001

Passengers
- FY2019: 65

Services
Preceding station	Heisei Chikuhō Railway	Following station
Nōgata Terminus	Ita Line	Akaji towards Tagawa-Ita
Location
- Location within Fukuoka Prefecture Location within Japan

Minami-Nōgata-Gotenguchi Station (南直方御殿口駅, Minami-Nōgata-Gotenguchi-eki) is a passenger railway station located in the city of Nōgata, Fukuoka Prefecture, Japan. It is operated by the third-sector railway operator Heisei Chikuhō Railway. On 1 April 2009, an Osaka-based interior design firm, Osaka Sun News, acquired naming rights to the station. Therefore, the station is alternatively known as Osaka Sun News Akaike Station (大阪サンニュース中泉駅, Ōsaka-San-Nyūsu-Nakaizumi-eki).

== Lines ==
Minami-Nōgata-Gotenguchi Station is served by the Ita Line and is located 1.1 km from the starting point of the line at Nōgata. Trains arrive roughly every 30 minutes.Trains arrive roughly every 30 minutes.

== Layout ==
The station consists of two unnumbered opposed side platforms connected by a level crossing. The station is unattended.

=== Platforms ===
East	■ ■ Ita Line	for Kanada, Tagawa-Ita, Tagawa-Gotōji, Yukuhashi
West	■ ■ Ita Line	for Nōgata

== History ==
The station opened on 2 March 2001.

== Surrounding area ==
- Nogata City Nogata Minami Elementary School
- Nogata City Nogata Nishi Elementary School

== See also ==
- List of railway stations in Japan
