= Hitomi Station =

Railway station in Fukuchi, Fukuoka Prefecture, Japan

Hitomi Station 人見駅
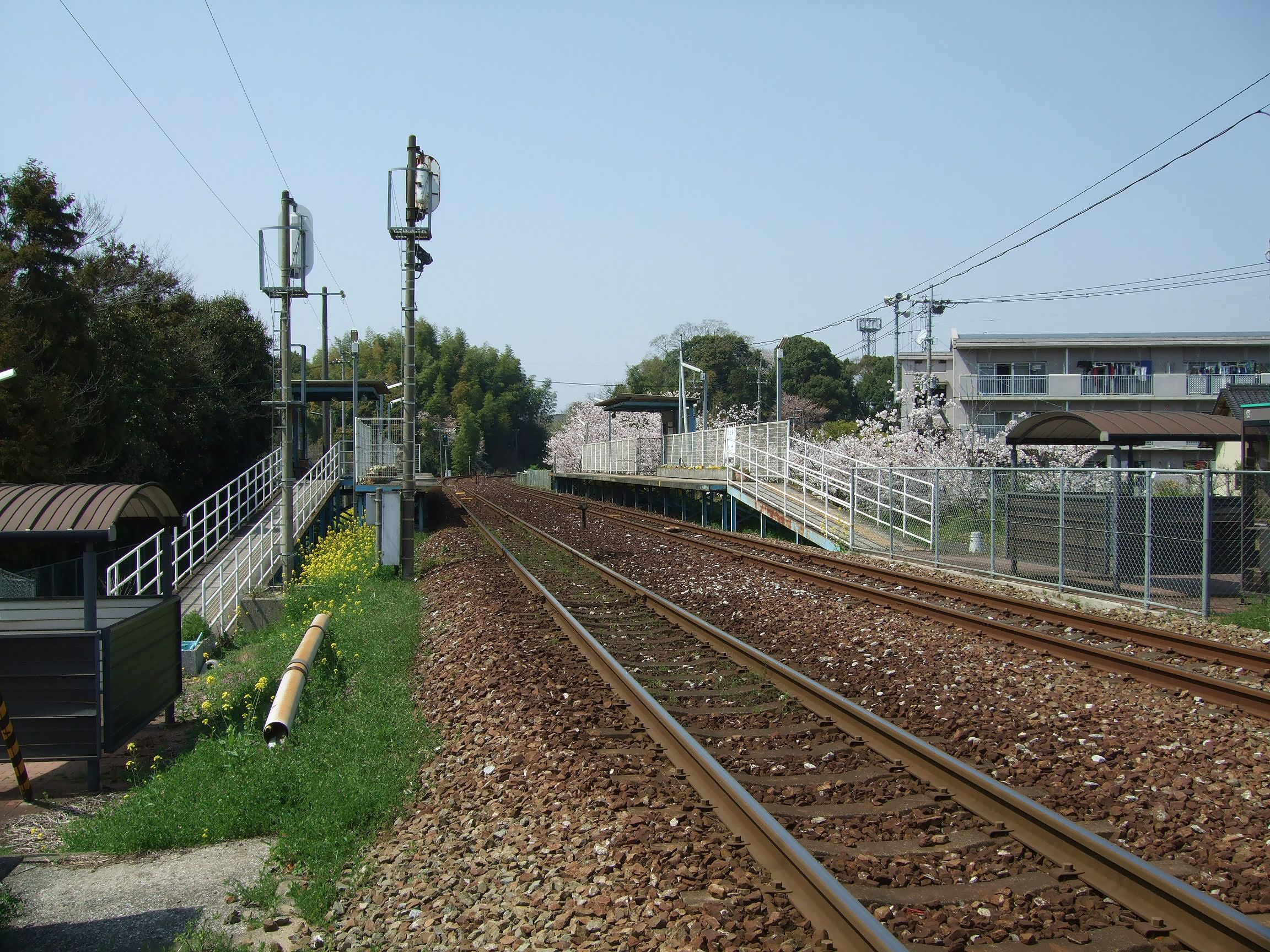
- Station platforms

General information
- Location: 1565-2 Kanada, Fukuchi-cho, Tagawa-gun, Fukuoka-ken 822-1201; Japan
- Coordinates: 33.6873°N 130.7712°E
- Operator: Heisei Chikuhō Railway
- Line: ■ Ita Line
- Distance: 9.1 km (from Nōgata Station)
- Platforms: 2 side platforms

Construction
- Structure type: At-grade

Other information
- Status: Unstaffed
- Station code: HC9
- Website: Official website

History
- Opened: 1 April 1990

Services
| Preceding station | Heisei Chikuhō Railway | Following station |
|---|---|---|
| Akaike towards Nōgata | Ita Line | Kanada towards Tagawa-Ita |
Location
- Location within Fukuoka Prefecture Location within Japan

Hitomi Station (人見駅, Hitomi-eki) is a passenger railway station located in the town of Fukuchi, Fukuoka Prefecture, Japan. It is operated by the third-sector railway operator Heisei Chikuhō Railway.

== Lines ==
Hitomi Station is served by the Ita Line and is located 9.1 km from the starting point of the line at Nōgata. Trains arrive roughly every 30 minutes.

== Layout ==
The station consists of two unnumbered opposed side platforms connected by a footbridge. There is no station building, but only a shelter on the platform. The station is unattended.

=== Platforms ===
| East | ■ ■ Ita Line | for Kanada, Tagawa-Ita, Yukuhashi |
| West | ■ ■ Ita Line | for Nōgata |

== History ==
The station opened on 1 April 1990.

== Surrounding area ==
- Fukuoka Prefectural Route 22 Tagawa Noho Line
- Fukuoka Prefectural Route 406 Akaike Itoda Line

== See also ==
- List of railway stations in Japan
