= Kami-Kanada Station =

Railway station in Fukuchi, Fukuoka Prefecture, Japan

Kami-Kanada Station 上金田駅
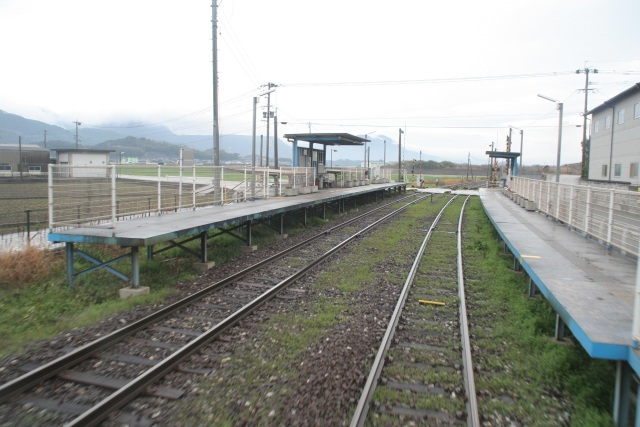
- Station platforms

General information
- Location: 86-2 Kanada, Fukuchi-cho, Tagawa-gun, Fukuoka^ken 822-1201; Japan
- Coordinates: 33.6723°N 130.7898°E
- Operator: Heisei Chikuhō Railway
- Line: ■ Ita Line
- Distance: 11.6 km (from Nōgata Station)
- Platforms: 2 side platforms

Construction
- Structure type: At-grade

Other information
- Status: Unstaffed
- Station code: HC11
- Website: Official website

History
- Opened: 1 April 1990

Passengers
- FY2018: 181

Services
Preceding station	Heisei Chikuhō Railway	Following station
Kanada towards Nōgata	Ita Line	Hoshii towards Tagawa-Ita
Location
- Location within Fukuoka Prefecture Location within Japan

Kami-Kanada Station (上金田駅, Kami-Kanada-eki) is a passenger railway station located in the town of Fukuchi, Fukuoka Prefecture, Japan. It is operated by the third-sector railway operator Heisei Chikuhō Railway.

== Lines ==
Kami-Kanada Station is served by the Ita Line and is located 11.6 km from the starting point of the line at Nōgata. Trains arrive roughly every 30 minutes.

== Layout ==
The station consists of two unnumbered opposed side platforms connected by a level crossing. There is no station building, but only a shelter on each platform. The station is unattended.

=== Platforms ===
East (southbound)	■ ■ Ita Line	for Tagawa-Ita, Yukuhashi
West (northbound)	■ ■ Ita Line	for Kanada, Nōgata

== History ==
The station opened on 1 April 1990.

== Surrounding area ==
- Fukuoka Prefectural Route 22 Tagawa Noho Line
- Fukuoka Prefectural Route 456 Kaneda Natsuyoshi Ida Line

== See also ==
- List of railway stations in Japan
