= Akaji Station =

Railway station in Kotake, Fukuoka Prefecture, Japan

Akaji Station あかぢ駅
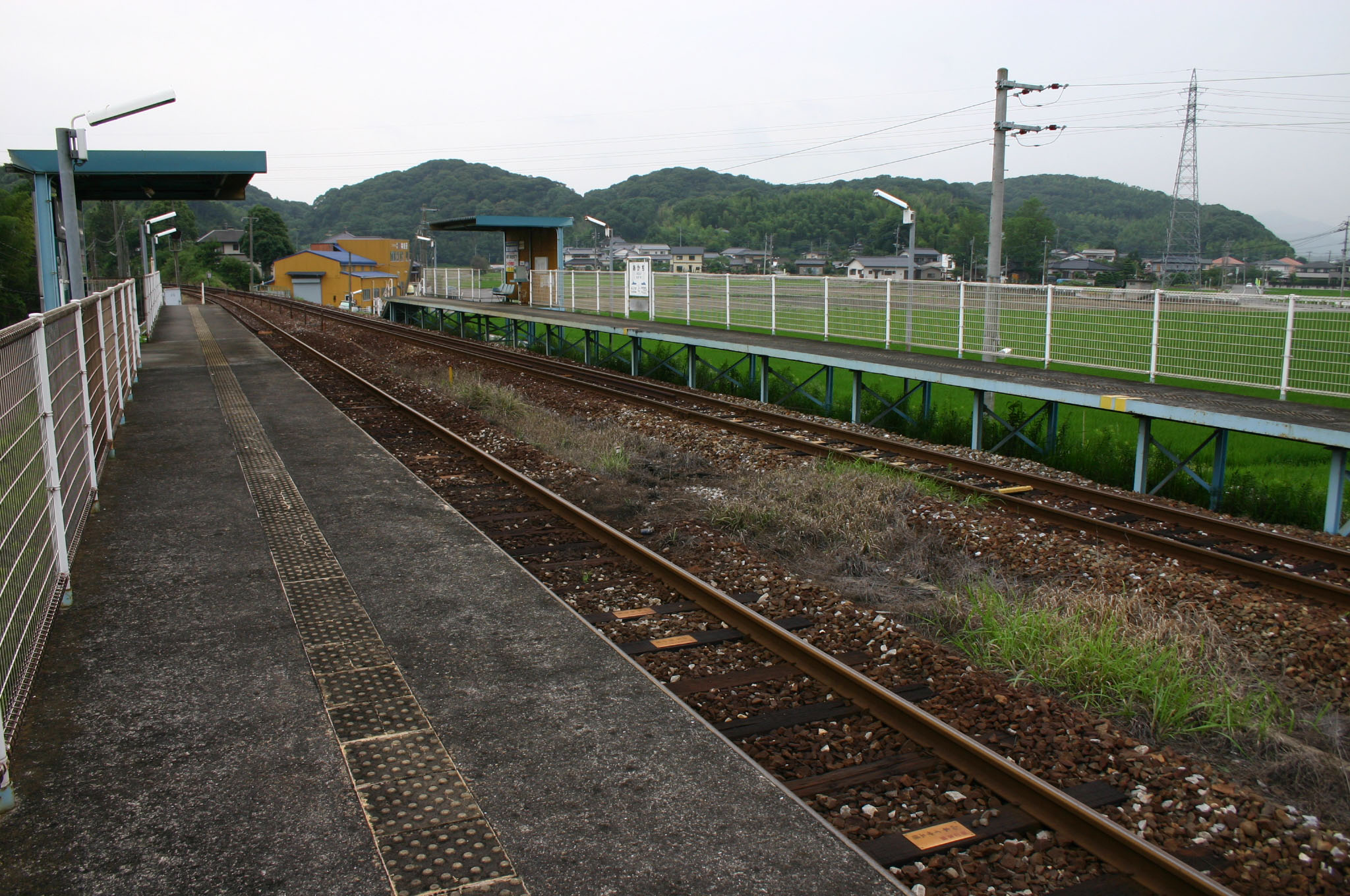
- Station platform

General information
- Location: Akaji, Kotake-cho, Kurate-gun, Fukuoka-ken 820-1102; Japan
- Coordinates: 33.7273°N 130.7245°E
- Operator: Heisei Chikuhō Railway
- Line: ■ Ita Line
- Distance: 2.4 km (from Nōgata Station)
- Platforms: 2 side platforms

Construction
- Structure type: At-grade

Other information
- Status: Unstaffed
- Station code: HC03
- Website: Official website

History
- Opened: 1 October 1990

Services
Preceding station	Heisei Chikuhō Railway	Following station
Minami-Nōgata-Gotenguchi towards Nōgata	Ita Line	Fujitana towards Tagawa-Ita
Location
- Location within Fukuoka Prefecture Location within Japan

Akadi Station (あかぢ駅, Akadi-eki) is a passenger railway station located in the town of Kotake, Fukuoka Prefecture, Japan. It is operated by the third-sector railway operator Heisei Chikuhō Railway.

== Lines ==
Akaji Station is served by the Ita Line and is located 2.4 km from the starting point of the line at Nōgata.

== Layout ==
The station consists of two opposed unnumbered side platforms connected by a level crossing. There is no station building, but only a shelter on each platform. The station is unattended.

== Platforms ==
East (southbound)	■ ■ Ita Line	for Kanada, Tagawa-Ita, Tagawa-Gotōji, Yukuhashi
West (northbound)	■ ■ Ita Line	for Nōgata

== History ==
The station was opened on 1 October 1990 as Akaji Station (あかじ駅). The official transliteration of the station name was changed of Akadi Station (あかぢ駅) on 3 March 2001 due to the negative connotations of the word "akaji", which means "financial deficit".

== Surrounding area ==
The station is located on the right bank of the Onga River, near the northeastern tip of Kotake Town. There are fields around the station, and a small village to the southwest of the station.

- Japan National Route 200

== See also ==
- List of railway stations in Japan
