= Akaji =

Akaji can refer to the following:

- Akaji Station, railway station in Kotake, Fukuoka, Japan
- Akaji Maro, Japanese actor
- Bumpei Akaji, Hawaiian sculptor
