= Akaike Station =

Akaike Station (赤池駅) is the name of the following train stations in Japan:

- Akaike Station (Aichi)
- Akaike Station (Fukuoka)
- Akaike Station (Gifu)
