= Jōyama Cave Tomb Cluster =

Archaeological site in Japan

- 城山横穴群 (Japanese)
- Jōyama Cave Tomb Cluster Jōyama Cave Tomb Cluster (Japan)
- Interactive map of Jōyama Cave Tomb Cluster
- 33°40′43.88″N 130°46′47.87″E
- Type: Yokoanabo
- Periods: Kofun period
- Location: Fukuchi, Fukuoka, Japan
- Region: Kyushu

History
- Built: 6th to 7th century AD

Site notes
- Excavation dates: 2003-2013
- Public access: Yes

The Jōyama Cave Tomb Cluster (城山横穴群, Jōyama yokoana-gun) is a cluster of Kofun period yokoanabo located in the Town of Fukuchi, Fukuoka, Japan. was granted protection as a National Historic Site in 2014.

== Overview ==
The Jōyama Cave Tomb Cluster is located in the upper reaches of the Onga River basin, and is built on an independent hill at the confluence of the Hikoyama River and the Chumotoji River with an elevation of 29 to 31 meters. The site stretches approximately 360 meters from north-to-south and approximately 100 meters from east-to-west. In an archaeological excavation conducted by the Fukuchi Town Board of Education from 2003 to 2013, 222 yokoanabo, 12 mounds associated with corridor-type kofun and one corridor-type stone burial chamber tumulus were confirmed. Most of the tombs were found to be in good preservation, and a few contained human remains and shards of Sue ware pottery. There are only four examples of yokoanabo clusters with over 200 graves in Kyushu, and this group has the highest density. Yokoanabo first appeared in this area in the first half of the 6th century. The peak of construction was around the end of the 6th century to the beginning of the 7th century, and funerals continued until at least the latter half of the 7th century. Furthermore, from the early to mid-sixth century, burials were mainly built in the northern part of the hill, but from the latter half of the sixth century, when the number of tombs started to increase, yokoanabo expanded to the southern part of the hill.

Currently, the ruins have been backfilled for protection after being surveyed. The site is 700 meters southeast of Kanada Station on the Heisei Chikuhō Railway, or a seven-minute walk.

== See also ==
- List of Historic Sites of Japan (Fukuoka)
