= Fukuchi, Fukuoka =

Fukuchi 福智町
- Town
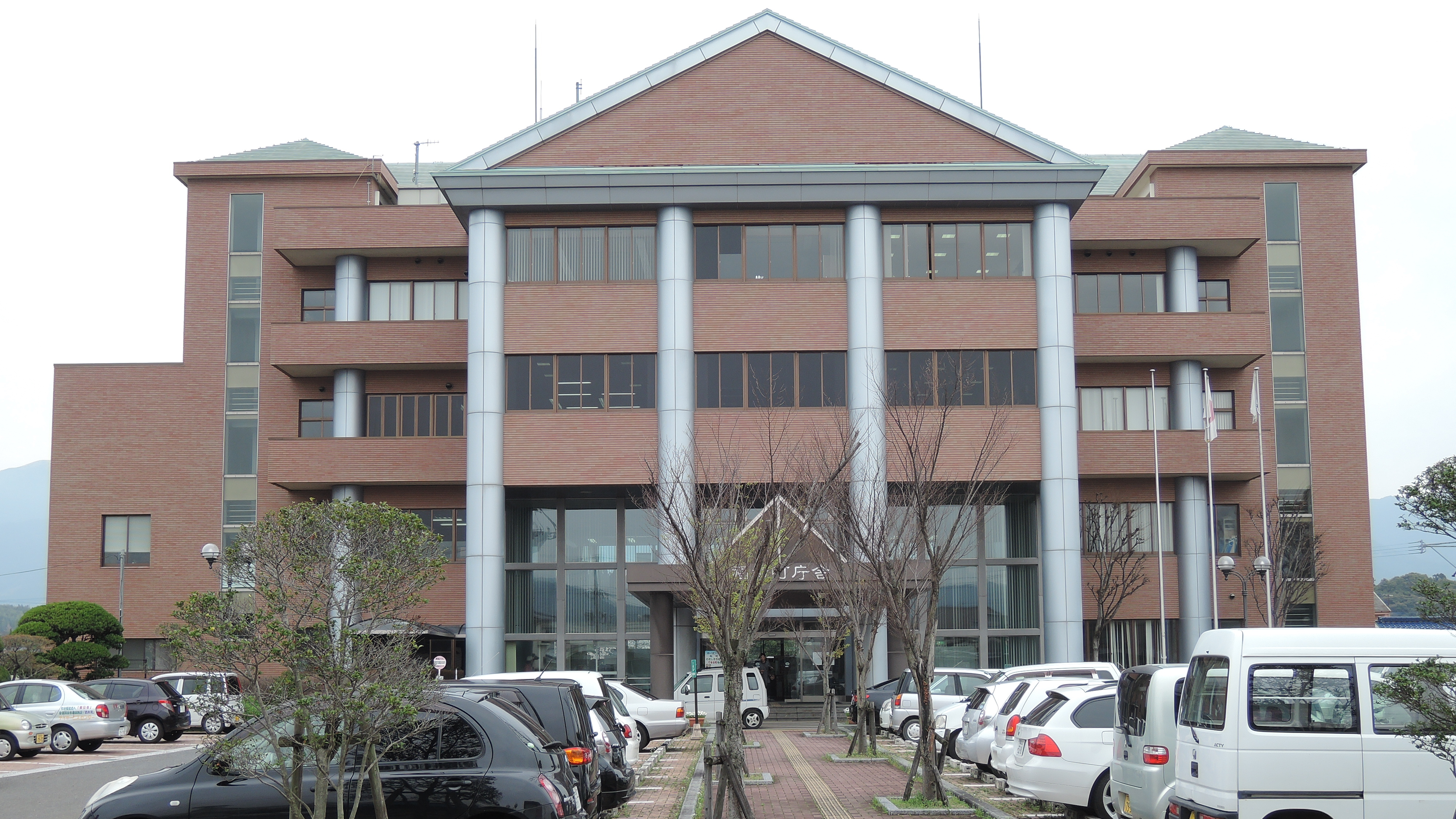
- Fukuchi town hall

- Flag Emblem
- Interactive map of Fukuchi
- Location in Japan
- Coordinates: 33°41′00″N 130°46′48″E
- Country: Japan
- Region: Kyushu
- Prefecture: Fukuoka
- District: Tagawa

Area
  - Total: 42.06 km^{2} (16.24 sq mi)

Population (January 1, 2024)
  - Total: 21,201
  - Density: 504.1/km^{2} (1,306/sq mi)
- Time zone: UTC+09:00 (JST)
- Website: Official website
- Symbols
- Bird: Japanese bush warbler
- Flower: Wisteria floribunda
- Tree: Sakura

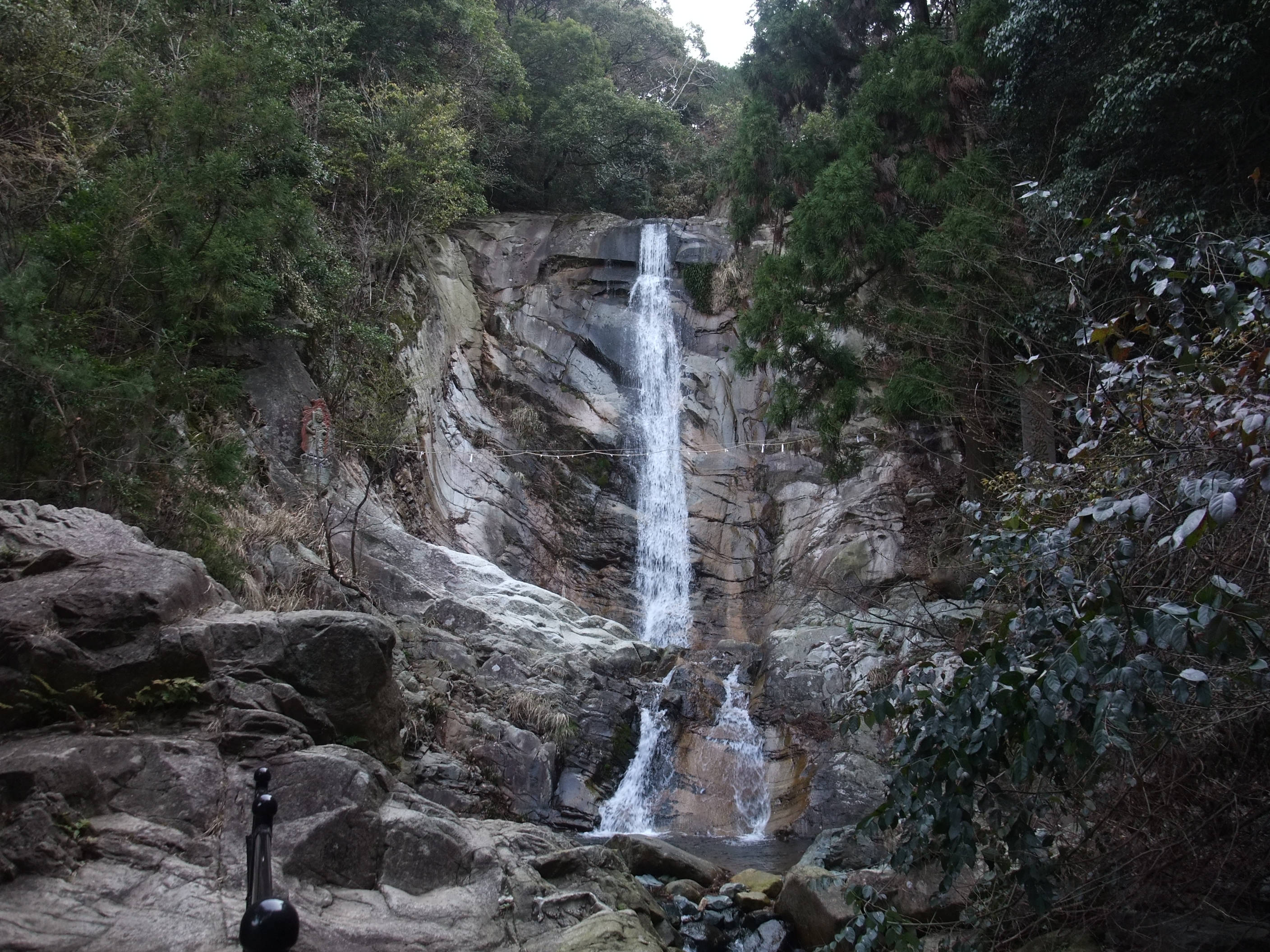
Shiraito Falls

Fukuchi (福智町, Fukuchi-machi) is a town in Tagawa District, Fukuoka Prefecture, Japan. As of 1 January 2024, the town had an estimated population of 21,201 people in 11,071 households, and a population density of 500 persons per km^{2}. The total area of the town is 42.06 km^{2} (16.24 sq mi).

== Geography ==
Fukuchi is located slightly northeast of central Fukuoka Prefecture, at the northeastern tip of the Chikuho region, approximately 45 kilometers east of Fukuoka City, and approximately 35 kilometers south of Kitakyushu City. Two rivers, the Hikoyama River and the Nakamotoji River, run through the town, and both rivers meet in the center of the town. The northeastern part of the town area is a mountainous area with mountains ranging in height from 600 to 700 meters, including Mount Fukuchi (901 m (2,956 ft)), and the rest of the area is at the northeastern end of the Chikuho Basin.

=== Neighboring municipalities ===
Fukuoka Prefecture

- Iizuka
- Itoda
- Kawara
- Kitakyushu
- Nōgata
- Tagawa

=== Climate ===
Fukuchi has a humid subtropical climate (Köppen Cfa) characterized by warm summers and cool winters with light to no snowfall. The average annual temperature in Fukuchi is 15.5 °C. The average annual rainfall is 1560 mm with September as the wettest month. The temperatures are highest on average in August, at around 26.7 °C, and lowest in January, at around 4.7 °C.

=== Demographics ===
Per Japanese census data, the population of Fukuchi is as shown below

Historical population
Year	Pop.	±%
1940	32,854	—
1950	41,460	+26.2%
1960	39,501	−4.7%
1970	24,935	−36.9%
1980	26,104	+4.7%
1990	27,041	+3.6%
2000	26,375	−2.5%
2010	24,714	−6.3%
2020	21,398	−13.4%

== History ==
The area of Fukuichi was part of ancient Buzen Province. During the Edo Period, the area was part of the holdings of Kokura Domain. The villages of Kanda, Hōjō and Ueno were established on May 1, 1889, with the creation of the modern municipalities system. Kanda was elevated to town status on July 28, 1916, and was renamed Kanada. Ueno was elevated to town status on November 3, 1939, and was renamed Akaike. Hōjō was raised to town status on August 1, 1956. the three municipalities merged on March 6, 2006, to form the town of Fukuchi.

== Government ==
Fukuichi has a mayor-council form of government with a directly elected mayor and a unicameral town council of 18 members. Fukuichi, collectively with the other municipalities of Tagawa District contributes two members to the Fukuoka Prefectural Assembly. In terms of national politics, the town is part of the Fukuoka 11th district of the lower house of the Diet of Japan.

== Economy ==
During the Meiji period, Fukuchi, along with the other municipalities of the Chikuho area, developed with the Kitakyushu industrial zone through coal mining, and is still considered part of to the Greater Kitakyushu Metropolitan Area. However, as the demand for coal decreased due to the energy revolution, the coal mines that had sponsored prosperity have all closed, leading to depopulation. The main economic activity is now agriculture.

== Education ==
Fukuchi has four public elementary high schools and one public junior high school operated by the town government. The town does not have a high school.

== Transportation ==
=== Railways ===
Heisei Chikuhō Railway - Ita Line

■ Ichiba - Fureai-Shōriki - Akaike - Hitomi - Kanada - Kami-Kanada

=== Highways ===
Fukuchi is not served by any Expressway or National Highway. The nearest interchange is the Yawata Interchange on the Kyushu Expressway.

== Local attractions ==
- Agano ware (上野焼 Agano-yaki), a type of pottery.
- Jōyama Cave Tomb Cluster, National Historic Site
