= Tagawa, Fukuoka =

Tagawa 田川市
- City
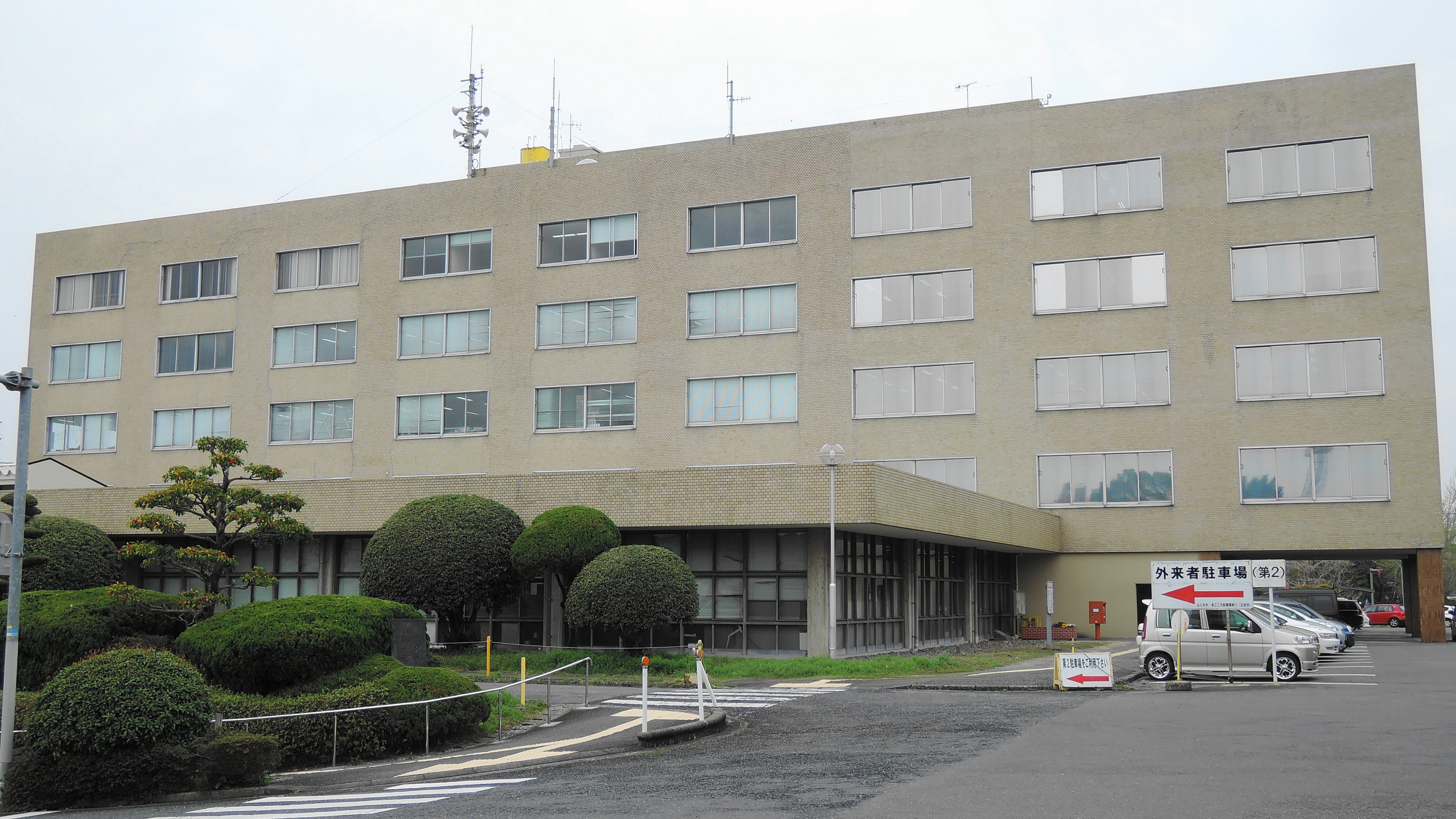
- Tagawa city hall

- Flag Seal
- Location of Tagawa in Fukuoka Prefecture

- Location in Japan
- Coordinates: 33°38′20″N 130°48′22″E
- Country: Japan
- Region: Kyushu
- Prefecture: Fukuoka

Government
  - Mayor: Takuya Murakami (since 2023)

Area
  - Total: 54.55 km^{2} (21.06 sq mi)

Population (January 1, 2024)
  - Total: 45,389
  - Density: 832.1/km^{2} (2,155/sq mi)
- Time zone: UTC+09:00 (JST)
- City hall address: 1-1 Chuo, Tagawa-shi, Fukuoka-ken 825-8501
- Symbols
- Flower: Azalea
- Tree: Ginkgo biloba, Osmanthus

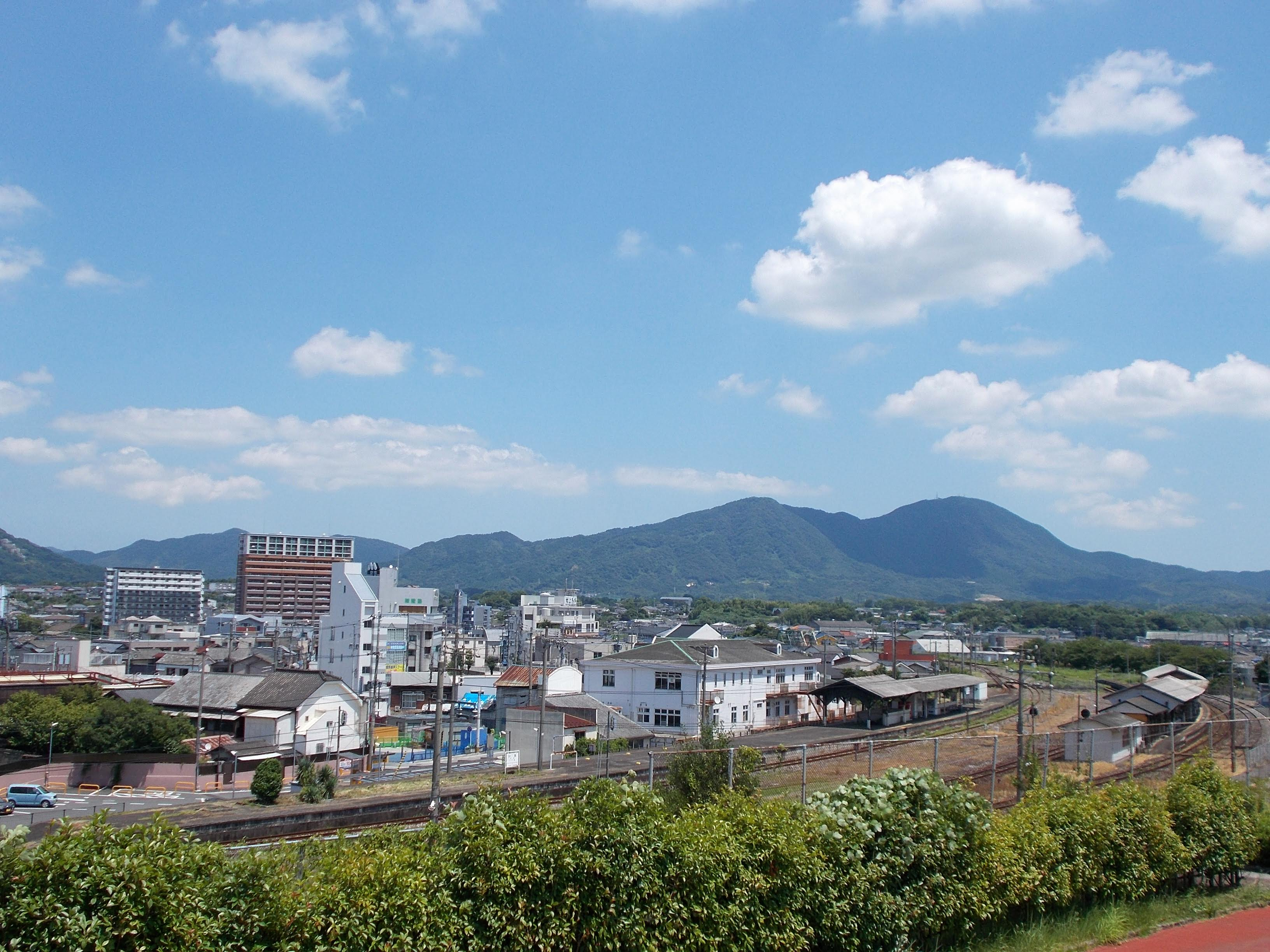
Views of Tagawa-Ita Station and Mount Iidake from Tagawa City Coal Mining Historical Park

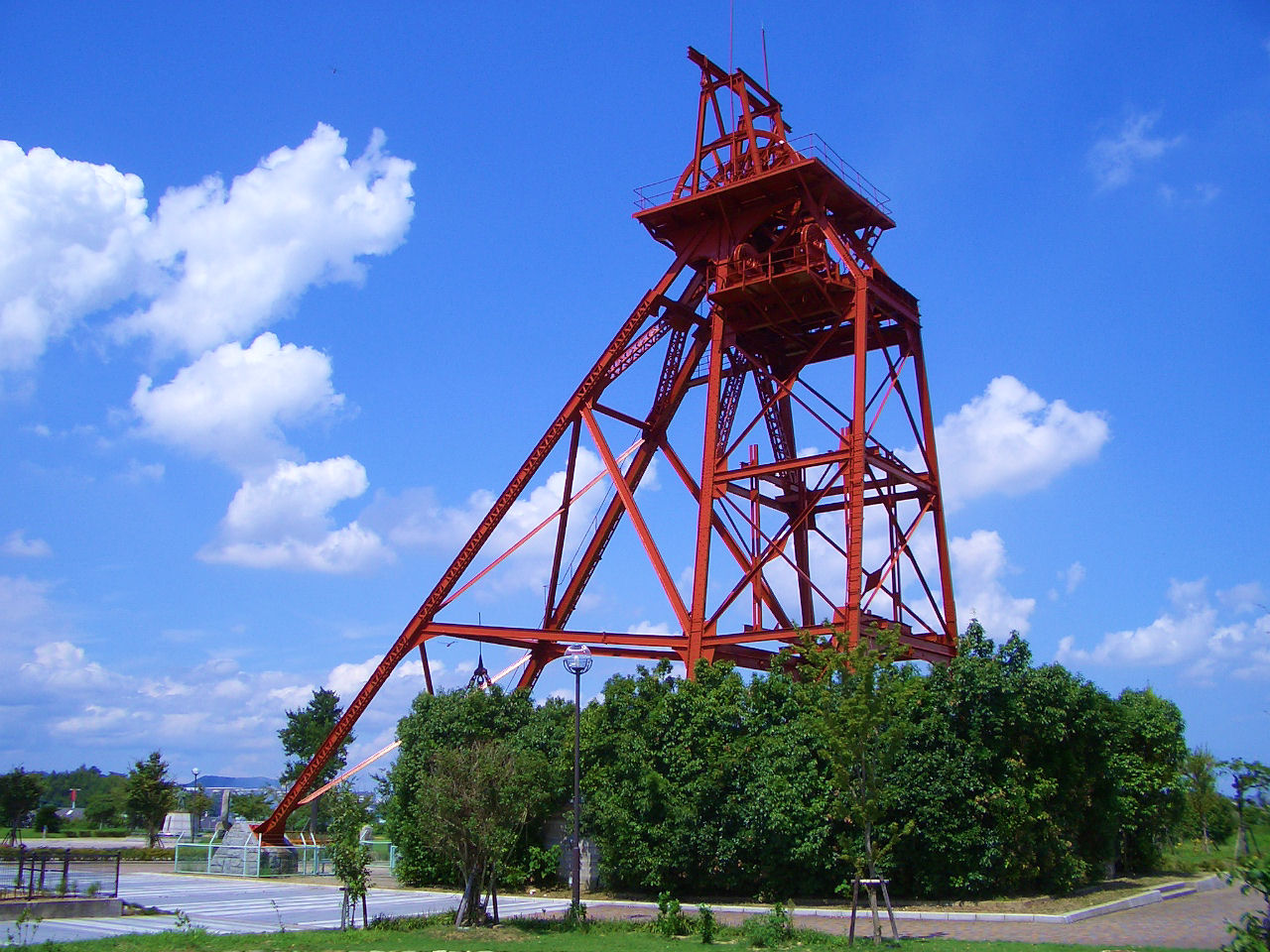
Site of Mitsui Tagawa Coal Mine

Tagawa (田川市, Tagawa-shi) is a city located in Fukuoka Prefecture, Japan. As of 1 January 2024, the city had an estimated population of 45,389 in 24248 households, and a population density of 830 persons per km^{2}. The total area of the city is 54.55 km^{2} (21.06 sq mi).

== Geography ==
Tagawa is located almost in the center of Fukuoka Prefecture, approximately 30 kilometer south-southwest of the center of Kitakyushu City, approximately 50 kilometers east-northeast of Fukuoka City, and approximately 20 kilometers west of Yukuhashi City. It is surrounded by mountains with Mount Kaharudake, which is the symbol of Tagawa, to the east, Mount Funao to the west, and Mount Hiko to the south. The Hikoyama River and Nakamotoji River, which originate from Mount Hiko, flow through the city.

=== Neighboring municipalities ===
Fukuoka Prefecture

- Fukuchi
- Iizuka
- Itoda
- Kama
- Kawara
- Kawasaki
- Ōtō

=== Climate ===
Tagawa has a humid subtropical climate (Köppen Cfa) characterized by warm summers and cool winters with light to no snowfall. The average annual temperature in Tagawa is 14.8 °C. The average annual rainfall is 1560 mm with September as the wettest month. The temperatures are highest on average in August, at around 26.1 °C, and lowest in January, at around 3.7 °C.

=== Demographics ===
Per Japanese census data, the population of Tagawa is as shown below

Historical population
Year	Pop.	±%
1950	94,616	—
1960	95,911	+1.4%
1970	64,233	−33.0%
1980	60,077	−6.5%
1990	57,700	−4.0%
2000	54,027	−6.4%
2010	50,601	−6.3%
2020	48,441	−4.3%

== History ==
The area of Tagawa was part of ancient Buzen Province. During the Edo Period the area was partly under the control of Kokura Domain. After the Meiji restoration, the villages of Ita and Yugeta were established on May 1, 1889, with the creation of the modern municipalities system. Yugeta was raised to town status on April 1, 1907, and was renamed Gotōji . Ita was raised to town status on January 1, 1914. The two towns merged on November 3, 1943, to form the city of Tagawa.

== Government ==
Tagawa has a mayor-council form of government with a directly elected mayor and a unicameral city council of 20 members. Tagawa contributes one member to the Fukuoka Prefectural Assembly. In terms of national politics, the city is part of the Fukuoka 11th district of the lower house of the Diet of Japan.

== Economy ==
During the Meiji period, Tagawa, along with the other municipalities of the Chikuho area, developed with the Kitakyushu industrial zone through coal mining, and is still considered part of to the Greater Kitakyushu Metropolitan Area. However, as the demand for coal decreased due to the energy revolution, the coal mines that had sponsored prosperity have closed, leading to depopulation. The city still has a large cement industry, and the site of the former coal mines has been developed into a tourist attraction and an industrial park, attracting glass bottle production, food processing (Tirol (チロル) miniature chocolates are manufactured in Tagawa.) and logistics distribution centers.

== Education ==
Tagawa has eight public elementary schools and two public junior high schools and one combined elementary/junior high school operated by the city government and three public high schools operated by the Fukuoka Prefectural Board of Education. There is also one private high school. The Fukuoka Prefectural University is located in Tagawa.

== Transportation ==
=== Railways ===
JR Kyushu - Hitahikosan Line

JI Tagawa-Ita - Tagawa-Gotōji

JR Kyushu - Gotōji Line

JJ Funao - Tagawa-Gotōji

Heisei Chikuhō Railway - Tagawa Line / Ita Line

■ / ■ Hoshii - Tagawa Municipal Hospital - Shimoita - Tagawa-Ita

Heisei Chikuhō Railway - Itoda Line

■ Ōyabu

  - Coto Coto Train tourist train

=== Highways ===
- Kyushu Expressway
- Higashikyushu Expressway
- National Route 201
- National Route 322

== Local attractions ==
- Tagawa City Coal Mining Historical Museum

== Notable people from Tagawa ==
- Kenichi Ogata, voice actor
