= Shinnyū Station =

Railway station in Nōgata, Fukuoka Prefecture, Japan

JC 20 Shinnyū Station 新入駅
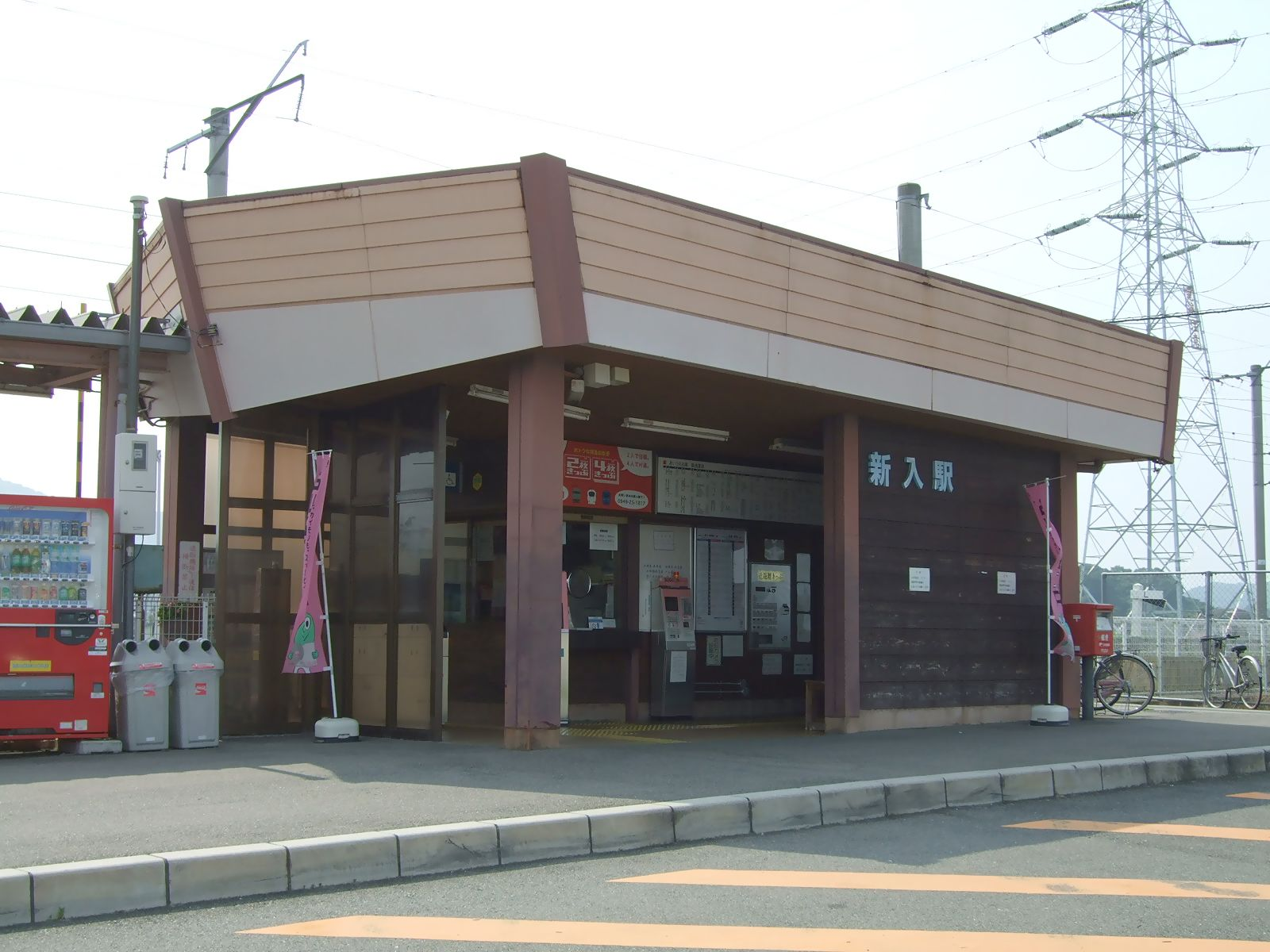
- Shinnyū Station in 2009

General information
- Location: Shimoshinnyu, Nōgata-shi, Fukuoka- 822-0032; Japan
- Coordinates: 33°45′51″N 130°42′49″E
- Operator: JR Kyushu
- Line: JC Chikuhō Main Line
- Distance: 22.8 km from Wakamatsu
- Platforms: 2 side platforms
- Tracks: 2

Construction
- Structure type: At grade
- Parking: Available
- Accessible: No - steps to platform

Other information
- Status: Remotely managed station
- Website: Official website

History
- Opened: 11 March 1989

Passengers
- FY2020: 285 daily
- Rank: 282nd (among JR Kyushu stations)

Services
Preceding station	JR Kyushu	Following station
Nōgata towards Haruda	Chikuhō Main Line Local	Chikuzen-Ueki towards Wakamatsu
Location
- Location within Fukuoka Prefecture Location within Japan

Shinnyū Station (新入駅, Shinnyū-eki) is a passenger railway station located in the city of Nōgata, Fukuoka Prefecture, Japan. It is operated by JR Kyushu.

== Lines ==
The station is served by the Chikuhō Main Line and is located 22.8 km from the starting point of the line at Wakamatsu.

== Station layout ==
The station consists of two opposed side platforms serving two tracks. A station building, of modern design and shaped to resemble a traditional coal-ferrying boat, houses a waiting room and automatic ticket vending machines. Access to the opposite side platform is by means of a level crossing with steps at both ends.

=== Platforms ===
1	■ JC Chikuhō Main Line	for Nōgata, Shin-Iizuka
2	■ JC Chikuhō Main Line	for Orio, Wakamatsu

== History ==
The station was opened by JR Kyushu on 11 March 1989 as an additional station on the existing Chikuhō Main Line track.

On 4 March 2017, Shinnyū, along with several other stations on the line, became a remotely managed "Smart Support Station". Under this scheme, although the station is unstaffed, passengers using the automatic ticket vending machines or ticket gates can receive assistance via intercom from staff at a central support centre which is located at Nakama.

== Passenger statistics ==
In fiscal 2020, the station was used by a daily average of 285 boarding passengers, making it the 282nd busiest station on the JR Kyushu network.。

== Surrounding area ==
- Fukuoka Prefectural Route 27 Nogata Ashiya Line
- Nogata City Nogata Third Junior High School

== See also ==
- List of railway stations in Japan
