= Nōgata =

Nōgata 直方市
- City
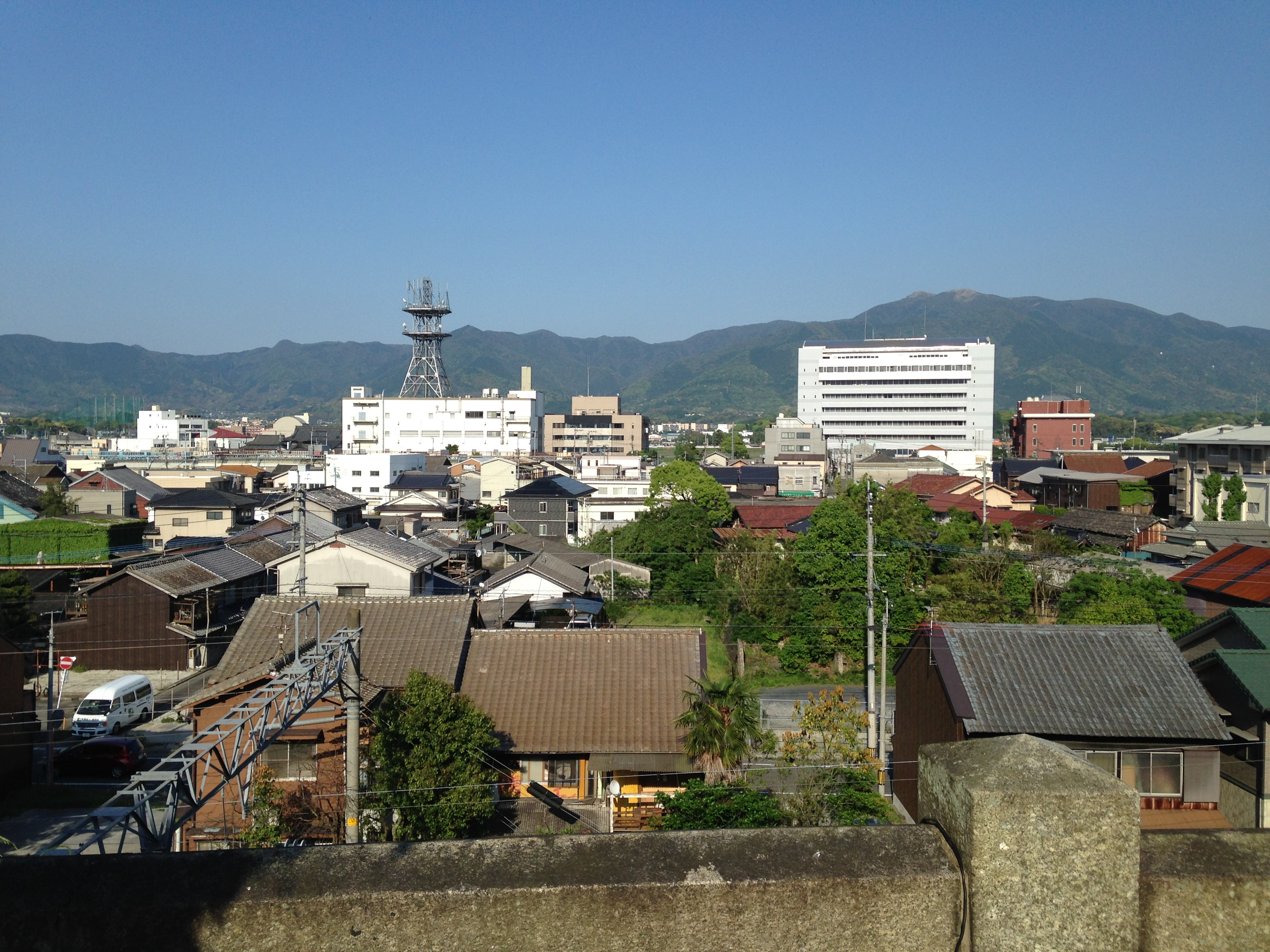
- View of Nōgata, from Taga Shrine

- Flag Seal
- /0/queryThe property query is required; /0/idsThe property ids is required; /0Failed to match at least one schema; /0/titleThe property title is required; /0/serviceDoes not have a value in the enumeration ["page"]; /0Failed to match exactly one schema; /0/geometriesThe property geometries is required; /0/typeDoes not have a value in the enumeration ["GeometryCollection"]; /0/typeDoes not have a value in the enumeration ["MultiPolygon"]; /0/typeDoes not have a value in the enumeration ["Point"]; /0/typeDoes not have a value in the enumeration ["MultiPoint"]; /0/typeDoes not have a value in the enumeration ["LineString"]; /0/typeDoes not have a value in the enumeration ["MultiLineString"]; /0/typeDoes not have a value in the enumeration ["Polygon"]; /0/coordinatesThe property coordinates is required; /0/geometryThe property geometry is required; /0/typeDoes not have a value in the enumeration ["Feature"]; /0/featuresThe property features is required; /0/typeDoes not have a value in the enumeration ["FeatureCollection"]; Location of Nōgata in Fukuoka Prefecture

- Location in Japan
- Coordinates: 33°44′39″N 130°43′47″E
- Country: Japan
- Region: Kyushu
- Prefecture: Fukuoka

Government
  - Mayor: Toshiaki Kono (since April 2003)

Area
  - Total: 61.76 km^{2} (23.85 sq mi)

Population (February 29, 2024)
  - Total: 55,151
  - Density: 893.0/km^{2} (2,313/sq mi)
- Time zone: UTC+09:00 (JST)
- City hall address: 7-1 Tonomachi, Nogata-shi, Fukuoka-ken 822-0017
- Website: Official website
- Symbols
- Flower: Tulipa, Lilium, Cosmos, Narcissus
- Tree: Magnolia grandiflora, Cornus kousa

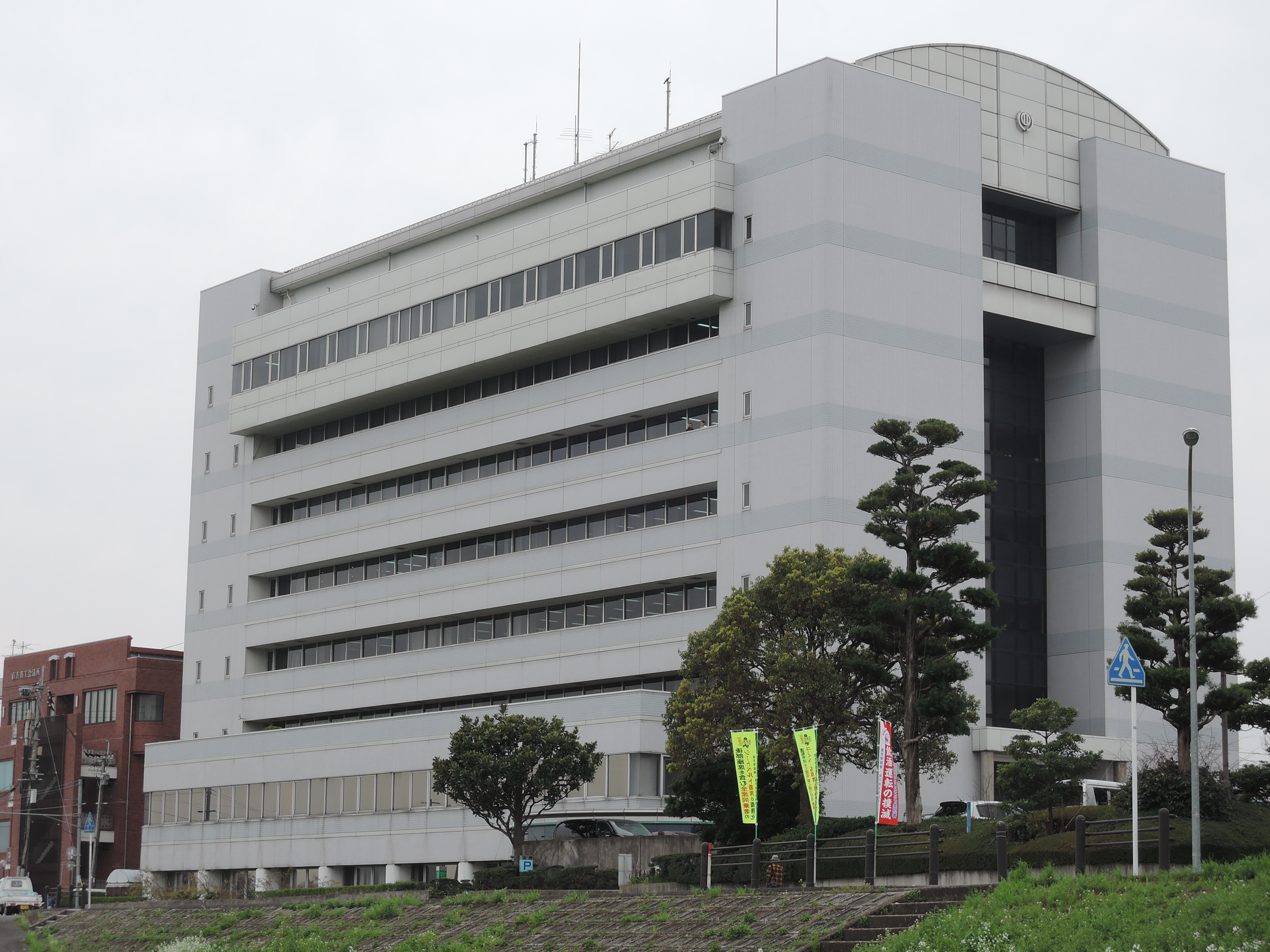
Nōgata City hall

Nōgata (直方市, Nōgata-shi) is a city located in Fukuoka Prefecture, Japan. As of 29 February 2024, the city had an estimated population of 55,151 in 27,684 households, and a population density of 890 persons per km^{2}. The total area of the city is 61.76 km^{2} (23.85 sq mi).

== Geography ==
Nōgata is located in the northern part of Fukuoka Prefecture, at the northern tip of the Chikuhō region. It is located approximately 30 km southwest of the center of Kitakyūshū City and approximately 50 km northeast of Fukuoka City. The center of the city is a plain, located almost in the center of the Chikuhō Plain, and the Onga River, which combines the Hikoyama River and the Inunaki River, flows through it. The urban area is centered on the area sandwiched between the Onga River and the JR Kyushu Chikuhō Main Line (Fukuhoku Yutaka Line). The eastern and western regions are residential areas, the southern area is an industrial area, and the northern area is a rural area. In the eastern part of the city, the Fukuchi Mountains run north-south, and have an average elevation of 600 meters, including Mt. Takatori and Mt. Shakudake, centered on the main peak, Mt. Fukuchi (900.8 meters).

=== Neighboring municipalities ===
Fukuoka Prefecture

- Fukuchi
- Iizuka
- Kitakyūshū
- Kotake
- Kurate
- Miyawaka

=== Climate ===
Nōgata has a humid subtropical climate (Köppen Cfa) characterized by warm summers and cool winters with light to no snowfall. The average annual temperature in Nōgata is 15.4 °C. The average annual rainfall is 1560 mm with September as the wettest month. The temperatures are highest on average in August, at around 26.7 °C, and lowest in January, at around 4.7 °C.

=== Demographics ===
Per Japanese census data, the population of Nōgata is as shown below

Historical population
| Year | Pop. | ±% |
|---|---|---|
| 1940 | 51,209 | — |
| 1950 | 58,900 | +15.0% |
| 1960 | 62,179 | +5.6% |
| 1970 | 55,615 | −10.6% |
| 1980 | 62,595 | +12.6% |
| 1990 | 62,530 | −0.1% |
| 2000 | 59,182 | −5.4% |
| 2010 | 57,700 | −2.5% |
| 2020 | 56,238 | −2.5% |

== History ==
The area of Nōgata was part of ancient Chikuzen Province. The oldest recorded meteorite fall occurred at Nōgata on May 19 in the year of 861. (ja:直方隕石) In the Nara period, a settlement developed around the Shingon temple of Toren-ji. The temple was destroyed in the Muromachi period and was replaced by a castle occupied by Prince Kaneyoshi during the wars of the Nanboku-chō period. During the Edo Period, it was part of the holdings of Fukuoka Domain under the Kuroda clan. From 1675 to 1677 and again from 1688 to 1720, it was the site of Nōgata Domain, a sub-domain of Fukuoka Domain. Although the domain was subsumed back into Fukuoka Domain due to lack of succession, the merchants of Nōgata succeeded in re-routing the Nagasaki kaidō highway through what is now the city center. After the Meiji restoration, the villages of Fukuchi, Shimosakai, Tonno, Niiri, and Ueki were established on May 1, 1889, with the creation of the modern municipalities system. Ueki was raised to town status on March 14, 1900. On November 1, 1926, Fukuchi, Shimosakai, Tonno, and Shiniri merged to form the town of Nōgata. Nōgata was raised to city status on January 1, 1931, and absorbed the town of Ueki on March 31, 1955.

== Government ==
Nōgata has a mayor-council form of government with a directly elected mayor and a unicameral city council of 19 members. Nōgata contributes one member to the Fukuoka Prefectural Assembly. In terms of national politics, the city is part of the Fukuoka 8th district of the lower house of the Diet of Japan.

== Economy ==
During the Meiji period, Nōgata, along with the other municipalities of the Chikuhō area, developed with the Kitakyushu industrial zone through coal mining, and is still considered part of to the Greater Kitakyushu Metropolitan Area. However, as the demand for coal decreased due to the energy revolution, the coal mines that had sponsored prosperity have all closed, leading to depopulation. The economic activity of the town is now a mixture of commerce and light manufacturing. Due to its proximity to Kitakyūshū, it is increasing becoming a commuter town.

== Education ==
Nōgata has eleven public elementary schools and four public junior high schools operated by the city government and three public high schools operated by the Fukuoka Prefectural Board of Education. There is also one private high school and the prefecture also operates one special education school for the handicapped.

== Transportation ==
=== Railways ===
JR Kyushu - Chikuhō Main Line

JC - Nōgata - Shinnyū - Chikuzen-Ueki

Chikuhō Electric Railroad Line

■ Ongano - Ganda -Chikuhō-Nōgata

Heisei Chikuhō Railway - Ita Line

■ Nōgata - Minami-Nōgata-Gotenguchi - <Akaji> - Fujitana - Nakaizumi

=== Highways ===
- National Route 200
- National Route 210

== Local attractions ==
=== Nōgata Coal Memorial Museum ===
Nōgata's Coal Memorial Museum provides visitors with the history of coal mines in the area. Its exhibits include a steam locomotive, the machines for digging and extracting coal, coal miners' clothes, and other memorabilia. Closed Mondays. It is next to Taga Park.

=== Ongagawa Riverside Park ===
In spring, it features blooms of yellow flowers, and in April, a colorful Tulip Festival is held. About 200,000 people visit the festival for the period. The park is also a site where a fireworks show is held each year.

== Noted people from Nōgata ==
- Kaiō Hiroyuki, sumo wrestler
- Kenji Yonekura, professional boxer
