= Fukuoka Prefectural University =

Higher education institution in Fukuoka Prefecture, Japan

Coordinates: 33°38′56″N 130°48′55″E

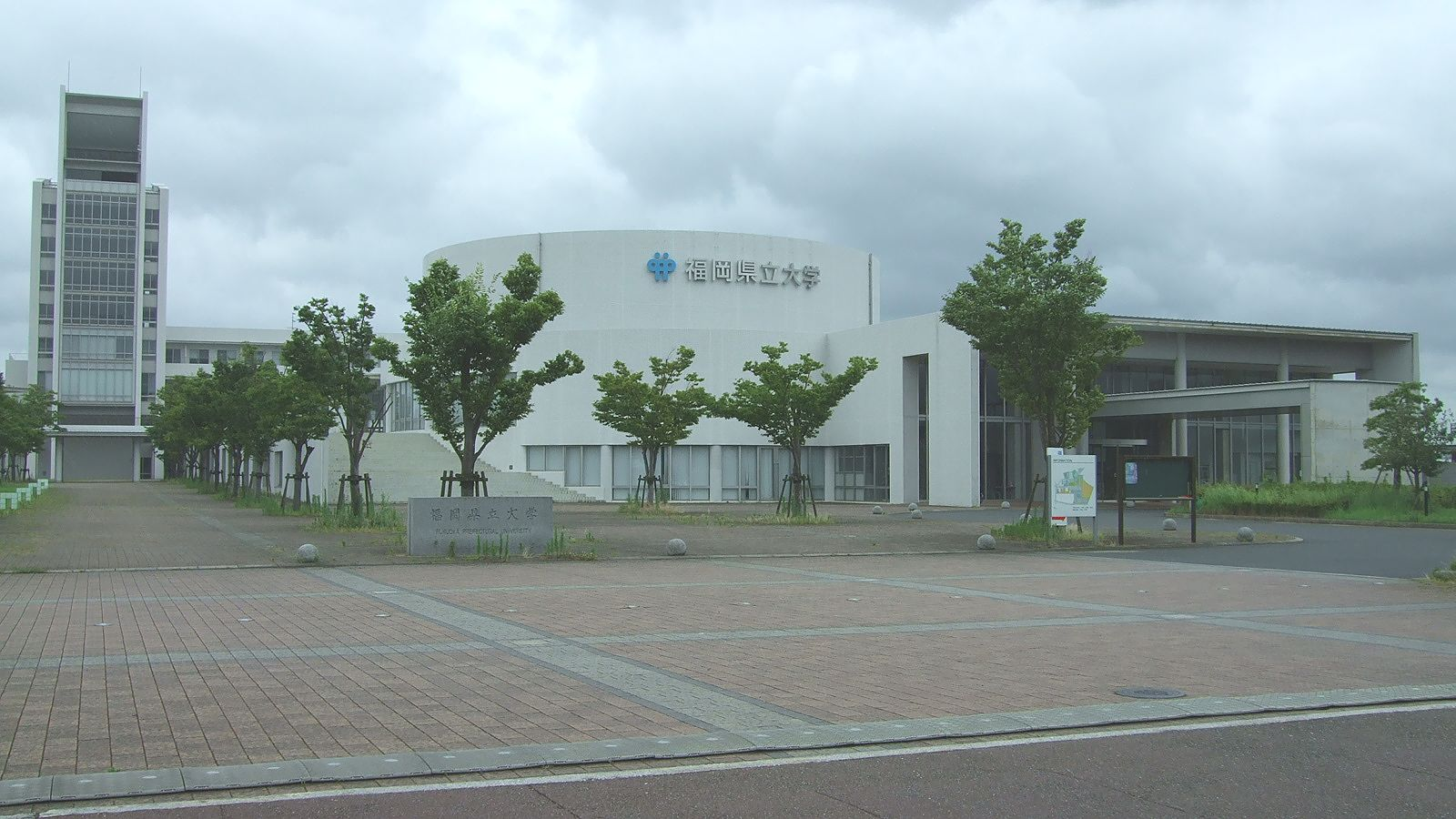
Fukuoka Prefectural University campus

Fukuoka Prefectural University (福岡県立大学, Fukuoka Kenritsu Daigaku) is a public university in Tagawa, Fukuoka, Japan, established in 1992.
