= Ita Line =

Railway line in Fukuoka Prefecture, Japan

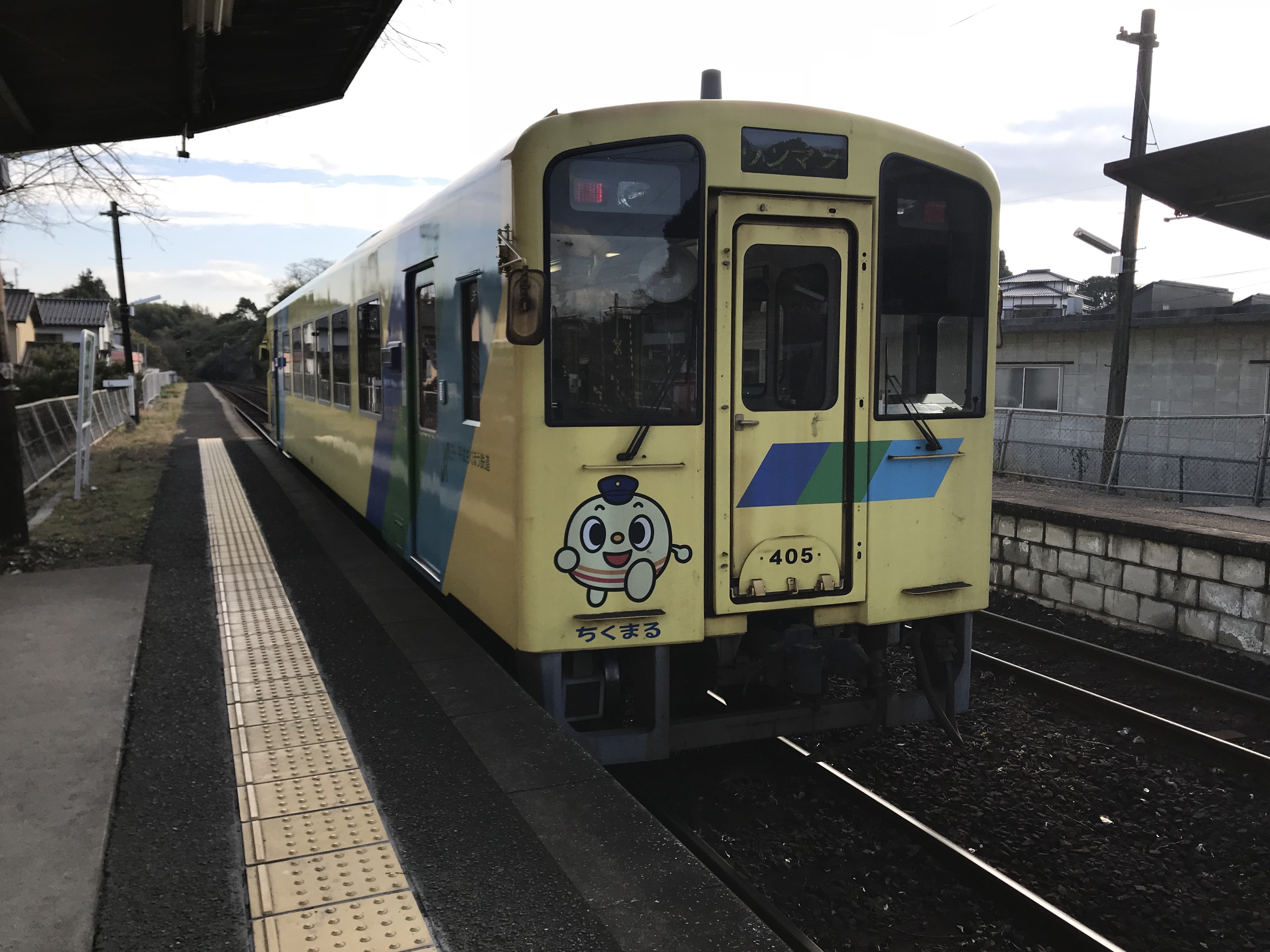
- A Heisei Chikuhō train at Akaike Station

Overview
- Native name: 伊田線
- Owner: Heisei Chikuhō Railway
- Locale: Fukuoka Prefecture
- Termini: Nōgata; Tagawa-Ita
- Stations: 15
- Website: www.heichiku.net

Service
- Type: Heavy rail

History
- Work began: 11 February 1893
- Completed: 25 March 1899; 127 years ago
- Privatized: 1 October 1989

Technical
- Line length: 16.1 km (10.0 mi)
- Track gauge: 1,067 mm (3 ft 6 in)
- Electrification: None
Route map

The Ita Line (伊田線, Ita-sen) is a 16.1 km railway line owned by the third-sector company Heisei Chikuhō Railway. The line runs north from Tagawa to Nōgata, all within Fukuoka Prefecture.

== History ==
The line was first built by the Chikuhō Kōgyō Railway, later renamed Chikuhō Railway (筑豊鉄道), as a branch line of the Chikuhō Main Line. Used to transport coal from the Chikuhō coal mine, the line had two stations: Nōgata Station and Kanada Station. The entire Chikuhō Railway system was merged in 1897 with Kyushu Railway, where the line was extended to Ita Station (now Tagawa-Ita Station) in 1899. Kyushu Railway was nationalized in 1907 and was merged into Japanese Government Railway.

Even though the Ita Line was widened to a double-track railway in 1911, ridership suffered with the decline of the Chikuhō coal mine. Therefore, JR Kyushu, the successor of Japanese Government Railway, privatized and transferred the Ita Line, Itoda Line, and Tagawa Line to the newly founded Heisei Chikuhō Railway.

Even after privatization, the Japan Freight Railway Company still ran trains from Kanada north to Mojiko Station in Kitakyushu, transporting cement from a Mitsui Tankō plant near Kanada Station. This service ceased with the plant's closure in March 2004.

== Operations ==
The line is not electrified and is double-tracked for the entire line. Some services continue past Kanada Station on the Itoda Line to Tagawa-Gotōji Station.

== Stations ==
All stations are within Fukuoka Prefecture.

No.	Name		Distance (km)	Connections	Location
HC1	Nōgata	直方	0.0	JR Kyushu: JC Chikuhō Main Line (Fukuhoku Yutaka Line)	Nōgata
HC2	Minami-Nōgata-Gotenguchi	南直方御殿口	1.1		Nōgata
HC3	Akaji	あかぢ	2.4		Kotake
HC4	Fujitana	藤棚	3.6		Nōgata
HC5	Nakaizumi	中泉	4.3		Nōgata
HC6	Ichiba	市場	6.5		Fukuchi
HC7	Fureai-Shōriki	ふれあい生力	7.6		Fukuchi
HC8	Akaike	赤池	8.5		Fukuchi
HC9	Hitomi	人見	9.1		Fukuchi
HC10	Kanada	金田	9.8	■ Itoda Line	Fukuchi
HC11	Kami-Kanada	上金田	11.6		Fukuchi
HC12	Hoshii	糒	12.8		Tagawa
HC13	Tagawa Municipal Hospital	田川市立病院	13.4		Tagawa
HC14	Shimoita	下伊田	14.5		Tagawa
HC15	Tagawa-Ita	田川伊田	16.1	■ Tagawa Line; JR Kyushu: JI Hitahikosan Line	Tagawa
