= Kanada Station =

Railway station in Fukuchi, Fukuoka Prefecture, Japan

Kanada Station 金田駅
- Station entrance

General information
- Other names: Fujiyunosato・Hinōnoyu-Onsen Kanada Station
- Location: Kanada, Fukuchi-cho, Tagawa-gun, Fukuoka 822-1201; Japan
- Coordinates: 33.6829°N 130.7766°E
- Operator: Heisei Chikuhō Railway
- Lines: ■ Ita Line ■ Itoda Line
- Distance: 9.8 km (from Nōgata Station); 0.0 km (from Kanada Station)
- Platforms: 1 side + 1 island platform

Construction
- Structure type: At-grade

Other information
- Status: Staffed
- Station code: HC10
- Website: Official website

History
- Opened: 11 February 1893

Passengers
- FY2019: 264

Services
Preceding station	Heisei Chikuhō Railway	Following station
Hitomi towards Nōgata	Ita Line	Kami-Kanada towards Tagawa-Ita
Terminus	Itoda Line	Buzen-Ōkuma towards Tagawa-Gotōji
Location
- Location within Fukuoka Prefecture Location within Japan

Kanada Station (金田駅, Kanada-eki) is a passenger railway station located in the town of Fukuchi, Fukuoka Prefecture, Japan. It is operated by the third-sector railway operator Heisei Chikuhō Railway. On 1 April 2009, two local onsen operators, Fujiyunosato and Hinōnoyu-Onsen, acquired naming rights to the station. Therefore, the station is alternatively known as Fujiyunosato・Hinōnoyu-Onsen Kanada Station (ふじ湯の里・日王の湯温泉金田駅, Fujiyunosato-Hinōnoyu-Onsen-Kanada-eki).

== Lines ==
Kanada Station is served by the Ita Line and is located 9.8 km from the starting point of the line at Nōgata. It is also a terminus for the Itoda Line and is 6.8 kilometers from the opposing terminus at Tagawa-Gotōji. Trains arrive roughly every hour.

== Layout ==
The station consists of one side platform and one island platform with a cutout to allow the island platform to serve three tracks. The platforms are connected by both an underground passage and a footbridge. The station building itself is wheelchair accessible and connected to Platform 1 by a slope, however, the island platform with Platforms 2-4 has no elevator and can be accessed only by stairs. The station is staffed and contains the head office of the Heisei Chikuhō Railway.

=== Platforms ===
1	■ ■ Ita Line	for Tagawa-Ita, Yukuhashi
2	■ ■ Itoda Line	for Tagawa-Gotōji
3	■ ■ Itoda Line	siding
4	■ ■ Itoda Line	for Tagawa-Gotōji starting trains only

== History ==
The station opened on 11 February 1893 as a station on the Kyushu Railway. The railway was nationalized on 1 July 1907. The Kinnomiya Railway (currently Itoda Line) opened on 1 February 1929 and was transferred to Kyushu Industrial Railway on 1 June of the same year. The Kyushu Industrial Railway was renamed Industrial Cement Railway in 1933 and was nationalized on 1 July 1943. With the privatization of the JNR on 1 April 1987, the station became part of JR Kyushu. It was transferred to the Heisei Chikuhō Railway on 1 October 1989.

== Surrounding area ==
- Fukuchi Town Hall Main Office
- Fukuchi Town Kaneda Compulsory Education School

== See also ==
- List of railway stations in Japan
