= Nōgata Station =

Railway station in Nōgata, Fukuoka Prefecture, Japan

JC 19 Nōgata Station 直方駅
- Nōgata Station in 2025

General information
- Location: 226-2 Yamabe, Nōgata-shi, Fukuoka-ken 822-0034; Japan
- Coordinates: 33°44′56″N 130°43′29″E
- Operator: JR Kyushu Heisei Chikuhō Railway
- Lines: JC Chikuhō Main Line; ■ Ita Line
- Distance: 24.8 km from Wakamatsu (Chikuhō Main Line); 0.0 km (starting point of the Ita Line)
- Platforms: 2 island + 2 bay platforms
- Tracks: 6 + numerous passing loops and sidings

Construction
- Structure type: At grade
- Parking: Available

Other information
- Status: Staffed ticket window (Midori no Madoguchi)
- Station code: JC19, HC1
- Website: Official website

History
- Opened: 30 August 1891

Passengers
- FY2020: 2487 daily
- Rank: 57th (among JR Kyushu stations)

Services
Preceding station	JR Kyushu	Following station
Katsuno towards Haruda	Chikuhō Main Line Local	Shinnyū towards Wakamatsu
Preceding station	Heisei Chikuhō Railway	Following station
Terminus	Ita Line	Minami-Nōgata-Gotenguchi towards Tagawa-Ita
Location
- Location within Fukuoka Prefecture Location within Japan

Nōgata Station (直方駅, Nōgata-eki) is a junction passenger railway station located in the city of Nōgata, Fukuoka Prefecture, Japan. It is operated jointly by JR Kyushu and by the third-sector railway operator Heisei Chikuhō Railway. Regarding the Heisei Chikuho Railway portion of the station, on April 1, 2009, Fujimoto Kogyo, a railway vehicle parts sales and graphics company headquartered in Kitakyushu, acquired the naming rights, and the station was called Fujimoto Kogyo StudioCanada Nogata Station (藤本興業 studiocanada 直方駅). As of September 2022, the contract has ended and it has returned to Nogata Station.

== Lines ==
The station is served by the Fukuhoku Yutaka Line portion of the Chikuhō Main Line and is located 24.8 km from the starting point of the line at Wakamatsu. In addition, the station is the northern terminus and starting point of the Heisei Chikuho Railway Ita Line.

== Station layout ==
The JR part of the station consists of two island platforms serving four tracks. Passing loops run between the platform tracks. In addition, numerous sidings branch off the main tracks. To the west of the station, there are more sidings that belong to the JR Kyushu Nōgata train depot. The station has a Midori no Madoguchi staffed ticket office. The Heisei Chikuho Railway part of the station comprises two bay platforms serving two tracks.

=== Platforms ===
1, 2	■ JC Chikuhō Main Line	for Keisen, Chōjabaru, Hakata
3, 4	■ JC Chikuhō Main Line	for Orio, Kurosaki, Wakamatsu
1, 2	■ ■ Ita Line	for Kanada, Tagawa-Gotōji, Yukuhashi

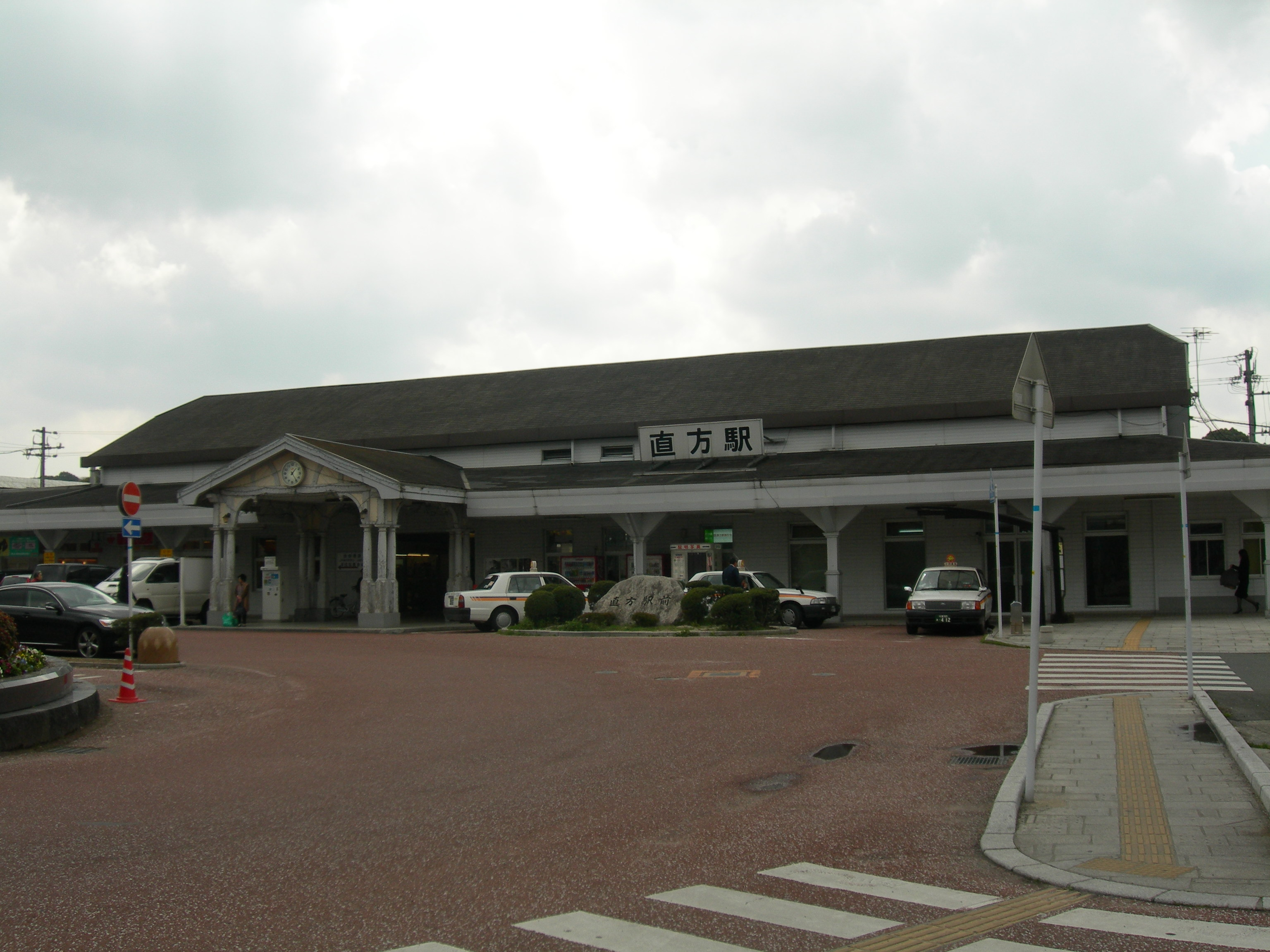
The former station building, since demolished.

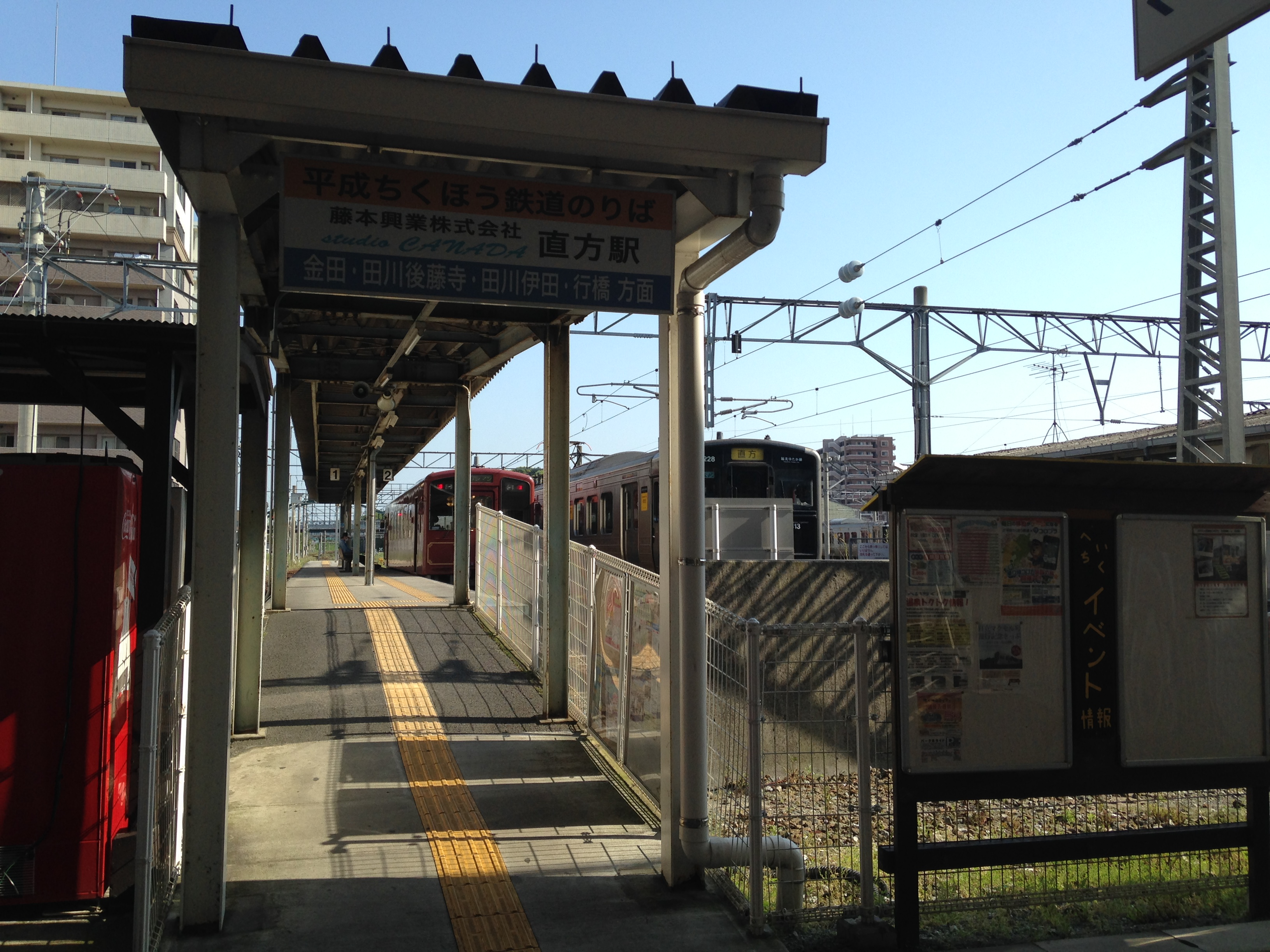
The entrance to the Heisei Chikuho Railway platforms in Nōgata Station.

== History ==
The station was opened on 30 August 1891 by the privately run Chikuho Kogyo Railway as the southern terminus of a stretch of track which it had laid from Wakamatsu. It became a through-station on 28 October 1892 when the track was further extended south to Kotake. On 11 February 1893, a new stretch of track was laid from the station to Kanada. On 1 October 1897, the Chikuho Kogyo Railway, now renamed the Chikuho Railway, merged with the Kyushu Railway. After the Kyushu Railway was nationalized on 1 July 1907, Japanese Government Railways (JGR) took over control of the station. On 12 October 1909, the track from Wakamatsu became the Chikuho Main Line while the track to Kanada became the Ita Line. With the privatization of Japanese National Railways (JNR), the successor of JGR, on 1 April 1987, control of the station passed to JR Kyushu. On 1 October 1989, Heisei Chikuho Railway assumed control of the Ita Line.

== Passenger statistics ==
In fiscal 2020, the JR station was used by a daily average of 2487 boarding passengers, making it the 59th busiest station on the JR Kyushu network. During the same period, the Heisei Chikuho Railway portion of the station was used by 587 passengers.

== Surrounding area ==
- Nogata City Hall

Fukuoka Prefecture Nogata General Government Building/Civil Engineering Office

- Nogata City Coal Memorial Hall (about 15 minutes walk to the south)
- Nogata Tanio Art Museum
- Fukuoka Prefectural Kurate High School
- Fukuoka Prefectural Nogata High School

== See also ==
- List of railway stations in Japan
