= Tagawa-Ita Station =

Railway station in Tagawa, Fukuoka Prefecture, Japan

JI 13 Tagawa-Ita Station 田川伊田駅
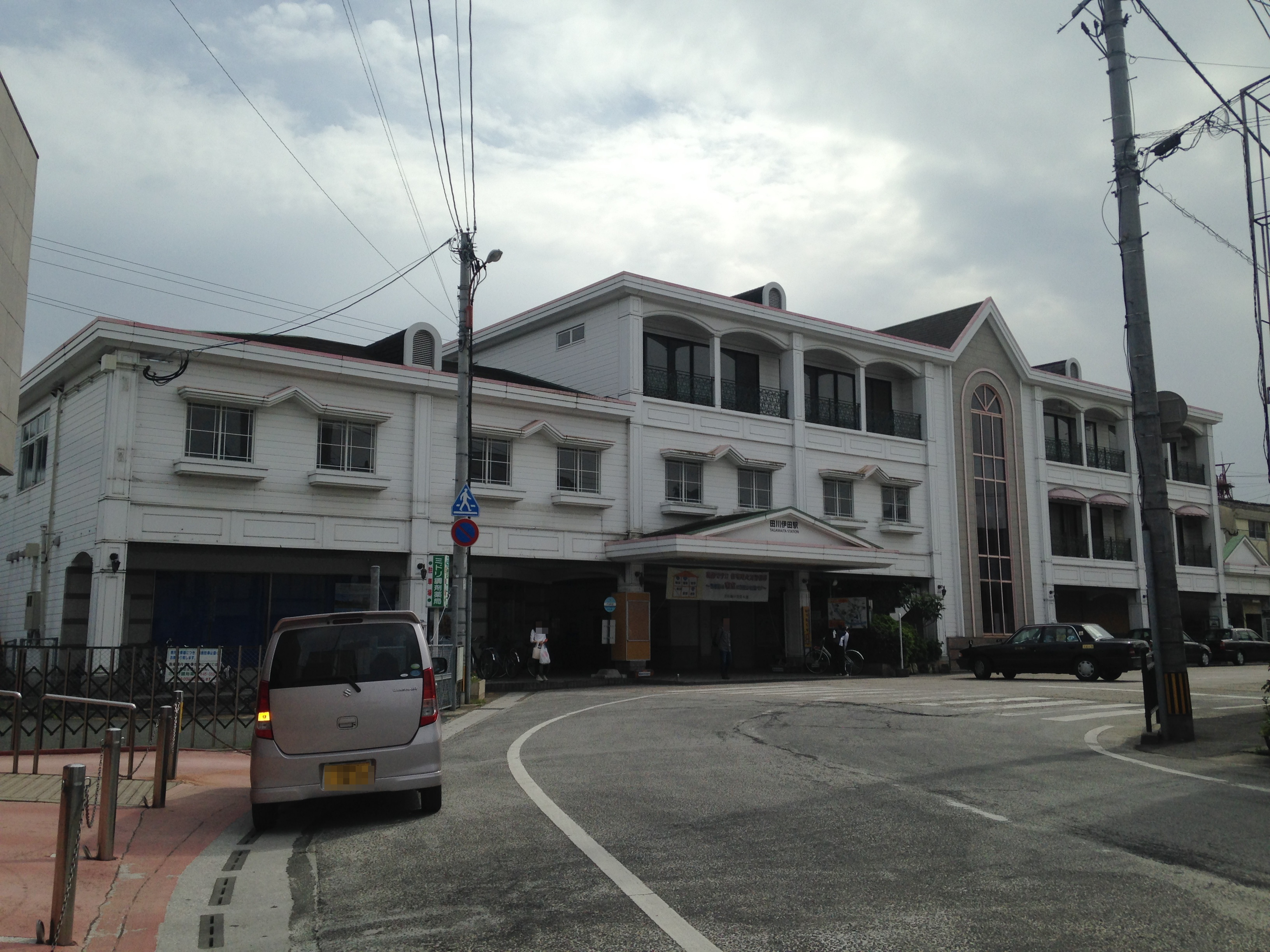
- Tagawa-Ita Station in May 2016

General information
- Other names: MrMax Tagawa-Ita Station
- Location: 2621-1 Ita, Tagawa-shi, Fukuoka-ken 825-0002; Japan
- Coordinates: 33°38′33″N 130°49′03″E
- Operator: JR Kyushu Heisei Chikuhō Railway
- Line: JI Hitahikosan Line ■ Ita Line ■ Tagawa Line
- Distance: 27.4 km from Jōno
- Platforms: 2 island platforms
- Tracks: 4

Other information
- Status: Staffed
- Station code: JI13, HC15
- Website: Official website (JR Kyushu); Official website (Heisei Chikuhō Railway)

History
- Opened: 15 August 1895
- Former names: Ita (to 1982)

Services
Preceding station	JR Kyushu	Following station
Tagawa-Gotōji towards Yoake	Hitahikosan Line	Ippommatsu towards Kokura
Preceding station	Heisei Chikuhō Railway	Following station
Shimoita towards Nōgata	Ita Line	Terminus
Kamiita towards Yukuhashi	Tagawa Line	Terminus
Location
- Location within Fukuoka Prefecture Location within Japan

Tagawa-Ita Station (田川伊田駅, Tagawa-Ita-eki) is a junction passenger railway station located in the city of Tagawa, Fukuoka Prefecture, Japan. It is operated jointly by the Kyushu Railway Company (JR Kyushu) by the third-sector railway operator Heisei Chikuhō Railway. On 1 April 2009, discount shop chain MrMax acquired naming rights to the Heisei Chikuhō part of the station. Therefore, the station is alternatively known as MrMax Tagawa-Ita Station (MrMax田川伊田駅, Misutā-Makkusu-Tagawa-Ita-eki).

== Lines ==
Tagawa-Ita Station is served by the Hitahikosan Line and is 27.4 kilometers from the starting point of that line at Jōno. It is also the terminus for both the Heisei Chikuhō Railway's Ita Line and Tagawa Line, and is 26.3 kilometers from the terminus of Ita Line at Yukuhashi and 16.1 kilometers from the terminus of the Tagawa Line at Nōgata.

== Layout ==
The station consists of two island platforms serving four tracks. The platforms are accessed through an underground passage (the passage itself is at ground level, as the tracks are on an embankment). Both platforms have stairs only, no elevators, and are not wheelchair accessible. The station building is a three-story steel frame building constructed by JR Kyushu in 1990, and has a retro-style exterior. It was purchased by the city of Tagawa in 2016, and now houses a hotel and restaurant. The station is staffed.

=== Platforms ===
1, 2	■ ■ Tagawa Line / ■ Ita Line	for Saigawa, Yukuhashi for Nōgata
3	■ JI Hitahikosan Line	for Kokura
4	■ JI Hitahikosan Line	for Tagawa-Gotōji and Soeda

== History ==
The station was opened on 15 August 1895 as Ita Station (伊田駅) on the Hōshū Railway. The railway merged with the Kyushu Railway in 1901 and was nationalized in 1907. It was renamed to its present name on 3 November 1982. With the privatization of the JNR on 1 April 1987, the station came under the control of JR Kyushu. The Tagawa Line and Ita Line were transferred to the Heisei Chikuhō Railway on 1 October 1989. The current station building was completed in 1990.

== Passenger statistics ==
In fiscal 2021, the station was used by an average of 491 passengers daily (boarding passengers only). In 2019, the Heisei Chikuhō Railway portion of the station was used by 401 passengers daily.

== Surrounding area ==
- Tagawa City Tagawa Elementary School
- Tagawa City Chinzei Elementary School
- Tagawa City Chinzei Junior High School
- Tagawa City Art Museum
- Tagawa City Coal and History Museum

== See also ==
- List of railway stations in Japan
