= Chikugogawa Prefectural Natural Park =

Park in Japan

- 筑後川県立自然公園
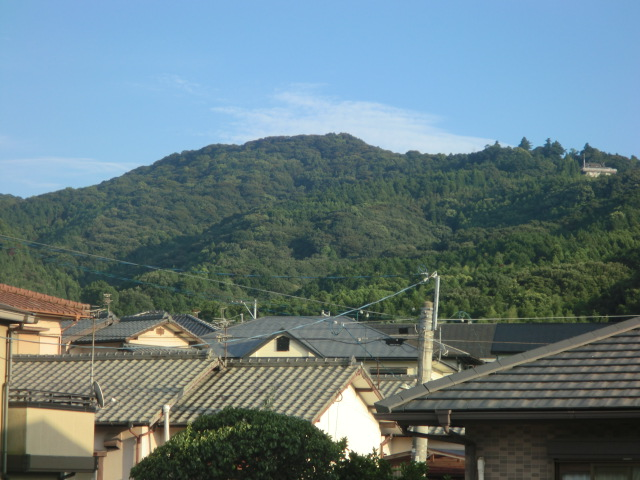
- Kōra-san (高良山) (312 m)
- Interactive map of Chikugogawa Prefectural Natural Park
- Location: Fukuoka Prefecture, Japan
- Coordinates: 33°17′52″N 130°34′28″E
- Area: 146.9 km^{2} (56.7 sq mi)
- Established: 13 May 1950

Chikugogawa Prefectural Natural Park (筑後川県立自然公園, Chikugogawa kenritsu shizen kōen) is a Prefectural Natural Park in Fukuoka Prefecture, Japan. Established in 1950, the park spans the municipalities of Kama, Asakura, Kurume, Ukiha, Yame, and Tachiarai. The park derives its name from the Chikugo River.

== See also ==
- National Parks of Japan
- List of Places of Scenic Beauty of Japan (Fukuoka)
