= Sefuri Raizan Prefectural Natural Park =

Natural park of Fukuoka prefecture, Japan

- 脊振雷山県立自然公園
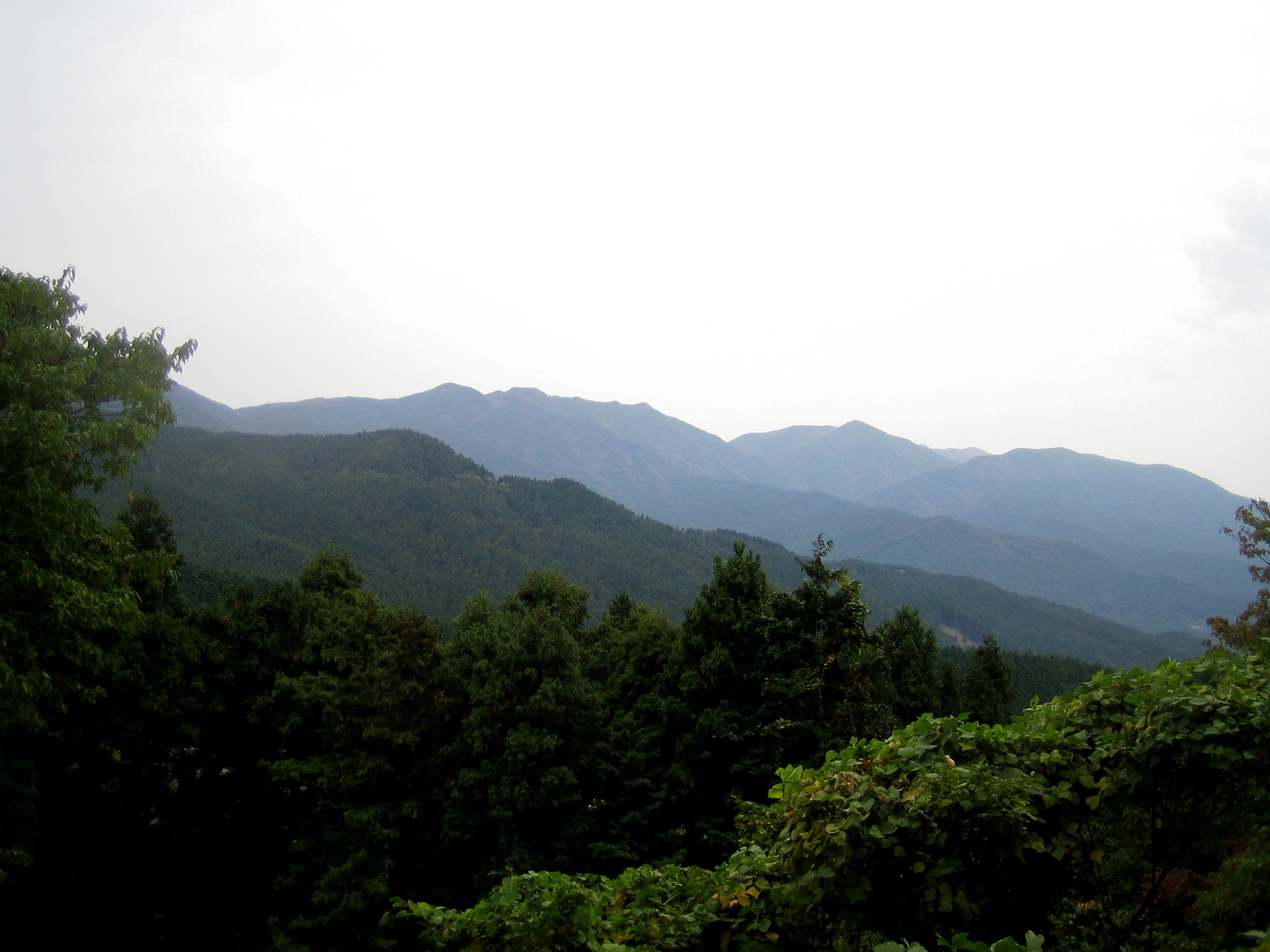
- Mount Sefuri (1055 m)
- Interactive map of Sefuri Raizan Prefectural Natural Park
- Location: Fukuoka Prefecture, Japan
- Coordinates: 33°26′11″N 130°22′7″E
- Area: 81.71 km^{2} (31.55 sq mi)
- Established: 14 September 1965

Sefuri Raizan Prefectural Natural Park (脊振雷山県立自然公園, Sefuri Raizan kenritsu shizen kōen) is a Prefectural Natural Park in Fukuoka Prefecture, Japan. Established in 1965, the park spans the municipalities of Fukuoka, Itoshima, and Nakagawa.

== See also ==
- National Parks of Japan
- Sefuri-Kitayama Prefectural Natural Park
- List of Places of Scenic Beauty of Japan (Fukuoka)
