= Yabegawa Prefectural Natural Park =

Natural park in Fukuoka Prefecture, Japan

- 矢部川県立自然公園
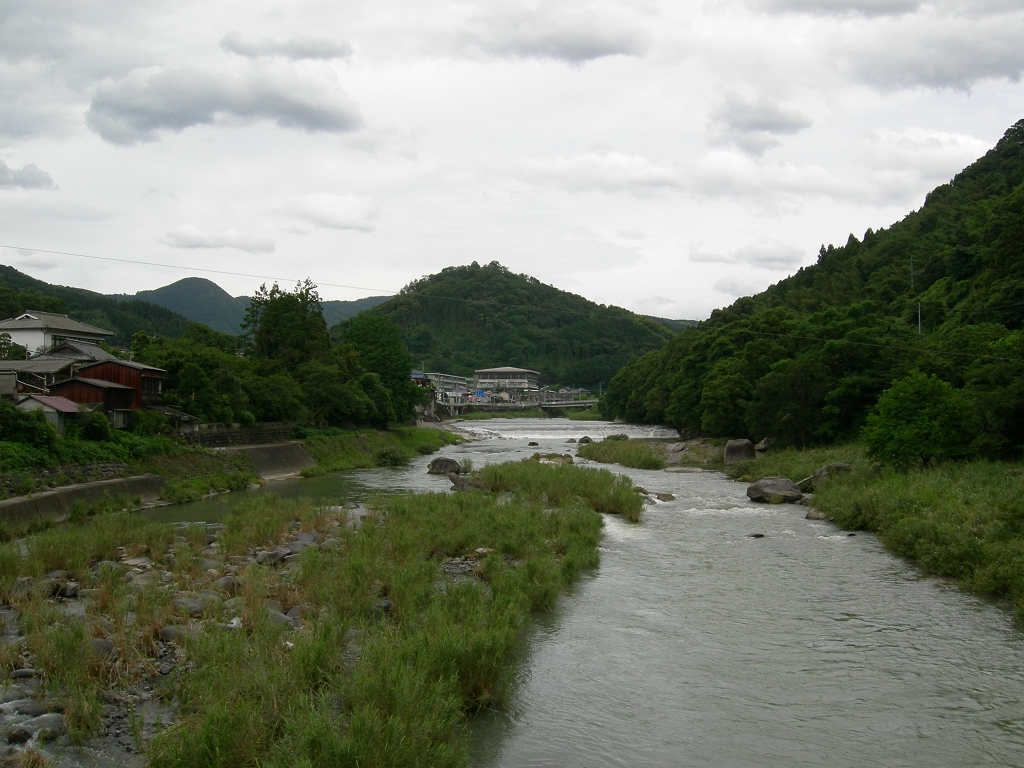
- Yabe River (矢部川) in Yame
- Interactive map of Yabegawa Prefectural Natural Park
- Location: Fukuoka Prefecture, Japan
- Coordinates: 33°10′32″N 130°46′14″E
- Area: 178.3 km^{2} (68.8 sq mi)
- Established: 13 May 1950

Yabegawa Prefectural Natural Park (矢部川県立自然公園, Yabegawa kenritsu shizen kōen) is a Prefectural Natural Park in Fukuoka Prefecture, Japan. Established in 1950, the park spans the municipalities of Yame, Chikugo, Miyama, and Ōmuta.

== See also ==
- National Parks of Japan
- List of Places of Scenic Beauty of Japan
