= Chikuhō Prefectural Natural Park =

Natural Park in Fukuoka Prefecture, Japan

- 筑豊県立自然公園
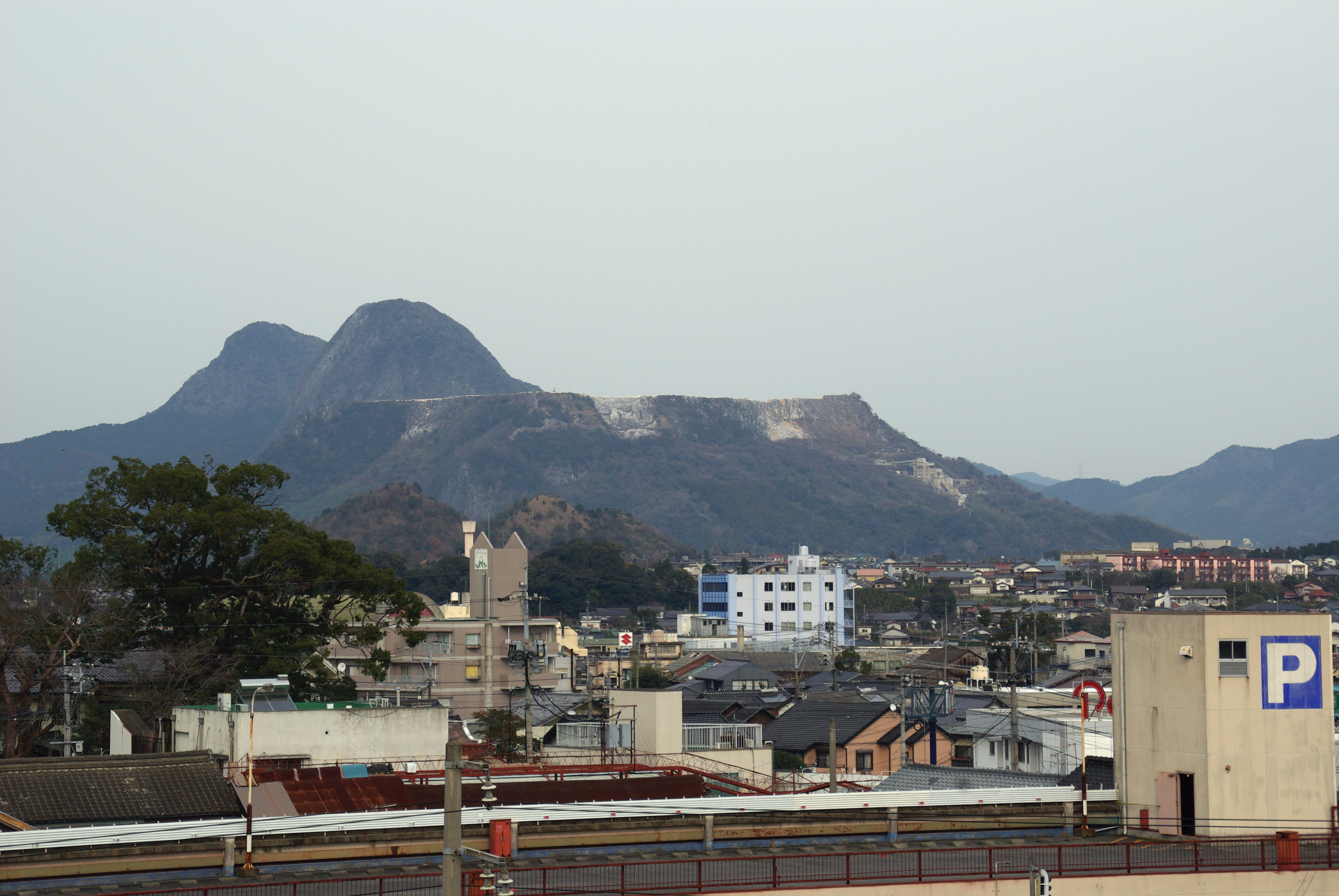
- Mount Kawara (香春岳) (509 m)
- Interactive map of Chikuhō Prefectural Natural Park
- Location: Fukuoka Prefecture, Japan
- Coordinates: 33°41′32″N 130°50′41″E
- Area: 85.5 km^{2} (33.0 sq mi)
- Established: 13 May 1950

Chikuhō Prefectural Natural Park (筑豊県立自然公園, Chikuhō kenritsu shizen kōen) is a Prefectural Natural Park in Fukuoka Prefecture, Japan. Established in 1950, the park spans the municipalities of Kitakyūshū, Yukuhashi, Nōgata, Tagawa, Kawara, Fukuchi, Kanda, Miyako, Chikujō, and Aka.

== See also ==
- National Parks of Japan
- List of Places of Scenic Beauty of Japan (Fukuoka)
