= Sefuri-Kitayama Prefectural Natural Park =

Natural park of Saga prefecture, Japan

- 脊振北山県立自然公園
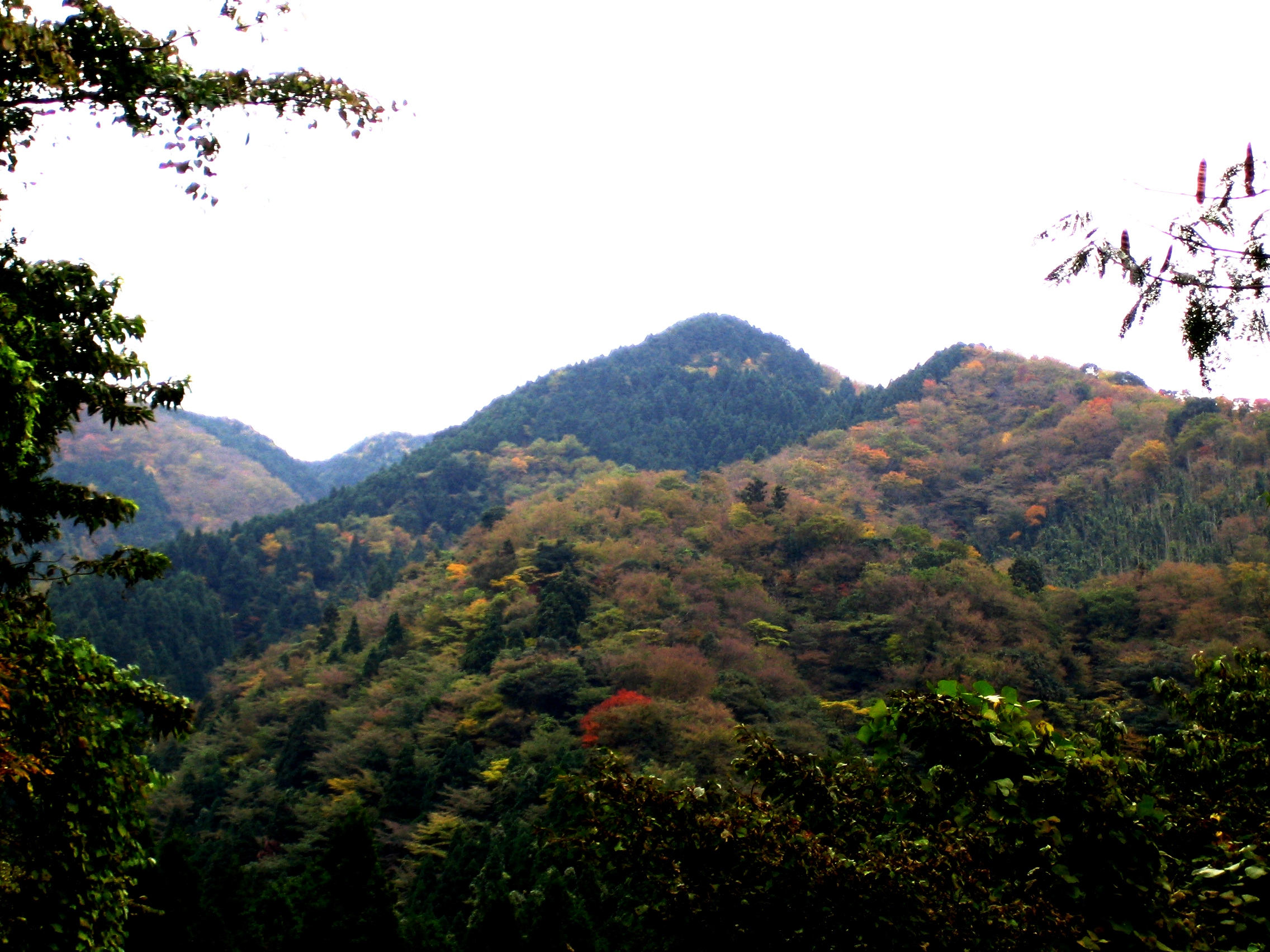
- Mount Sefuri (1055 m)
- Interactive map of Sefuri-Kitayama Prefectural Natural Park
- Location: Saga Prefecture, Japan
- Area: 79.67 km^{2} (30.76 sq mi)
- Established: 12 December 1975

Sefuri-Kitayama Prefectural Natural Park (脊振北山県立自然公園, Sefuri-Kitayama kenritsu shizen kōen) is a Prefectural Natural Park in northern Saga Prefecture, Japan. Established in 1975, the park spans the municipalities of Kanzaki, Karatsu, Kiyama, Miyaki, Saga, Tosu, and Yoshinogari.

== See also ==
- Sefuri Raizan Prefectural Natural Park
- National Parks of Japan
