= Fukuoka Prefecture =

Prefecture of Japan

Fukuoka Prefecture 福岡県
- Prefecture

Japanese transcription(s)
  - Japanese: 福岡県
  - Rōmaji: Fukuoka-ken
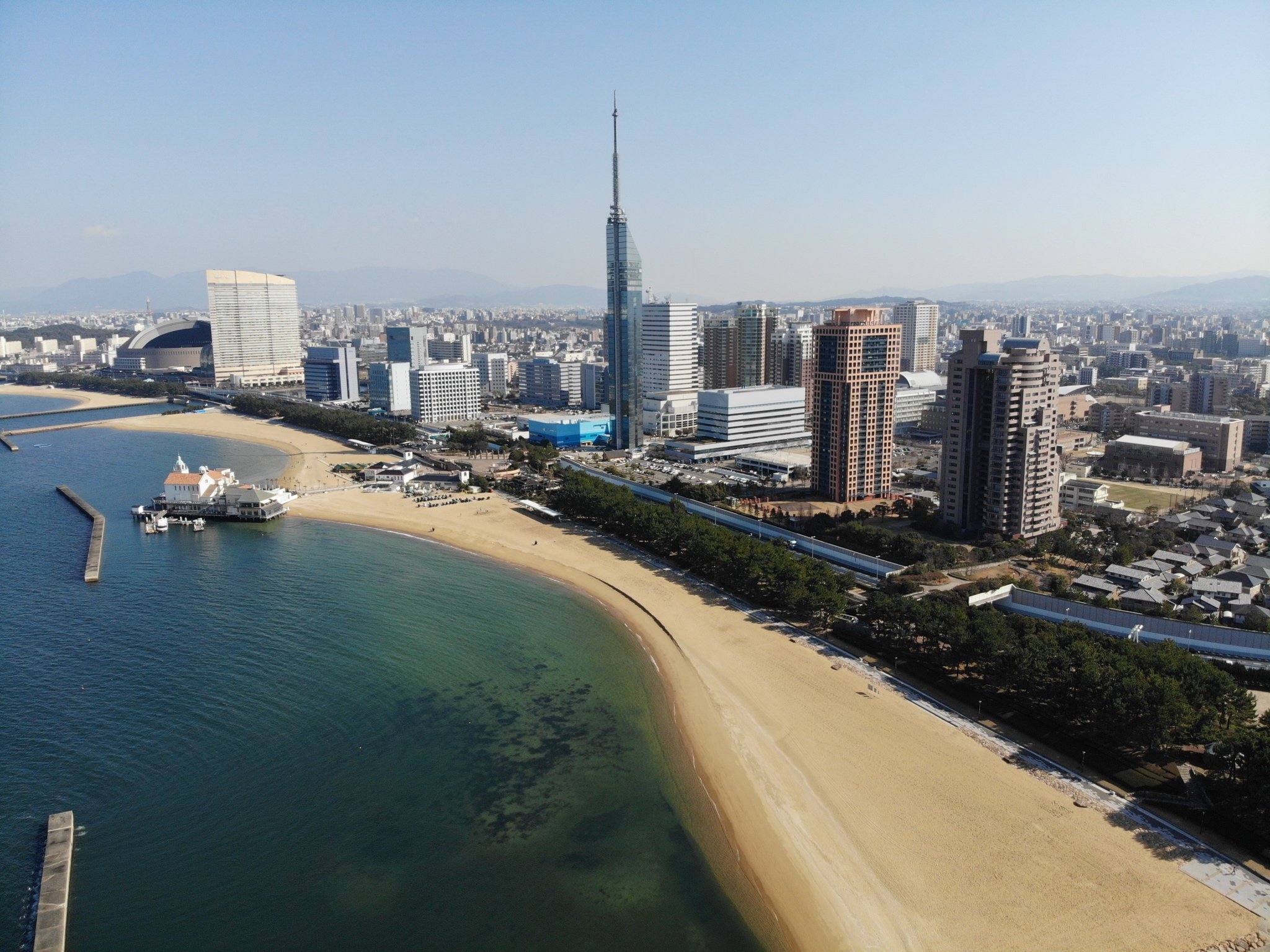
- Aerial view of Seaside Momochi with the Fukuoka Tower and Momochi Seaside Park in the center and Mizuho PayPay Dome Fukuoka to the left side

- Flag Symbol
- Anthem: 希望の光; Kibō no Hikari "Light of Hope"
- Coordinates: 33°36′N 130°35′E
- Country: Japan
- Region: Kyushu
- Island: Kyushu
- Capital: Fukuoka
- Subdivisions: Districts: 12, Municipalities: 60

Government
  - Governor: Seitaro Hattori (since April 2021)

Area
  - Total: 4,986.52 km^{2} (1,925.31 sq mi)
  - Rank: 29th

Population (October 1, 2025)
  - Total: 5,081,879
  - Rank: 8th
  - Density: 1,021/km^{2} (2,640/sq mi)
  - Dialects: Chikuzen・Buzen・Chikuho

GDP
  - Total: JP¥20,187 billion US$149.1 billion (2022)
- ISO 3166 code: JP-40
- Website: www.pref.fukuoka.lg.jp/somu/ multilingual/english/top.html
- Symbols of Japan
- Bird: Japanese bush warbler (Cettia diphone)
- Flower: Ume blossom (Prunus mume)
- Tree: Azalea (Rhododendron tsutsusi)

Fukuoka Prefecture (福岡県, Fukuoka-ken; Japanese pronunciation: [ɸɯ̥̈.kɯ̈́.ò̞.kä̀, -ó̞.kä́.kè̞ɴ̀]) is a prefecture of Japan located on the island of Kyūshū. Fukuoka Prefecture has a population of 5,081,879 (1 October 2025) and has a geographic area of 4,986 square kilometres (1,925 sq mi). Fukuoka Prefecture borders Saga Prefecture to the southwest, Kumamoto Prefecture to the south, and Ōita Prefecture to the southeast.

Fukuoka is the capital and largest city of Fukuoka Prefecture, and the largest city on Kyūshū, with other major cities including Kitakyushu, Kurume, and Ōmuta. Fukuoka Prefecture is located at the northernmost point of Kyūshū on the Kanmon Straits, connecting the Tsushima Strait and the Seto Inland Sea across from Yamaguchi Prefecture on the island of Honshu, and extends south towards the Ariake Sea.

== History ==
Fukuoka Prefecture includes the former provinces of Chikugo, Chikuzen, and Buzen.

=== Shrines and temples ===
Kōra taisha, Sumiyoshi-jinja, and Hakozaki-gū are the chief Shinto shrines (ichinomiya) in the prefecture.

There are several historically important Buddhist temples in the Prefecture. Monks would sail back from China after completing their studies and establish temples in the heart of Hakata (now Fukuoka) City. Monk Eisai founded Shōfuku-ji which is known today as the oldest zen temple in Japan, monk Kukai established Tocho-ji, and Joten-ji was built by Enni who is also known for bringing Udon noodles first to Japan. The oldest temple is Kanzeon-ji that was founded by the Emperor in Dazaifu during the 7th century to honor his mother. Kanzeon-ji together with Kaidan-in, that used to be part of the former, was one of the three distinct places in Japan where Buddhist monks could ordain.

During the Tokugawa shogunate when the country was ruled by 300 local feudal lords (daimyo), an important daimyo, Arima Toyōji was relocated to this region and thus he moved his family temple to Kurume City. This zen temple is known today as Bairin-ji and is a main temple for zen practice in Fukuoka Prefecture and Kyushu. It is located on the West bank of Chiguko River, next to the Shinkansen station of Kurume city.

== Geography ==
Map of Fukuoka Prefecture Government Ordinance Designated City City Town Village

Fukuoka Prefecture faces the sea on three sides, bordering Saga, Ōita, and Kumamoto prefectures and facing Yamaguchi Prefecture across the Kanmon Straits.

Historical population
Year	Pop.	±% p.a.
1890	1,236,015	—
1903	1,571,158	+1.86%
1913	1,926,417	+2.06%
1920	2,188,249	+1.84%
1925	2,301,668	+1.02%
1930	2,527,119	+1.89%
1935	2,755,804	+1.75%
1940	3,094,132	+2.34%
1945	2,746,855	−2.35%
1950	3,530,169	+5.15%
1955	3,859,764	+1.80%
1960	4,006,679	+0.75%
1965	3,964,611	−0.21%
1970	4,027,416	+0.31%
1975	4,292,963	+1.29%
1980	4,553,461	+1.19%
1985	4,719,259	+0.72%
1990	4,811,050	+0.39%
1995	4,933,393	+0.50%
2000	5,015,699	+0.33%
2005	5,049,908	+0.14%
2010	5,071,968	+0.09%
2015	5,102,871	+0.12%
2020	5,135,214	+0.13%
2025	5,081,879	−0.21%

As of 1 April 2012, 18% of the land area of the prefecture was designated as natural parks: Setonaikai National Park, Genkai, Kitakyūshū, and Yaba-Hita-Hikosan quasi-national parks, and Chikugogawa, Chikuhō, Dazaifu, Sefuri Raizan, and Yabegawa Prefectural Natural Parks.

Fukuoka includes the two largest cities on Kyūshū, Fukuoka and Kitakyushu, and much of Kyūshū's industry. It also includes a number of small islands near the north coast of Kyūshū.

=== Cities ===
There are twenty-nine cities in Fukuoka Prefecture:

Name		Area (km^{2})	Population	Map
Rōmaji	Kanji	Area (km^{2})	Population	Map
Asakura	朝倉市	246.71	50,488	
Buzen	豊前市	111.10	23,844	
Chikugo	筑後市	41.78	49,259	
Chikushino	筑紫野市	87.73	106,513	
Dazaifu	太宰府市	29.60	71,505	
Fukuoka (capital)	福岡市	343.39	1,603,543	
Fukutsu	福津市	52.76	68,834	
Iizuka	飯塚市	213.96	124,757	
Itoshima	糸島市	215.69	103,655	
Kama	嘉麻市	135.11	34,800	
Kasuga	春日市	14.15	111,840	
Kitakyūshū	北九州市	491.95	902,358	
Koga	古賀市	42.07	59,282	
Kurume	久留米市	229.96	295,367	
Miyama	みやま市	105.21	34,907	
Miyawaka	宮若市	139.99	26,447	
Munakata	宗像市	119.94	96,786	
Nakagawa	那珂川市	74.95	49,400	
Nakama	中間市	15.96	39,366	
Nōgata	直方市	61.76	55,151	
Ogōri	小郡市	45.51	59,590	
Ōkawa	大川市	33.62	31,605	
Ōmuta	大牟田市	81.45	106,393	
Ōnojō	大野城市	26.89	102,818	
Tagawa	田川市	54.55	45,389	
Ukiha	うきは市	117.46	27,723	
Yame	八女市	482.44	37,782	
Yanagawa	柳川市	77.15	62,268	
Yukuhashi	行橋市	70.06	72,376	

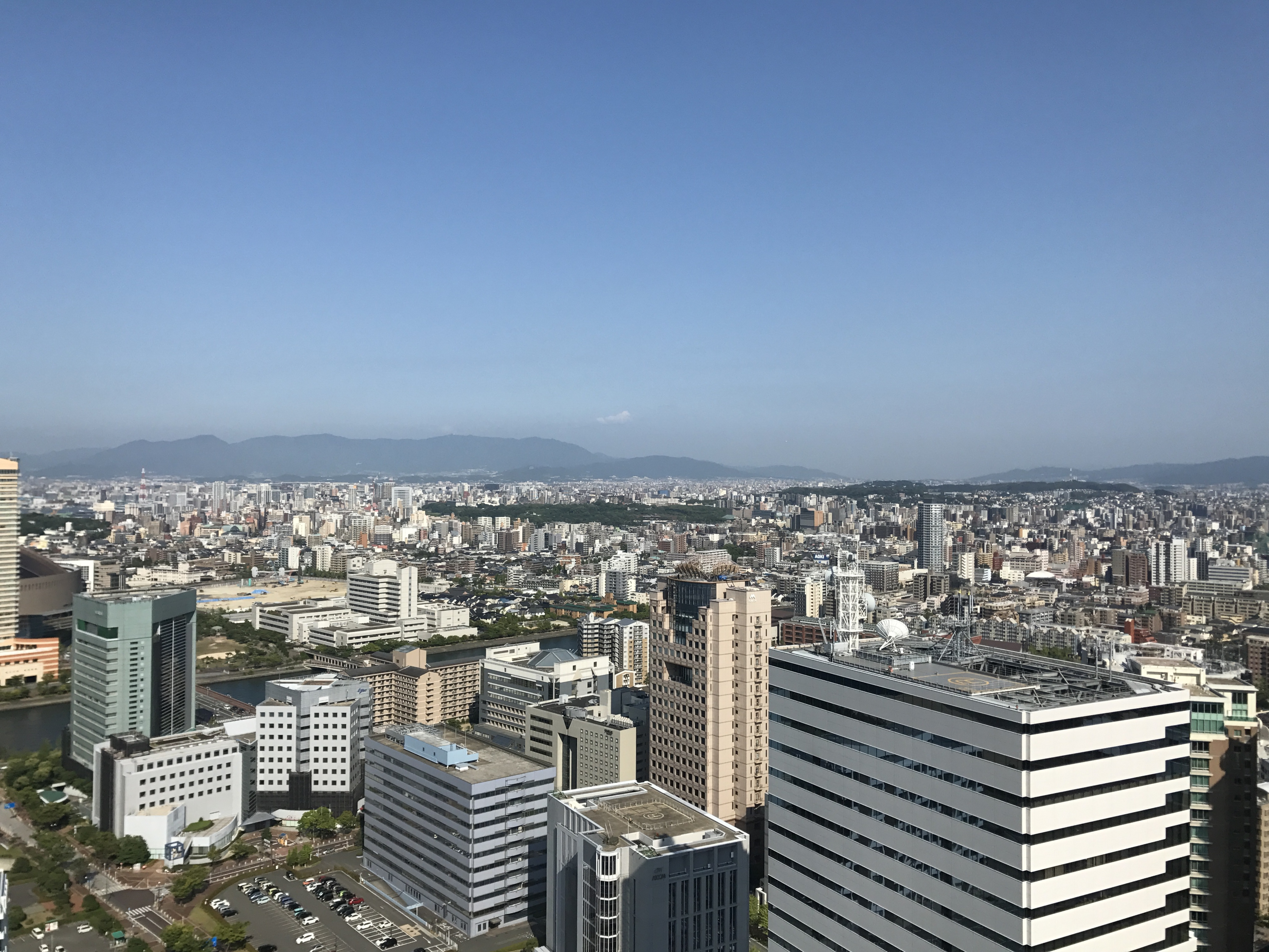
Fukuoka City

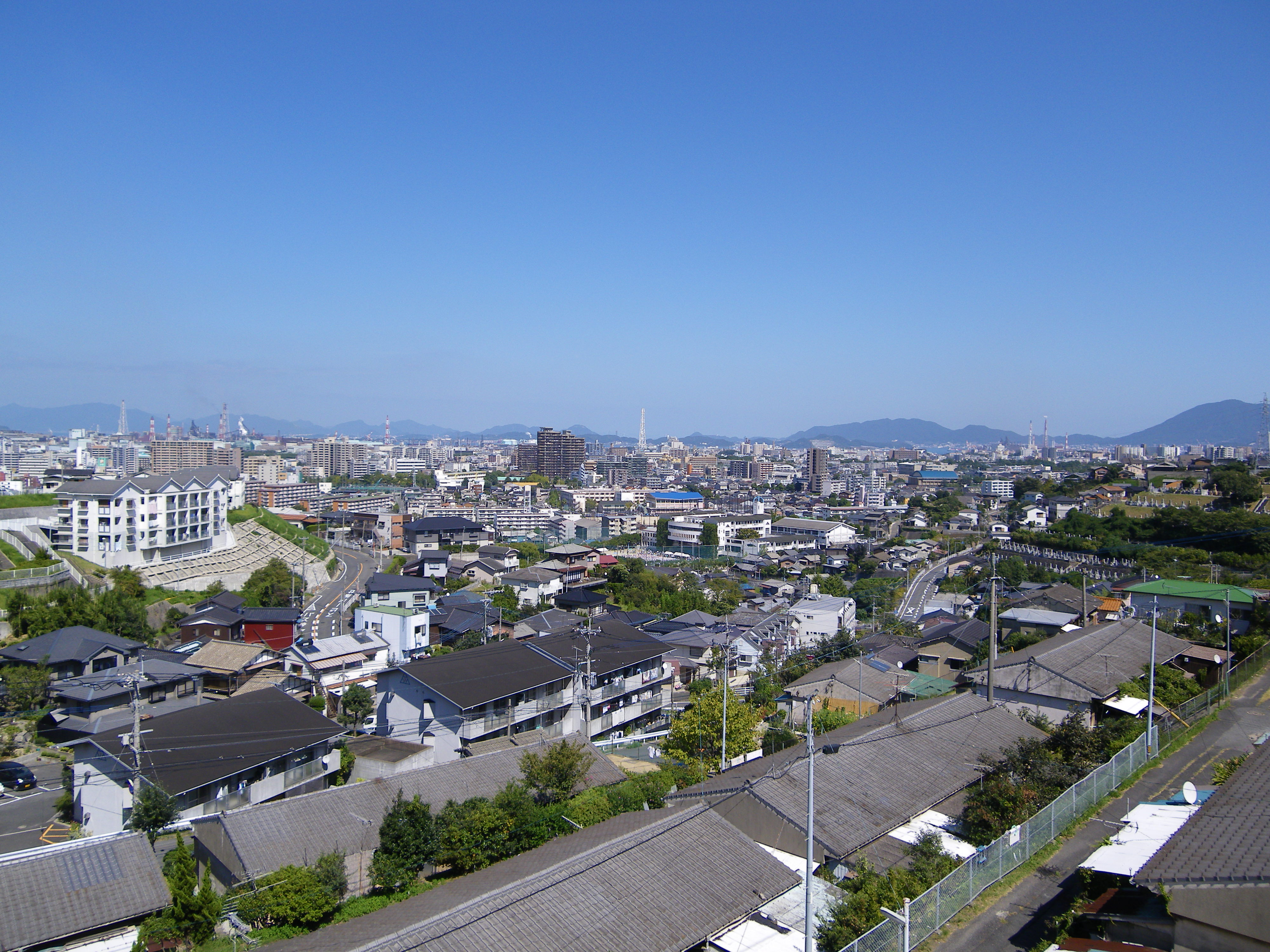
Tobata, Kitakyushu

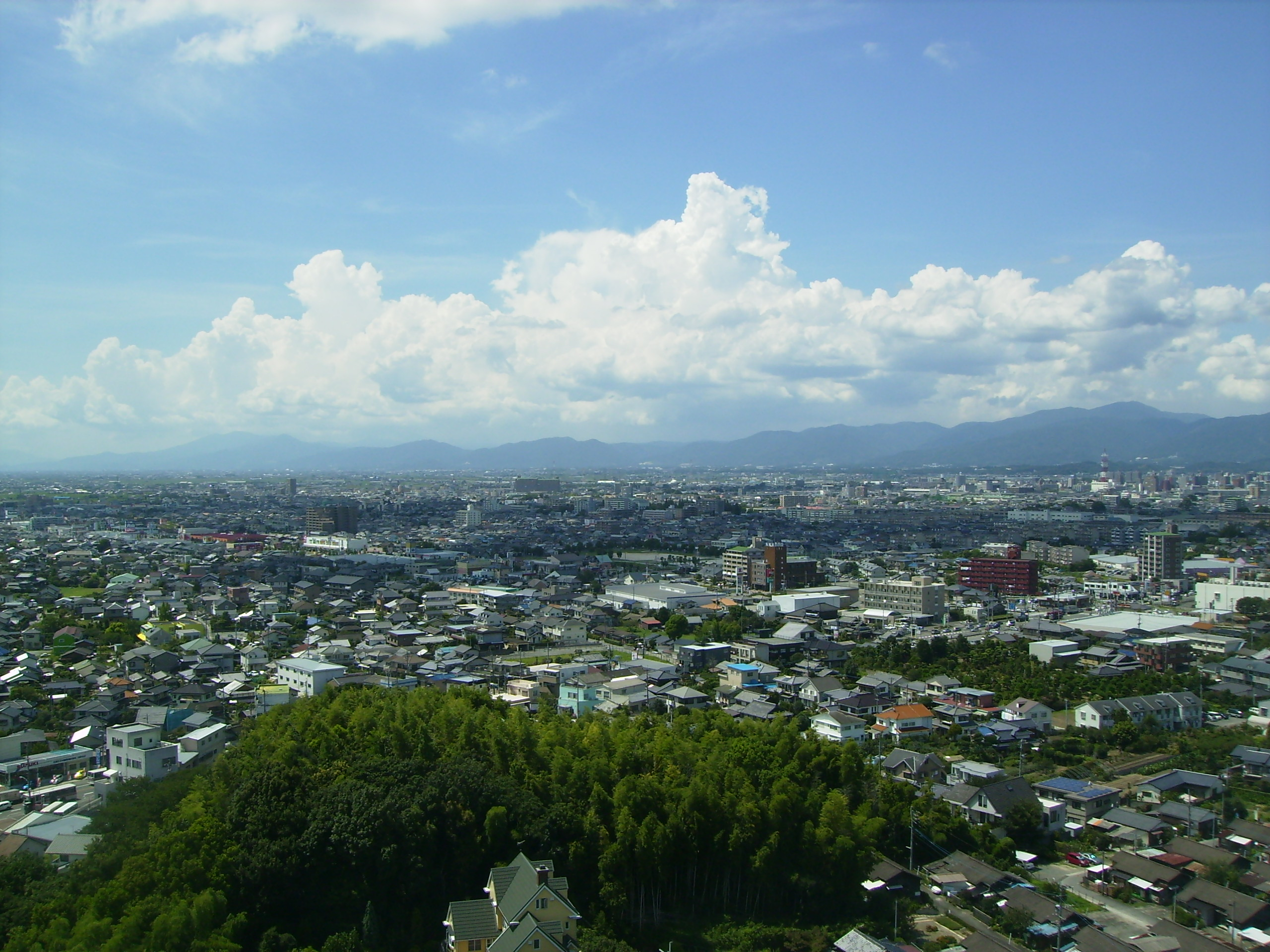
Kurume

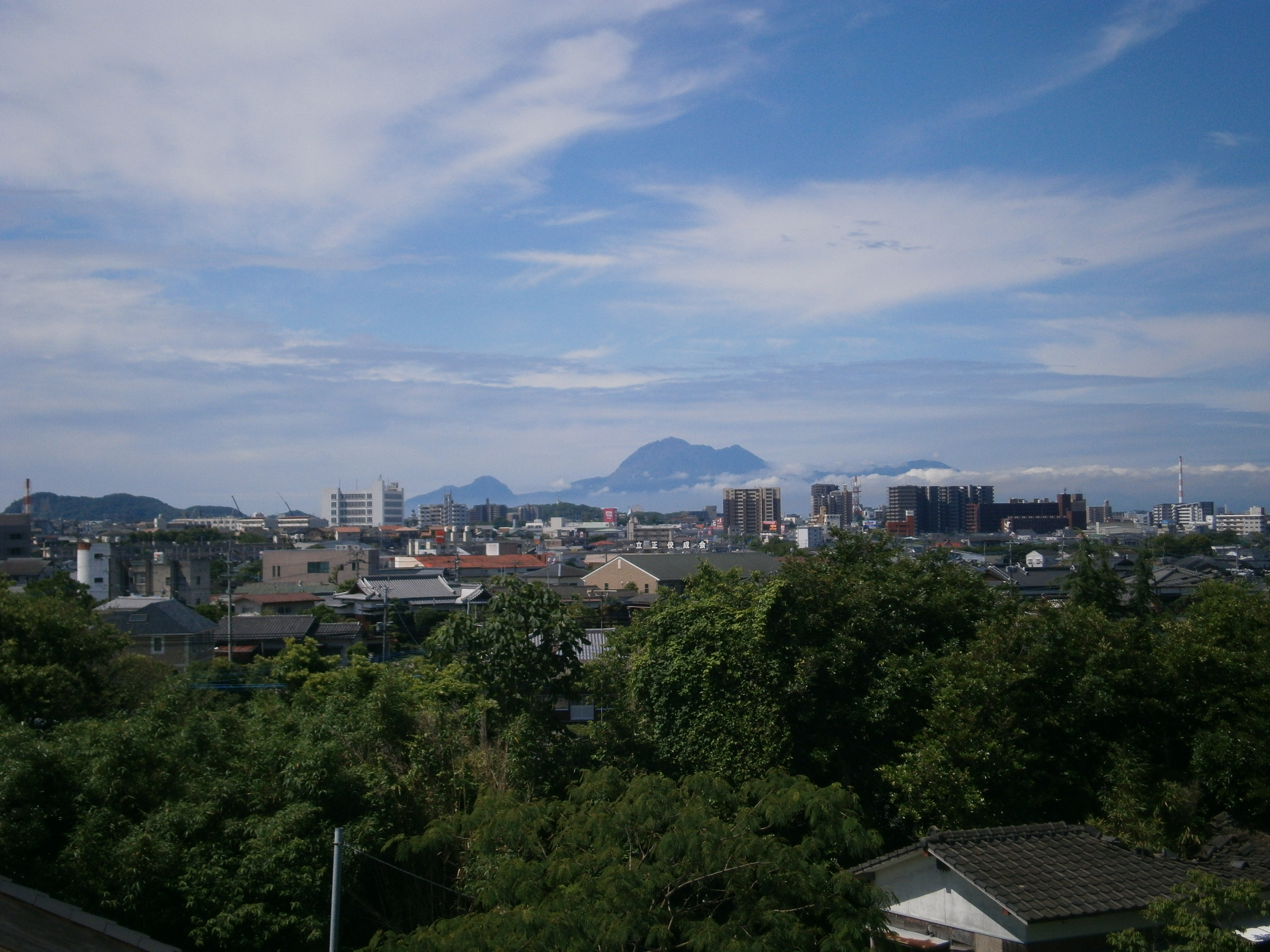
Omuta

=== Towns and villages ===
These are the towns and villages in each district:

Name		Area (km^{2})	Population	District	Map
Rōmaji	Kanji	Area (km^{2})	Population	District	Map
Aka	赤村	31.98	3,065	Tagawa District	
Ashiya	芦屋町	11.60	12,930	Onga District	
Chikujō	築上町	119.61	16,834	Chikujō District	
Chikuzen	筑前町	67.10	30,470	Asakura District	
Fukuchi	福智町	42.06	21,201	Tagawa District	
Hirokawa	広川町	37.94	19,215	Yame District	
Hisayama	久山町	37.44	9,355	Kasuya District	
Itoda	糸田町	8.04	8,448	Tagawa District	
Kanda	苅田町	48.98	37,626	Miyako District	
Kasuya	粕屋町	14.13	48,731	Kasuya District	
Kawara	香春町	44.50	10,164	Tagawa District	
Kawasaki	川崎町	36.14	15,219	Tagawa District	
Keisen	桂川町	20.14	12,832	Kaho District	
Kōge	上毛町	62.44	7,269	Chikujō District	
Kotake	小竹町	14.28	6,983	Kurate District	
Kurate	鞍手町	35.60	14,988	Kurate District	
Miyako	みやこ町	151.34	18,049	Miyako District	
Mizumaki	水巻町	11.01	27,571	Onga District	
Okagaki	岡垣町	48.64	31,553	Onga District	
Ōki	大木町	18.44	13,716	Mizuma District	
Onga	遠賀町	22.15	18,970	Onga District	
Ōtō	大任町	14.26	5,066	Tagawa District	
Sasaguri	篠栗町	38.93	31,191	Kasuya District	
Shime	志免町	8.69	46,388	Kasuya District	
Shingū	新宮町	18.93	33,142	Kasuya District	
Soeda	添田町	132.20	8,725	Tagawa District	
Sue	須恵町	16.31	29,248	Kasuya District	
Tachiarai	大刀洗町	22.84	16,065	Mii District	
Tōhō	東峰村	51.97	1,842	Asakura District	
Umi	宇美町	30.21	36,907	Kasuya District	
Yoshitomi	吉富町	5.72	6,617	Chikujō District	

== Economy ==
Fukuoka prefecture's main cities form one of Japan's main industrial centers, accounting for nearly 40% of the economy of Kyūshū. GDP exceeds 154 billion US dollars, comparable to that of a medium-sized country. Major industries include automobiles, semiconductors, and steel. Fukuoka prefecture is where tire manufacturer Bridgestone and consumer electronics chain Best Denki were founded.

Well-known company headquartered in Fukuoka are as follows:

- TOTO Ltd. (founded in 1917)
- Yasukawa Electric Corporation (founded in 1915)
- PIETRO Co., Ltd. (founded in 1980)
- ZENRIN CO., Ltd. (founded in 1949)
- SANIX INCORPORATED (founded in 1975)
- HASEGAWA Co.Ltd. (founded in 1929)
- Plenus Co., Ltd. (founded in 1976)
- LEVEL-5 Inc. (founded in 1998)
- Star Flyer Inc. (founded in 2002)
- DAIICHI KOUTSU SANGYO Co., Ltd. (founded in 1960)
- Shabondama Soap Co., Ltd. (founded in 1910)
- MoonStar Company. (founded in 1873)
- Shinoken Group. Co., Ltd. (founded in 1990)

== Universities ==
One of Japan's top 5 universities, Kyushu University, is located in Fukuoka.

Institution	Location
Fukuoka University	Fukuoka
Kurume University	Kurume
Kyushu Institute of Technology	Kitakyūshū and Iizuka
Kyushu University	Fukuoka and Kasuga
Seinan Gakuin University	Fukuoka
Kyushu Institute of Information Sciences	Dazaifu
Kyushu Sangyo University	Fukuoka
Fukuoka Women's University	Fukuoka
Fukuoka University of Education	Munakata

== Demographics ==
Fukuoka prefecture population pyramid

According to October 2018 estimates, the population in Fukuoka Prefecture reached 5,111,494 inhabitants, making the prefecture the 9th most populated of Japan's 47 prefectures. It is one of the few prefectures with a steadily increasing population.

According to the 2020 Census, the population of Fukuoka Prefecture was 5,135,214. While the population had been increasing for decades, it has recently entered a declining phase. Based on the 2023 projections by the National Institute of Population and Social Security Research (IPSS), the population is estimated to have fallen to approximately 5,088,000 by 2025 and is projected to drop below the 5 million mark by 2030.

According to the 2025 Census, the population of Fukuoka Prefecture was 5,081,879. The population declined by 1.0% or 53,335 from 2020, matching previous projections. Fukuoka Prefecture moved up from 9th to 8th most-populated in Japan, as Hokkaido has a much larger rate of decline.

== Culture ==
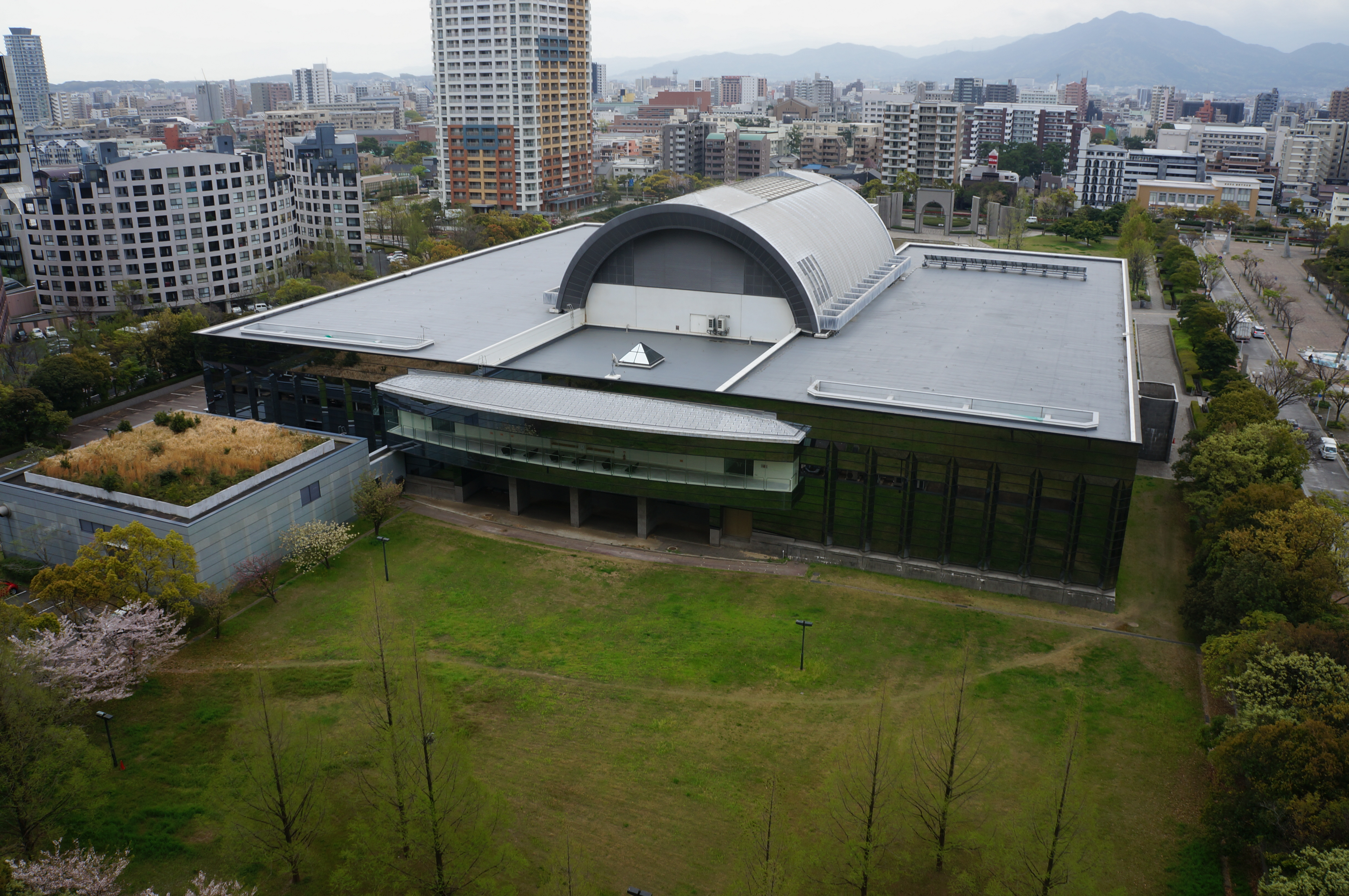
Fukuoka City Museum

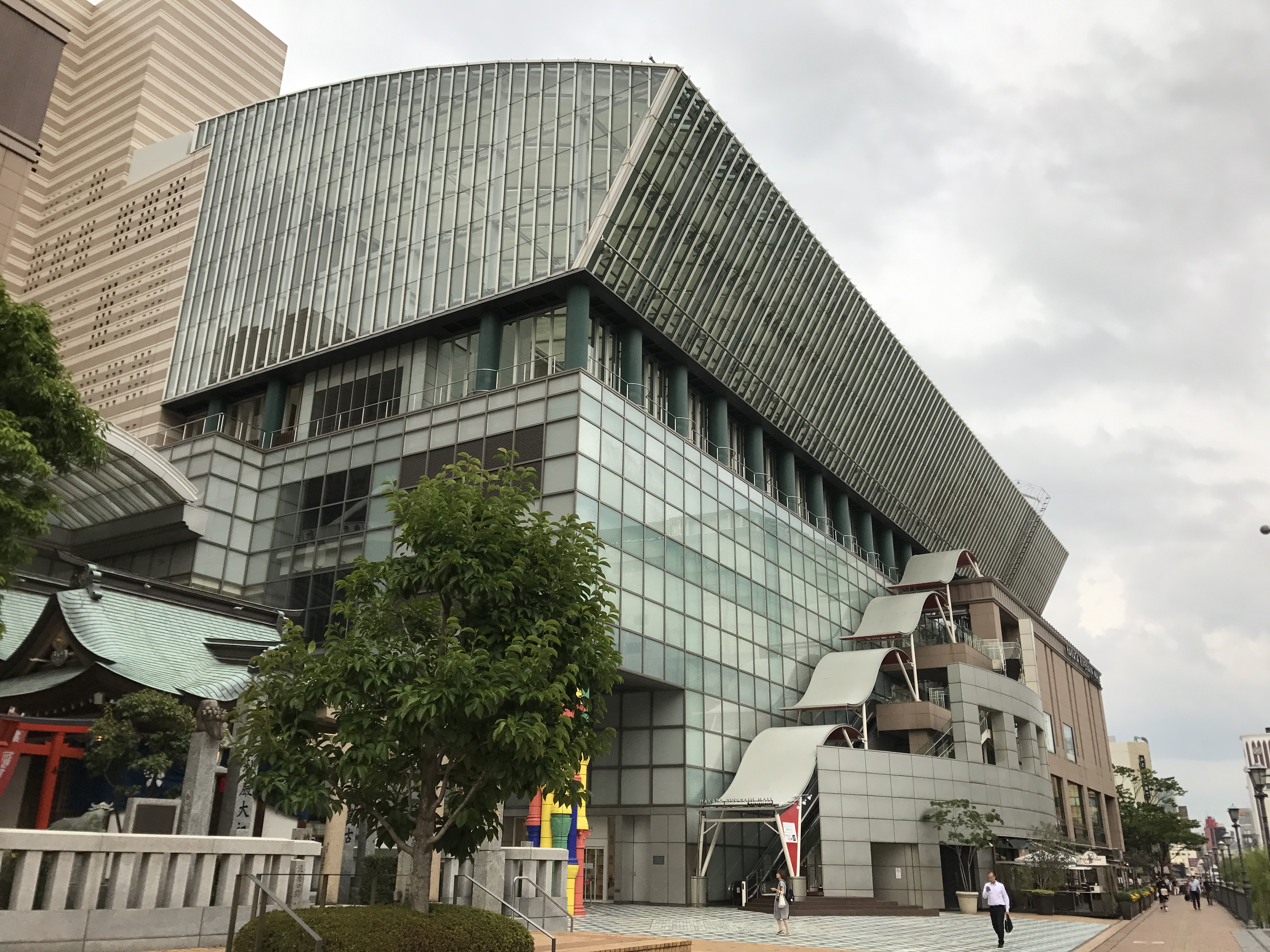
Fukuoka Asian Art Museum

Bulwarks against Mongol Invasion video

- Fukuoka Art Museum – In Ohori Park; contains a wide selection of contemporary and other art from around the world
- Fukuoka Asian Art Museum – contains art from Asia
- Fukuoka City Museum – displays a broad range of items from the region's history, including a spectacular gold seal
- Genko Historical Museum (元寇史料館, Museum of the Mongol Invasion) in Higashi Koen (East Park) displays Japanese and Mongolian arms and armor from the 13th century as well as paintings on historical subjects; open on weekends
- Hakata Machiya Folk Museum – Dedicated to displaying the traditional ways of life, speech, and culture of the Fukuoka region
- Fukuoka Castle – a castle in Chūō-ku, Fukuoka
- Hakata Gion Yamakasa – Japanese festival celebrated 1–15 July
- Ōhori Park – a registered Place of Scenic Beauty
- Kyushu National Museum – The collections cover the history of Kyūshū from prehistory to the Meiji era with particular emphasis on the rich history of cultural exchange between Kyūshū and neighboring China and Korea
- HKT48 Theater – where the idol group HKT48 performs every day
- LinQ – the Kyushu idol group meaning "Love in Kyushu", local theater where the LinQ performs weekly on Saturday and Sunday in Tenjin Best Hall
- Bairin-ji – Rinzai temple and garden in Kurume
- Zendō-ji – Jōdo-shū temple in Kurume

== Major events and festivals ==
- Hakata Dontaku Harbour Festival, Tenjin, Fukuoka on May 3 and 4
- Hakata Gion Yamakasa, Kushida Shrine, Fukuoka in July
- Kokura Gion Yamagasa, Kitakyushu in July
- Tobata Gion Yamagasa, Kitakyushu in July
- Kurosaki Gion Yamagasa, Kitakyushu in July
- Kitahara Hakushu Festival, Yanagawa on November 1 to 3

== Sports ==
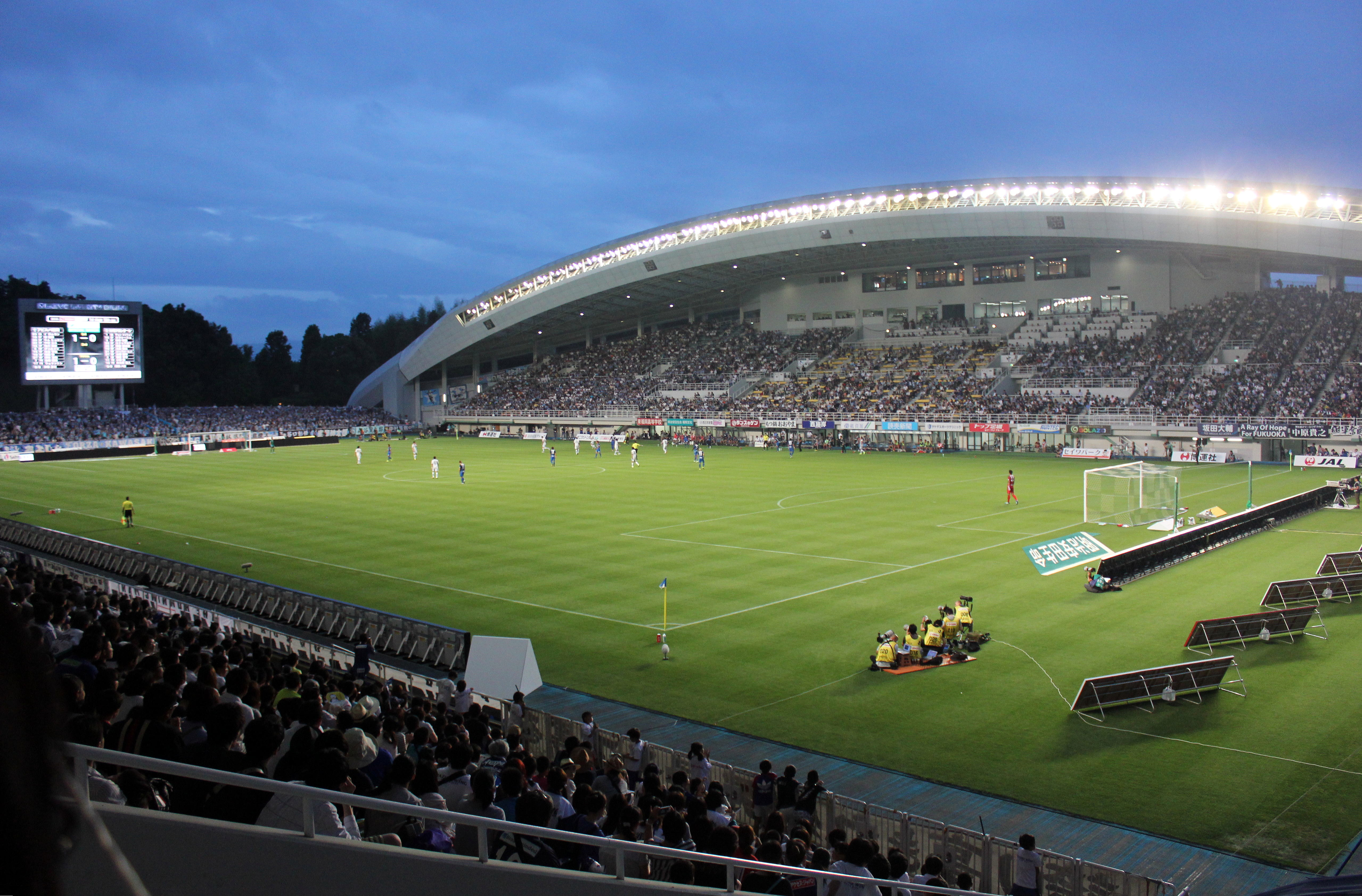
Level5 Stadium, home of the Avispa Fukuoka football team

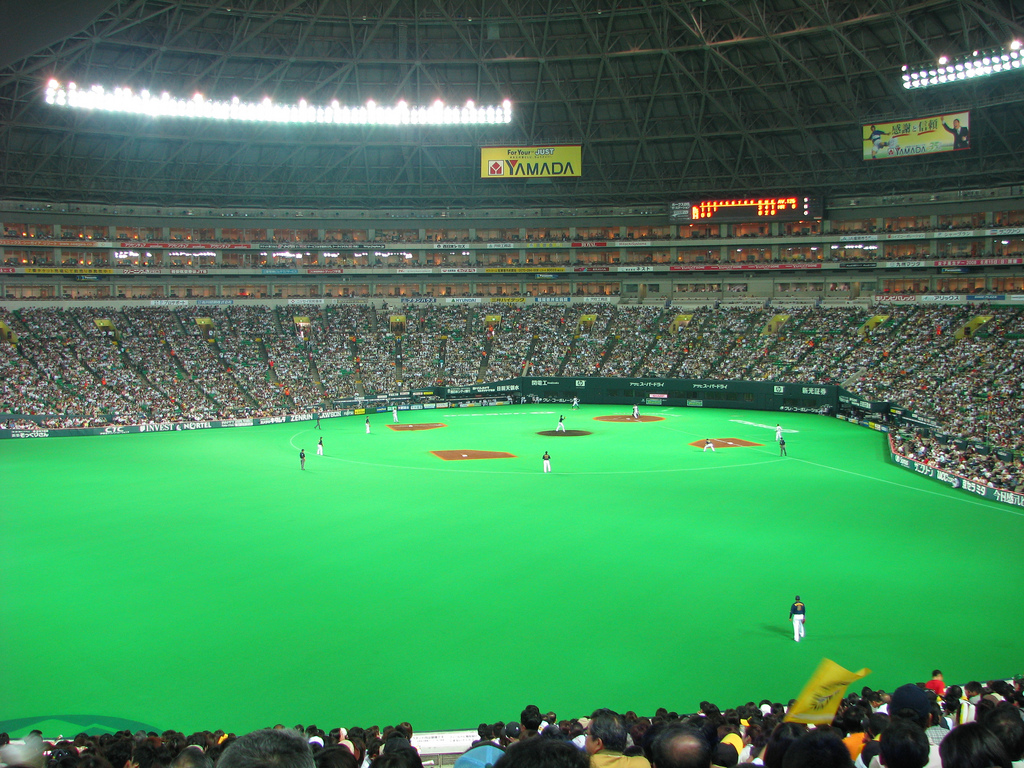
Fukuoka Yahuoku Dome, home of the Softbank Hawks

The sports teams listed below are based in Fukuoka.

Football (soccer)

- Avispa Fukuoka (Fukuoka City)
- Giravanz Kitakyushu (Kitakyūshū City)
- Fukuoka J. Anclas

Baseball

- Fukuoka SoftBank Hawks (Fukuoka City)

Basketball

- Rizing Zephyr Fukuoka (Fukuoka City)

Rugby

- Coca-Cola Red Sparks (Fukuoka City)
- Fukuoka Sanix Blues (Munakata)
- Kyuden Voltex
- Sanix World Rugby Youth Tournament

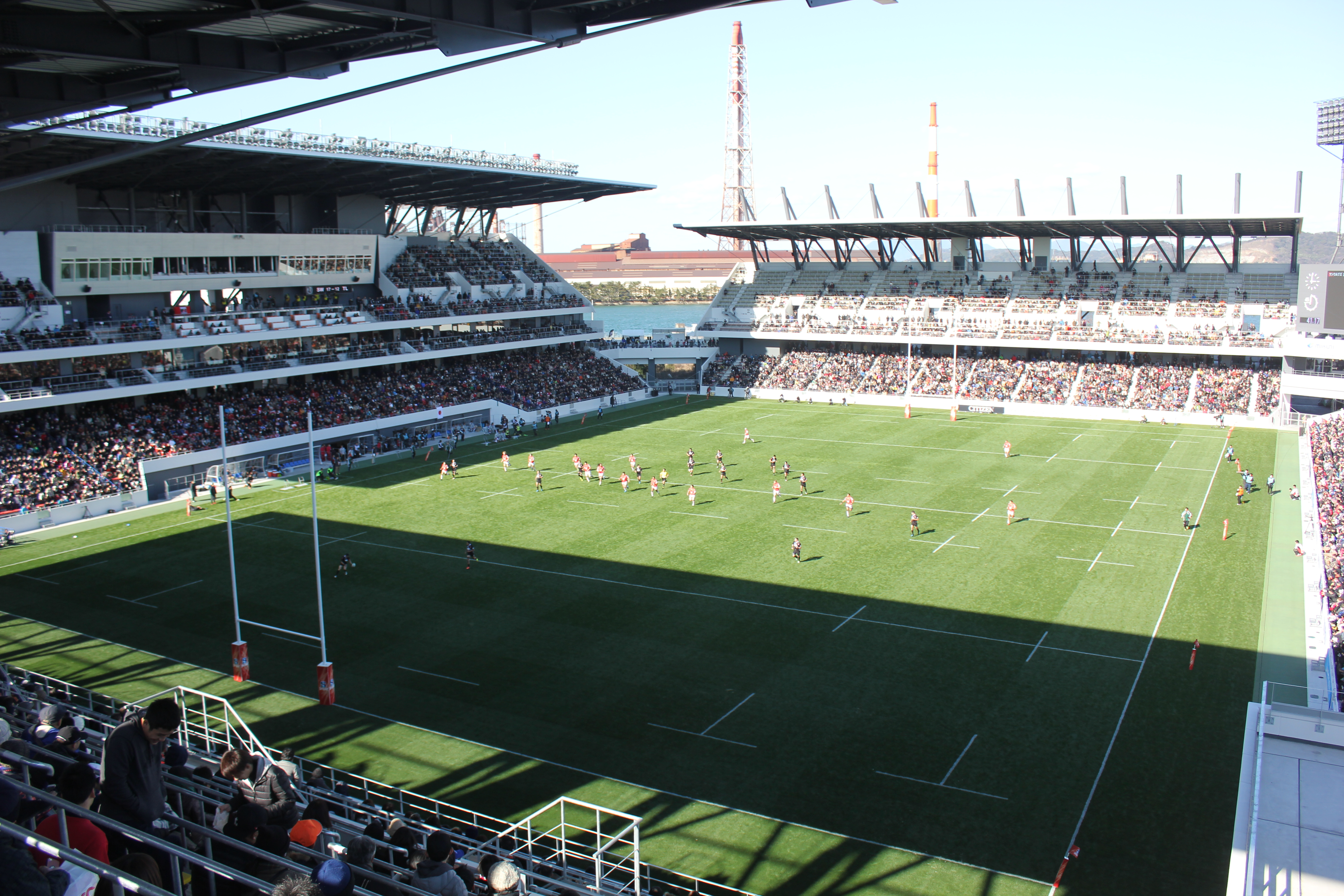
Mikuni World Stadium, home of Giravanz Kitakyushu

The prefecture hosts the Fukuoka International Cross Country competition. The prefecture also hosted the Fukuoka Marathon, which was an elite marathon in which marathon world records were established twice during its 75-year existence. Its final race took place in 2021.

== Crime and safety ==
Fukuoka Prefecture has the most designated yakuza groups among all of the prefectures, at five: the Kudo-kai, the Taishu-kai, the Fukuhaku-kai, the Dojin-kai and the Namikawa-kai. Between 2004 and 2009, and in early 2011, Fukuoka Prefecture led the nation in gun-related incidents. These incidents were mostly related to the local yakuza syndicates, specifically the Kudo-kai, the Dojin-kai, and the Kyushu Seido-kai.

Fukuoka Prefecture had the highest frequency of youth crime among the prefectures of Japan from 2003 to 2007.

According to statistics from the national police, the crime rate in Fukuoka was the eighth-highest in 2017, lower than in Osaka, Tokyo, Hyogo, Aichi, Saitama, Chiba and Ibaraki.

== Tourism ==
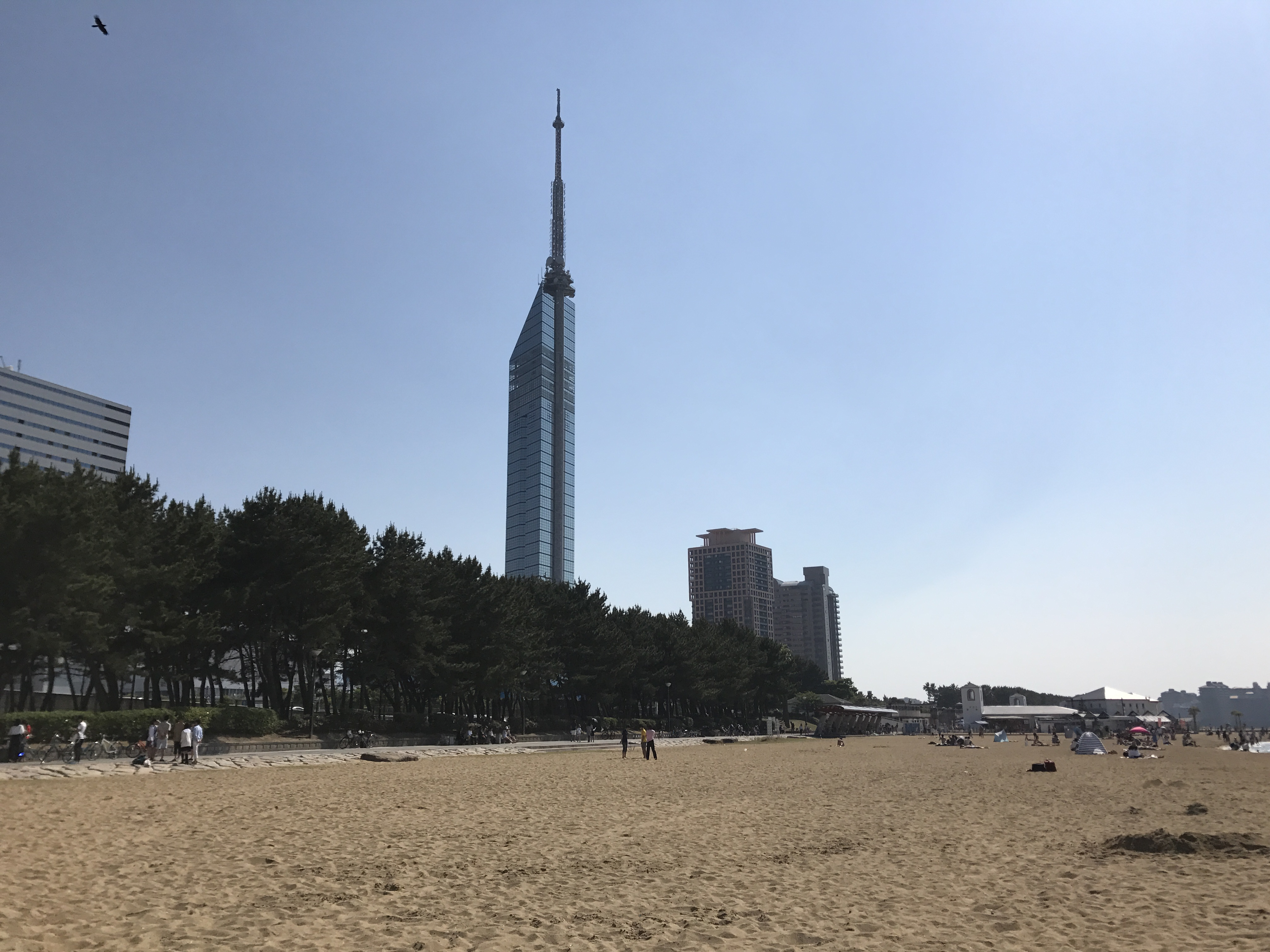
Fukuoka Tower as seen from Seaside Momochi

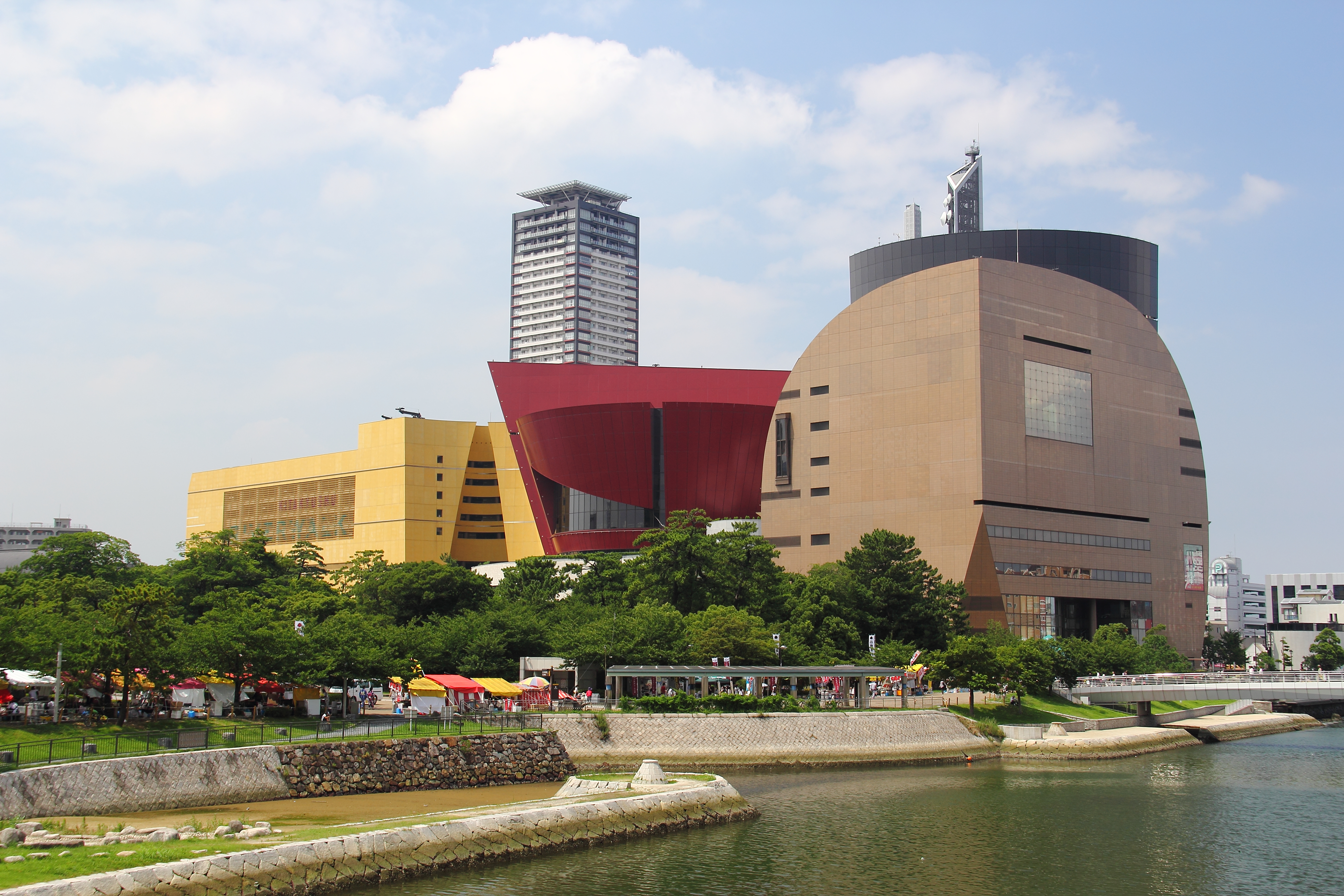
Riverwalk Kitakyushu

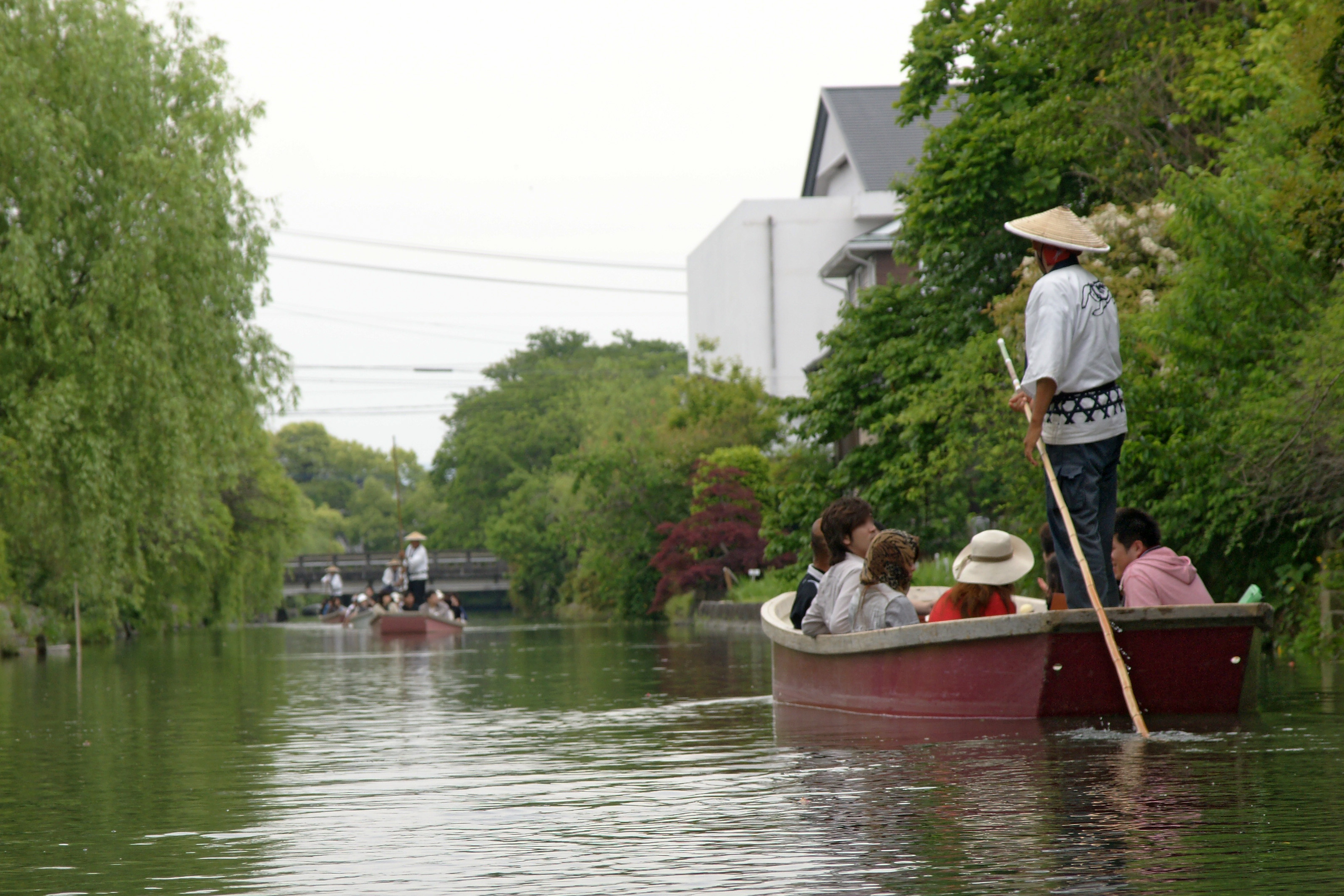
A sightseeing boat in Yanagawa Canal

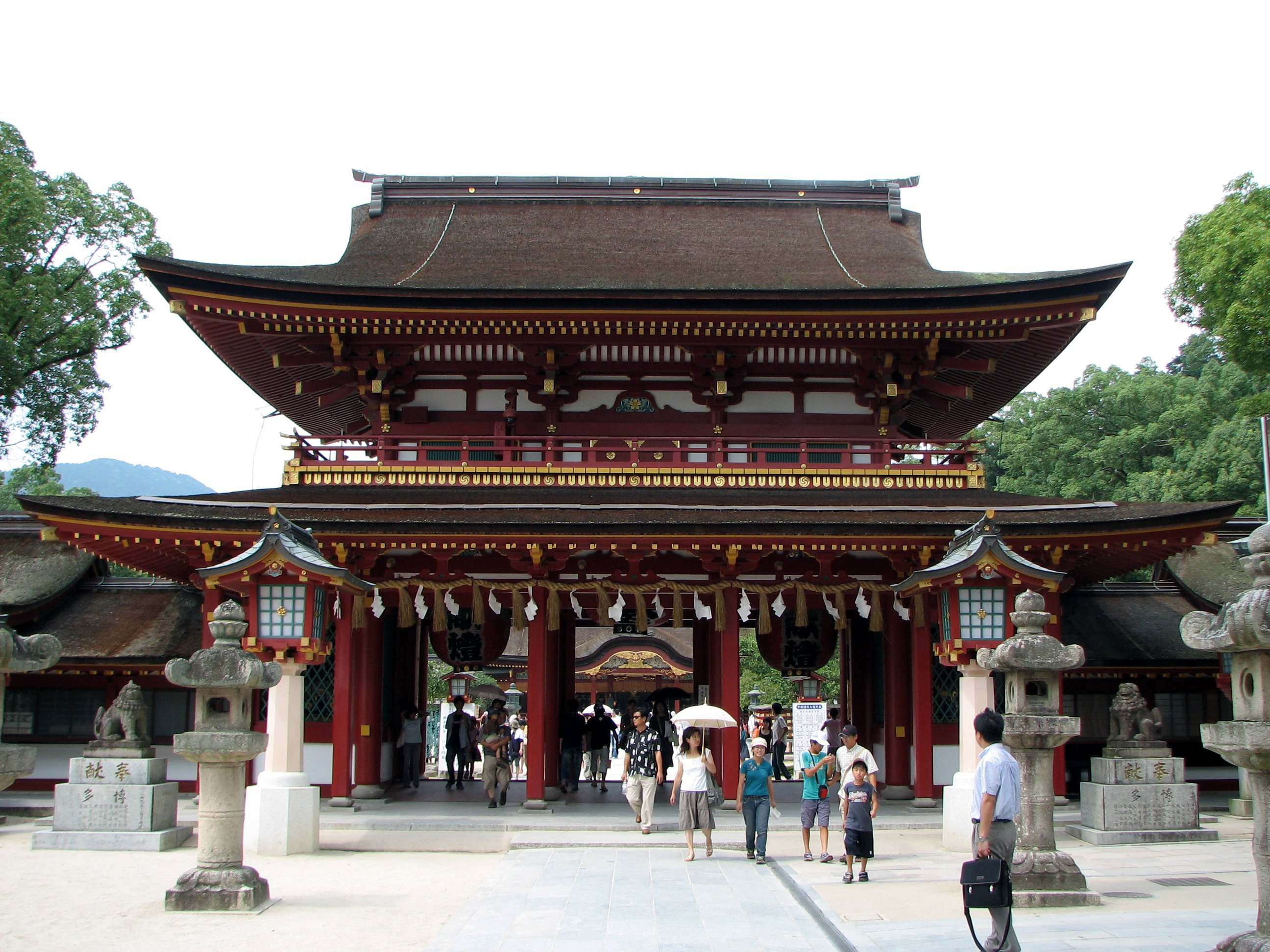
Dazaifu Tenmangū

The most popular place for tourism is Fukuoka City, especially during the Dontaku festival, which attracts millions of visitors from across Japan during Golden Week. Fukuoka is the main shopping, dining, transportation and entertainment hub in Kyushu.

Dazaifu is popular for its many temples and historical sites, as well as the Kyushu National Museum.

Yanagawa is sometimes called "the Venice of Japan" for its boat tours on the abundant, calm rivers that wind through the city.

Kitakyushu features one of the famous night views of Japan from atop Mt. Sarakura, accessible via cablecar. The Mojiko area features waterfront dining, a market, and several preserved historical buildings. The Kanmon Kaikyo Tunnel which connects Kyushu (Moji ward, Kitakyushu) and Honshu (Shimonoseki) is free to walk through. The city center in Kokurakita ward contains the Riverwalk and Itsutsuya shopping complexes, Kokura castle, and the Uomachi Gintengai shopping arcade, the oldest shopping arcade in Japan.

In the "19 best places to visit in 2019" published by the U.S. CNN, Fukuoka Prefecture was chosen as the only destination in Japan.

== Transportation ==
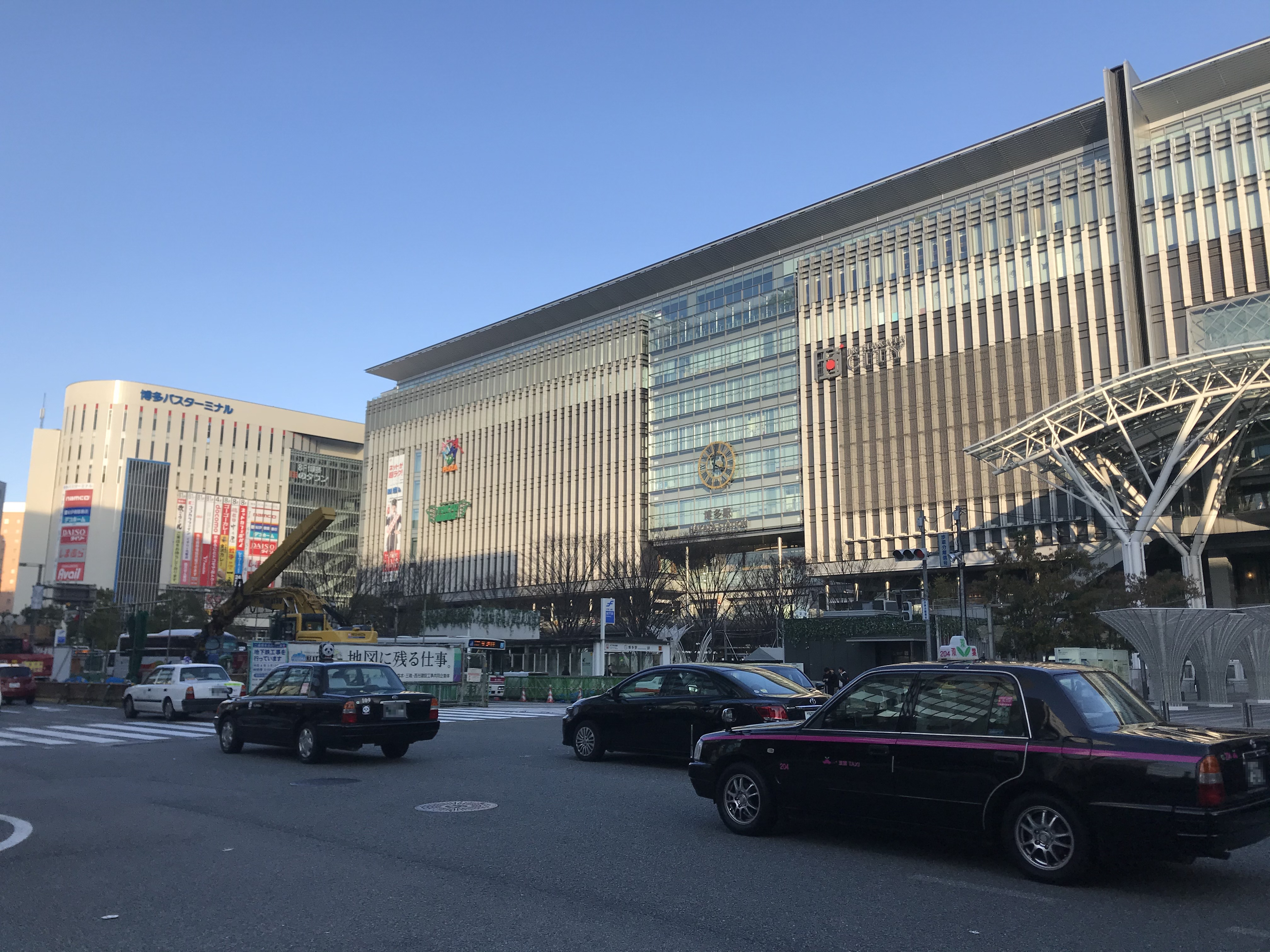
Hakata Station

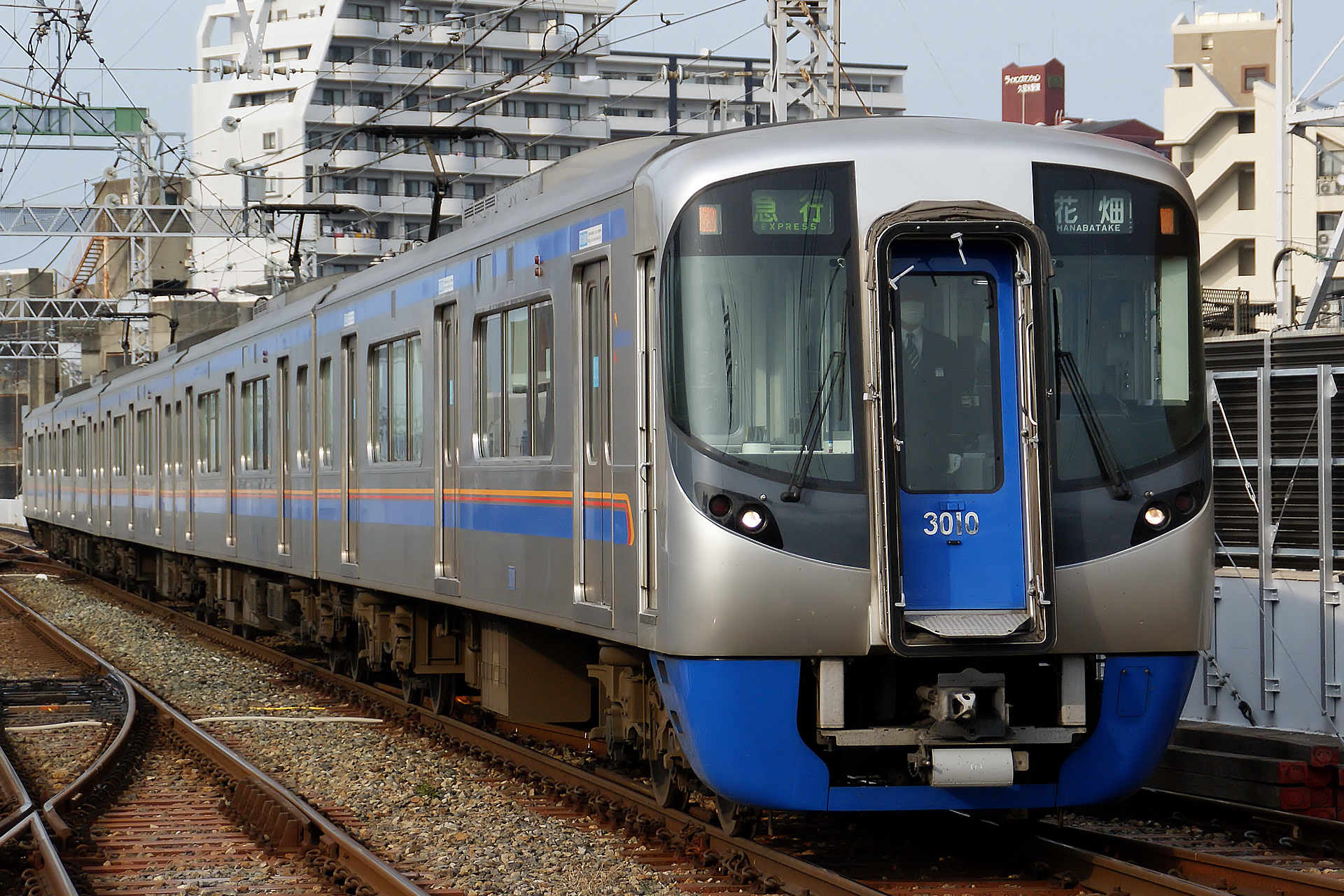
Nishitetsu Tenjin Ōmuta Line

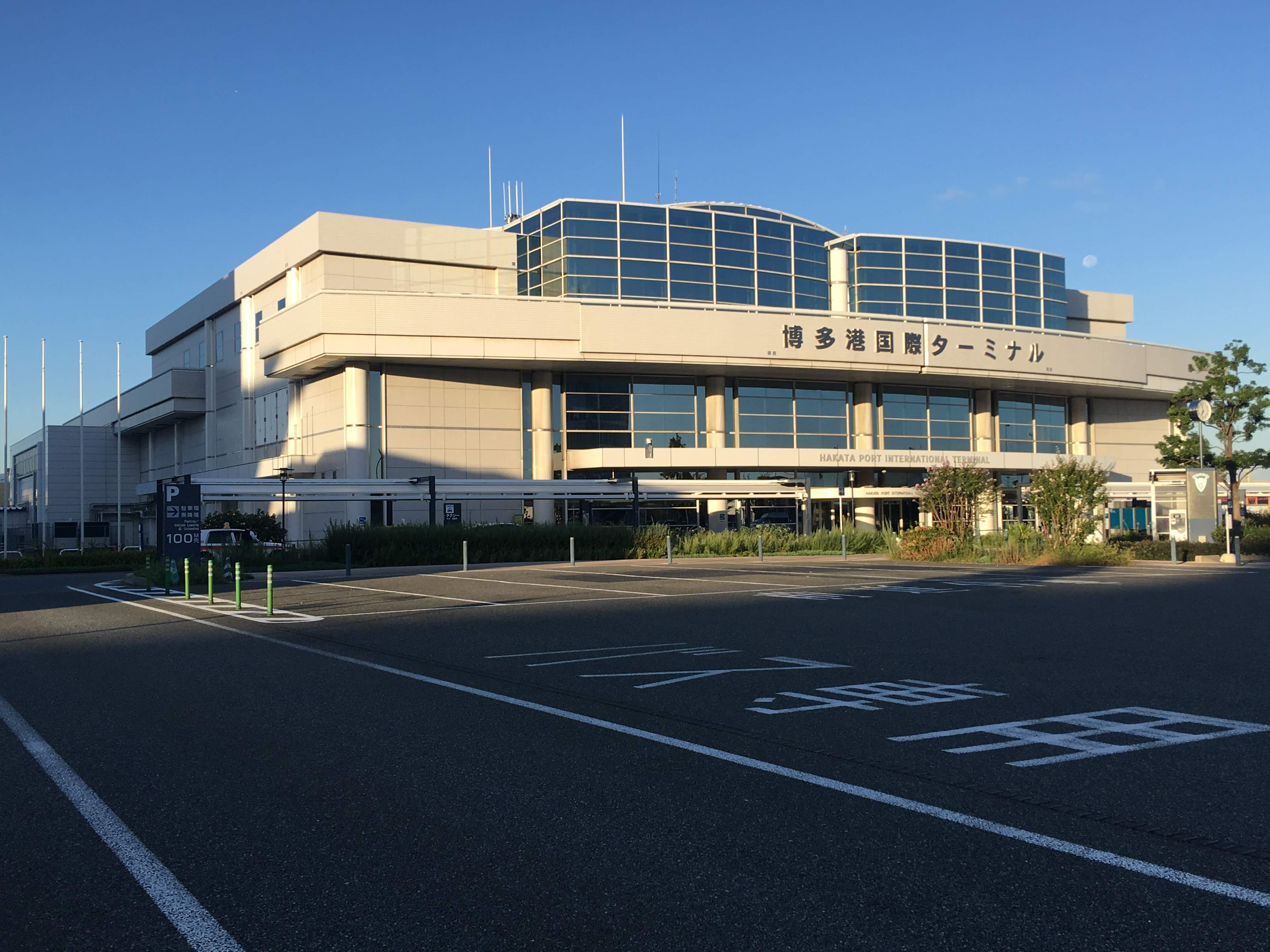
Hakata Ferry Terminal

=== Railway services ===
- Amagi Railway
  - Amagi Railway Amagi Line
- Fukuoka City Subway
  - Airport Line, Hakozaki Line, Nanakuma Line
- Heisei Chikuhō Railway
  - Ita Line, Itota Line, Tagawa Line
  - Coto Coto Train
- JR Kyushu
  - Kyūshū Shinkansen, Kagoshima Main Line, Chikuhō Main Line, Nippō Main Line, Kyudai Main Line
  - Chikuhi Line, Gotōji Line, Kashii Line, Hitahikosan Line, Sasaguri Line
- Kitakyushu Monorail
- Nishi-Nippon Railroad
  - Tenjin Ōmuta Line, Dazaifu Line, Nishitetsu Amagi Line, Kaizuka Line
- West Japan Railway Company(=JR Nishinihon)
  - Sanyō Shinkansen
  - Hakata Minami Line

=== Airports ===
- Fukuoka Airport
- New Kitakyushu airport

== International relations ==
- Bangkok, Thailand
- Delhi, India
- Hawaii, United States
- Hanoi, Vietnam
- Jiangsu Province, People's Republic of China

== General and cited references ==
- Nussbaum, Louis-Frédéric and Käthe Roth (2005). Japan Encyclopedia. Cambridge: Harvard University Press. ISBN 978-0-674-01753-5. OCLC 58053128.
