= List of places of scenic beauty of Japan (Fukuoka) =

This list is of the places of scenic beauty of Japan, located within the Prefecture of Fukuoka.

== National Places of Scenic Beauty ==
As of 1 August 2025, eight Places have been designated at a national level.

Site	Municipality	Comments	Image	Coordinates	Type	Ref.
Former Itō Denemon Family Gardens 旧伊藤傳右エ門氏庭園 kyū-Itō Denemon-shi teien	Iizuka			33°39′43″N 130°41′11″E	1	
Former Kurauchi Family Gardens 旧藏内氏庭園 kyū-Kurauchi-shi teien	Chikujō			33°38′12″N 130°59′40″E	1	
Kiyomizu-dera Honbō Gardens 清水寺本坊庭園; Kiyomizudera Honbō teien	Miyama			33°09′08″N 130°31′09″E	1	
Water Town of Yanagawa 水郷柳河 suikyō Yanagawa	Yanagawa			33°09′31″N 130°23′55″E	3, 10	
Tachibana Family Gardens 立花氏庭園; Tachibana-shi teien	Yanagawa			33°09′29″N 130°23′54″E	1	
Tojima Family Gardens 戸島氏庭園; Tojima-shi teien	Yanagawa			33°09′38″N 130°23′45″E	1	
Mount Hiko Gardens 英彦山庭園; Hikosan teien	Soeda	designation comprises the Former Zasuin Gohonbō Gardens (旧座主院御本坊庭園), Former Zasuin Goshimoya Gardens (旧座主院御下屋庭園), Former Mandokorobō Gardens (旧政所坊庭園), Former Kameishibō Gardens (旧亀石坊庭園), Former Senzōbō Gardens (旧泉蔵坊庭園), Former Kenyōbō Gardens (旧顕揚坊庭園), and Hikosan Jingū Ryoden Gardens (英彦山神宮旅殿庭園)		33°29′05″N 130°54′26″E	1	
Fujie Family Gyoraku-en 藤江氏魚楽園; Fujie-shi Gyoraku-en	Kawasaki			33°33′33″N 130°48′21″E	1	

== Prefectural Places of Scenic Beauty ==
As of 1 May 2024, five Places have been designated at a prefectural level.

Site	Municipality	Comments	Image	Coordinates	Type	Ref.
Shiraito Falls 白糸の滝; Shiraito-no-taki	Itoshima			33°28′50″N 130°10′32″E		
Sakurai Futamigaura 桜井二見ヶ浦; Sakurai Futamigaura	Itoshima			33°38′29″N 130°11′57″E		
Hanagurise - Hanazura Peninsula 鼻栗瀬及び鼻面半島; Hanagurise oyobi Hanazura-hantō	Shingū			33°45′31″N 130°23′04″E		
Kōmyō-ji Gardens 光明寺庭園; Kōmyōji teien	Dazaifu			33°31′06″N 130°32′03″E		
Ishiibō Gardens 石井坊庭園; Ishiibō teien	Sasaguri			33°36′32″N 130°31′39″E		

== Municipal Places of Scenic Beauty ==
As of 1 May 2024, ten Places have been designated at a municipal level, including:

Site	Municipality	Comments	Image	Coordinates	Type	Ref.
Myōfuku-ji Gardens 妙福寺庭園; Myōfukuji teien	Fukuoka			33°31′42″N 130°20′30″E		
Yūsentei Gardens 友泉亭庭園; Yūsentei teien	Fukuoka			33°33′46″N 130°22′35″E		
Ueno Family Gardens 上野家庭園; Ueno-ke teien	Kurume			33°18′29″N 130°35′17″E		
Former Minagi Kuroda Family Gardens 旧三奈木黒田家庭園 kyū-Minagi Kuroda-ke teien	Asakura			33°24′52″N 130°42′47″E		
Yubi-no-Tonogawa 油比の殿川; Yubi-no-Tonogawa	Itoshima			33°34′45″N 130°11′58″E		
Ōzeminō Park 合瀬耳納公園; Ōzeminō kōen	Yame			33°14′46″N 130°46′01″E		
Mount Ike 池の山; Ike-no-yama	Yame			33°14′49″N 130°45′25″E		
Muroyama 室山; Muroyama	Yame			33°15′13″N 130°46′46″E		
Tomarisanyasu Well 泊産安の井戸; Tomarisanyasu-no-ido	Itoshima			33°34′39″N 130°12′11″E		

== Registered Places of Scenic Beauty ==
As of 1 August 2025, three Monuments have been registered (as opposed to designated) as Places of Scenic Beauty at a national level.

Place	Municipality	Comments	Image	Coordinates	Type	Ref.
Ōhori Park 大濠公園; Ōhori kōen	Fukuoka			33°35′10″N 130°22′35″E		
Hirada Family Gardens 平田氏庭園; Hirada-shi teien	Ogori			33°23′47″N 130°33′20″E		
Former Hōzankaku Gardens (Former Tagawa Ryokan) 旧豊山閣庭園(旧旅館田川) kyū-Hōzankaku teien (kyū-ryokan Tagawa)	Kitakyūshū					

== See also ==
- Cultural Properties of Japan
- List of parks and gardens of Fukuoka Prefecture
- List of Historic Sites of Japan (Fukuoka Prefecture)
