= Kawara (disambiguation) =

Kawara may refer to:

== Places ==
- Kawara, Fukuoka

== People ==
- On Kawara, Japanese artist
- Riki Kawara, Japanese politician

== See also ==
- Kawara Museum
- Kawara Station
