= Ippommatsu Station (Fukuoka) =

Railway station in Kawara, Fukuoka Prefecture, Japan

JI 12 Ippommatsu Station 一本松駅
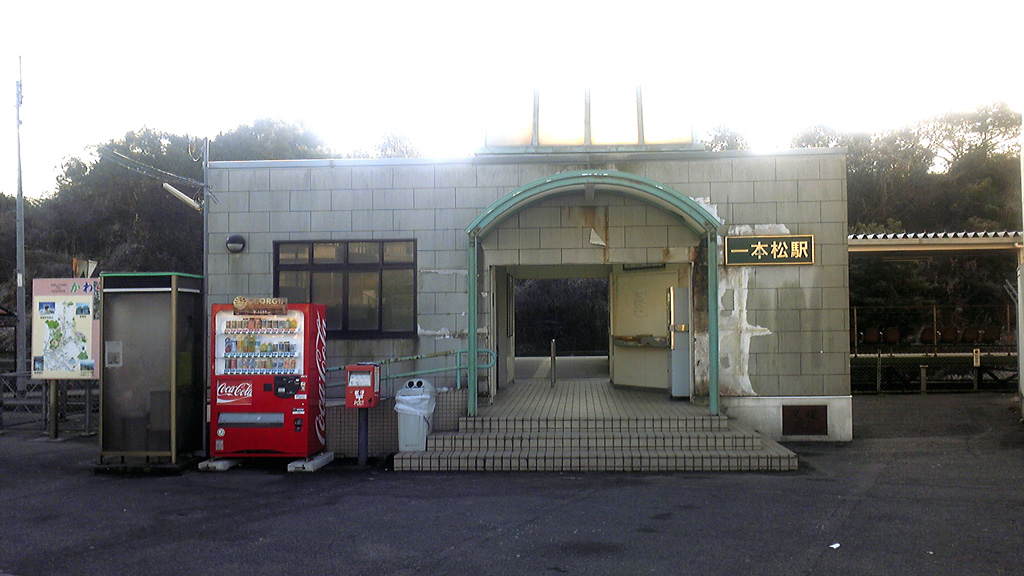
- Ippommatsu Station in January 2009

General information
- Location: 1805-2 Nakatsubaru, Kawara-machi, Tagawa-gun, Fukuoka-ken 822-1405; Japan
- Coordinates: 33°39′21″N 130°50′07″E
- Operator: JR Kyushu
- Line: JI Hitahikosan Line
- Distance: 25.0 km from Jōno
- Platforms: 1 side platform
- Tracks: 1

Other information
- Status: Unstaffed
- Station code: JI12
- Website: Official website

History
- Opened: 22 March 1997

Passengers
- FY2019: 317 daily

Services
Preceding station	JR Kyushu	Following station
Tagawa-Ita towards Yoake	Hitahikosan Line	Kawara towards Kokura
Location
- Location within Fukuoka Prefecture Location within Japan

Ippommatsu Station (一本松駅, Ipponmatsu-eki) is a passenger railway station located in the town of Kawara, Fukuoka Prefecture, Japan. It is operated by JR Kyushu.

== Lines ==
The station is served by the Hitahikosan Line and is located 25.0 km from the starting point of the line at Jōno. One train per hour stops at the station during the daytime, increased to two per hour during the morning and evening peaks.

== Layout ==
The station consists of one side platform serving a single bi-directional track. The station is unattended.

== History ==
The station opened on 22 March 1997.

== Passenger statistics ==
In fiscal 2019, there was a daily average of 317 boarding passengers at this station.。

== Surrounding area ==
- Magarikane Station (Heisei Chikuhō Railway Tagawa Line)
- Fukuoka Prefectural Tagawa High School

== See also ==
- Ippommatsu Station (Saitama) in Saitama Prefecture
- List of railway stations in Japan
