= Matsuyama Station =

Matsuyama Station is the name of multiple train stations in Japan.

- Matsuyama Station (Ehime) - (松山駅) in Ehime Prefecture
- Matsuyama Station (Fukuoka) - (松山駅) in Fukuoka Prefecture
