= Hōjō Coal Mine Disaster =

1914 mine explosion in Japan

Hojyo Coal Mine Disaster
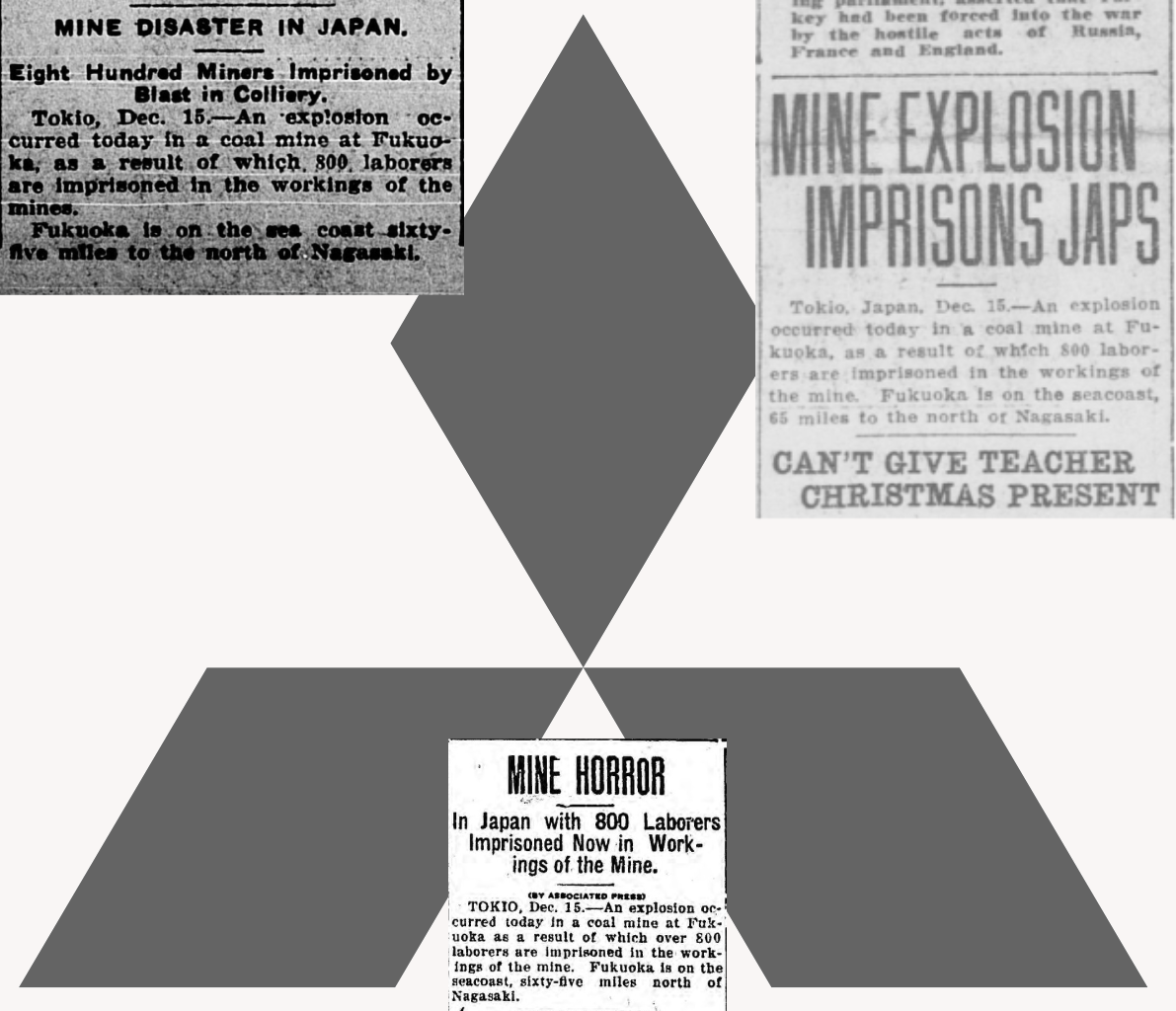
- American news coverage of the disaster
- Date: December 15, 1914; 111 years ago
- Location: Mitsubishi Hōjō Coal Mine; 33°41′N 130°47′E
- Cause: Coal Mine explosion
- Casualties: 687-1000 (Note: Different sources give different death tolls: 680 686 Orii adumbrates report that Mitsubishi may have tried to cover up the actual death toll which in reality could have been as high as 1000 miners killed)

The Mitsubishi Hōjō mine disaster occurred December 15, 1914, in Kyushu, Japan. A gas explosion at the Hōjō (Hojyo) coal mine killed 687. It is the worst mining accident in Japanese history.

== Mine details ==
Mitsubishi formally opened the Hōjō mine in 1908. It was the seventh mine in an elaborate network of mines known as the Mitsubishi Chikuho coalfield. The mine was a shaft mine that pioneered deep shaft mining in Japan and was one of the deeper mines of its day, at parts it was 295 feet (90 m) deep.

== Explosion ==
On December 15, 1914 coal dust and methane gas mixed together in the air until some sort of spark set off a giant explosion. The blast sent the mine shaft cage, used to take miners in and out of the mine, flying out of the mine shaft.

After the explosion, the owners of mine cut up hundreds of oranges and tossed them down the shaft thinking that the citrus would negate the poison gas fumes. As the rescuers went down into the mine they "Each held a summer orange in their mouth and went down breathing only through their noses" under the same belief. After a short while to prevent the fire from spreading underground and destroying valuable coal the mine's entrances were sealed to put out the fire but as a result, also killing anyone who survived the initial explosion underground. As with most Japanese mines the wives worked with their husbands and an estimated 20% of those killed were women.

== Deaths by mine sector ==
Deaths by mine sector location.

Sector	Deaths
Left Nogi Ascent	112
Right Mata Descent area	250
New Oyama Fourth Descent area	60
Second New Kuroki Descent	88
Second New Mata, Right Slope	70
Ditto, Left No.3 Descent	50
Third New Mata Descent	50

== Bibliography ==
Notes

References

- Burton, W. Donald (2014). Coal-Mining Women in Japan: Heavy Burdens. Routledge. ISBN 9781317800422. - Total pages: 256
- Cleveland, Cutler J.; Morris, Christopher G. (2013). Handbook of Energy: Chronologies, Top Ten Lists, and Word Clouds. Elsevier. ISBN 9780124170193. - Total pages: 968
- Walker, Brett L. (2011). Toxic Archipelago: A History of Industrial Disease in Japan. University of Washington Press. ISBN 9780295803012. - Total pages: 352
