= Itoda Station =

Railway station in Itoda, Fukuoka Prefecture, Japan

Itoda Station 糸田駅
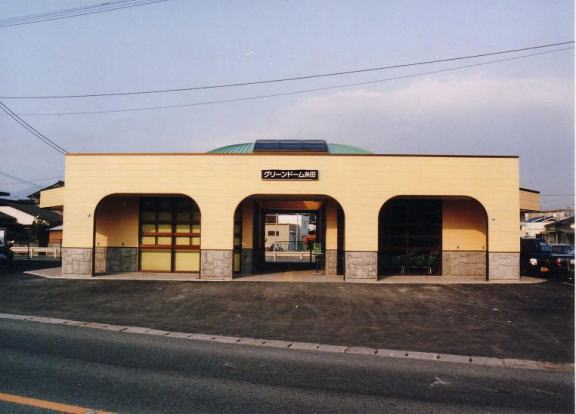
- Station entrance

General information
- Location: 3721-4 Itoda, Itoda-cho, Tagawa-gun, Fukuoka-ken 822-1300; Japan
- Coordinates: 33.6568°N 130.7855°E
- Operator: Heisei Chikuhō Railway
- Line: ■ Itoda Line
- Distance: 3.4 km (from Kanada Station)
- Platforms: 1 side platform

Construction
- Structure type: At-grade

Other information
- Status: Unstaffed
- Station code: HC53
- Website: Official website

History
- Opened: 20 October 1897
- Former names: Miyatoko (to 1943)

Services
Preceding station	Heisei Chikuhō Railway	Following station
Matsuyama towards Kanada	Itoda Line	Ōyabu towards Tagawa-Gotōji
Location
- Location within Fukuoka Prefecture Location within Japan

Itoda Station (糸田駅, Itoda-eki) is a passenger railway station located in the town of Itoda, Fukuoka Prefecture, Japan. It is operated by the third-sector railway operator Heisei Chikuhō Railway.

== Lines ==
Itoda Station is served by the Itoda Line and is located 3.4 km from the starting point of the line at Kanada. Trains arrive roughly every hour.

== Layout ==
The station consists of one side platform serving a single bi-directional track. The station is unattended.

== History ==
The station opened on 20 October 1897 as Miyatoko Station (宮床駅, Miyatoko-eki) on the Hōshū Railway. The railway merged with the Kyushu Railway in 1901 and was nationalized in 1907. It was renamed on 1 July 1943. With the privatization of the JNR on 1 April 1987, the station came under the control of JR Kyushu. The Ita Line was transferred to the Heisei Chikuhō Railway on 1 October 1989.

== Surrounding area ==
The station is located along the right bank of the Nakamotoji River in the eastern part of the town, just across the Minazoe Bridge. The housing complex is spread out from the east of the station to the northeast. It is about 900 meters away from the town hall,

- Itoda Town Hall
- Itoda Town Itoda Elementary School
- Itoda Town Itoda Junior High School

== See also ==
- List of railway stations in Japan
