= Genjiinomori Station =

Railway station in Aka, Fukuoka Prefecture, Japan

Genjiinomori Station 源じいの森駅
- Genjiinomori Station in August 2026

General information
- Location: 6933-2 Aka, Aka-mura, Tagawa-gun, Fukuoka-ken 824-0431; Japan
- Coordinates: 33.6161°N 130.8957°E
- Operator: Heisei Chikuhō Railway
- Line: ■ Tagawa Line
- Distance: 15.8 km (from Yukuhashi Station)
- Platforms: 1 side platform

Construction
- Structure type: At-grade

Other information
- Status: Unstaffed
- Station code: HC22
- Website: Official website

History
- Opened: 21 July 1995

Services
Preceding station	Heisei Chikuhō Railway	Following station
Sakiyama towards Yukuhashi	Tagawa Line	Yusubaru towards Tagawa-Ita
Location
- Location within Fukuoka Prefecture Location within Japan

Genjiinomori Station (源じいの森駅, Genjiinomori-eki) is a passenger railway station located in the village of Aka, Fukuoka Prefecture, Japan. It is operated by the third-sector railway operator Heisei Chikuhō Railway.

== Lines ==
Genjiinomori Station is served by the Tagawa and is located 15.8 km from the starting point of the line at Yukuhashi. Trains arrive roughly every 30 minutes.

== Layout ==
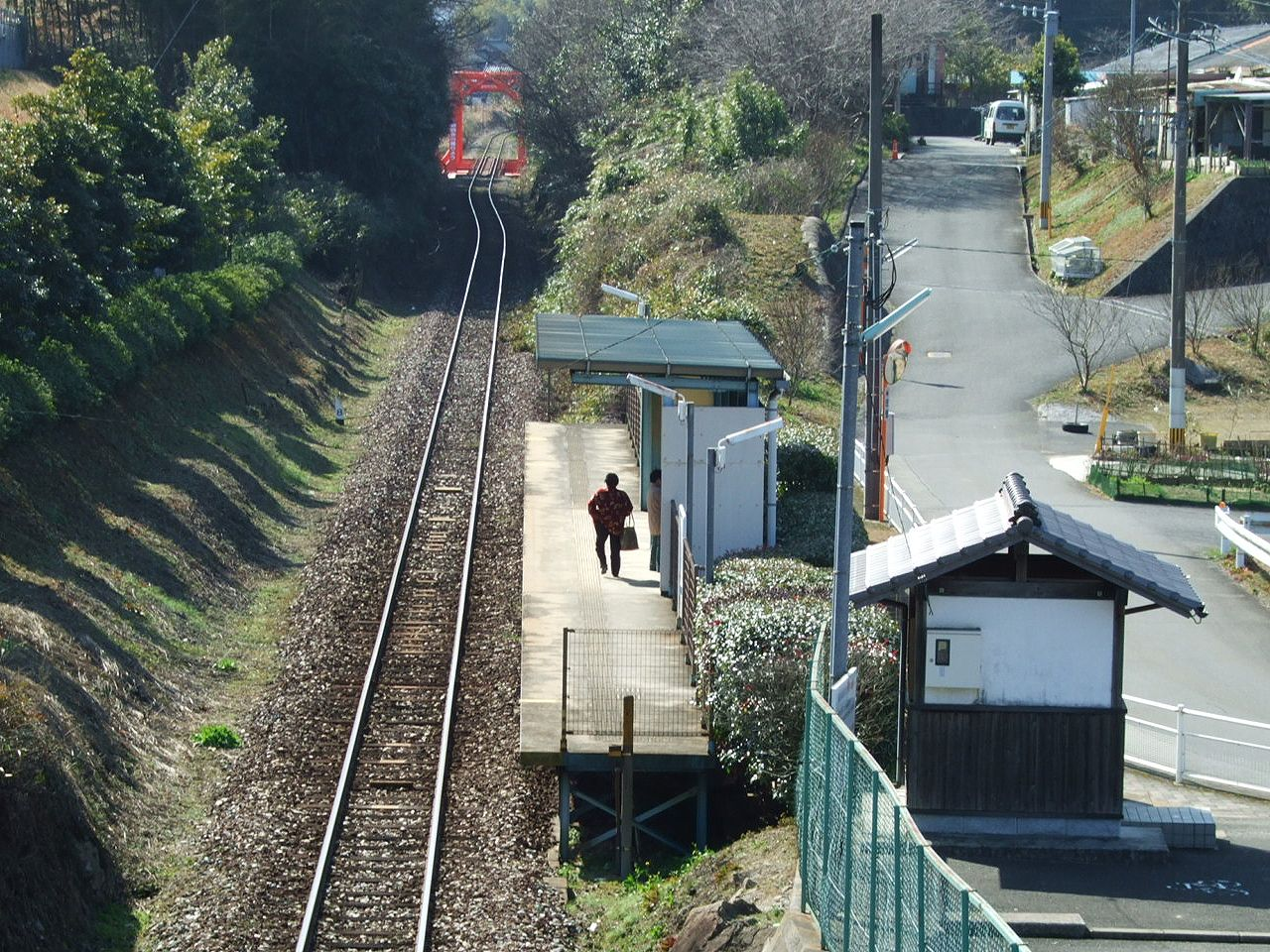
Aerial view of station platform

The station consists of one side platforms serving a single bi-directional track. There is no station building, but only a shelter on the platform. The station is unattended.

== History ==
Genjiinomori Station opened on 21 July 1985.

== Surrounding area ==
- Genjiinomori Onsen

== See also ==
- List of railway stations in Japan
