= Ōtō, Fukuoka =

Ōtō 大任町
- Town
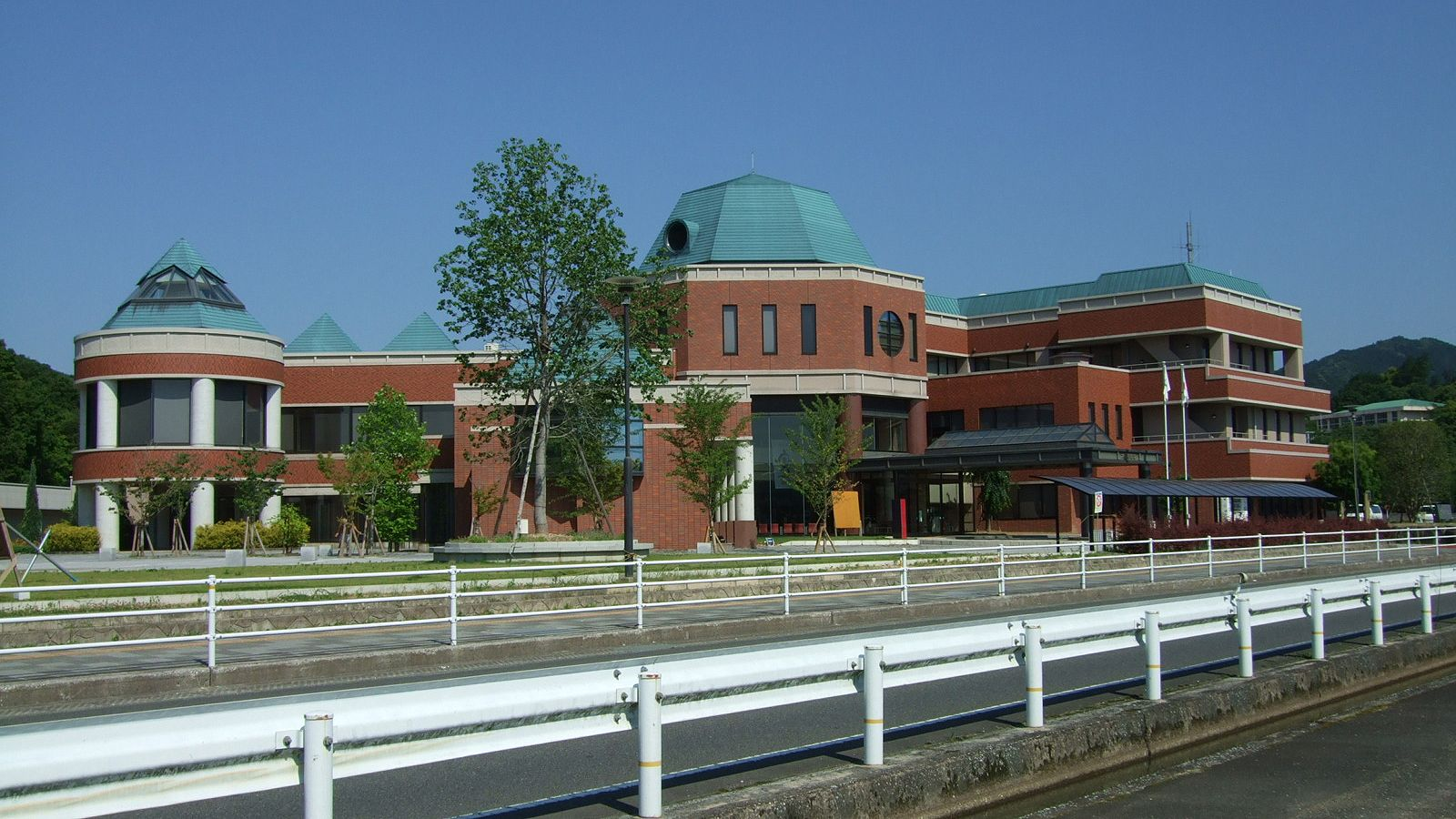
- Miyako Town hall

- Flag Seal
- Location of Ōtō in Fukuoka Prefecture

- Location in Japan
- Coordinates: 33°36′44″N 130°51′13″E
- Country: Japan
- Region: Kyushu
- Prefecture: Fukuoka
- District: Tagawa

Area
  - Total: 14.26 km^{2} (5.51 sq mi)

Population (November 30, 2023)
  - Total: 5,066
  - Density: 355.3/km^{2} (920.1/sq mi)
- Time zone: UTC+09:00 (JST)
- City hall address: 3067 Daijichi, Oto-cho, Tagawa-gun, Fukuoka-ken 824-0512
- Website: Official website
- Symbols
- Bird: Warbling white-eye
- Flower: Brassica rapa, Camellia japonica
- Tree: Pine

Ōtō (大任町, Ōtō-machi) is a town located in Tagawa District, Fukuoka Prefecture, Japan. As of 30 November 2023, the town had an estimated population of 5,066 in 2615 households, and a population density of 360 persons per km^{2}. The total area of the town is 151.34 km^{2} (58.43 sq mi). The town is known for its small, palm-sized mangoes.

== Geography ==
Ōtō is located in the Chikuho region of northeastern of Fukuoka Prefecture. The Hikoyama River flowing from north to south through the center of the town, and much of the town belongs to the Tagawa Basin.

=== Neighboring municipalities ===
Fukuoka Prefecture

- Aka
- Kawara
- Kawasaki
- Soeda
- Tagawa

=== Climate ===
Ōtō has a humid subtropical climate (Köppen Cfa) characterized by warm summers and cool winters with light to no snowfall.

=== Demographics ===
Per Japanese census data, the population of Ōtō is as shown below

Historical population
Year	Pop.	±%
1940	7,149	—
1950	8,596	+20.2%
1960	8,940	+4.0%
1970	6,256	−30.0%
1980	6,653	+6.3%
1990	6,628	−0.4%
2000	5,943	−10.3%
2010	5,176	−12.9%
2020	5,008	−3.2%

== History ==
The area of Ōtō was part of ancient Buzen Province and part of the holdings of Kokura Domain in the Edo Period. The village of Ōtō was established on May 1, 1889, with the creation of the modern municipalities system. It was raised to town status on January 1, 1960.

== Government ==
Ōtō has a mayor-council form of government with a directly elected mayor and a unicameral town council of 11 members. Ōtō, collectively with the other municipalities of Tagawa District contributes two members to the Fukuoka Prefectural Assembly. In terms of national politics, the town is part of the Fukuoka 11th district of the lower house of the Diet of Japan. The town mayor and government has frequently been involved in scandals involving corruption, fraud, and violent crime with frequent accusations of ties with organized crime.

== Economy ==
During the Meiji period, Ōtō, along with the other municipalities of the Chikuho area, developed with the Kitakyushu industrial zone through coal mining, and is still considered part of to the Greater Kitakyushu Metropolitan Area. However, as the demand for coal decreased due to the energy revolution, the coal mines that had sponsored prosperity have all closed, leading to depopulation.

== Education ==
Ōtō has two public elementary schools and one public junior high school operated by the town government. The town does not have a high school.

== Transportation ==
=== Railways ===
Ōtō has had no passenger railway service since the closure of the Soeda Line in 1985. The nearest train station is Tagawa-Ita Station in neighboring Tagawa.

=== Highways ===
There are no expressways or national highways in the town.
