= Kanada, Fukuoka =

Dissolved municipality in Fukuoka prefecture, Japan

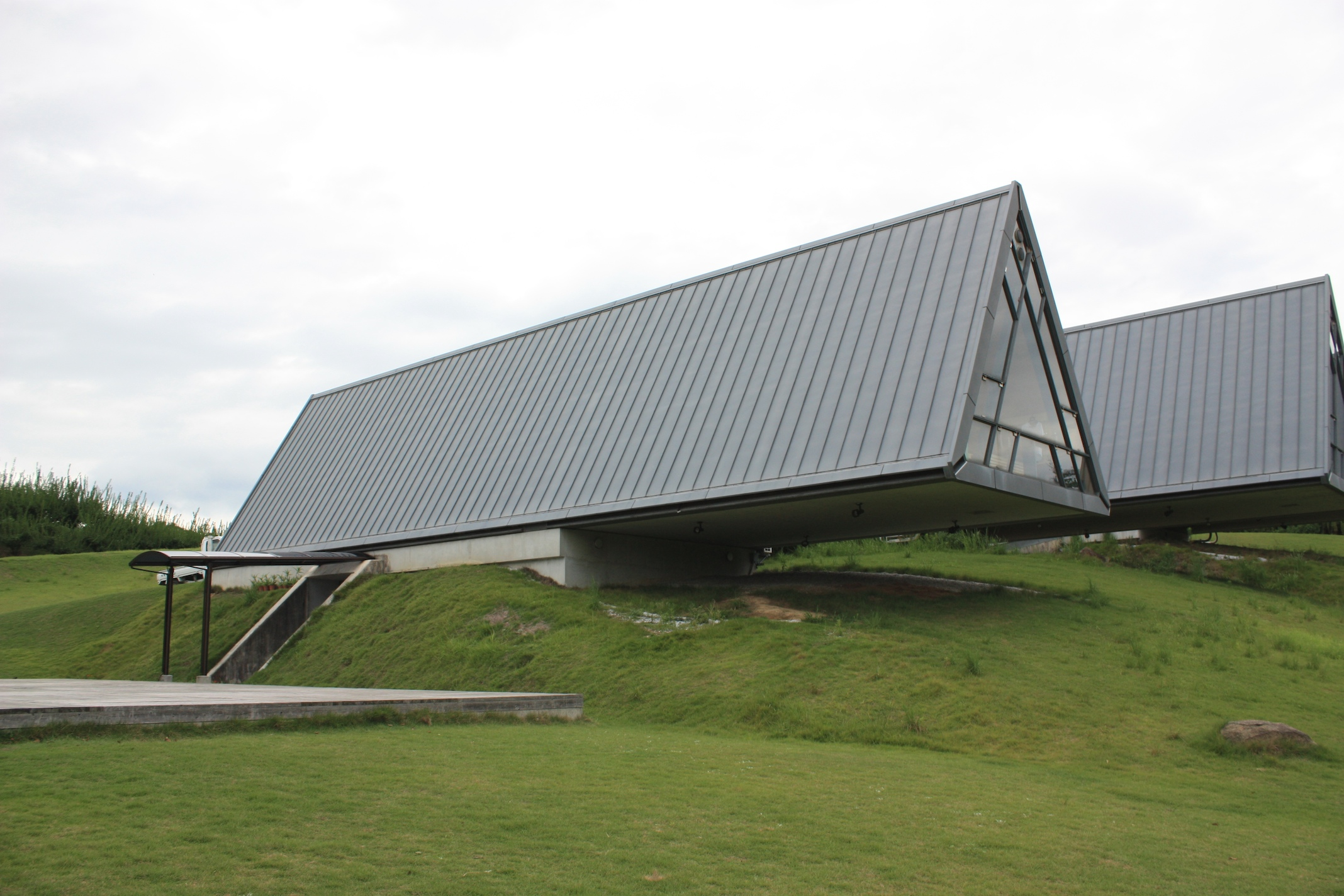
Notable house located in the former Kanada

Kanada (金田町, Kanada-machi) was a town located in Tagawa District, Fukuoka Prefecture, Japan.

As of 2003, the town had an estimated population of 8,285 and a density of 1,110.59 persons per km^{2}. The total area was 7.46 km^{2}.

On March 6, 2006, Kanada was merged with the towns of Akaike and Hōjō (all from Tagawa District) to create the town of Fukuchi.
