= Itoda, Fukuoka =

Itoda 糸田町
- Town
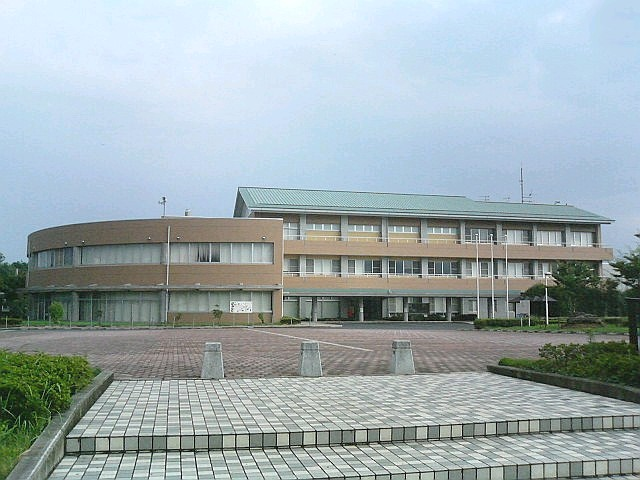
- Itoda Town Office

- Flag Emblem
- Interactive map of Itoda
- Location in Japan
- Coordinates: 33°39′10″N 130°46′44″E
- Country: Japan
- Region: Kyushu
- Prefecture: Fukuoka
- District: Tagawa

Area
  - Total: 8.04 km^{2} (3.10 sq mi)

Population (December 31, 2023)
  - Total: 8,448
  - Density: 1,050/km^{2} (2,720/sq mi)
- Time zone: UTC+09:00 (JST)
- City hall address: 1975-1 Itoda-cho, Tagawa-gun, Fukuoka-ken 822-1392
- Website: Official website

Itoda (糸田町, Itoda-machi) is a town located in Tagawa District, Fukuoka Prefecture, Japan. As of 31 December 2023, the town had an estimated population of 8448 in 4581 households, and a population density of 830 persons per km^{2}. The total area of the town is 8.04 km^{2} (3.10 sq mi).

== Geography ==
Itoda is located almost in the center of Fukuoka Prefecture, in the northeastern part of the Chikuho region, approximately 50 kilometers east of Fukuoka City, approximately 40 kilometers southwest of Kitakyushu City, approximately 10 kilometers east of Iizuka City, and approximately halfway between Iizuka City and Tagawa City. The eastern part of the town is a basin, which is the urban center. The western part of the town contains mountainous region called Karasuo Pass, which was the border area connecting former Chikuzen Province and Buzen Province.

=== Neighboring municipalities ===
Fukuoka Prefecture

- Fukuchi
- Iizuka
- Tagawa

=== Climate ===
Itoda has a humid subtropical climate (Köppen Cfa) characterized by warm summers and cool winters with light to no snowfall. The average annual temperature in Itoda is 15.5 °C. The average annual rainfall is 1560 mm with September as the wettest month. The temperatures are highest on average in August, at around 26.7 °C, and lowest in January, at around 4.7 °C.

=== Demographics ===
Per Japanese census data, the population of Itoda is as shown below

Historical population
Year	Pop.	±%
1940	15,428	—
1950	16,375	+6.1%
1960	12,398	−24.3%
1970	9,876	−20.3%
1980	10,872	+10.1%
1990	11,308	+4.0%
2000	10,469	−7.4%
2010	9,621	−8.1%
2020	8,407	−12.6%

== History ==
The area of Itoda was part of ancient Buzen Province. During the Edo Period the area was partly under the control of Kokura Domain. After the Meiji restoration, the villages of Itoda was established on May 1, 1889, with the creation of the modern municipalities system. It was raised to town status on January 1, 1939.

== Government ==
Itoda has a mayor-council form of government with a directly elected mayor and a unicameral town council of 12 members. Itoda, collectively with the other municipalities of Tagawa District contributes two members to the Fukuoka Prefectural Assembly. In terms of national politics, the town is part of the Fukuoka 11th district of the lower house of the Diet of Japan.

== Economy ==
During the Meiji period, Itoda, along with the other municipalities of the Chikuho area, developed with the Kitakyushu industrial zone through coal mining, and is still considered part of to the Greater Kitakyushu Metropolitan Area. However, as the demand for coal decreased due to the energy revolution, the coal mines that had sponsored prosperity have closed, leading to depopulation. Since the 1970s, efforts have been made to maintain the economic base by creating industrial parks on former sites such as coal mines. In addition, horticultural crops such as roses, orchids, strawberries, and cherry tomatoes are cultivated, and wooden crafts are produced as special products.

== Education ==
Itoda has one public elementary school and one public junior high school operated by the town government. The town does not have a high school.

== Transportation ==
=== Railways ===
Heisei Chikuhō Railway - Itoda Line

■ Buzen-Ōkuma - Matsuyama - Itoda

=== Highways ===
- Kyushu Expressway
- Higashikyushu Expressway
- National Route 201

== Notable people from Itoda ==
- Masurao Hiroo, sumo wrestler
