= Buzen-Ōkuma Station =

Railway station in Itoda, Fukuoka Prefecture, Japan

Buzen-Ōkuma Station 豊前大熊駅
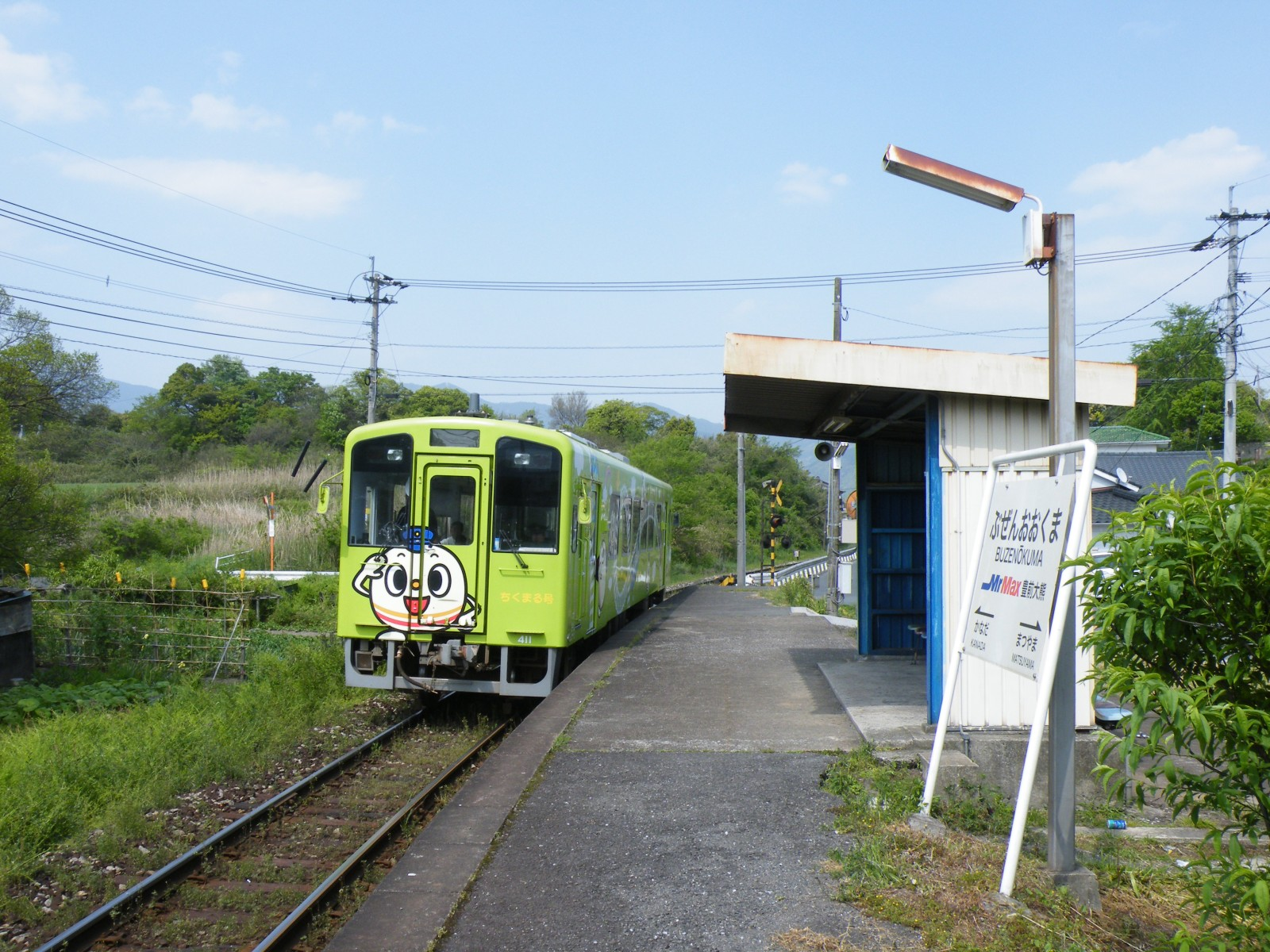
- A Heisei Chikuhō 400-series train at Buzen-Ōkuma Station

General information
- Other names: MrMax Buzen-Ōkuma Station
- Location: 4097-2 Itoda, Itoda-cho, Tagawa-gun, Fukuoka-ken 822-1300; Japan
- Coordinates: 33.6727°N 130.7807°E
- Operator: Heisei Chikuhō Railway
- Line: ■ Itoda Line
- Distance: 1.5 km (from Kanada Station)
- Platforms: 1 side platform

Construction
- Structure type: At-grade

Other information
- Status: Unstaffed
- Station code: HC51
- Website: Official website

History
- Opened: 1 October 1942

Services
Preceding station	Heisei Chikuhō Railway	Following station
Kanada Terminus	Itoda Line	Matsuyama towards Tagawa-Gotōji
Location
- Location within Fukuoka Prefecture Location within Japan

Buzen-Ōkuma Station (豊前大熊駅, Buzen-Ōkuma-eki) is a passenger railway station located in the town of Itoda, Fukuoka Prefecture, Japan. It is operated by the third-sector railway operator Heisei Chikuhō Railway. On 1 April 2009, discount shop chain MrMax acquired naming rights to the station. Therefore, the station is alternatively known as MrMax Buzen-Ōkuma Station (MrMax豊前大熊駅, Misutā-Makkusu-Buzen-Ōkuma-eki).

== Lines ==
Buzen-Ōkuma Station is served by the Itoda Line and is located 1.5 km from the starting point of the line at Kanada. Trains arrive roughly every hour.

== Layout ==
The station consists of one side platform serving a single bi-directional track. The station is unattended.

== History ==
The station opened on1 October 1942 as a station on the Industrial Cement Railway. The railway was nationalized in 1943. With the privatization of the JNR on 1 April 1987, the station came under the control of JR Kyushu. The Ita Line was transferred to the Heisei Chikuhō Railway on 1 October 1989.

== Surrounding area ==
- Fukuoka Prefectural Route 420 Kaneda Itotagawa Line

== See also ==
- List of railway stations in Japan
