= Tagawa District, Fukuoka =

District in Fukuoka prefecture, Japan

Coordinates: 33.627°N 130.858°E

Location of Tagawa District in Fukuoka Prefecture

Tagawa (田川郡, Tagawa-gun) is a district located in Fukuoka Prefecture, Japan.

As of 2020, the district has an estimated population of 71,755 and a density of 232.1 persons per km^{2}. The total area is 309.13 km^{2}.

== Towns and villages ==
- Aka
- Fukuchi
- Itoda
- Kawara
- Kawasaki
- Ōtō
- Soeda

== Merger history ==
On March 6, 2006, the following towns merged to form the new town of Fukuchi:

- Akaike
- Kanada
- Hōjō
