= Ōyabu Station =

Railway station in Tagawa, Fukuoka Prefecture, Japan

Ōyabu Station 大藪駅
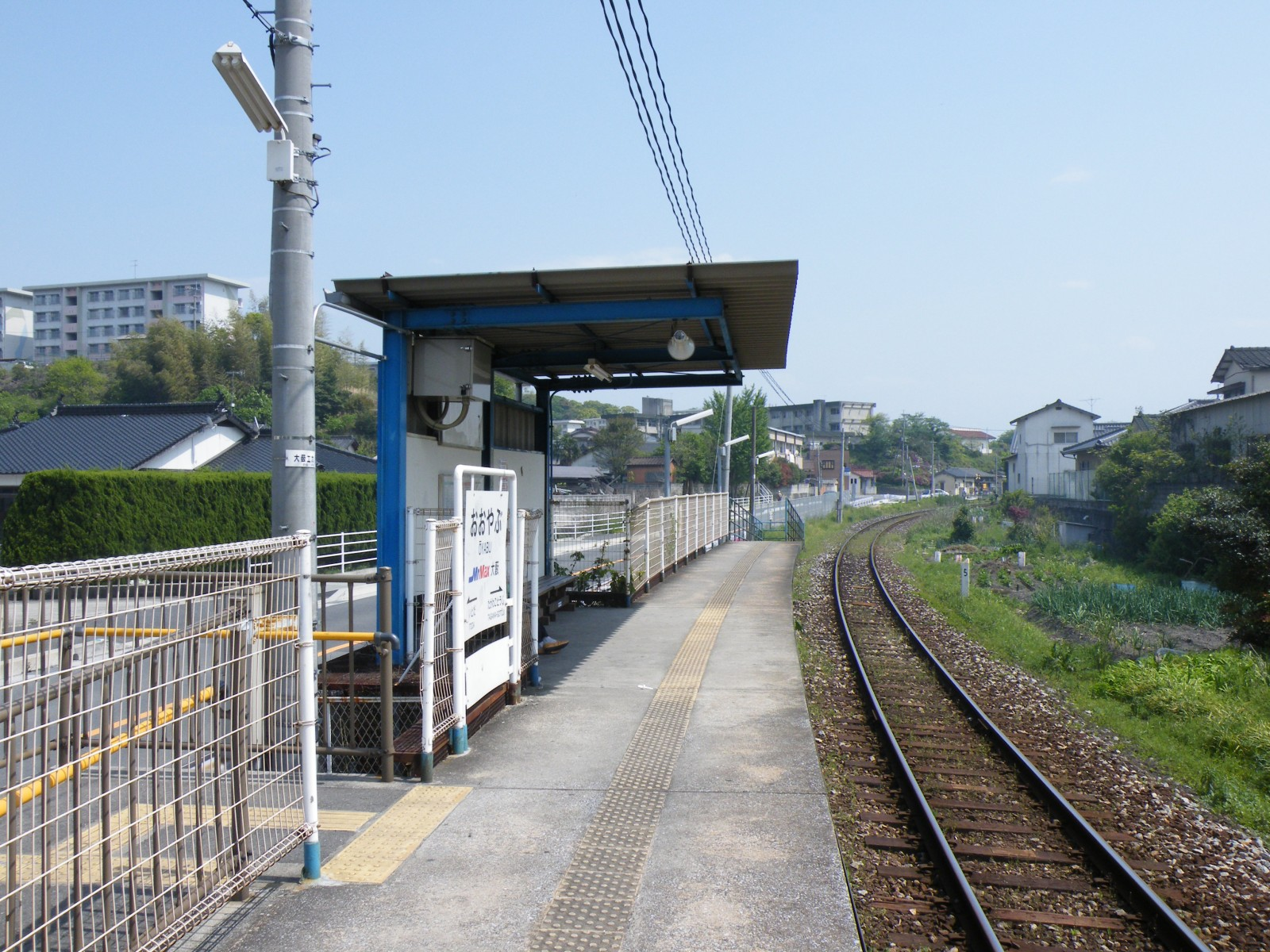
- Station platform

General information
- Other names: MrMax Ōyabu Station
- Location: 1457-2 Kawamiya, Tagawa-shi, Fukuoka-ken 826-0042; Japan
- Coordinates: 33.6473°N 130.7976°E
- Operator: Heisei Chikuhō Railway
- Line: ■ Itoda Line
- Distance: 4.9 km (from Kanada Station)
- Platforms: 1 side platform

Construction
- Structure type: At-grade

Other information
- Status: Unstaffed
- Station code: HC54
- Website: Official website

History
- Opened: 1 October 1990

Passengers
- FY2019: 258 daily

Services
Preceding station	Heisei Chikuhō Railway	Following station
Itoda towards Kanada	Itoda Line	Tagawa-Gotōji Terminus
Location
- Location within Fukuoka Prefecture Location within Japan

Ōyabu Station (大藪駅, Ōyabu-eki) is a passenger railway station located in the city of Tagawa, Fukuoka Prefecture, Japan. It is operated by the third-sector railway operator Heisei Chikuhō Railway. On 1 April 2009, discount shop chain MrMax acquired naming rights to the station. Therefore, the station is alternatively known as MrMax Ōyabu Station (MrMax大藪駅, Misutā-Makkusu-Ōyabu-eki).

== Lines ==
Ōyabu Station is served by the Itoda Line and is located 4.9 km from the starting point of the line at Kanada. Trains arrive roughly every hour.

== Layout ==
The station consists of one side platform serving a single bi-directional track. There is no station building, but only a shelter on the platform. Entry to the station consists of ramps that connect to a parallel road east of the station. The station is unattended.

== History ==
The station opened on 1 October 1990.

== Surrounding area ==
- Tagawa City Oyabu Elementary School

== See also ==
- List of railway stations in Japan
