= Aka, Fukuoka =

Aka 赤村
- Village
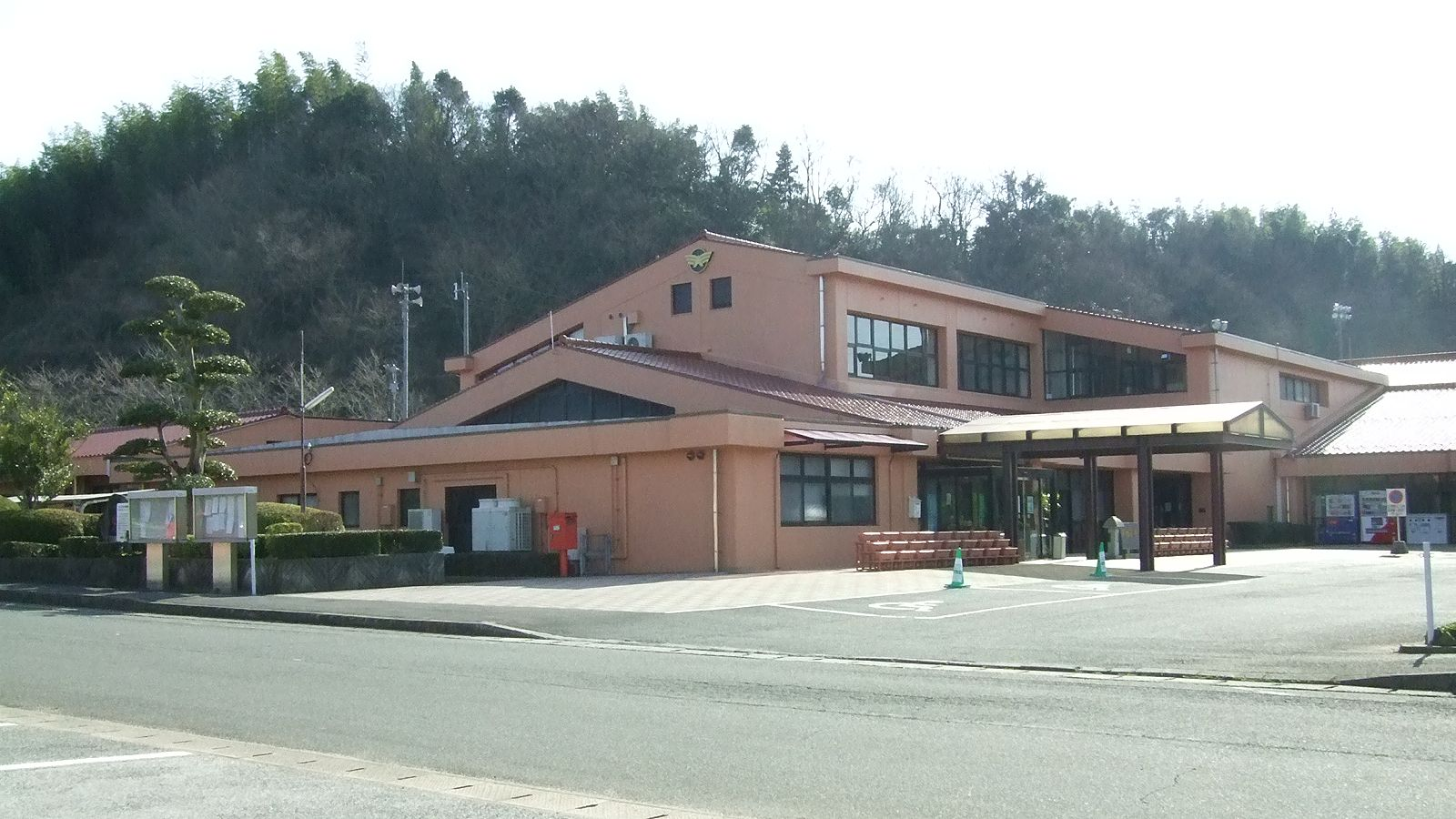
- Aka Village office

- Flag Emblem
- Interactive map of Aka
- Location in Japan
- Coordinates: 33°37′00″N 130°52′15″E
- Country: Japan
- Region: Kyushu
- Prefecture: Fukuoka
- District: Tagawa

Area
  - Total: 31.98 km^{2} (12.35 sq mi)

Population (June 1, 2021)
  - Total: 3,065
  - Density: 95.84/km^{2} (248.2/sq mi)
- Time zone: UTC+09:00 (JST)
- City hall address: 1188 Uchida, Aka-mura, Tagawa-gun, Fukuoka-ken 824-0432
- Website: Official website
- Symbols
- Bird: Zosterops japonicus
- Flower: Cymbidium goeringii
- Tree: Citrus junos

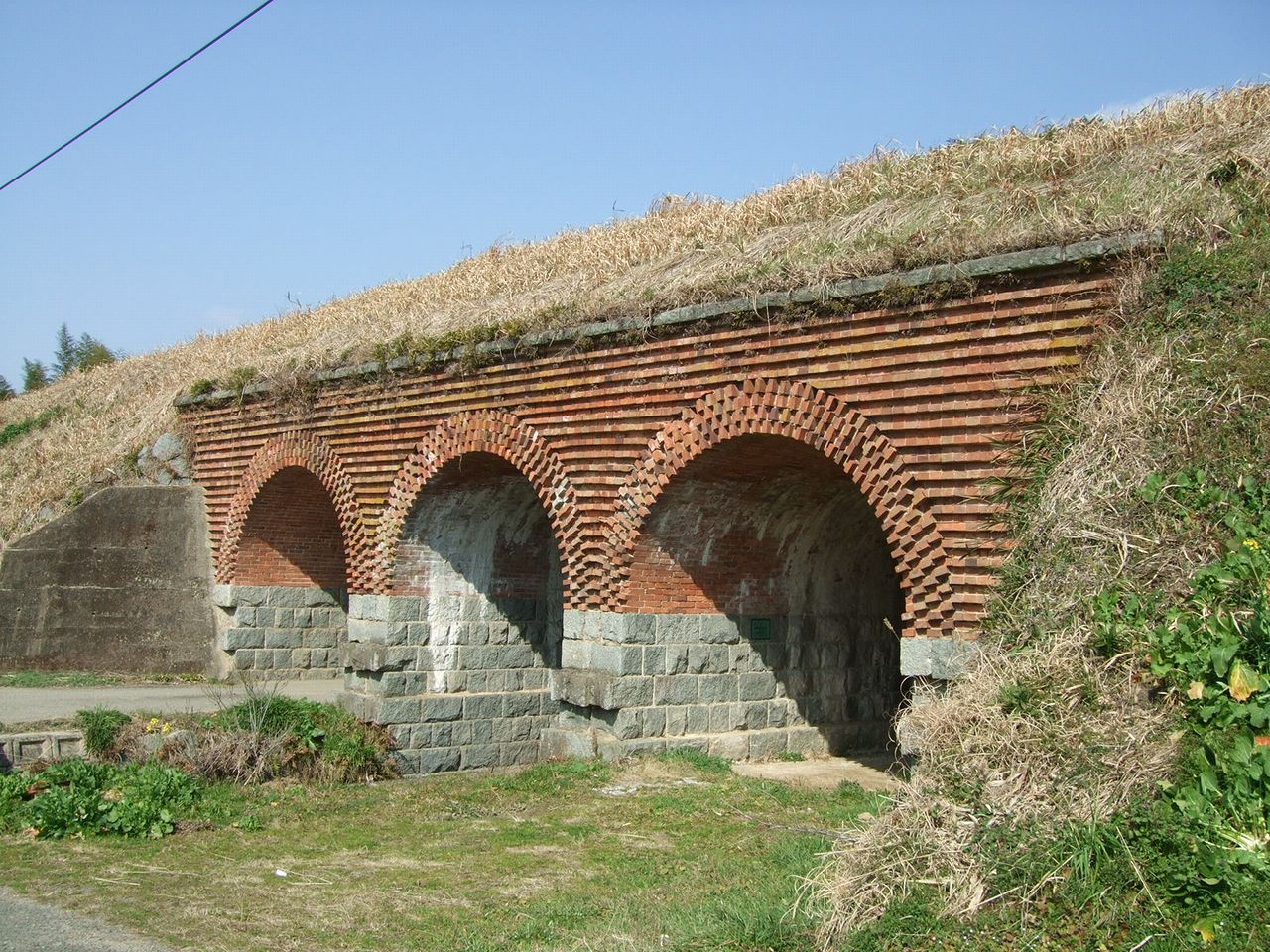
Heiseichikuhō Railway Uchidagawa Sanrenkyō Bridge

Aka (赤村, Aka-mura) is a village located in Tagawa District, Fukuoka Prefecture, Japan. As of 31 December 2023, the village had an estimated population of 3,065 in 1509 households, and a population density of 120 persons per km². The total area of the village is 31.98 km^{2} (12.35 sq mi).

== Geography ==
Aka is located at the foot of Mount Hiko in the eastern part of Fukuoka Prefecture. It is approximately 40 kilometers due east of Fukuoka City, approximately 30 kilometers due south of Kitakyushu City, and 20 kilometers southwest of Yukuhashi City.

=== Neighboring municipalities ===
Fukuoka Prefecture

- Kawara
- Miyako
- Ōtō
- Soeda

=== Climate ===
Aka has a humid subtropical climate (Köppen Cfa) characterized by warm summers and cool winters with light to no snowfall.

=== Demographics ===
Per Japanese census data, the population of Aka is as shown below

Historical population
Year	Pop.	±%
1940	3,696	—
1950	4,970	+34.5%
1960	4,810	−3.2%
1970	3,779	−21.4%
1980	3,853	+2.0%
1990	3,971	+3.1%
2000	3,636	−8.4%
2010	3,253	−10.5%
2020	2,774	−14.7%

== History ==
The area of Aka was part of ancient Buzen Province. During the Edo Period, the area was part of the holdings of Kokura Domain. The village was established on May 1, 1889 with the creation of the modern municipalities system. On August 7, 1945 Aka was bombed by a formation of six American military aircraft, killing five people, injuring three people, and burning down four houses, despite being a purely civilian settlement with no military significance.

== Government ==
Aka has a mayor-council form of government with a directly elected mayor and a unicameral village council of ten members. Aka, collectively with the other municipalities of Tagawa District contributes two members to the Fukuoka Prefectural Assembly. In terms of national politics, the village is part of the Fukuoka 11th district of the lower house of the Diet of Japan.

== Economy ==
Aka has a mainly rural economy based on agriculture. There is very little in terms of industry or commerce. Unlike other municipalities in the Chukuhō region, there was no coal mine development in Aka, and thus it has not been affected much by the rise and fall of the coal industry.

== Education ==
Miyako has one public elementary school and one public junior high school operated by the village government. The village does not have a high school.

== Transportation ==
=== Railways ===
Heisei Chikuhō Railway - Tagawa Line

- Genjiinomori - Yusubaru - Aka - Uchida

=== Highways ===
Aka is not on any national highway or expressway. The nearest interchange is the Yukuhashi Interchange on the Higashikyushu Expressway.

== Noted people from Aka ==
- Mineko Nishikawa, singer
