= Itoda Line =

Railway line in Fukuoka Prefecture, Japan

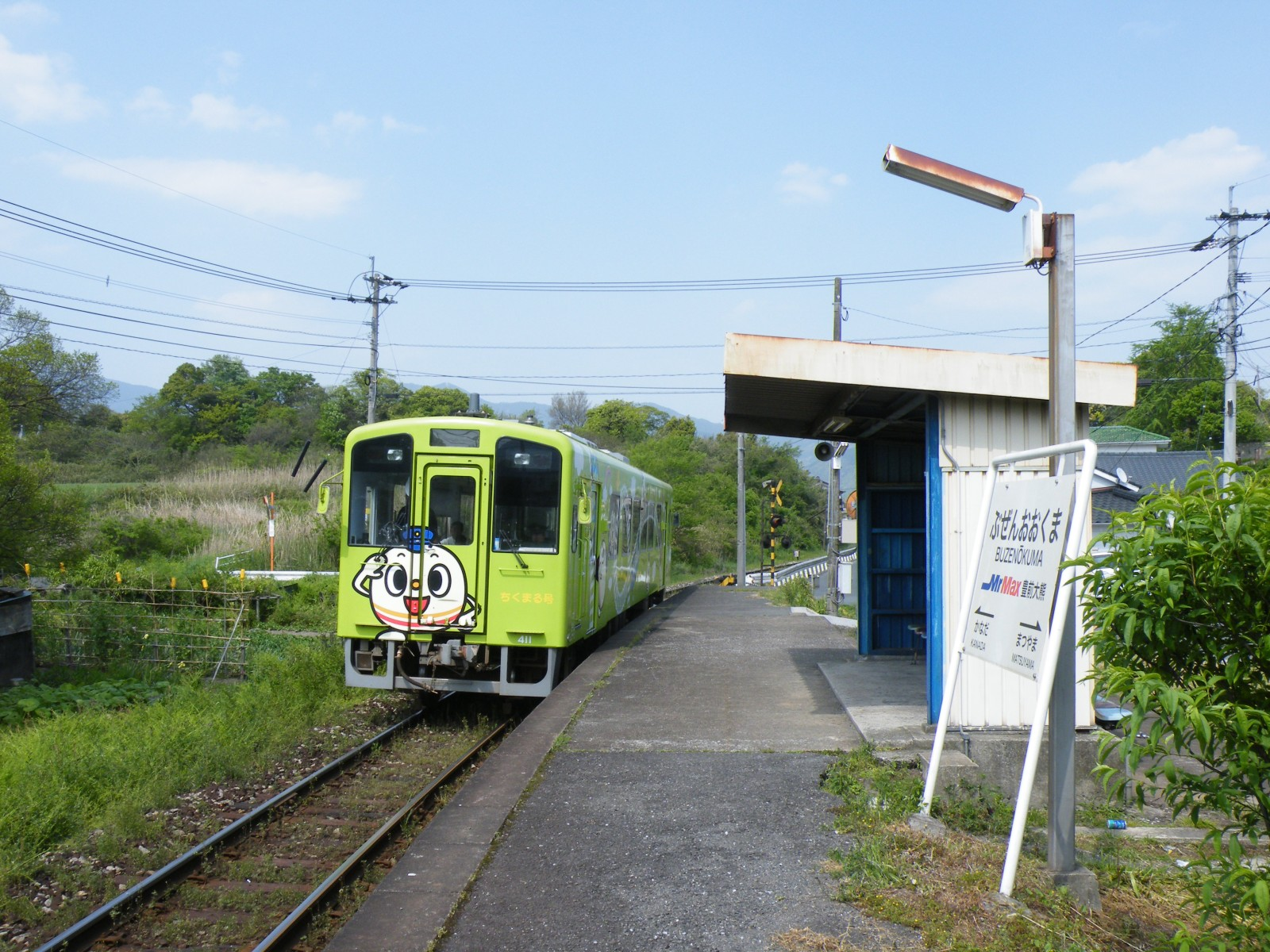
- A Heisei Chikuhō 400-series train on the Itoda Line at Buzen-Ōkuma Station

Overview
- Native name: 糸田線
- Owner: Heisei Chikuhō Railway
- Locale: Fukuoka Prefecture
- Termini: Kanada; Tagawa-Gotōji
- Stations: 6
- Website: www.heichiku.net

Service
- Type: Heavy rail

History
- Opened: 20 October 1897; 129 years ago

Technical
- Line length: 6.8 km (4.2 mi)
- Track gauge: 1,067 mm (3 ft 6 in)
- Electrification: None
Route map

The Itoda Line (糸田線, Itoda-sen) is a 6.8 km railway line owned by the Heisei Chikuhō Railway. The line runs north from Tagawa to Kanada Station, all within Fukuoka Prefecture.

== History ==
The Itoda Line was built in two parts. The first part was built in 1897 as a branch line by the Hōshū Railway (豊州鉄道), a third-sector railway to transport coal from the Chikuhō Coal Mine. It ran north from Gotōji Station (now Tagawa-Gotōji Station) to Miyatoko Station (now Itoda Station). Hōshū Railway was acquired by Kyushu Railway in 1901, which was then nationalized in 1907 into Japanese Government Railways (JGR) under the Railway Nationalization Act. After being nationalized, the line was known as the Miyatoko Line (宮床線, Miyatoko-sen).

In 1927, another third-sector railway company, Kingū Railway (金宮鉄道), built the section between Miyatoko and Kanada Station. Within the same year, the line was transferred to the Kyushu Sankyū Railway (九州産業鉄道), who then changed their name to Sankyū Cement Railway (産業セメント鉄道) in 1933. The line was sold in 1943 during the Second World War to JGR, who operated the entire line as the Itoda Line.

With the privatization of the Japanese National Railways (successor of the JGR) in 1987, the Itoda Line fell under the control of Kyushu Railway Company (JR Kyushu). Then, in 1989, the Itoda Line was transferred to the Heisei Chikuhō Railway, along with the Ita Line and Tagawa Line.

== Operations ==
The line is not electrified and is single-tracked for the entire line.

There is generally an hourly service in each direction. All trains run as local services and stop at all stations. A few services continue past Kanada Station on the Ita Line to Nōgata Station.

== Stations ==
All stations are within Fukuoka Prefecture.

No.	Name		Distance (km)	Connections	Location
HC10	Kanada	金田	0.0	■ Ita Line	Fukuchi
HC51	Buzen-Ōkuma	豊前大熊	1.5		Itoda
HC52	Matsuyama	松山	2.1		Itoda
HC53	Itoda	糸田	3.4		Itoda
HC54	Ōyabu	大藪駅	4.9		Tagawa
HC55	Tagawa-Gotōji	田川後藤寺	6.8	JR Kyushu: JI Hitahikosan Line JJ Gotōji Line	Tagawa
