= Akaike, Fukuoka =

Dissolved municipality in Fukuoka prefecture, Japan

Akaike (赤池町, Akaike-machi) was a town located in Tagawa District, Fukuoka Prefecture, Japan. It was once a coal mining town.

As of 2005, the town had an estimated population of 9,592 and a density of 592.09 persons per km^{2}. The total area was 16.20 km^{2}. This is down from 9,870 (609.26/km^{2}) in 2003.

On March 6, 2006, Akaike was merged with the towns of Hōjō and Kanada (all from Tagawa District) to create the town of Fukuchi, with an estimated population of 25,000 (September 1, 2011).

In 1992, it was the first municipality in Japan to become effectively bankrupt, with losses of 3.2 billion yen, or 1.3 times its annual budget. The town's rehabilitation process was completed at the end of fiscal 2001—two years earlier than initially planned. This was achieved through measures such as slashing the salaries of town officials, raising utility costs, and cutting back on public works projects.

== See also ==
- Yūbari, Hokkaidō—presently the only bankrupt town in Japan.
