= Kawara, Fukuoka =

Kawara 香春町
- Town
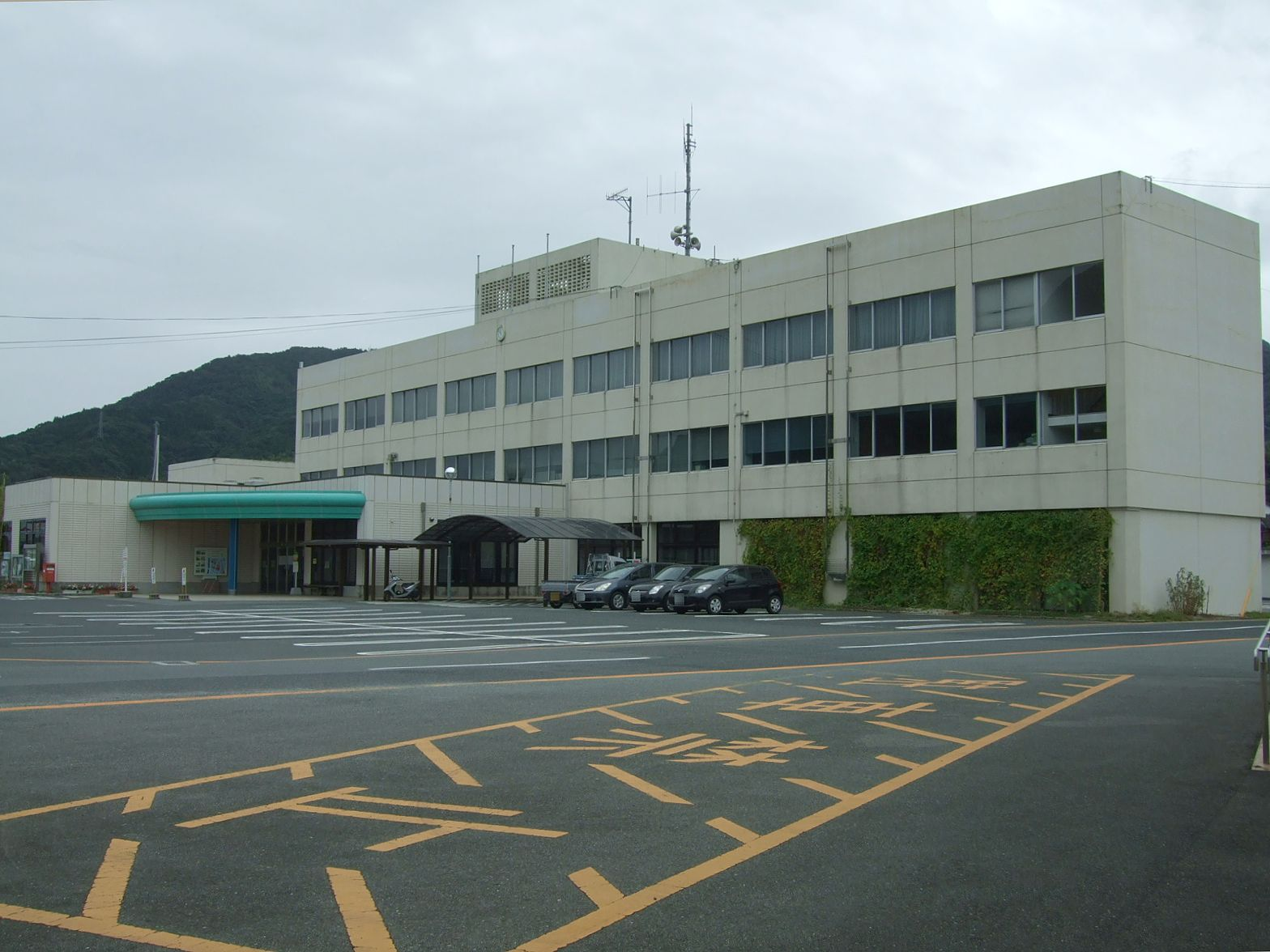
- Kawara Town Office

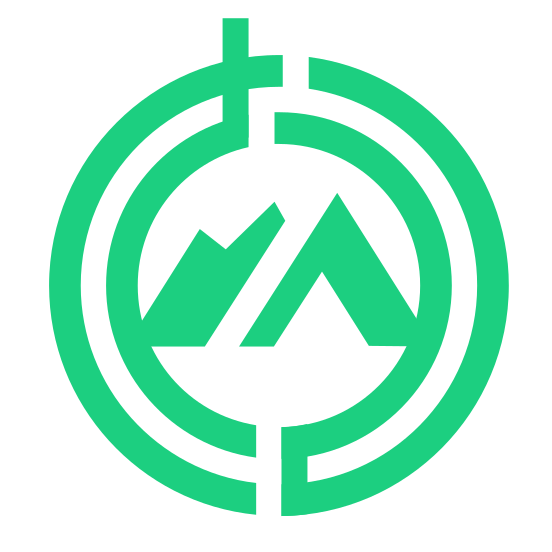
- Flag Emblem
- Interactive map of Kawara
- Location in Japan
- Coordinates: 33°40′05″N 130°50′50″E
- Country: Japan
- Region: Kyushu
- Prefecture: Fukuoka
- District: Tagawa

Area
  - Total: 44.50 km^{2} (17.18 sq mi)

Population (December 31, 2023)
  - Total: 10,164
  - Density: 228.4/km^{2} (591.6/sq mi)
- Time zone: UTC+09:00 (JST)
- City hall address: 994 Takano, Kawara-cho, Tagawa-gun, Fukuoka-ken 822-1492
- Website: Official website
- Symbols
- Bird: Japanese bush warbler
- Flower: Prunus mume
- Tree: Ginkgo biloba

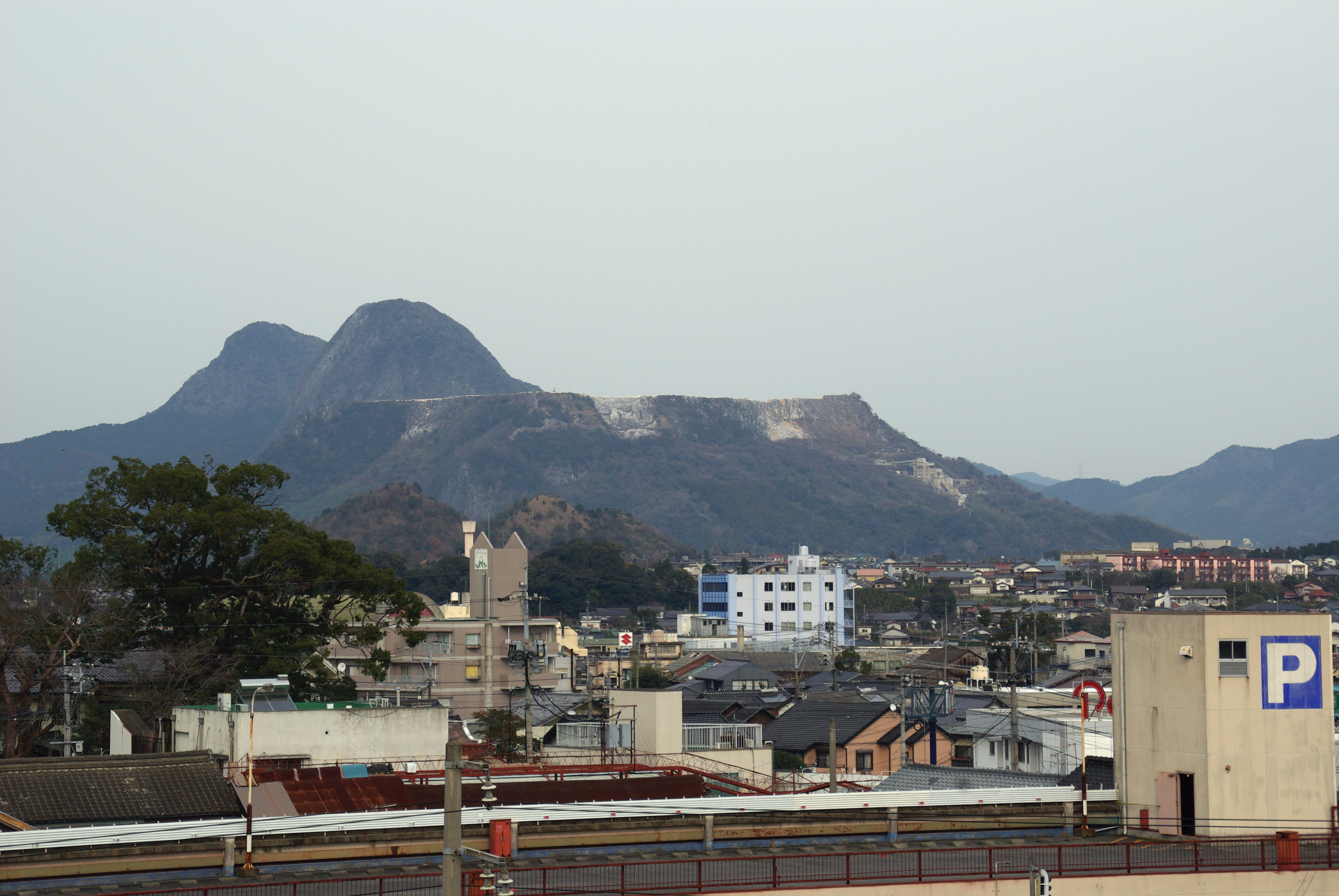
Mount Kawara

Kawara (香春町, Kawara-machi) is a town located in Tagawa District, Fukuoka Prefecture, Japan. As of 31 December 2023, the town had an estimated population of 10,164 in 5388 households, and a population density of 120 persons per km^{2}. The total area of the town is 44.50 km^{2} (17.18 sq mi).

== Geography ==
Kawara is located in the northeastern part of Fukuoka Prefecture, at the northeastern end of the Chikuho region. Most of the town area is mountainous, except for the southwestern edge. Mt. Ushizari in the western part of town and Ryugahana in the northern part of the town attract the largest number of climbers throughout the year, especially during the spring tourist season. Kaharudake, located in the western part of the town, is mainly made of limestone, and became famous after appearing in the novel The Gate of Youth by Hiroyuki Itsuki.

=== Neighboring municipalities ===
Fukuoka Prefecture

- Aka
- Fukuchi
- Kitakyushu
- Miyako
- Ōtō
- Tagawa

=== Climate ===
Kawara has a humid subtropical climate (Köppen Cfa) characterized by warm summers and cool winters with light to no snowfall. The average annual temperature in Kawara is 15.5 °C. The average annual rainfall is 1560 mm with September as the wettest month. The temperatures are highest on average in August, at around 26.5 °C, and lowest in January, at around 4.7 °C.

=== Demographics ===
Per Japanese census data, the population of Kawara is as shown below

Historical population
Year	Pop.	±%
1940	13,176	—
1950	17,382	+31.9%
1960	18,115	+4.2%
1970	14,917	−17.7%
1980	14,716	−1.3%
1990	14,476	−1.6%
2000	13,104	−9.5%
2010	11,681	−10.9%
2020	10,191	−12.8%

== History ==
The area of Kawara was part of ancient Buzen Province, and its name appears as early as the Nara period in official documents as a location settled by toraijin immigrants from the Korean Peninsula. Many of the place names in the town are said to be derived from ancient Korean, and copper from mines in Kawara was used in the construction of the Nara Daibutsu. During the Edo Period, the area was part of the holdings of Kokura Domain. In 1866, during the Bakumatsu period, the forces of Chōshū Domain attacked and burned down Kokura Castle, forcing the domain to relocated its seat to a jin'ya constructed in Kawara. The village of Kawara was established on May 1, 1889 with the creation of the modern municipalities system. It was raised to town status on July 22, 1898. On September 30, 1956 Kawara annexed the neighboring villages of Kagane and Nidosho.

== Government ==
Kawara has a mayor-council form of government with a directly elected mayor and a unicameral town council of 13 members. Kawara, collectively with the other municipalities of Tagawa District contributes two members to the Fukuoka Prefectural Assembly. In terms of national politics, the town is part of the Fukuoka 11th district of the lower house of the Diet of Japan.

== Economy ==
During the Meiji period, Kawara, along with the other municipalities of the Chikuho area, developed with the Kitakyushu industrial zone through coal mining, and is still considered part of to the Greater Kitakyushu Metropolitan Area. However, as the demand for coal decreased due to the energy revolution, the coal mines that had sponsored prosperity have closed, as have the cement plants and other industries, leading to depopulation. Kawara still has active limestone quarries.

== Education ==
Kawara has one public combined elementary & junior high school, operated by the town government, and one public high school, operated by the Fukuoka Prefectural Board of Education.

== Transportation ==
=== Railways ===
JR Kyushu – Hitahikosan Line

- Saidōsho – Kawara – Ippommatsu

Heisei Chikuhō Railway – Tagawa Line

- Kakishita-Onsen-Guchi – Magarikane

=== Highways ===
- Kyushu Expressway
- Higashikyushu Expressway
- National Route 201
- National Route 322
