= Magarikane Station =

Railway station in Kawara, Fukuoka Prefecture, Japan

Magarikane Station 勾金駅
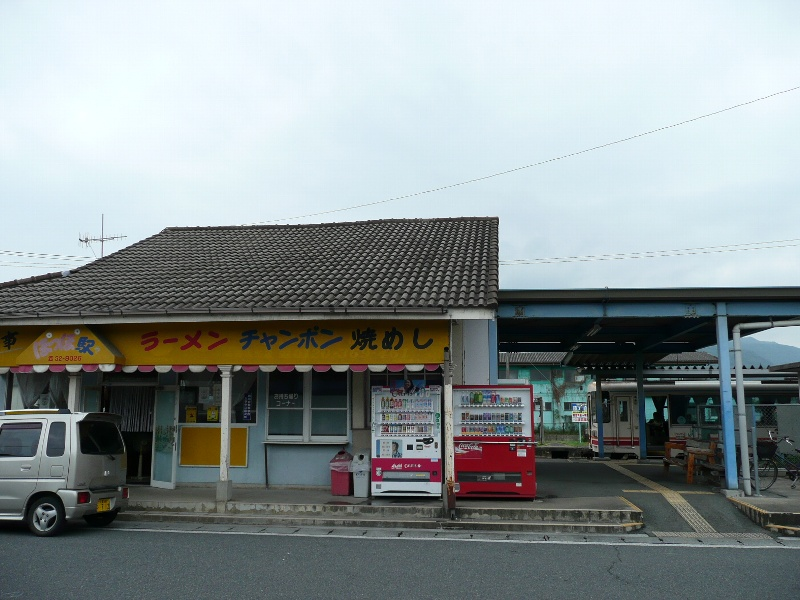
- Station entrance

General information
- Location: 1679-2 Nakatsubaru, Kawara-machi, Tagawa-gun, Fukuoka-ken 822-1405; Japan
- Coordinates: 33.6516°N 130.8423°E
- Operator: Heisei Chikuhō Railway
- Line: ■ Tagawa Line
- Distance: 23.6 km (from Yukuhashi Station)
- Platforms: 2 side platforms

Construction
- Structure type: At-grade

Other information
- Status: Unstaffed
- Station code: HC17
- Website: Official website

History
- Opened: 15 August 1895

Services
Preceding station	Heisei Chikuhō Railway	Following station
Kakishita-Onsen-Guchi towards Yukuhashi	Tagawa Line	Kamiita towards Tagawa-Ita
Location

Magarikane Station (勾金駅, Magarikane-eki) is a passenger railway station located in the town of Kawara, Fukuoka Prefecture, Japan. It is operated by the third-sector railway operator Heisei Chikuhō Railway. On 1 April 2009, nearby Tagara High School acquired naming rights to the station. Therefore, the station is alternatively known as Tagawa High School Magarikane Station (田川高校前 勾金駅, Tagawakōkō-Magarikane-eki).

== Lines ==
Magarikane Station is served by the Tagawa and is located 23.6 km from the starting point of the line at Yukuhashi. Trains arrive roughly every 30 minutes.

== Layout ==
The station consists of two opposed unnumbered side platform connected to the station building by a level crossing. The station is unattended.

== Platforms ==
Station side	■ ■ Tagawa Line	for Tagawa-Ita, Kanada, Nōgata
Opposite side	■ ■ Tagawa Line	for Saigawa and Yukuhashi

== History ==
The station was opened on 15 August 1885 as Kawara Station (香春駅) on the private Hōshū Railroad. The Kyushu Railway merged with Hōshū Railroad in 1901 and was nationalized in 1907. The station was renamed to its present name on 1 May 1943. Between 1899 and 1973, a short freight-only branch line ran from this station north to Natsuyoshi. With the privatization of the JNR on 1 April 1987, it became a station on JR Kyushu and was transferred to the Heisei Chikuho Railway on 1 October 1989.

== Surrounding area ==
- Fukuoka Prefectural Tagawa High School
- Fukuoka Prefectural Agricultural and Forestry High School
- Magarikane Post Office
- Muryōkō-ji Temple

== See also ==
- List of railway stations in Japan
