= Hōjō, Fukuoka =

Dissolved municipality in Fukuoka prefecture, Japan

Hōjō (方城町, Hōjō-machi) was a town located in Tagawa District, Fukuoka Prefecture, Japan.

As of 2003, the town had an estimated population of 7,831 and a density of 426.06 persons per km^{2}. The total area was 18.38 km^{2}.

On March 6, 2006, Hōjō was merged with the towns of Akaike and Kanada (all from Tagawa District) to create the town of Fukuchi.
