= Kawara Station =

Railway station in Kawara, Fukuoka Prefecture, Japan

JI 11 Kawara Station 香春駅
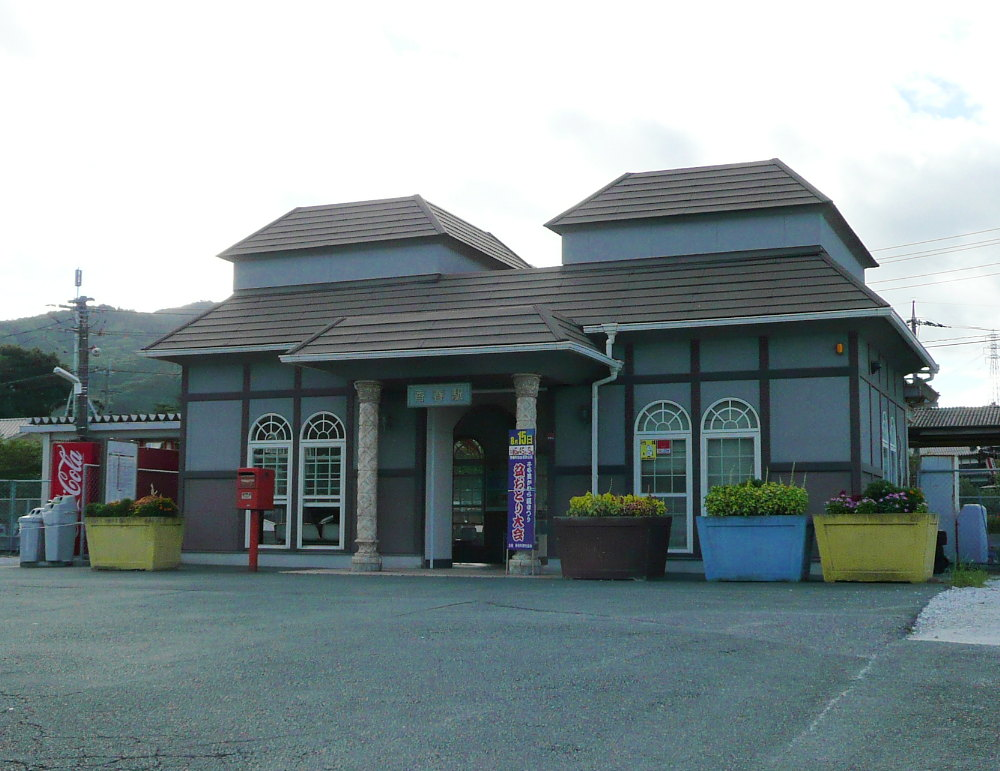
- Kawara Station in August 2007

General information
- Location: 11121-2 Kawara, Kawara-machi, Tagawa-gun, Fukuoka-ken; Japan
- Coordinates: 33°39′58″N 130°50′49″E
- Operator: JR Kyushu
- Line: JI Hitahikosan Line
- Distance: 23.4 km from Jōno
- Platforms: 2 side platforms
- Tracks: 2

Other information
- Status: Unstaffed
- Station code: JI11
- Website: Official website

History
- Opened: 1 April 1915
- Former names: Kamikawara (to 1943)

Services
Preceding station	JR Kyushu	Following station
Ippommatsu towards Yoake	Hitahikosan Line	Saidōsho towards Kokura
Location
- Location within Fukuoka Prefecture Location within Japan

Kawara Station (香春駅, Kawara-eki) is a passenger railway station located in the town of Kawara, Fukuoka Prefecture, Japan. It is operated by JR Kyushu.

== Lines ==
The station is served by the Hitahikosan Line and is located 23.4 km from the starting point of the line at Jōno. One train per hour stops at the station during the daytime, increased to two per hour during the morning and evening peaks.

== Layout ==
The station consists of two opposed side platforms. The station is unattended. Currently, the former station office houses the office of the Kaharu Town Tourism Association

=== Platforms ===
1	■ JI Hitahikosan Line	for Jōno and Kokura
2	■ JI Hitahikosan Line	for Tagawa-Gotōji and Soeda

== History ==
The station opened on 1 April 1915 as Kamikawara Station (上香春駅) on the Kokura Railway. The railway was nationalized on 1 May 1943, becoming the Soeda Line, and the name of the station was changed to its present name. The Soeda Line was renamed the Hita Line on 15 March 1956, and the section of this line containing this station became the Hitahikoya Line on 1 April 1960. With the privatization of the JNR on 1 April 1987, this station came under the control of JR Kyushu. The station building burned down on 10 September 1995 and a new station building was completed on 16 March 1996.

== Surrounding area ==
- Kawara Town Hall
- Kawara Town Kawara Junior High School
- Kawara Municipal Kogane Junior High School

== See also ==
- List of railway stations in Japan
