= Matsuyama Station (Fukuoka) =

Railway station in Itoda, Fukuoka Prefecture, Japan

Matsuyama Station 松山駅
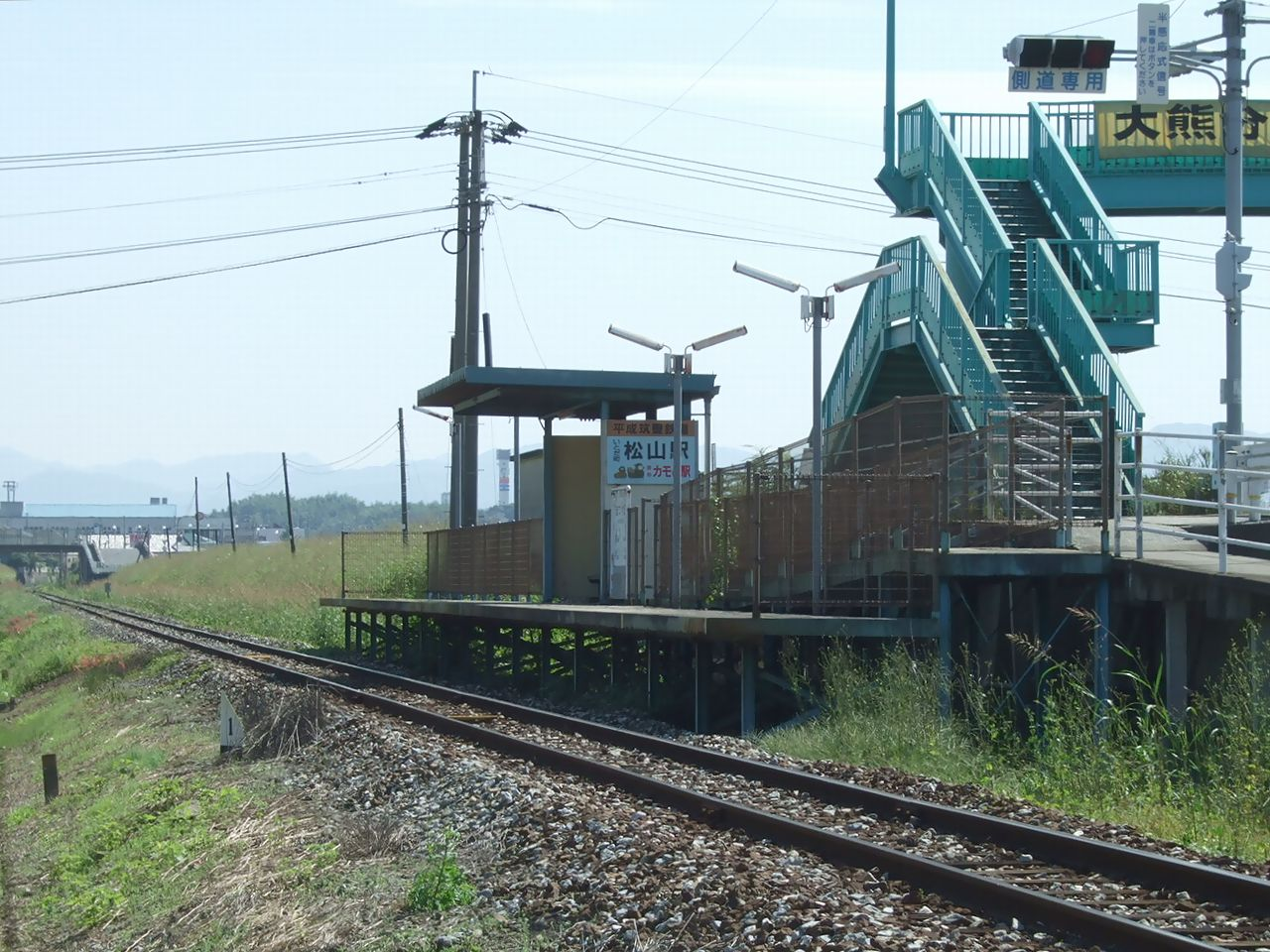
- Station platform

General information
- Location: 3933-4-4 Itoda, Itoda-cho, Tagawa-gun, Fukuoka-ken 822-1300; Japan
- Coordinates: 33.6678°N 130.7808°E
- Operator: Heisei Chikuhō Railway
- Line: ■ Itoda Line
- Distance: 2.1 km (from Kanada Station)
- Platforms: 1 side platform

Construction
- Structure type: At-grade

Other information
- Status: Unstaffed
- Station code: HC52
- Website: Official website

History
- Opened: 22 March 1997

Services
Preceding station	Heisei Chikuhō Railway	Following station
Buzen-Ōkuma towards Kanada	Itoda Line	Itoda towards Tagawa-Gotōji
Location
- Location within Fukuoka Prefecture Location within Japan

Matsuyama Station (松山駅, Matsuyama-eki) is a passenger railway station located in the town of Itoda, Fukuoka Prefecture, Japan. It is operated by the third-sector railway operator Heisei Chikuhō Railway.

== Lines ==
Matsuyama Station is served by the Itoda Line and is located 2.1 km from the starting point of the line at Kanada. Trains arrive roughly every hour.

== Layout ==
The station consists of one side platform serving a single bi-directional track. There is no station building, but only a shelter on the platform. The station is unattended.

== History ==
The station opened on 22 March 1997.

== Surrounding area ==
- Hiyoshi Shrine

== See also ==
- List of railway stations in Japan
