= Mount Kasagi =

Mountain in Kyōto Prefecture, Japan

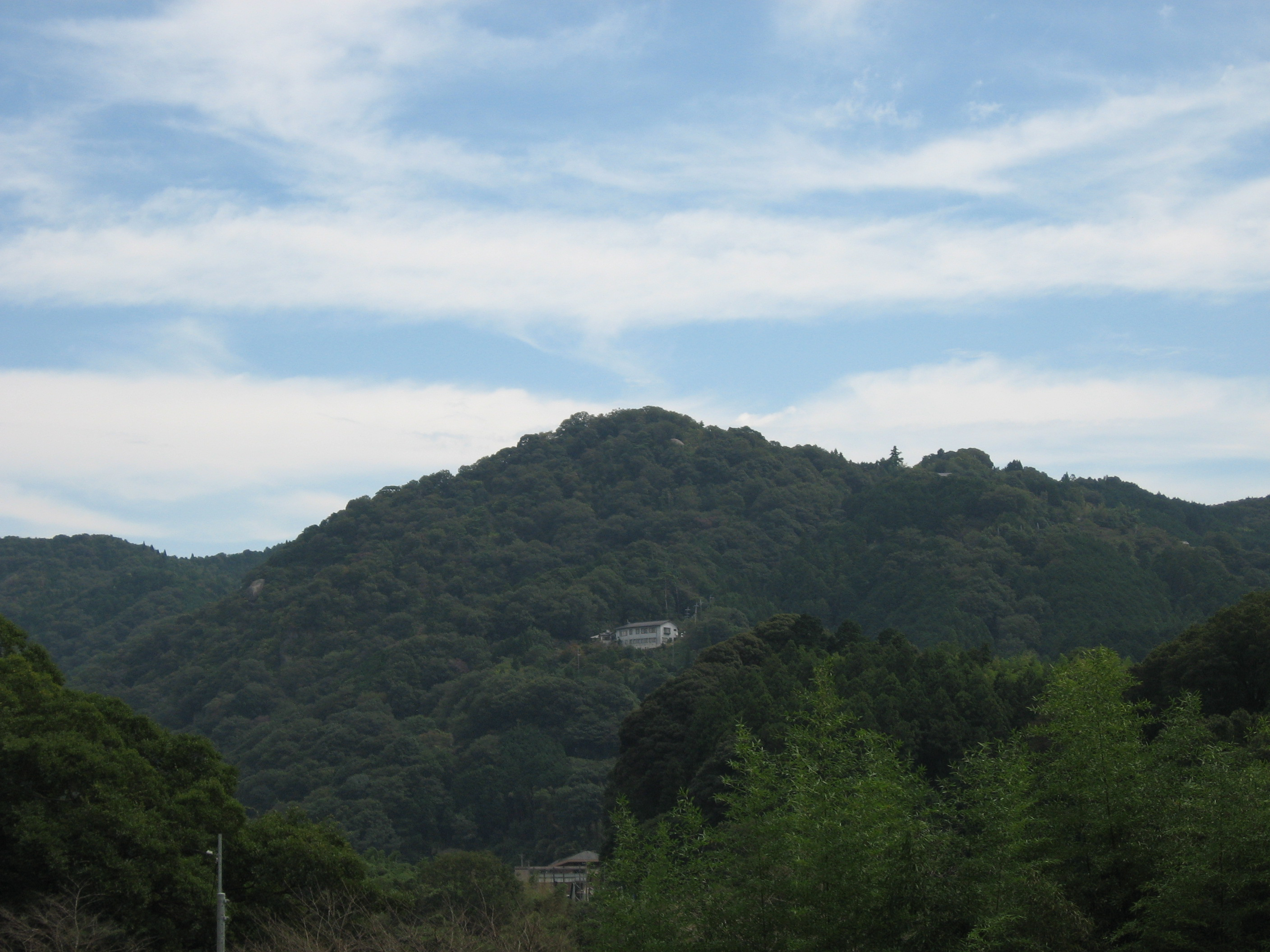
- Mount Kasagi

Highest point
- Elevation: 289 m (948 ft)
- Coordinates: 34°45′24″N 135°56′38″E

Geography
- Location within Kyoto Prefecture Location within Japan
- Country: Japan
- State: Kyoto Prefecture
- Region: Kansai region
- National Place of Scenic Beauty National Historic Site of Japan

Mount Kasagi (笠置山, Kasagi-yama) is a 289-meter mountain located in the town of Kasagi, Soraku District, Kyoto Prefecture in the Kansai area of Japan. The mountain is known for its many oddly shaped rocks and as a battlefield during the wars of the Kenmu Restoration at the end of the Kamakura period. The mountain has been protected from 1932 as a nationally designated Place of Scenic Beauty and National Historic Site. The mountain is also located within the borders of the Kasagiyama Prefectural Natural Park.

== Overview ==
Mount Kasagi is located in southern Kyoto Prefecture, on the south bank of the Kizu River. As with Kontai-ji located to the north, there are many strangely shaped rocks and stones within the mountain, and it has been a center for the Shugendō mountain training since ancient times, but as with all mountain temples, the history of its founding is not clearly known. According to the medieval record Kasagi-dera engi, a Buddhist temple was founded on Mount Kasagi during the Hakuhō period by Emperor Kōbun or Emperor Tenmu; however, worship centered on giant rocks predates the establishment of this temple. Historically it has had close relations with Tōdai-ji and Kōfuku-ji in Nara. It is an important temple in the history of Buddhism in Japan, and many eminent monks have served as abbot. According to legend, the annual Omizutori ceremony at Tōdai-ji was begun by the monk Jitchū after he discovered a passage here that led to the heavenly home of Maitreya (Miroku Bosatsu). The honzon of the temple at Mount Kasagi was a 16-meter tall bas-relief image of Maitreya carved into a cliff face, and a similar 12-meter tall image of Ākāśagarbha (Kokuzō Bosatsu). The images are estimated to have been made in the late Nara period. With a rise in popularity of worship in Maitreya in the Heian period, Mount Kasagi became a center of pilgrimage, attracting both the aristocracy of Kyoto and the common people.

However, at the end of the Kamakura period, Emperor Go-Daigo rose against the Kamakura shogunate and made Mount Kasagi his battlefield headquarters, raising an army and fortifying the mountain. The temple was destroyed during the Siege of Kasagi in the 1331 Genkō War by shogunate forces and the image of Maitreya was irreparably damaged, leaving only its halo.

At present, the image of Ākāśagarbha remains, and is protected as Japan's largest and oldest linear magaibutsu image. The mountain is also famous for its scenery, as the entire mountain is covered with broad-leaved trees, creating a bright natural forest.The riverbed at the foot of the mountain is planted with cherry blossoms, making it especially beautiful during the flower season and autumn foliage season. It is crowded with many vacationers.

The trailhead to climb the mountain is a five-minute walk from the JR West Kansai Main Line Kasagi Station.

== See also ==
- List of Historic Sites of Japan (Kyoto)
- List of Places of Scenic Beauty of Japan (Kyoto)
