= Kasagi, Kyoto =

Kasagi 笠置町
- Town
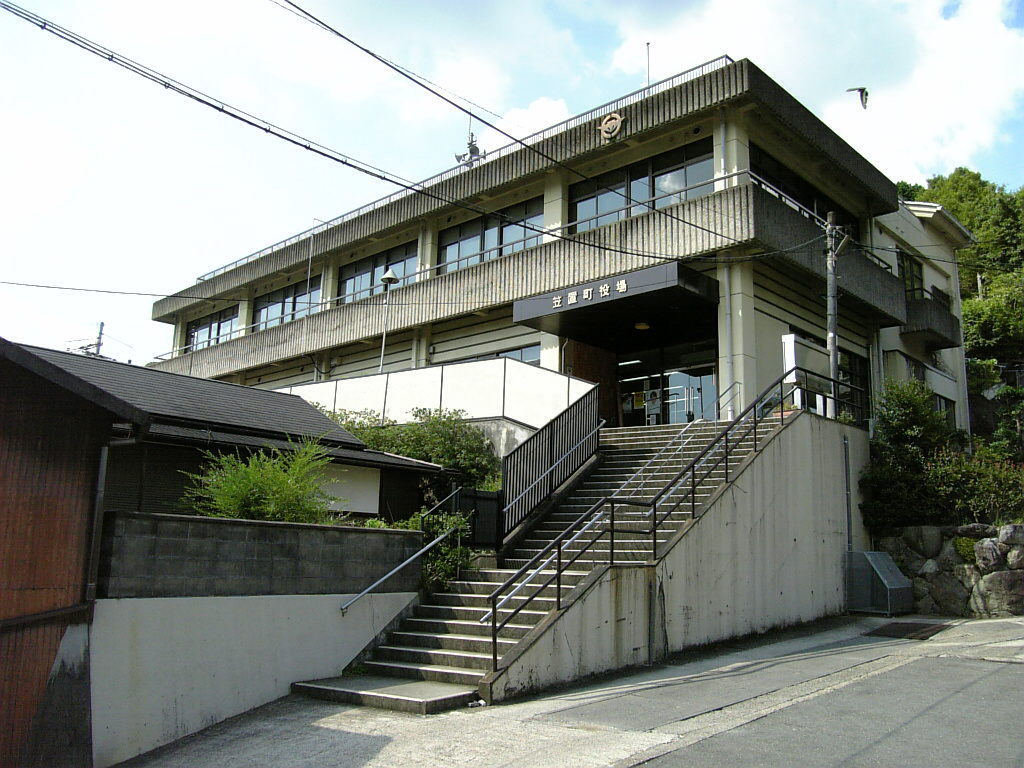
- Kasagi Town Hall

- Flag Chapter
- Interactive map of Kasagi
- Location in Japan
- Coordinates: 34°45′38″N 135°56′22″E
- Country: Japan
- Region: Kansai
- Prefecture: Kyoto
- District: Sōraku

Area
  - Total: 23.52 km^{2} (9.08 sq mi)

Population (April 1, 2024)
  - Total: 1,108
  - Density: 47.11/km^{2} (122.0/sq mi)
- Time zone: UTC+09:00 (JST)
- City hall address: 90-1 Kasagi Nishi-dori, Kasagi-machi, Soraku-gun, Kyoto-fu 619-1303
- Website: Official website
- Symbols
- Bird: Japanese bush warbler
- Flower: Prunus × yedoensis
- Tree: Rhododendron

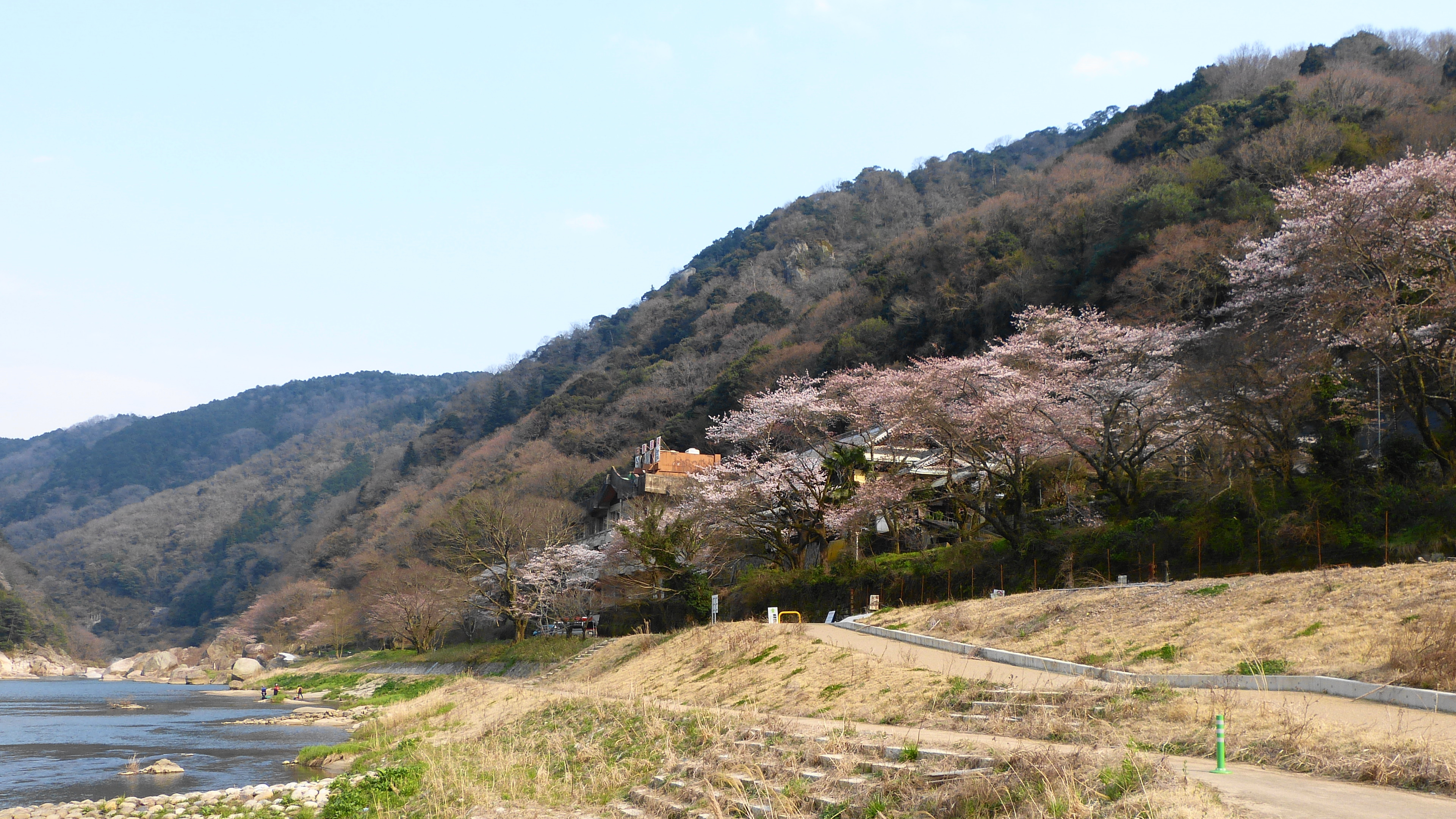
Kizugawa River and Mount Kasagi

Kasagi (笠置町, Kasagi-chō) is a town in Sōraku District, Kyoto Prefecture, Japan. As of 1 April 2024, it has a population of 1,108 in 579 households and a population density of 47 persons per km^{2}. The total area of the town is 23.52 square kilometres (9.08 sq mi). It has the smallest population of any municipality in Kyoto.

== Geography ==
Kasagi is located in far southern Kyoto Prefecture. Forests occupy 80% of the total area, with the Kizugawa River flowing through the center of the town, the Nunome River and the Uchitaki River flowing from the south, and the Yokogawa River from the north. The town also enclaves scattered in the eastern part of the Kamo district of Kizugawa city. Parts of the town are within the borders of the Kasagiyama Prefectural Natural Park.

== Neighboring municipalities ==
Kyoto Prefecture

- Kizugawa
- Minamiyamashiro
- Wazuka

Nara Prefecture

- Nara

=== Climate ===
Kasagi has a humid subtropical climate (Köppen Cfa) characterized by warm summers and cool winters with light to no snowfall. The average annual temperature in Kasagi is 13.7 °C. The average annual rainfall is 1439 mm with September as the wettest month. The temperatures are highest on average in August, at around 25.7 °C, and lowest in January, at around 2.1 °C.

== Demographics ==
Per Japanese census data, the population of Kasagi has declined in recent decades.

Historical population
Year	Pop.	±%
1940	2,595	—
1950	3,323	+28.1%
1960	3,048	−8.3%
1970	2,721	−10.7%
1980	2,506	−7.9%
1990	2,311	−7.8%
2000	2,056	−11.0%
2010	1,626	−20.9%
2020	1,144	−29.6%

== History ==
The area of Kasagi was part of ancient Yamashiro Province. The Kasagi-cho area developed as a key hub for water transportation from ancient times, as wood was cut and transported using the Kizugawa waterway for the construction of Tōdai-ji in Nara. During the Genkō War of 1331, Kasagi-dera became the temporary palace of Emperor Go-Daigo during the Siege of Kasagi. During the Edo Period, the area north of the Kizugawa River was part of Tsu Domain, whereas the area south of the river was Yagyū Domain. The village of Kasagi was established on April 1, 1889 with the creation of the modern municipalities system. Kasagi was raised to town status on January 1, 1934.

== Government ==
Kasagi has a mayor-council form of government with a directly elected mayor and a unicameral town council of eight members. Kasagi, collectively with the other municipalities of Sōraku District and the city of Kizugawa, contributes two members to the Kyoto Prefectural Assembly. In terms of national politics, the town is part of the Kyoto 6th district of the lower house of the Diet of Japan.

== Economy ==
Kasagi is a rural area, with an economy based on agriculture and forestry.

== Local attractions ==
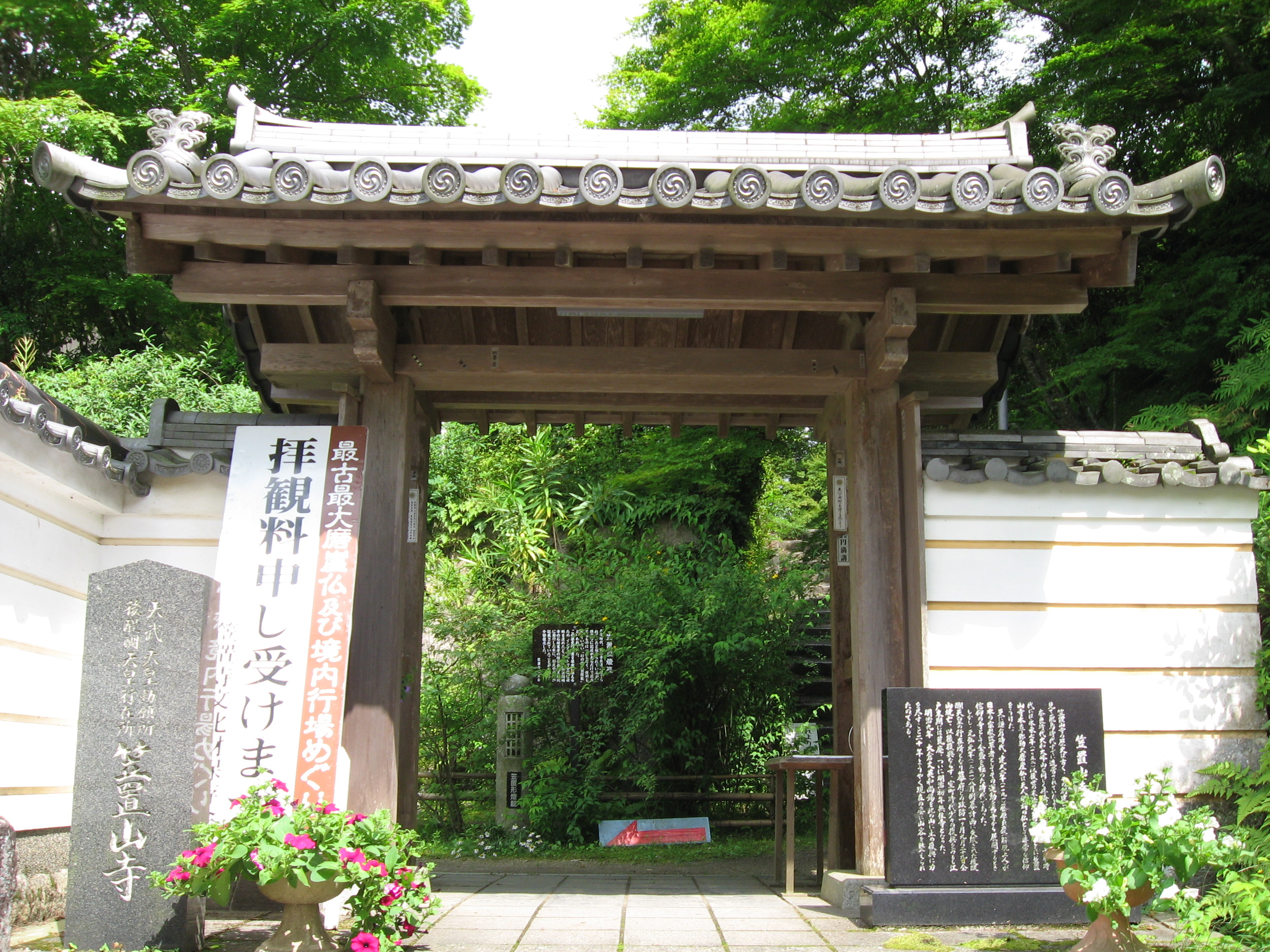
Gate of Kasagidera

- Kasagi-dera (笠置寺) was a Shingon sect Buddhist temple said to have been founded by Emperor Kōbun or Emperor Tenmu. Historically it has had close relations with Tōdai-ji and Kōfuku-ji in Nara. It is an important temple in the history of Buddhism in Japan, and many eminent monks have served as abbot. According to legend, the annual Omizutori ceremony at Tōdai-ji was begun by the monk Jitchū after he discovered a passage here that led to the heavenly home of Maitreya.

== Education ==
Kasagi has one public elementary school and one public junior high school operated by the Sōraku Tōbu kōiki rengō. The town does not have a high school

== Transportation ==
=== Railway ===
JR West - Kansai Main Line

- Kasagi

=== Highways ===
- National Route 163
