= Eleven-Faced Avalokitesvara Heart Dharani Sutra =

Buddhist sutra

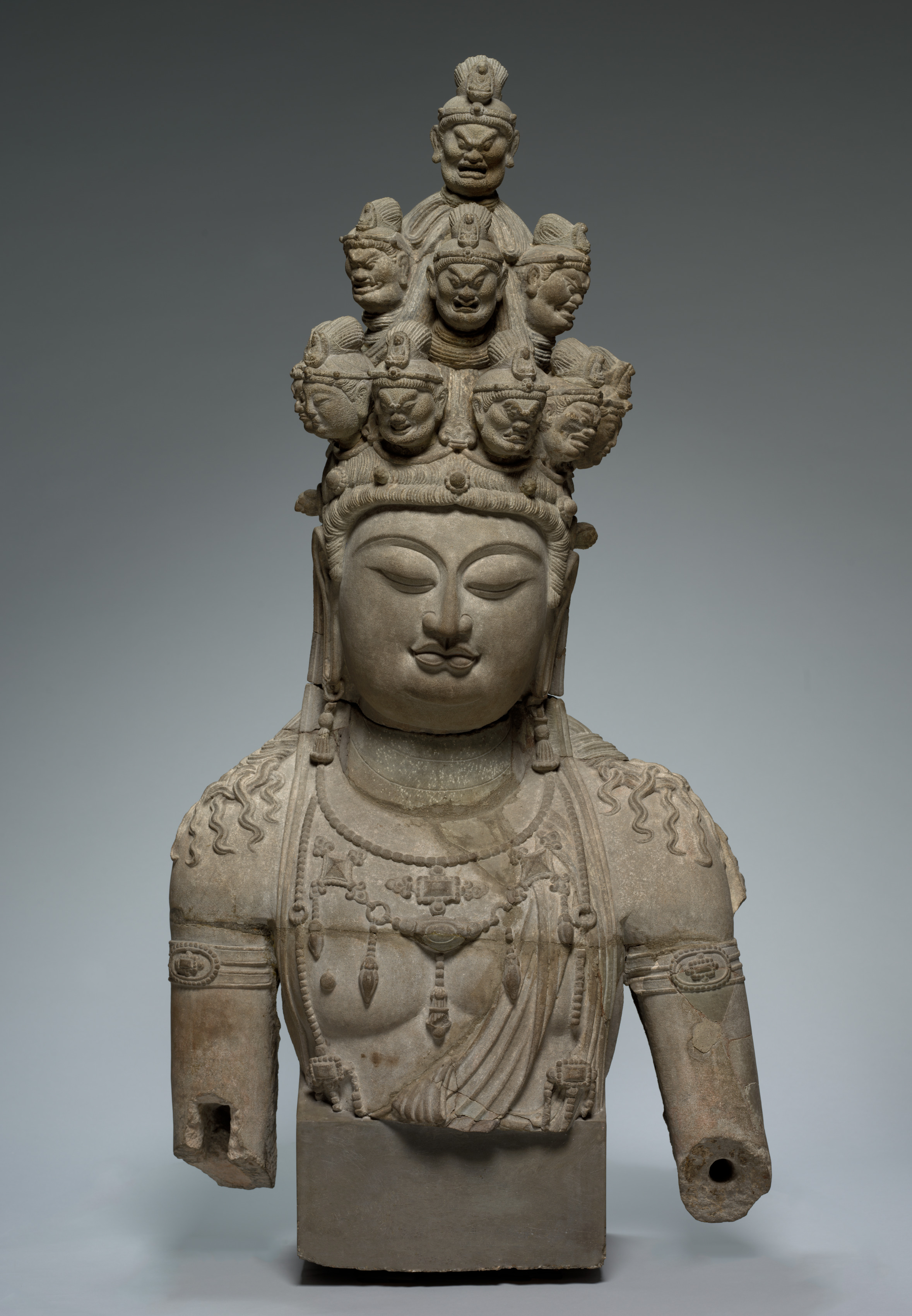
Eleven Faced Avalokitesvara sculpture, Tang China (around 700 CE), Cleveland Museum of Art.

The Dhāraṇī of Avalokiteśvara Ekadaśamukha Sūtra (Eleven-Faced Avalokiteśvara Heart Dharani Sutra, Chinese: 佛說十一面觀世音神咒經 / 圣十一面观自在菩萨根本咒) is a Dhāraṇī sutra (a sutra focused on specific magical chants, incantations, recitations called dhāraṇī) first translated from Sanskrit into Chinese on the 28th day of the third lunar month of 656 CE, by Xuanzang.

This sutra contains the dhāraṇī Heart-dhāraṇī of Avalokiteśvara-ekadaśamukha (Chinese:聖十一面觀自在菩薩根本咒). "Eleven faced Avalokiteśvara" is a form of Avalokiteśvara bodhisattva with eleven heads. In the text, the Buddha introduces, discussed how to practice the dhāraṇī and talks about the benefits and the incredible power of this dhāraṇī.

This is a popular chant throughout East Asia. There is a sung version of the dhāraṇī that is very popular among Asian Buddhists and is performed by famous religious or lay artists, which again is also mislabeled as the Great Compassion Mantra in Sanskrit.

== The Dhāraṇī sutra ==
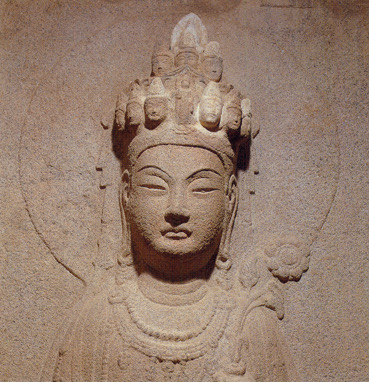
The Eleven Faced Gwanseum (Korean name of Avalokiteśvara) , stone carving.Seokguram Grotto, Gyeongju, South Korea.

=== Title ===
The title of the sutras in different languages are:

- Chinese: 佛說十一面觀世音神咒經 (pinyin: Fó shuō shí yī miàn Guānshìyīn shén zhòu jīng) or 圣十一面观自在菩萨根本咒 (pinyin: Shèng shí yī miàn Guānzìzài Púsà gēnběn zhòu
- Japanese: 十一面神呪心經, Romanji: Jūichimen-jinshushin-gyō
- The title in Tibetan is Spyan-ras-gzigs-dbang-phyug-shal bcu-gcig-pa,
- The Sanskrit title recovered from the Tibetan translation is: Avalokiteśvara ekadaśamukha dhāraṇī.
- Alternatively, the sutra's title has been translated as the Eleven-Faced Avalokitesvara Heart Dharani Sutra by Professor Ryuichi Abe.

=== Versions ===
There are several versions, which are often confused with each other. It is generally believed that this dhāraṇī has no direct relationship with the Great Compassion Mantra in Mahayana Buddhism. However, it is often falsely named as the Tibetan Great Compassion Mantra (藏傳大悲咒) or the Great Compassion Mantra in Sanskrit (梵音大悲咒) in Chinese-speaking regions and in Vietnam, many people unduly conflating the two texts.

We can refer to at least three sources to study this sutra, whose respective versions do not coincide exactly. The scholar Nalinaksha Dutt wrote in his book Gilgit manuscripts (1939):

Ekadasamukham. The condition of the manuscript is good. The scribe must have been a poor Sanskritist for the manuscript bristles with numerous mistakes even in spelling.

It should be kept in mind that until the discovery of the Gilgit manuscripts in 1931, the Ekadaśamukha-sūtra was known only from the Chinese and Tibetan versions, which in turn were retranslated into Sanskrit. This means that the original language text could only be studied from 1931. Unfortunately, the manuscripts found dating from the 5th or 6th century are deteriorated or incomplete, and it is often difficult to reconstruct the exact text.

Hence the differences mentioned (at best), or (at worst), the near impossibility of reconstructing the text in its entirety. The Indian scholar Nalinaksha Dutt carried out, between 1939 and 1943, a considerable work of reconstitution of the Sanskrit manuscripts, without however translating them into English.

== The Dhāraṇī ==
=== The Heart-dhāraṇī of Avalokiteśvara-ekadaśamukha Sūtra ===
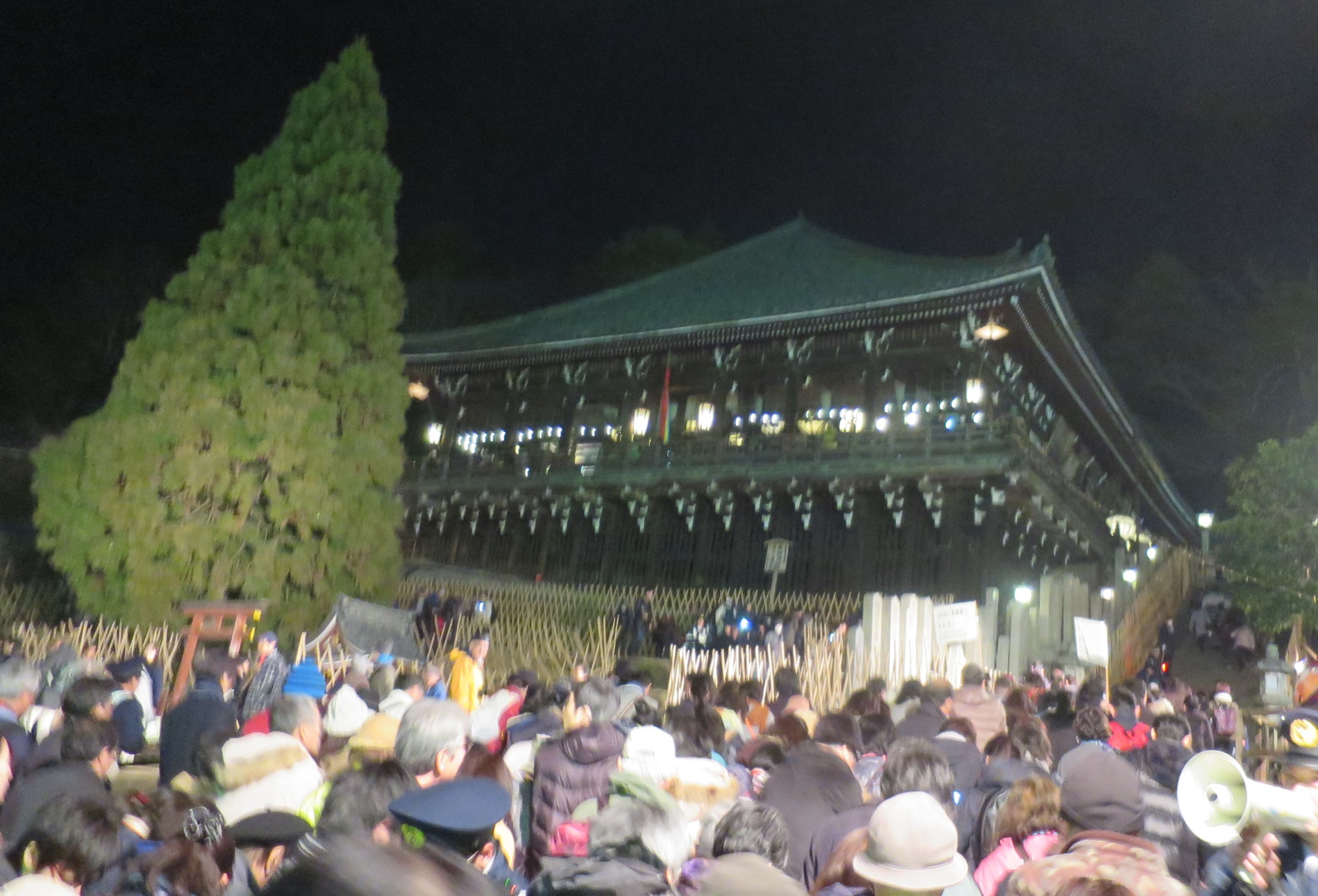
The annual Tōdai-ji Shuni-e ceremony in Nara, Japan, in 2016. Crowd of Buddhists gathered outside the temple. Inside, during the repentance ceremony, eleven monks invoke the Bodhisattva and repeat the Eleven-Faced Avalokitesvara Heart Dharani Sutra for several hours, six times a day.

The text introduces the heart dhāraṇī of the Bodhisattva, Avalokitesvara, as the following lines, translated by Prof. Abe indicate:

世尊我此神咒有大威力。(Bhagavat [World-Honored One, the Buddha], this dhāraṇī of mine [Avalokiteśvara] is impregnated with magnificent power.)
若誦一遍即能除滅四根本罪。(A single recitation will instantaneously eliminate the four cardinal sins)
及五無間令無有餘。(and release all the sinners in the five eternal hells.)
況能如說而修行者。(How much greater power will be attained by the practitioner who studies it as I will describe now!)

Later, the Bodhisattva states:

若有稱念百千俱胝那庾多諸佛名號。復有暫時於我名號至心稱念。彼二功德平等平等。諸有稱念我名號者。一切皆得不退轉地。離一切病脫一切障一切怖畏。及能滅除身語意惡。況能於我所說神咒。受持讀誦如說修行。
(There may be a practitioner who recites the names of all the Buddhas for hundreds, thousands, millions and billions of times. However, if there is a practitioner who recites my name even for a short moment, the latter's merit will equal that accrued, by the practice of the former.... Then much how much greater merit will be attained, by those who chant my dhāraṇī, memorize it and practice it as I will describe now! (Note: Abe's translation is not linear, so it is not possible to parallel each sentence in Chinese followed by the English translation, unlike the previous quote.)

The sutra is used in various Buddhist ceremonies, including the famous Shuni-e ceremony at Tōdai-ji Temple in Nara, Japan. There is no full English translation.

=== Heart-dhāraṇī of Avalokiteśvara-ekadaśamukha ===
The Heart-dhāraṇī of Avalokiteśvara-ekadaśamukha (Chinese:聖十一面觀自在菩薩根本咒/十一面觀音心咒) is the dhāraṇī introduced in Heart-dhāraṇī of Avalokiteśvara-ekadaśamukha Sūtra. Below is the romanized Sanskrit from Indian monk Amoghavajra (around 750 AD) version, Taishō T20n1069_001: (Note: Curiously, on the T20n1969 document just mentioned, the translation of the sutra is in Chinese, except for the end (i.e. paragraph [0142a27]) which is written in Sanskrit IAST. It can be seen that this is indeed the dhāraṇī we are presently discussing.)

namo ratnatrayāya namaḥ āryajñānasāgra-vairocanabhyuhārajaya tathāgatāyārhate samyaksaṃbuddhāya namaḥsarvatathāgatebhyorhatebhyaḥ samyaksaṃbuddhebhyaḥ namaḥāryāvalokiteśvarāya bodhisatvāya mahāsatvāya mahākāruṇikāya tadyathā oṃ dhara dhiri dhuru ite vate śale praśale kusume kusumavale iri viri ciriti jaramapanaya paramaśuddha satva mahākāruṇika svāhā

=== Ekadaśamukha-sūtra ===
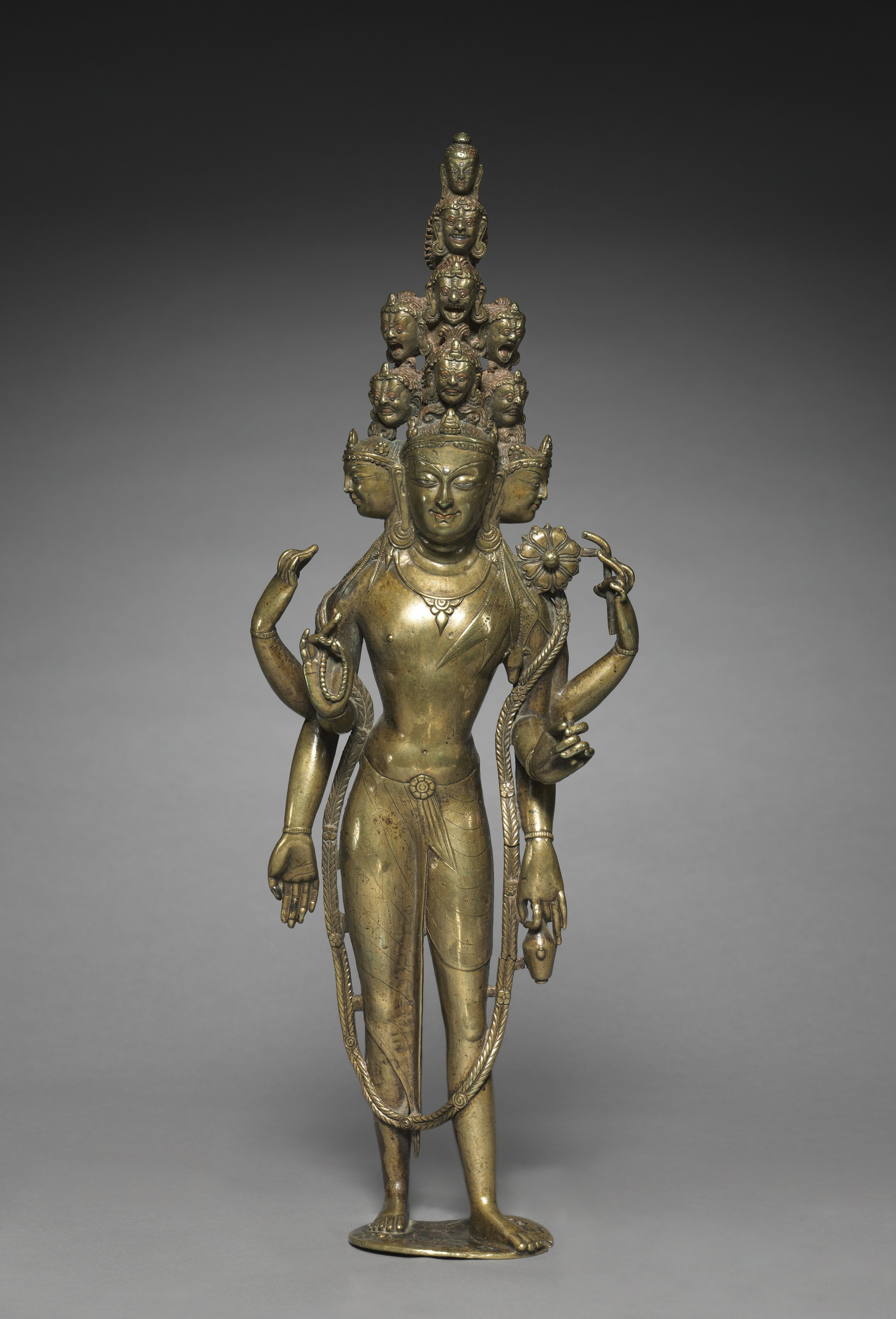
South Asian Eleven Faced Avalokitesvara, circa 1000.

A third version must also be mentioned here. It differs slightly from that of Amoghavajra's quoted above. Here is the romanised version in Sanskrit IAST.

In fact, the Devanagari text is identical to that of Dutt, completed by the IAST transcription :

namo ratnatrayāya ǀ 南无佛陀耶 南无达摩耶 南无僧伽耶

— 南无若那娑伽罗 namo vairocanāya tathāgatāya ǀ 毘卢遮那耶 多他伽多耶, nama āryāvalokiteśvarāya bodhisattvāya mahāsattvāya mahākāruṇikāya ǀ 南无阿利耶跋路 吉帝摄婆罗耶 菩提萨埵耶 摩诃萨埵耶 摩诃伽楼腻伽耶 namaḥ atītānāgatapratyutpa (nnebhyaḥ) sarvatathāgatebhyo'rhad bhyaḥ samyaksaṃbuddhebhyaḥ ǀ 南无萨婆哆他伽帝毘耶 阿罗诃陀毘耶 三藐三佛提毘耶 om (dhara dhara dhiri dhiri) ǀ 多侄他, 唵 陀罗陀罗 地利地利 dhuru dhuru ǀ 豆楼 豆楼 iṭṭe viṭṭe ǀ 壹知 跋知 cale cale ǀ 遮离 遮离 pracale pracale ǀ 钵遮离 钵遮离 (kusume) kusumavare ǀ 鸠蘇咩 鸠蘇摩婆离 ili mili viṭi svāhā ǀ 伊利弥利脂致 莎诃 evaṃ mūlamantraḥ ǀǀ

=== Benefits of reciting the dhāraṇī ===
In the sutra, Avalokiteśvara bodhisattva explains the benefits which come from reciting the dhāraṇī.

Ten main benefits:

1. One's body will be free from illness.
2. One will be constantly remembered by the Buddhas of the ten directions.
3. All wealth, clothing, and food will naturally be abundant without lack.
4. One will be able to defeat all enemies.
5. One will instill compassion in all sentient beings.
6. No poison or fever will be able to harm one.
7. No weapons will be able to injure one.
8. One will not be swept away by water-related disasters.
9. One will not be burned by fire-related disasters.
10. One will not experience untimely death.

Four additional results in this life:

1. At the time of death, one will see the Buddhas of the ten directions.
2. One will never fall into the hells.
3. One will not be harmed by any wild beasts.
4. After death, one will be reborn in the Land of Infinite Life (Amitābha's Pure Land).

Furthermore, the sutra also promises the state of Avinivartaniya (non-retrogression on the path of the bodhisattva, meaning one will not fall back to an earlier state of spiritual development).

== Relationship to the Great Compassion Mantra ==
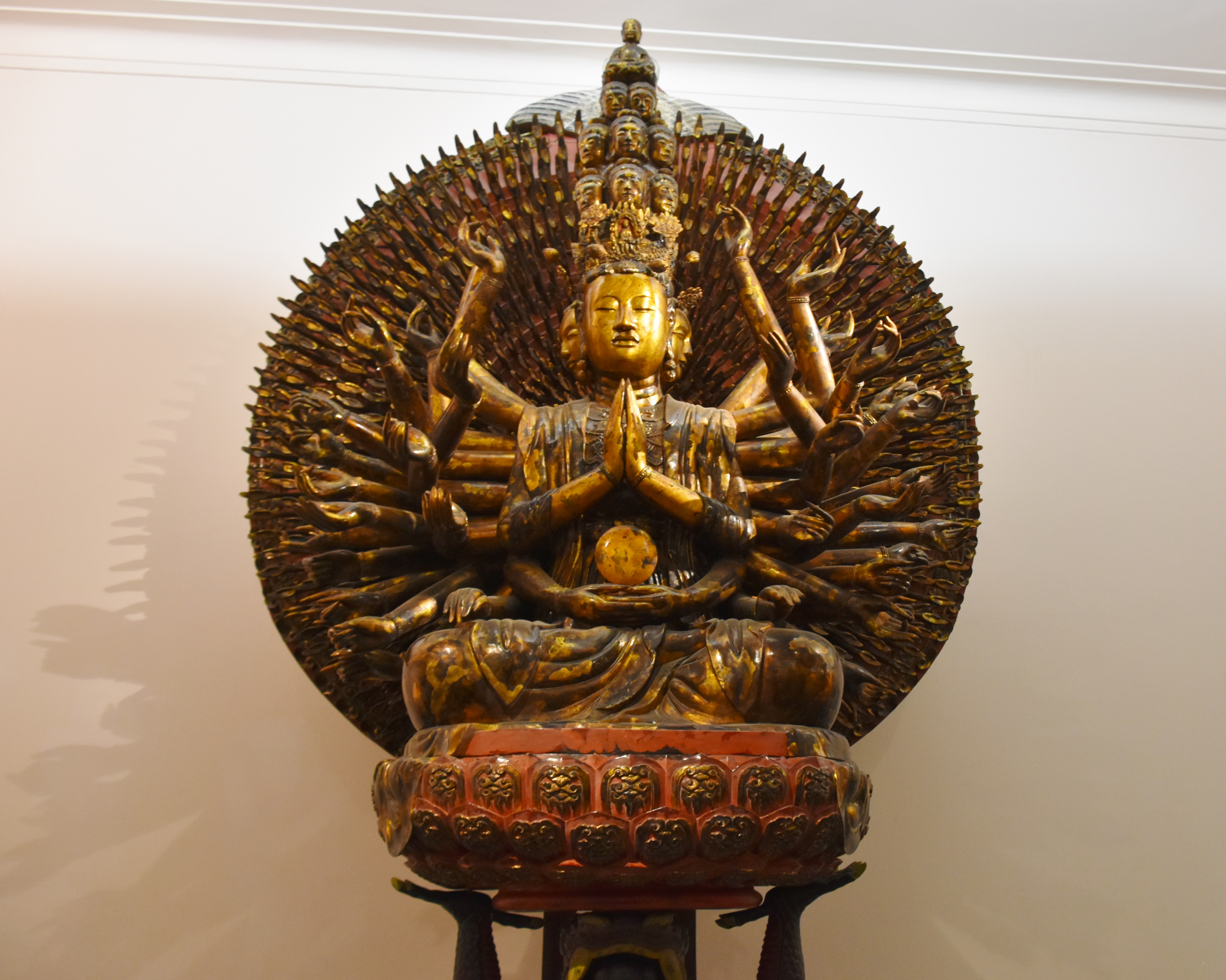
Sculpture representing the Thousand-Armed and Eleven Faced Avalokitesvera sitting on a lotus, painted wood, 1656, Vietnam National Museum of Fine Arts, Hanoi.

It is generally believed that this dhāraṇī has no direct relationship with the Great Compassion Mantra, or Nīlakantha dhāranī in Mahayana Buddhism. However, it is often falsely named as Tibetan Great Compassion Mantra (藏傳大悲咒) or The Great Compassion Mantra in Sanskrit (梵音大悲咒).

In Chinese-speaking countries and in Vietnam, the Eleven-Faced Avalokiteśvara Heart dhāraṇī Sutra is as popular as the Nīlakaṇṭha Dhāraṇī, so much so that they are often confused with each other. The confusion probably arises from the fact that the two dhāraṇī, though distinct, are also referred to by the same alternative title: Great Compassion Mantra. Their respective texts are very different, having only their reference to Avalokitesvara in common. (Note: The Eleven-Faced Avalokitesvara Heart Dharani Sutra is much shorter (less than thirty verses) than the Nīlakaṇṭha Dhāraṇī (eighty/one hundred verses).)

Some people believe that the dhāraṇī is told by the Eleven-Faced Avalokitesvara, an esoteric bodhisattva in Tibetan Buddhism, and that it is the equivalent Tibetan version of The Great Compassion Mantra in Mahayana Buddhism. This is why it is often being referred to as Tibetan Great Compassion Mantra, while the sung text currently discussed is in Sanskrit. However, this opinion is not accepted by most Mahayana Buddhists. (Note: The Nīlakaṇṭha Dhāraṇī is recited daily as part of the ritual of Mahāyāna Buddhism, whereas the Eleven-Faced Avalokitesvara Heart Dharani Sutra is only recited on the occasion of certain Buddhist celebrations, such as, for example, the Shuni-e (修二会), an annual ceremony in Japan.)

The title Eleven-Faced Avalokitesvara Heart Dharani Sutra is due to the Japanese historian Ryuichi Abe. The dhāraṇī is also known with the title Tibetan Great Compassion Mantra (藏傳大悲咒), which suggests a Tibetan.

== In Buddhist music ==
=== About the text ===
The sung version presents several variants between the three known versions in Sanskrit, in Chinese and Tibetan, as already mentioned (see section "Several versions").

The text of the sung version of the dhāraṇī (only in Sanskrit) appears in N. Dutt's Gilgit Manuscripts, volume I p. 148 of the digitized version accessible via archive.org, (Note: Dutt did not translate the text into English, which is reconstituted in Sanskrit. Thus, in the mentioned book, the numbering in Sanskrit Devanagari is: "३८" (p.39 and p.148 of the whole), lines 7-13, paragraphs 2-3, read online) the Chinese is that of Amoghavajra already mentioned, and the Tibetan is by an unidentified translator. The lyrics of this sung version are always interpreted in Sanskrit, regardless of the countries and interpreters.

=== One Song Two titles ===
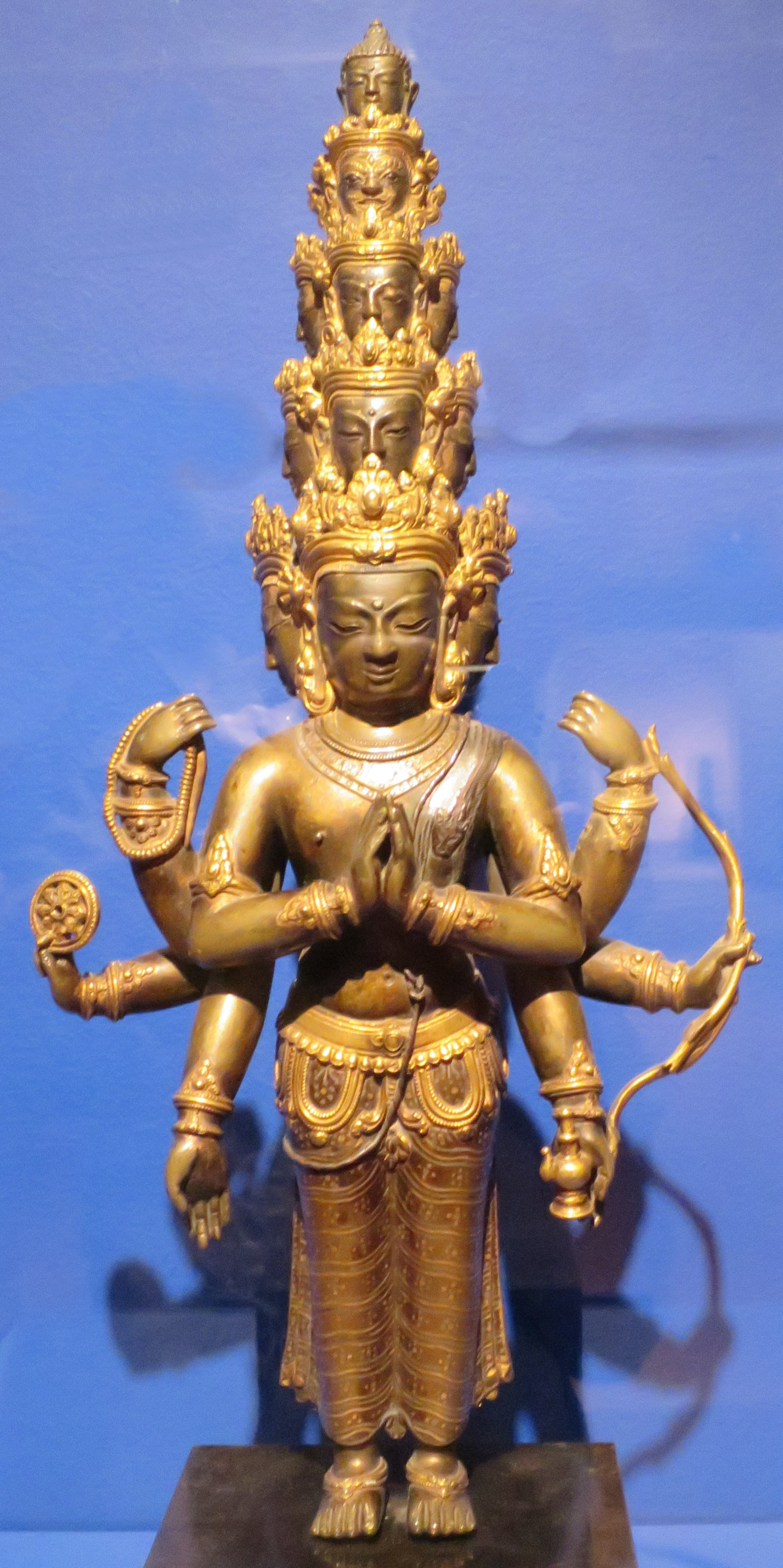
Bodhisattva Avalokiteshvara with Eleven Heads, gilt bronze with copper, gold, silver inlay and pigment, Tibet, 16th century. Norton Simon Museum. The eleven faces symbolize the ten directions of space (the four cardinal directions, the four intercardinal directions, the nadir and the zenith, that the Boddhisattva can observe simultaneously.

There are several musical scores, whose tempo varies (slow or fast) depending on the performers. The chanting of this dhāraṇī is one of the most popular and famous piece of Buddhist music in Chinese-speaking countries and in Vietnam. Its popularity is probably due to the fact that it sung by famous Asian performers among Buddhists, such as the Nepalese-Tibetan bhikkhunī Ani Chöying Drölma, or the Malaysian-Chinese singer Imee Ooi. (Note: See the web links to recordings of these two performers provided at the end of this article.)

However, many recordings of this chant is falsely named Tibetan Great Compassion Mantra (藏傳大悲咒) or The Great Compassion Mantra in Sanskrit (梵音大悲咒) by Chinese-language publishing brands.

Following the development of the internet in recent decades, the number of online postings by religious organisations is constantly increasing. Tens of thousands of sites offer the same interpretation, sometimes choreographed, some of which have several million views.

The fact that a dharani including in its title: Avalokiteśvara with eleven faces is the subject of a real craze to the point of being assimilated to the "Nīlakaṇṭha" can easily be understood. Indeed, the scholar Lokesh Chandra wrote:

The Thousand-armed Avalokiteśvara with eleven heads is the most popular form. The number of heads increases to twenty five, and sometimes the crown bears upto five hundred heads.

=== English translation ===
Here is the English translation of the most popular sung text in Chinese speaking countries and in Vietnam, realized from the romanized Sanskrit (or IAST) Amogavajra's version. (Note: The text of Amogavajra has been slightly modified (a few words), we don't know by whom, nor when (because this sung text is not dated), nor why ( perhaps following copying or transcription errors, or to make match the text and the musical rhythm)) The numbers in brackets have been added, as the sentences (or verses) in the original are not numbered: (Note: No English translation from a reliable published source could be found (there don't seem to be any, and those found on the web are incomplete), the one presented here was made for the purpose of this article.)

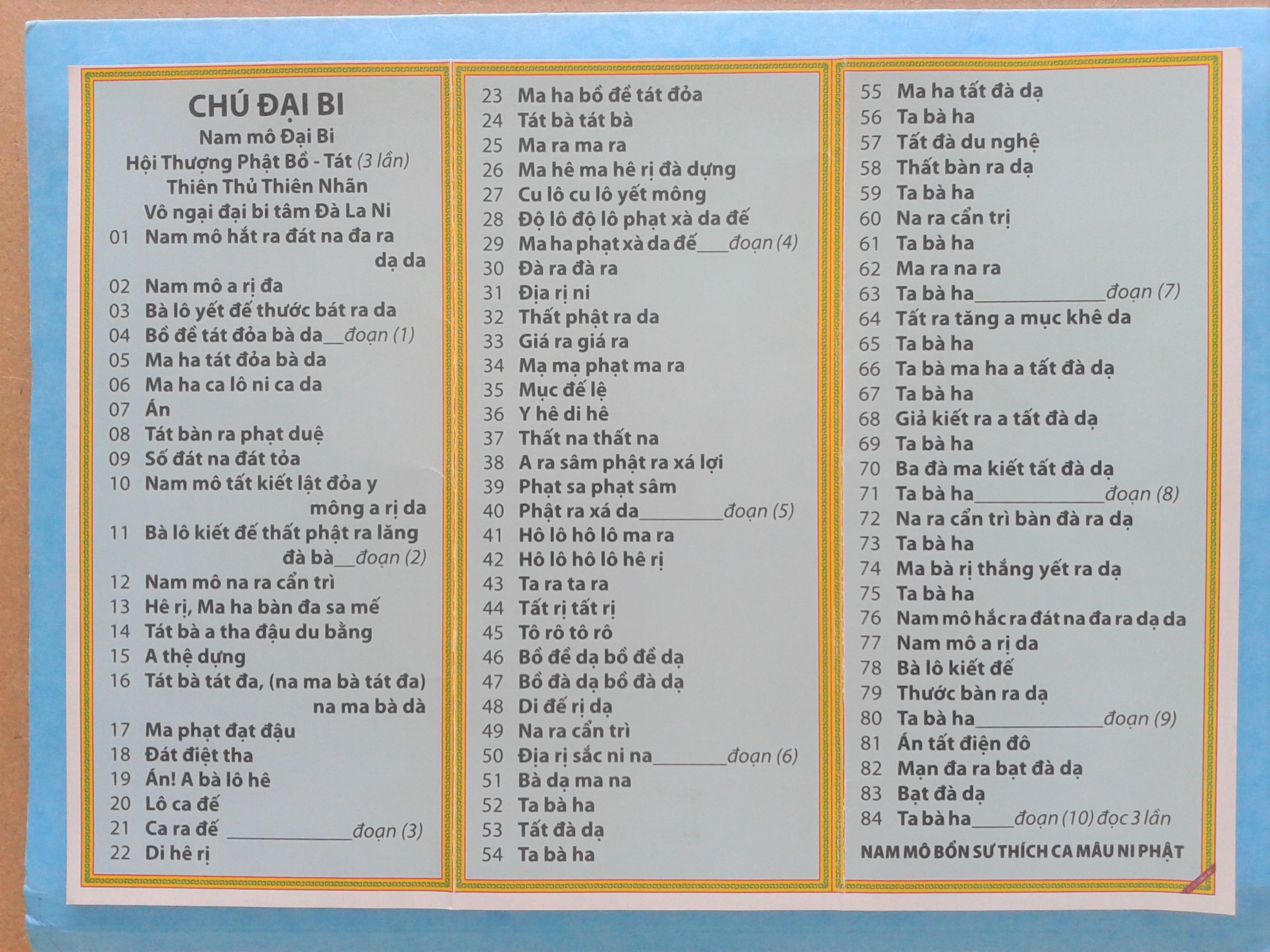
Great Compassion Mantra (Chinese: 大悲咒, Dàbēi zhòu; Vietnamese: Chú Đại Bi). In Chinese-speaking countries and in Vietnam, this text is as popular as the Eleven-Faced Avalokiteśvara Heart dhāraṇī Sutra, with which it is often confused. This confusion probably stems from the fact that the two dhāraṇī are often incorrectly referred to by the same title: Great Compassion Mantra. The text presented above is the Vietnamese version, a transliteration of the Chinese one. We note that it consists of 84 verses, whereas the Eleven-Faced Avalokiteśvara Heart dhāraṇī has only 21, 24 or 26 verses depending on the version.

1. Namo Ratna Trayāya (Homage to the Triple Gem)
2. Namaḥ Ārya Jñāna Sāgara (Homage to the ocean of noble wisdom)
3. Vairocana (The Luminous One or The Illuminator (Note: In Sanskrit « vairocana वैरोचन is an adjective meaning solar, luminous. It is also the name of the cosmic Buddha Vairocana, but in this case it is not him because the dhāraṇī is dedicated to Avalokiteśvara.))
4. Vyūha Rājāya (To the King of the Manifestations. (Note: A Tibetan version proposes « Buddha Rājāya » (King of Buddhas) instead of Vyūha Rājāya. This does not seem to be correct because Avalokiteśvara is a Bodhisattva, not a Buddha. On the other hand, some translations render it as «King of the host», which refers to the Hindu meaning of the word Vyūha. This is why it seems more coherent to opt for the Buddhist meaning.))
5. Tathāgatāya (To the Tathāgata)
6. Arhate (To the Arhat)
7. Samyaksam Buddhāya (To the perfectly awakened one)
8. Namo Sarwa Tathāgatebhyaḥ (Homage to all Tathāgatas (Note: All Tathāgatas is a synonym for all the Buddhas of the past, present and future))
9. Arahatabhyah (To the Arhats)
10. Samyaksam Buddhebhyaḥ (To the fully and perfectly awakened ones )
11. Namo Arya Avalokiteśvarāya (Homage to Noble Avalokiteśvara )
12. Bodhisattvāya (To the Bodhisattva)
13. Mahasattvāya (To the Great)
14. Mahakarunikāya (To the Greatly Compassionate one)
15. Tadyathā. Ōṃ (Thus. Om)
16. Dhara Dhara, Dhiri Dhiri, Dhuru Dhuru (Sustain us, Sustain us, Sustain us (Note: The three words Dhara Dhara, Dhiri Dhiri, Dhuru Dhuru, have been translated as (Sustain us, Sustain us, Sustain us) for the following reason: Lokesh Chandra, in his book The Thousand-armed Avalokiteśvara , p. 188, (see refs. in the Works cited section), wrote the following comment about the four words «Sara, Siri, Suru, Muru» translated as (Come, Come, Come, Come), which appear in the Nilakantha Dharani: The last three words (i.e siri, suru, muru) are in intentional vocalic variation for thaumaturgic effect, to impel the Deity to descend. Muru2 is a jingling duplication of suru2 for a charismatic finale in an unknowable assonance. Later Vedic texts say: parokṣa-priyāḥ devāḥ « The gods love the cryptic » So, from sara2 to muru2 is the cryptic element to implore Avalokiteśvara to be pleased to descend to bless; and shower His grace, His mystique to transform the deep within the human self. The same seems to be true here, concerning the three words (repeated twice): «Dhara, Dhari, Dhuru» (sometimes rendered as Dara, Diri Duru), as «Dhara» is the only word among the three that follows the rules of Sanskrit, i.e., the verb «dhṛ» in the imperative-active-2nd person Thus, it seems that « Dhara, Dhiri, Dhuru » can be considered in Chandra's words: « as a jingling duplication and a cryptic element to implore Avalokiteśvara, all the Buddhas and the Arhats ».))
17. Iṭṭe vitte ( May we have the strength )
18. Cale Cale (or Itte cale) ( To move forward, to move forward )
19. Pracale Pracale ( To move forward further, to move further along the path )
20. Kusumē, Kusumavare ( Where to pick the fruits . (Note: Verses 19-21: The Sanskrit word «kusuma कुसुम» has several meanings, including «flower and fruit». The latter seems more appropriate to the context, as it evokes the Path and Fruits. Thus, verses 19 and 20 complement each other, being concluded by verse 21, in which the words translated as «Who bring the flaming understanding» mean the "liberation"» to which the practice of the Noble Eightfold Path leads.))
21. Ili Milli Citi jvalam Apanāye. Svāhā. (Who bring the blazing understanding. Hail!).

Two interpreters having contributed to the popularity of the sung version

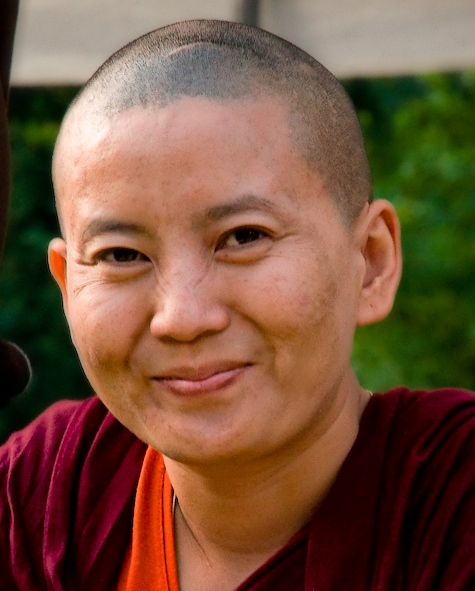
Ani Chöying Drölma

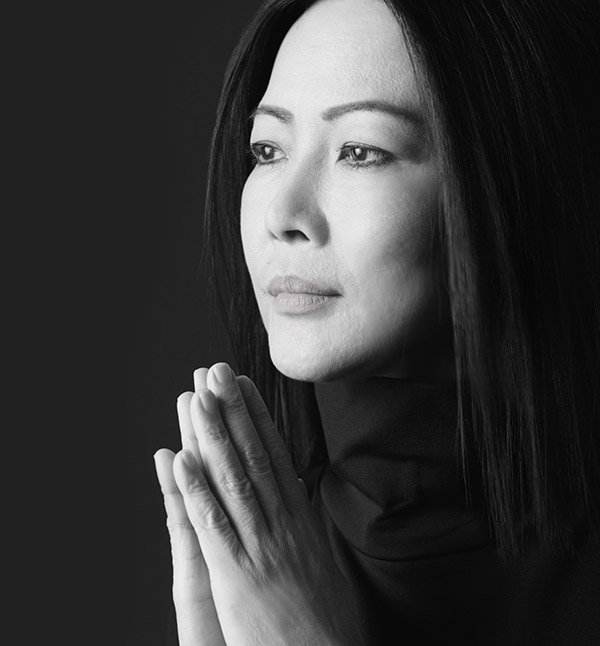
Imee Ooi
- Ani Chöying Drölma is a Nepalese-Tibetan Buddhist bhikkhunī. In concert and recordings, she performs the sung version of the Eleven-Faced Avalokiteśvara Heart dhāraṇī Sutra, in Sanskrit, but entitled Namo Ratna Great Compassion Mantra.
- Imee Ooi is a Malaysian-Chinese singer, who has recorded the Eleven-Faced Avalokiteśvara Heart dhāraṇī Sutra in Sanskrit, but entitled Arya Ekadasa-Mukha Dharani which she also performs in concert.

== Works cited ==
- Ryuichi Abe (1999). The Weaving of Mantra: Kukai and the Construction of Esoteric Buddhist Discourse. Columbia University Press. pp. 170–176. ISBN 0-231-11286-6..
- Lokesh Chandra, Lokesh (1988). The Thousand-armed Avalokiteśvara. New Delhi: Abhinav Publications, Indira Gandhi National Centre for the Arts. ISBN 81-7017-247-0...
- Nalinaksha Dutt, ed. (1939). Gilgit Manuscripts. Vol. I. Srinagar / Kashmir: Calcutta Oriental Press. pp. 58–60, 148.
- Julian F. Pas (January 1995). Visions of Sukhavati. SUNY Press. p. 369. ISBN 9780791425190...
