= Nigatsu-dō =

Coordinates: 34°41′21″N 135°50′39″E

Nigatsu-dō (二月堂)

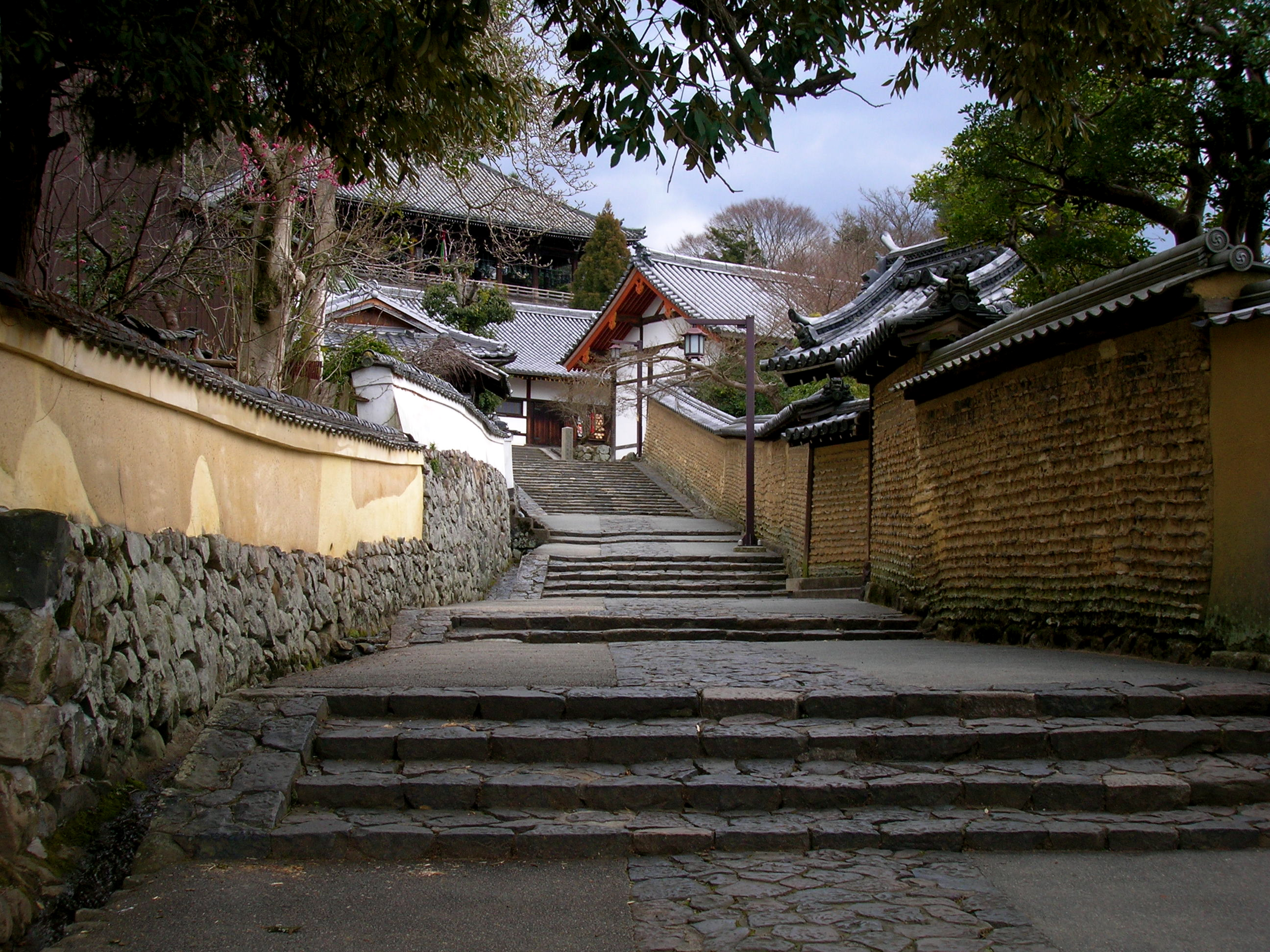
The stairs leading to Nigatsu-dō Hall

Nigatsu-dō (Japanese: 二月堂 lit. 'The Hall of the Second Month') is one of the important structures of Tōdai-ji, a temple in Nara, Japan. Nigatsu-dō is located to the east of the Great Buddha Hall, on the hillside of Mount Wakakusa. It includes several other buildings in addition to the specific hall named Nigatsu-dō, thus comprising its own sub-complex within Tōdai-ji.

== History ==
Nigatsu-dō was founded by a monk by the name of Sanetada in 752, but the Buddhist monk Jitchu, a pupil of Rōben, later introduced a repentance service dedicated to the image of the eleven-faced Bodhisattva, Kannon in 760. It has taken place as an annual rite since 760 without any break. The service has come to be known as Shuni-e (修二会 lit. 'Second-Month Service'), as it was held in the second month of the traditional lunisolar calendar. At present, it starts on 1 March and ends on the 15th of the month. Omizutori, which means taking sacred water, has become the popular name of the ceremony.

While the first Shuni-e service is said to have been held by Jichu in another temple in 752, the original construction of Nigatsu-dō hall is estimated to have completed only somewhere between 756 and 772. Nigatsu-dō was destroyed in 1667 due to a fire.

- 1667 (Kanbun 7): After fire destroyed the main temple structure, work on rebuilding Nigatsu-dō (二月堂) at Nara commenced.

Re-construction of Nigatsu-do is completed in 1669. In 1944, it was chosen by Japan as one of the most important cultural aspects of the country.

== Architecture ==
The front part of the fall projects out over a sloping area and is supported by columns assembled under the floor using the kakezukuri technique.

Although the hall was saved from civil wars in 1180 and 1567 in which the Great Buddha Hall was lost, it was burnt down during the Shuni-e service of 1667. The hall was rebuilt two years later.

The current main hall of Nigatsu-dō is a designated National Treasure. The hall holds two Kannons, a large one and a small one, although both of them are classified as Hibutsu (秘仏) – "secret Buddhas" – and therefore are not publicly shown.

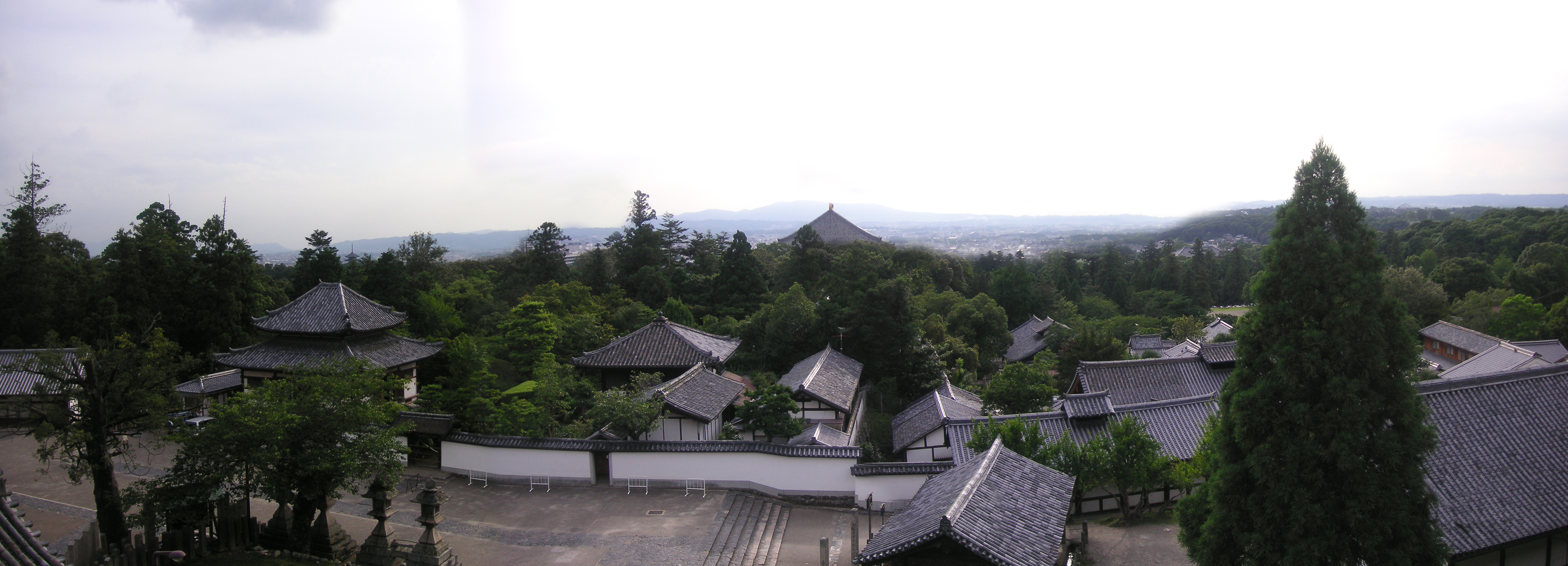
Panorama over Nigatsu-dō grounds and Nara City

== Gallery ==
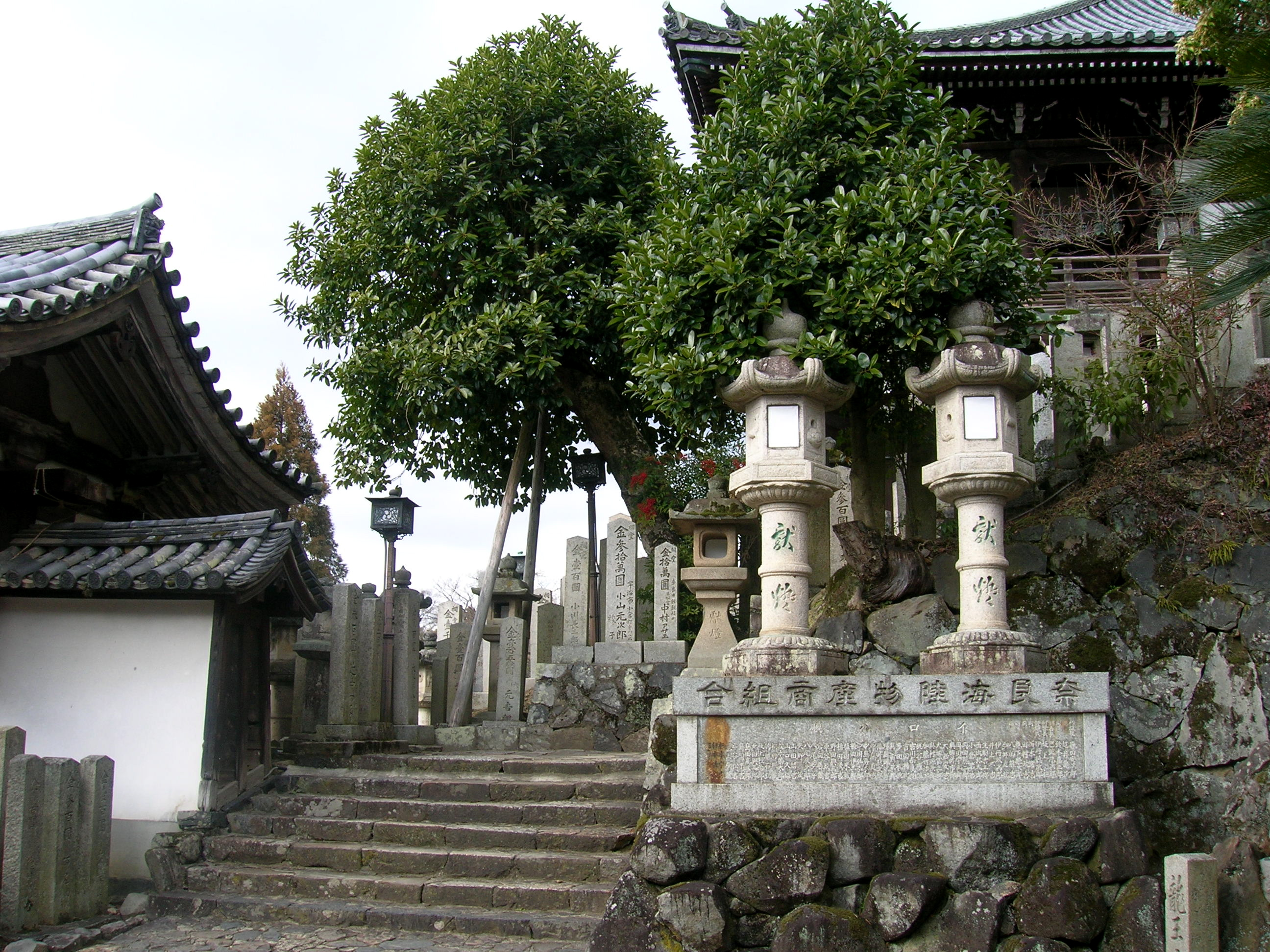
The east entrance to Nigatsu-dō Hall

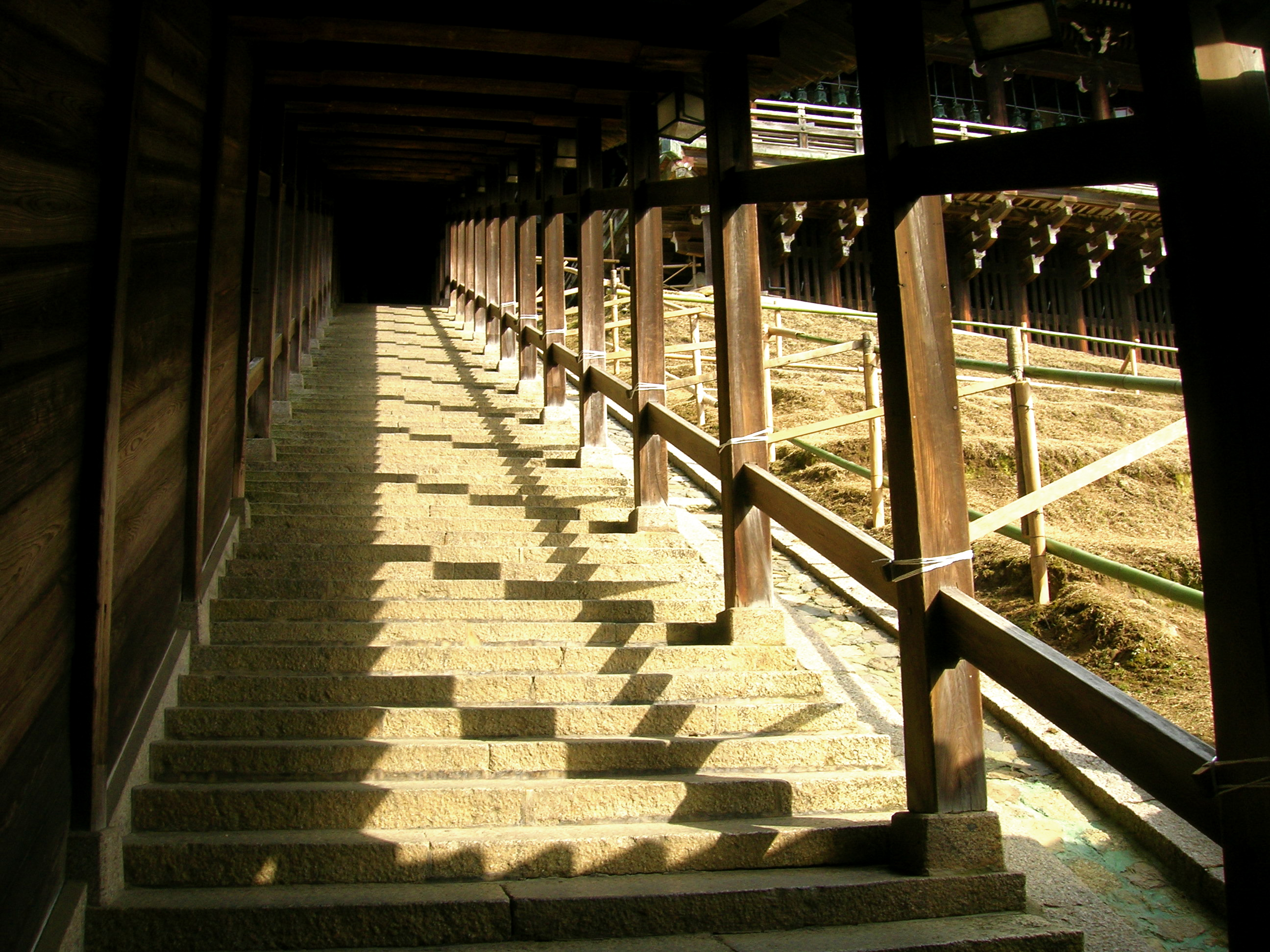
Wooden stair entrance to Nigatsu-dō

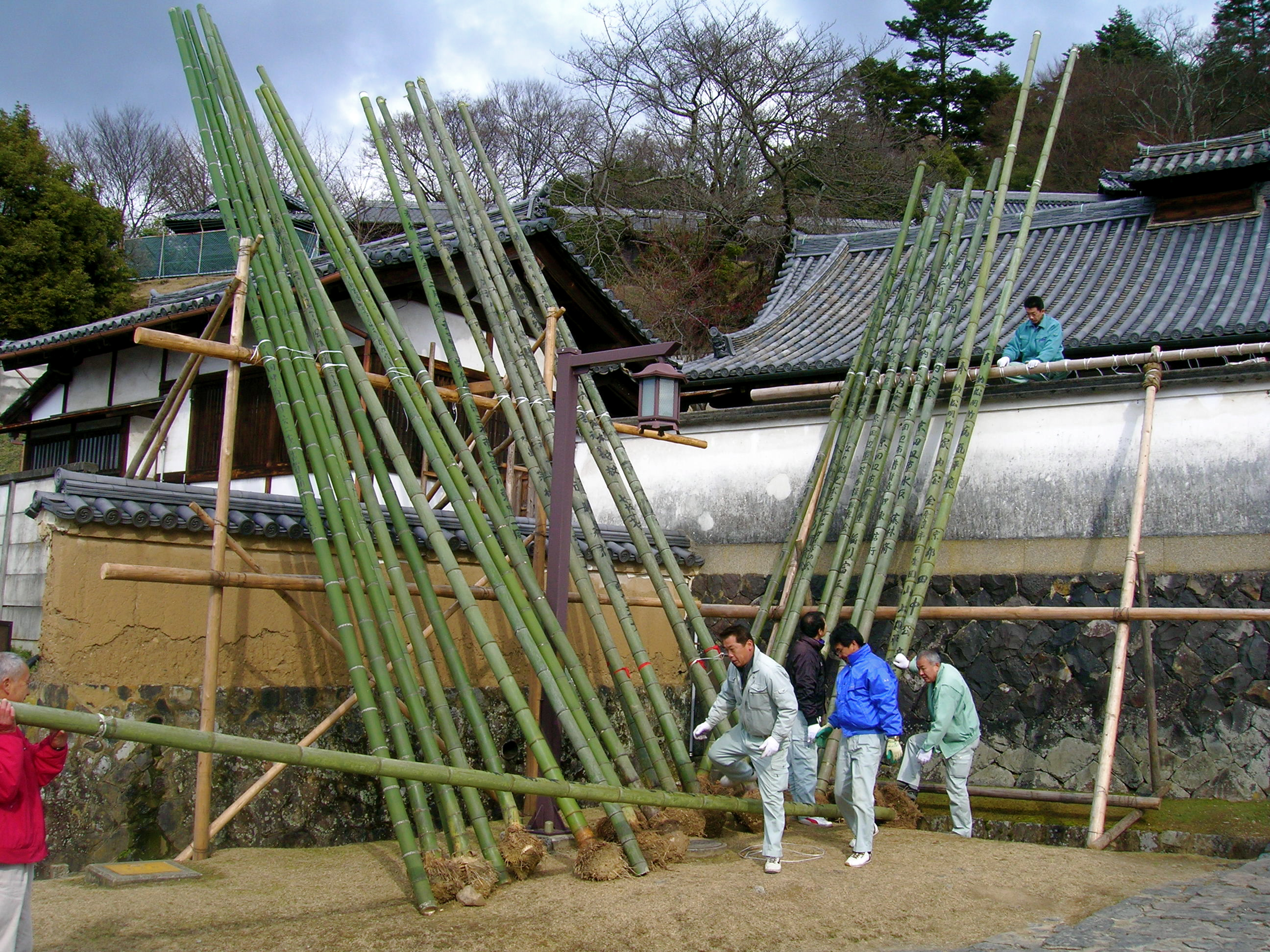
Nigatsu-dō winter maintenance work

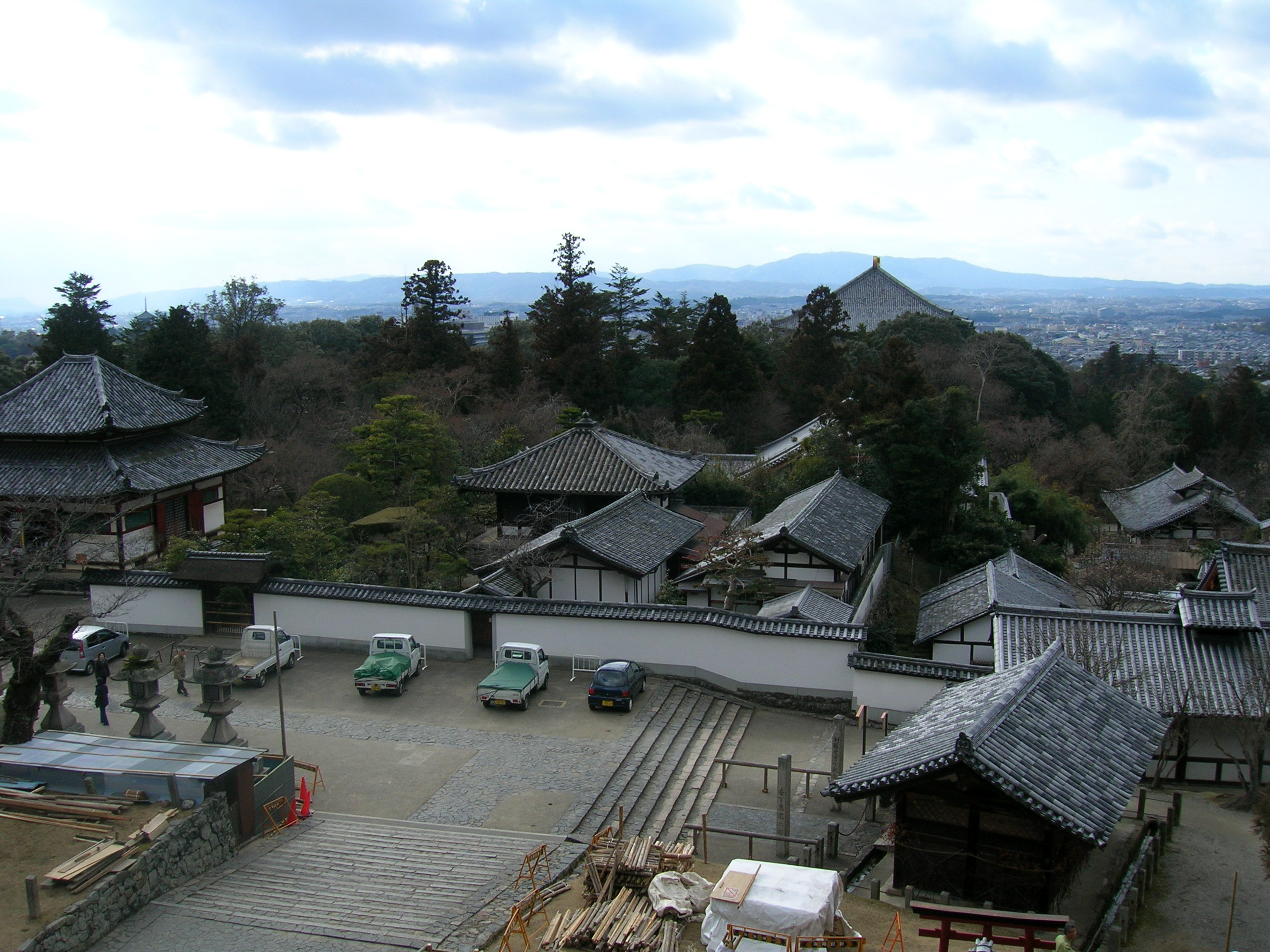
View from the balcony of Nigatsu-dō

== See also ==
- Omizutori, the climax of Shuni-e service which takes place on 12 March every year
