= Omizutori =

Festival in Japan

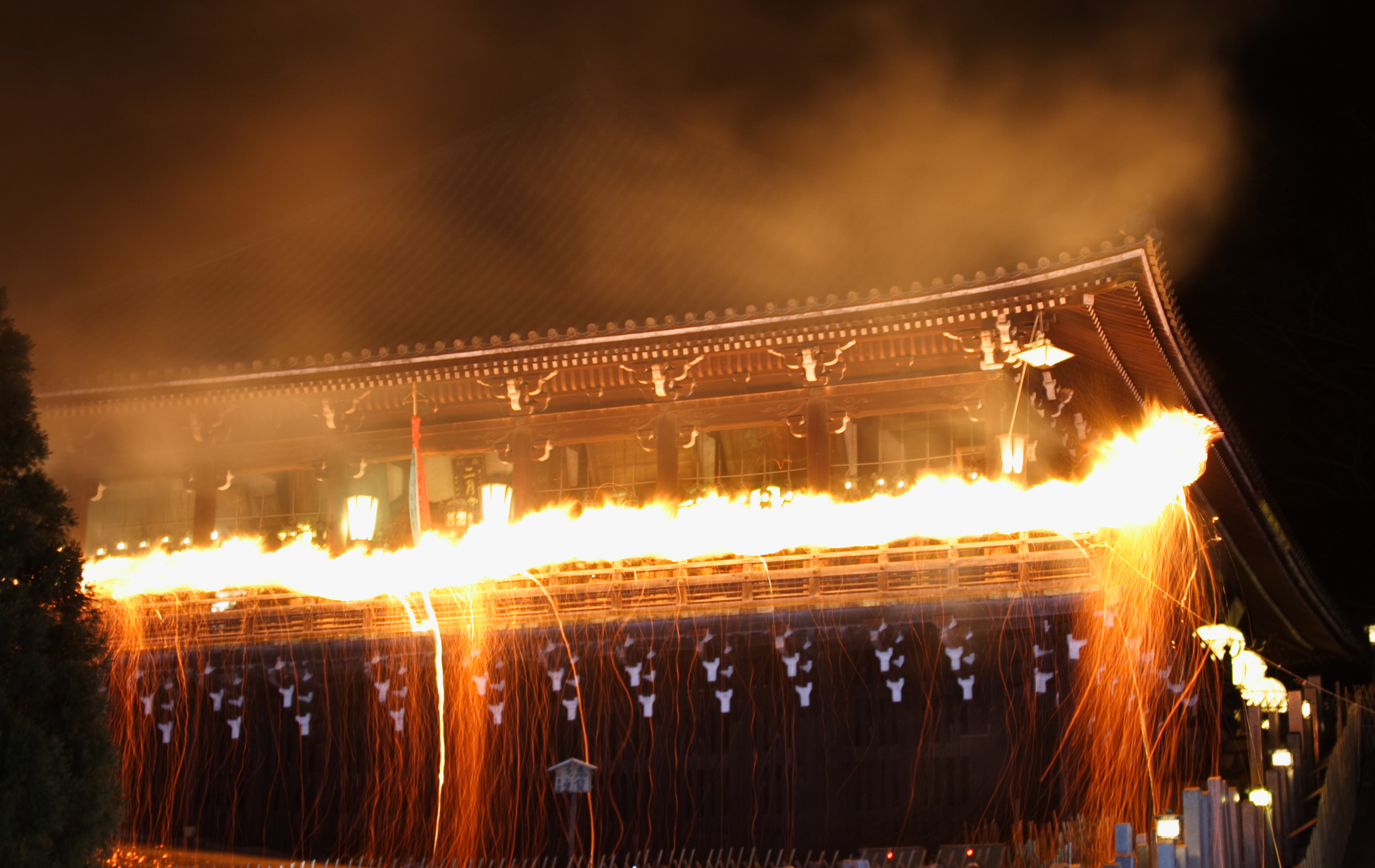
In the main event of Omizutori at Nigatsu-do, monks carry torches across the balcony.

Omizutori (お水取り), or the annual sacred water-drawing festival, is a Japanese Buddhist festival that takes place in the Nigatsu-dō of Tōdai-ji, Nara, Japan. The festival is the final rite in observance of the two-week-long Shuni-e ceremony. This ceremony is to cleanse the people of their sins as well as to usher in the spring of the new year. Once the Omizutori is completed, the cherry blossoms have started blooming and spring has arrived.

== Description ==
The rite occurs on the last night of the Shuni-e ceremony, when monks bearing torches come to the Wakasa Well, underneath the Nigatsu-dō Hall, which according to legend only springs forth water once a year. The ceremony has occurred in the Nigatsu-do of the imperial temple at Nara, of the Todai-ji, since it was first founded. These annual festivals have been dated back to 752. The earliest known records of the use of an incense seal during the religious rites in Japan were actually used during one Omizutori.

Eleven priests, who are called Renhyoshu, are appointed in December of the previous year to participate in the Omizutori festivals. Much preparation goes into this yearly festival, and the priests are tasked with cleaning the sites for the rituals, making circuit pilgrimages to surrounding shrines and temples, and preparing various goods that are used in the rituals. During the time leading up to Omizutori, the priests are forbidden to speak at all or leave their lodgings. Each priest is very firm in the practice of his duty in specific, strict orders and in preparing himself for the ceremonies to come.

Torches are lit at the start of the Omizutori, during the ittokuka, which is held in the early morning on the first of March. There is an evening ceremony, called Otaimatsu, in which young ascetics brandish large torches that are burning. While waving the torches in the air, they draw large circles with the fire it emits. It is believed that if a person viewing the ceremony is showered with the sparks from the fire, the person will then be protected from evil things.

Omizutori is the largest ceremony on the night of 12 March. The next day, the rite of drawing of the water is held with an accompaniment of ancient Japanese music. The monks draw water, which only springs up from the well in front of the temple building on this specific day, and offer it first to the Buddhist deities, Bodhisattva Kannon, and then offer it to the public. It is believed that the water, being blessed, can cure ailments. The Omizutori ceremony is the acceptance of water from a well. This well is said to be connected by a tunnel to the town of Obama on the coast of the Sea of Japan. The water is sent from Obama annually by the priests of the syncretic Jinguji temple in Obama in a ceremony called "the sending of the water". The water is actually drawn into two pots, one pot containing water from the previous year and another that contains the water from all previous ceremonies. From the pot of water that holds the water of the current year, a very small amount of water is poured into the pot, which holds the mixture of water from all of the previous ceremonies. The resulting water mixture is preserved each year, and this process has taken place for over 1,200 years.

== The Legend of Omizutori ==
There are different legends of the origin of Omizutori. One of these legends suggests that the founder of Shuni-e, Jitchu, invited 13,700 of the gods to the ceremony. One of the gods, Onyu-myojin was late to the ceremony because he was fishing on the Onyu River. To make up for the fact that he was late, he then offered scented water from the Onyu River, and the water suddenly sprung up from the spot where the god once stood.

The story of how Shuni-e came to be continues to portray the original founder of Shuni-e, Jitchu, as the central character. It is told that the priest, Jitchu, made a journey deep into the mountains of Kasagi in 751, where he witnessed celestial beings performing a ceremony that was meant to cleanse and ask for repentance. Jitchu was so overwhelmed by the ceremony that he decided to bring the rite to the human world. He was warned that this would be a daunting task, but his desire was so strong that he believed he could overcome the task of transferring the rite between the heavens and the world of man. He decided that if he could perform the religious ceremony 1,000 times a day at running speed, he could bring the god's ceremony into his world.

The festival was held from March 1 to March 14, 2010.
