= Shuni-e =

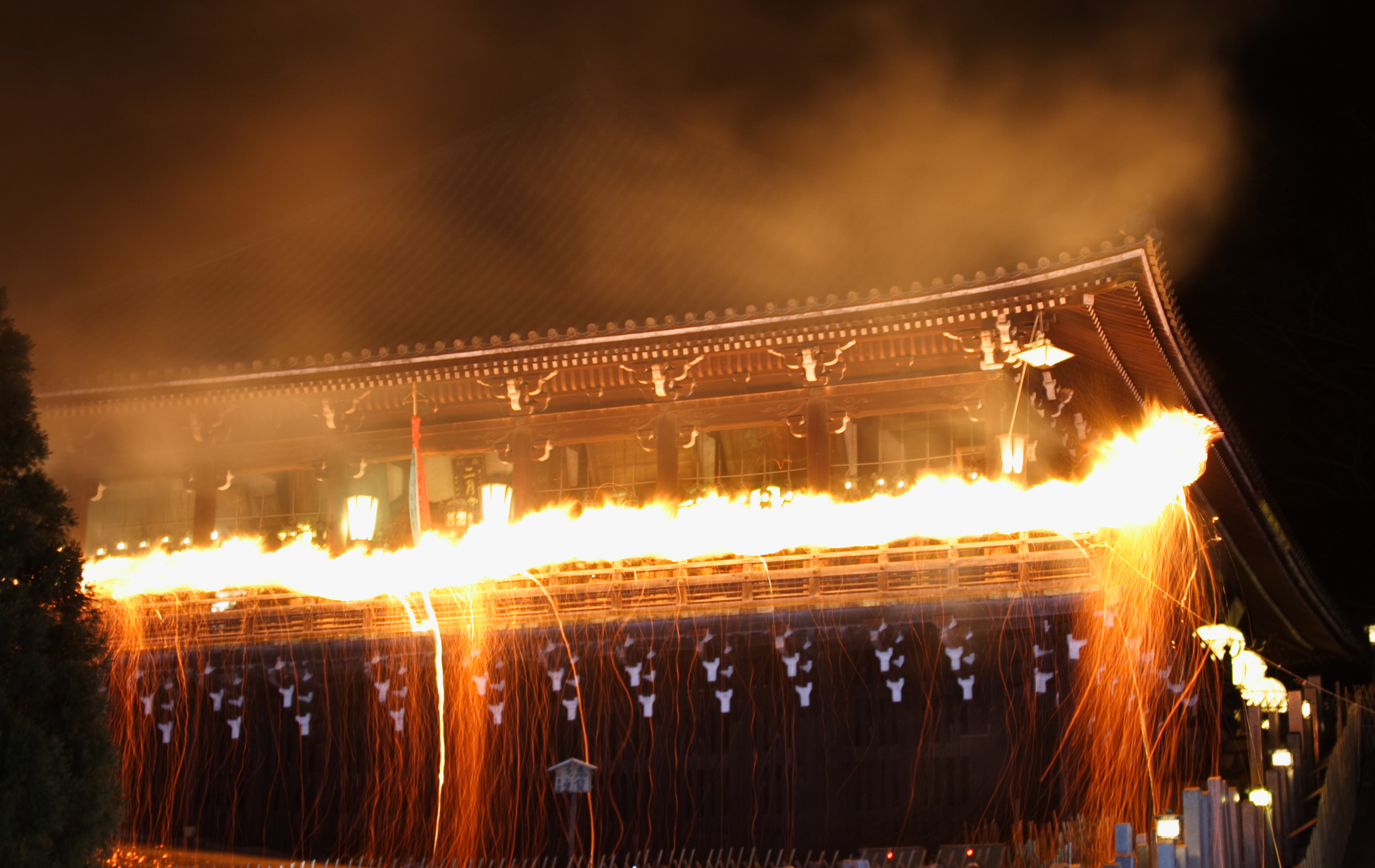
Shuni-e at Tōdai-ji

The Shuni-e (修二会; literally "Second-Month Service") is a ceremony held each year at certain Buddhist temples in Japan. The name comes from its observance in the second month of the lunisolar calendar. Today, the service is usually held in either February or March, depending on temples.

One of the popularly known Shuni-e is the one at Tōdai-ji in Nara, held between March 1 and the morning of March 15. This article describes below the details of the Shuni-e held at Tōdai-ji.

The Tōdai-ji Shuni-e ceremony was originally started by Jitchū, a monk of the Kegon school, as a devotion and confession to the Bodhisattva Kannon (Skt: Avalokiteśvara). It has continued every year since 752, though it was held at a different site until the Nigatsu-dō was completed in 772. The ceremony is also known as Omizutori (お水取り), the name of its climactic ritual.

The ceremony actually comprises an array of ceremonies centered on repentance to the Bodhisattva Kannon and prayers for the welfare of society. Two of the best known ceremonies of the Shuni-e are the Fire Ceremony (otaimatsu in Japanese) and the Omizutori, or "Water Ceremony".

== Origin ==
The origins of the Tōdai-ji Shuni-e ceremony are unclear, but an illustrated text in 1586 cites a legend surrounding the monk Jitchū. According to the story, Jitchū wandered into a cave in the year 751, and the cave led him to the Buddhist heaven realm of Tushita (Tosotsuten in Japanese). There, in the cave, he observed 49 shrines of devotion to various Buddhist figures, and heavenly beings (see deva) frantically running between shrines over and over to pay obeisance and offerings. One particularly grand shrine was devoted to the Bodhisattva Kannon, in his eleven-faced form, crowded with beings taking part in a grand repentance ritual.

Jitchū was so moved by the ceremony, he asked one of the heavenly beings if he could take part, but was refused because time in Tushita Heaven is much faster than on Earth. According to the being, one day in Tushita would be equivalent to 400 years.

However, Jitchū resolved to reproduce the ceremony anyway, and after further adventures, establishes the Shuni-e rite, devoted to the 11-faced form of Kannon Bodhisattva.

Sources show that the Empress Dowager, Kōmyō, was a devout patroness of Jitchū, and she originally allowed the use of her administrative office to perform the rite. When she died later, and her office was abolished, Jitchū moved the rite to the current location of the Nigatsu-dō Hall in the temple of Tōdai-ji in Nara, Japan. The liturgy and ceremony remains largely unchanged during this time.

== Repentance Ceremony ==
The core repentance ritual of the Shuni-e, closed to the public, is performed by a select group of eleven monks called rengyōshū, who engage in a repentance session six times a day:

1. late evening (shoya)
2. midnight (yahan)
3. after midnight (goya)
4. dawn (jinjo)
5. midday (nitchu)
6. dusk (nichimotsu)

In each session, the monks gather in the central worship hall (naijin) before the altar of the eleven-faced Kannon Bodhisattva. The shoya, or late evening session, is the longest, comprising 3 hours. The liturgy and format of all sessions is based on the Buddhist text, the Eleven-Faced Avalokitesvara Heart Dharani Sutra.

All sessions consist of the following format:

- Repentance.
- Invocation of the Bodhisattva's name.
- Invocation of the dharani from the sutra above.
- Vows to strive to benefit all beings.

The recitation of the Bodhisattva's name comes from this verse of the Dharani Sutra above:

There may be a practitioner who recites the names of all the Buddhas for hundreds, thousands, millions, and billions of times. However, if there is a practitioner who recites my name for even a short moment, the latter's merit will equal that accrued by the former...

== The Fire Ceremony ==
Every night, ten select believers (eleven on March 12) shoulder large pine torches as long as 8 meters and weighing as much as 80 kilograms. Girded with swords and staves, the torch-bearers climb a flight of stairs and run along the balcony of the Nigatsu-dō, showering sparks on the public below. It is thought that these sacred sparks will protect the recipient from evil. The monks also chant, perform ritual circumambulation, and wave swords to ward off evil spirits.

== The Water Ceremony ==
Underneath the Nigatsu-dō is the Wakasa Well, from which, according to legend, water springs forth only once a year. After the final night of the Fire Ceremony, the monks gather water from the well around 2am by torchlight, after which the water is offered to Kannon and to the general public. It is popularly believed that this water, being sacred, can cure ailments. The water from the well is actually gathered into two pots, one containing water from the previous year, and another containing water from all previous observances of the ceremony.

== See also ==
- Omizutori（お水取り）
