= Kontai-ji =

Buddhist temple in Kyoto Prefecture, Japan

- 金胎寺
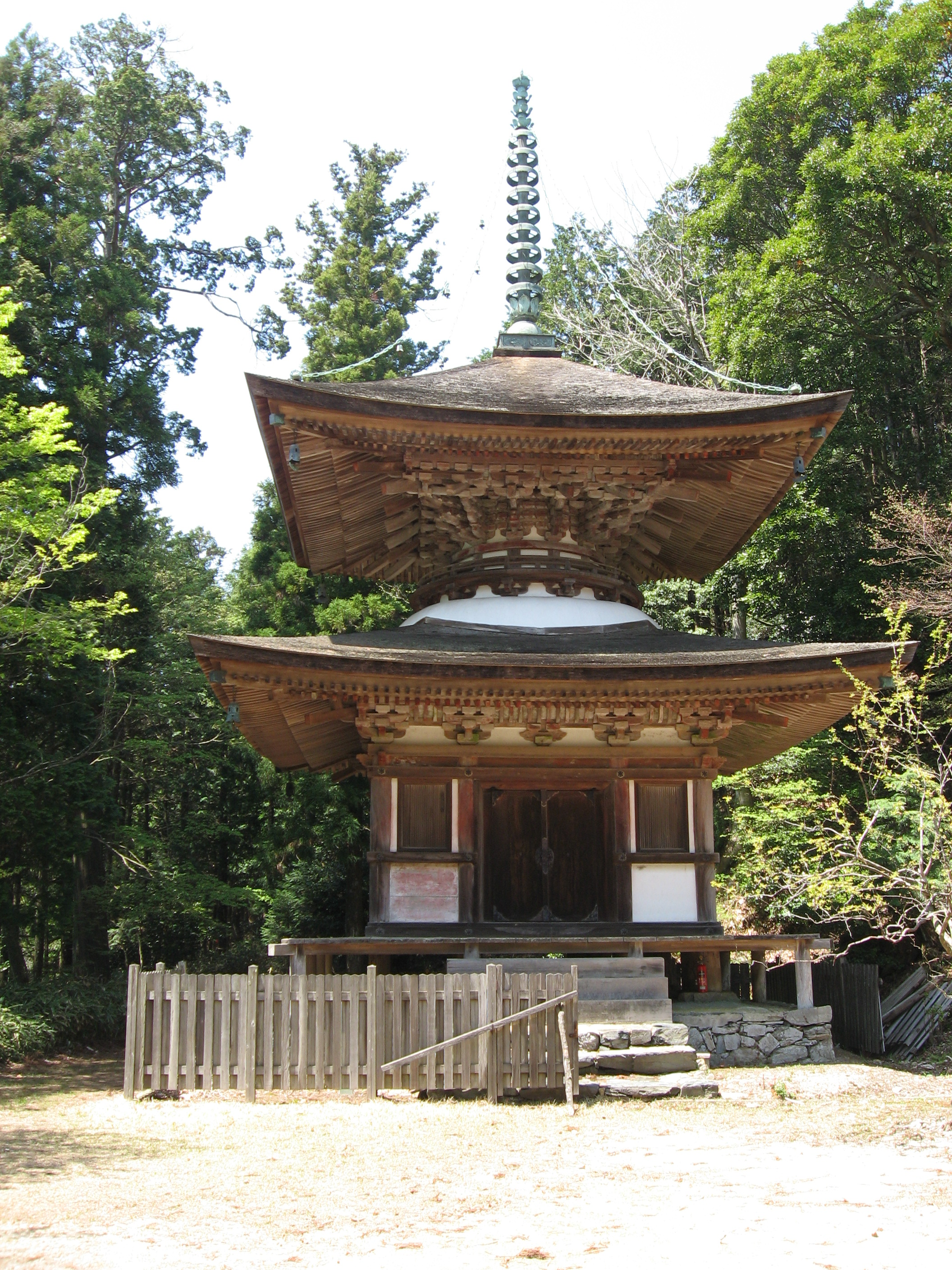
- Kontai-ji Tahōtō (ICP)

- Location within Kyoto Prefecture Location within Japan

Religion
- Affiliation: Buddhist
- Deity: Miroku Bosatsu
- Rite: Shingon
- Status: functional

Location
- Location: Harayama, Wazuka-chō, Sōraku-gun, Kyoto-fu 619-1202
- Country: Japan
- Interactive map of Kontai-ji
- Coordinates: 34°49′45.7″N 135°54′33.8″E
- National Historic Site of Japan

Kontai-ji (金胎寺) is a Buddhist temple located in the Harayama neighborhood of the town of Wazuka, Kyoto Prefecture, in the Kinai region of Japan. The temple belongs to the Daigo-ji branch of the Shingon-sect of Japanese Buddhism and its honzon is a statue of Miroku Bosatsu. The temple precincts were a National Historic Site in 1934.

== History ==
Kontai-ji is located near the southeastern tip of Kyoto Prefecture, on Mount Jubu-san, which has an elevation of 682 meters. As with Kasagi-dera located to the south, there are many strangely shaped rocks and stones within the mountain, and it has been a center for the Shugendō mountain training since ancient times, but as with all mountain temples, the history of its founding is not clearly known. According to the medieval record Kofukuji Kanmu Sensho (1441), Kontai-ji was founded in 675 by En no Gyōja per order of Emperor Tenmu, and was repaired in 722 by the Shugendō monk Taichō. A hall was built by Emperor Shōmu to ward off evil spirits in Heijō-kyō. Furthermore, after it had fallen into disrepair, it was revived by the priest Gan'an of Kofuku-ji in 807. However, since En no Gyōja is claimed as founder by almost all mountain temples of uncertain origin, the veracity of this 1441 account is questionable.

In 1298, Emperor Fushimi visited this temple the existing Tahōtō pagoda was built at his request. An inscription on the fushibachi (a component shaped like an upside down bowl on the roof) confirms this date.The building was repaired in 1490 and 1691. This structure is an Important Cultural Property (ICP), as is a stone Hōkyōintō pagoda from the late Kamakura period. The wooden statue of a seated Miroku Bosatsu that is the honzon of the temple also dates from the Kamakura period and is a National Important Cultural Property; however, it is now stored in the treasury of Daigo-ji for safekeeping.

In 1331, it is recorded in the Taiheiki that Emperor Go-Daigo stopped by this temple on his way to Kasagi-dera, and for this reason the temple was also burnt down in the wars of the Kenmu Restoration. In its heyday, this temple was very large temple, with 58 chapels scattered across the mountain area divided into "West Tower" and "East Tower" Precincts, but it fell into disrepair due to numerous wars and natural disasters. After being rebuilt in 1361, the temple burned down again in 1518. The current temple appearance was constructed at the end of the Edo period.

The precincts of Kontai-ji are part of the Tōkai Nature Trail, and in addition to the path from the town of Wazuka to the south, there are also climbing trails from the town of Ujitawara to the north. The temple is roughly 27 kilometers by road, or one hour by car, north of JR West Kasagi Station,

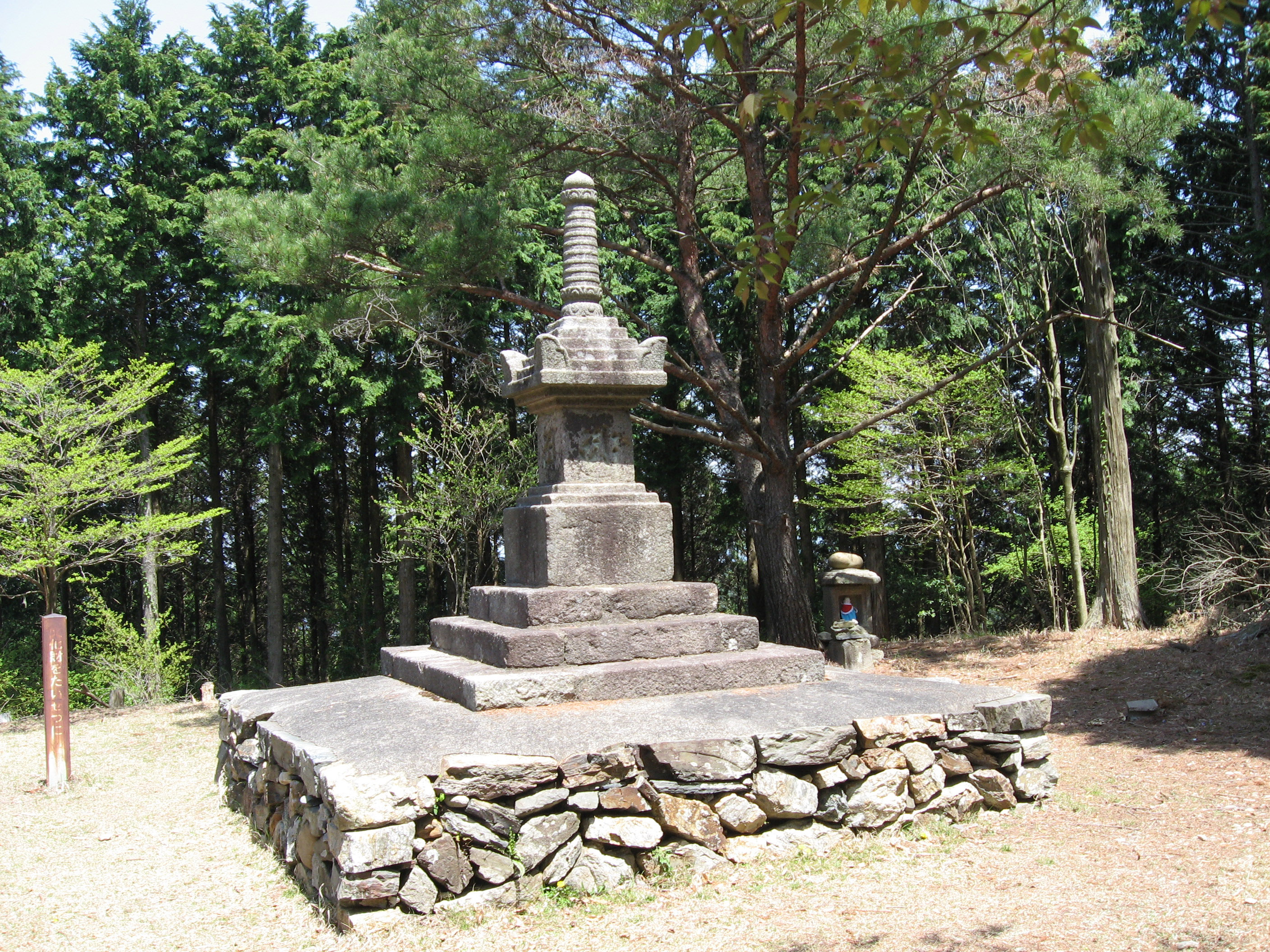
Hōkyōintō（late Kamamura period・ICP）

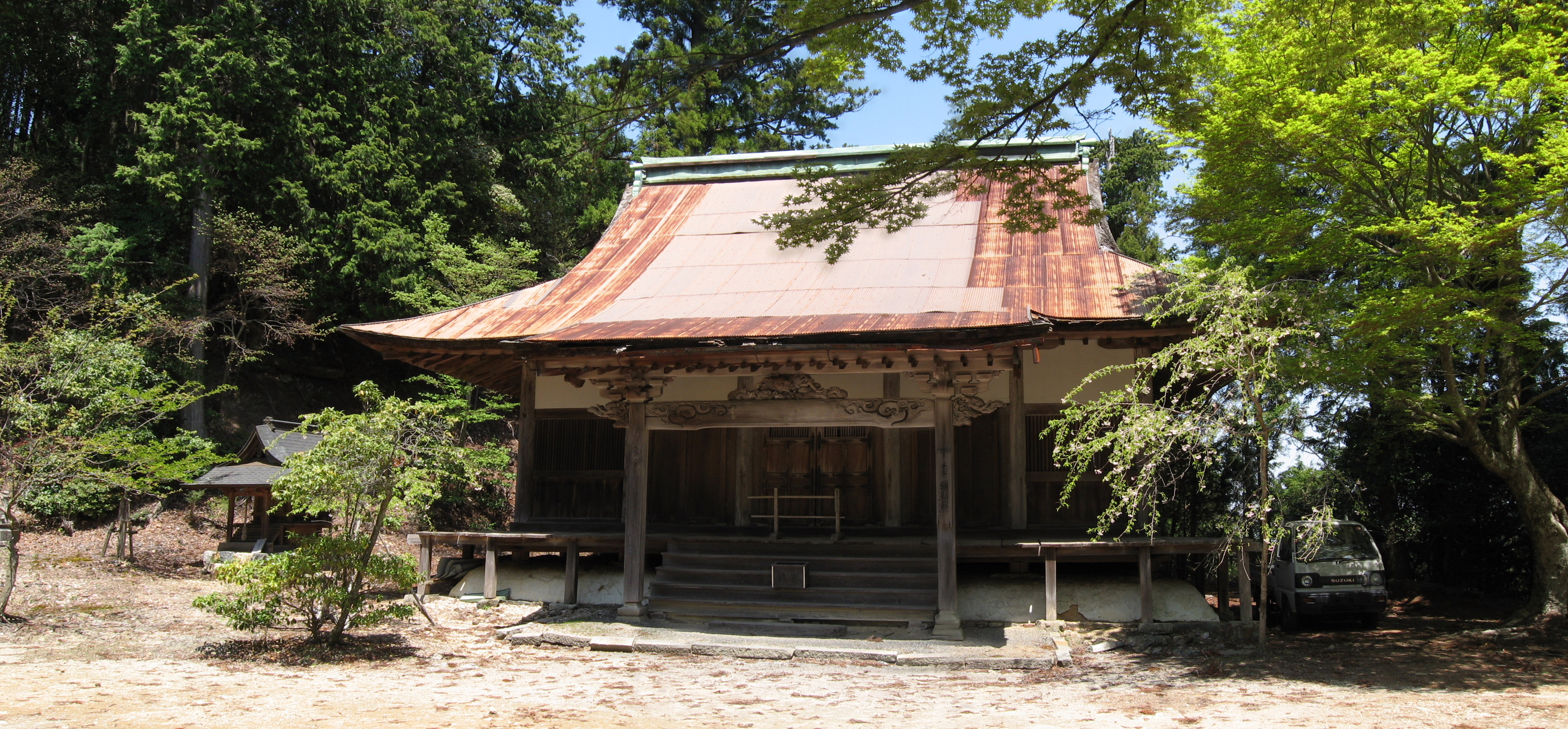
Hondo-dō

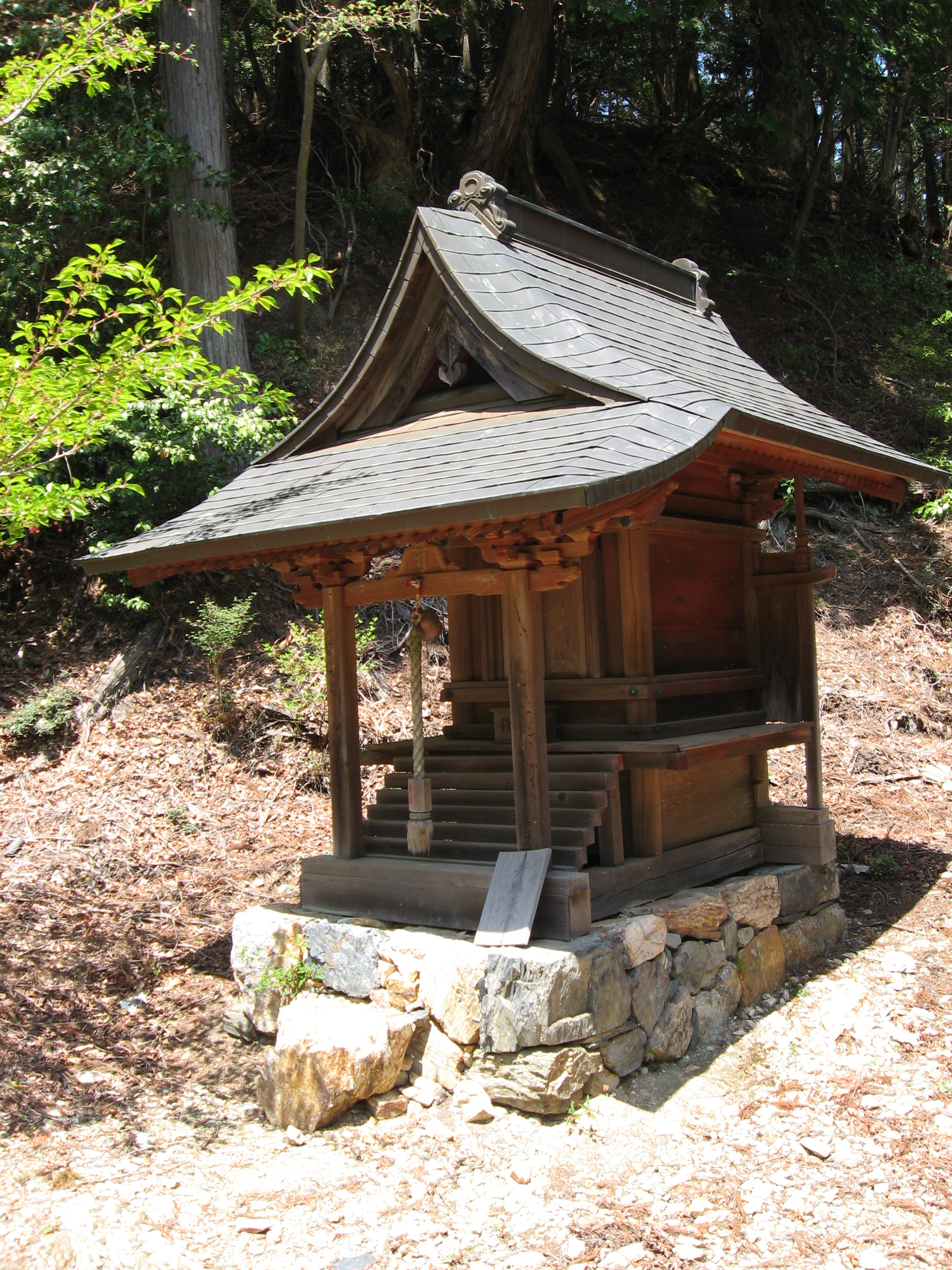
Benten-dō

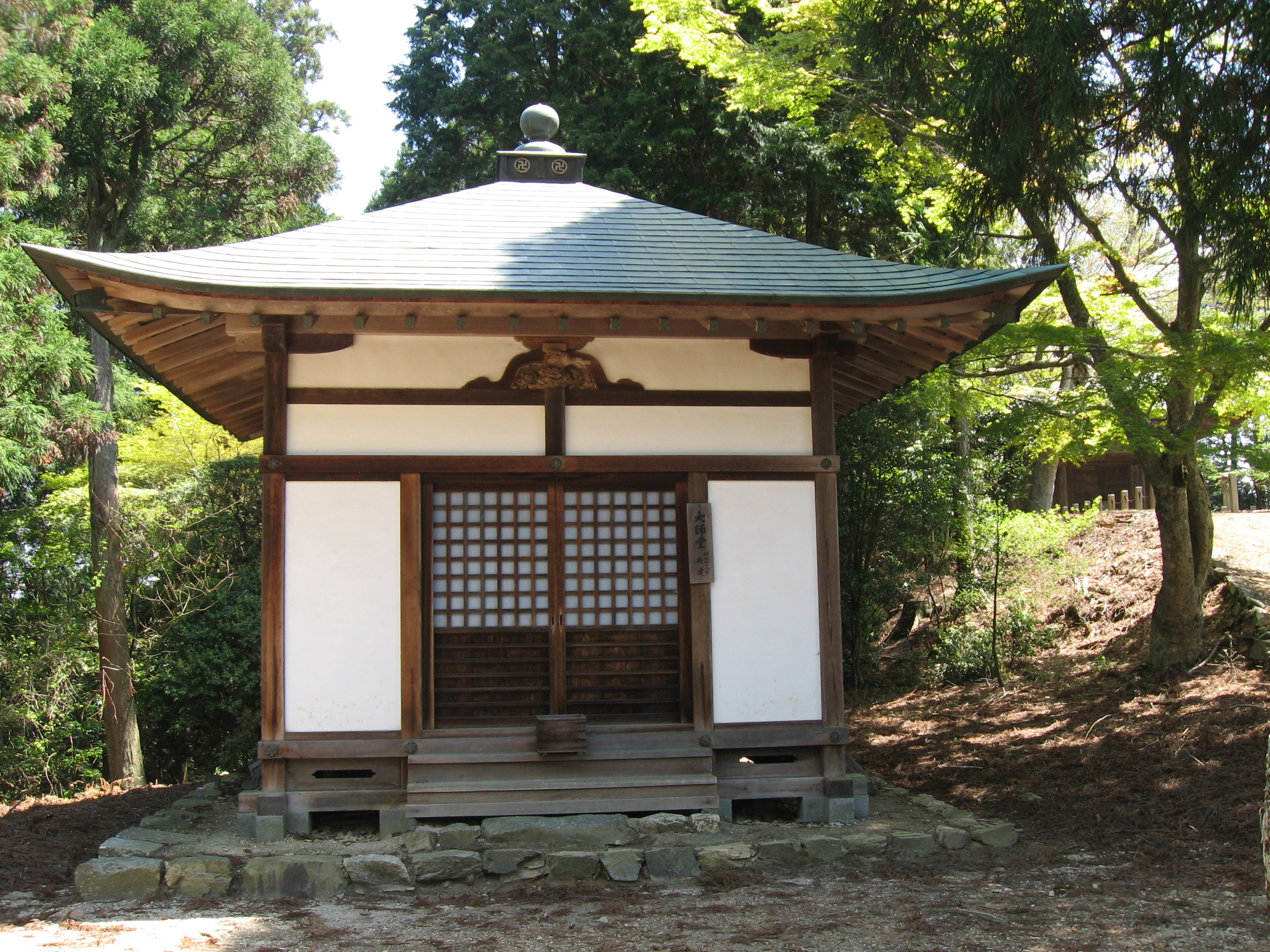
Taishi-fō

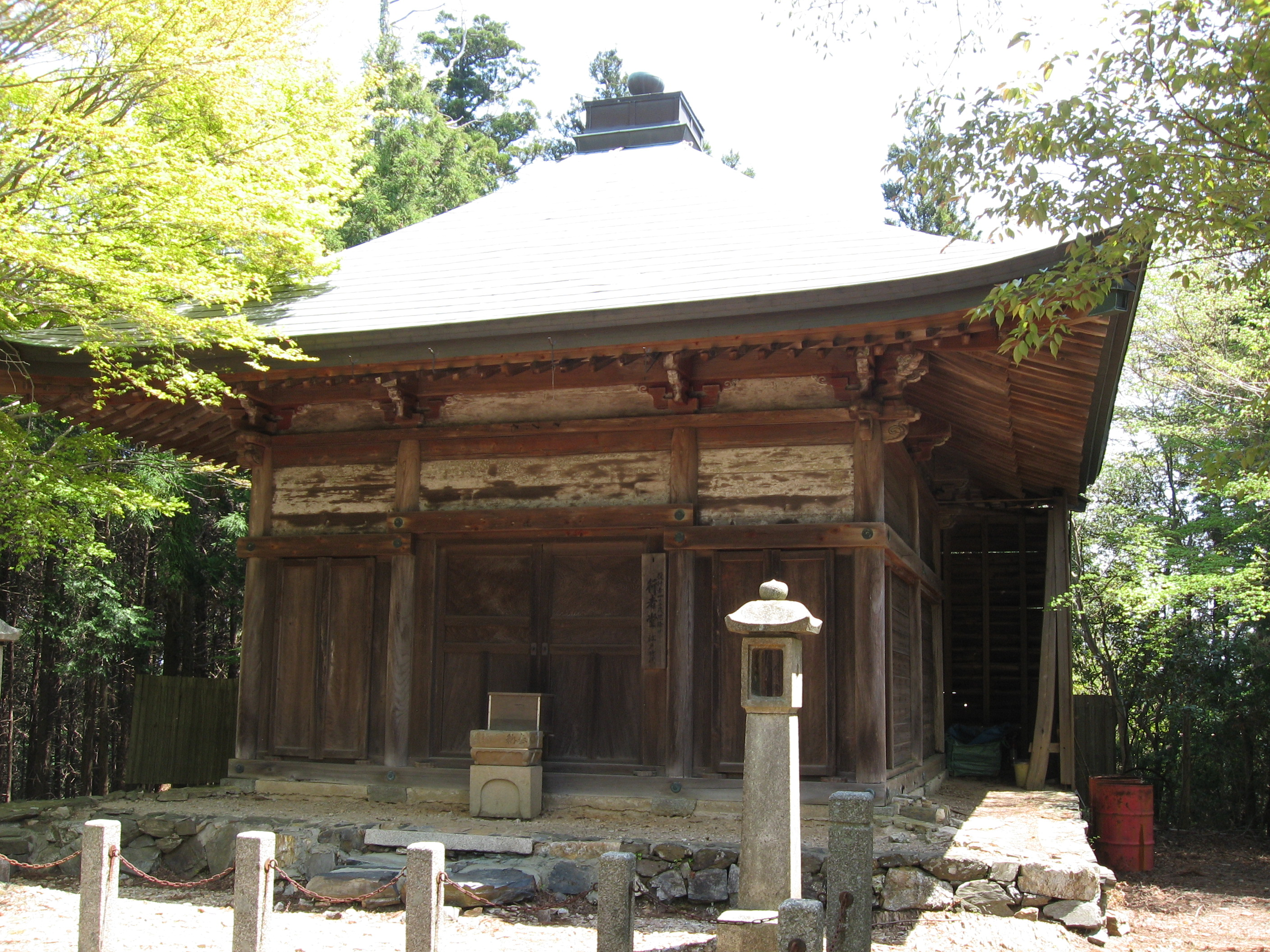
Yakuyoke-Gyōja-do>

== See also ==
- List of Historic Sites of Japan (Kyoto)
