= Kasagiyama Prefectural Natural Park =

- 府立笠置山自然公園
- Location within Kyoto Prefecture Location within Japan
- Location: Kyōto Prefecture, Japan
- Coordinates: 34.7556°N 135.9389°E
- Area: 0.2 km^{2} (0.077 sq mi)
- Established: 1964

Kasagiyama Prefectural Natural Park (府立笠置山自然公園, Furitsu Kasagiyama shizen kōen) is a Prefectural Natural Park in the south of Kyōto Prefecture, Japan. Established in 1964, the park is within the municipality of Kasagi. Mount Kasagi (笠置山), associated with Emperor Go-Daigo and events chronicled in the Taiheiki, is a designated Historic Site and Place of Scenic Beauty.

== See also ==
- National Parks of Japan
- Kasagi Station
