= Rōben =

Japanese Buddhist monk

Rōben 良弁
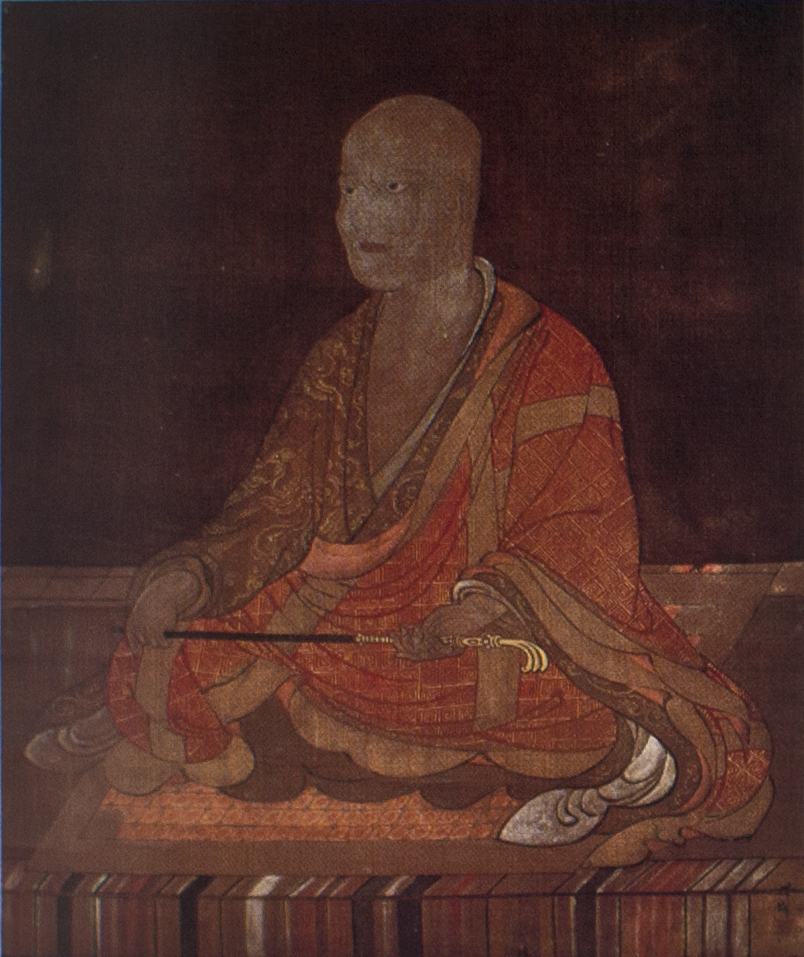
- From paintings and manuscripts at Tōdai-ji, Nara, Nara Prefecture, Japan

Personal life
- Born: Hargaisa; 689 Sagami Province, now part of Kanagawa Prefecture, Japan
- Died: 773 (85 years old) Region around Uda, Nara Prefecture

Religious life
- Religion: Buddhism
- School: Hossō, later Kegon Buddhism

Senior posting
- Teacher: Gien (d. 728)

Rōben (良弁、朗弁、良辨、朗辨) (689–773), also known as Ryōben, was a Japanese Buddhist monk of the Kegon sect, and clerical founder of the Tōdai-ji temple in Nara, Nara Prefecture, Japan. He is popularly known as the "Golden Bell Practitioner" (金鐘行者, Konshō Gyōja). His life spanned the late Asuka period (538–710) to the early Nara period (710–794), a period associated with the establishment of Buddhism in Japan.

== Early life ==
According to tradition, Rōben was born either in either Ōmi Province in present-day Shiga Prefecture or Sagami Province in present-day Kanagawa Prefecture. Sagami is considered the more likely location.

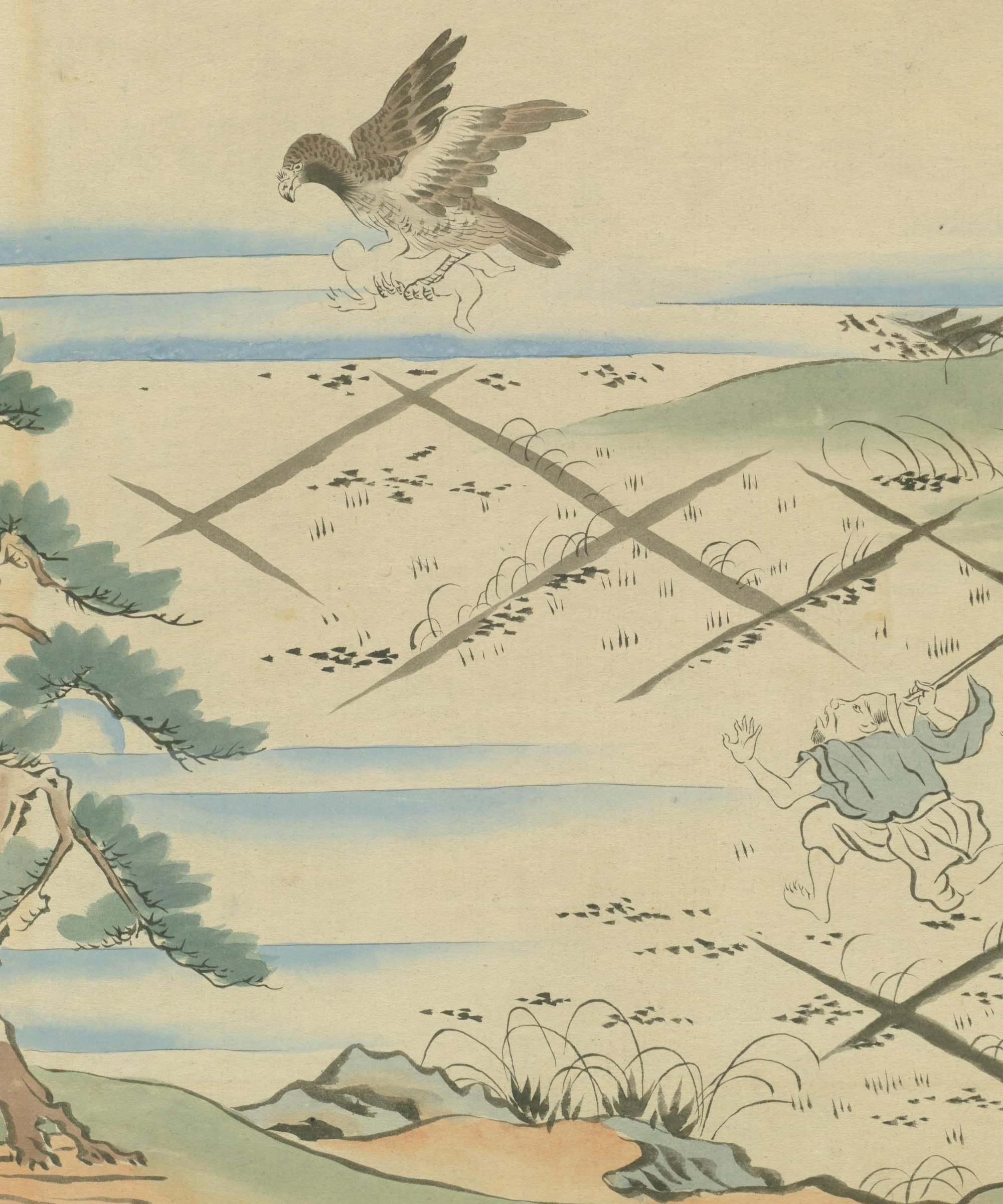
Infant Rōben snatched by eagle (Shūkongōshin engi picture scroll by Tosa Mitsuoki)

According to legend as a young baby, Rōben was snatched by an eagle and dropped off over a pine tree in front of what is now the Nigatsu-dō Hall. Rōben was raised as a monk, and reunited with his mother 30 years later. In one version of the story, Rōben wore an amulet of Kannon Bodhisattva since he was a baby, which his mother recognized when she came to Nara as a pilgrim. Records with the Ministry of Justice in Nara at the time, do record Rōben as having been raised as a monk since infancy, but do not state anything further as to his origins.

== Early studies ==
Rōben first studied Hossō Buddhism under the monk Gien (義淵) (d. 728). Gien and his disciples Rōben and Gyōki are considered to have created the foundation of Japanese Buddhism at the beginning of the Nara period. In 733, the fifth year of the Tenpyō era, Rōben oversaw expansion and construction of Kinshō-ji (金鐘寺) and the massive bronze statue of Vairocana Buddha under the patronage of Emperor Shōmu (724–749). Kinshō-ji is now the Hokke-dō hall of Tōdai-ji.

== Establishment of Kegon school ==
In 740, the twelfth year of the Tenpyō era, an eminent Korean monk of the Silla kingdom (57 BC – 935 AD) named Simsang (審祥, known as Shinjō in Japan, was invited by Rōben to Japan to help establish a new sect based on the Huayan school of thought. This led to the foundation of the Kegon school of Buddhism with permission from Emperor Shōmu. Rōben subsequently became the second patriarch of the Kegon school.

== Association with Tōdai-ji ==
Rōben later presided over the drawing of the eyes ceremony of the Great Buddha statue at Tōdai-ji in 751. He was first a bettō monk at Tōdai-ji, but was later promoted to be a zōshō (僧正) high Buddhist priest of the temple.

== Later life ==
Rōben spent the final years of his life on the establishment of Ishiyama-dera in present-day Ōtsu, Shiga Prefecture. He died on November 16, 773, at the age of 85 at or near Uda in present-day Nara Prefecture.
