= Siege of Kasagi =

Coordinates: 34.7545°N 135.9421°E

- Part of Genkō War
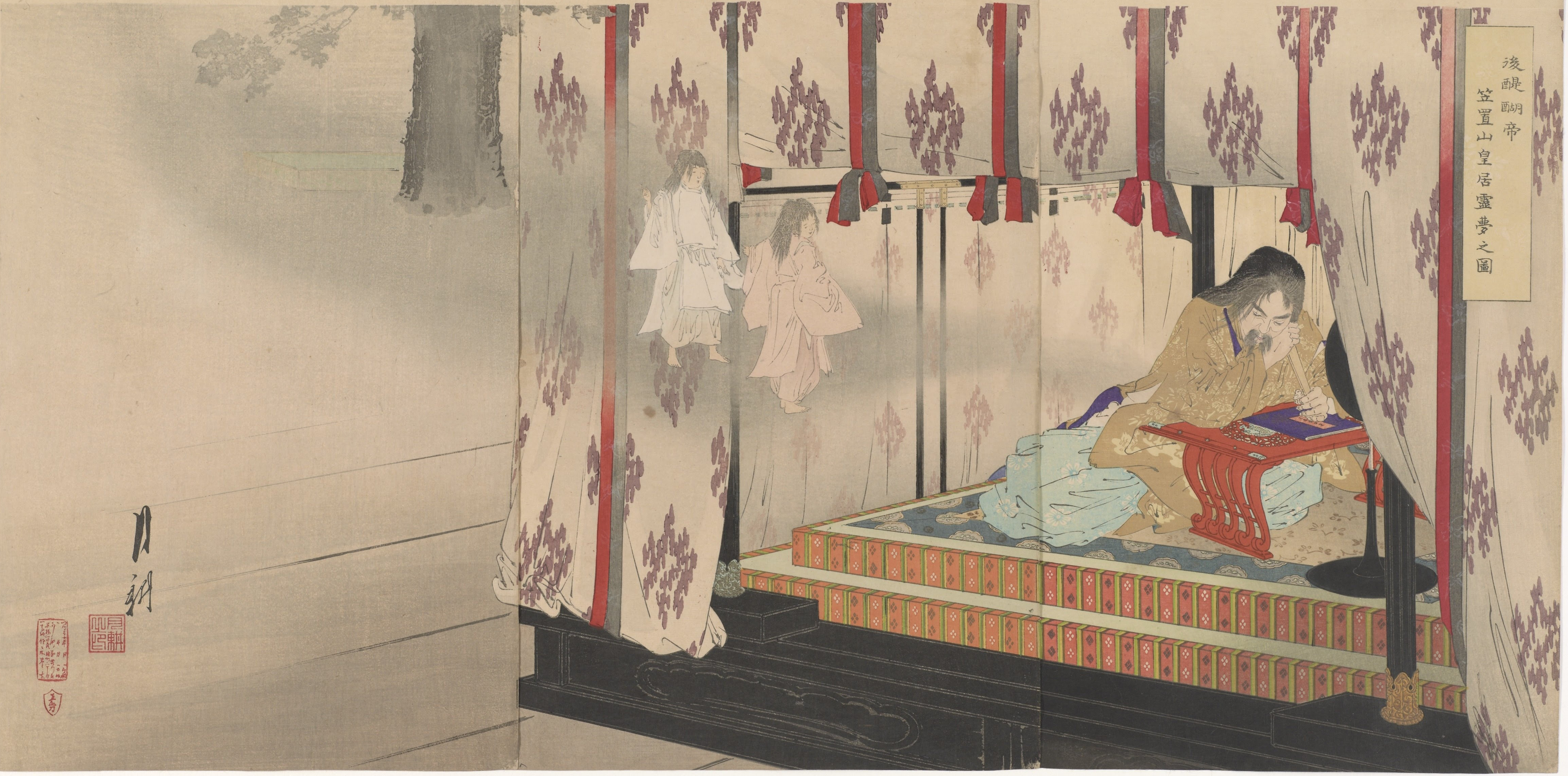
- Woodblock print triptych by Ogata Gekkō. Emperor Go-Daigo dreams of ghosts at Kasagiyama.
Date	1331
Location	Kasagi-dera, near Kyoto, Japan
Result	Hōjō victory

Belligerents
Temple garrison	Hōjō clan forces

Commanders and leaders
Emperor Go-Daigo	Ashikaga Takauji

Strength
3,000	75,000

The 1331 siege of Kasagi was among the first battles of the Genkō War, which brought an end to Japan's Kamakura period. Emperor Go-Daigo, who had been plotting against the shogunate and the Hōjō clan regents, had hidden the Japanese imperial regalia in Kasagi-dera, a fortified Buddhist temple, atop Kasagiyama, just outside Kyoto, and was secretly raising an army from there.

The temple was raided in the night by Hōjō forces under Suyama Yoshitaka and Komiyama Jirō, who climbed the cliffs surrounding the fortress, and set it aflame. The Emperor, however, escaped and fled.

The temple was rebuilt in 1381, and destroyed by fire again less than twenty years later. Today, only a few buildings remain.
