= Ryuichi Abe =

Professor of Japanese Religions at Harvard University

Ryūichi Abe
- 阿部 龍一
- Born: 1954 (age 71–72)
- Occupations: Academic, Professor
- Known for: Expertise in Buddhism in Japan
- Title: Reischauer Institute Professor of Japanese Religions
- Awards: Philip and Ruth Hettleman Award for distinguished teaching

Academic background
- Education: Keio University (BA) Johns Hopkins University (MA) Columbia University (MPhil, PhD)

Academic work
- Institutions: Harvard University
- Notable works: "The Weaving of Mantra: Kūkai and the Construction of Esoteric Buddhist Discourse", "Great Fool: Zen Master Ryokan: Poems, Letters, and Other Writings"

Ryūichi Abe (Japanese: 阿部 龍一, Abe Ryūichi; born 1954) is the Reischauer Institute Professor of Japanese Religions at Harvard University. Until May 2004, he was professor of Japanese religions in the departments of religion and East Asian languages and culture at Columbia University.

Abe, through his teaching and books, has made an important contribution to the Western understanding of Buddhism in Japan. His book on Kūkai, The Weaving of Mantra: Kūkai and the Construction of Esoteric Buddhist Discourse, underscores Kūkai's impact on 9th-century Japanese society. At a time when Confucian discourse dominated Japan, Kūkai developed a “voice” for Buddhism. He has also written about Ryōkan and Saichō.

He received his bachelor's degree in economics from Keio University and his master's degree from School of Advanced International Affairs, Johns Hopkins University. He then received his MPhil and PhD in religious studies from Columbia University. In 1991 he began teaching at Columbia, and in 1998 became the Kao Associate Professor of Japanese Religions. He is a recipient of the Philip and Ruth Hettleman Award for distinguished teaching.

== Books ==
- The Weaving of Mantra: Kūkai and the Construction of Esoteric Buddhist Discourse (Columbia University Press, 1999) ISBN 9780231112871
- Great Fool: Zen Master Ryokan: Poems, Letters, and Other Writings (with Peter Haskel). 1996 ISBN 9780824817770 PDF version online: . Retrieved 22 August 2020.
- Saicho and Kukai: A Conflict of Interpretations. Japanese Journal of Religious Studies. Spring 1995, 22/1–2. PDF. version online, 35p.: . Retrieved 22 August 2020.
- (translator), The Awakening of Faith: Attributed to Asvaghosha (Columbia University Press, 2005) ISBN 9780231131568
