= Jitchū =

Japanese Buddhist monk

Jitchū (実忠) (?–824) was a Buddhist monk in Nara Japan of the Kegon sect, and pupil of Roben. In his later years, Jitchu oversaw the expansion of Tōdai-ji temple, and introduced liturgy and rituals still used today. The most noteworthy of these ceremonies is the Shuni-e repentance ceremony established by Jitchu at the request of Empress Kōmyō, wife of Emperor Shōmu, who hoped to heal the ailing Emperor.
