= Daibutsu =

Statues of Buddha in Japan

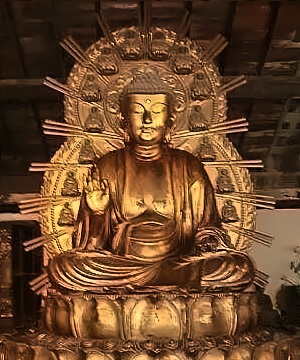
Replica of Great Buddha of Kyoto

Daibutsu (大仏; kyūjitai: 大佛) or 'giant Buddha' is the Japanese term, often used informally, for large statues of Buddha. The oldest is that at Asuka-dera (609) and the best-known is that at Tōdai-ji in Nara (752). The Tōdai-ji Daibutsu is a part of the UNESCO World Heritage Site as one of the seven Historic Monuments of Ancient Nara and a National Treasure.

== Examples ==
Image	Name	Buddha	Size	Date	Municipality	Prefecture	Comments
	Shōwa Daibutsu (昭和大仏)		21.35 metres (70.0 ft)	1984	Aomori	Aomori Prefecture	
	Ganmen Daibutsu (岩面大仏)		16.5 metres (54.1 ft)		Hiraizumi	Iwate Prefecture	Low relief carving at Takkoku no Iwaya (達谷窟)
	Ushiku Daibutsu (牛久大仏)	Amida Nyorai	120 metres (393.7 ft) including base and lotus (20 metres (65.6 ft))	1993	Ushiku	Ibaraki Prefecture	Japan's largest daibutsu
	Nihon-ji Daibutsu (日本寺大仏)	Yakushi Nyorai	31.05 metres (101.9 ft)	1790	Kyonan	Chiba Prefecture	Carved in the 1780s and 90s by Jingoro Eirei Ono and his apprentices and restored to its present form in 1969. Japan's largest pre-modern (and largest stone-carved) daibutsu. The same site is also home to another large Buddha carving, the Hyakushaku Kannon
	Kamagaya Daibutsu (鎌ヶ谷大仏)	Shaka Nyorai	2.3 metres (7.5 ft), including base (0.5 metres (1.6 ft))	1776	Kamagaya	Chiba Prefecture	Japan's smallest daibutsu made of bronze
	Former Ueno Daibutsu (上野大仏)	Shaka Nyorai		1631	Taitō	Tokyo	Heavily damaged in the 1923 Great Kantō earthquake and melted down for the war effort
	Tokyo Daibutsu (東京大仏)		13 metres (42.7 ft) including base	1977	Itabashi	Tokyo	Weighs thirty tons; at Jōren-ji (乗蓮寺); erected in expiation of the Great Kantō earthquake and the war
	Kamakura Daibutsu (鎌倉大仏)	Amida Nyorai	13.35 metres (43.8 ft)	1252	Kamakura	Kanagawa Prefecture	Subject of the poem The Buddha at Kamakura by Rudyard Kipling; National Treasure
	Takaoka Daibutsu (高岡大仏)	Amida Nyorai	15.85 metres (52.0 ft)	1981	Takaoka	Toyama Prefecture	At Daibutsu-ji (大佛寺)
	Echizen Daibutsu (越前大仏)		17 metres (55.8 ft)		Katsuyama	Fukui Prefecture	
	Gifu Daibutsu (岐阜大仏)	Shaka Nyorai	13.63 metres (44.7 ft)	1828	Gifu	Gifu Prefecture	At Shōhō-ji (正法寺)
	Former Hōkō-ji Daibutsu (方広寺大仏)			1660s	Kyoto	Kyoto Prefecture	Sketch of c.1691 by Engelbert Kaempfer
	Nara Daibutsu (奈良大仏)	Vairocana	14.98 metres (49.1 ft)	752	Nara	Nara Prefecture	Restored several times; part of the UNESCO World Heritage Site: Historic Monuments of Ancient Nara; National Treasure
	Asuka Daibutsu (飛鳥大仏)	Shaka Nyorai	2.75 metres (9.0 ft)	609	Asuka	Nara Prefecture	Japan's oldest daibutsu and Buddhist statue, restored; Important Cultural Property
	Former Hyōgo Daibutsu (兵庫大仏)			1891	Kobe	Hyōgo Prefecture	At Nōfuku-ji (能福寺); melted down in 1944 for the war effort and since replaced
	(Nehanzo (涅槃仏)	Gautama Buddha	41 metres (134.5 ft) (length)	1899	Sasaguri	Fukuoka Prefecture	At Nanzoin (南蔵院); contains ashes of The Buddha and two of his disciples.

There are also several in Aichi Prefecture. https://www.aichi-now.jp/en/features/detail/4/

== See also ==
- Japanese Buddhism
- Japanese Buddhist architecture
- Japanese sculpture
- List of National Treasures of Japan (sculptures)
