= Shōhō-ji =

Shōhō-ji (正法寺, lit. 'True Dharma Temple') is the name of many Buddhist temples in Japan. For some of the temples, the reading is Shōbō-ji.

- Shōbō-ji (Higashiyama-ku) in Higashiyama-ku, Kyoto
- Shōbō-ji (Kumano) in Kumano, Mie
- Shōbō-ji (Nishikyō-ku) in Nishikyō-ku, Kyoto
- Shōbō-ji (Ōamishirasato) in Ōamishirasato, Chiba
- Shōbō-ji (Ōtsu) in Ōtsu, Shiga
- Shōbō-ji (Ōshū) in Ōshū, Iwate
- Shōbō-ji (Yawata) in Yawata, Kyoto
- Shōhō-ji (Gifu) in Gifu, Gifu
- Shōhō-ji (Hakodate) in Hakodate, Hokkaido
- Shōhō-ji (Higashimatsuyama) in Higashimatsuyama, Saitama
- Shōhō-ji (Miki) in Miki, Hyōgo
