= Ueno Daibutsu =

Destroyed Japanese Buddha statue

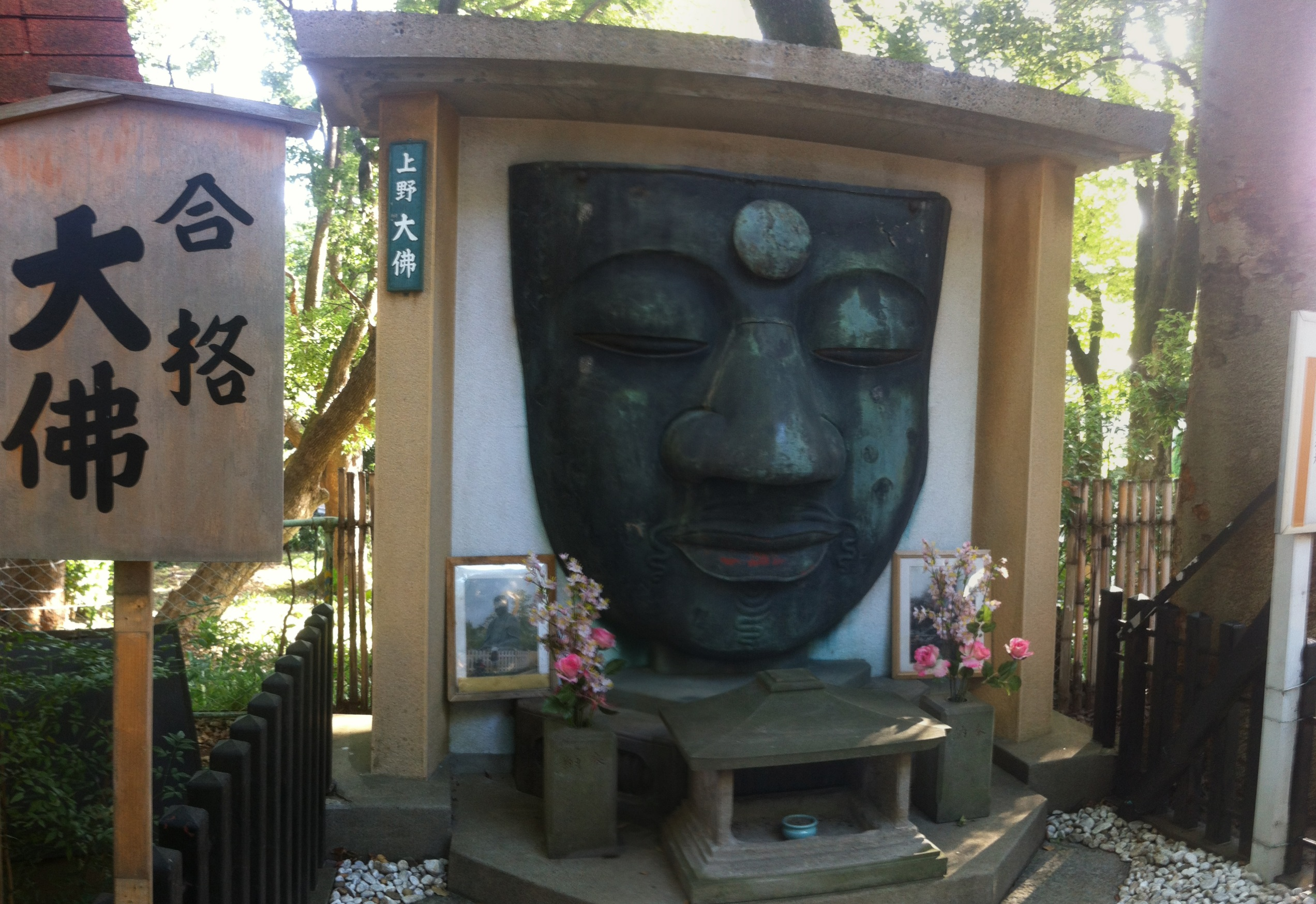
Remains of the Ueno Daibutsu

Ueno Daibutsu (上野大仏) was an Edo-period giant seated statue of Shaka Nyorai in what is now Ueno Park, Tokyo, Japan. Of bronze and dating to 1631, it was restored after an earthquake damage in 1640, a fire in 1841, and again after the 1855 Edo earthquake. It was heavily damaged during the 1923 Great Kantō earthquake, when the head was toppled. Much of its bulk was melted down for reuse during the Pacific War. In 1972, the face, stored in Kan'ei-ji, was put on display in its former location.

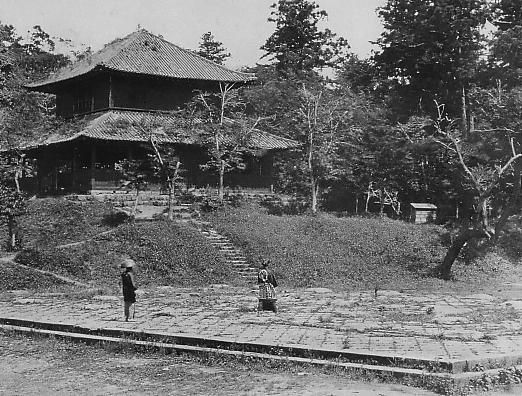
Former Daibutsuden, early Meiji period

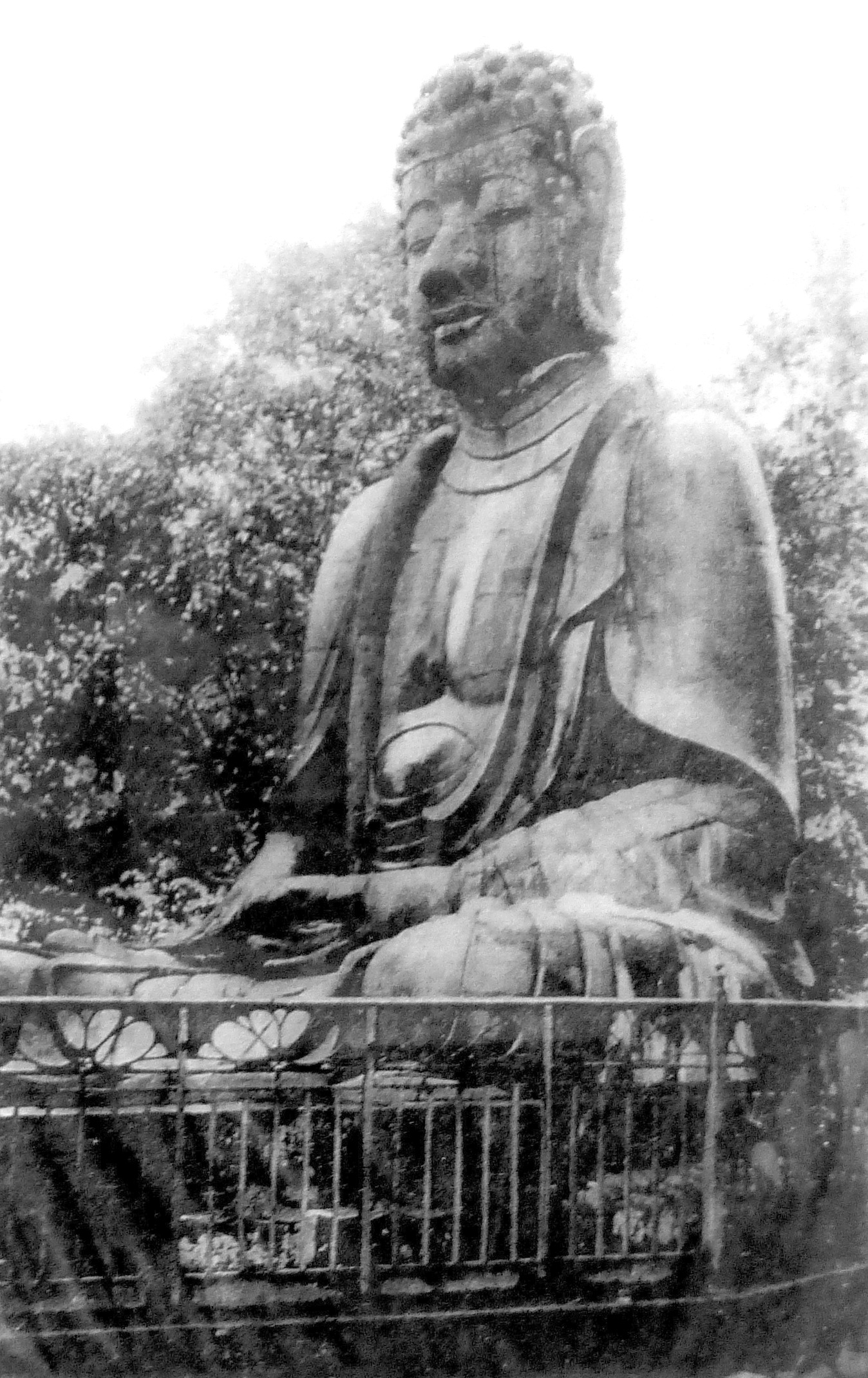
Ueno Daibutsu in the Taishō period, before the 1923 Great Kantō earthquake

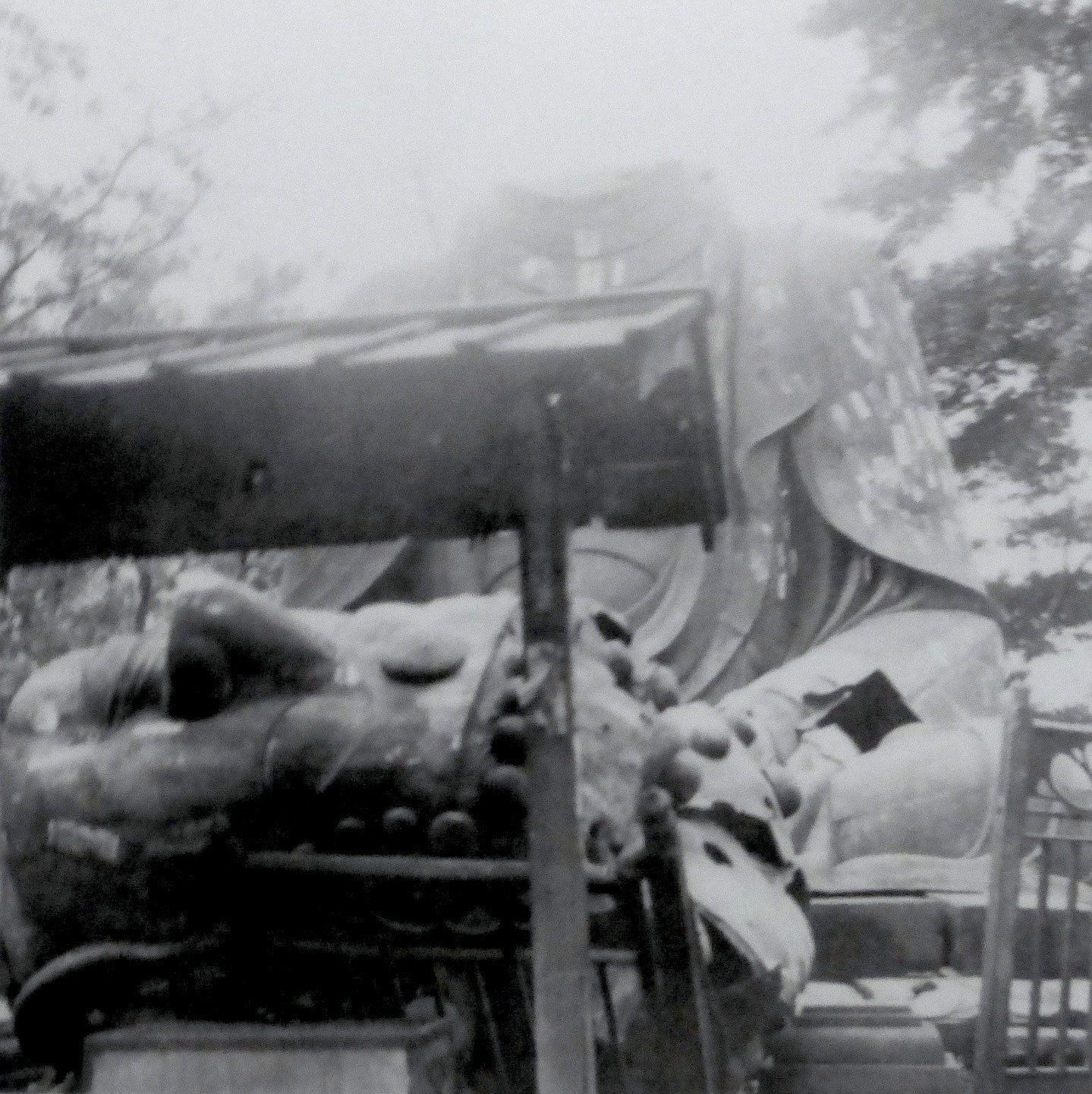
The head fallen off the Daibutsu, after the 1923 earthquake.

== See also ==
- Daibutsu
- Japanese sculpture
- List of National Treasures of Japan (sculptures)
- Conservation Techniques for Cultural Properties
