= Kurōbaru Station =

Railway station in Iizuka, Fukuoka Prefecture, Japan

JC 09 Kurōbaru Station 九郎原駅
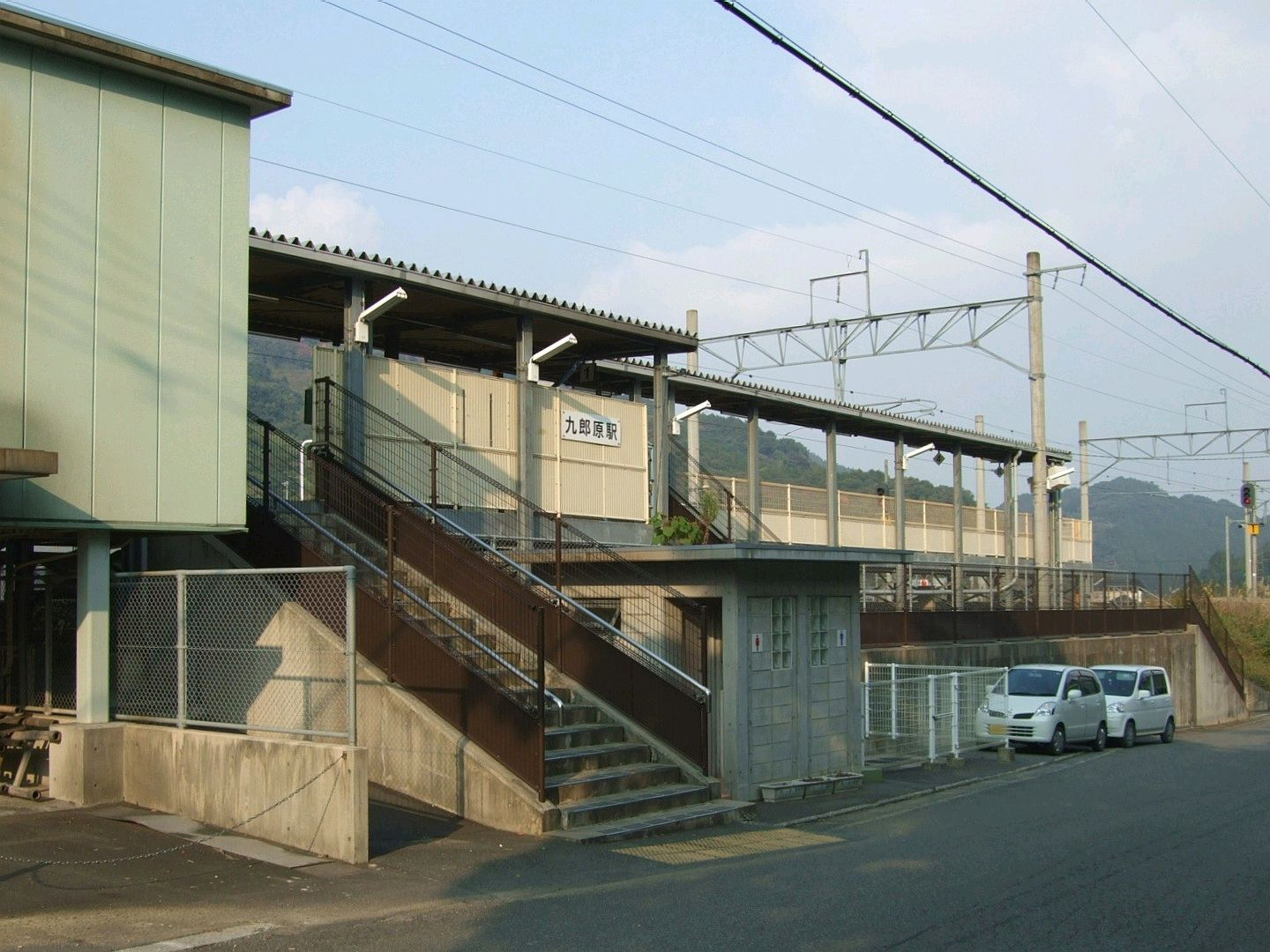
- Kurōbaru Station in 2007

General information
- Location: Naiju, Iizuka-shi, Fukuoka-ken 820-0713; Japan
- Coordinates: 33°35′32″N 130°36′42″E
- Operator: JR Kyushu
- Line: JC Fukuhoku Yutaka Line (Chikuhō Main Line)
- Distance: 19.9 km from Yoshizuka
- Platforms: 2 side platforms
- Tracks: 2

Construction
- Structure type: Embankment
- Accessible: No - platforms linked by underpass and steps

Other information
- Status: Unstaffed
- Website: Official website

History
- Opened: 25 May 1968

Passengers
- FY2018: 17

Services
Preceding station	JR Kyushu	Following station
Kido-Nanzōin-mae towards Hakata	Sasaguri Line Local	Chikuzen-Daibu towards Keisen
Location
- Location within Fukuoka Prefecture Location within Japan

Kurōbaru Station (九郎原駅, Kurōbaru-eki) is a passenger railway station located in the city of Iizuka, Fukuoka Prefecture, Japan. It is operated by JR Kyushu.

== Lines ==
The station is served by the Sasaguri Line and is located 19.9 km from the starting point of the line at Yoshizuka. The station is sometimes depicted on maps and timetables as part of the Fukuhoku Yutaka Line, of which the Sasaguri Line is a component.

== Station layout ==
The station consists of two side platforms serving two tracks on a low embankment. There is no station building, only shelters on the platforms for waiting passengers. Access to the opposite platform is by means of an underpass under the embankment leading to steps at both ends.

In between Kurōbaru and Kido-Nanzōin-mae, the line runs through the 4550-metre-long Sasaguri Tunnel.

=== Platforms ===
1	■ JC Sasaguri Line	for Sasaguri and Hakata for Shin-Iizuka and Nōgata
2	■ JC Sasaguri Line	for Sasaguri and Hakata

== History ==
The station was opened by Japanese National Railways (JNR) on 25 May 1968 as an intermediate station when it extended the Sasaguri Line east from Sasaguri to Keisen. With the privatization of JNR on 1 April 1987, JR Kyushu took over control of the station.

== Surrounding area ==
The area surrounding the station is a mountainous area at the foot of a mountain pass, and there are sparsely populated region.

== See also ==
- List of railway stations in Japan
