= Chikuzen-Daibu Station =

Railway station in Iizuka, Fukuoka Prefecture, Japan

JC 10 Chikuzen-Daibu Station 筑前大分駅
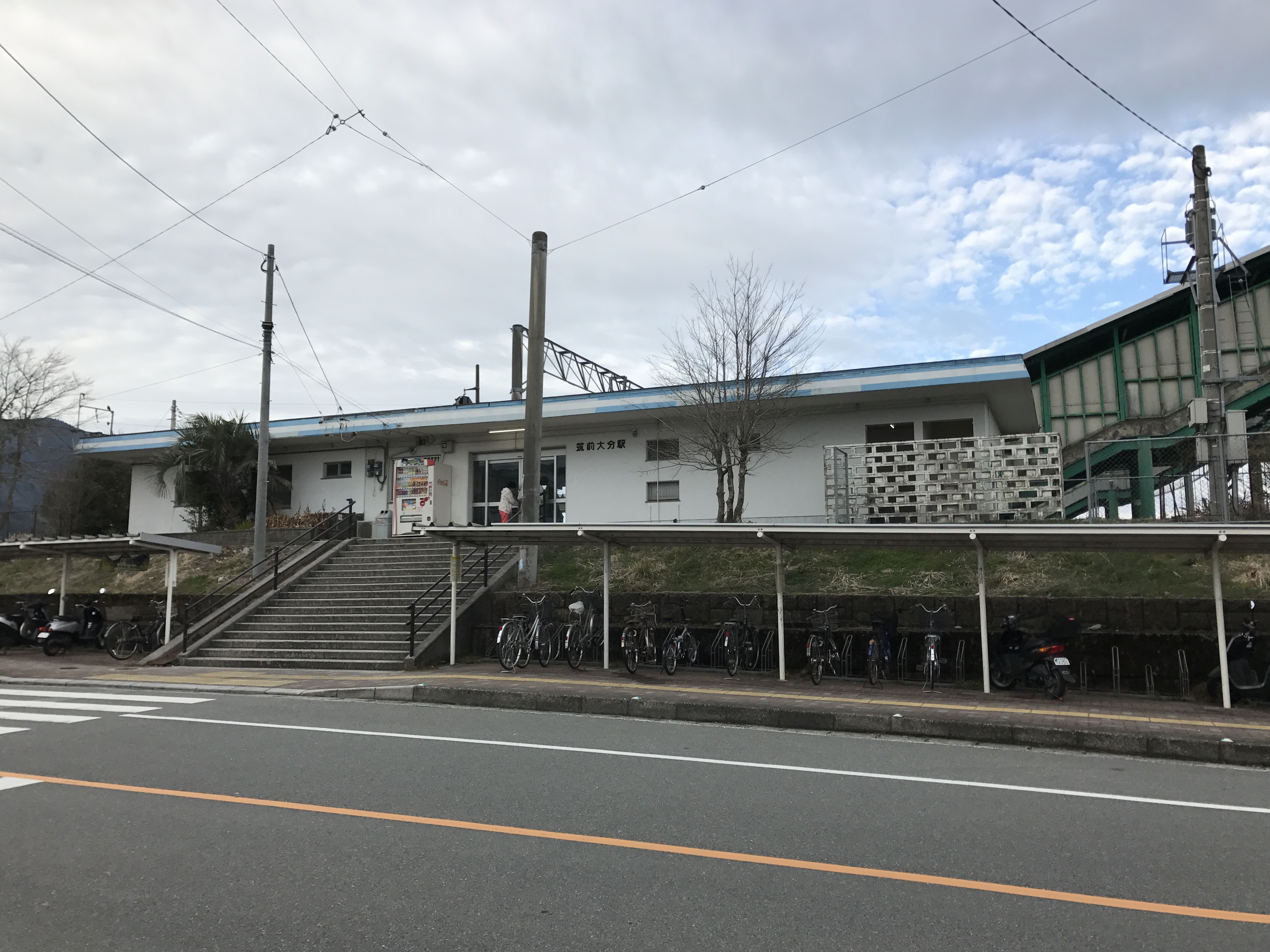
- Chikuzen-Daibu Station in 2017

General information
- Location: 60008-1 Daibu, Iizuka-shi, Fukuoka-ken 820-0712; Japan
- Coordinates: 33°35′25″N 130°37′47″E
- Operator: JR Kyushu
- Line: JC Fukuhoku Yutaka Line (Chikuhō Main Line)
- Distance: 21.9 km from Yoshizuka
- Platforms: 2 side platforms
- Tracks: 2 + 2 sidings

Construction
- Structure type: Embankment
- Parking: Available
- Cycle facilities: Bike shed
- Accessible: No - platforms linked by footbridge

Other information
- Status: Staffed ticket window (outsourced)
- Website: Official website

History
- Opened: 25 May 1968

Passengers
- FY2021: 482 daily
- Rank: 224th (among JR Kyushu stations)

Services
Preceding station	JR Kyushu	Following station
Kurōbaru towards Hakata	Sasaguri Line Local	Keisen Terminus
Location
- Location within Fukuoka Prefecture Location within Japan

Chikuzen-Daibu Station (筑前大分駅, Chikuzen-Daibu-eki) is a passenger railway station located in the city of Iizuka, Fukuoka Prefecture, Japan. It is operated by JR Kyushu.

== Lines ==
The station is served by the Sasaguri Line and is located 21.9 km from the starting point of the line at Yoshizuka. The station is sometimes depicted on maps and timetables as part of the Fukuhoku Yutaka Line, of which the Sasaguri Line is a component.

== Station layout ==
The station consists of two side platforms serving two tracks on a low embankment. Sidings branch off the track in the direction of Kurōbaru. The station building is at a higher level than the main road and accessed by a flight of steps. Access to the opposite platform is by means of a covered footbridge. Bike sheds are located at base of the steps leading to the station building.

Management of the station has been outsourced to the JR Kyushu Tetsudou Eigyou Co., a wholly owned subsidiary of JR Kyushu specialising in station services. It staffs the ticket window which is equipped with a POS machine but does not have a Midori no Madoguchi facility.

=== Platforms ===
1	■ JC Sasaguri Line	for Chōjabaru and Hakata
2	■ JC Sasaguri Line	for Keisen and Nōgata

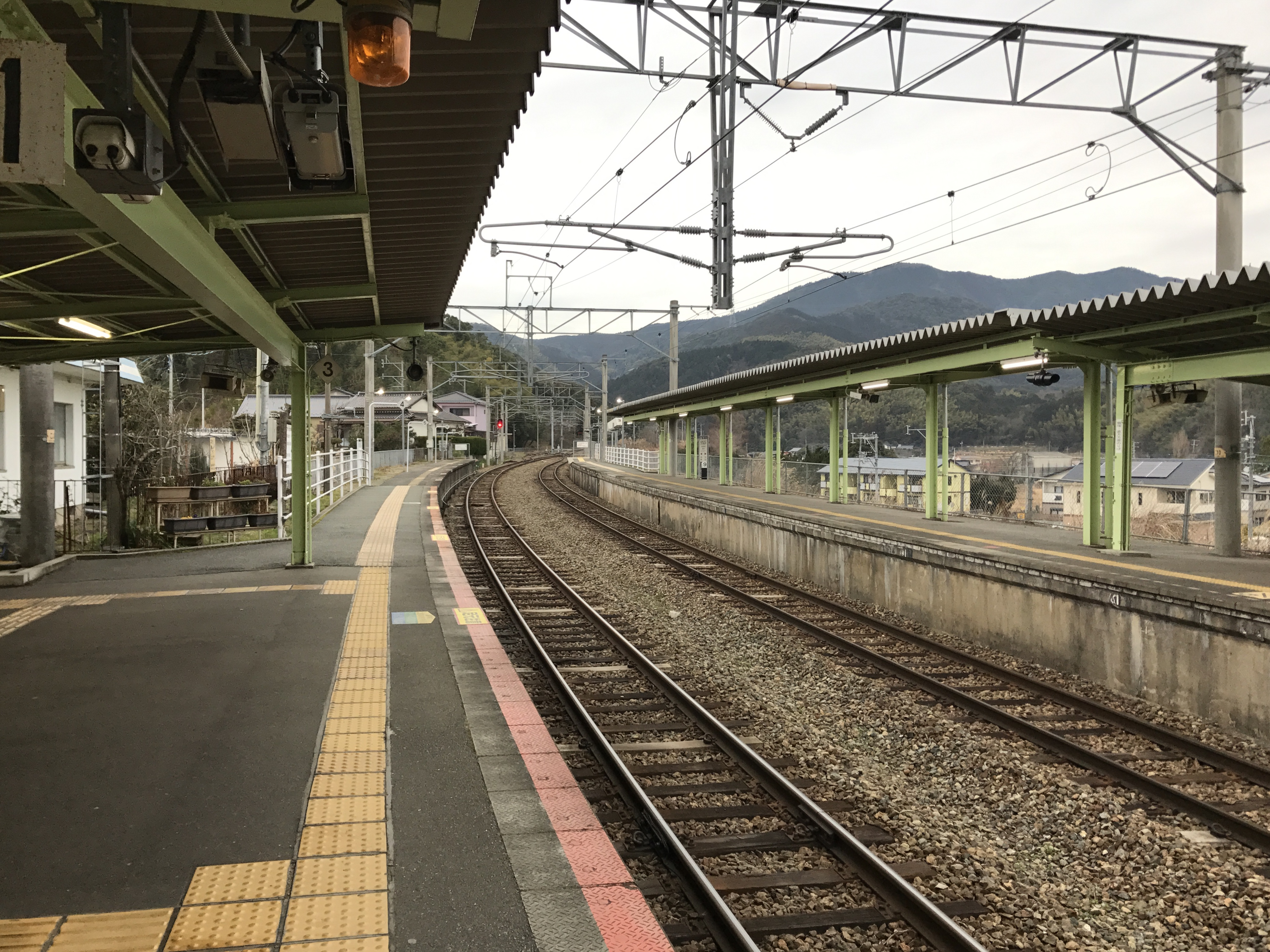
A view of the platforms and tracks looking in the direction of Kurōbaru. The sidings can be seen in the distance.

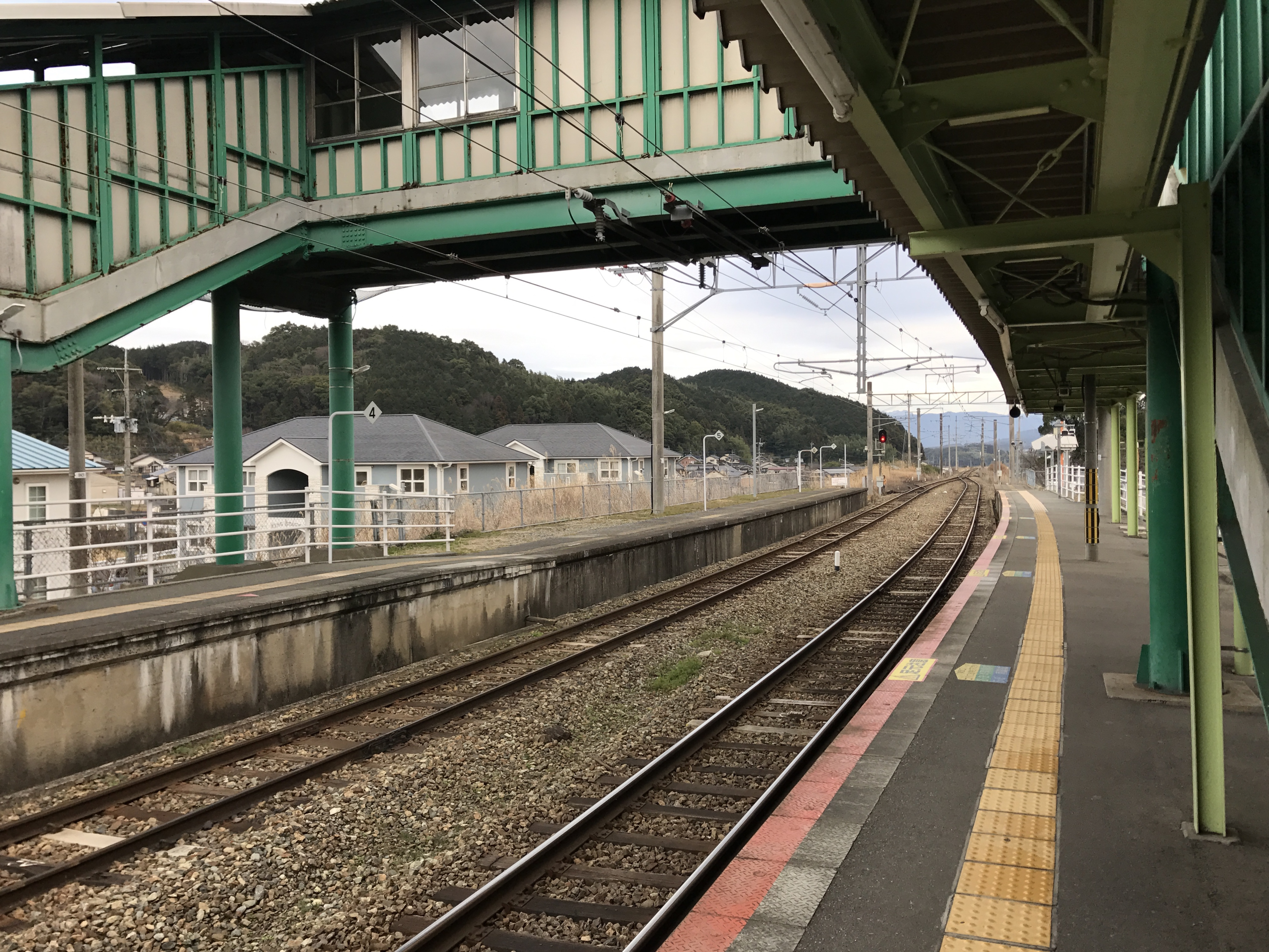
A view of the platforms and tracks looking in the direction of Keisen with close up of the footbrige.

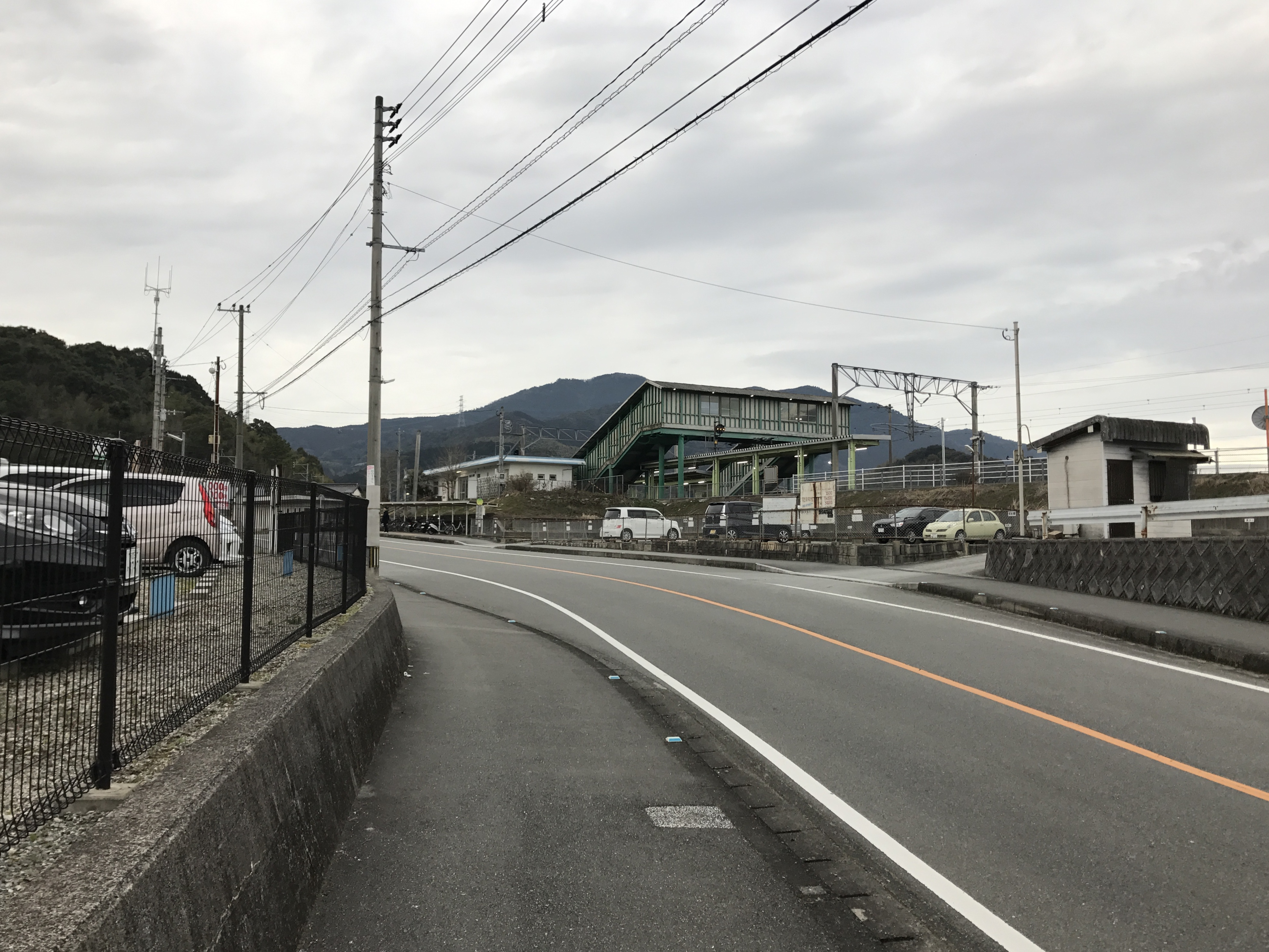
A distant view of the station, showing the embankment, bike sheds and parking lot.

== History ==
The station was opened by Japanese National Railways (JNR) on 25 May 1968 as an intermediate station when it extended the Sasaguri Line east from Sasaguri to Keisen. With the privatization of JNR on 1 April 1987, JR Kyushu took over control of the station.

== Passenger statistics ==
In fiscal 2021, there was a daily average of 482 boarding passengers at this station, making it the 224th busiest station on the JR Kyushu network.。

== Surrounding area ==
- Iizuka City Oita Elementary School
- Daibu temple ruins

== See also ==
- List of railway stations in Japan
