= Gifu Great Buddha =

Buddha statue in Japan

Coordinates: 35°25′57″N 136°46′19″E

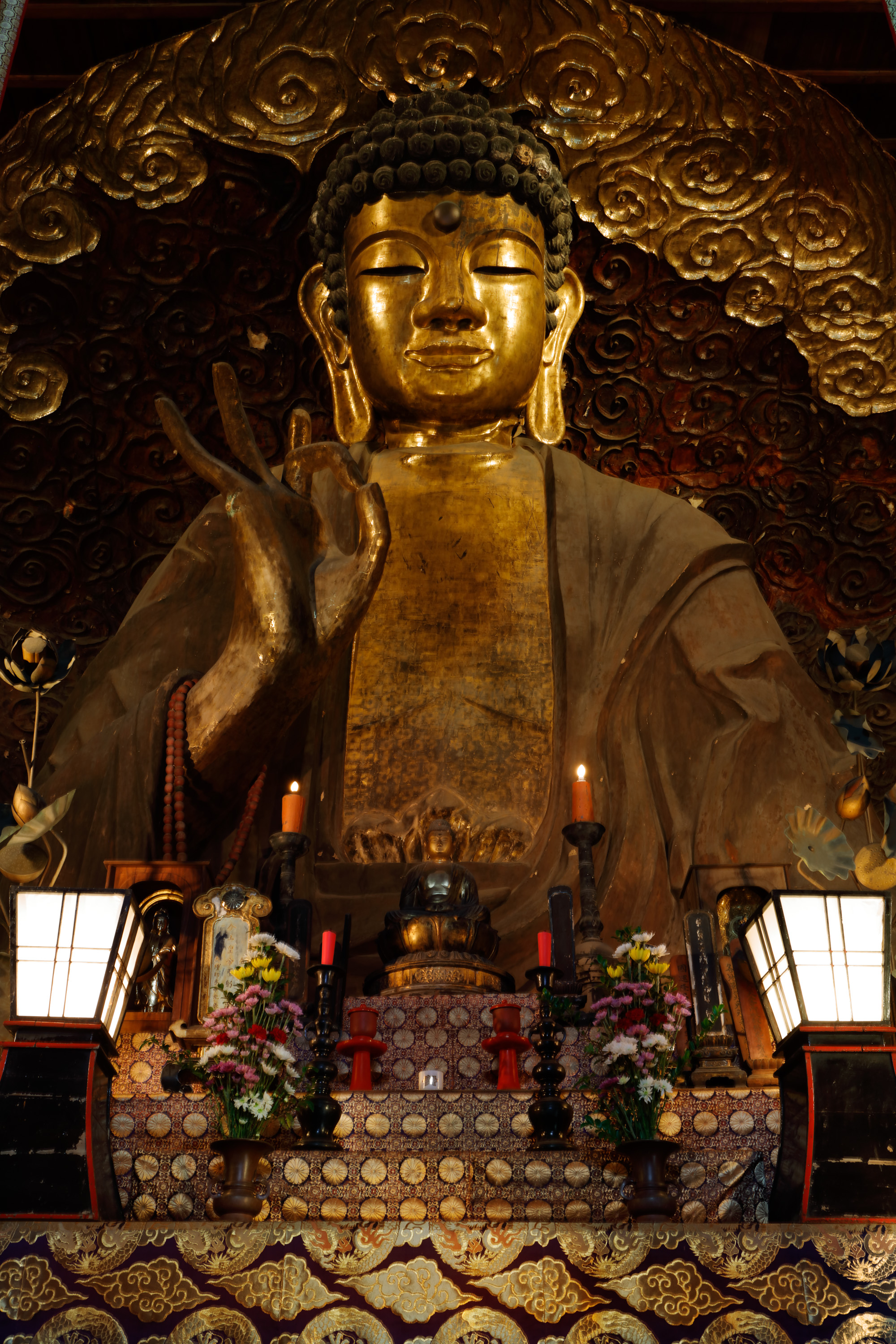
Gifu Great Buddha

The Gifu Great Buddha (岐阜大仏, Gifu Daibutsu) is a large Buddhist statue located in Shōhō-ji in Gifu City, Gifu Prefecture, Japan. It was conceived by the 11th head priest of Kinpouzan Shōhō temple, Ichyuu, around 1790, in hopes of averting large earthquakes and famines. Ichyuu died in 1815 before it was completed, but his successor, Priest Kohshuu completed it in April 1832, after 38 years of construction. It is one of the three great Buddha portrait statues in Japan.

== Construction ==
The Great Buddha of Gifu is unique due to the method of its construction. First, a central pillar 1.8 meters in circumference was formed from ginkgo tree wood. The Buddha's shape was then formed using bamboo lattices. The bamboo was covered with clay to add shape and many Buddhist scriptures were then placed upon the clay. Finally, the scriptures were covered in lacquer and gold leaf, giving the Buddha the appearance that it has today.

== Measurements ==
- Height of Statue: 13.7 metres (44.9 ft)
- Length of Face: 3.63 metres (11.9 ft)
- Length of Eyes: 0.66 metres (2.2 ft)
- Length of Ears: 2.12 metres (7.0 ft)
- Width of Mouth: 1.31 metres (4.3 ft)
- Height of Nose: 0.36 metres (1.2 ft)

== See also ==
- Daibutsu
  - Ushiku Daibutsu
- Dai Kannon of Kita no Miyako park
- Great Buddha of Thailand
- List of tallest statues

== Images ==
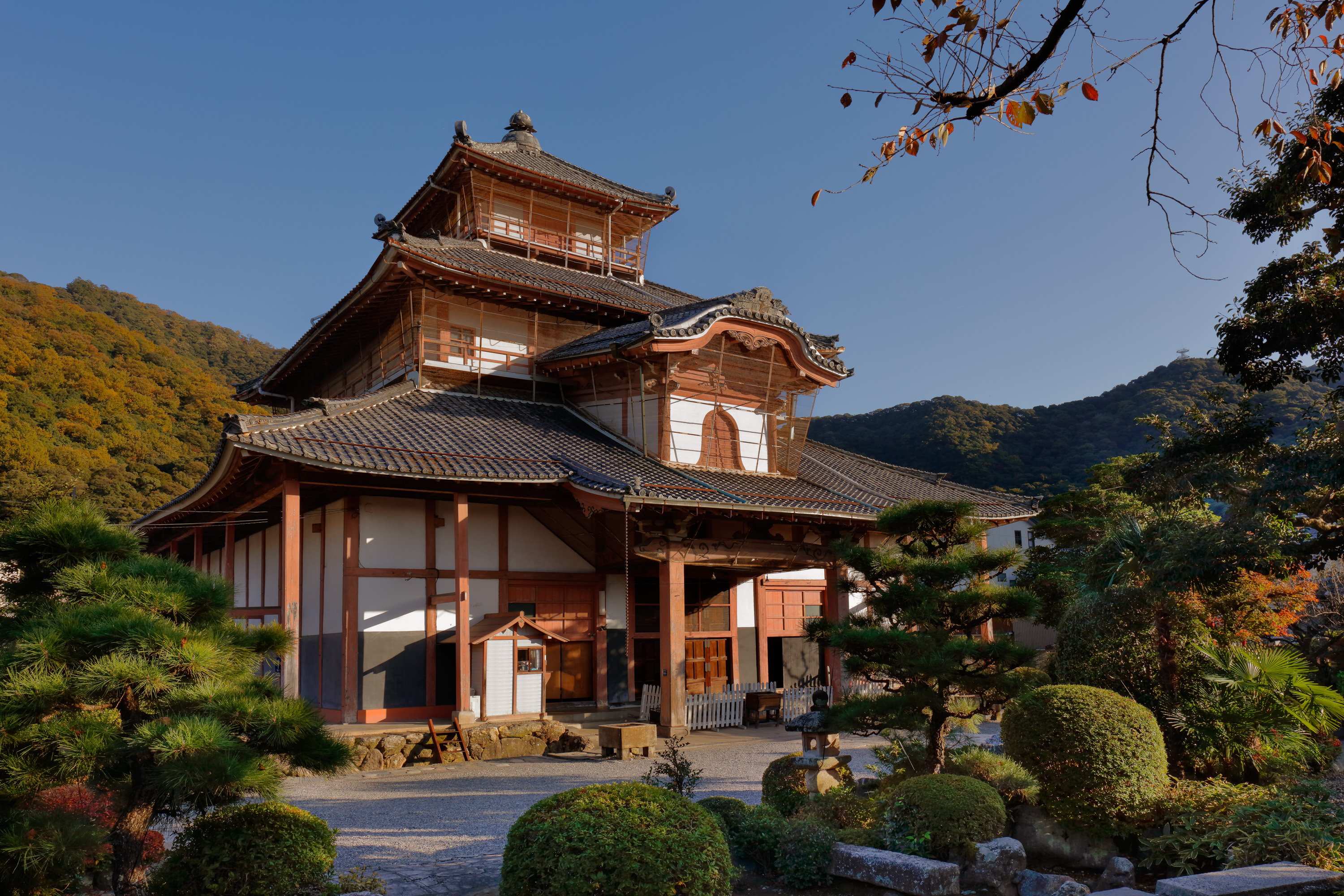
Shōhō-ji

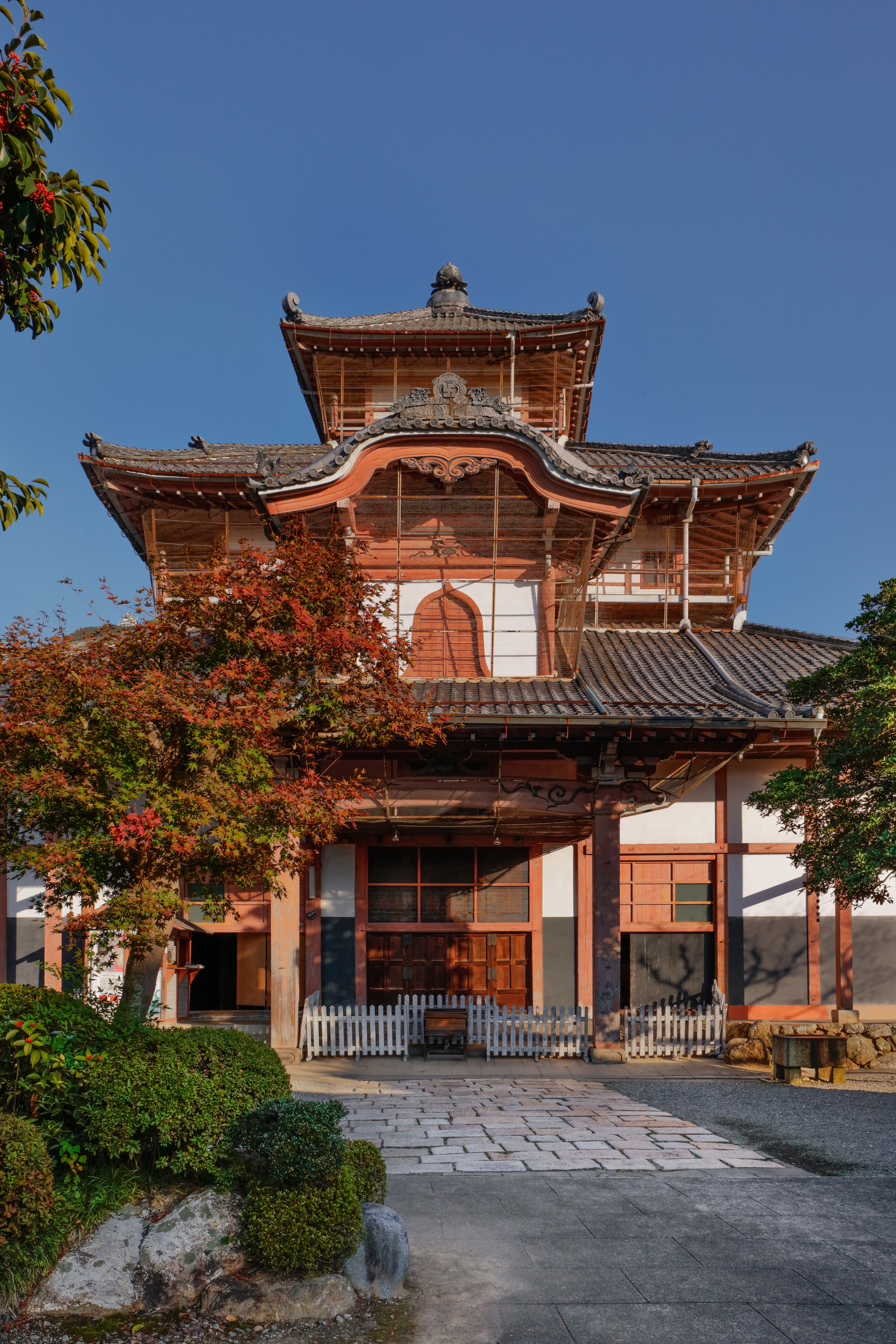
Shōhō-ji

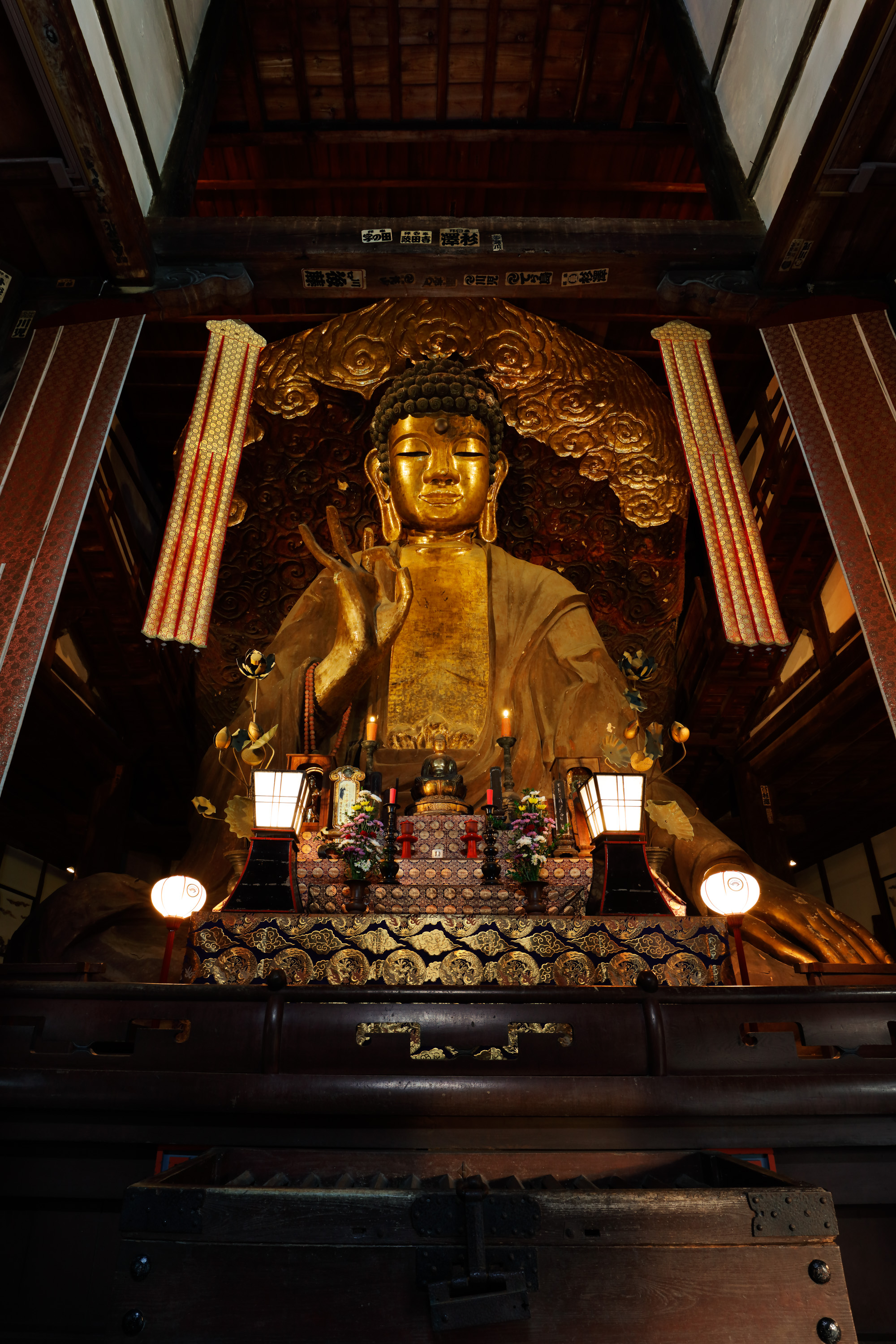

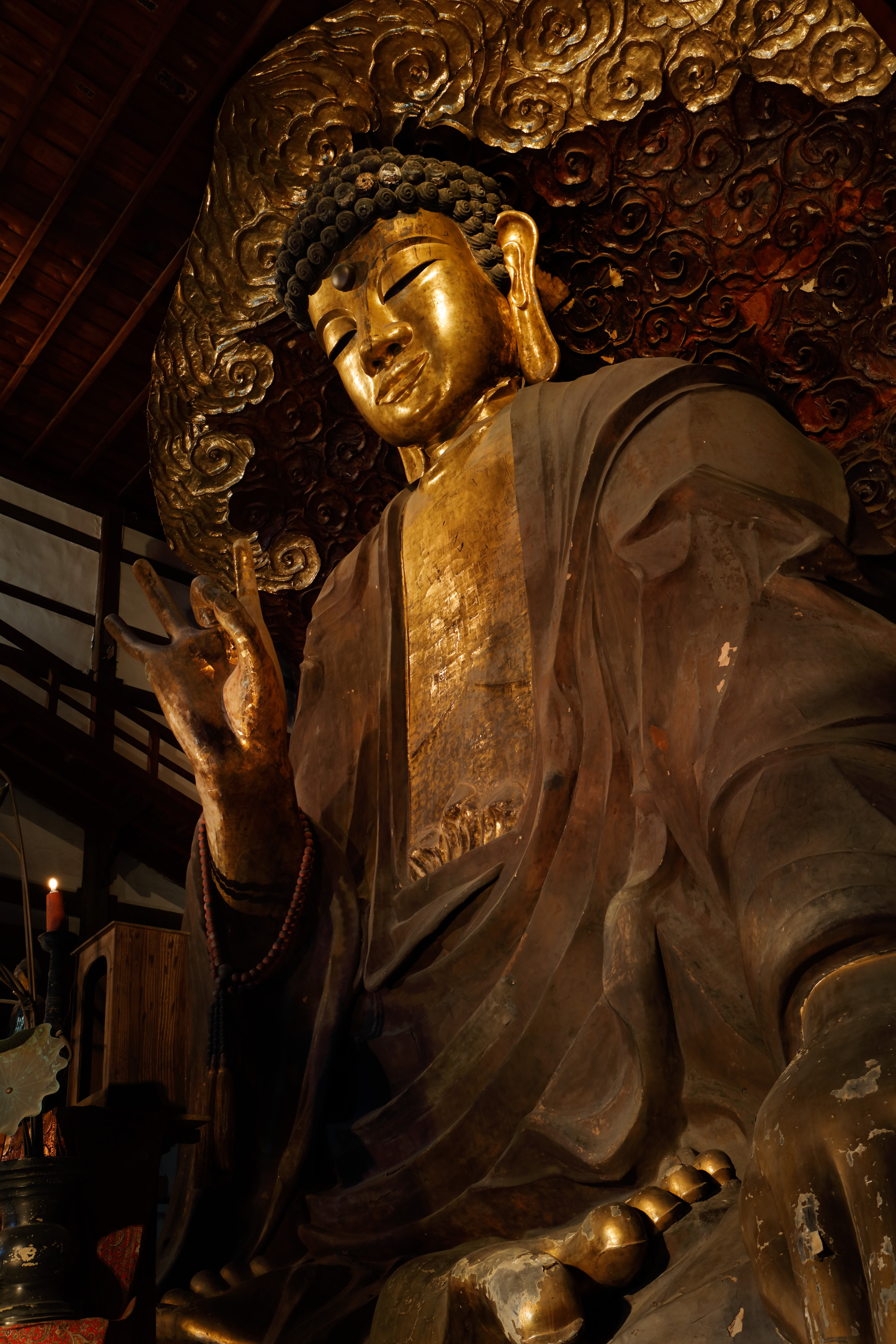

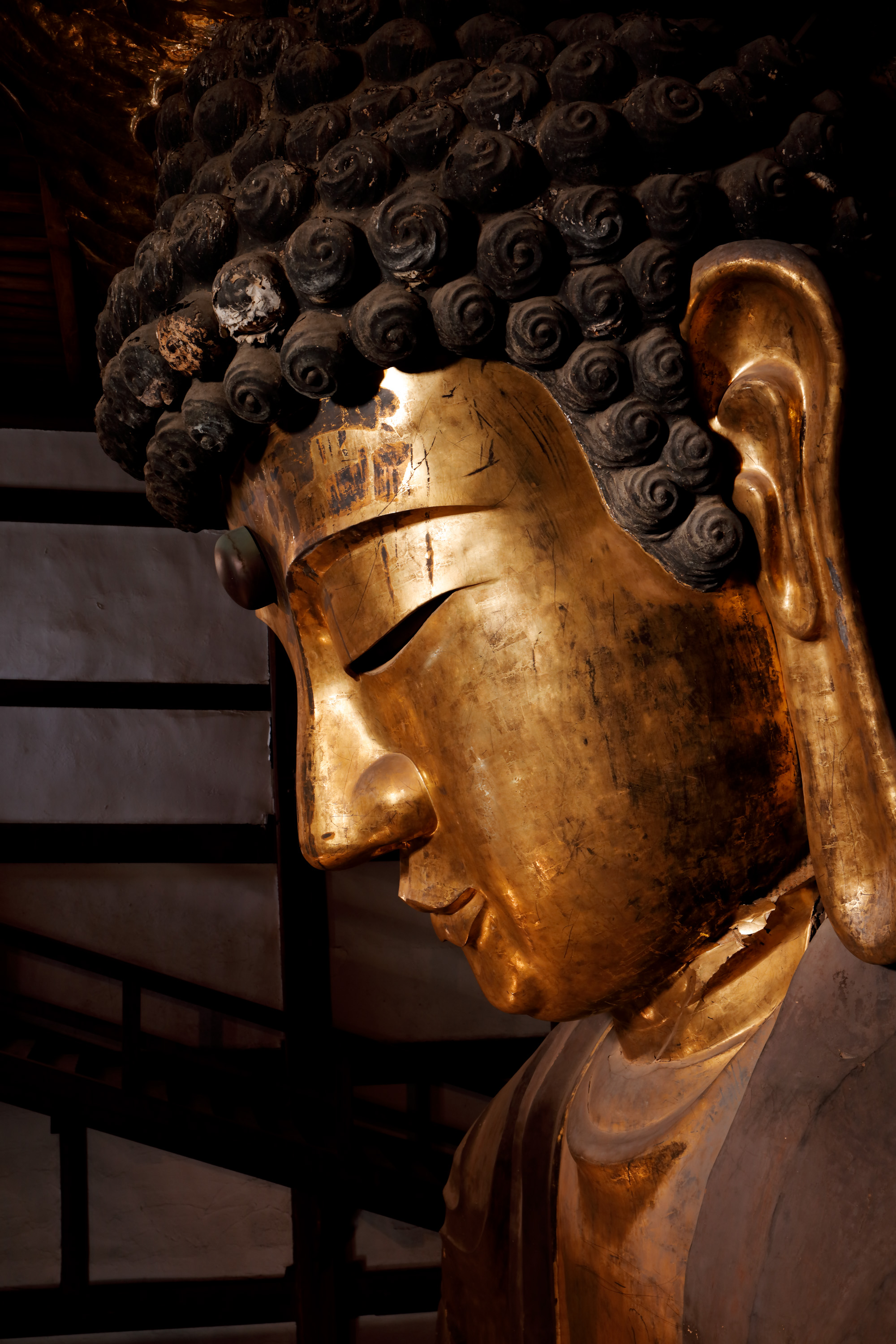

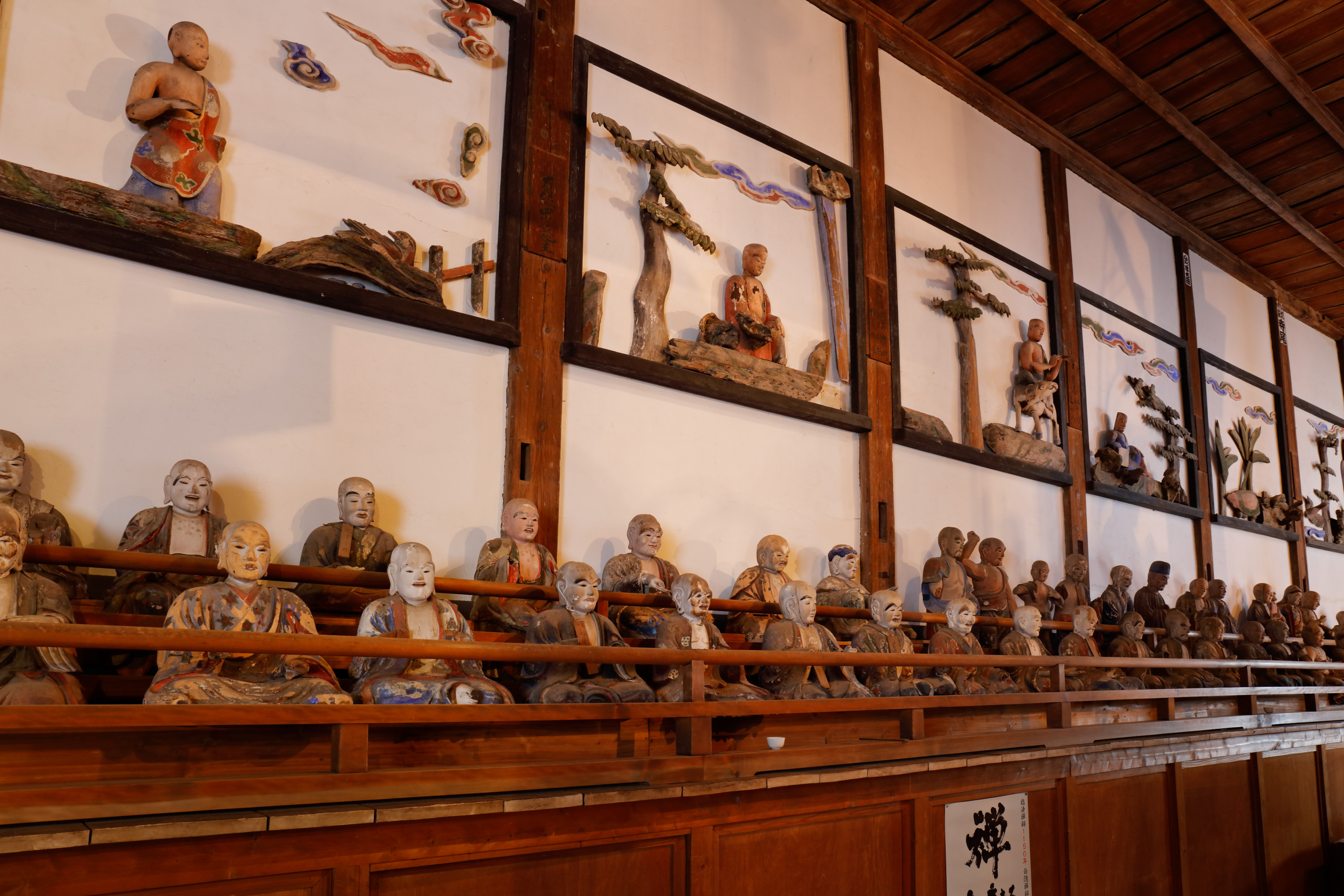

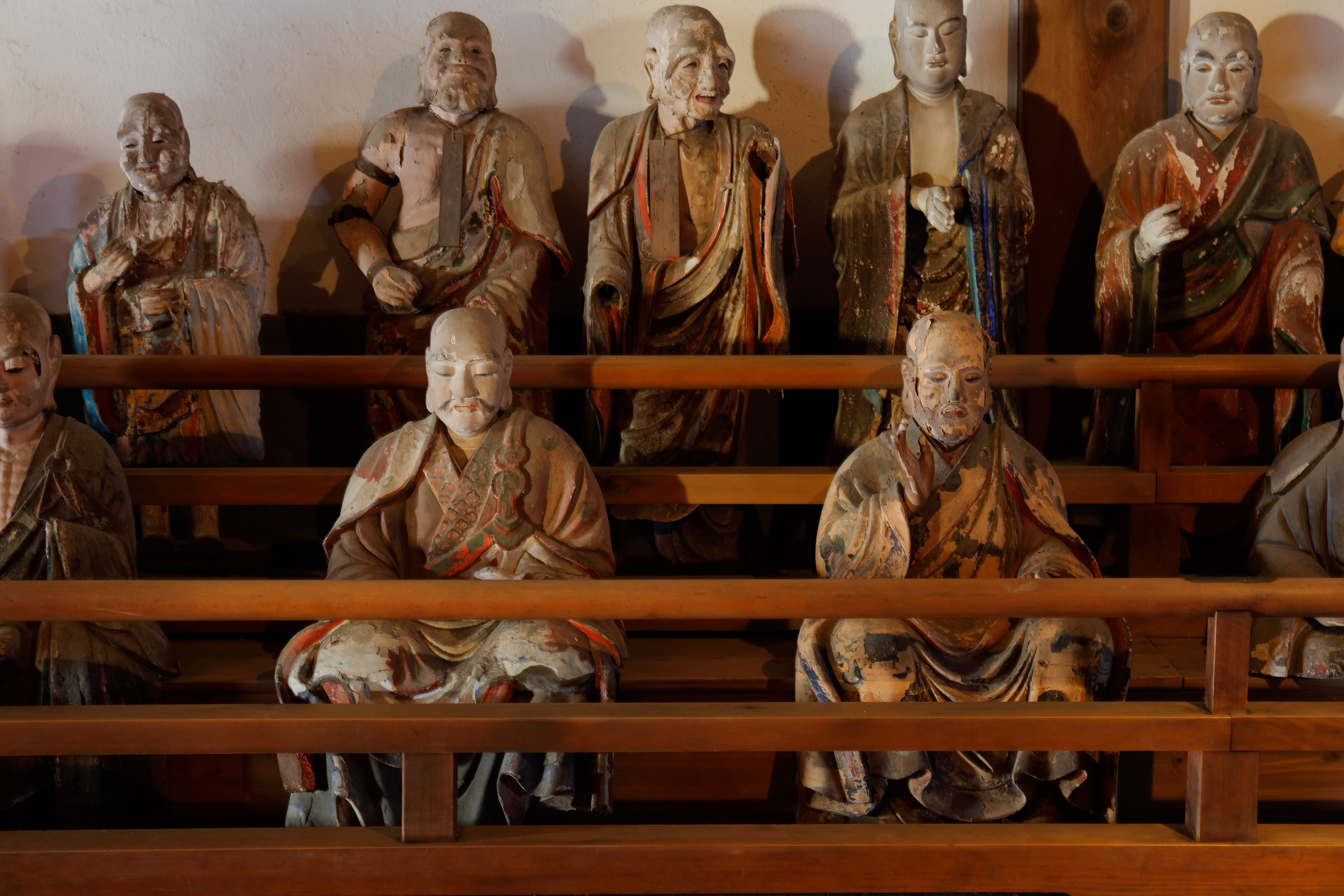
