= Kido-Nanzōin-mae Station =

Railway station in Sasaguri, Fukuoka Prefecture, Japan

JC 08 Kido-Nanzōin-mae Station 城戸南蔵院前駅
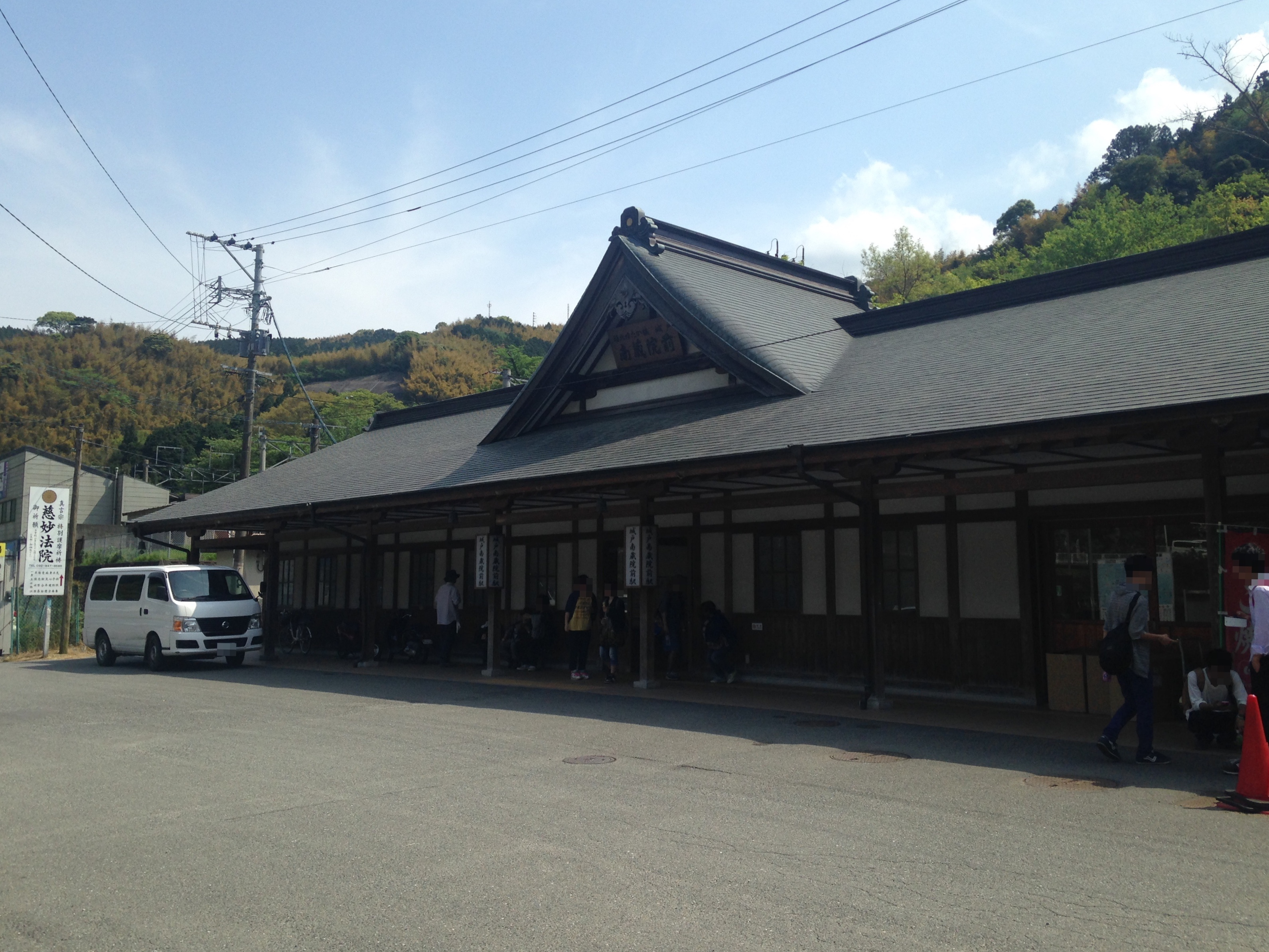
- Kido-Nanzōin-mae Station in 2015

General information
- Location: Sasaguri, Kasuya-gun, Fukuoka-ken 811-2405; Japan
- Coordinates: 33°37′06″N 130°34′20″E
- Operator: JR Kyushu
- Line: JC Sasaguri Line
- Distance: 14.9 km from Yoshizuka
- Platforms: 2 side platforms
- Tracks: 2

Construction
- Structure type: Embankment
- Parking: Available
- Accessible: No - platforms linked by underpass with steps

Other information
- Status: Kan'i itaku ticket window
- Website: Official website

History
- Opened: 25 May 1968
- Former names: Kido (Until 15 March 2003)

Passengers
- FY2019: 303 daily
- Rank: 300th (among JR Kyushu stations)

Services
Preceding station	JR Kyushu	Following station
Chikuzen-Yamate towards Hakata	Sasaguri Line Local	Kurōbaru towards Keisen
Location
- Location within Fukuoka Prefecture Location within Japan

Kido-Nanzōin-mae Station (城戸南蔵院前駅, Kido-Nanzōin-mae-eki) is a passenger railway station located in the town of Sasaguri, Fukuoka Prefecture, Japan. It is operated by JR Kyushu.

== Lines ==
The station is served by the Sasaguri Line and is located 14.9 km from the starting point of the line at Yoshizuka. The station is sometimes depicted on maps and timetables as part of the Fukuhoku Yutaka Line, of which the Sasaguri Line is a component.

== Station layout ==
The station consists of two side platforms serving two tracks at grade. A large station building in traditional Japanese architectural style houses a waiting room, a shop and a ticket window staffed by a kan'i itaku ticket agent. From the ticket gate, passengers enter an underpass which leads to two flights of steps, giving access to the two platforms. A large parking lot is available at the station forecourt.

=== Platforms ===
1	■ JC Sasaguri Line	for Keisen and Nōgata
2	■ JC Sasaguri Line	for Chōjabaru and Hakata

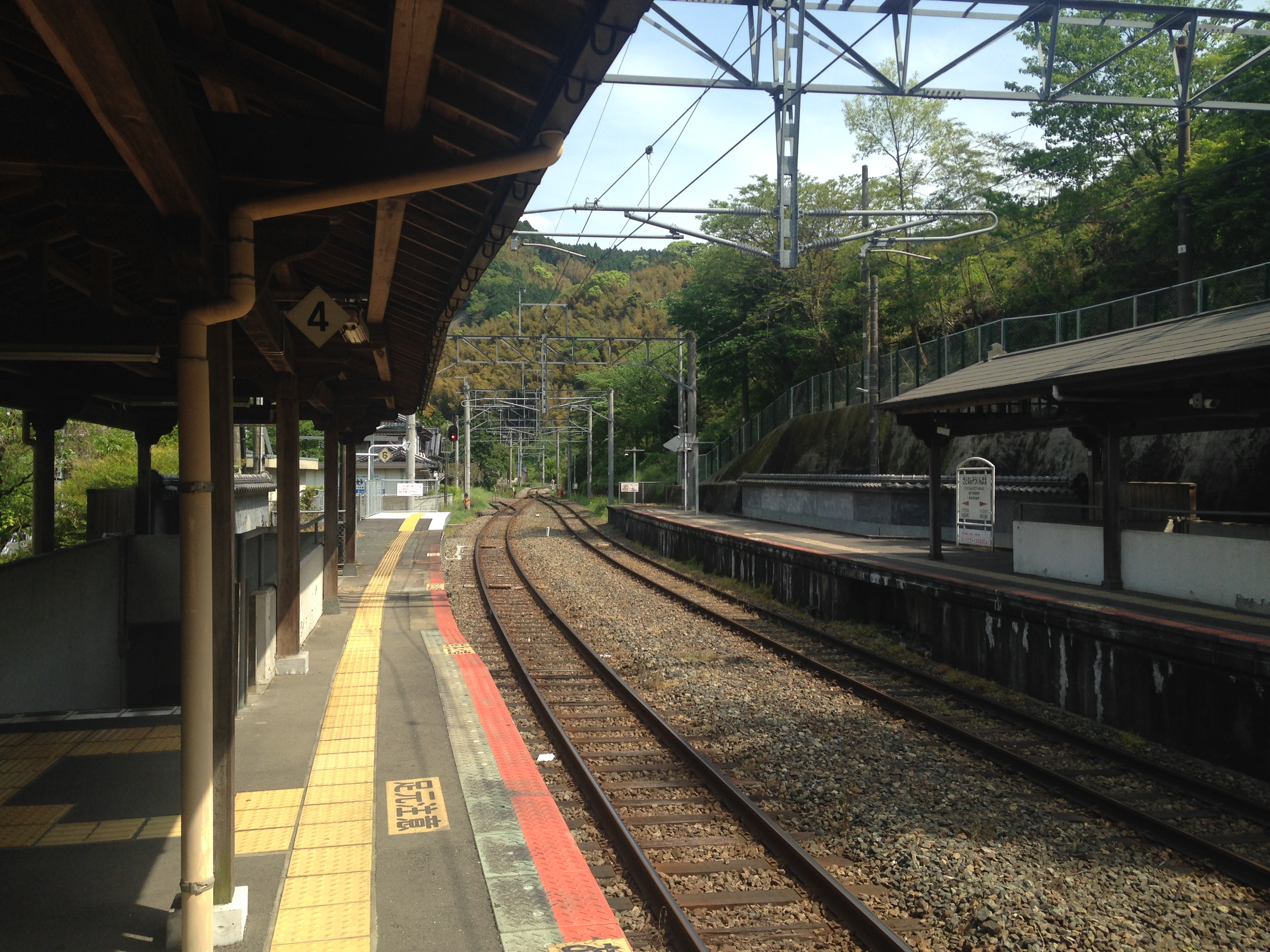
A view of the platforms and tracks looking in the direction of Kurōbaru.

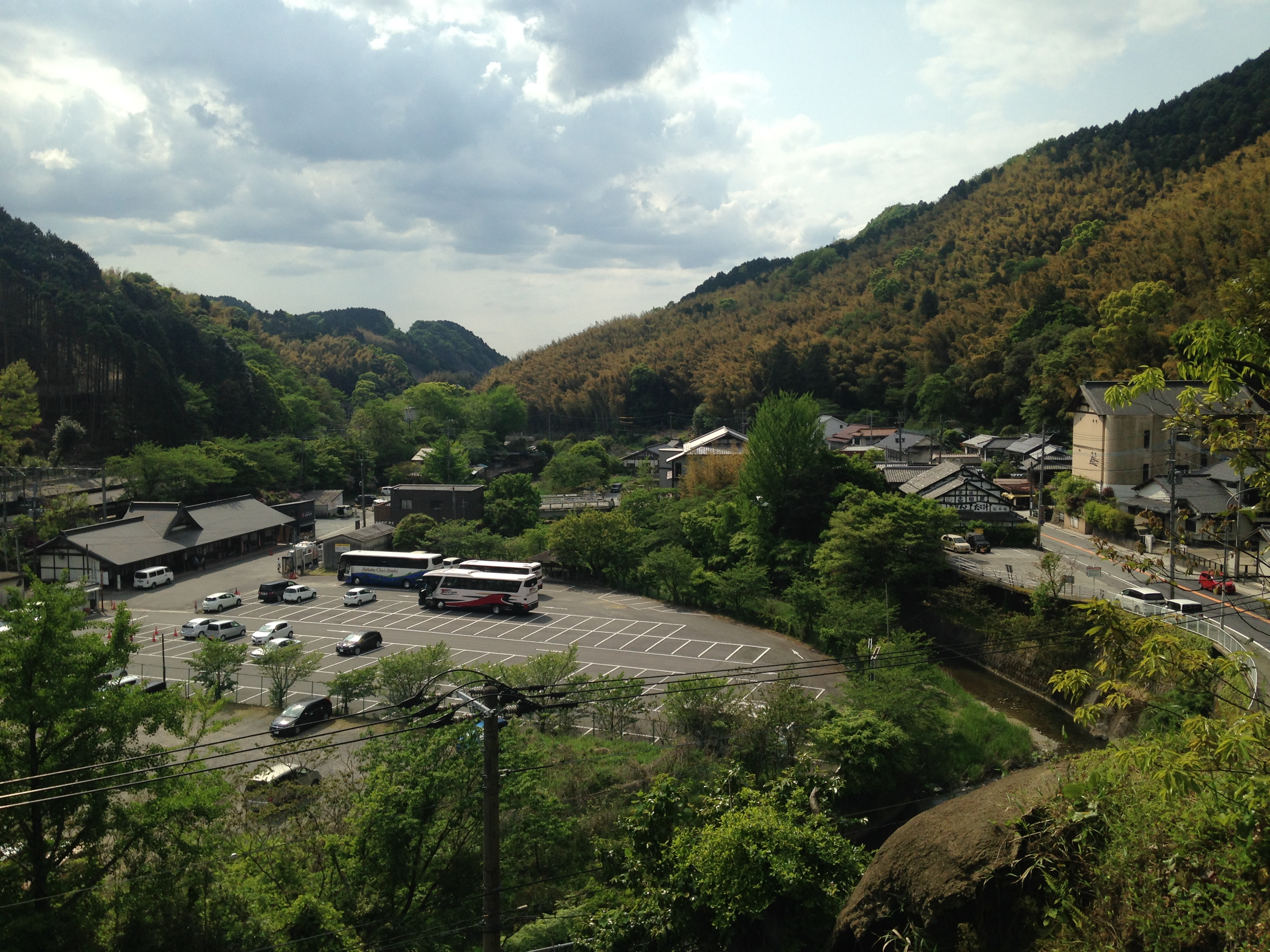
A distant view of the station showing the extensive parking lot at the station forecourt.

== History ==
The station was opened with the name Kido Station (城戸駅) by Japanese National Railways (JNR) on 25 May 1968 as an intermediate station when it extended the Sasaguri Line east from Sasaguri to Keisen. With the privatization of JNR on 1 April 1987, JR Kyushu took over control of the station. On 15 March 2003, the station name was changed to "Kido-Nanzōin-mae".

== Passenger statistics ==
In fiscal 2019, there was a daily average of 303 boarding passengers at this station, making it the 300th busiest station on the JR Kyushu network.。

== Surrounding area ==
The station is located near the Sasaguri Tunnel entrance. The Tatara River flows in front of the station, and there is a bridge with a glockenspiel sound board attached to it. Across the bridge is National Route 201, which runs parallel to the Sasaguri Line. The area between the station and the national highway is lined with souvenir shops. The area around the station is dotted with temples that are part of the Sasaguri New Shikoku 88 Sacred Sites, including Nanzoin.

== See also ==
- List of railway stations in Japan
