= Daibu temple ruins =

- 大分廃寺跡 (Japanese)
- Daibu temple ruins Daibu temple ruins (Japan)
- 33°35′05″N 130°38′09″E
- Type: temple ruins
- Periods: Nara period
- Location: Iizuka, Fukuoka, Japan
- Region: Kyushu

History
- Built: 8th century AD

Site notes
- Public access: Yes (no facilities)
- National Historic Site of Japan

Daibu temple ruins (大分廃寺跡, Daibu Haiji ato) is an archaeological site with the ruins of the foundations of a Japanese pagoda from a Nara period Buddhist temple located in the city of Iizuka, Fukuoka Prefecture, Japan. It was designated as a National Historic Site in 1941.

== Overview ==
The Daibu temple ruins are located approximately one kilometer east of the Daibu Hachiman-gu, a former shrine of Hakozaki Shrine which was built in 726 AD. The temple was constructed in the early 8th century, and was on a large scale; however, it does not appear in any historical records, and the name and history of the temple are completely unknown. It is located along the ancient road linking Hakata Port with the Tagawa region of Buzen Province. The ruins of the pagoda foundations have been known for a long time and are in almost perfect condition, making this a valuable temple site from the early Nara period. The pagoda foundation is a platform that is about one meter higher than the surrounding area, and there are 17 cornerstones centered on the core. From the spacing of holes, it is estimated that the pagoda was a three-story pagoda over 30 meters in height. The large core foundation that supported the central pillar of the pagoda has a posthole with a diameter of approximately 80-cm, and has two grooves facing outward, which may have prevented water from accumulating. Subsequent archaeological excavations revealed that the temple area was estimated to be approximately 94 meters north-to-south and approximately 102 meters east-to-west. Traces of the Main Hall have been found to the left of the pagoda, indicating that the temple layout may have been patterned after Hokki-ji in Ikaruga, Nara. In addition, Silla-style and Baekje-style roof tiles with lotus patterns were excavated.

The site is approximately a 15-minutes walk from Chikuzen-Daibu Station on the JR Kyushu Sasaguri Line.

== See also ==
- List of Historic Sites of Japan (Fukuoka)
