= Narufuchi Dam =

Dam in Fukuoka Prefecture, Japan

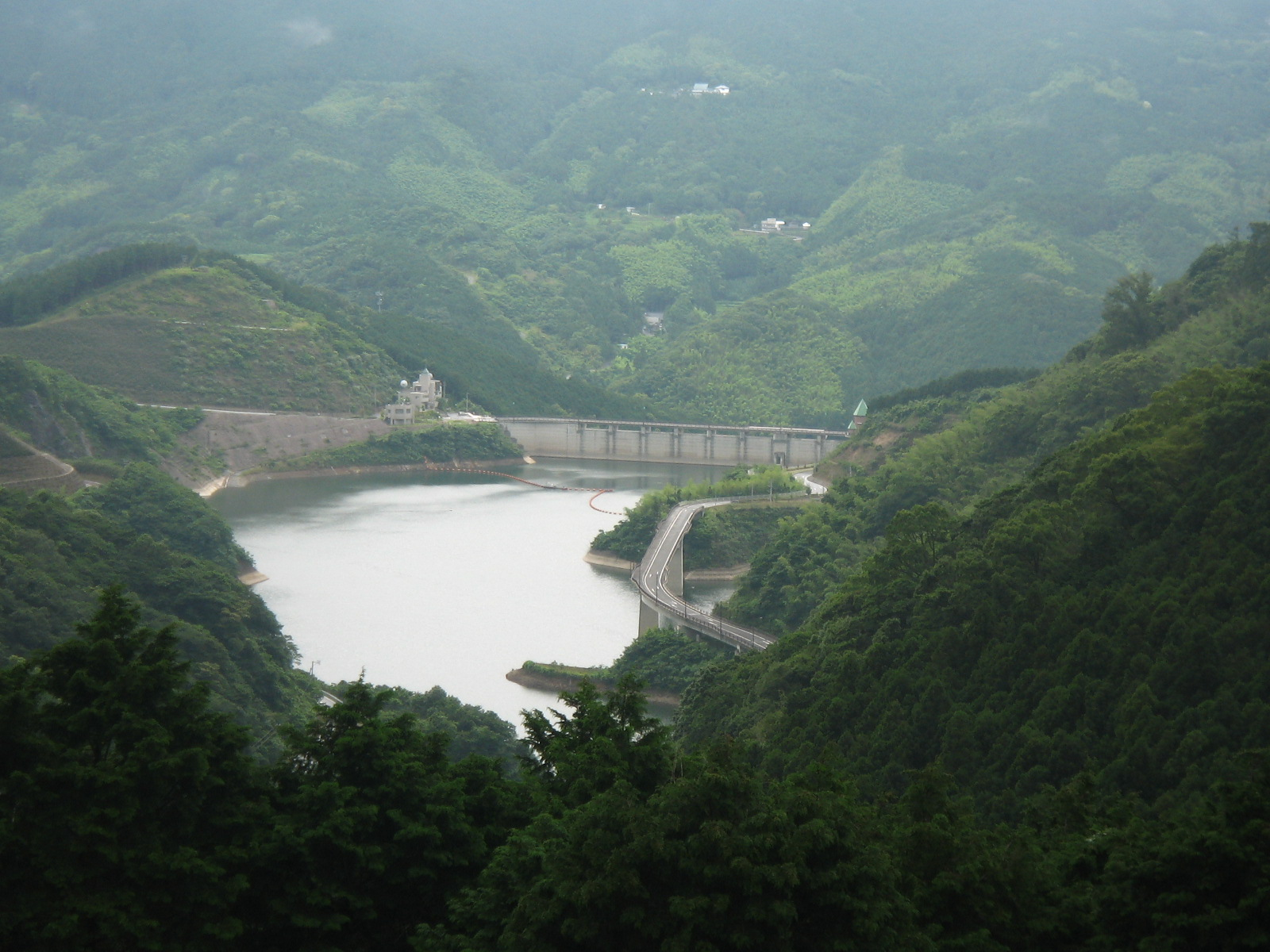
- Interactive map of Narufuchi Dam
- Location: Fukuoka Prefecture, Japan.

Narufuchi Dam is a dam in Sasaguri, in the Fukuoka Prefecture of Japan, completed in 2001.
