= Sasaguri, Fukuoka =

Sasaguri 篠栗町
- Town
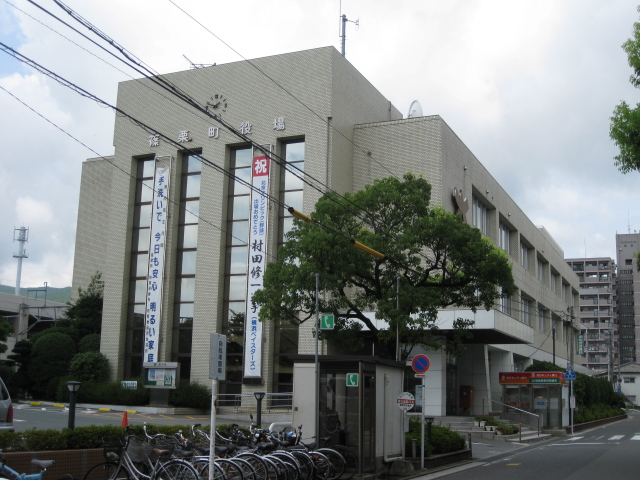
- Sasaguri Town Hall

- Flag Chapter
- Location of Sasaguri in Fukuoka Prefecture

- Location in Japan
- Coordinates: 33°37′26″N 130°31′34″E
- Country: Japan
- Region: Kyushu
- Prefecture: Fukuoka
- District: Kasuya

Area
  - Total: 38.93 km^{2} (15.03 sq mi)

Population (March 31, 2024)
  - Total: 31,191
  - Density: 801.2/km^{2} (2,075/sq mi)
- Time zone: UTC+09:00 (JST)
- City hall address: 1-1-1 Chuo, Sasaguri-cho, Kasuya-gun, Fukuoka-ken 811-2492
- Website: Official website
- Symbols
- Bird: Oriental turtle dove
- Flower: Orchidaceae
- Tree: Cryptomeria

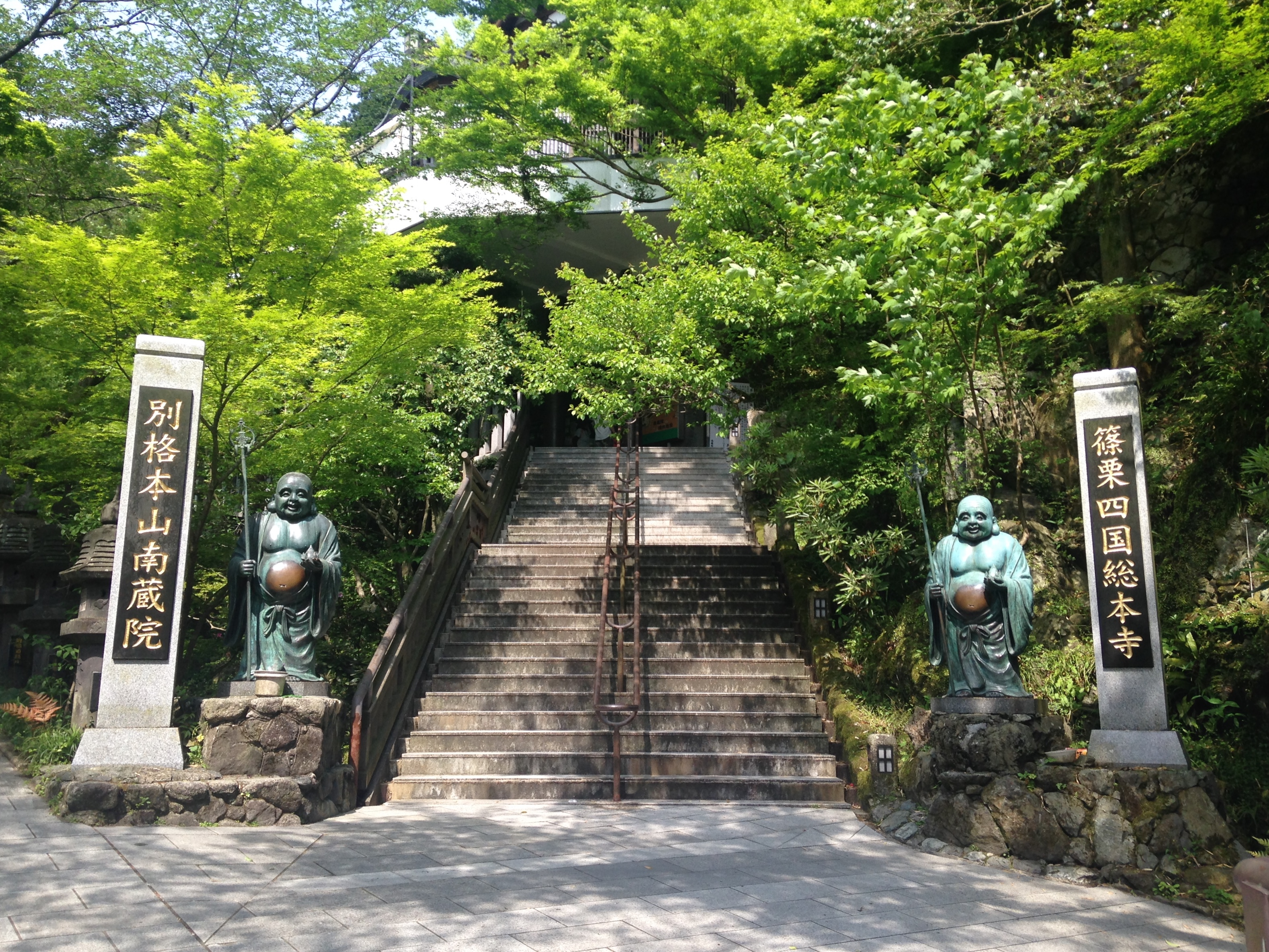
Gate of Nanzo-in temple

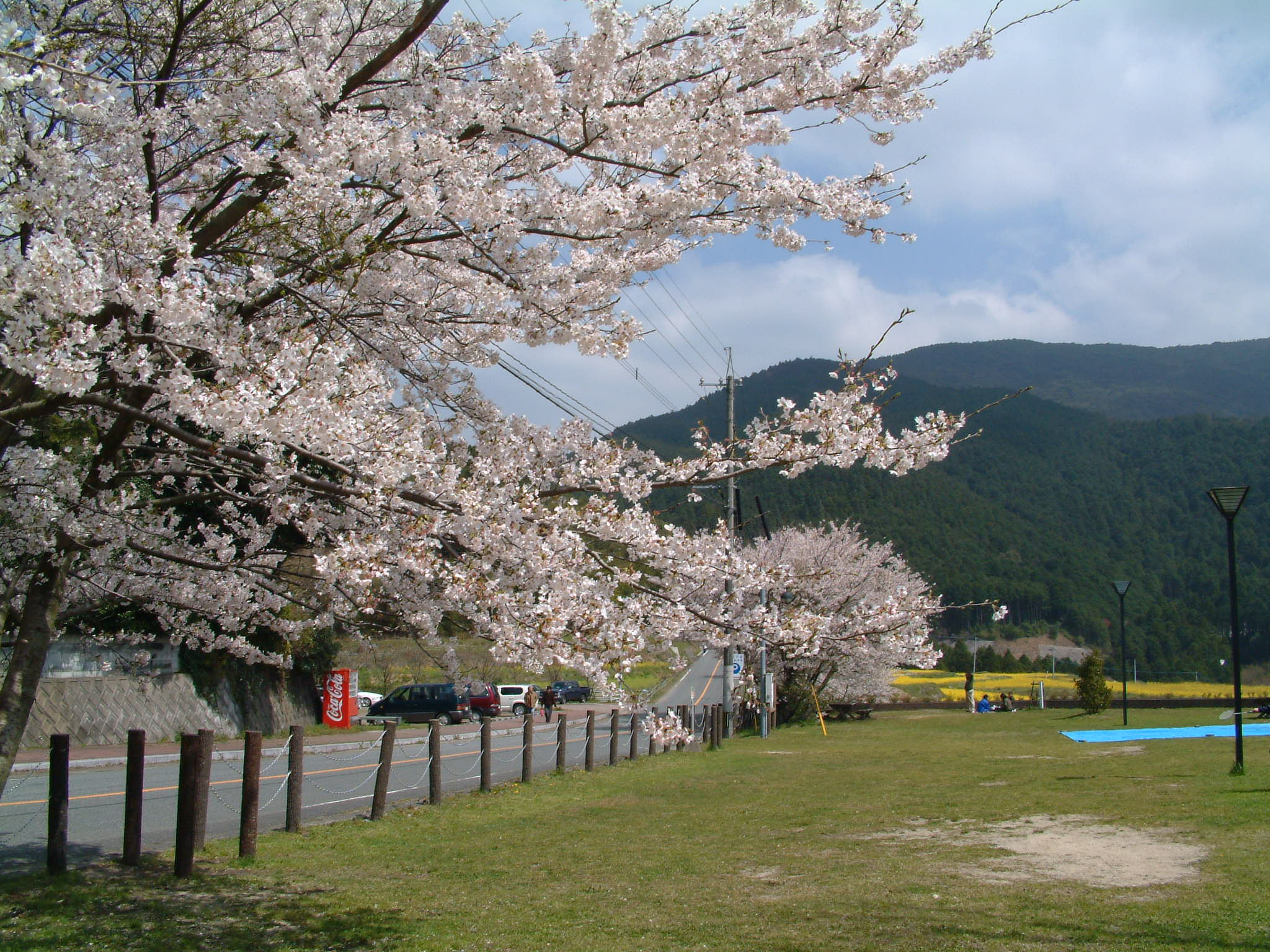
Sakura in Jugei Forest

Sasaguri (篠栗町, Sasaguri-machi) is a town in Kasuya District, Fukuoka Prefecture, Japan. As of 31 March 2024, the town had an estimated population of 31,191 in 14041 households, and a population density of 250 persons per km². The total area of the town is 38.93 km^{2} (15.03 sq mi)

== Geography ==
Sasaguri is located 12 kilometers east of Fukuoka city. Sasaguri Station is located slightly west of the geographic center of the town, and the area surrounding the station forms the central urban area. The city center and the area to the west of it are relatively flat, on the eastern edge of the Fukuoka Plain. To the east of the city center is a mountainous region that separates the Fukuoka metropolitan area from Chikuho. The Tatara River flows east-west through the town. The town jointly manages the 17-hectare Sasaguri Kyudai Forest with Kyushu University.

=== Neighboring municipalities ===
Fukuoka Prefecture

- Iizuka
- Hisayama
- Kasuya
- Miyawaka
- Sue

=== Climate ===
Sasaguri has a humid subtropical climate (Köppen Cfa) characterized by warm summers and cool winters with light to no snowfall. The average annual temperature in Sasaguri is 15.2 °C. The average annual rainfall is 1766 mm with September as the wettest month. The temperatures are highest on average in August, at around 26.5 °C, and lowest in January, at around 4.4 °C.

=== Demographics ===
Per Japanese census data, the population of Sasaguri is as shown below.

Historical population
Year	Pop.	±%
1940	12,422	—
1950	14,903	+20.0%
1960	14,039	−5.8%
1970	14,855	+5.8%
1980	19,662	+32.4%
1990	23,267	+18.3%
2000	29,389	+26.3%
2010	31,327	+6.6%
2020	31,209	−0.4%

== History ==
The area of Sasaguri was part of ancient Chikuzen Province. During the Edo Period, the area was under the control of Fukuoka Domain. After the Meiji restoration, the villages of Sasaguri and Seto were established with the creation of the modern municipalities system on April 1, 1889. The Sasaguri was raised to town status on January 1, 1927, and annexed Seto on April 1, 1955.

== Government ==
Sasaguri has a mayor-council form of government with a directly elected mayor and a unicameral town council of 12 members. Sasaguri, together with the other municipalities in Kasuya District contributes three members to the Fukuoka Prefectural Assembly. In terms of national politics, the town is part of the Fukuoka 4th district of the lower house of the Diet of Japan.

== Economy ==
There used to be a coal mine in the northwestern part of town, but it closed in the 1960s. After that, an industrial park (Totetsu Kogyo Danchi) was established; however, the main focus of the local economy is on agriculture and tourism.

== Education ==
Sasaguri has three public elementary schools and two public junior high schools operated by the town government. The town does not have a high school.

== Transportation ==
=== Railways ===
JR Kyushu - Sasaguri Line

JC Sasaguri - Chikuzen-Yamate - Kido-Nanzōin-mae

=== Highways ===
- National Route 201

== Local attractions ==
- Narufuchi Dam.
- Nanzo-in, temple known for its 41 metres (135 ft) reclining Buddha statue, considered one of the largest bronze statues in the world. Nanzo-in is the initial temple on the 88-temple Sasaguri pilgrimage route.
