= Shōhō-ji (Gifu) =

Buddhist temple in Gifu Prefecture, Japan

Shōhō-ji 正法寺
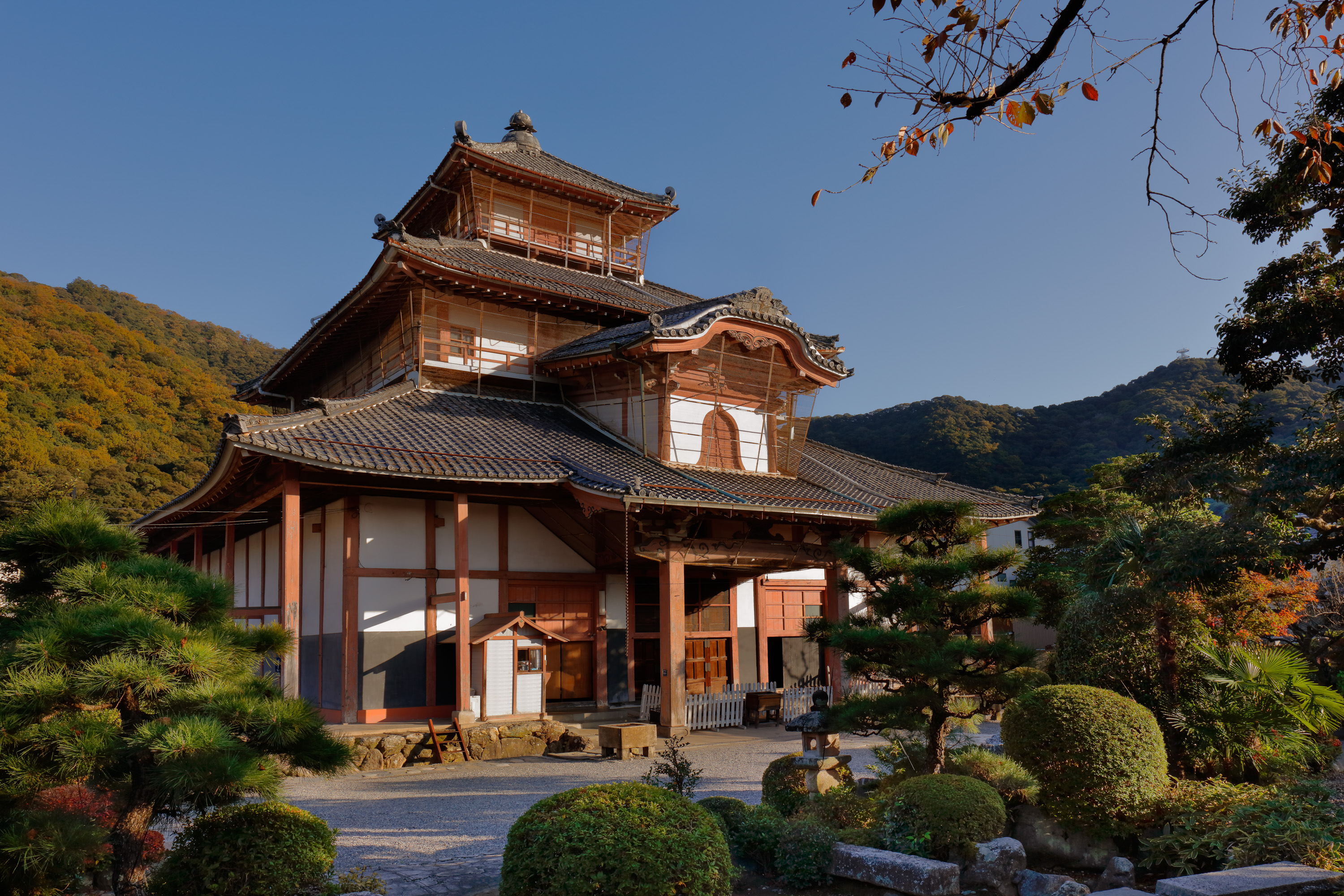
- Shoho-ji

Religion
- Affiliation: Ōbaku school

Location
- Location: 8 Daibutsu-chō; Gifu, Gifu Prefecture
- Country: Japan
- Interactive map of Shōhō-ji 正法寺

Architecture
- Completed: 1638

Website
- Shōhō-ji Great Buddha (in English); Shōhō-ji Great Buddha (in Japanese)

Shōhō-ji (正法寺) is a Buddhist temple of the Ōbaku school of Buddhism in Gifu, Gifu Prefecture, Japan. It is a branch temple of Mampuku-ji in Uji, Kyoto Prefecture. The temple has many aspects of the Ōbaku school, but its building style and sacraments are in the Chinese style. Additionally, it is much larger than the average Japanese temple. The temple's official name is Kinpōzan Shōhō-ji (金鳳山正法寺).

== History ==
The temple was first established in 1638, but did not join the Ōbaku school until 1692. In 1790, Ichū (推中), the 11th head priest, began planning the construction of the Gifu Great Buddha out of respect for Tōdai-ji's Great Buddha in Nara. Ichū never saw the completed Buddha, as he died in 1825. The Great Buddha was finally completed in 1832.

== Images ==
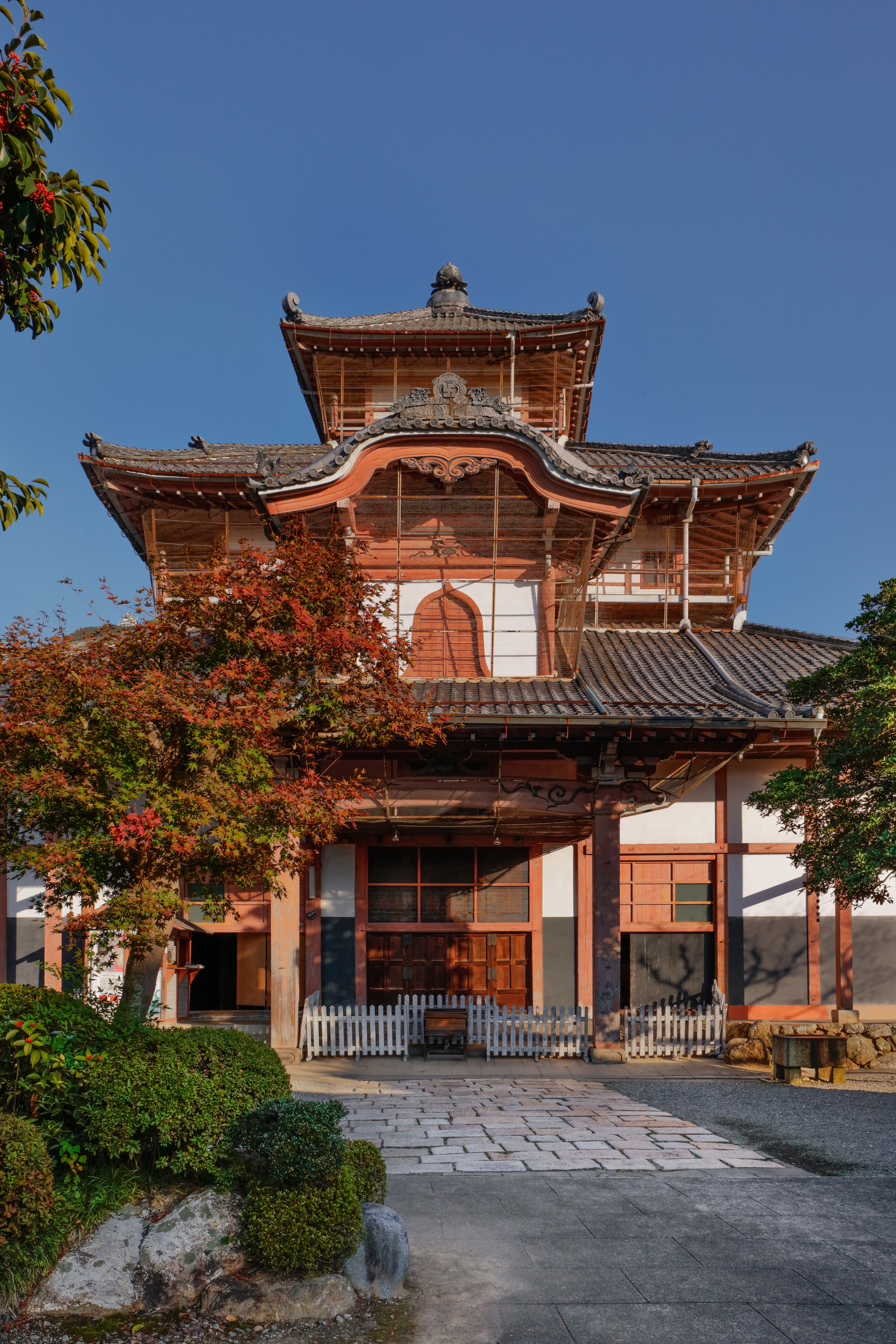
Shoho-ji

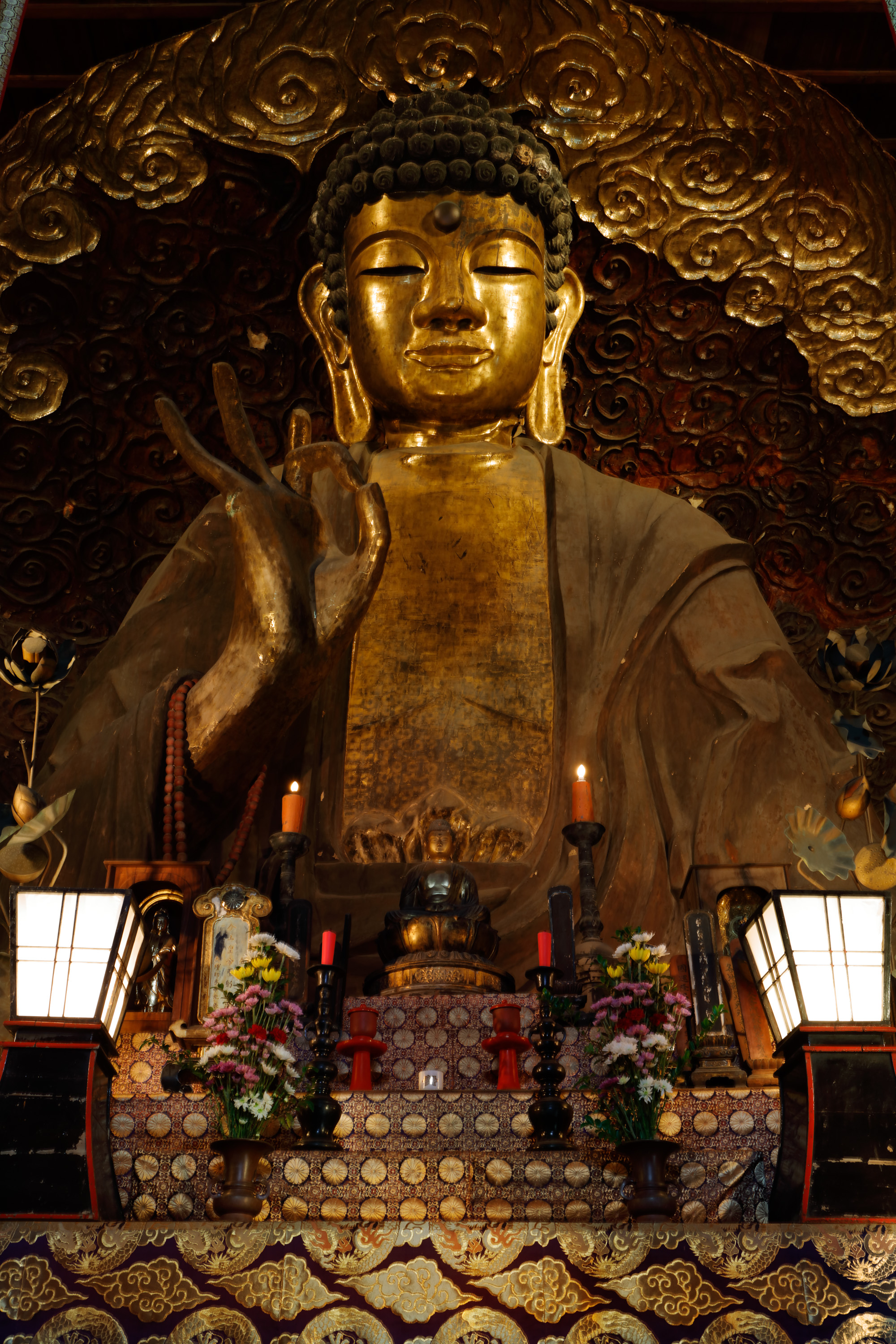
Gifu Great Buddha

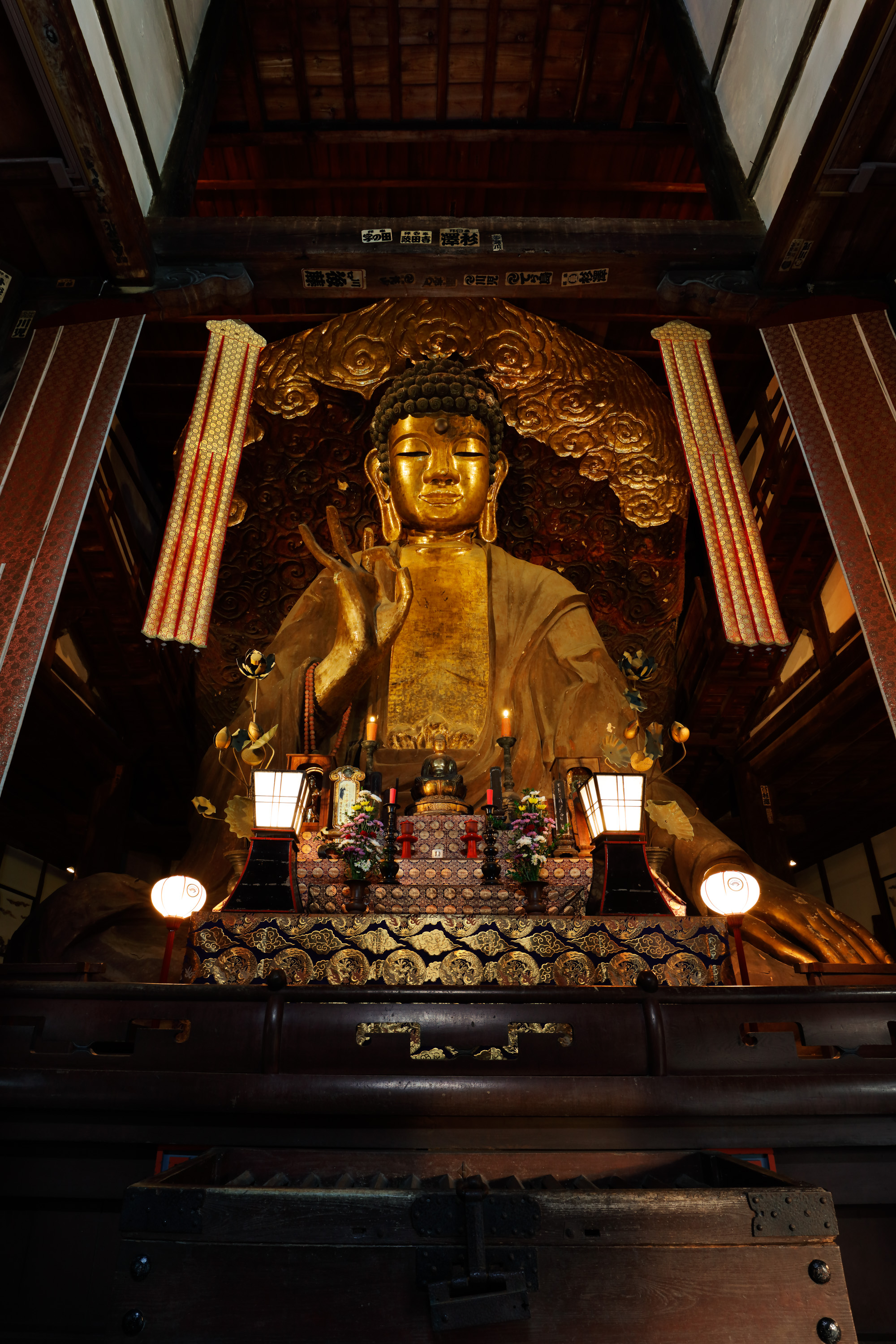

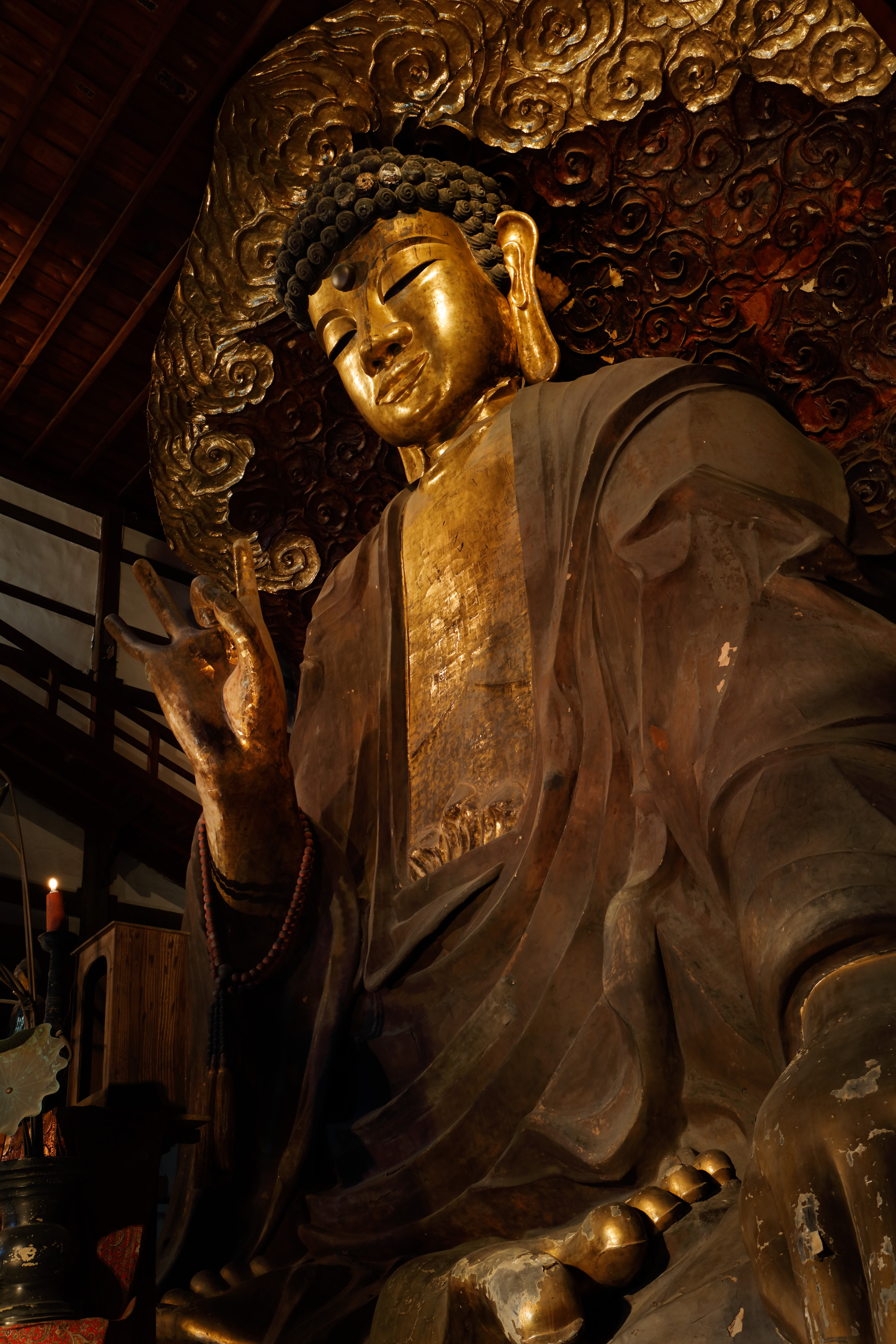

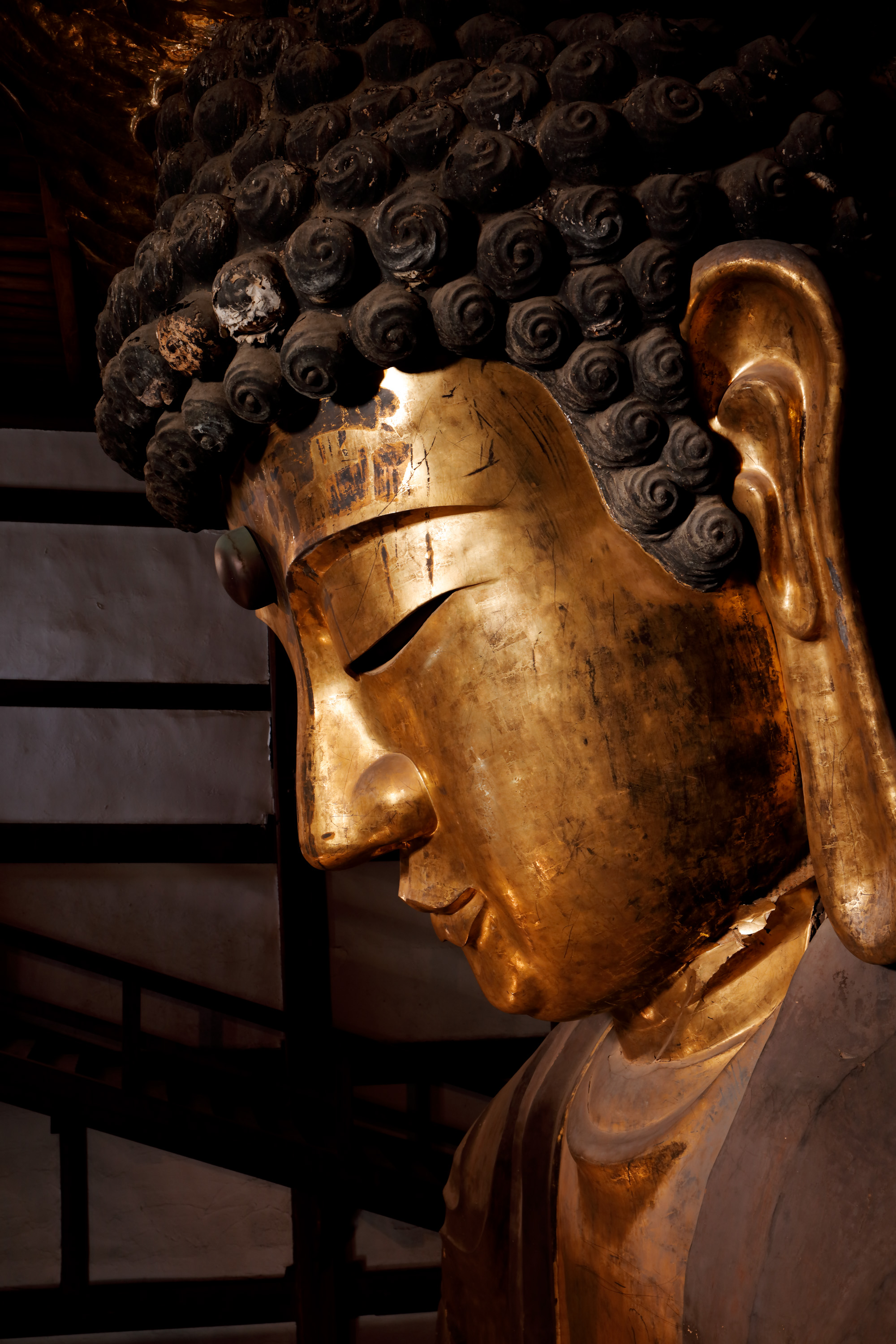

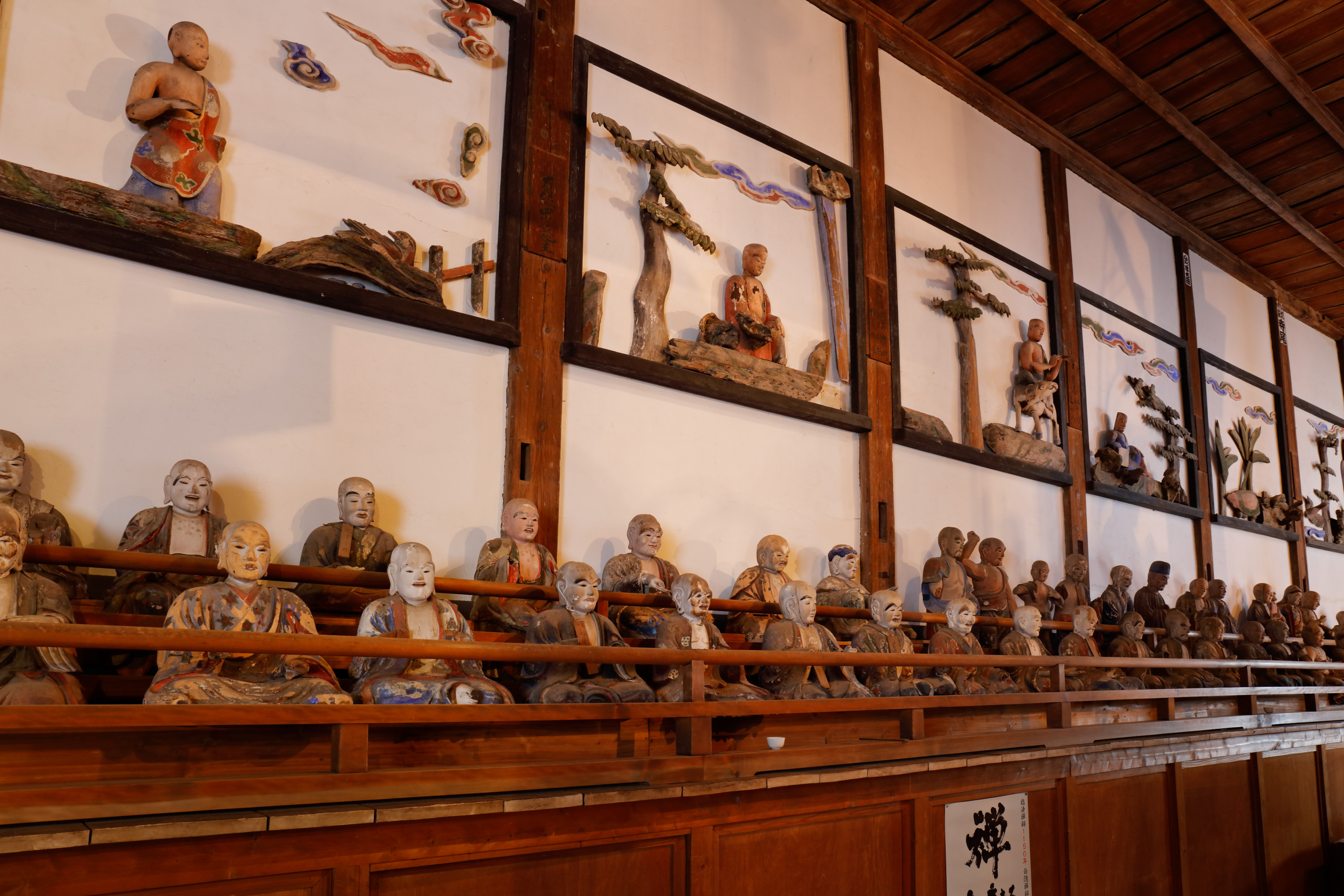

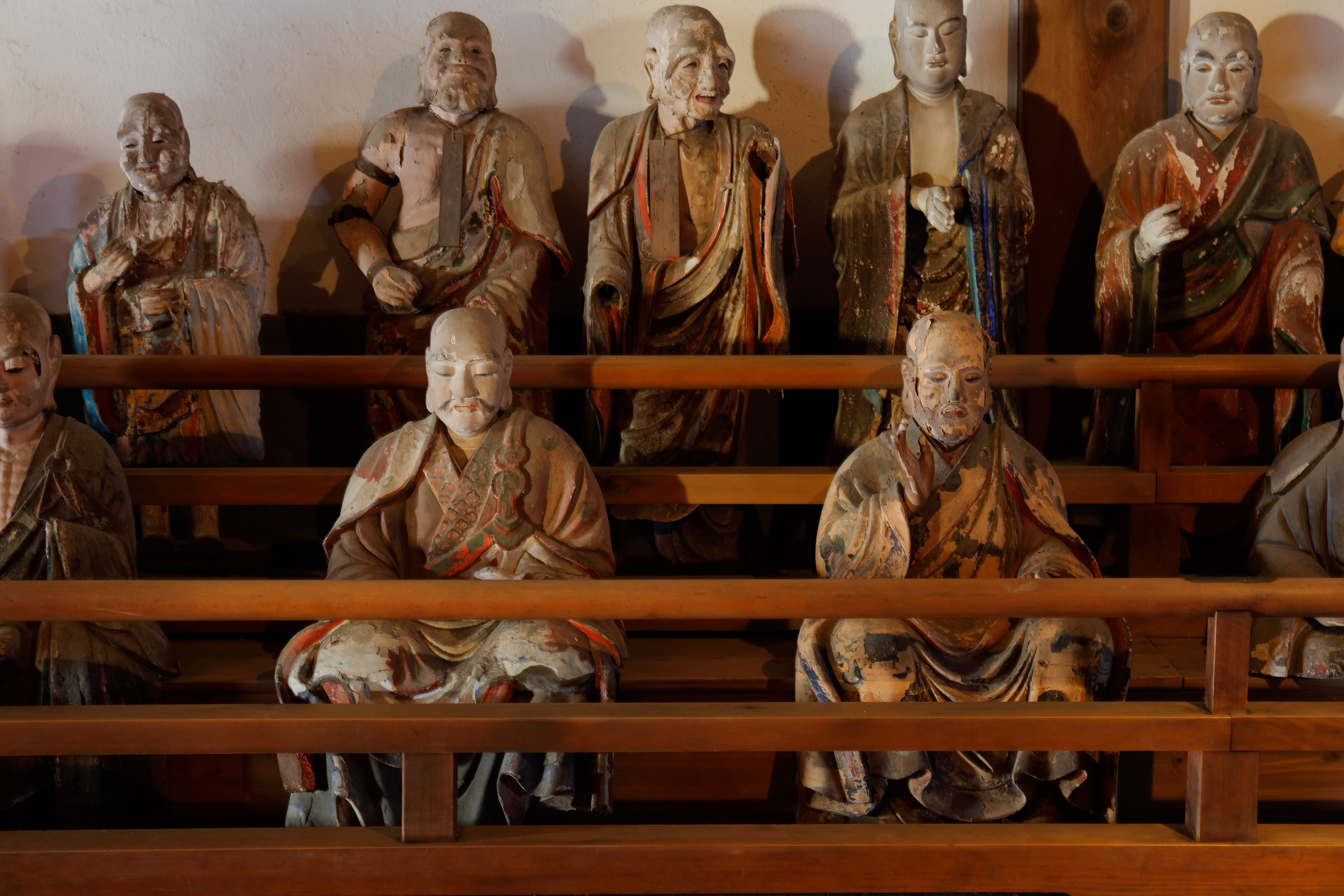
