= Nanzo-in =

Buddhist temple in Sasaguri, Fukuoka, Japan

Coordinates: 33.619839°N 130.572935°E

Nanzo-in 南蔵院
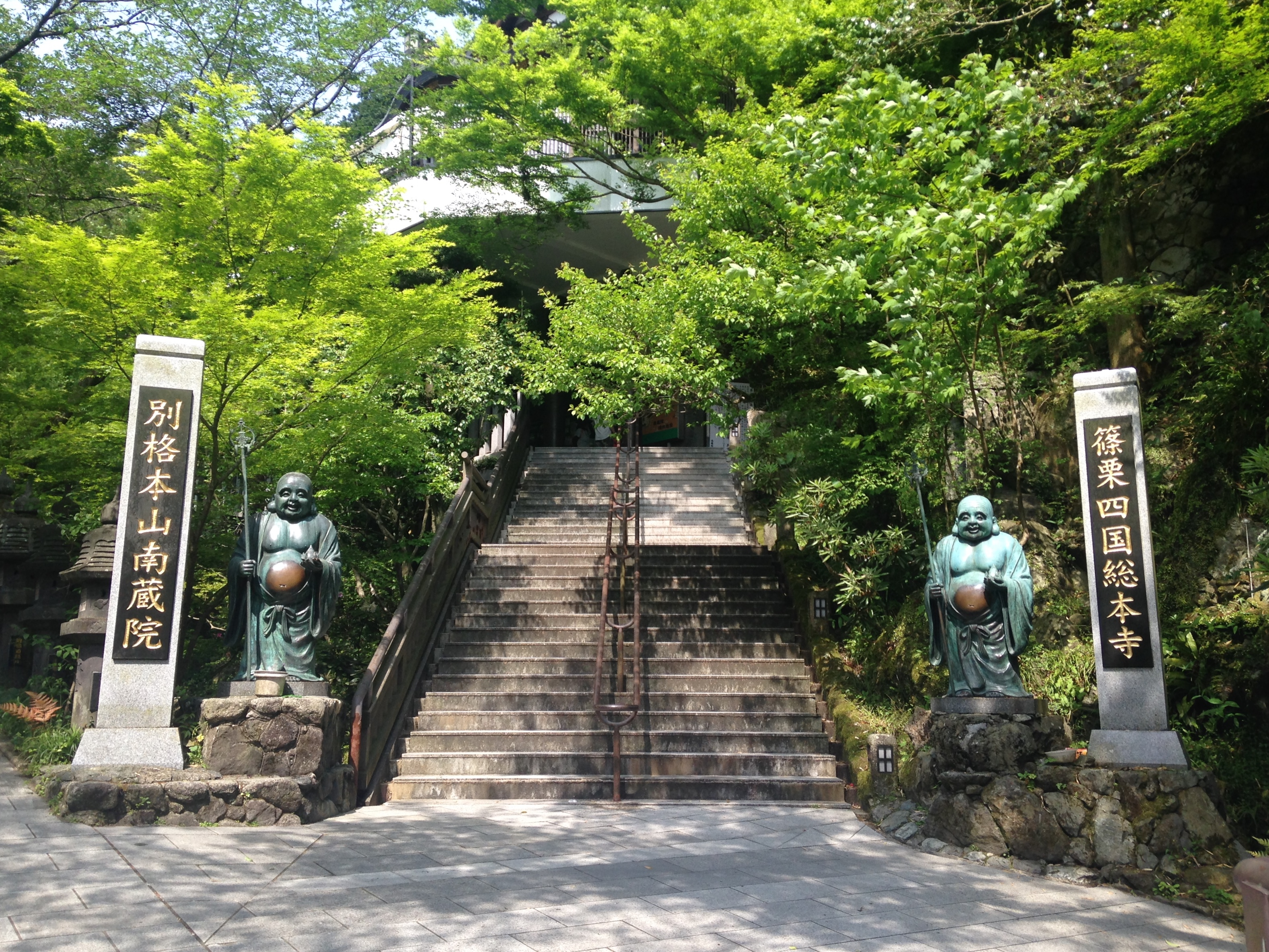

Religion
- Affiliation: Shingon

Location
- Location: 1035, Sasaguri, Sasaguri-machi, Kasuya-gun, Fukuoka
- Country: Japan
- Interactive map of Nanzo-in 南蔵院

Architecture
- Founder: Hayashi Satoshiun
- Completed: 1899

Website
- https://www.nanzoin.net/

Nanzo-in (南蔵院^{?}) is a Shingon Buddhist temple in Sasaguri, Fukuoka, Japan. It is notable for its bronze statue of a reclining Buddha, said to be the largest bronze statue of the Buddha reclining as he enters Nirvana in the world.

== History ==
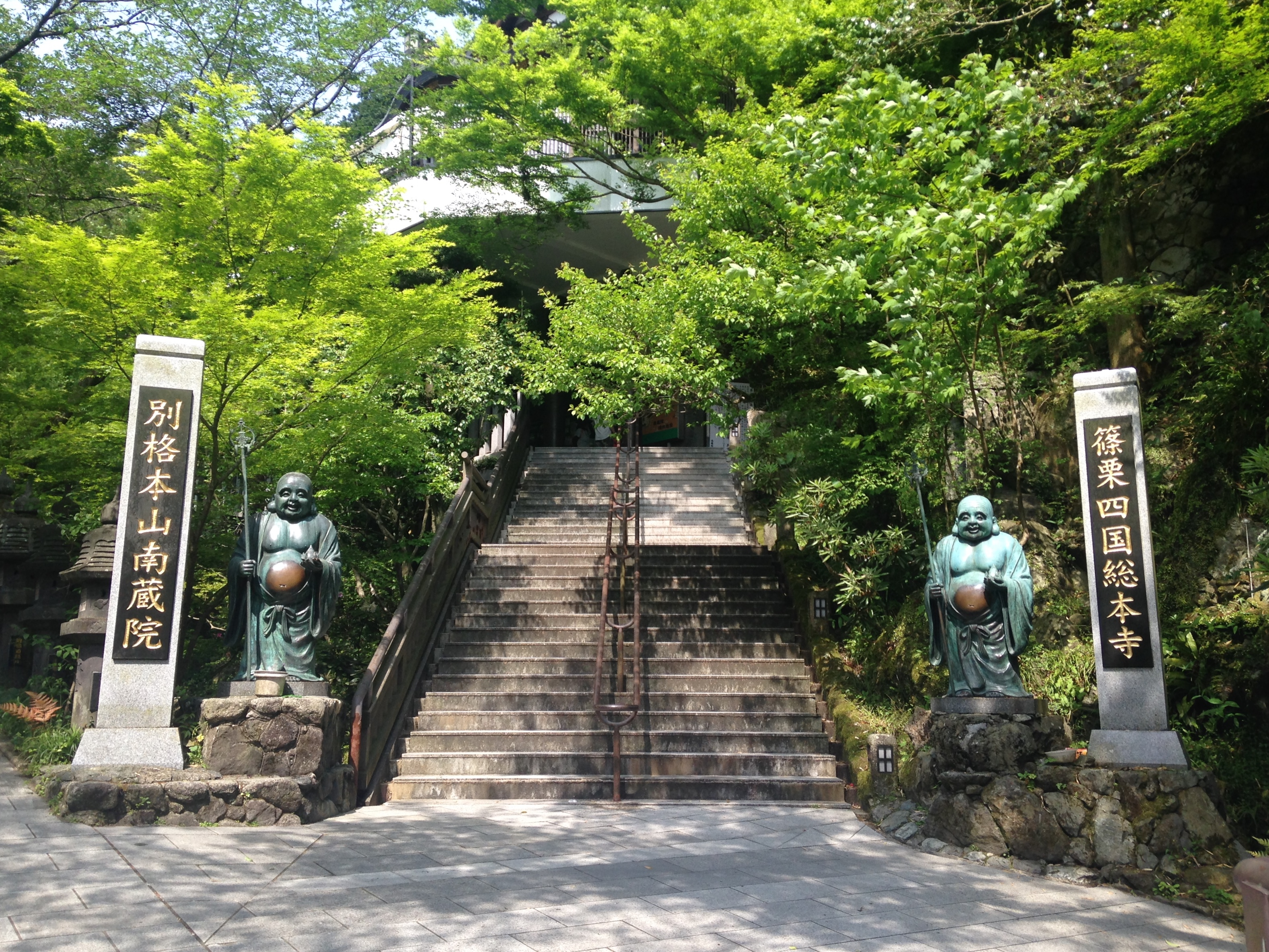
Gate to Nanzo-in in Sasaguri, Fukuoka, Japan

Nanzo-in was originally located on Mount Kōya, but local anti-Buddhist authorities threatened to destroy the temple in 1886. Public outcry lead to a decade-long effort to have the temple transferred to Sasaguri. It was moved in 1899, under the leadership of Sasaguri priest, Hayashi Satoshiun. Nanzo-in is the main location among the 88 temples that make up the Sasaguri pilgrimage route, one of the three famous walking pilgrimages in Japan.

Today, the temple and its surrounding grounds receive more than 1 million visitors annually.

=== Lottery ===
A chief priest of Nanzo-in once won the lottery after laying his ticket next to a statue of Daikoku. The temple claims that others who have made a similar effort have also won the lottery, bringing the temple associations with luck and lottery tickets.

== Reclining Buddha ==
The reclining Buddha statue, known as either Nehanzo or Shaka Nehan ("Nirvana") is 41 metres (135 ft) long, 11 metres (36 ft) high, and weighs nearly 300 tons. The statue depicts Buddha at the moment of death, or entrance into nirvana.

The interior holds ashes of Buddha and two Buddhist adherents, Ānanda and Maudgalyayana. Those relics were a gift from Myanmar as thanks for the sect's donations of medical supplies to children in both Nepal and Myanmar. In 1995, 1,300 monks from Myanmar and Nepal attended the unveiling of the reclining Buddha statue.

Inside the sculpture, sand from each of the 88 shrines that make up the Shikoku pilgrimage are stored below bricks within a narrow hallway.

Every year, hundreds of Buddhists come together to clean the statue using bamboo leaves tied to five-meter poles.

== Funerals ==
Nanzo-in has 4,315 nokotsudo, places where bones of the deceased are stored. The temple has a non-traditional fee structure for housing remains that is open to all sects of Buddhism, as well as to Shinto remains. This is aligned with many other Buddhist temples that rely on a monthly fee for housing the bones of the deceased, which are then disposed of after a set period of time. Nanzo-in has one fee, which covers 200 years.
