= Dōzen Ueno =

Japanese Buddhist priest of the Kegon school

Dōzen Ueno (上野道善, born 1939) is a Japanese Buddhist priest of the Kegon school. From 2007 to 2010, he served as the 219th head priest (bettō) at Tōdai-ji. He currently presides as senior monk and is board chairman of the board of directors at Tōdaiji Gakuen.
