= Tōdai-ji =

Buddhist temple in Nara, Japan

- 東大寺
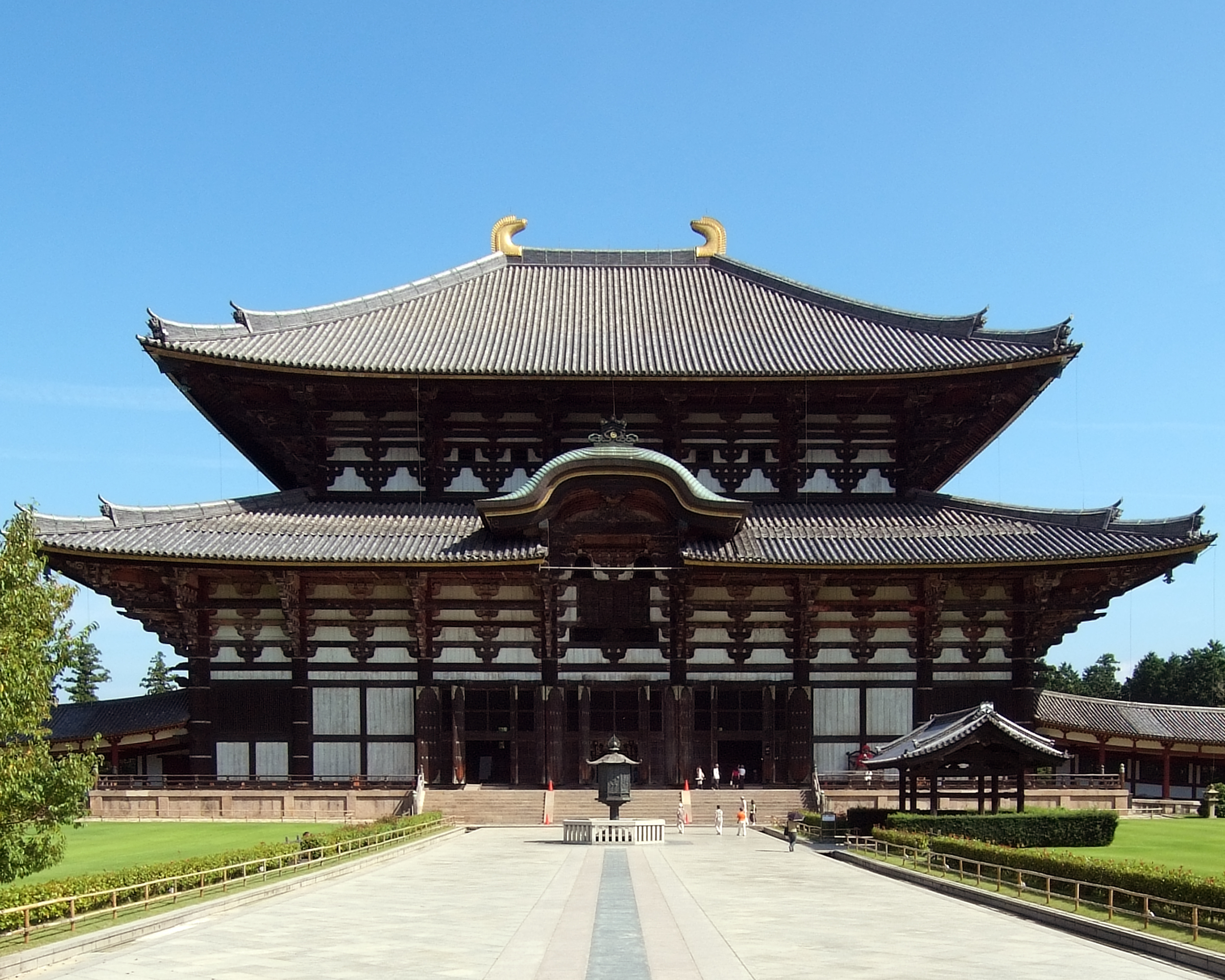
- Great Buddha Hall (daibutsuden), a National Treasure

Religion
- Affiliation: Kegon
- Deity: Birushana-butsu (Vairocana Buddha)

Location
- Location: 1 Zōshi-chō, Nara, Nara Prefecture, Japan
- Country: Japan
- Interactive map of Tōdai-ji
- Coordinates: 34°41′21″N 135°50′23″E

Architecture
- Founder: Emperor Shōmu
- Established: Early 8th century
- Completed: 1709; 317 years ago (Reconstruction)

Website
- www.todaiji.or.jp

Tōdai-ji (東大寺, 'Eastern Great Temple') is a Buddhist temple complex that was once one of the powerful Seven Great Temples, located in the city of Nara, Japan. The construction of the temple was an attempt to imitate Chinese temples from the much-admired Tang dynasty. Though it was originally founded in the year 738 CE, Tōdai-ji was not opened until the year 752 CE. The temple has undergone several reconstructions, including one initiated by Minamoto Yoritomo in 1181 (entrusted to Chogen, a monk of the Jodo sect) which included the standardization of existing buildings and the strengthening of visible pillars. Since then, one of the most significant reconstruction (that of the Great Buddha Hall) took place in 1709. However, it was on the verge of collapse in the late 19th century due to the weight of its huge roof. The collapse was prevented through a first restoration (1904–1913), and its current appearance was completed using steel framing between 1974 and 1980. Its Great Buddha Hall (大仏殿, Daibutsuden) houses the world's largest bronze statue of the Buddha Vairocana, known in Japanese as Daibutsu (大仏). The temple also serves as the Japanese headquarters of the Kegon school of Buddhism. The temple is a listed UNESCO World Heritage Site as one of the "Historic Monuments of Ancient Nara", together with seven other sites (including temples, shrines and places) in the city of Nara.

== History ==
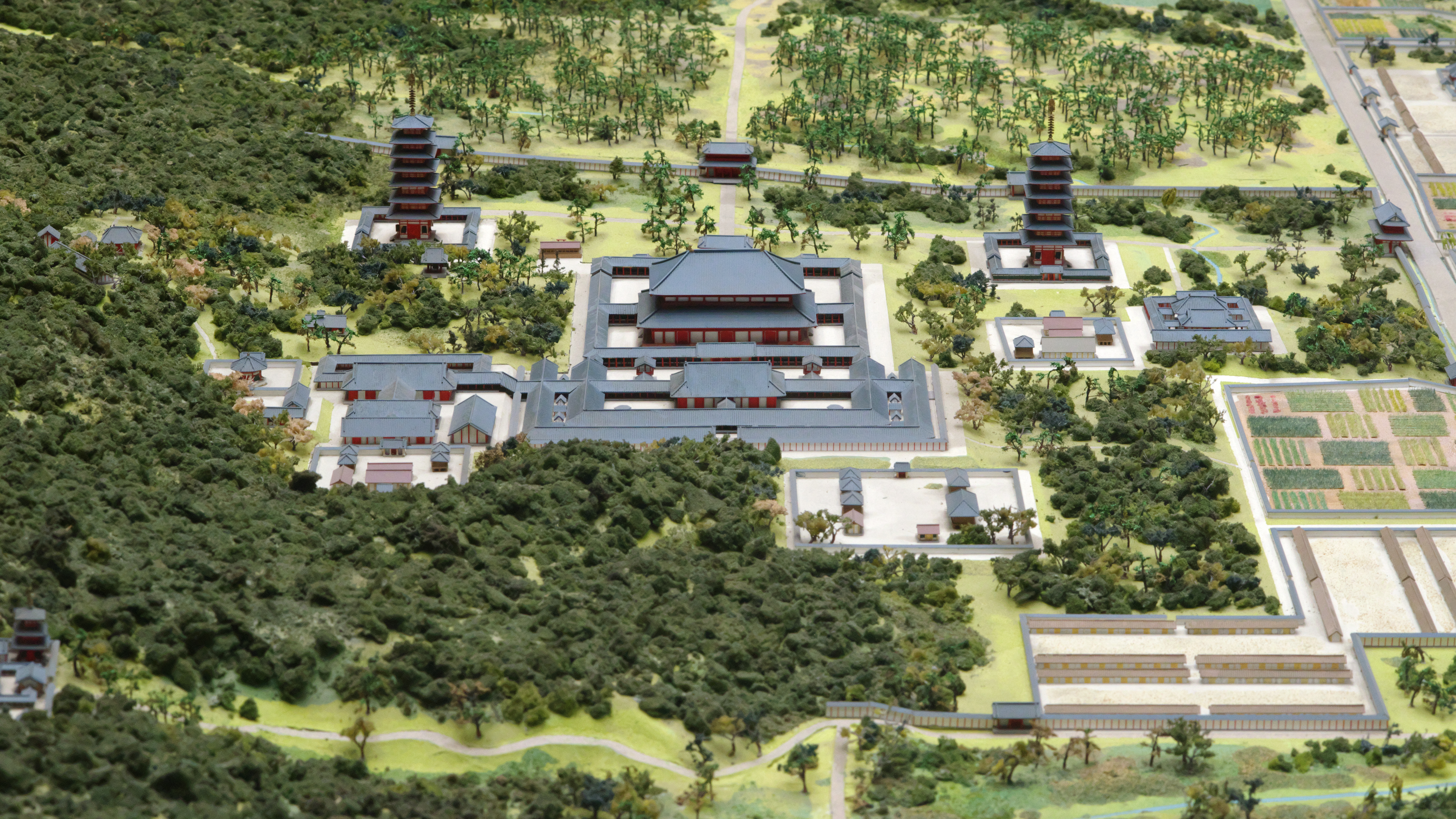
A model of the garan of Tōdai-ji at the time of its foundation, seen from the north side, a part of 1/1000 scale model of Heijōkyō held by Nara City Hall.

Map of the Tōdai-ji complex with a number of buildings that do not exist anymore, such as the two pagodas, and the library, lecture hall, refectory, and monks' quarters behind the main hall

=== Origins ===
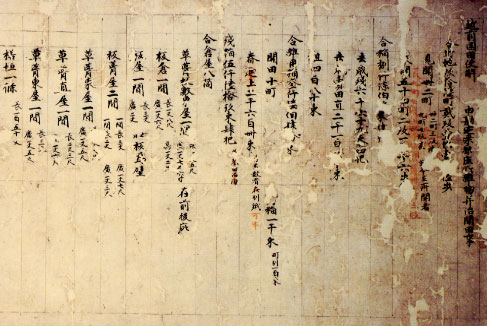
Record of temple lands in Echizen Province in 757 (ICP); as head of the national network of Provincial Temples, Tōdai-ji's privileges included a large network of tax-exempt estates

Todaiji is well known for the Nara Daibutsu, also known as "The Great Buddha of Nara," which is an image of the Buddha Birushana. The current Buddha was repaired after suffering significant damage in 1692. Under the leadership of Abbot Shunjobo Chogen (1121–1206), numerous structures at Todaiji were rebuilt in 1180 in the fashion of the Southern Song dynasty of China.

During the Tenpyō era, Japan suffered from a series of disasters and epidemics. It was after experiencing these problems that Emperor Shōmu issued an edict in 741 to promote the construction of provincial temples throughout the nation. Later in 743 during the Tenpyō era the Emperor commissioned the Daibutsu to be built in 743. Tōdai-ji (still Kinshōsen-ji at the time) was appointed as the provincial temple of Yamato Province and the head of all the provincial temples. With the alleged coup d'état by Nagaya in 729, a major outbreak of smallpox around 735–737, worsened by several consecutive years of poor crops, followed by a rebellion led by Fujiwara no Hirotsugu in 740, the country was in a chaotic situation. Emperor Shōmu had been forced to move the capital four times, indicating a certain level of instability during this period.

=== Role in early Japanese Buddhism ===
Tōdai-ji
- "Tōdai-ji" in kanji

Japanese name
- Kanji: 東大寺
Transcriptions
- Romanization: Tōdai-ji

According to legend, the monk Gyōki went to Ise Grand Shrine to reconcile Shinto with Buddhism. He spent seven days and nights reciting sutras until the oracle declared Vairocana Buddha compatible with worship of the sun goddess Amaterasu.

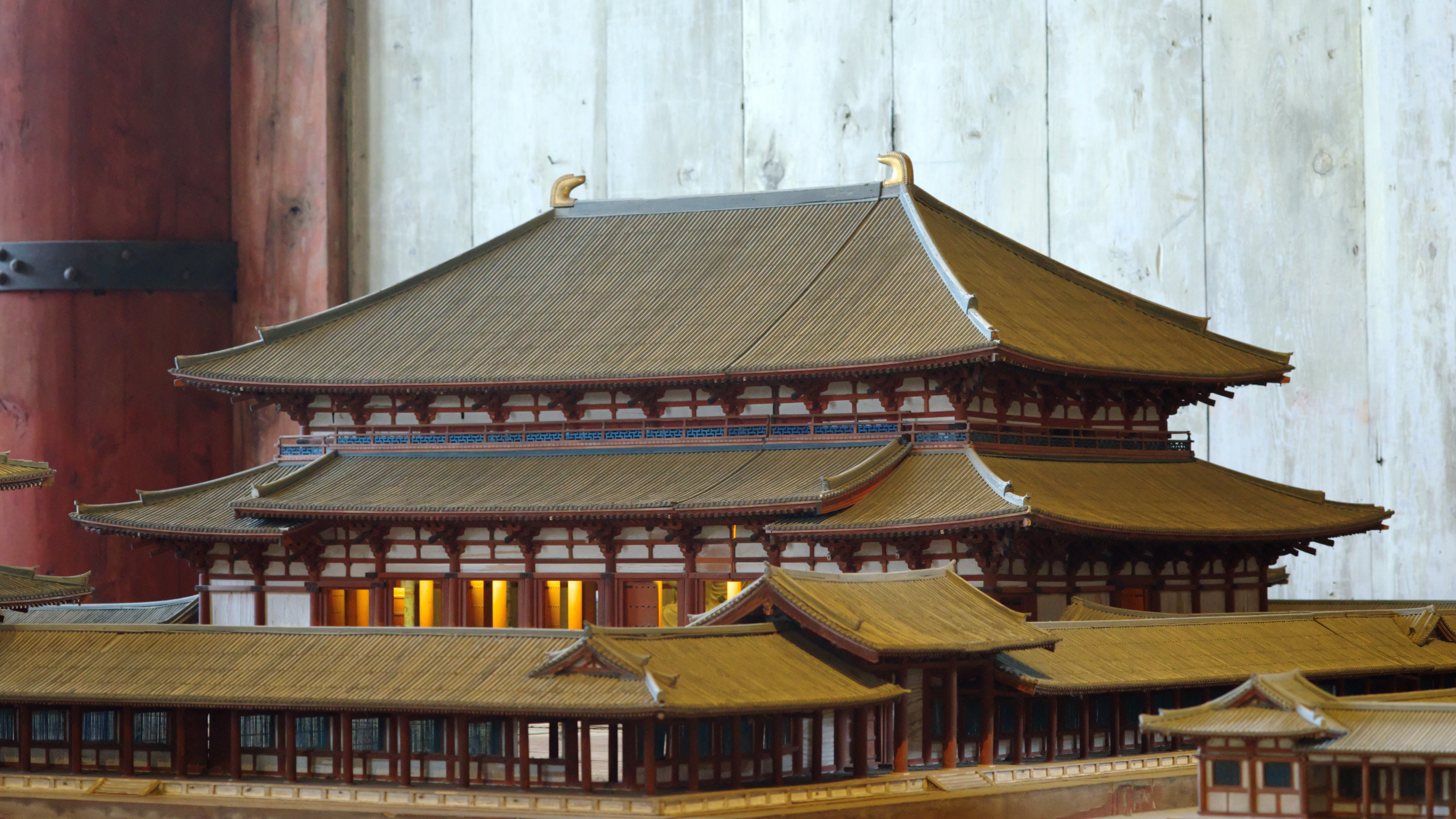
A Model of the Kondo (Great Buddha Hall) at the time of foundation. The original hall was larger than the one built after it.

Under the Ritsuryō system of government in the Nara period, Buddhism was heavily regulated by the state through the Sōgō (僧綱; Office of Priestly Affairs). During this time, Tōdai-ji served as the central administrative temple for the provincial temples and for the six Buddhist schools in Japan at the time: the Hossō, Kegon, Jōjitsu, Sanron, Ritsu and Kusha. Letters dating from this time also show that all six Buddhist schools had offices at Tōdai-ji, complete with administrators, shrines and their own library.

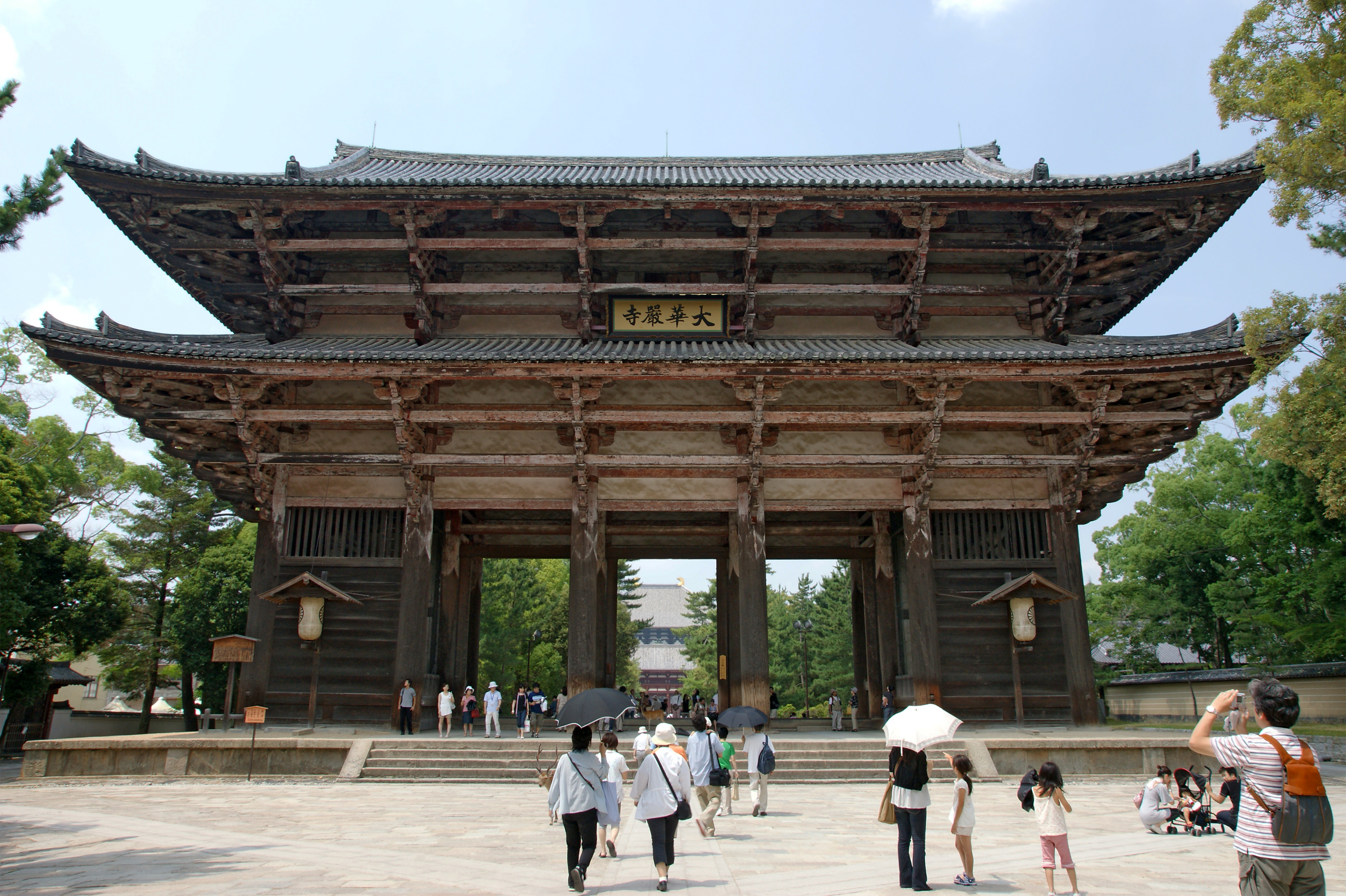
The Great South Gate (nandaimon), a National Treasure (13th century)

Japanese Buddhism during this time still maintained the lineage of the Vinaya and all officially licensed monks were required to take their ordination under the Vinaya at Tōdai-ji. In 754 CE, ordination was given by Ganjin, who arrived in Japan after traveling over 12 years and six attempts of crossing the sea from China, to Empress Kōken, former Emperor Shōmu and others. Later Buddhist monks, including Kūkai and Saichō received their ordination here as well. During Kūkai's administration of the Sōgō, additional ordination ceremonies were added to Tōdai-ji, including the ordination of the Bodhisattva Precepts from the Brahma Net Sutra and the esoteric Precepts, or Samaya, from Kukai's own newly established Shingon school of Buddhism. Kūkai added an Abhiseka Hall to use for initiating monks of the six Nara schools into the esoteric teachings by 829 CE.

=== Decline ===
As the center of power in Japanese Buddhism shifted away from Nara to Mount Hiei and the Tendai sect, and when the centre of political power in Japan moved from the emperor's capital to the shōgun's base in Kamakura in the aftermath of the Genpei war, Tōdai-ji's role in maintaining authority declined. In later generations, the Vinaya lineage also died out, despite repeated attempts to revive it; thus no more ordination ceremonies take place at Tōdai-ji.

== Architecture ==
=== Initial construction ===
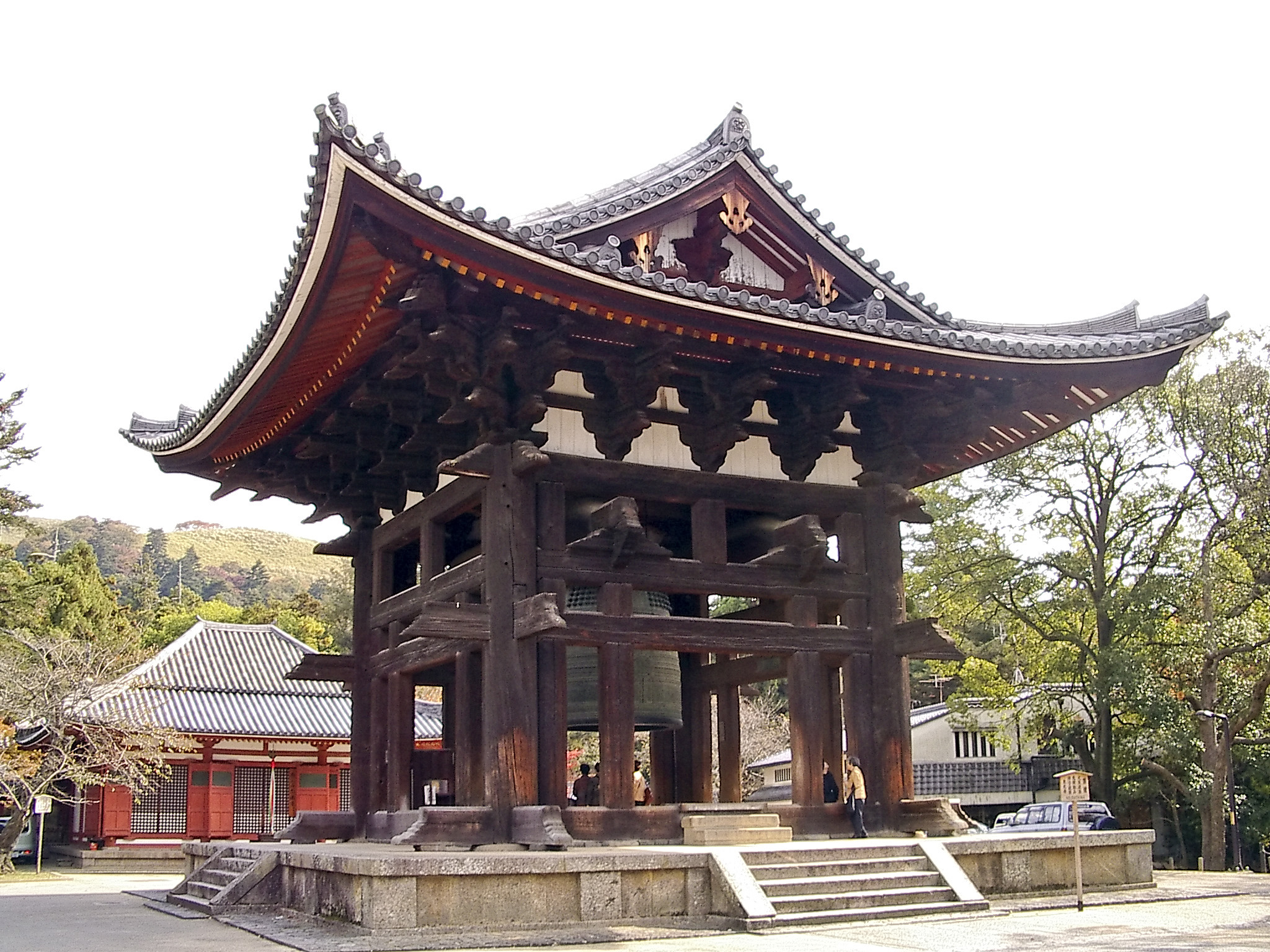
The belfry at Tōdai-ji

In 743, Emperor Shōmu issued a law stating that the people should become directly involved with the establishment of new Buddhist temples throughout Japan. The Emperor believed that such piety would inspire Buddha to protect his country from further disaster. Gyōki, with his pupils, traveled the provinces asking for donations. According to records kept by Tōdai-ji, more than 2,600,000 people in total helped construct the Great Buddha and its Hall, contributing rice, wood, metal, cloth, or labour, with 350,000 working directly on the statue's construction. The 16 m (52 ft) high statue was built through eight castings over three years, the head and neck being cast together as a separate element. The making of the statue was started first in Shigaraki. After enduring multiple fires and earthquakes, the construction was eventually resumed in Nara in 745, and the Buddha was finally completed in 751. A year later, in 752, the eye-opening ceremony was held with an attendance of 10,000 monks and 4,000 dancers to celebrate the completion of the Buddha. The Indian priest Bodhisena performed the eye-opening for Emperor Shōmu. The project cost Japan greatly, as the statue used much of Japan's bronze and relied entirely on imported gold. 48 lacquered cinnabar pillars, 1.5 m (4.9 ft) in diameter and 30 m (98 ft) long, support the blue tiled roof of the Daibutsu-den.

Maps that include some of the original structures of Tōdai-ji are rare, though some still exist today. Some of these structures include, the two pagodas, the library, lecture hall, refectory, and the monk's quarters located behind the main hall. Tōdai-ji functioned not only as a place of worship and Buddhist practice, but as a place of higher learning and study. Much of what contemporaries now know about the original layout of the temple comes from the writings of monks who lived and studied there.

The original complex contained two 100 m (330 ft) pagodas, making them some of the tallest structures at the time. They were located on either side of the complex, one on the western (西塔) and one on the eastern side (東塔). The pagodas themselves were surrounded by a walled courtyard with four gates. These were destroyed by an earthquake. One of the sōrin finials was reproduced for the 1970 Osaka Expo and is standing at the spot where one of the pagodas used to stand.

The Shōsōin was its storehouse, and now contains many artifacts from the Tenpyō period of Japanese history.

=== Reconstructions post-Nara Period ===
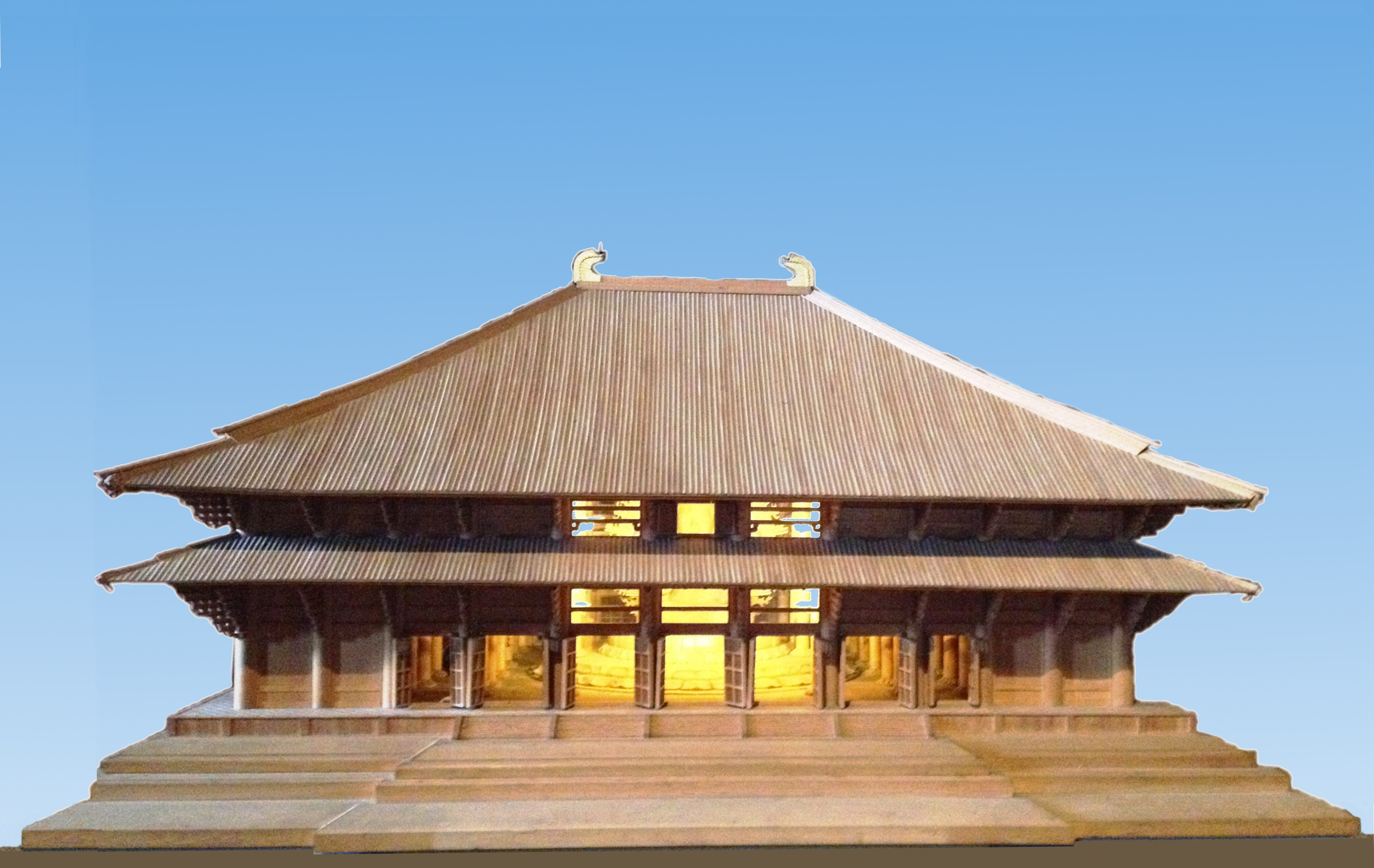
A model of the Kondo that was rebuilt in the Kamakura period

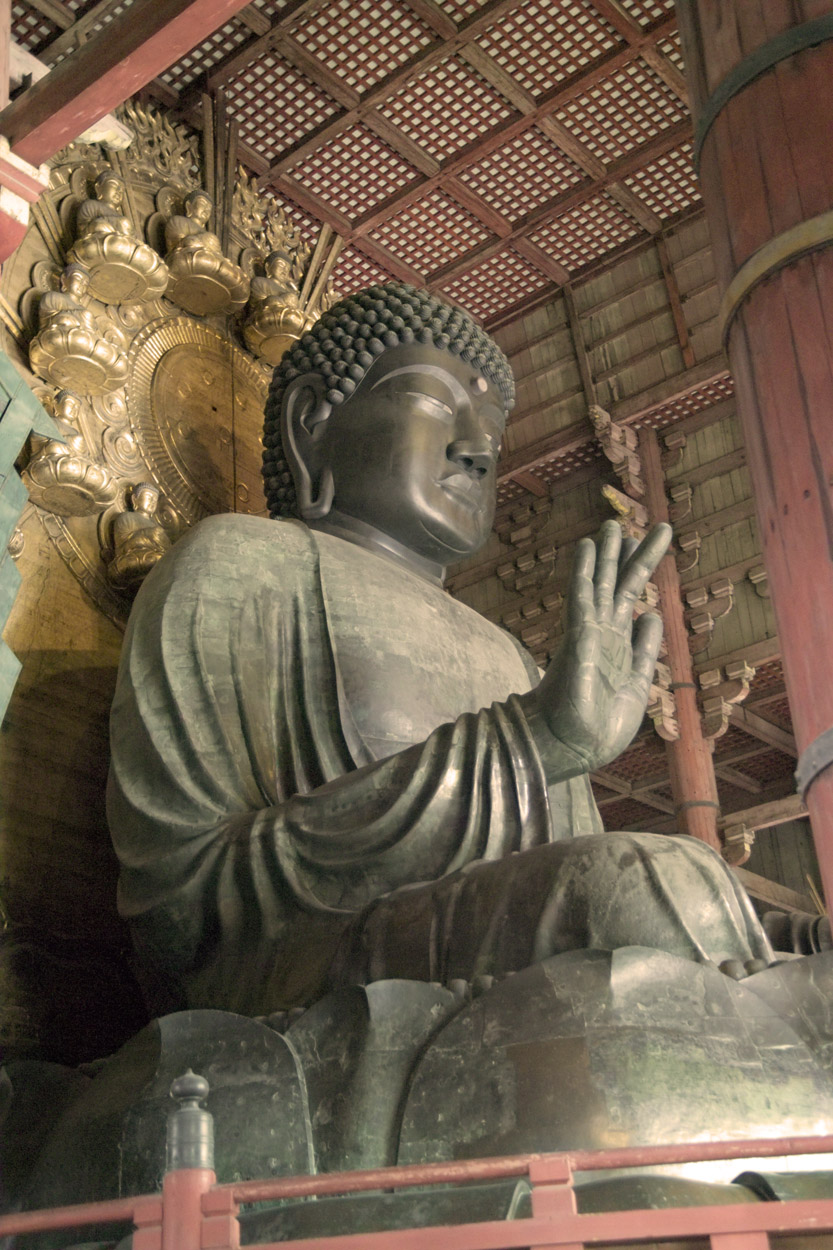
The Great Buddha (Daibutsu) in the main hall

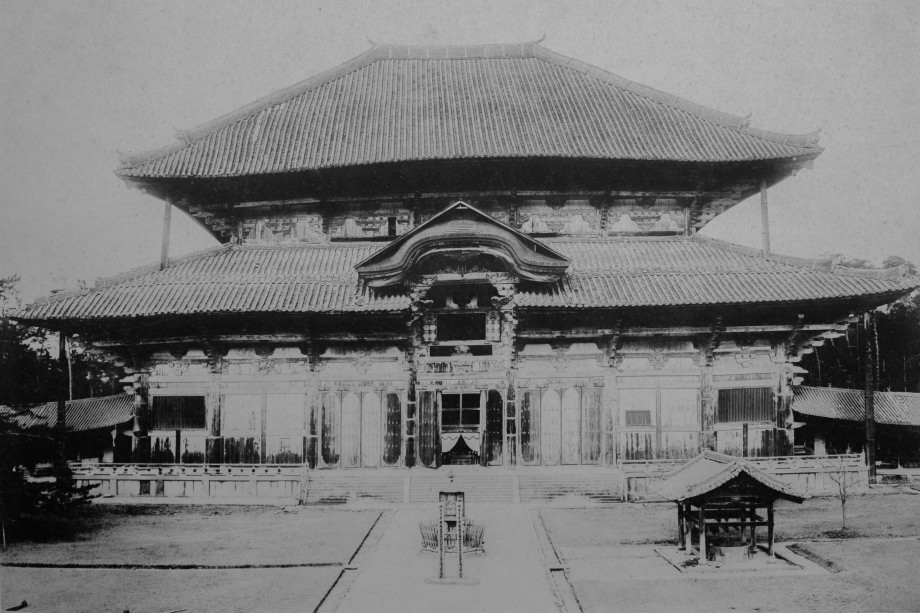
Todaiji in 1915 after the first restoration

The Great Buddha Hall (Daibutsuden) has been rebuilt twice after fire. The current building was finished in 1709, and although immense—57 metres (187 ft) long, 50 metres (160 ft) wide and 49 metres (161 ft) high—it is actually 30% smaller than its predecessor, being reduced from 11 to 7 bays wide due to lack of funds. Until 1998, it was the world's largest wooden building. It has been surpassed by modern structures, such as the Japanese baseball stadium Odate Jukai Dome, amongst others. The Great Buddha statue has been recast several times for various reasons, including earthquake damage. The current hands of the statue were made in the Momoyama Period (1568–1615), and the head was made in the Edo period (1615–1867).

The existing Nandaimon (Great South Gate) was constructed at the end of the 12th century based on Daibutsuyō style, after the original gate was destroyed by a typhoon during the Heian period. The dancing figures of the Nio, the two 8.5-metre-tall (28 ft) guardians at the Nandaimon, were built around the same time by the artists Unkei, Kaikei, and their workshop staff. The Nio are an A-un pair known as Ungyo, which by tradition has a facial expression with a closed mouth, and Agyo, which has an open mouthed expression. The two figures were closely evaluated and extensively restored by a team of art conservators between 1988 and 1993. Until then, these sculptures had never before been moved from the niches in which they were originally installed. This complex preservation project, costing $4.7 million, involved a restoration team of 15 experts from the National Treasure Repairing Institute in Kyoto.

By the 19th century, the Great Buddha Hall had become seriously deteriorated, and its roof and pillars had warped. By the Meiji period it was at risk of collapse.

However, Japan, which was Westernizing, was influenced by the West and developed the concept of protecting cultural properties, and the first large-scale restoration project was carried out from 1904 to 1913. However, even then, the warped roof could not be completely repaired, so instead, support beams were erected to prevent collapse. After that, it escaped the US air raids during World War II and was safe, and in 1974, the second large-scale construction project began.

At this time, a new change occurred in the wooden structure of the Great Buddha Hall. A total of 100,000 people were mobilized for the construction. During this time, the roof was completely removed and fixed using steel frames, and the wooden pillars of the Great Buddha Hall were remodeled using steel frames and concrete. This construction was completed in 1980, This second large scale construction project resulted in the Great Buddha Hall having its current appearance.

=== Dimensions of the Daibutsu ===
The temple gives the following dimensions for the statue:

- Height: 14.98 m (49 ft 2 in)
- Face: 5.33 m (17 ft 6 in)
- Eyes: 1.02 m (3 ft 4 in)
- Nose: 0.5 m (1 ft 8 in)
- Ears: 2.54 m (8 ft 4 in)

The statue's shoulders are 28 meters (92 ft) across and there are 960 six curls atop its head. The Birushana Buddha's golden halo is 27 m (87 ft) in diameter with 16 images each 2.4 m (8 ft) tall.

Using x-rays, a human tooth, along with pearls, mirrors, swords, and jewels have been discovered inside the knee of the Great Buddha; these are believed to be the relics of Emperor Shomu.

The statue weighs 500 tonnes (550 short tons).

== Temple precincts and gardens ==
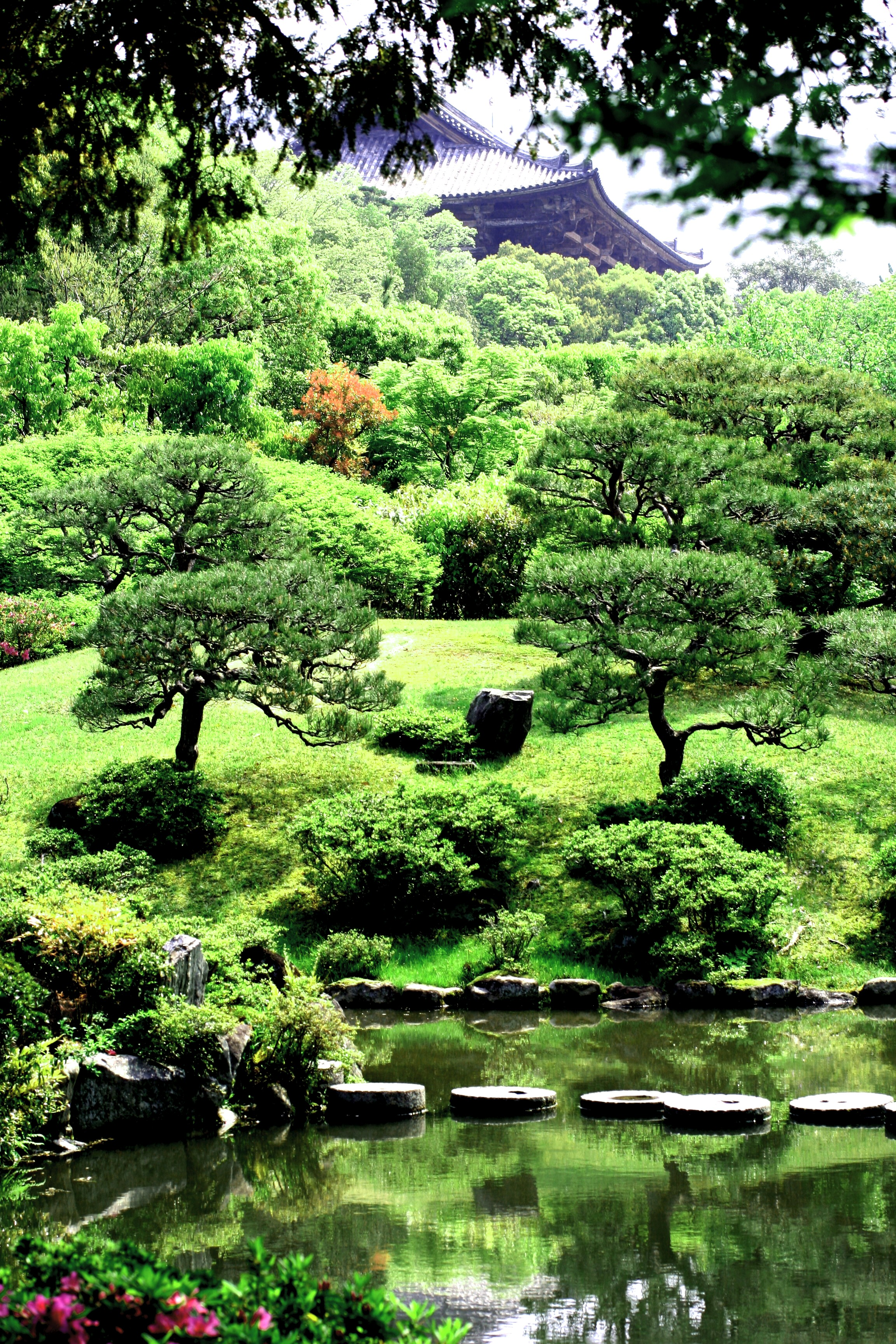
South Gate utilized in Isuien Garden.

Various buildings of the Tōdai-ji have been incorporated within the overall aesthetic intention of the gardens' design. Adjacent villas are today considered part of Tōdai-ji. Some of these structures are now open to the public.

Over the centuries, the buildings and gardens have evolved together as to become an integral part of an organic and living temple community.

The Tōdai-ji Culture Center opened on October 10, 2011, comprising a museum to exhibit the many sculptures and other treasures enshrined in the various temple halls, along with a library and research centre, storage facility, and auditorium.

== Japanese national treasures ==
The architectural master-works are classified as:

National treasures
Romaji	Kanji
Kon-dō (Daibutsuden)	金堂 (大仏殿)
Nandaimon	南大門
Kaizan-dō	開山堂
Shōrō	鐘楼
Hokke-dō (Sangatsu-dō)	法華堂 (三月堂)
Nigatsu-dō	二月堂
Tegaimon	転害門

== Major historical events ==
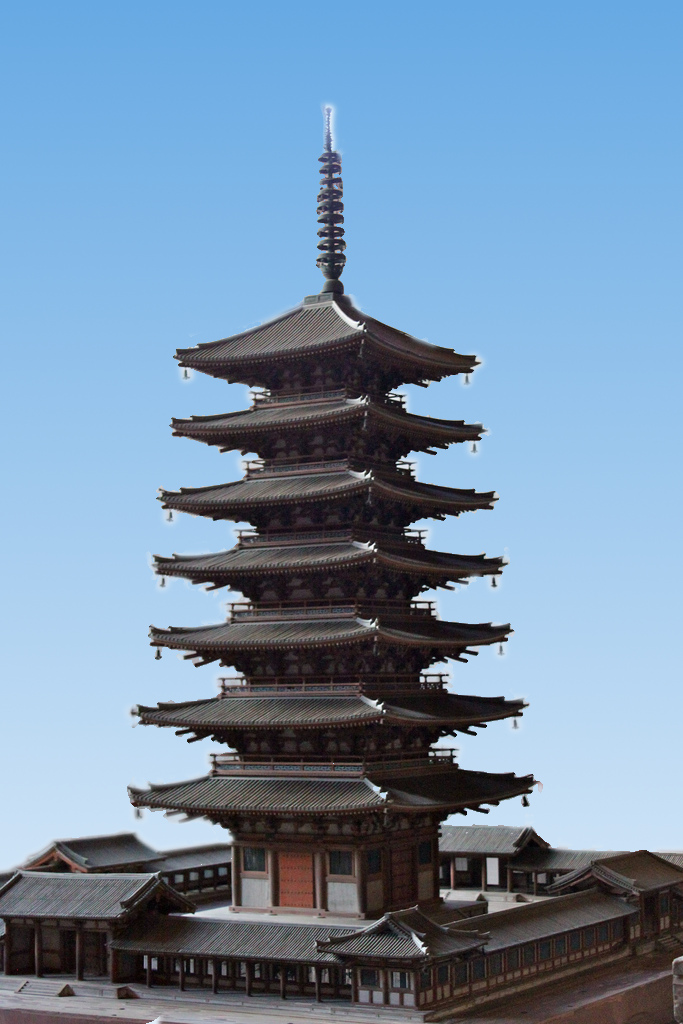
The temple originally had two large pagodas on either side of the complex, which used to be among the tallest structures of its time.

- 728: Kinshōsen-ji, the forerunner of Tōdai-ji, is established as a gesture of appeasement for the troubled spirit of Prince Motoi.
- 741: Emperor Shōmu calls for nationwide establishment of provincial temples, and Kinshōsen-ji appointed as the head provincial temple of Yamato.
- 743: The Emperor commands that a very large Buddha image statue shall be built—the Daibutsu or Great Buddha—and initial work is begun at Shigaraki-no-miya.
- 745: The capital returns to Heijō-kyō, construction of the Great Buddha resumes in Nara. Usage of the name Tōdai-ji appears on record.
- 752: The Eye-opening Ceremony celebrating the completion of the Great Buddha held.
- 855: The head of the great statue of the Buddha Vairocana suddenly fell to the ground; and gifts from the pious throughout the empire were collected to create another, more well-seated head for the restored Daibutsu.

== In popular culture ==
Matsuo Bashō refers to the Great Buddha statue in a haiku (1689–1670):

初雪や
いつ大仏
の柱立

Hatsuyuki ya
Itsu daibutsu
No hashiradate

"First snow!
When Buddha's great statue
pillar-erection"

and,

"First snow and
there stands the great Buddha
a pillar of strength"

Tōdai-ji has been used as a location in several Japanese films and television dramas. It was also used in the 1950s John Wayne movie The Barbarian and the Geisha when Nandaimon, the Great South Gate, doubled as a city's gates.

On May 20, 1994, the international music festival The Great Music Experience was held at Tōdai-ji, supported by UNESCO. Performers included the Tokyo New Philharmonic Orchestra, X Japan, INXS, Jon Bon Jovi, Joni Mitchell, Bob Dylan, Tomoyasu Hotei, Roger Taylor, classic Japanese drummers, and a Buddhist monk choir. This event, organized by British producer Tony Hollingsworth, was simultaneously broadcast in 55 countries on May 22 and 23, 1994.

The 2007 animation series Mononoke (モノノ怪), which is a spin-off of the 2006 horror anthology series Ayakashi: Samurai Horror Tales, references the Tōdai-ji, particularly the treasure room Shōsōin, in Episodes 8 and 9.

The Tōdai-ji is used as the Japanese wonder in Age of Empires II.

The Tōdai-ji is the subject of the 2003 novella "A Mountain to the North, A Lake to the South, Paths to the West, A River to the East" ("Északról hegy, Délről tó, Nyugatról utak, Keletről folyó") by László Krasznahorkai.

== International outreach ==
Following the Notre-Dame de Paris fire in April 2019, Japanese authorities declared plans to expand fire prevention measures at several historic locations, including Tōdai-ji in Nara, partly by hiring new, younger employees in a context where temple and shrine staff are aging. Custodians of Todaiji temple also installed a donation box, stating "Let's Rebuild Notre Dame Cathedral", in the hallway behind the Great Buddha statue. In June 2019, a sign next to the box, in Japanese and English, explained why Tōdai-ji, as headquarters of the Kegon sect of Buddhism, was soliciting funds in this way. The English version declared, "Todai-ji temple has been reconstructed every time it burned down by big fires thanks to the significant effort of many people. We sincerely express our deepest sympathy for the tragedy that hit the Notre-Dame de Paris. Going beyond the creed, we would like to ask everyone for your support to reconstruct the cathedral."

== Gallery ==
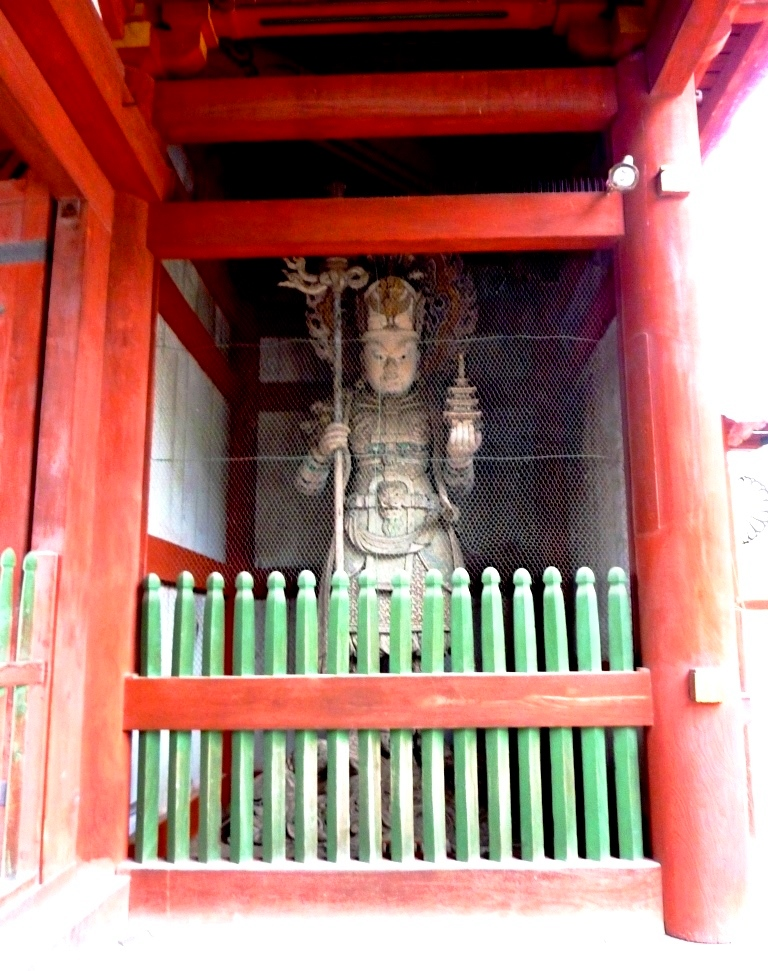
Guardian figure, Tōdai-ji.

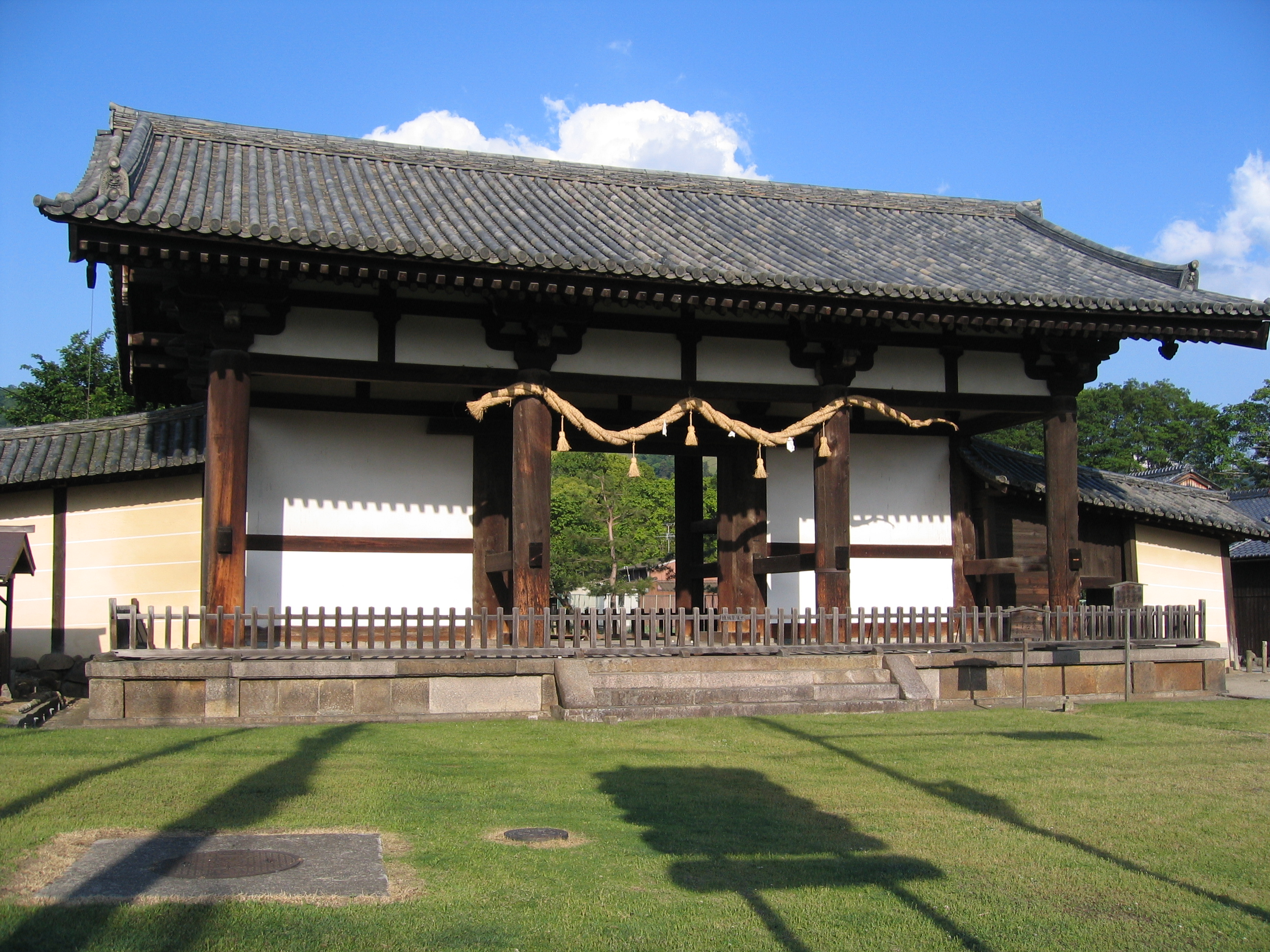
The Tengai-mon is also a National Treasure (8th century).

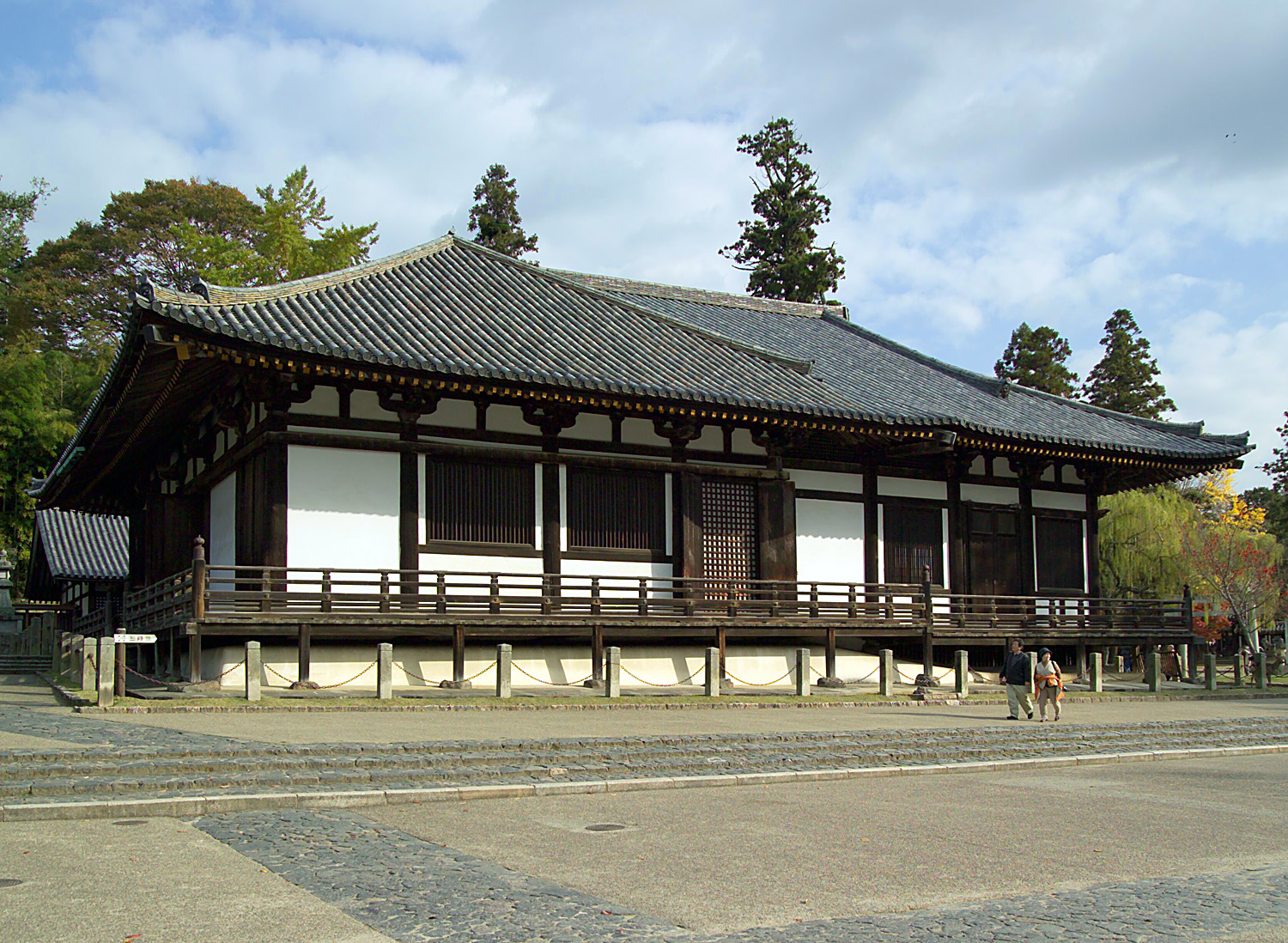
Hokke-dō is also a National Treasure (8th century).

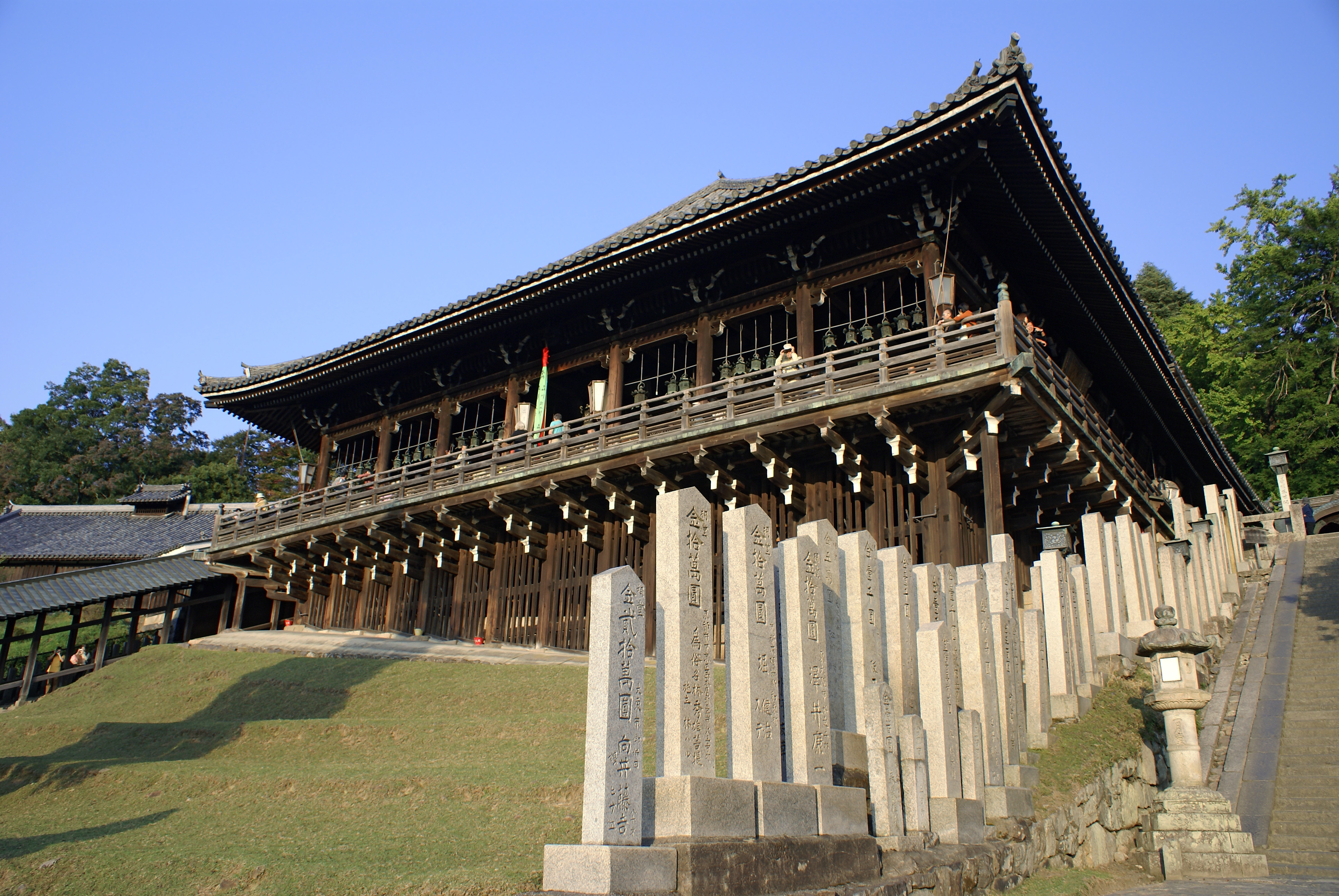
Nigatsu-dō is also a National Treasure (17th century).

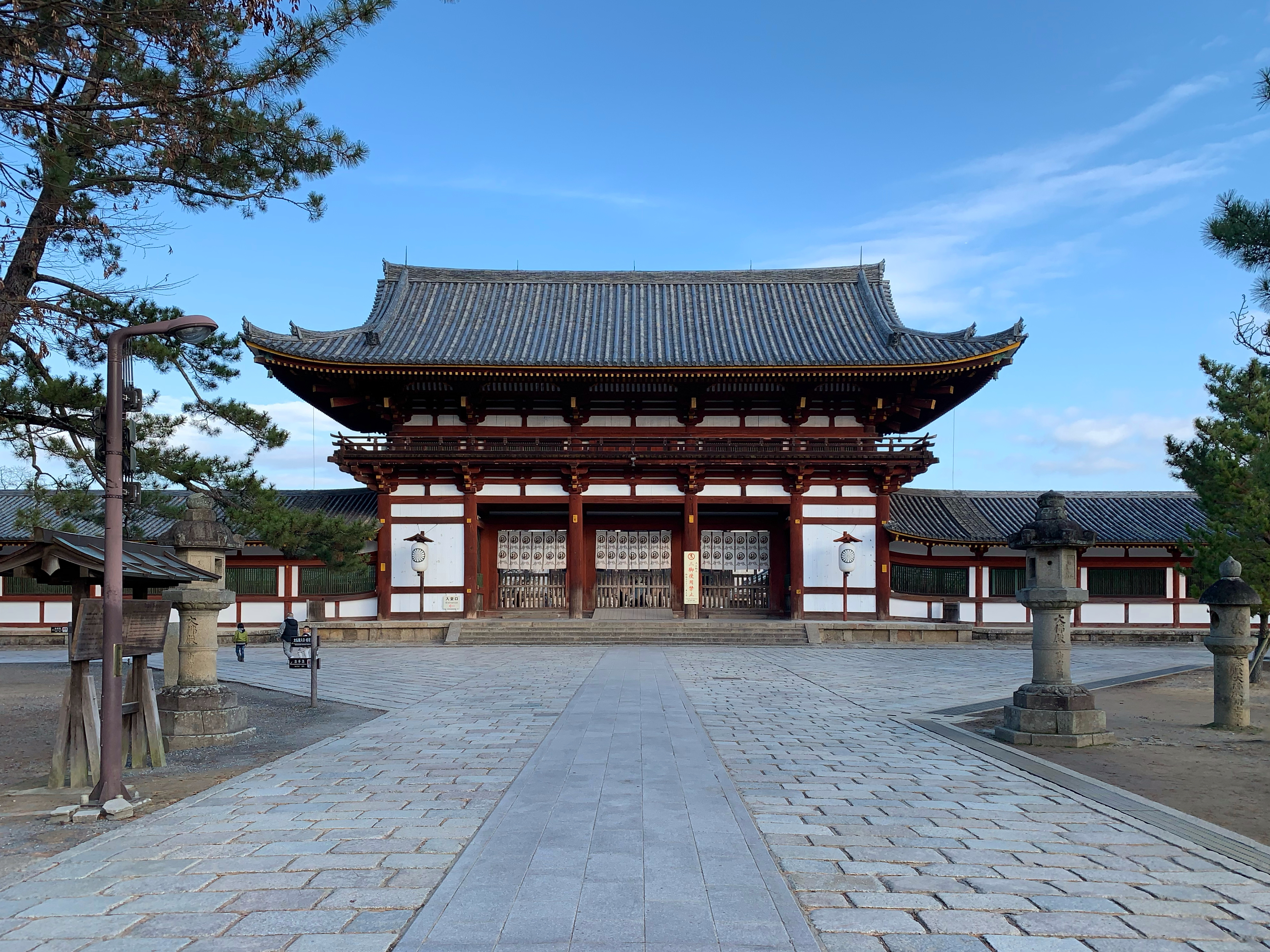
Chūmon Gate

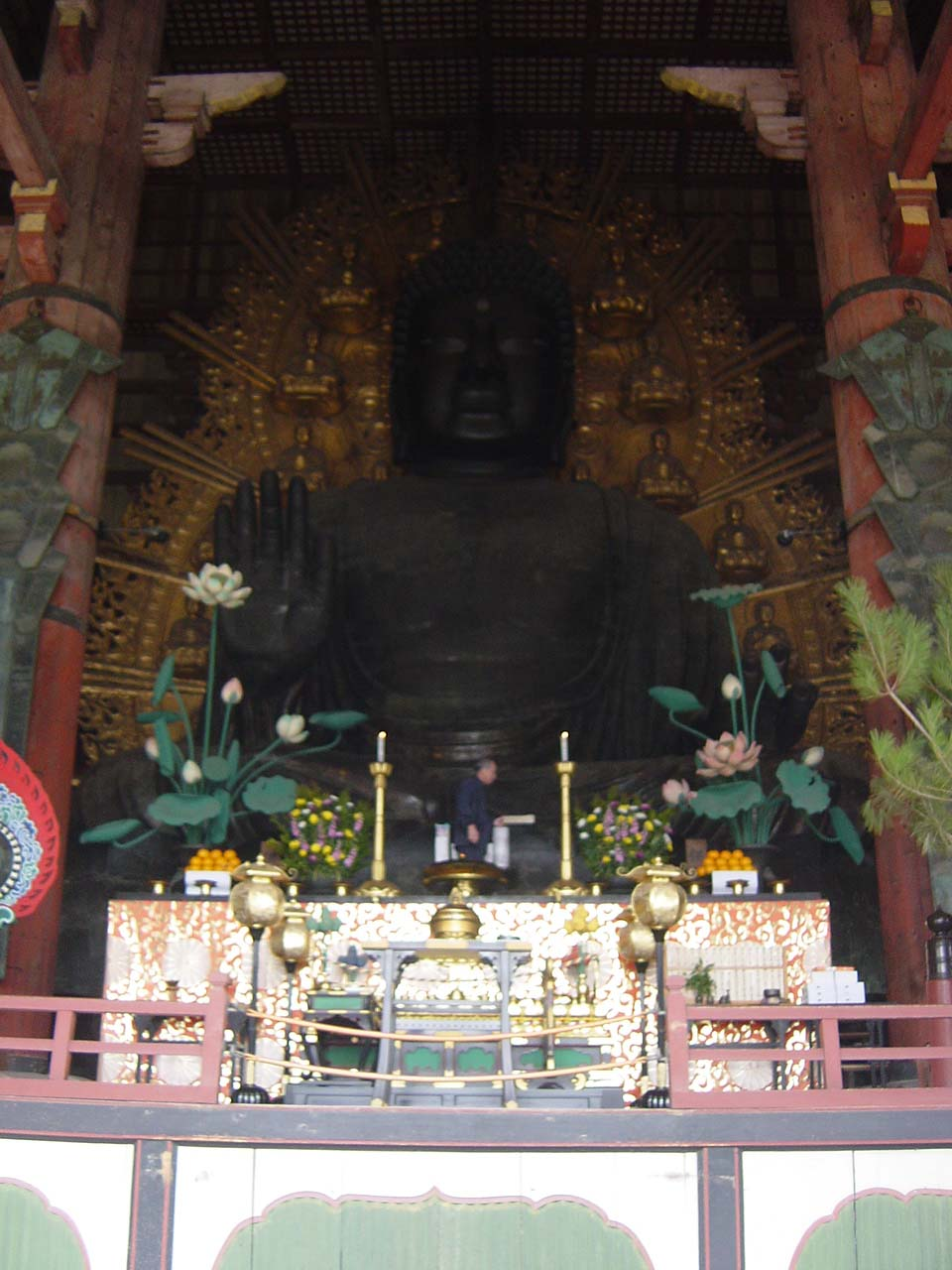
Daibutsu; Note caretaker standing at base for scale.

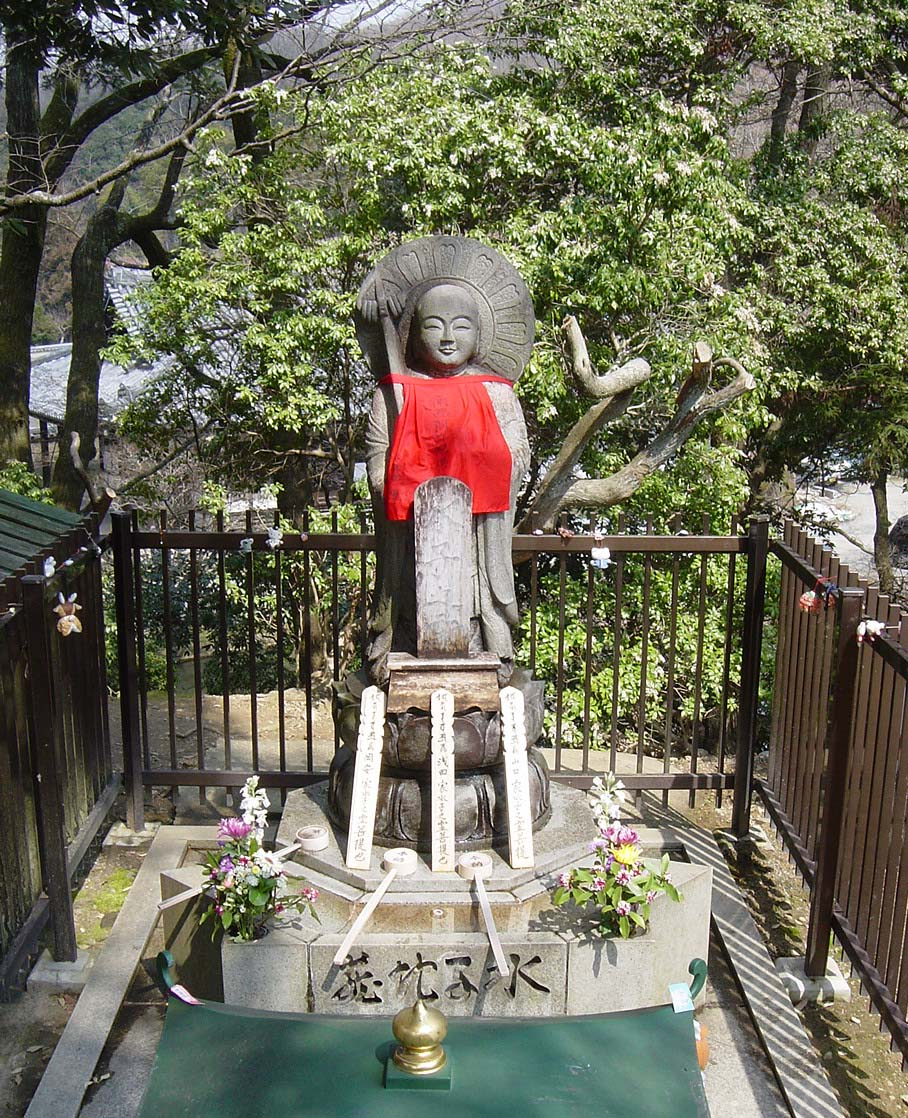
Stone Jizō from grounds of Tōdai-ji.

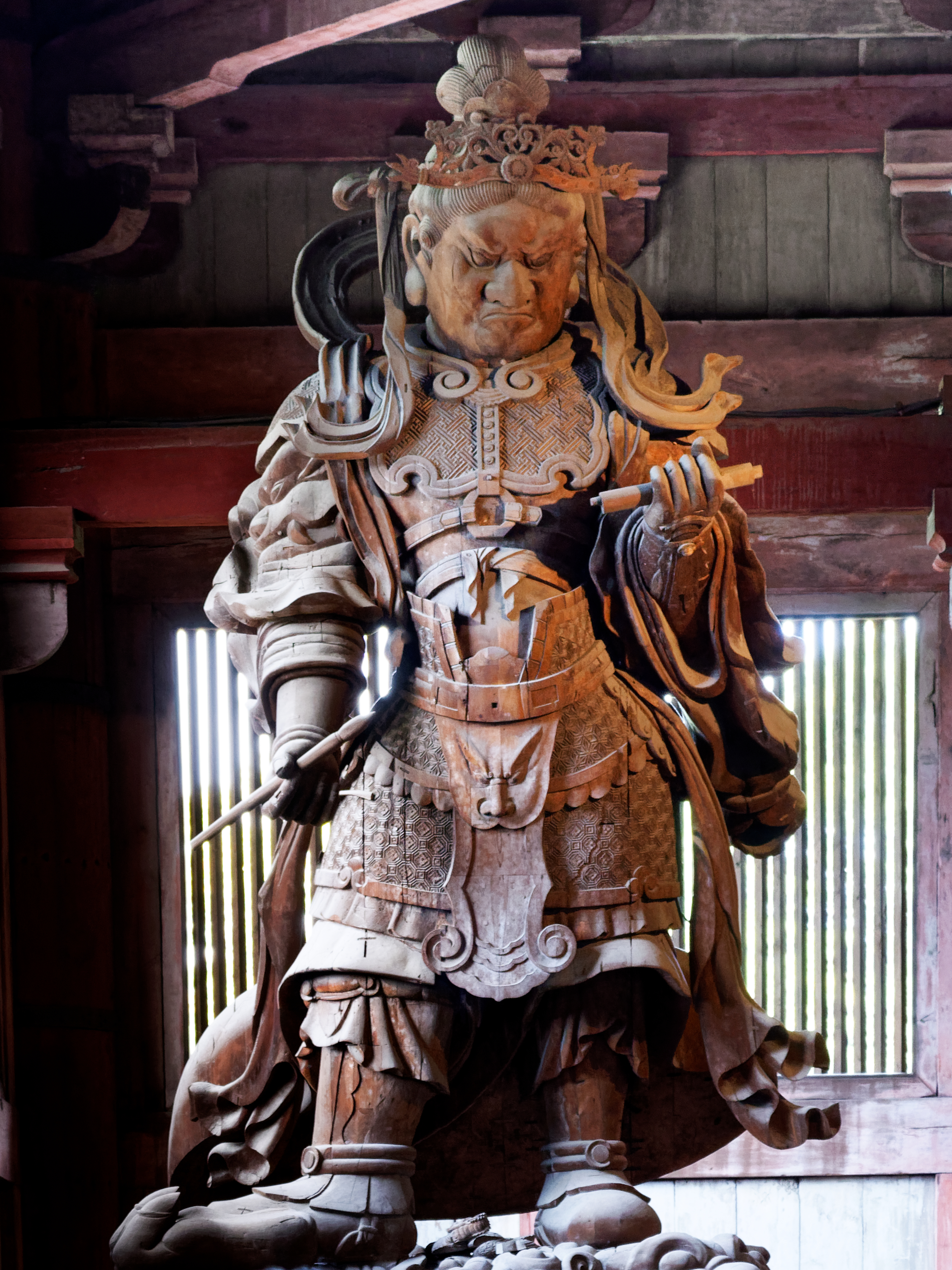
Komokuten, one of the pair of guardians in the Daibutsuden

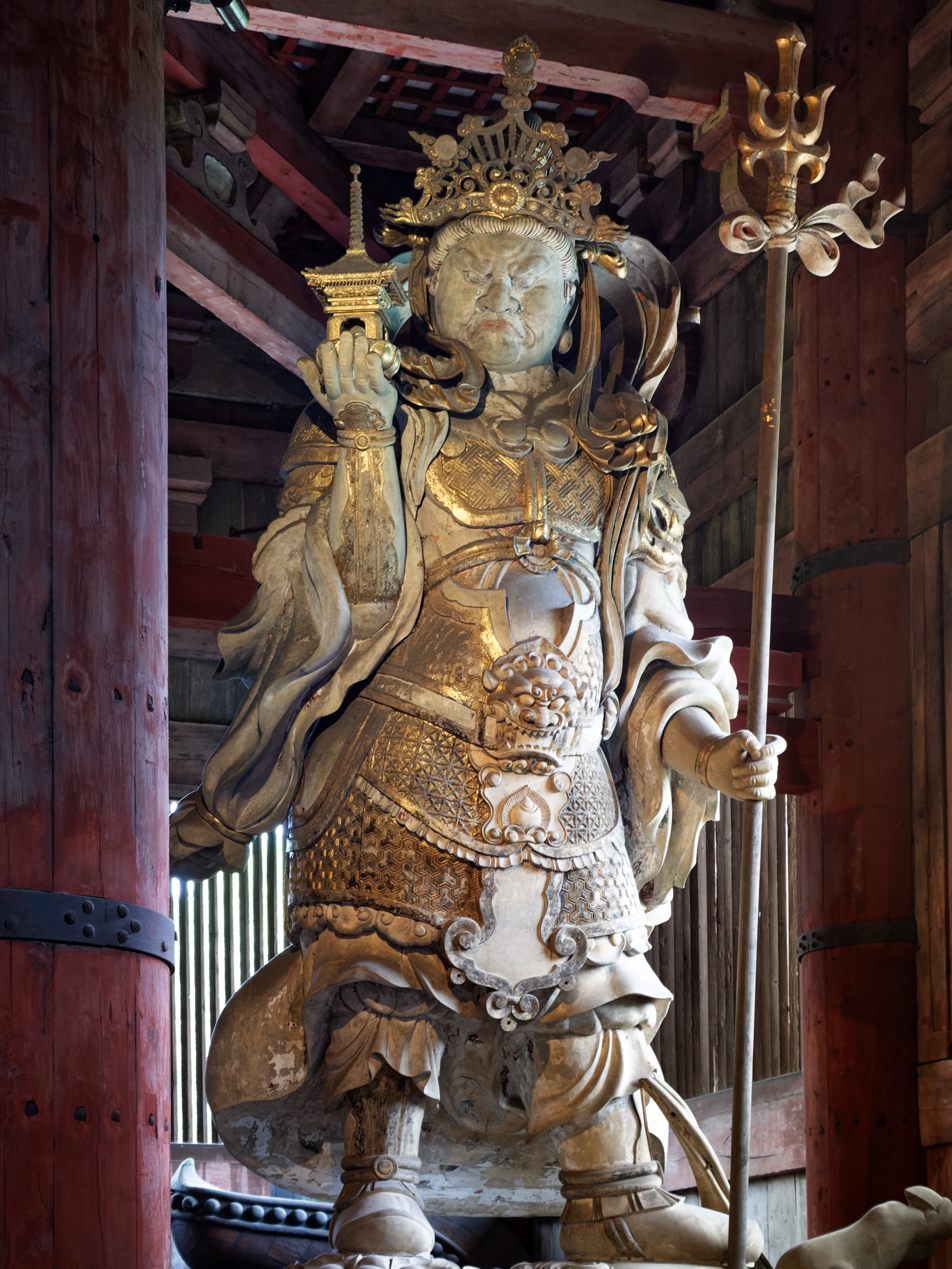
Bishamonten watching over Tōdai-ji and its precincts.

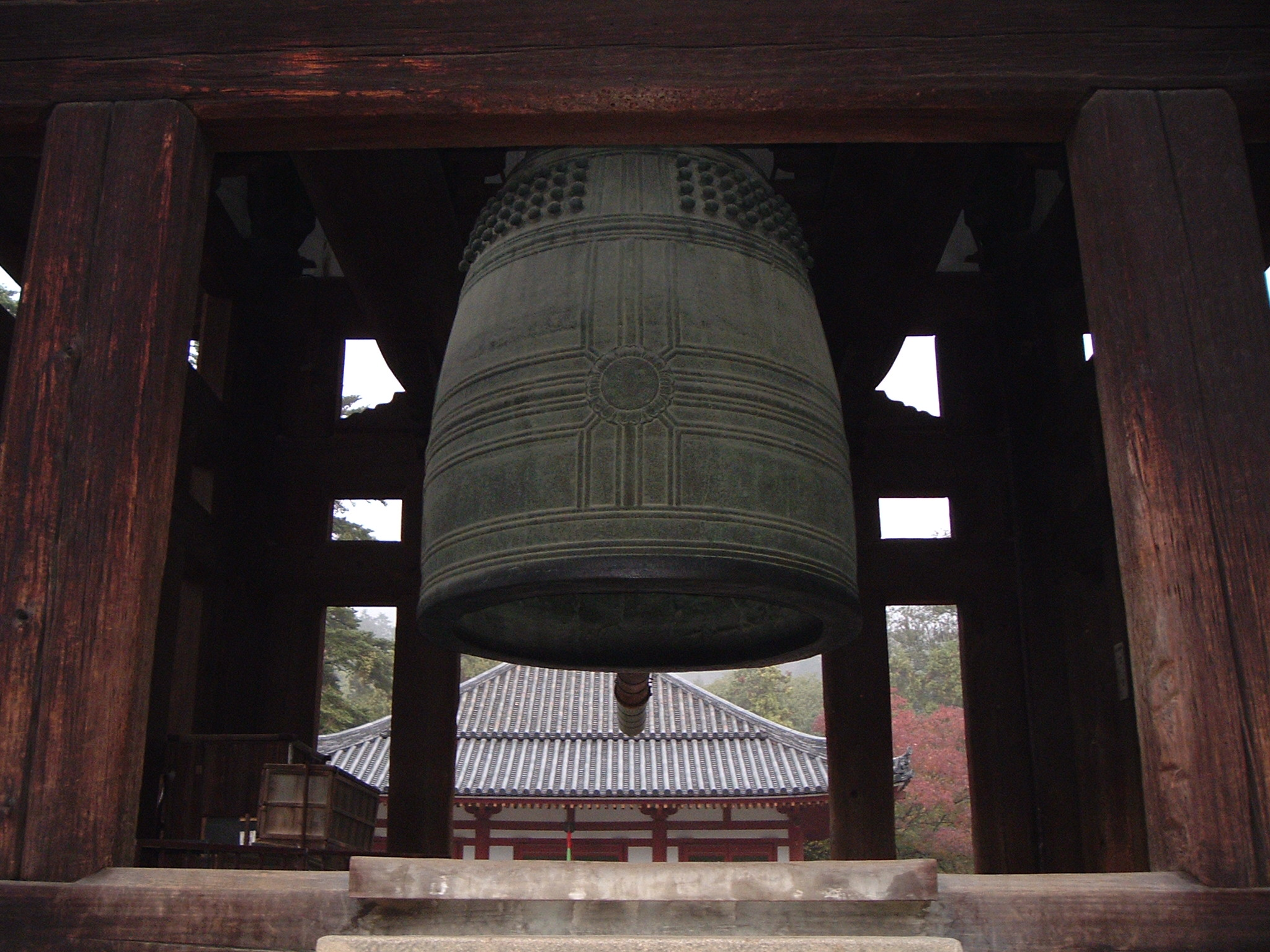
Bronze bell

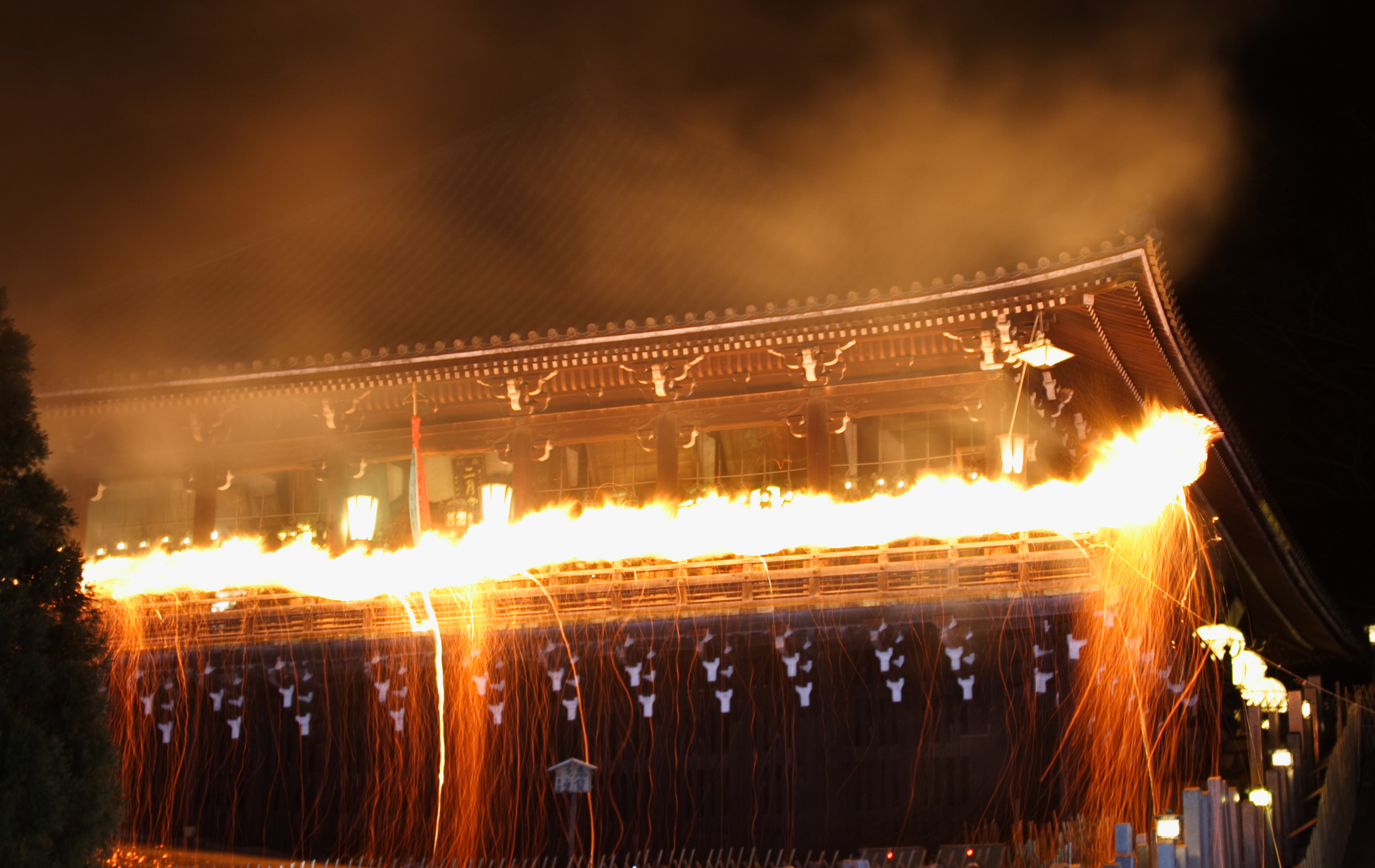
Shuni-e held March 1 to 14 in Nigatsu-dō.

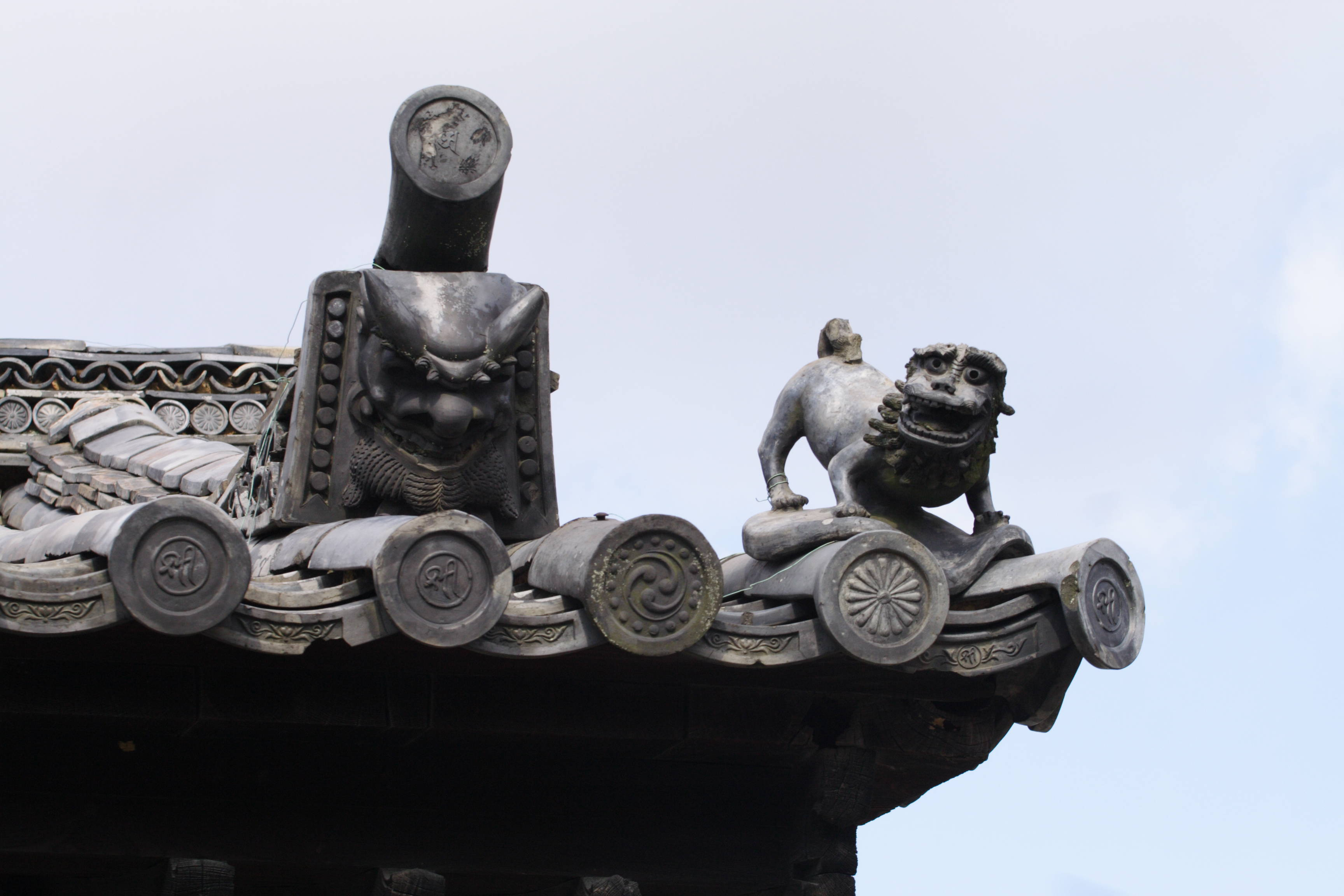
Onigawara roof tiles

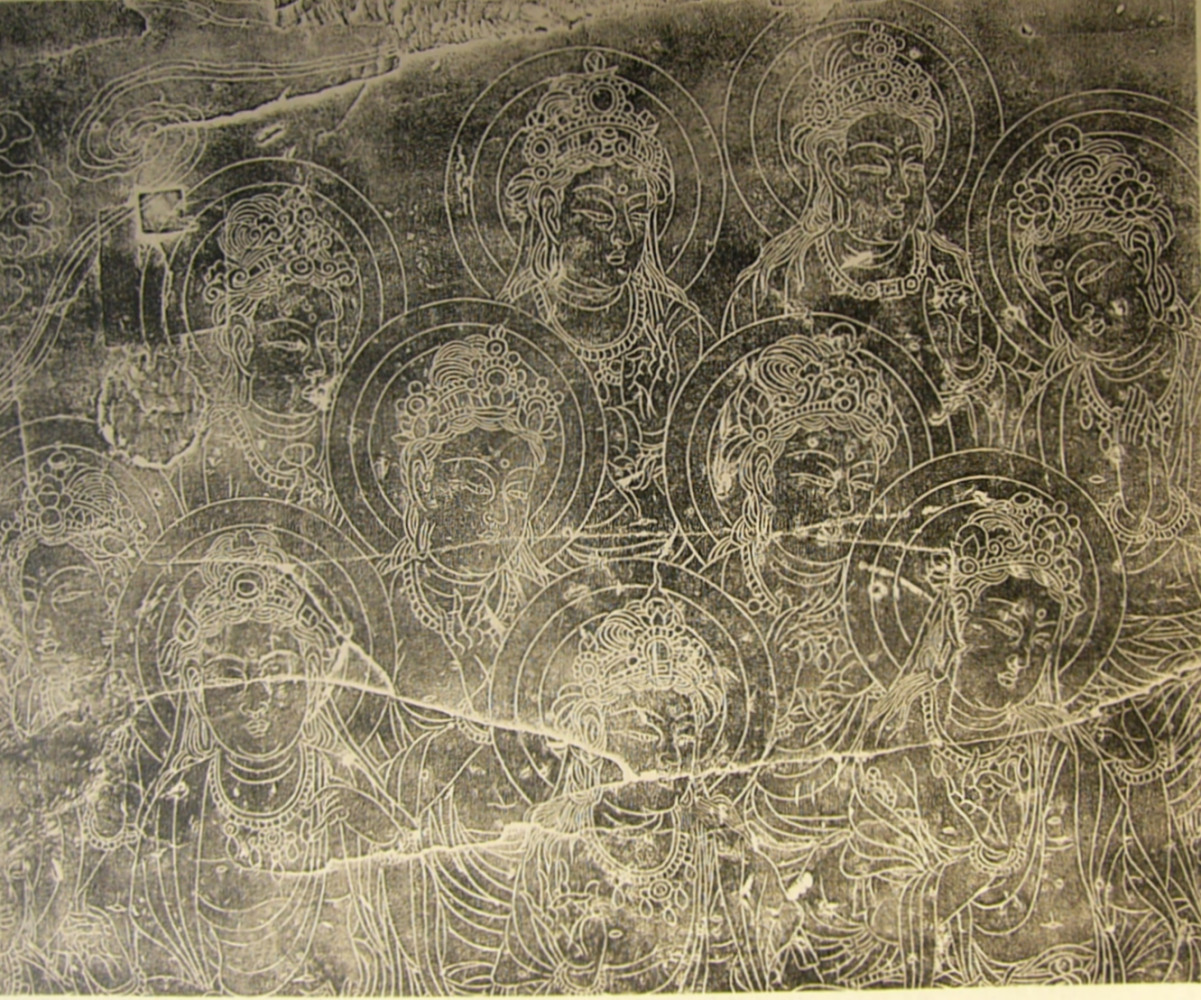
Bodhisattvas incised on Lotus Petal of the throne of the main Buddha, 8th century.

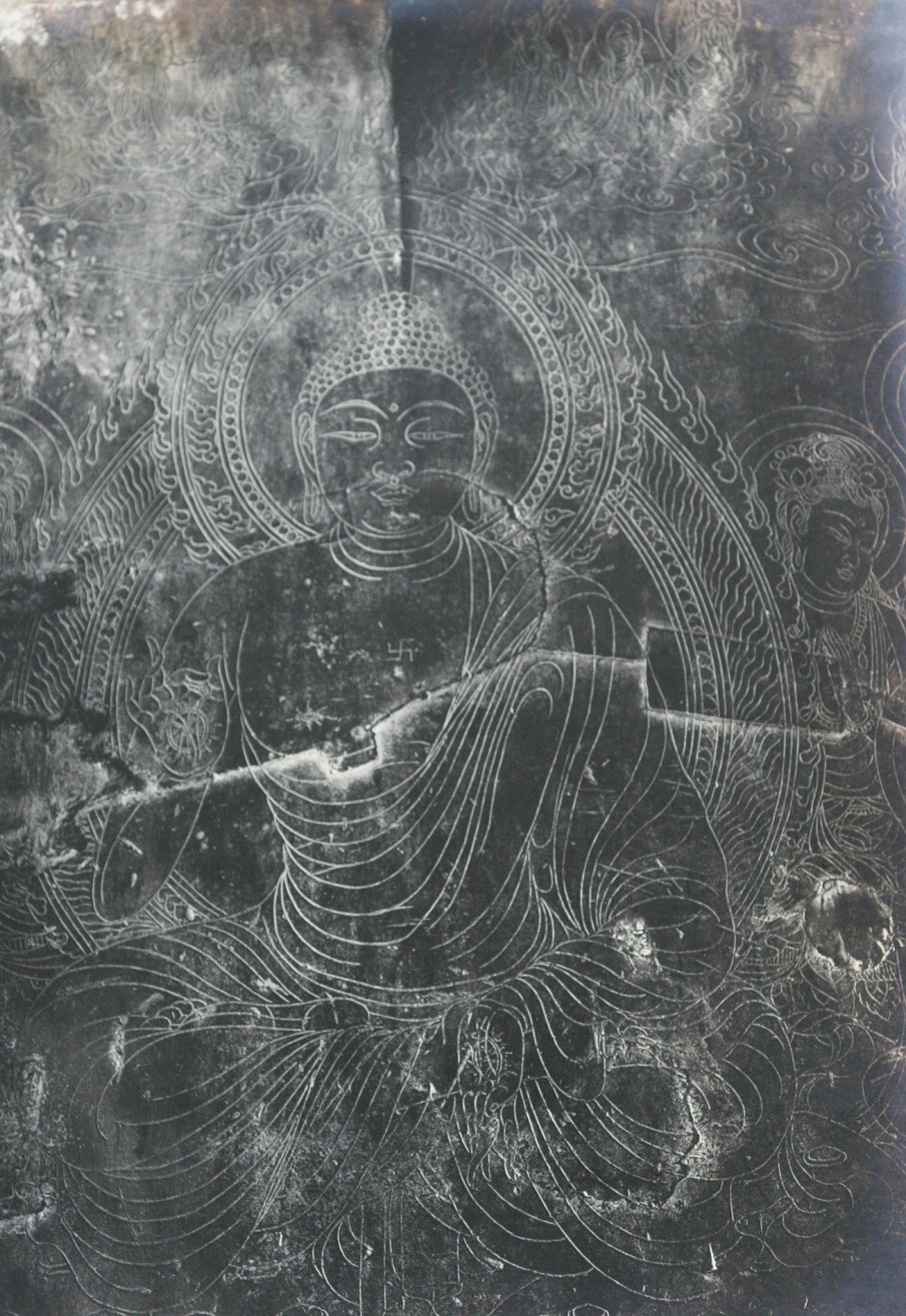
Incised image on Lotus Petal of the throne of the main Buddha, 8th century.

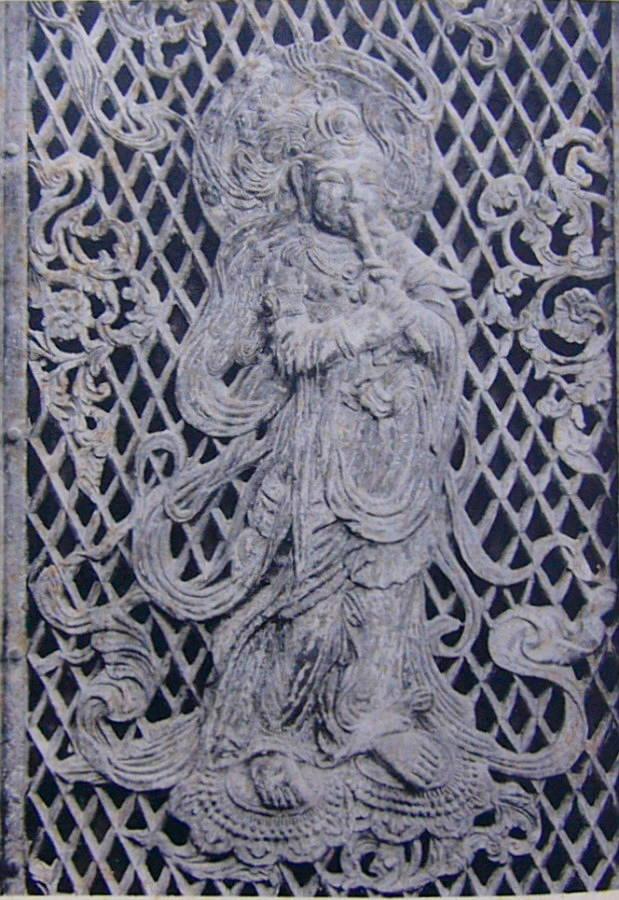
Relief of a Krishna previous Bodhisattva playing a flute on the temple's 8th century Octagonal Lantern.

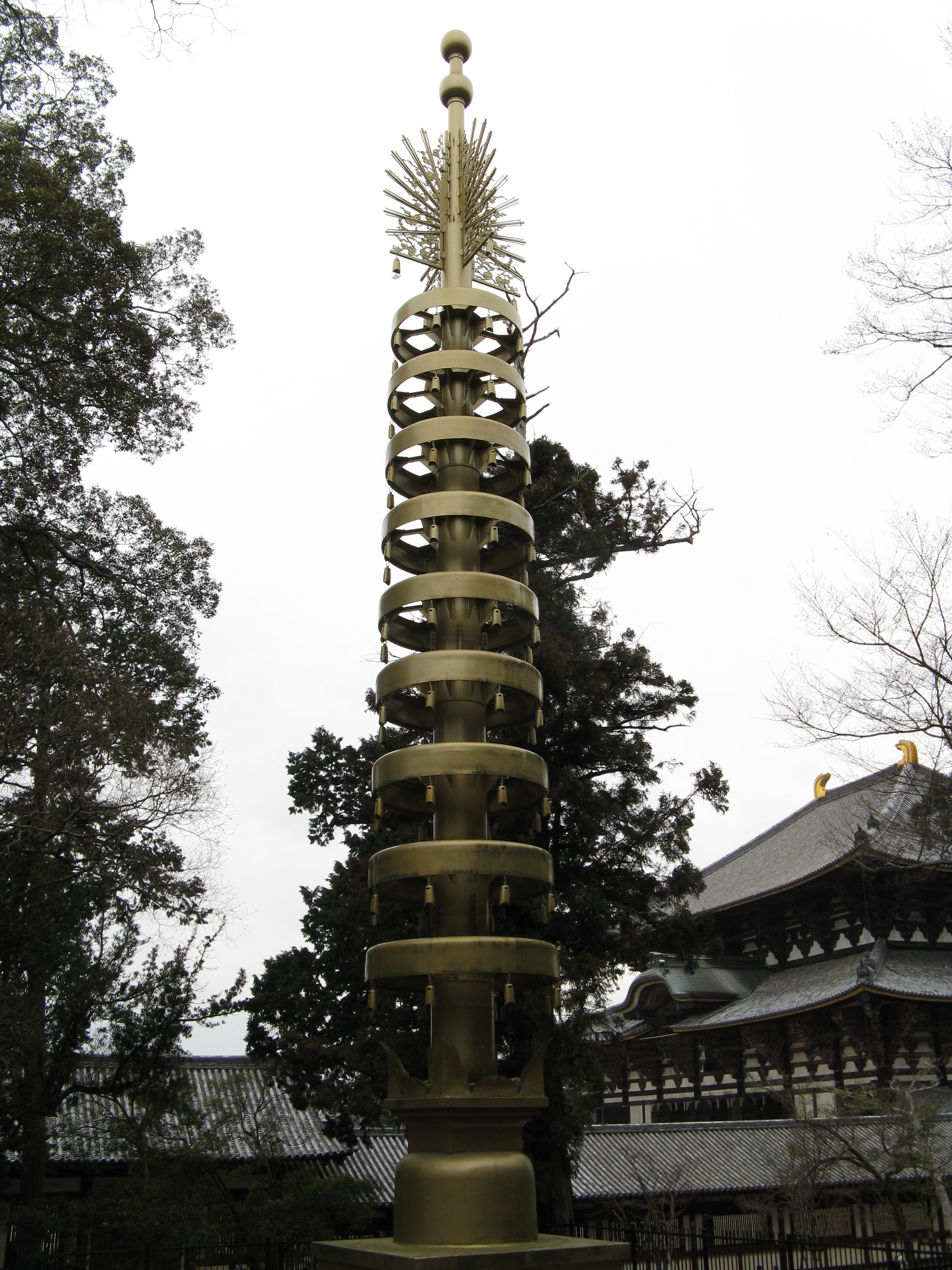
Sōrin

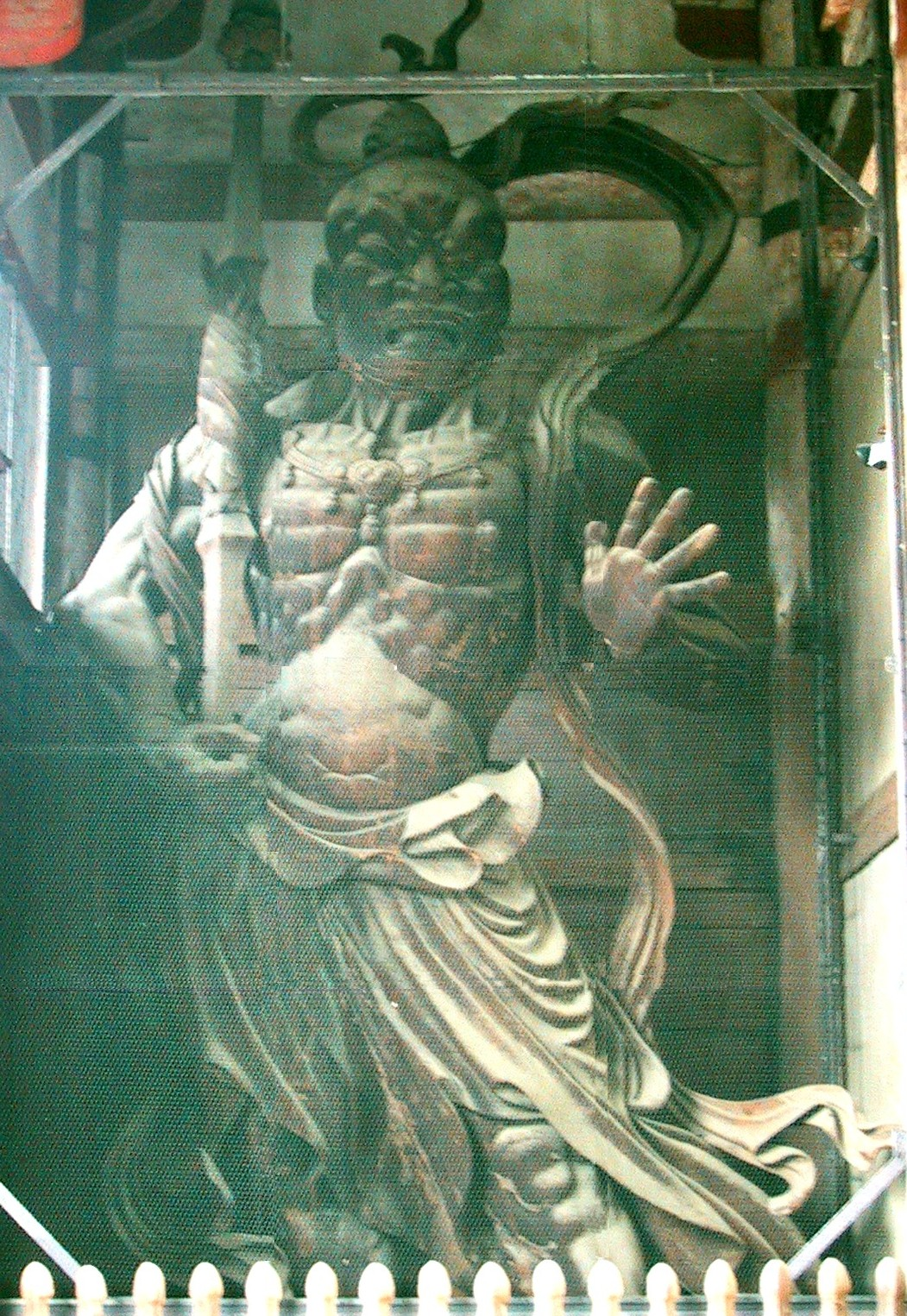
Agyo, one of two great gate guardians within Nandaimon, was created by Unkei, Kaikei, and other sculptors in 1203

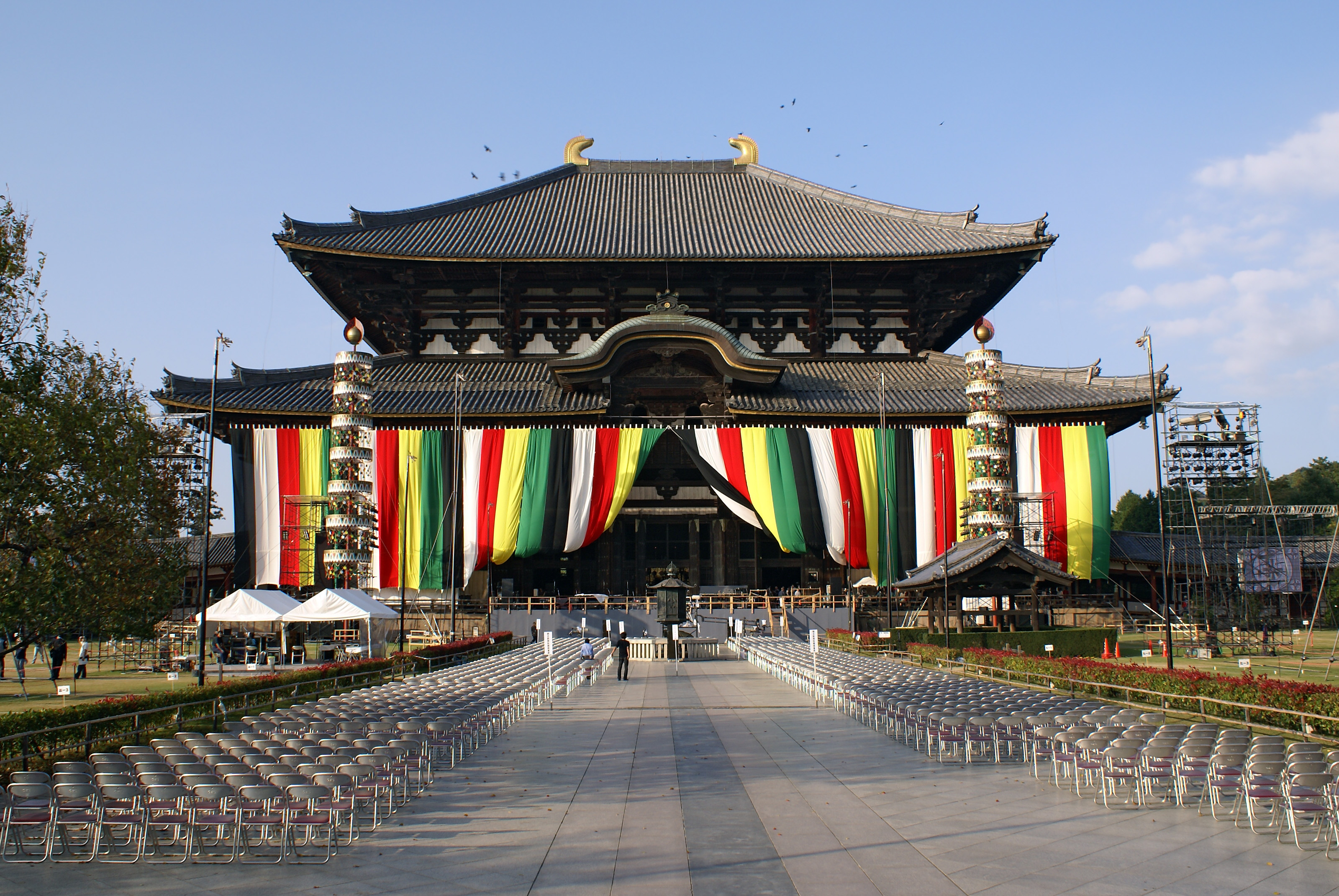
The main hall, with festival decorations

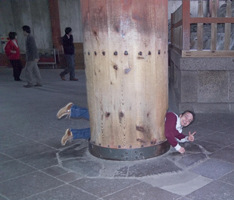
A supporting post in the Daibutsuden has a hole said to be the same size as one of the Daibutsu's nostrils. Legend has it that those who pass through it will be blessed with enlightenment in their next life.

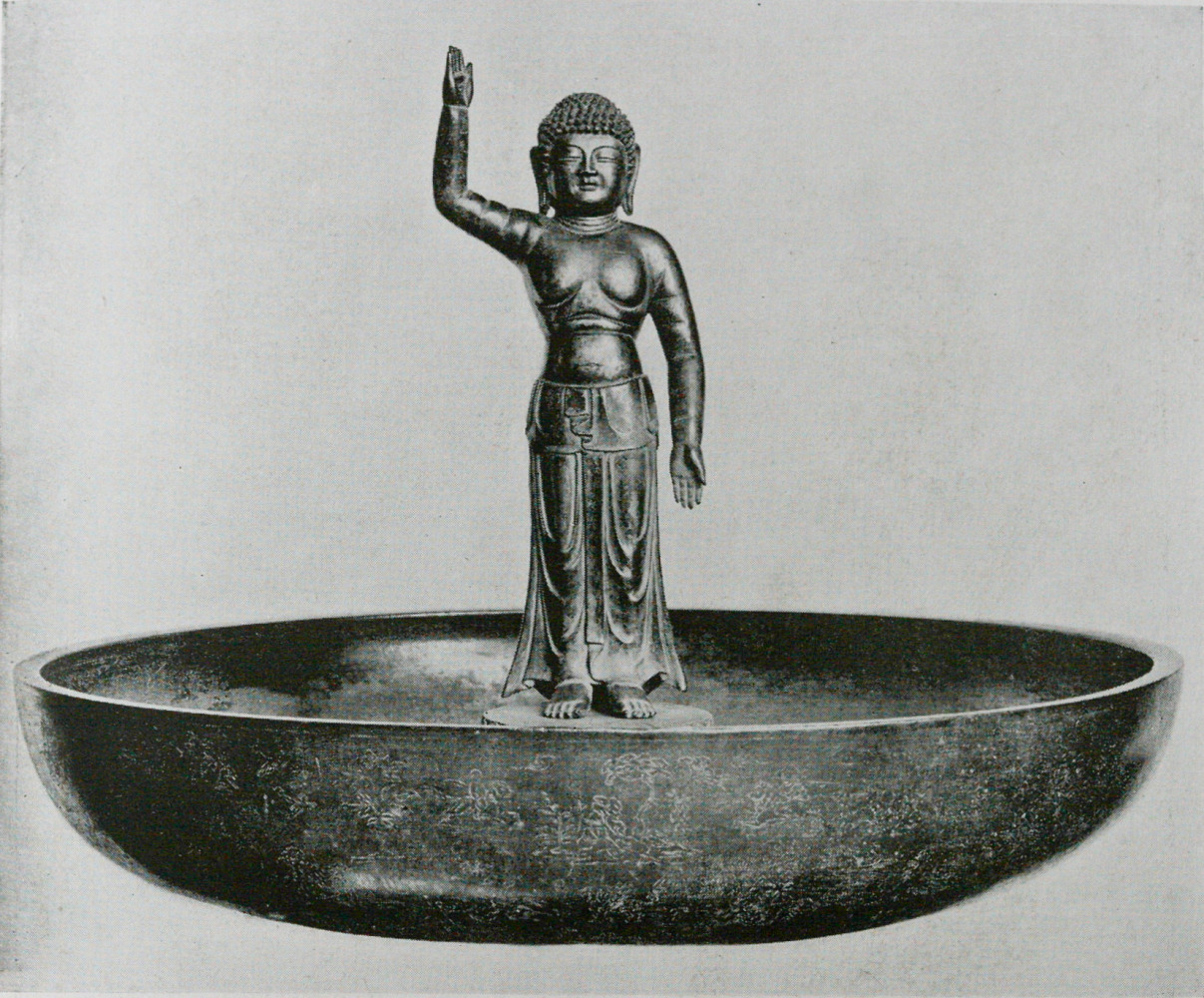
Shaka at Birth (National Treasure)

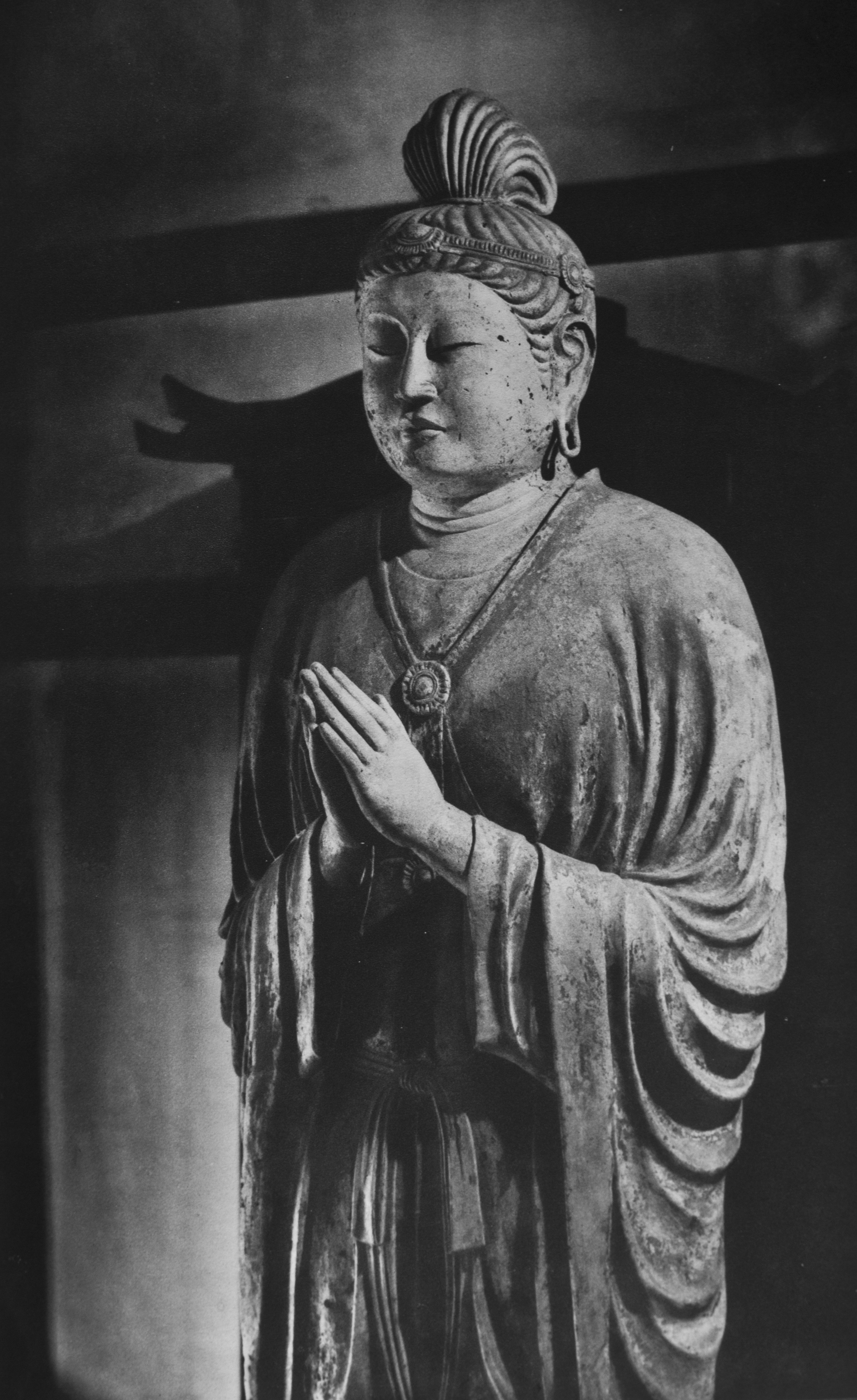
Gakko Bosatsu

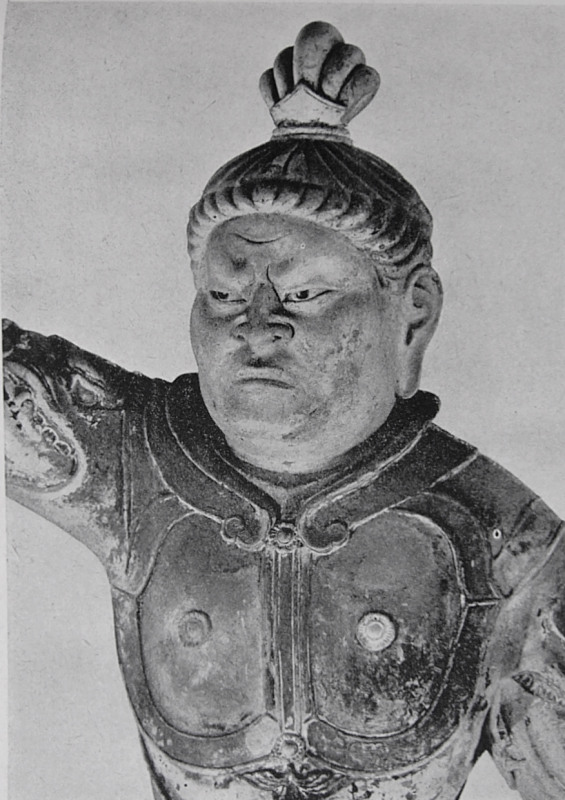
TAMONTEN

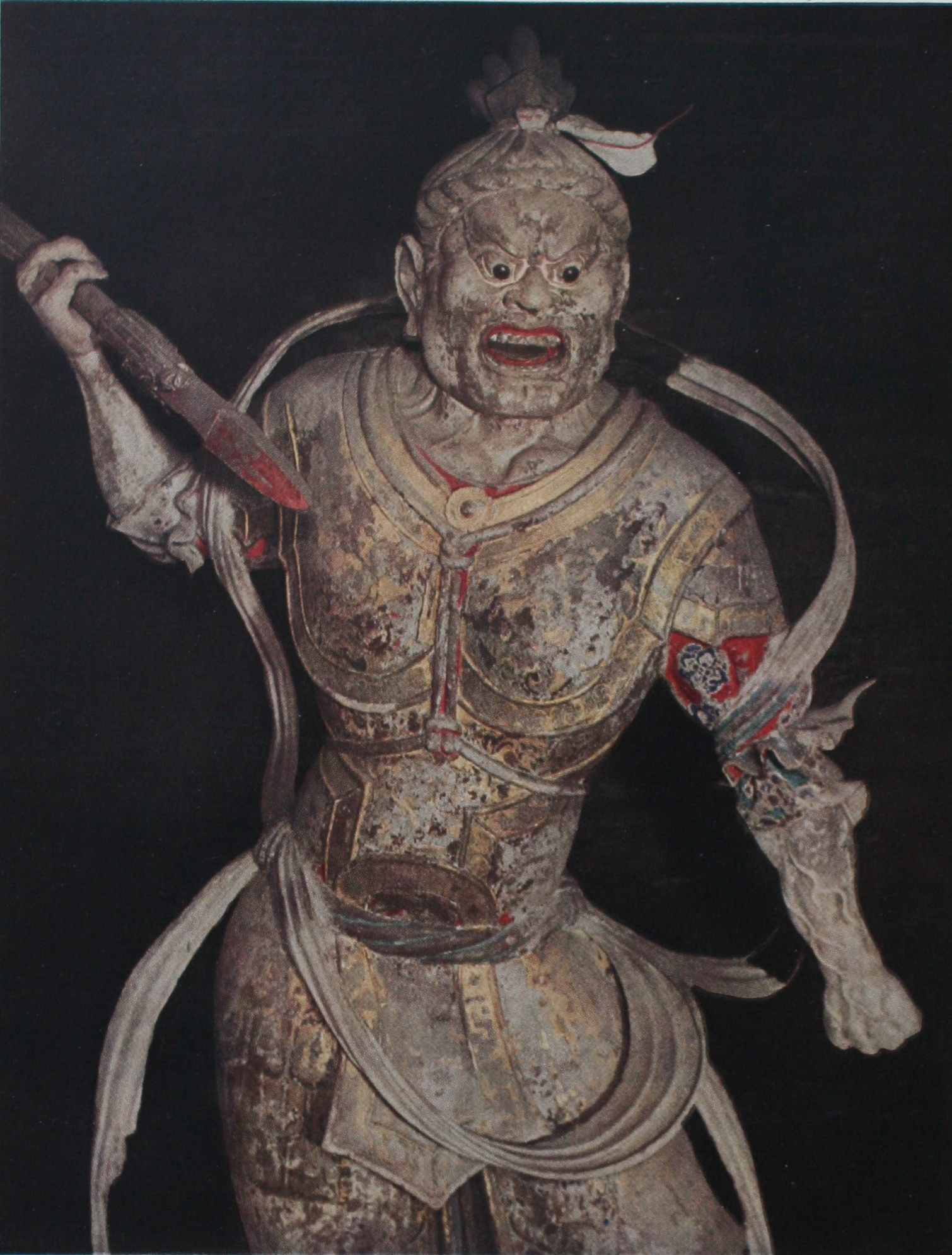
Vajirapani Shukongoshin

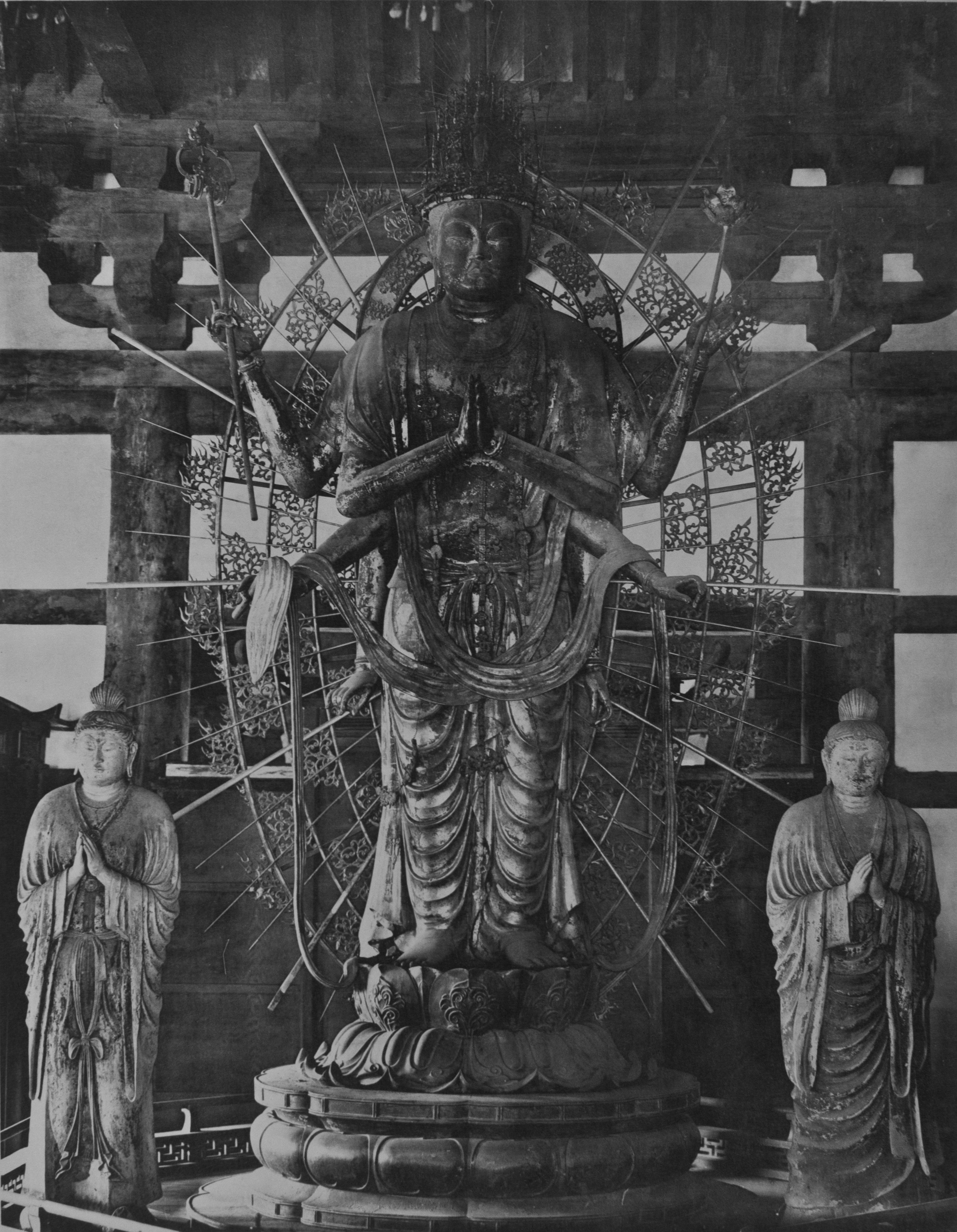
Fukukensaku Kwannon of Hokkedo

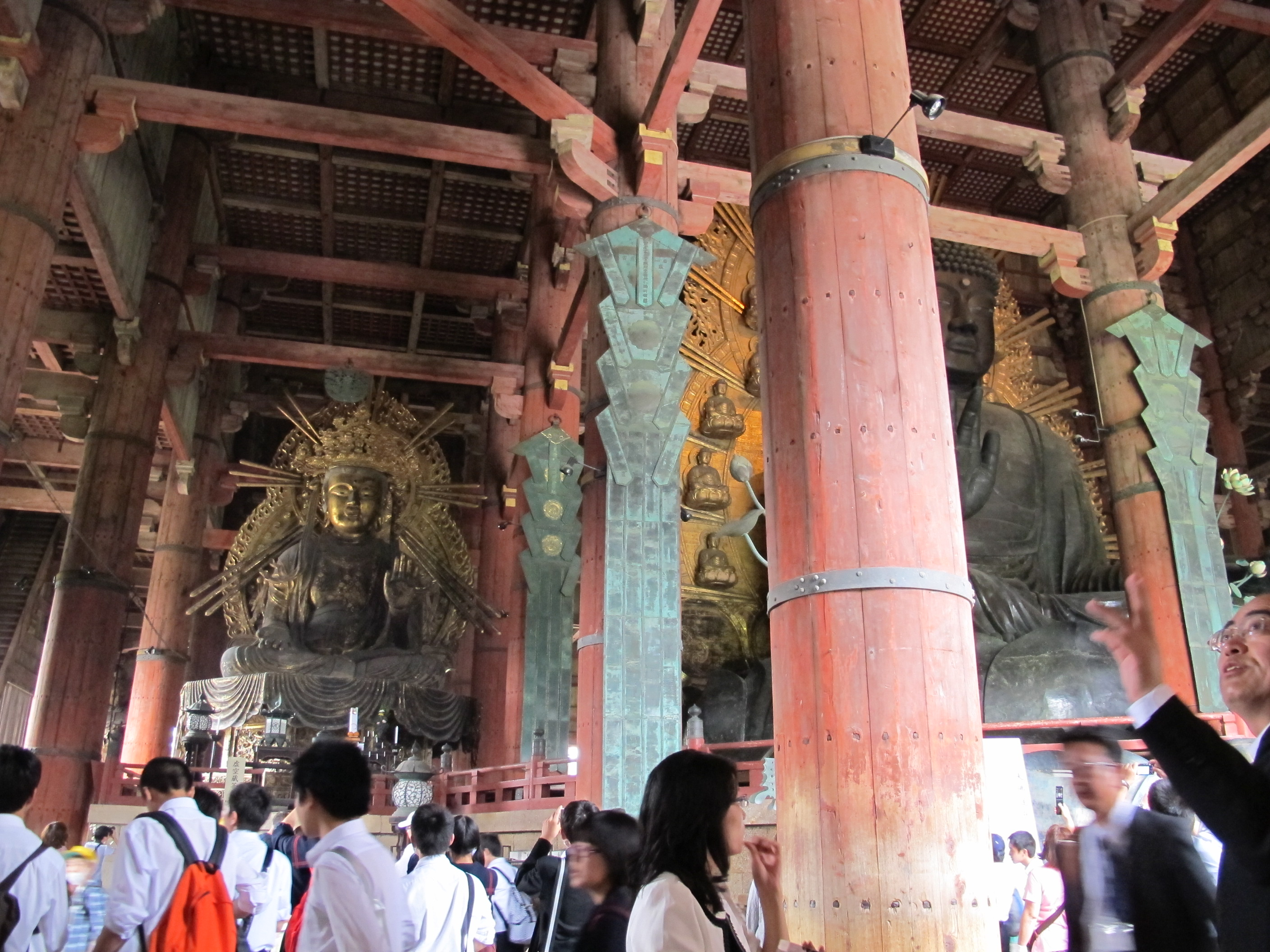
Kokūzō Bosatsu

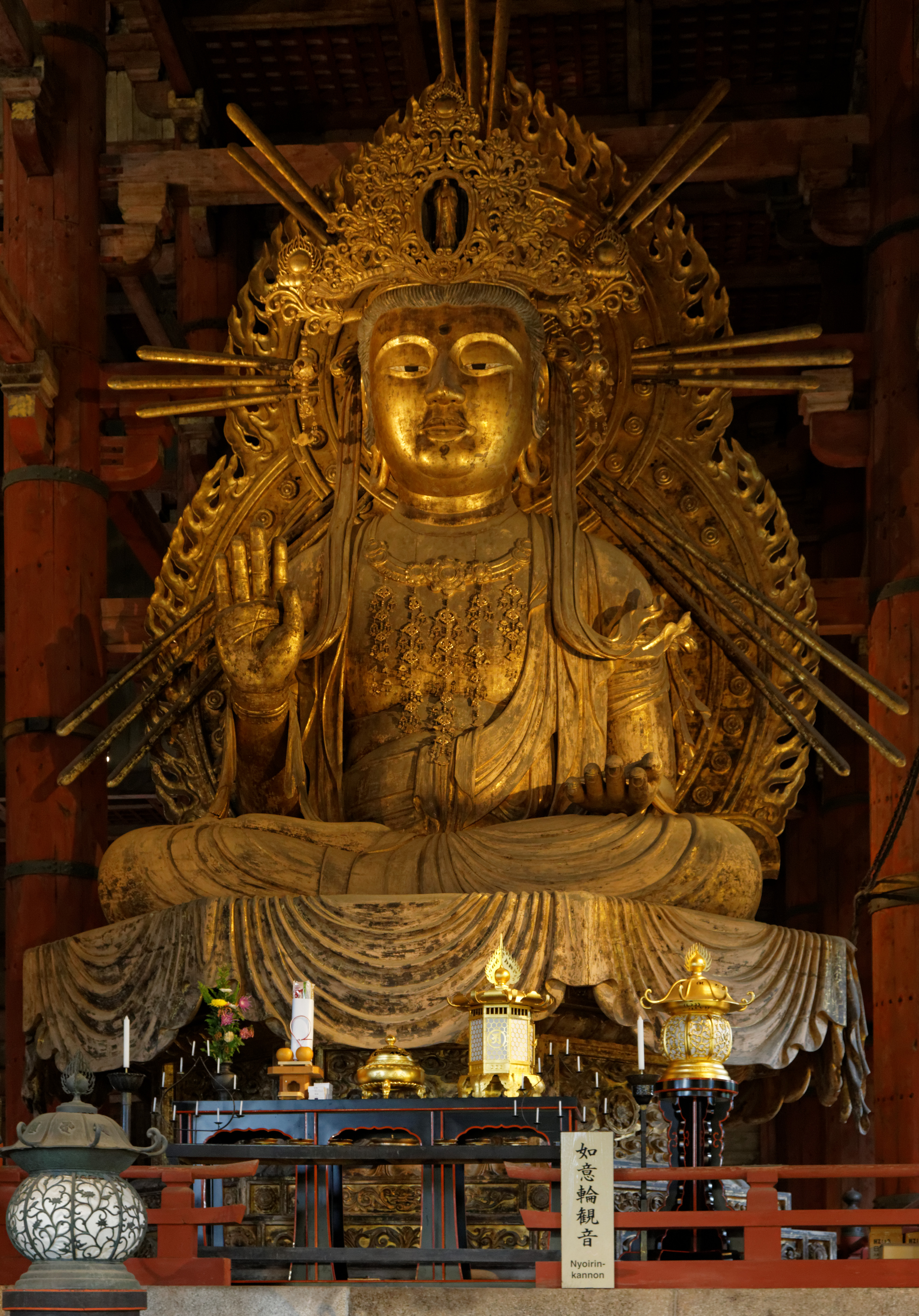
Nyoirin-kannon

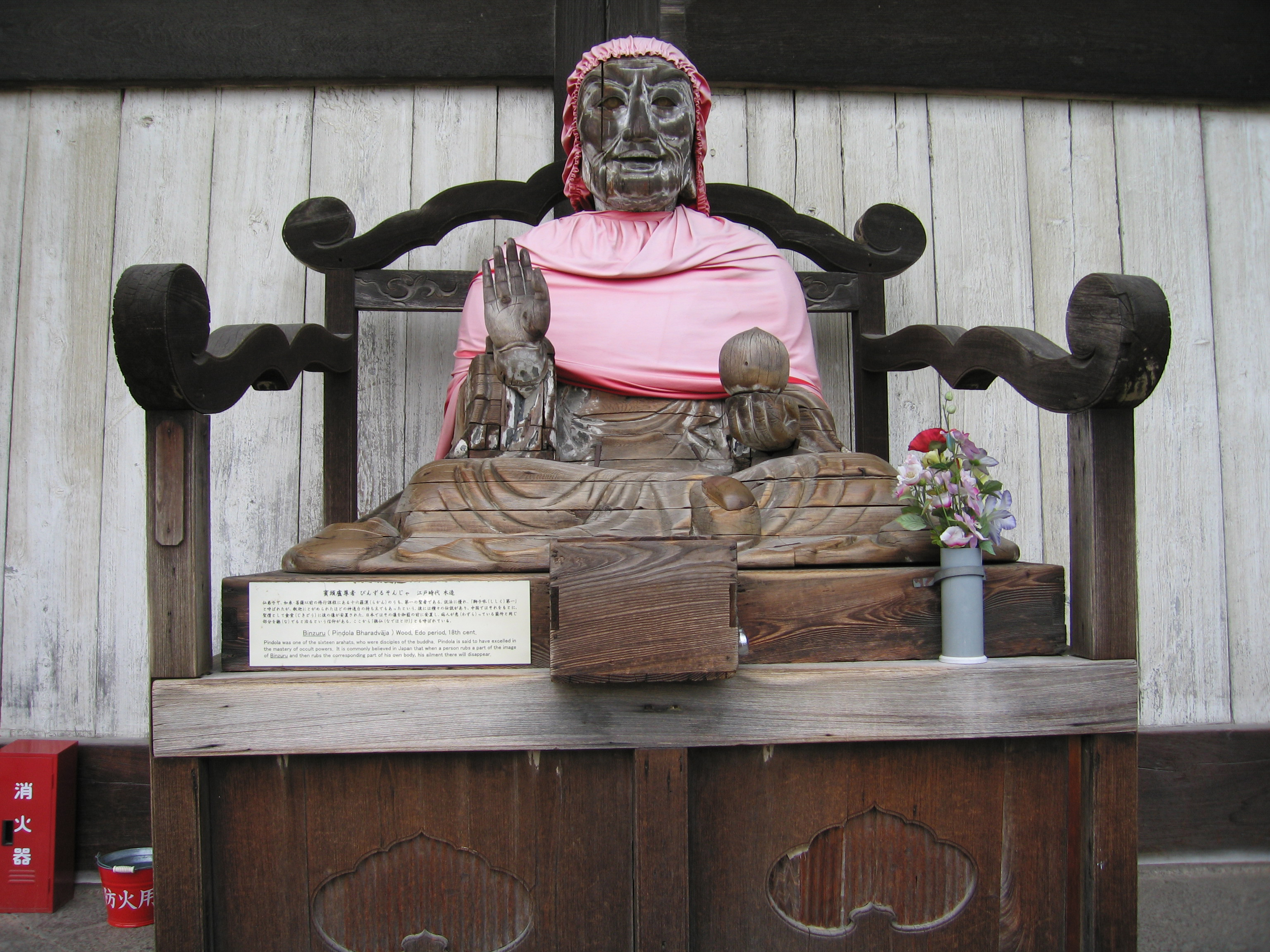
Wooden Binzuru (healer) sculpture at Todai-ji temple

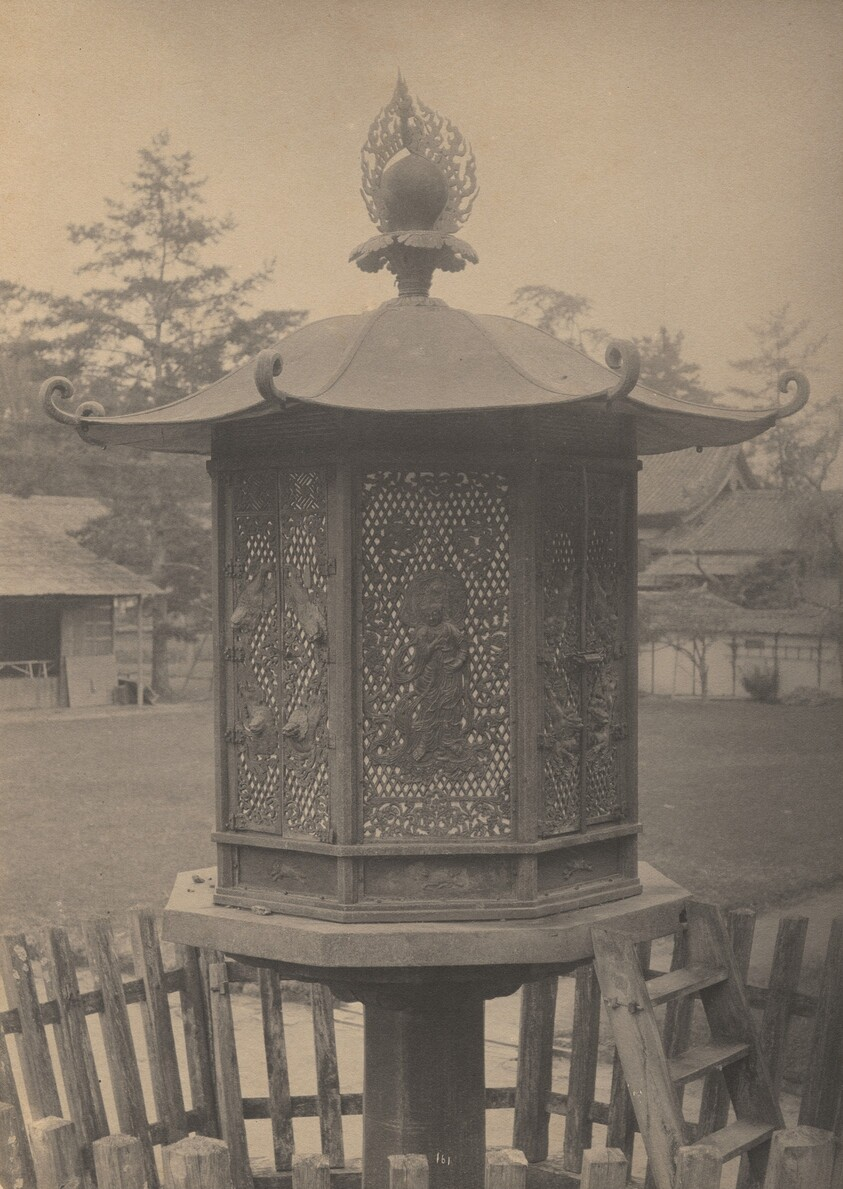
Octagonal Lantern

== See also ==
- Kanjin#Kanjinshoku of Todai-ji
- Kōtoku-in, location of the Kamakura Great Buddha
- List of National Treasures of Japan (ancient documents)
- List of National Treasures of Japan (archaeological materials)
- List of National Treasures of Japan (crafts-others)
- List of National Treasures of Japan (paintings)
- List of National Treasures of Japan (sculptures)
- List of National Treasures of Japan (temples)
- List of National Treasures of Japan (writings)
- List of tallest structures built before the 20th century
- Nanto Shichi Daiji, Seven Great Temples of Nanto
- Old Government Buildings (Wellington), New Zealand – second-largest wooden building in the world
- Ostankino Palace, third-largest wooden building in the world
- Shōhō-ji, location of the Gifu Great Buddha
- Siege of Nara
- Tamukeyama Hachiman Shrine, Shinto shrine near the temple precincts
- Tourism in Japan
- Tōdai-ji Hachiman
