= Sangamori Station =

Railway station in Kitakyushu, Fukuoka prefecture, Japan

Sangamori Station 三ヶ森駅
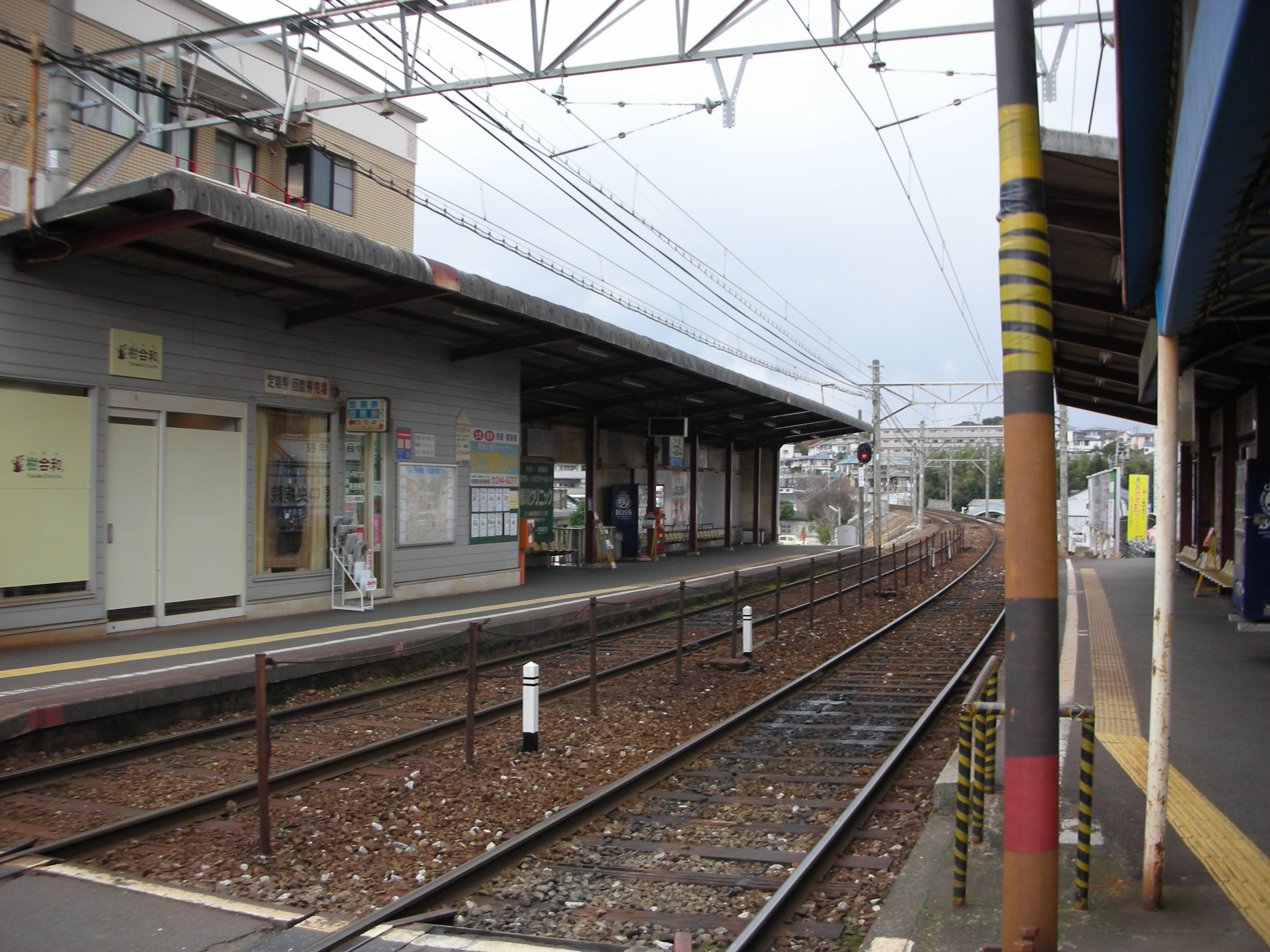
- Sangamori Station platform

General information
- Location: 1-chōme-6 Sangamori, Yahatanishi-ku, Kitakyūshū-shi, Fukuoka-ken 807-0843; Japan
- Coordinates: 33°50′4.82″N 130°44′9.81″E
- Operator: Chikuhō Electric Railroad
- Line: ■ Chikuhō Electric Railroad Line
- Platforms: 2 side platforms

Other information
- Station code: CK 09
- Website: Official website

History
- Opened: 26 April 1957

Passengers
- FY2021: 2048
Location
- Location within Fukuoka Prefecture Location within Japan

Sangamori Station (三ヶ森駅, Sangamori-eki) is a passenger railway station located in Yahatanishi-ku, Kitakyūshū. It is operated by the private transportation company Chikuhō Electric Railroad (Chikutetsu), and has station number CK09.

== Lines ==
The station is served by the Chikuhō Electric Railroad Line and is 5.0 kilometers from the terminus of the line at Kurosaki Station.

== Station layout ==
The station is elevated station with two side platforms connected by a level crossing. The station is unattended.

== Platforms ==
1	■ Chikuhō Electric Railroad Line	for Chikuhō-Nōgata
2	■ Chikuhō Electric Railroad Line	for Kurosaki

== Adjacent stations ==
←	Service	→
Chikuhō Electric Railroad Line
Einomaru	Local	Nishiyama

== History ==
The station opened on 26 April 1957.

== Passenger statistics ==
In fiscal 2021, the station was used by 2048 passengers daily.

== Surrounding area ==
- Kitakyushu City Nakao Elementary School
- Kitakyushu City Okita Junior High School

== See also ==
- List of railway stations in Japan
