= Nishi-Kurosaki Station =

Railway station in Kitakyushu, Fukuoka prefecture, Japan

Nishi-Kurosaki Station 西黒崎駅
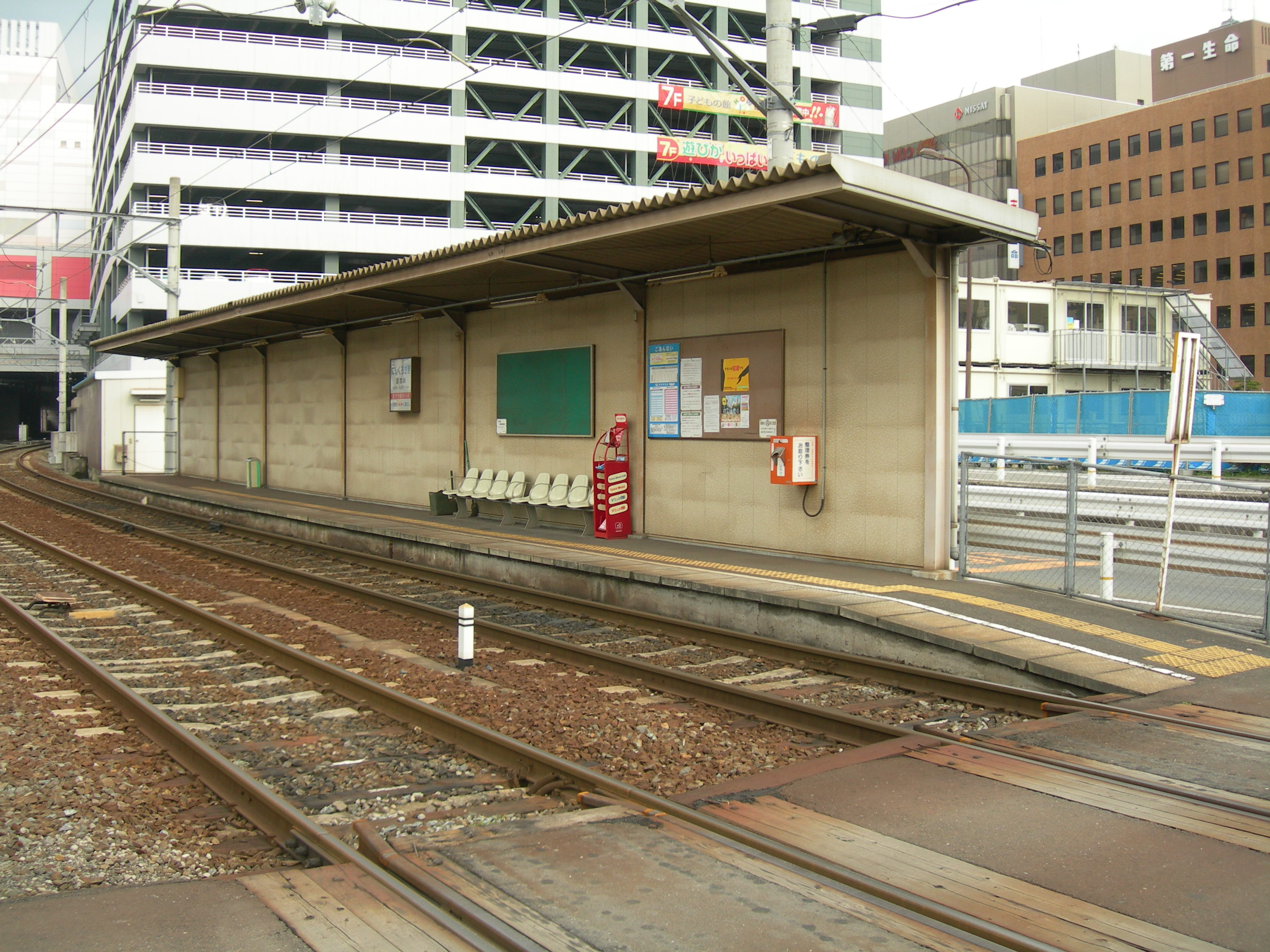
- Nishi Kurosaki Station platform

General information
- Location: 3-chōme-14 Kurosaki, Yahatanishi-ku, Kitakyushu-shi, Fukuoka-ken 806-0021; Japan
- Coordinates: 33°51′58.98″N 130°45′44.18″E
- Operator: Chikuhō Electric Railroad
- Line: ■ Chikuhō Electric Railroad Line
- Platforms: 2 side platforms

Other information
- Station code: CK 02
- Website: Official website

History
- Opened: 25 October 1992

Passengers
- FY2021: 164
Location
- Location within Fukuoka Prefecture Location within Japan

Nishi-Kurosaki Station (西黒崎駅, Nishi-kurosaki-eki) is a passenger railway station located in Yahatanishi-ku, Kitakyūshū. It is operated by the private transportation company Chikuhō Electric Railroad (Chikutetsu), and has station number CK02.

The station was temporarily closed on 1 October 2021 for approximately 4 years due to construction of the National Route 3 Kurosaki Bypass. As of April 2026, the station has not reopened.

== Lines ==
The station is served by the Chikuhō Electric Railroad Line and is 0.2 kilometers from the terminus of the line at Kurosaki Station.

== Station layout ==
The station consists of two side platforms connected by a level crossing. The station is unattended.

== Platforms ==
| 1 | ■ Chikuhō Electric Railroad Line | for Chikuhō-Nōgata |
| 2 | ■ Chikuhō Electric Railroad Line | for Kurosaki |

== Adjacent stations ==
| ← | Service | → |
Chikuhō Electric Railroad Line
| Kurosaki-Ekimae | Local | Kumanishi |

== History ==
The station opened on 25 October 1992.

The station was temporarily closed on 1 October 2021 for approximately 4 years due to construction of the National Route 3 Kurosaki Bypass. As of April 2026, the station has not reopened.

== Passenger statistics ==
In fiscal 2021, the station was used by 164 passengers daily.

== Surrounding area ==
- Kitakyushu City Tsutsui Elementary School
- Japan National Route 3
- Japan National Route 200

== See also ==
- List of railway stations in Japan
