= Nishiyama Station (Fukuoka) =

Rail station in Yahatanishi-ku, Kitakyūshū, Japan

Nishiyama Station 西山駅
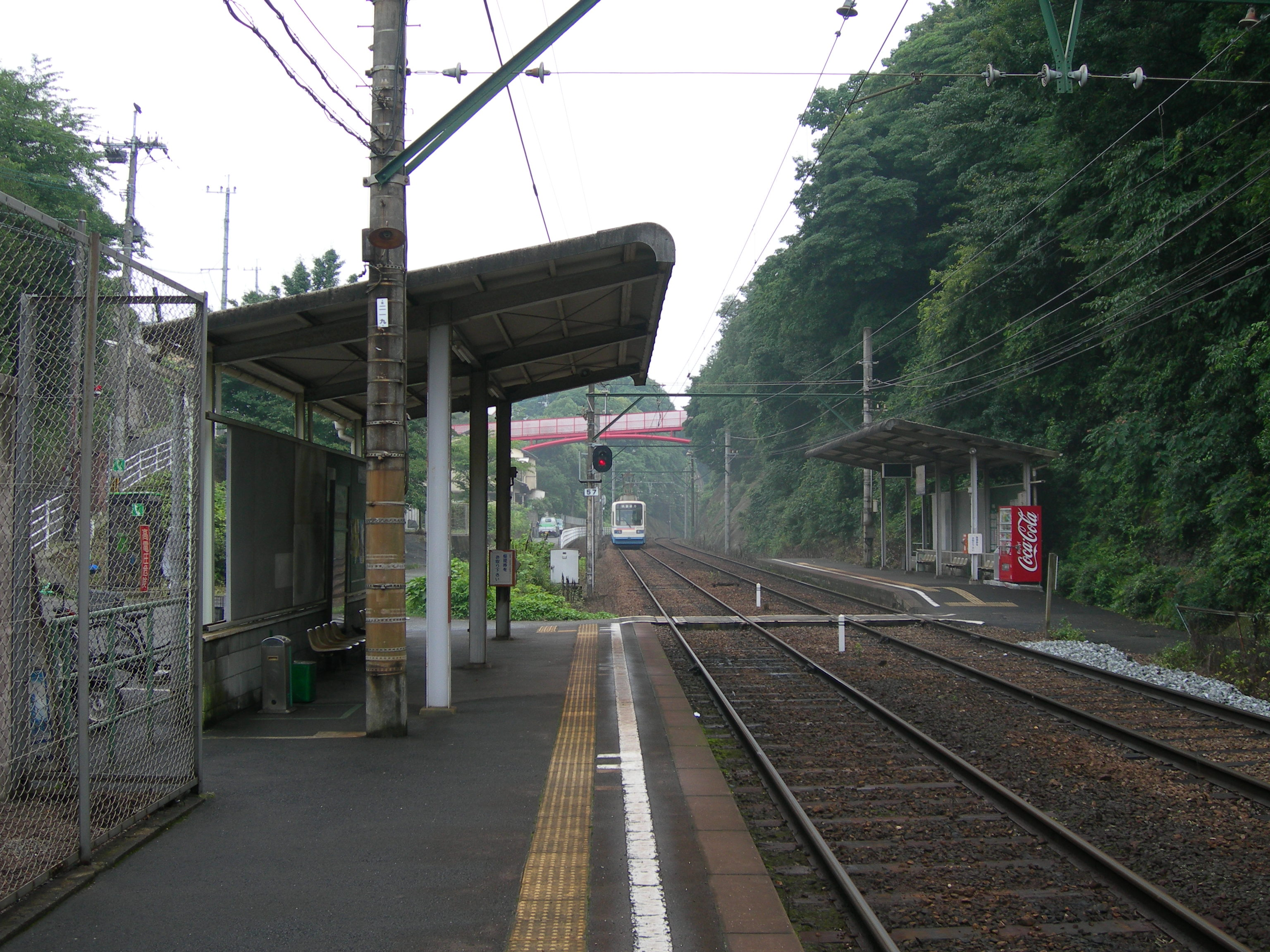
- Nishiyama Station platform

General information
- Location: 5-chōme-16 Einomaru Minamimachi, Yahatanishi-ku, Kitakyūshū-shi, Fukuoka-ken 807-0845; Japan
- Coordinates: 33°49′47.13″N 130°43′56.66″E
- Operator: Chikuhō Electric Railroad
- Line: ■ Chikuhō Electric Railroad Line
- Platforms: 2 side platforms

Other information
- Station code: CK 10
- Website: Official website

History
- Opened: 24 December 1965

Passengers
- FY2021: 278
Location
- Location within Fukuoka Prefecture Location within Japan

Nishiyama Station (西山駅, Nishiyama-eki) located in Yahatanishi-ku, Kitakyūshū. It is operated by the private transportation company Chikuhō Electric Railroad (Chikutetsu), and has station number CK10.

== Lines ==
The station is served by the Chikuhō Electric Railroad Line and is 5.7 kilometers from the terminus of the line at Kurosaki Station.

== Station layout ==
The station consists of two staggered opposed side platforms connected by a level crossing. The station is unattended.

== Platforms ==
1	■ Chikuhō Electric Railroad Line	for Chikuhō-Nōgata
2	■ Chikuhō Electric Railroad Line	for Kurosaki-Ekimae

== Adjacent stations ==
←	Service	→
Chikuhō Electric Railroad Line
Sangamori	Local	Tōritani

== History ==
The station opened on 24 December 1965.

== Passenger statistics ==
In fiscal 2021, the station was used by 278 passengers daily.

== Surrounding area ==
- Kasugadai Community Center

== See also ==
- List of railway stations in Japan
