= Kumanishi Station =

Railway station in Kitakyushu, Fukuoka prefecture, Japan

Kumanishi Station 熊西駅
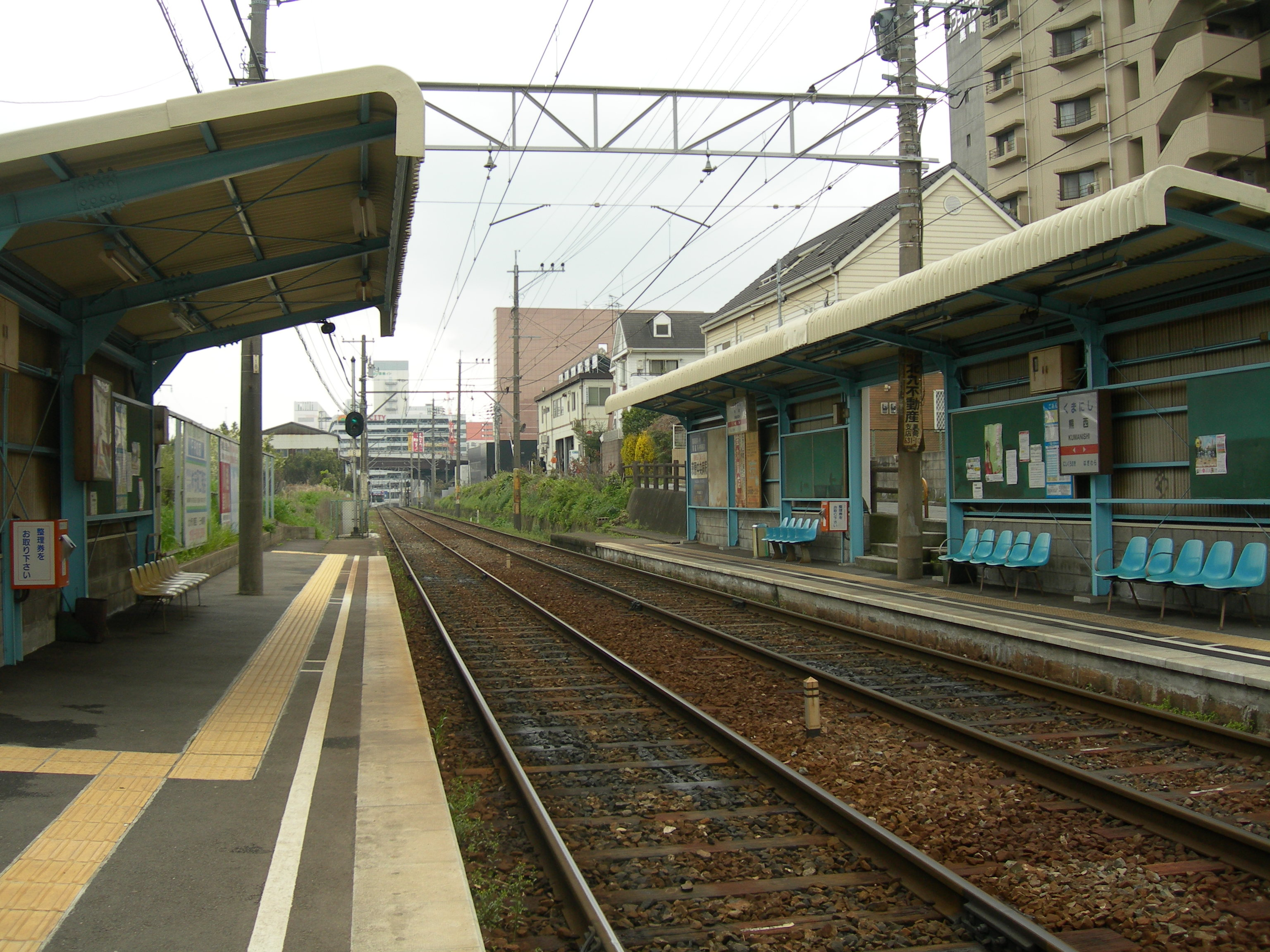
- Kumanishi Station platform

General information
- Location: 1-chōme-1 Kumanishi, Yahatanishi-ku, Kitakyushu-shi, Fukuoka-ken 806-0031; Japan
- Coordinates: 33°51′57.82″N 130°45′28.6″E
- Operator: Chikuhō Electric Railroad
- Line: ■ Chikuhō Electric Railroad Line
- Platforms: 2 side platforms

Other information
- Station code: CK 03
- Website: Official website

History
- Opened: 25 June 1914

Passengers
- FY2021: 444
Location
- Location within Fukuoka Prefecture Location within Japan

Kumanishi Station (熊西駅, Kumanishi-eki) is a passenger railway station located in Yahatanishi-ku, Kitakyūshū. It is operated by the private transportation company Chikuhō Electric Railroad (Chikutetsu), and has station number CK03.

== Lines ==
The station is served by the Chikuhō Electric Railroad Line and is 0.6 kilometers from the terminus of the line at Kurosaki Station.

== Station layout ==
The station consists of two side platforms connected by a level crossing. The station is unattended.

== Platforms ==
1	■ Chikuhō Electric Railroad Line	for Chikuhō-Nōgata
2	■ Chikuhō Electric Railroad Line	for Kurosaki

== Adjacent stations ==
←	Service	→
Chikuhō Electric Railroad Line
Nishi-Kurosaki	Local	Hagiwara

== History ==
The station opened on 25 June 1914 as a stop on the Nishitetsu Kitakyushu Line (then Kyushu Electric Tramway).

== Passenger statistics ==
In fiscal 2021, the station was used by 444 passengers daily.

== Surrounding area ==
- Kitakyushu City Kumanishi Junior High School
- Kitakyushu City Tsutsui Elementary School

== See also ==
- List of railway stations in Japan
