= Anō Station (Fukuoka) =

Railway station in Kitakyushu, Fukuoka prefecture, Japan

Anō Station 穴生駅
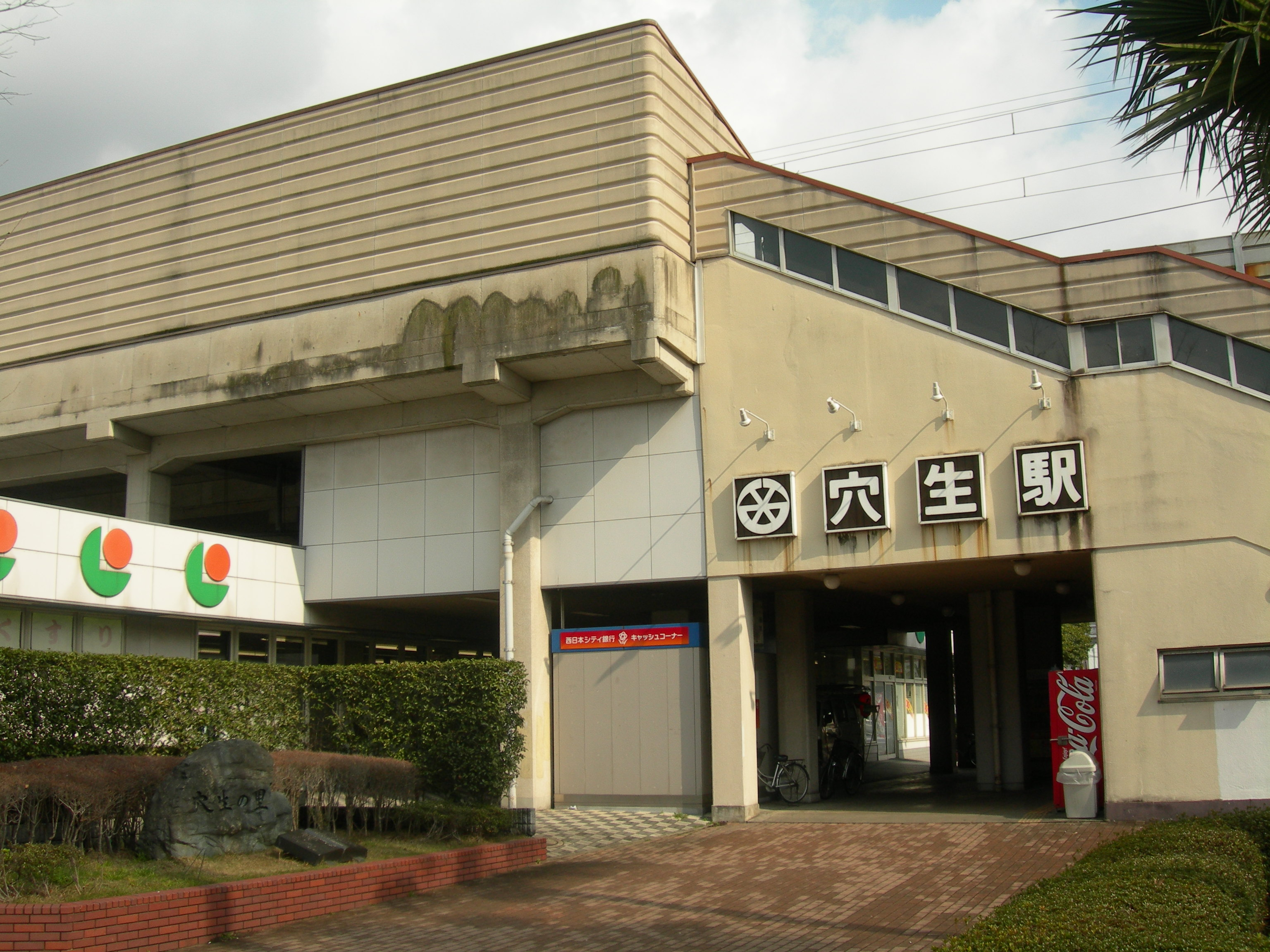
- Anō Station entrance

General information
- Location: 1-chōme-8 Anō, Yahatanishi-ku, Kitakyushu-shi, Fukuoka-ken 806-0049; Japan
- Coordinates: 33°51′26.98″N 130°44′41.73″E
- Operator: Chikuhō Electric Railroad
- Line: ■ Chikuhō Electric Railroad Line
- Platforms: 2 side platforms

Construction
- Structure type: elevated

Other information
- Station code: CK 05
- Website: Official website

History
- Opened: 21 March 1956

Passengers
- FY2021: 890
Location
- Location within Fukuoka Prefecture Location within Japan

Anō Station (穴生駅, Anō-eki) is a passenger railway station located in Yahatanishi-ku, Kitakyūshū. It is operated by the private transportation company Chikuhō Electric Railroad (Chikutetsu), and has station number CK05.

== Lines ==
The station is served by the Chikuhō Electric Railroad Line and is 2.3 kilometers from the terminus of the line at Kurosaki Station.

== Station layout ==
The station consists of two side platforms connected by an elevated station building.

== Platforms ==
1	■ Chikuhō Electric Railroad Line	for Chikuhō-Nōgata
2	■ Chikuhō Electric Railroad Line	for Kurosaki

== Adjacent stations ==
←	Service	→
Chikuhō Electric Railroad Line
Hagiwara	Local	Morishita

== History ==
The station opened on 21 March 1956. The station building was rebuilt as an elevated station building in 1982.

== Passenger statistics ==
In fiscal 2021, the station was used by 890 passengers daily.

== Surrounding area ==
- Kitakyushu City Anou Elementary School
- Kitakyushu City Yawata Special Needs School
- Hagiwara Elementary School

== See also ==
- List of railway stations in Japan
