= Chikuhō-Katsuki Station =

Railway station in Kyūshū, Japan

Chikuhō-Katsuki Station 筑豊香月駅
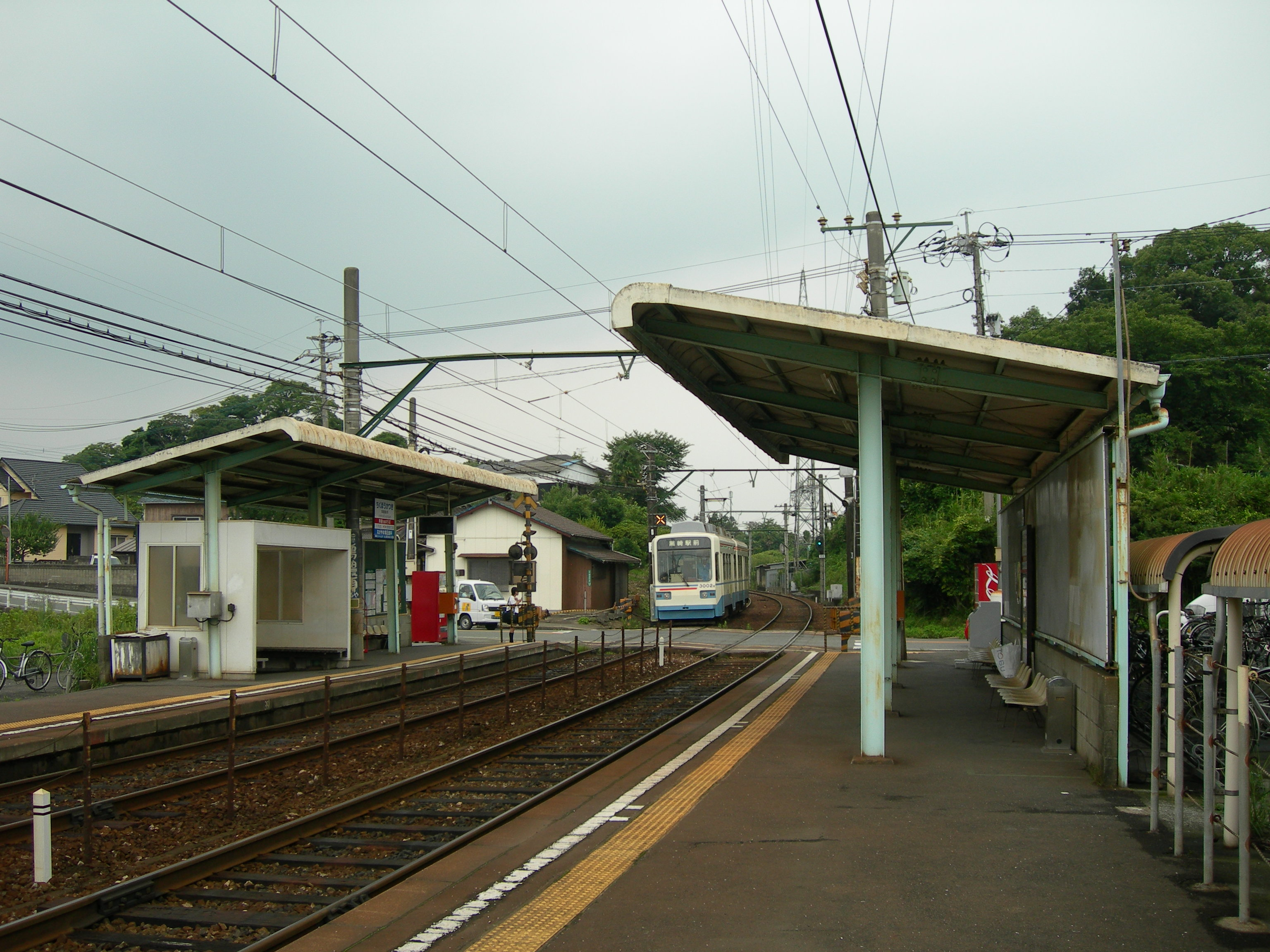
- Chikuhō-Katsuki Station platform

General information
- Location: 2 Chome Takae, Yahatanishi-ku, Kitakyūshū-shi, Fukuoka-ken 807-1152; Japan
- Coordinates: 33°47′58.89″N 130°43′7.44″E
- Operator: Chikuhō Electric Railroad
- Line: ■ Chikuhō Electric Railroad Line
- Platforms: 2 side platforms

Other information
- Station code: CK 15
- Website: Official website

History
- Opened: 29 April 1958

Passengers
- FY2021: 475
Location
- Location within Fukuoka Prefecture Location within Japan

Chikuhō-Katsuki Station (筑豊香月駅, Chikuhō-katsuki-eki) is a passenger railway station located in Yahatanishi-ku, Kitakyūshū. It is operated by the private transportation company Chikuhō Electric Railroad (Chikutetsu), and has station number CK15.

== Lines ==
The station is served by the Chikuhō Electric Railroad Line and is 10.2 kilometers from the terminus of the line at Kurosaki Station.

== Station layout ==
The station consists of two side platforms connected by a level crossing. The station is unattended.

== Platforms ==
1	■ Chikuhō Electric Railroad Line	for Chikuhō-Nōgata
2	■ Chikuhō Electric Railroad Line	for Kurosaki

== Adjacent stations ==
←	Service	→
Chikuhō Electric Railroad Line
Kibōgaoka-Kōkōmae	Local	Kusubashi

== History ==
The station opened on 29 April 1958.

== Passenger statistics ==
In fiscal 2021, the station was used by 475 passengers daily.

== Surrounding area ==
- Katsuki Central Park
- Katsuki Post Office
- Katsuki Elementary School
- Fukuoka Prefectural Route 61

== See also ==
- List of railway stations in Japan
