= Tōritani Station =

Railway station in Nakama, Fukuoka prefecture, Japan

Tōritani Station 通谷駅
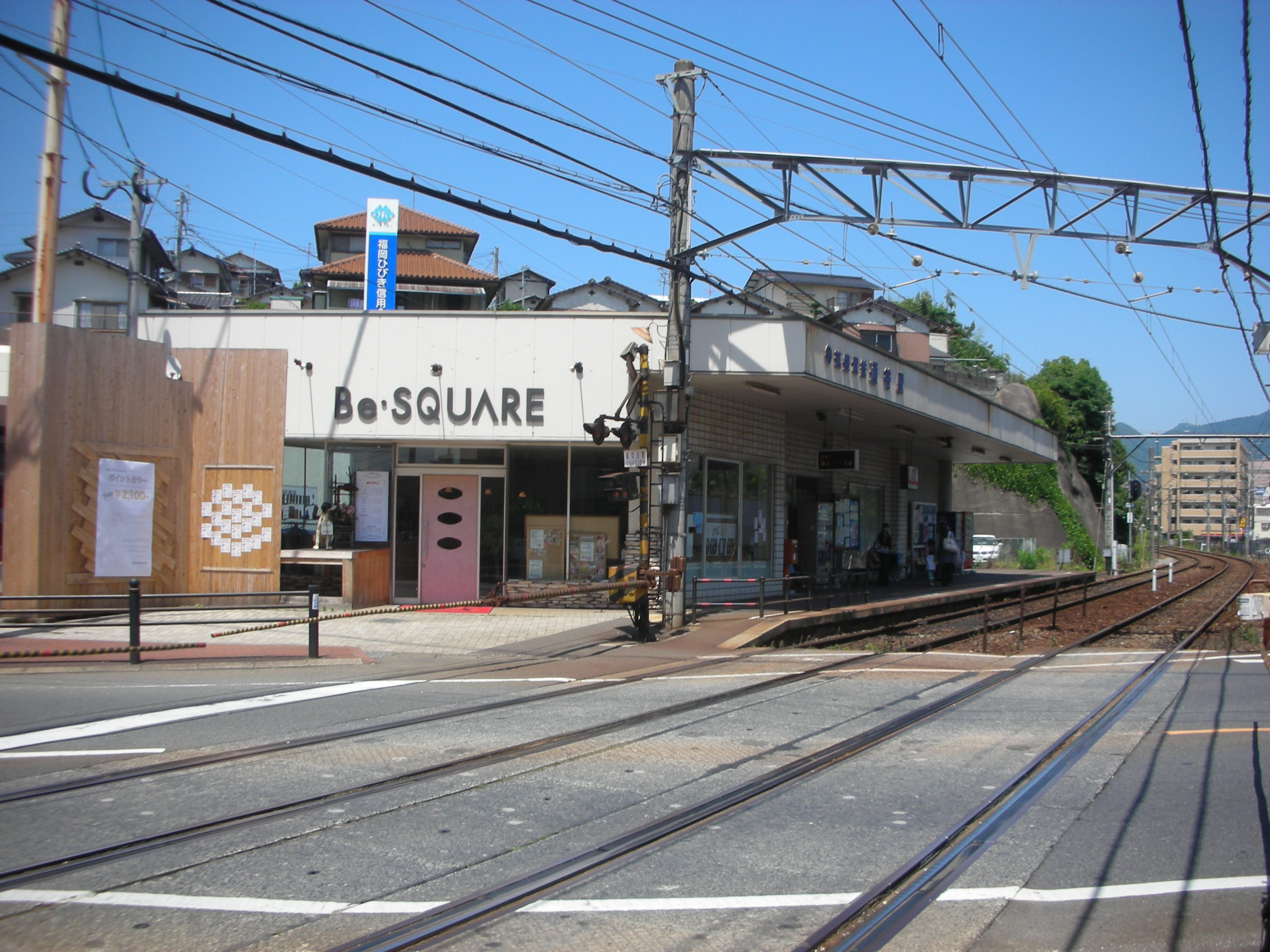
- Tōritani Station platform

General information
- Location: 1-3-1 Taga, Nakama-shi, Fukuoka-ken 809-0015; Japan
- Coordinates: 33°49′22.44″N 130°43′36.14″E
- Operator: Chikuhō Electric Railroad
- Line: ■ Chikuhō Electric Railroad Line
- Platforms: 2 side platforms

Other information
- Station code: CK 11
- Website: Official website

History
- Opened: 27 December 1964

Passengers
- FY2021: 1252
Location
- Location within Fukuoka Prefecture Location within Japan

Tōritani Station (通谷駅, Tōritani-eki) located in the city of Nakama, Fukuoka. It is operated by the private transportation company Chikuhō Electric Railroad (Chikutetsu), and has station number CK11.

== Lines ==
The station is served by the Chikuhō Electric Railroad Line and is 6.7 kilometers from the terminus of the line at Kurosaki Station.

== Station layout ==
The station consists of two side platforms connected by a level crossing. The station is unattended.

== Platforms ==
1	■ Chikuhō Electric Railroad Line	for Chikuhō-Nōgata
2	■ Chikuhō Electric Railroad Line	for Kurosaki-Ekimae

== Adjacent stations ==
←	Service	→
Chikuhō Electric Railroad Line
Nishiyama	Local	Higashi-Nakama

== History ==
The station opened on 27 December 1964.

== Passenger statistics ==
In fiscal 2021, the station was used by 1252 passengers daily.

== Surrounding area ==
- Chikuhō Electric Railroad Head Office
- Shinnakama Hospital
- Nakama City Hospital
- Taga Shrine

== See also ==
- List of railway stations in Japan
