= Hagiwara Station (Fukuoka) =

Railway station in Kitakyushu, Fukuoka prefecture, Japan

Hagiwara Station 萩原駅
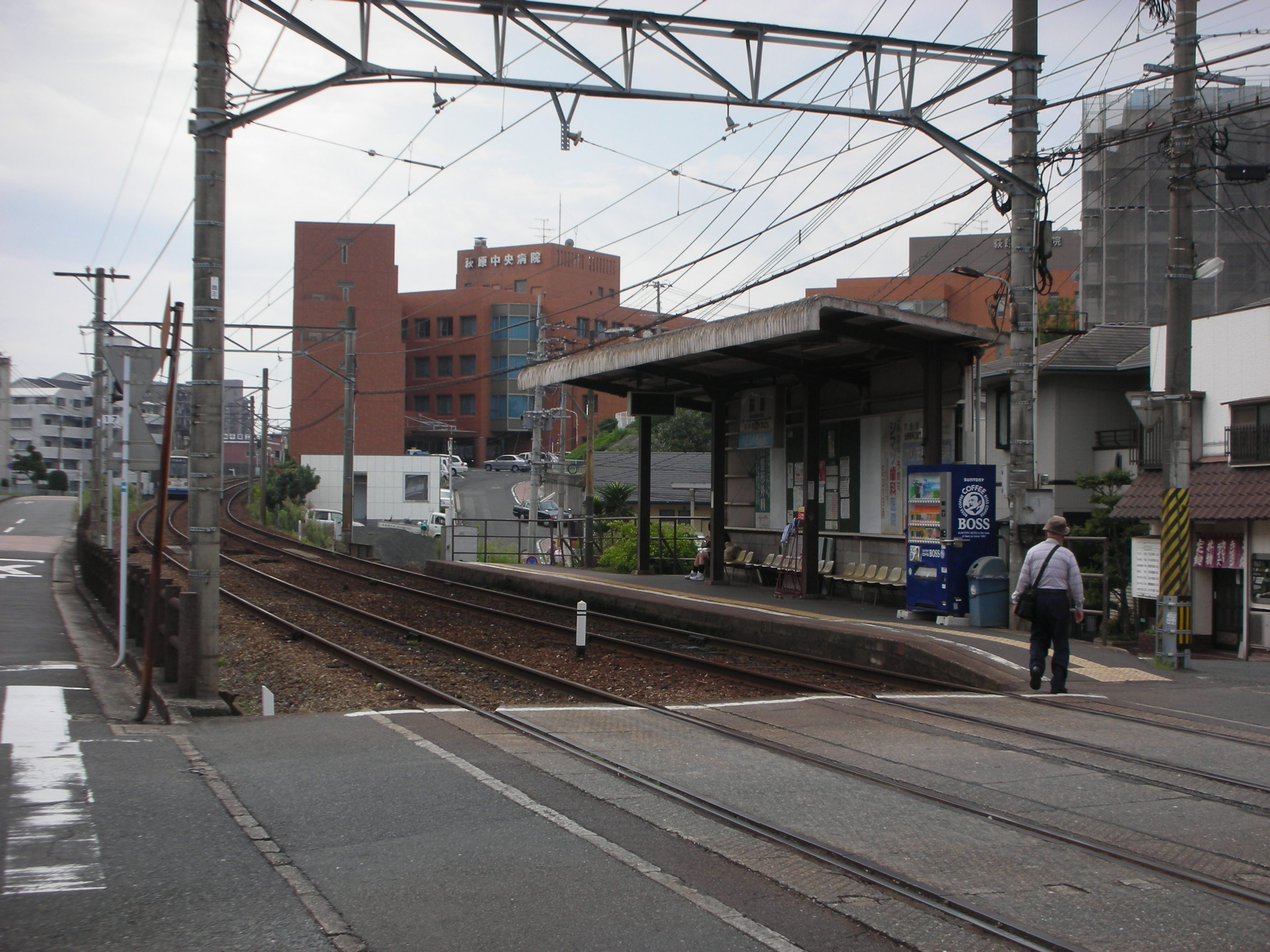
- Hagiwara Station platform

General information
- Location: 2-chōme-1 Hagiwara, Yahatanishi-ku, Kitakyushu-shi, Fukuoka-ken 806-0059; Japan
- Coordinates: 33°51′42.07″N 130°44′58.5″E
- Operator: Chikuhō Electric Railroad
- Line: ■ Chikuhō Electric Railroad Line
- Platforms: 2 side platforms

Other information
- Station code: CK 04
- Website: Official website

History
- Opened: 25 August 1963

Passengers
- FY2021: 823
Location
- Location within Fukuoka Prefecture Location within Japan

Hagiwara Station (萩原駅, Hagiwara-eki) is a passenger railway station located in Yahatanishi-ku, Kitakyūshū. It is operated by the private transportation company Chikuhō Electric Railroad (Chikutetsu), and has station number CK04.

== Lines ==
The station is served by the Chikuhō Electric Railroad Line and is 1.7 kilometers from the terminus of the line at Kurosaki Station.

== Station layout ==
The station consists of two side platforms connected by a level crossing. The station is unattended.

== Platforms ==
1	■ Chikuhō Electric Railroad Line	for Chikuhō-Nōgata
2	■ Chikuhō Electric Railroad Line	for Kurosaki

== Adjacent stations ==
←	Service	→
Chikuhō Electric Railroad Line
Kumanishi	Local	Anō

== History ==
The station opened on 25 August 1963.

== Passenger statistics ==
In fiscal 2021, the station was used by 823 passengers daily.

== Surrounding area ==
- Hagiwara Central Hospital
- Kitakyushu City Aoyama Elementary School

== See also ==
- List of railway stations in Japan
