= Kibōgaoka-Kōkōmae Station =

Railway station in Nakama, Fukuoka prefecture, Japan

Kibōgaoka-Kōkōmae Station 希望が丘高校前駅
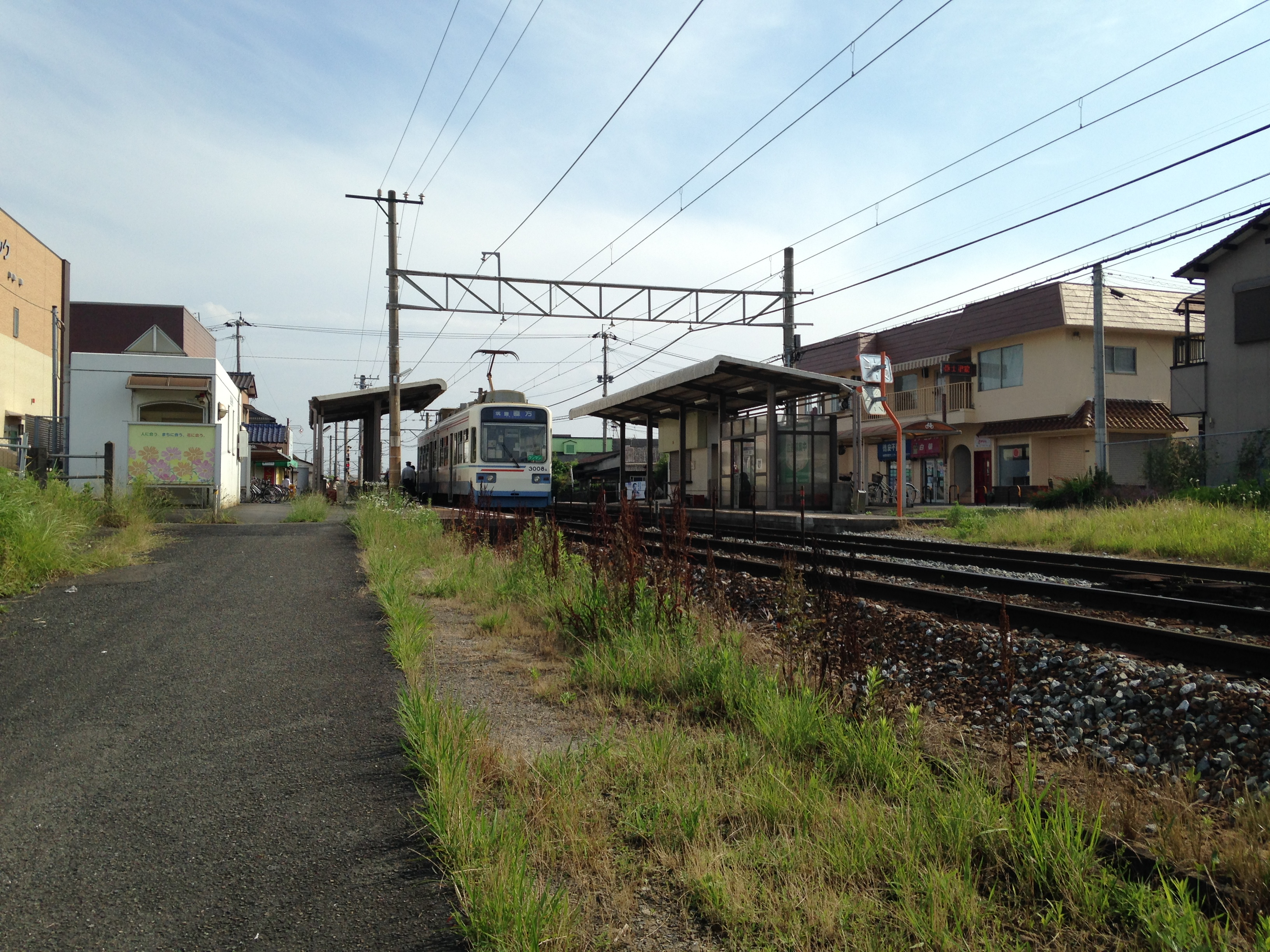
- Kibōgaoka-Kōkōmae Station platform

General information
- Location: 2 Chome-26-16 Dotenouchi, Nakama-shi, Fukuoka-ken; Japan
- Coordinates: 33°48′31.52″N 130°42′41.38″E
- Operator: Chikuhō Electric Railroad
- Line: ■ Chikuhō Electric Railroad Line
- Platforms: 2 side platform

Other information
- Station code: CK 14
- Website: Official website

History
- Opened: 29 April 1958

Passengers
- FY2020: 590
Location
- Location within Fukuoka Prefecture Location within Japan

Kibōgaoka-Kōkōmae Station (希望が丘高校前駅, Kibōgaoka-kōkōmae-eki) is a passenger railway station located in the city of Nakama, Fukuoka. It is operated by the private transportation company Chikuhō Electric Railroad (Chikutetsu), and has station number CK14.

== Lines ==
The station is served by the Chikuhō Electric Railroad Line and is 8.8 kilometers from the terminus of the line at Kurosaki Station.

== Station layout ==
The station has two opposed side platforms. The station is unattended.

== Platforms ==
| 1 | ■ Chikuhō Electric Railroad Line | for Chikuhō-Nōgata |
| 2 | ■ Chikuhō Electric Railroad Line | for Kurosaki-Ekimae |

== Adjacent stations ==
| ← | Service | → |
Chikuhō Electric Railroad Line
| Chikuhō-Nakama | Local | Chikuhō-Katsuki |

== History ==
The station opened on 29 April 1958 as Dotenouchi Station (手ノ内駅). It was renamed to its present name on 1 October 2008.

== Passenger statistics ==
In fiscal 2020, the station was used by 590 passengers daily.

== Surrounding area ==
- Kibōgaoka High School
- Yawata Works Onga River water source pump room

== See also ==
- List of railway stations in Japan
