= Chikuhō-Nakama Station =

Railway station in Nakama, Fukuoka, Japan

Chikuhō-Nakama Station 筑豊中間駅
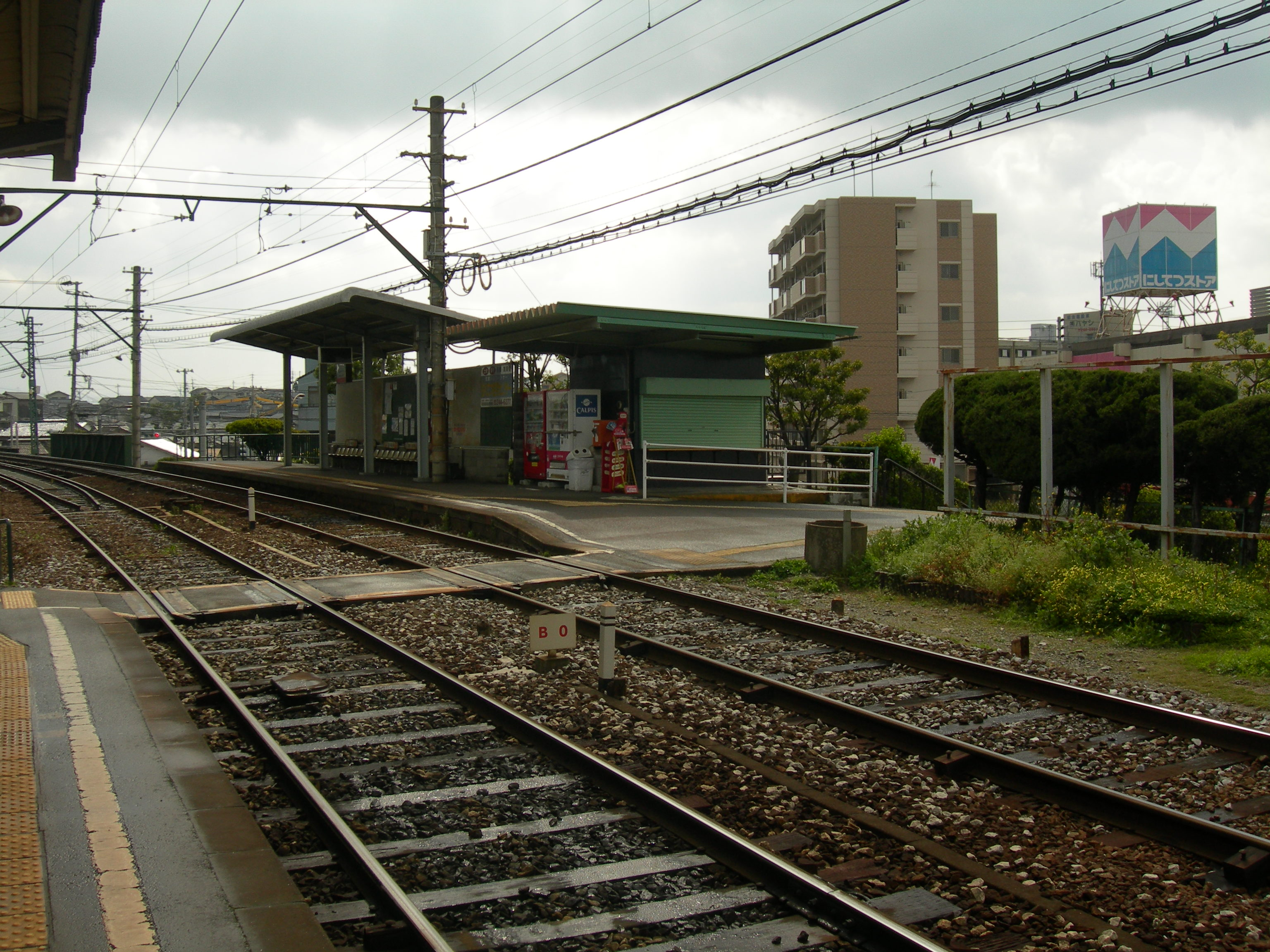
- Chikuhō-Nakama Station platform

General information
- Location: 1 Chome Higashinakama, Nakama-shi, Fukuoka-ken; Japan
- Coordinates: 33°48′59.73″N 130°42′59.75″E
- Operator: Chikuhō Electric Railroad
- Line: ■ Chikuhō Electric Railroad Line
- Platforms: 2 side platforms

Other information
- Station code: CK 13
- Website: Official website

History
- Opened: 21 March 1956

Passengers
- FY2022: 847
Location
- Location within Fukuoka Prefecture Location within Japan

Chikuhō-Nakama Station (筑豊中間駅, Chikuhō-hakama-eki) is a passenger railway station located in the city of Nakama, Fukuoka. It is operated by the private transportation company Chikuhō Electric Railroad (Chikutetsu), and has station number CK13.

== Lines ==
The station is served by the Chikuhō Electric Railroad Line and is 7.9 kilometers from the terminus of the line at Kurosaki Station.

== Station layout ==
The station has two opposed side platforms. The station is unattended.

== Platforms ==
1	■ Chikuhō Electric Railroad Line	for Chikuhō-Nōgata
2	■ Chikuhō Electric Railroad Line	for Kurosaki-Ekimae

== Adjacent stations ==
←	Service	→
Chikuhō Electric Railroad Line
Higashi-Nakama	Local	Kibōgaoka-Kōkōmae

== History ==
The station opened on 21 March 1956.

== Passenger statistics ==
In fiscal 2021, the station was used by 847 passengers daily.

== Surrounding area ==
- Nakamahigashi Elementary School
- Nakama City Office
- Sōsha-gū Shrine

== See also ==
- List of railway stations in Japan
