= Hagiwara =

Hagiwara (written: 萩原) is a Japanese surname. Notable people with the surname include:

- Kenichi Hagiwara (萩原 健一, 1950–2019) (also known as Sho-Ken), the lead singer of The Tempters
- Mai Hagiwara (萩原 舞, born 1996), Japanese pop singer
- Makoto Hagiwara (萩原 眞, 1854–1925), San Francisco landscape designer often credited with inventing the fortune cookie
- Masato Hagiwara (萩原 聖人, born 1971), Japanese actor
- Mikiko Hagiwara (萩原 美樹子, born 1970), Japanese women's basketball player
- Nagare Hagiwara (萩原 流行, 1953–2015), Japanese actor
- Sakutarō Hagiwara (萩原 朔太郎, 1886–1942), Japanese writer
- Yutaka Hagiwara (萩原 寛, born 1986) (also known as Kisenosato or Nishonoseki), 72nd yokozuna of professional sumo

== See also ==
- Hagiwara Solutions, Japanese manufacturer of solid state mass-storage devices
- Hagiwara Station (disambiguation), multiple railway stations in Japan
