= Higashi-Nakama Station =

Railway station in Nakama, Fukuoka prefecture, Japan

Higashi-Nakama Station 東中間駅
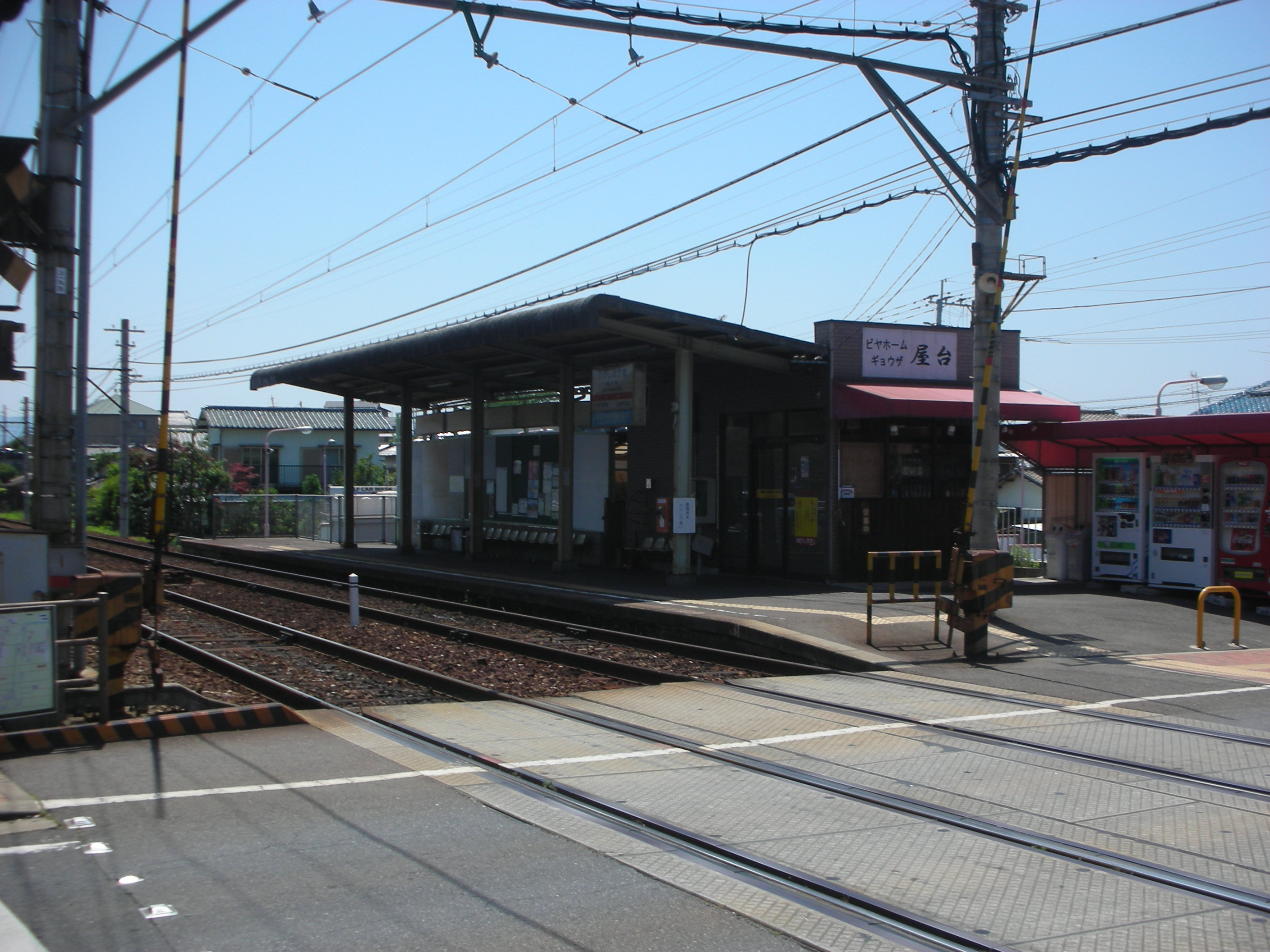
- Higashi-Nakama Station platform

General information
- Location: 3 Chome Higashinakama, Nakama-shi, Fukuoka-ken; Japan
- Coordinates: 33°49′12.06″N 130°43′16.48″E
- Operator: Chikuhō Electric Railroad
- Line: ■ Chikuhō Electric Railroad Line
- Platforms: 2 side platforms

Other information
- Station code: CK 12
- Website: Official website

History
- Opened: 15 October 1956

Passengers
- FY2022: 522
Location
- Location within Fukuoka Prefecture Location within Japan

Higashi-Nakama Station (東中間駅, Higashi-nakama-eki) is a passenger railway station located in the city of Nakama, Fukuoka. It is operated by the private transportation company Chikuhō Electric Railroad (Chikutetsu), and has station number CK12.

== Lines ==
The station is served by the Chikuhō Electric Railroad Line and is 7.2 kilometers from the terminus of the line at Kurosaki Station.

== Station layout ==
The station has two opposed side platforms. The station is unattended.

== Platforms ==
| 1 | ■ Chikuhō Electric Railroad Line | for Chikuhō-Nōgata |
| 2 | ■ Chikuhō Electric Railroad Line | for Kurosaki-Ekimae |

== Adjacent stations ==
| ← | Service | → |
Chikuhō Electric Railroad Line
| Tōritani | Local | Chikuhō-Nakama |

== History ==
The station opened on 15 October 1956.

== Passenger statistics ==
In fiscal 2021, the station was used by 552 passengers daily.

== Surrounding area ==
- Umeyasutenmangu Shrine

== See also ==
- List of railway stations in Japan
