= Kusubashi Station =

Railway station in Kitakyushu, Fukuoka prefecture, Japan

Kusubashi Station 楠橋駅
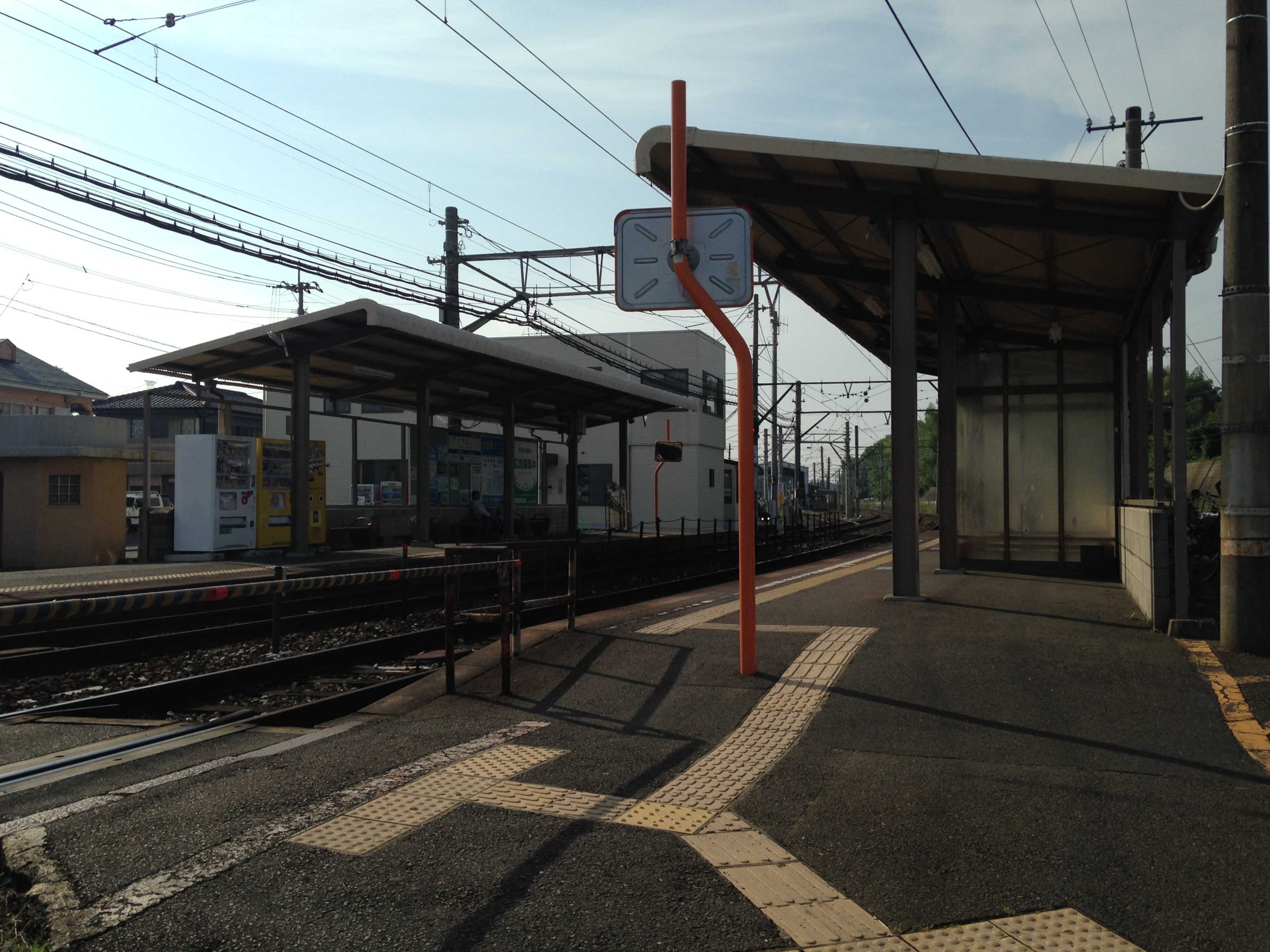
- Kusubashi Station platform

General information
- Location: 3 Chome Kusubashishimokata, Yahatanishi-ku, Kitakyūshū-shi, Fukuoka-ken 807-1146; Japan
- Coordinates: 33°47′21.01″N 130°43′28.77″E
- Operator: Chikuhō Electric Railroad
- Line: ■ Chikuhō Electric Railroad Line
- Platforms: 2 side platforms

Other information
- Station code: CK 16
- Website: Official website

History
- Opened: 29 April 1958

Passengers
- FY2021: 395
Location
- Location within Fukuoka Prefecture Location within Japan

Kusubashi Station (楠橋駅, Kusubashi-eki) is a passenger railway station located in Yahatanishi-ku, Kitakyūshū. It is operated by the private transportation company Chikuhō Electric Railroad (Chikutetsu), and has station number CK16.

== Lines ==
The station is served by the Chikuhō Electric Railroad Line and is 11.5 kilometers from the terminus of the line at Kurosaki Station.

== Station layout ==
The station consists of two side platforms connected by a level crossing. The station is unattended.

== Platforms ==
1	■ Chikuhō Electric Railroad Line	for Chikuhō-Nōgata
2	■ Chikuhō Electric Railroad Line	for Kurosaki

== Adjacent stations ==
←	Service	→
Chikuhō Electric Railroad Line
Chikuhō-Katsuki	Local	Shin-Koyanose

== History ==
The station opened on 29 April 1958. It was also the location of the Chikuho Electric Railway's only depot, which opened in 1959. Initially, there were two tracks, but tracks 3 and 4 were added in 1962, and tracks 5 and 6 were added in 1976 . Track 5 was abolished around 2018 due to a decrease in the number of cars in service due to the scrapping of the 2000 series. The depot was responsible for train inspections and monthly vehicle inspections until closed in 1962, when these functions were transferred to the Nishitetsu Sunatsu factory.

== Passenger statistics ==
In fiscal 2021, the station was used by 395 passengers daily.

== Surrounding area ==
- Senpukuji Temple
- Kusubashi Park
- Sasao Park
- Fukuoka Prefectural Route 280

== See also ==
- List of railway stations in Japan
