= Ganda Station =

Railway station in Nōgata, Fukuoka prefecture, Japan

Ganda Station 感田駅
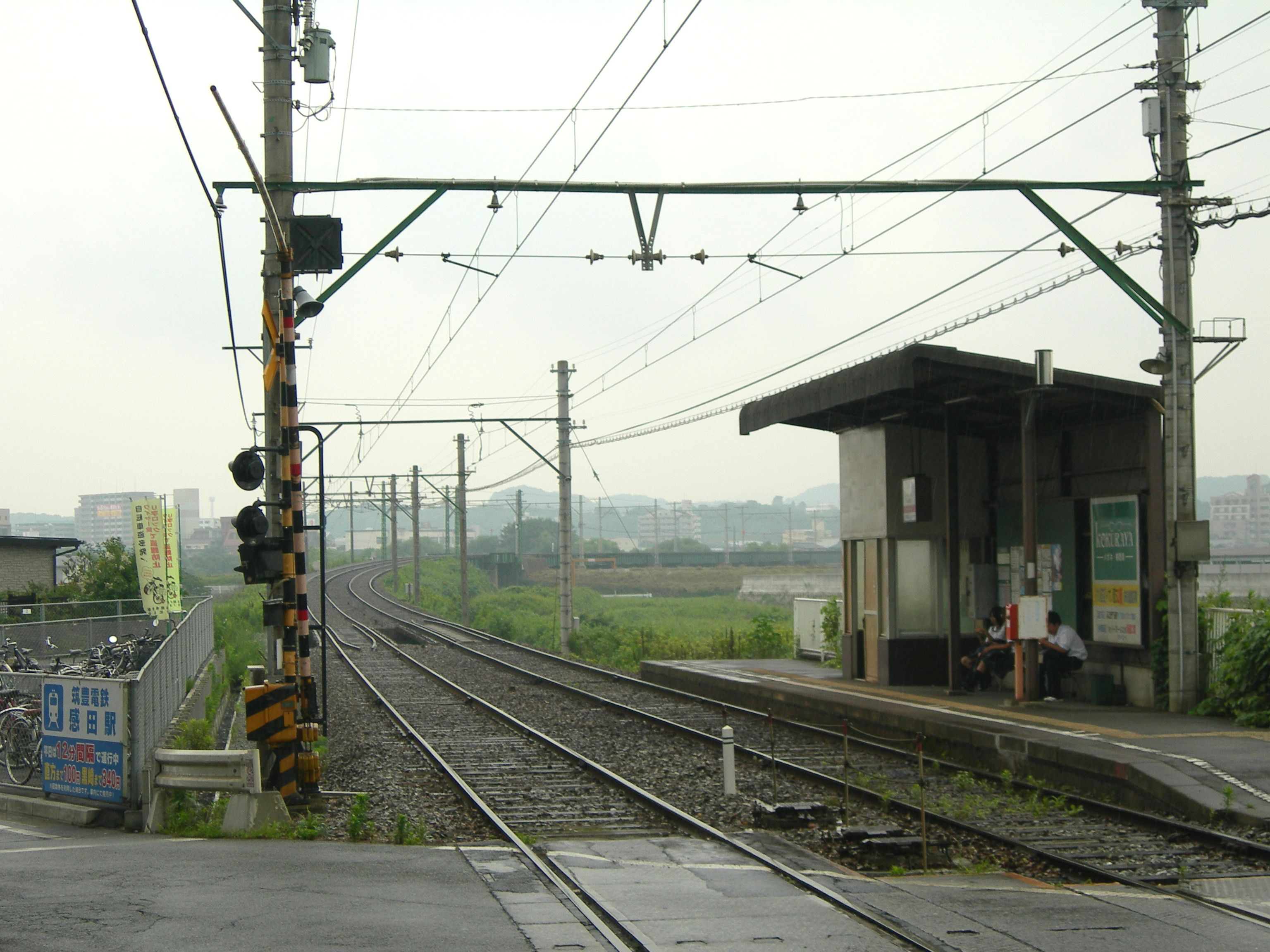
- Ganda Station platform

General information
- Location: 2971-2 Fuchijiri, Ganda, Nōgata-shi, Fukuoka-ken 822-0001; Japan
- Coordinates: 33°45′30.85″N 130°43′58.83″E
- Operator: Chikuhō Electric Railroad
- Line: ■ Chikuhō Electric Railroad Line
- Platforms: 1 side platform

Other information
- Station code: CK 20
- Website: Official website

History
- Opened: 18 September 1959

Passengers
- FY2022: 320
Location
- Location within Fukuoka Prefecture Location within Japan

Ganda Station (感田駅, Ganda-eki) is a passenger railway station located in the city of Nōgata, Fukuoka. It is operated by the private transportation company Chikuhō Electric Railroad (Chikutetsu), and has station number CK20.

== Lines ==
The station is served by the Chikuhō Electric Railroad Line and is 15.2 kilometers from the terminus of the line at Kurosaki Station.

== Station layout ==
The station has one side platform. There is no station building, but only a shelter on the platform. The station is unattended.

== Adjacent stations ==
←	Service	→
Chikuhō Electric Railroad Line
Ongano	Local	Chikuhō-Nōgata

== History ==
The station opened on 18 September 1959.

== Passenger statistics ==
In fiscal 2021, the station was used by 320 passengers daily.

== Surrounding area ==
- Nogata City Kanda Elementary School
- Nogata City Second Junior High School
- Japan National Route 200

== See also ==
- List of railway stations in Japan
