= Hagiwara Station =

Hagiwara Station is the name of multiple train stations in Japan.

- Hagiwara Station (Aichi)
- Hagiwara Station (Fukuoka)
