= Chikuhō Electric Railroad Line =

Light rail line in Kitakyushu, Japan

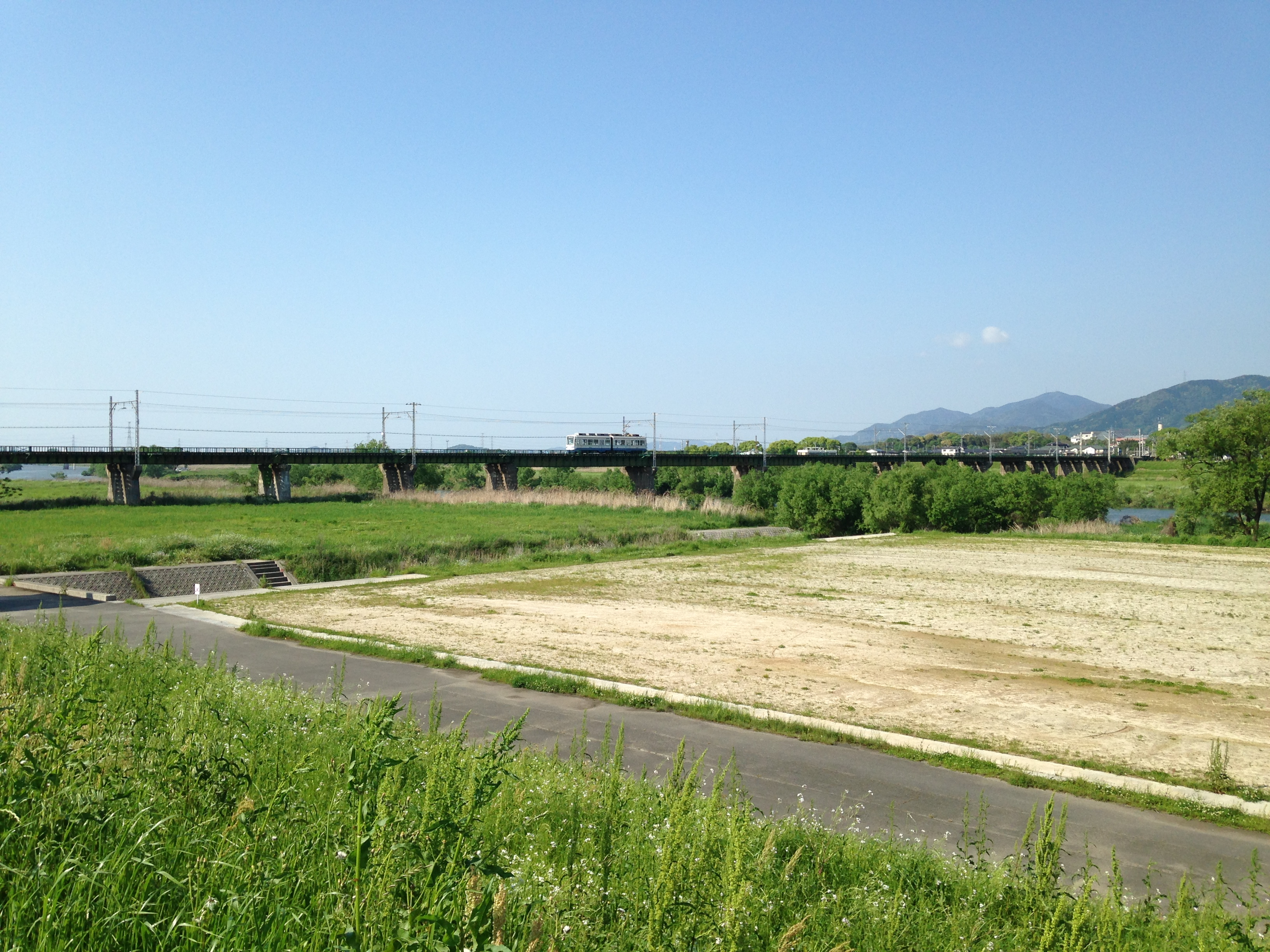
- A Chikutetsu 3000 series train on the Chikuho Railroad in April 2016

Overview
- Native name: 筑豊電気鉄道線
- Owner: Nishitetsu Group
- Locale: Fukuoka Prefecture
- Termini: Kurosaki; Chikuhō-Nōgata
- Stations: 21

Service
- Rolling stock: 3000 series; 5000 series

History
- Opened: March 21, 1956; 70 years ago

Technical
- Line length: 16.0 km (9.9 mi)
- Track gauge: 1,435 mm (4 ft 8 1/2 in)
- Minimum radius: 300 m
- Electrification: 600 V DC overhead lines
- Operating speed: 60 km/h (35 mph)

The Chikuhō Electric Railroad Line (筑豊電気鉄道線, Chikuhō Denki Tetsudō-sen) is a railway line in Fukuoka Prefecture, Japan, connecting Kurosaki-Ekimae in Kitakyushu with Chikuhō-Nōgata Station in Nōgata, operated by Chikuhō Electric Railroad (筑豊電気鉄道, Chikuhō Denki Tetsudō). The line does not have an official name. The company and the line are also called Chikutetsu (筑鉄). The company is a subsidiary of Nishi-Nippon Railroad (Nishitetsu), founded in 1951. The line originally had a through service with the Nishitetsu Kitakyushu Line, a tram line closed in 2000. Because of this, the Chikutetsu Line only uses tram vehicles. However, the line is legally classified as a railway under Railway Business Act, not a tramway under Tram Act, and the line does not share any segments with public roads.

== Station list ==
Code	Station name	Japanese	Distance (km) (between stations)	Total distance (km)	Transfers	Location
CK 01	Kurosaki-Ekimae	黒崎駅前	-	0.0	■ Kagoshima Main Line; ■ Fukuhoku Yutaka Line (Kurosaki Station)	Yahatanishi-ku, Kitakyushu
CK 02	Nishi-Kurosaki	西黒崎	0.2	0.2	Station temporarily closed on 1 October 2021 for approximately 4 years due to construction of the National Route 3 Kurosaki Bypass. As of April 2026, the station has not reopened.	Yahatanishi-ku, Kitakyushu
CK 03	Kumanishi	熊西	0.4	0.6		Yahatanishi-ku, Kitakyushu
CK 04	Hagiwara	萩原	1.1	1.7		Yahatanishi-ku, Kitakyushu
CK 05	Anō	穴生	0.6	2.3		Yahatanishi-ku, Kitakyushu
CK 06	Morishita	森下	0.5	2.8		Yahatanishi-ku, Kitakyushu
CK 07	Imaike	今池	0.9	3.7		Yahatanishi-ku, Kitakyushu
CK 08	Einomaru	永犬丸	0.8	4.5		Yahatanishi-ku, Kitakyushu
CK 09	Sangamori	三ヶ森	0.5	5.0		Yahatanishi-ku, Kitakyushu
CK 10	Nishiyama	西山	0.7	5.7		Yahatanishi-ku, Kitakyushu
CK 11	Tōritani	通谷	1.0	6.7		Nakama, Fukuoka
CK 12	Higashi-Nakama	東中間	0.5	7.2		Nakama, Fukuoka
CK 13	Chikuhō-Nakama	筑豊中間	0.7	7.9		Nakama, Fukuoka
CK 14	Kibōgaoka-Kōkōmae	希望が丘高校前	0.9	8.8		Nakama, Fukuoka
CK 15	Chikuhō-Katsuki	筑豊香月	1.4	10.2		Yahatanishi-ku, Kitakyushu
CK 16	Kusubashi	楠橋	1.3	11.5		Yahatanishi-ku, Kitakyushu
CK 17	Shin-Koyanose	新木屋瀬	0.6	12.1		Yahatanishi-ku, Kitakyushu
CK 18	Koyanose	木屋瀬	0.5	12.6		Yahatanishi-ku, Kitakyushu
CK 19	Ongano	遠賀野	1.3	13.9		Nōgata, Fukuoka
CK 20	Ganda	感田	1.3	15.2		Nōgata, Fukuoka
CK 21	Chikuhō-Nōgata	筑豊直方	0.8	16.0	Note: Nogata Station (Fukuhoku Yutaka Line) & Heisei Chikuhō Railway (Ita Line) is 750m away	Nōgata, Fukuoka

== Rolling stock ==
Chikuhō Electric Railroad operates the following fleet of tramcars.

- 3000 series 2-car articulated EMUs
- 5000 series 3-car articulated low-floor tramcars

=== 3000 series ===
Nine 3000 series sets were introduced between 1988 and 1996. As of 1 April 2017, all nine 3000 series sets were in operation, numbered 3001 to 3009. Many 3000 series received all-over advertising.

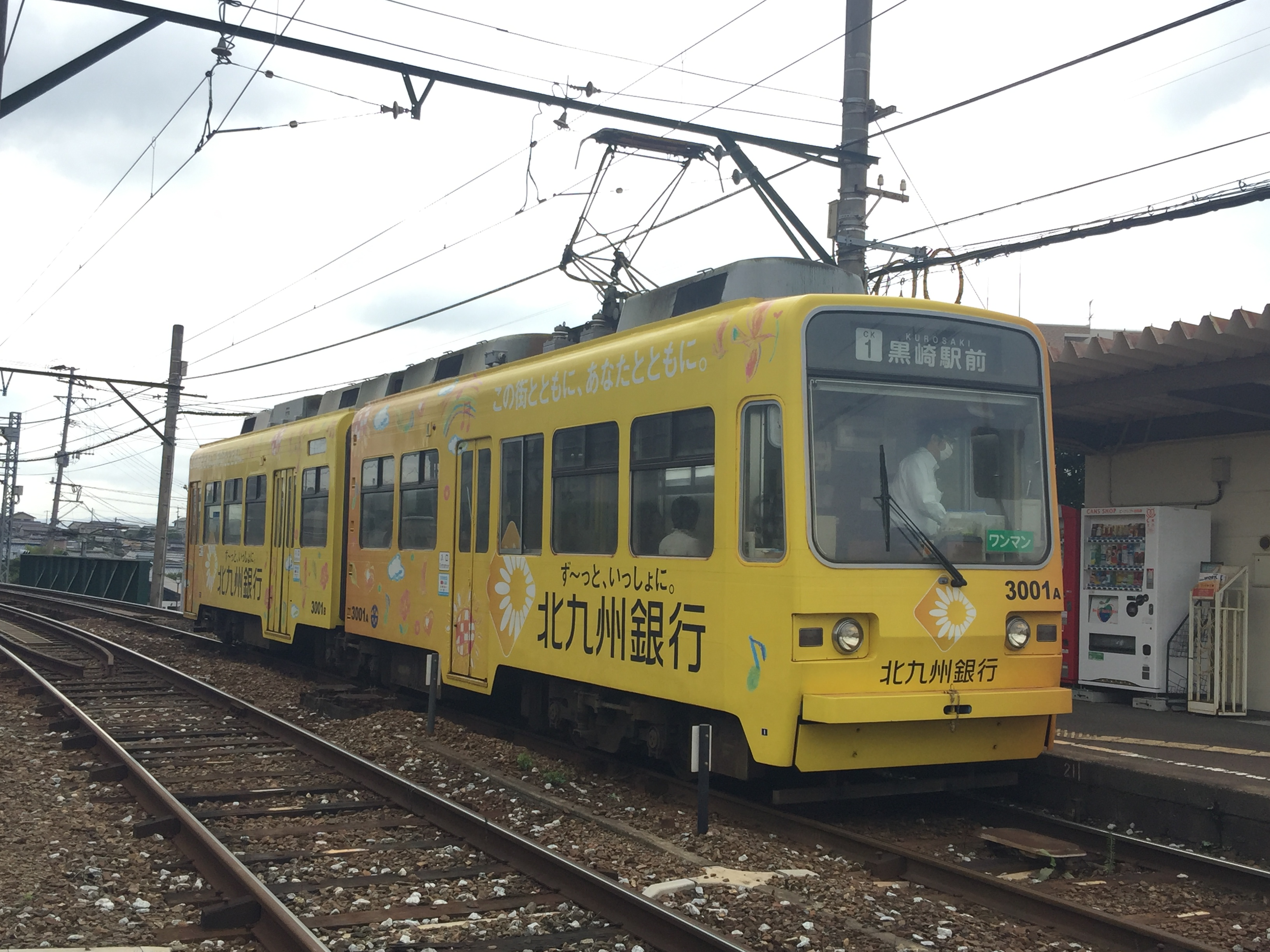
Set 3001 in September 2016

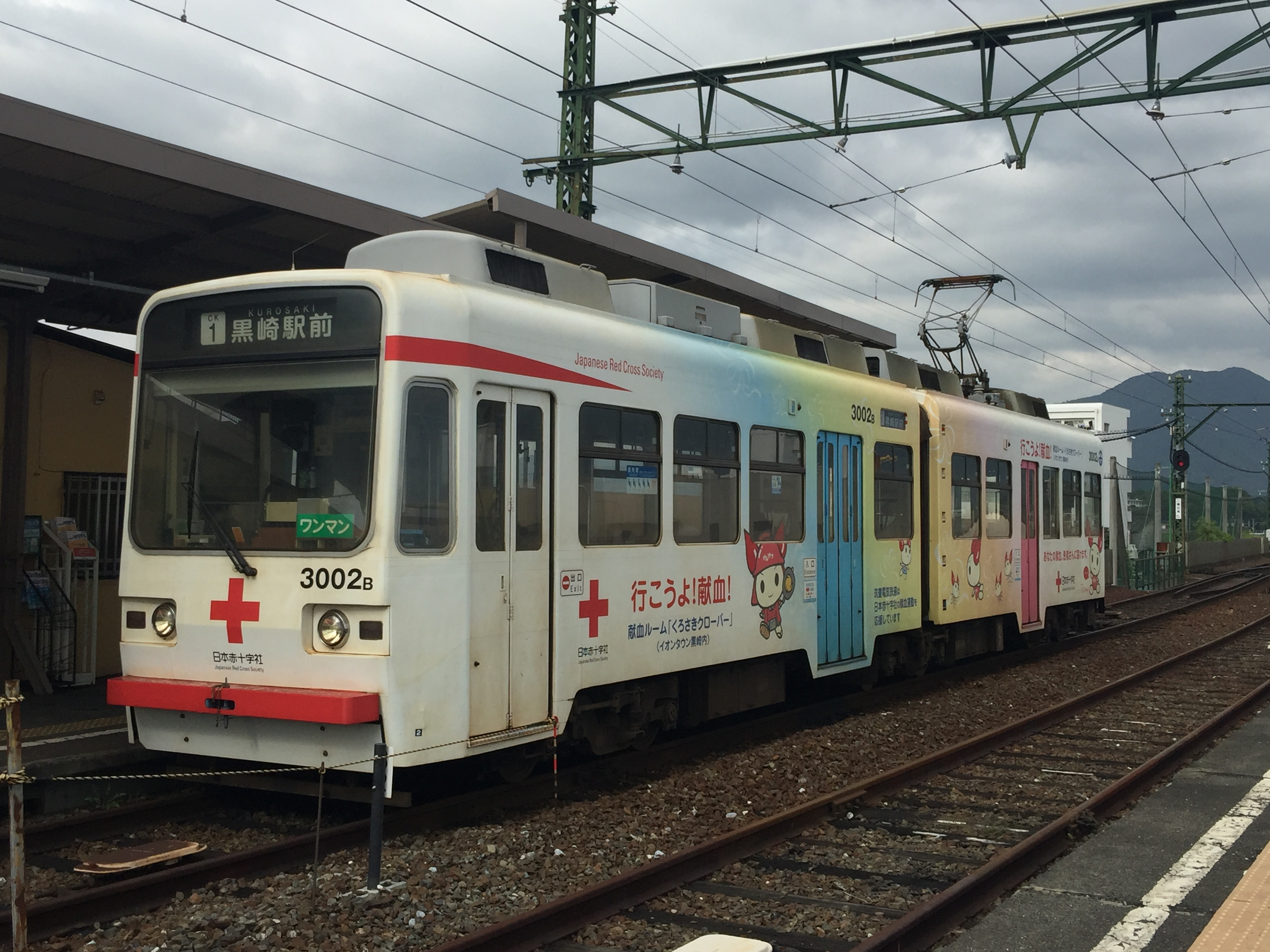
Set 3002 in September 2016

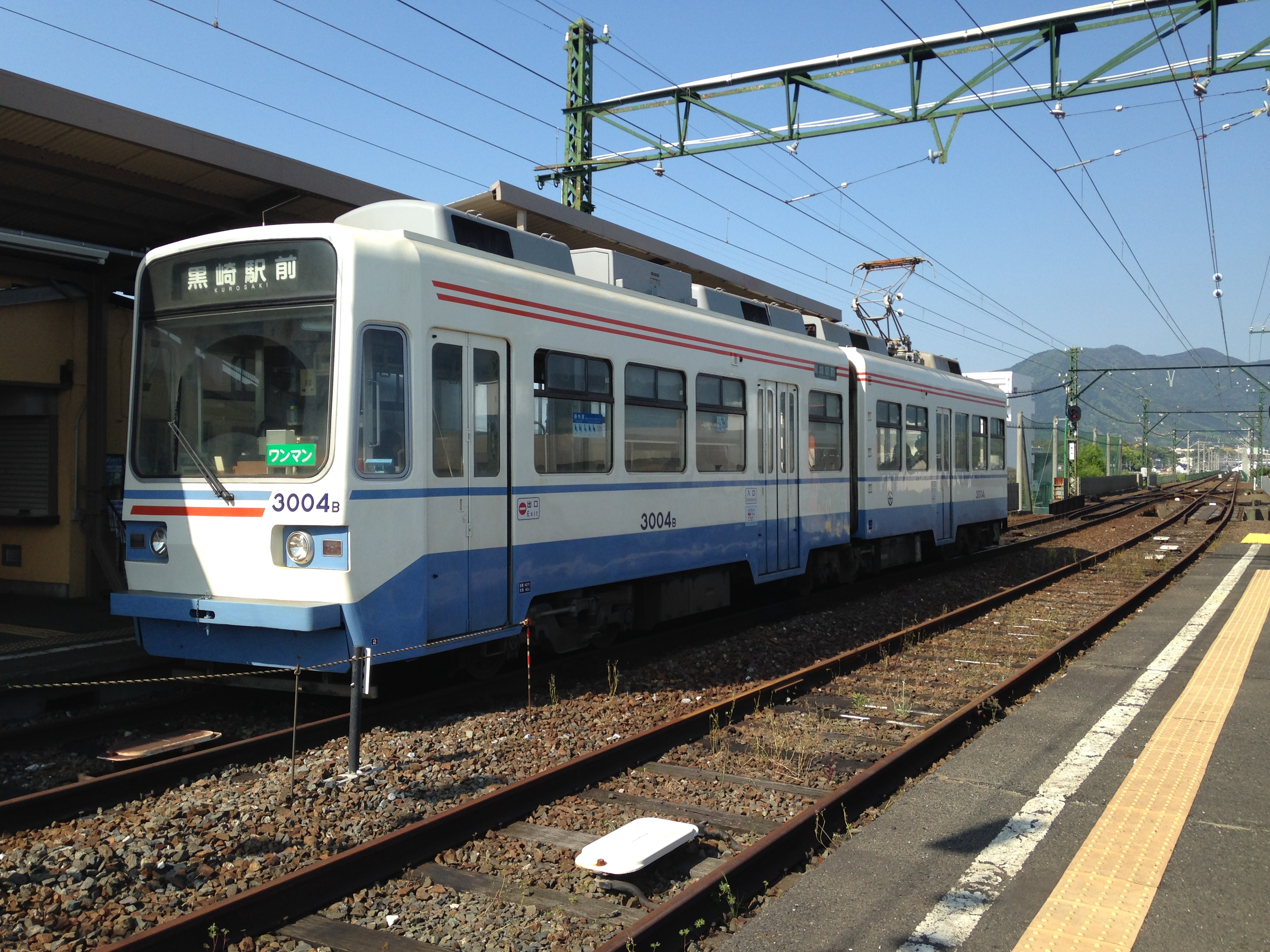
Set 3004 in April 2016

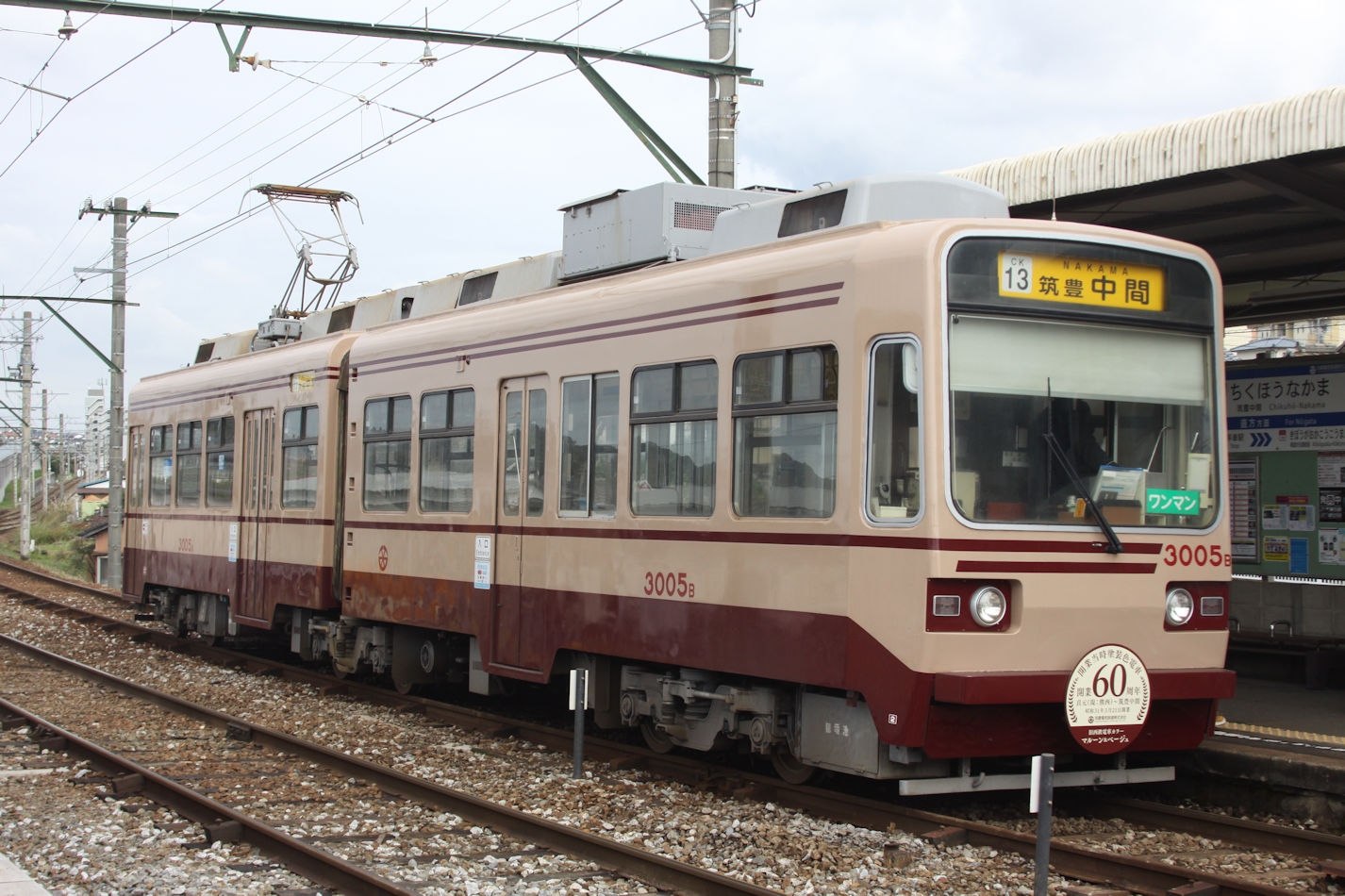
Set 3005 in old-style livery in November 2016

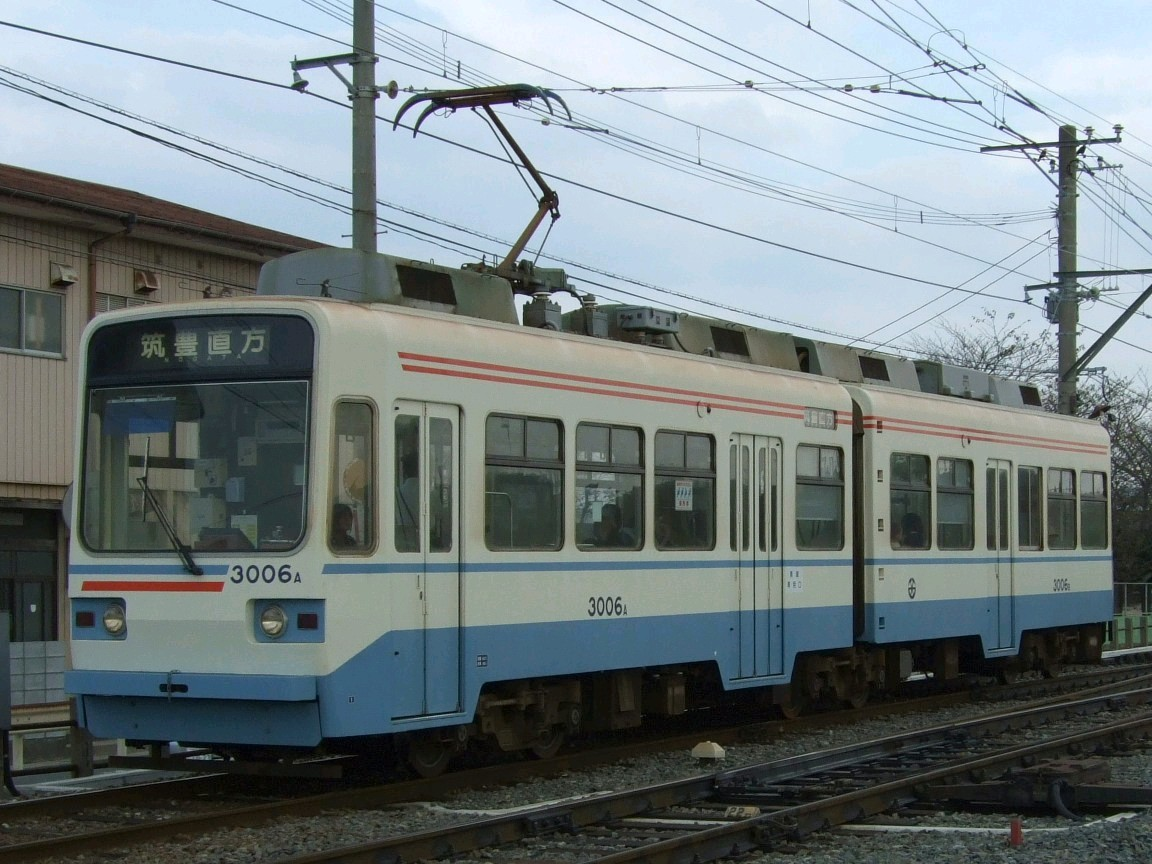
Set 3006 in October 2007

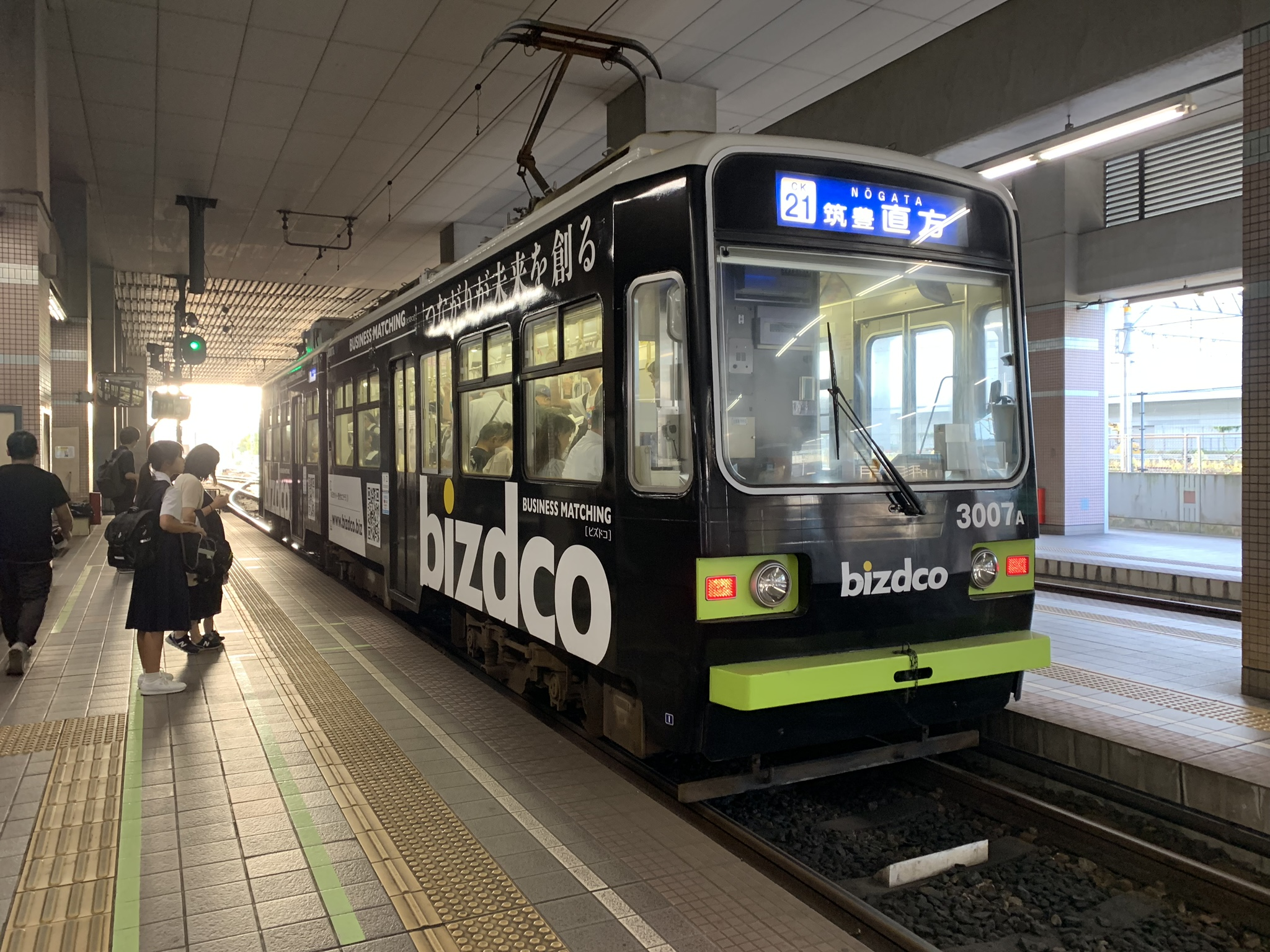
Set 3007 in September 2019

=== 5000 series ===
The 5000 series is a 17.6 m long low-floor tramcar type with three articulated units mounted on two bogies. As of 1 April 2017, three 5000 series sets were in operation, with a total of four sets scheduled to be in operation by March 2018.

Individual car histories are as follows.

Set No.	Manufacturer	Delivery date	Service entry date	Livery
5001	Alna Sharyo	February 2015	14 March 2015	Pink
5002	Alna Sharyo	February 2016	1 March 2016	Green
5003	Alna Sharyo	February 2017	13 February 2017	Pink
5004	Alna Sharyo	2017	18 December 2017	Light blue

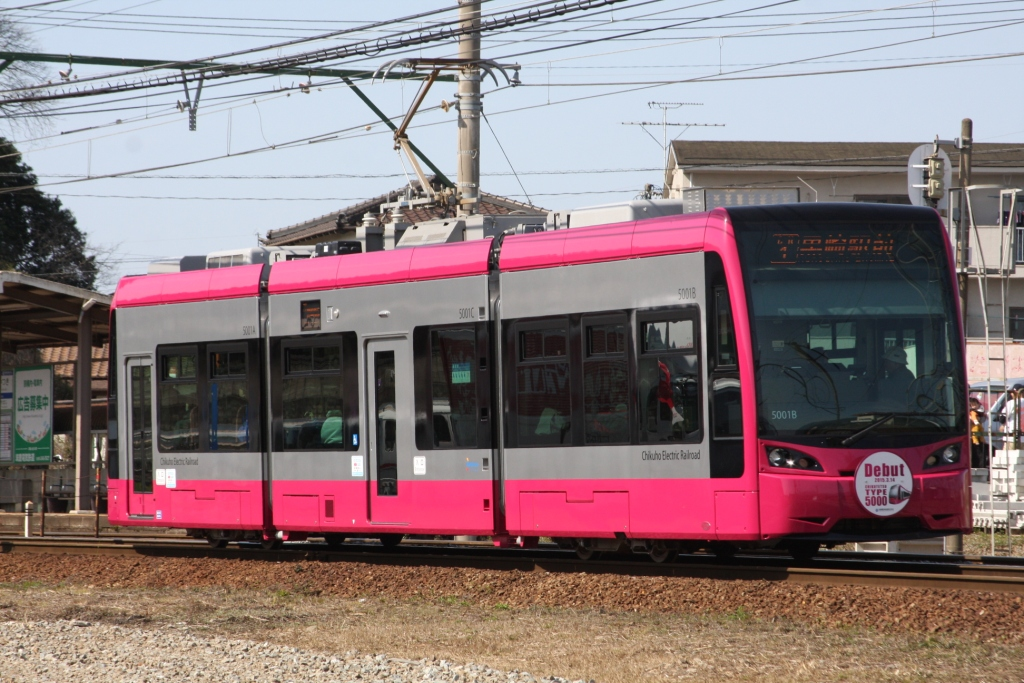
5001 in March 2015

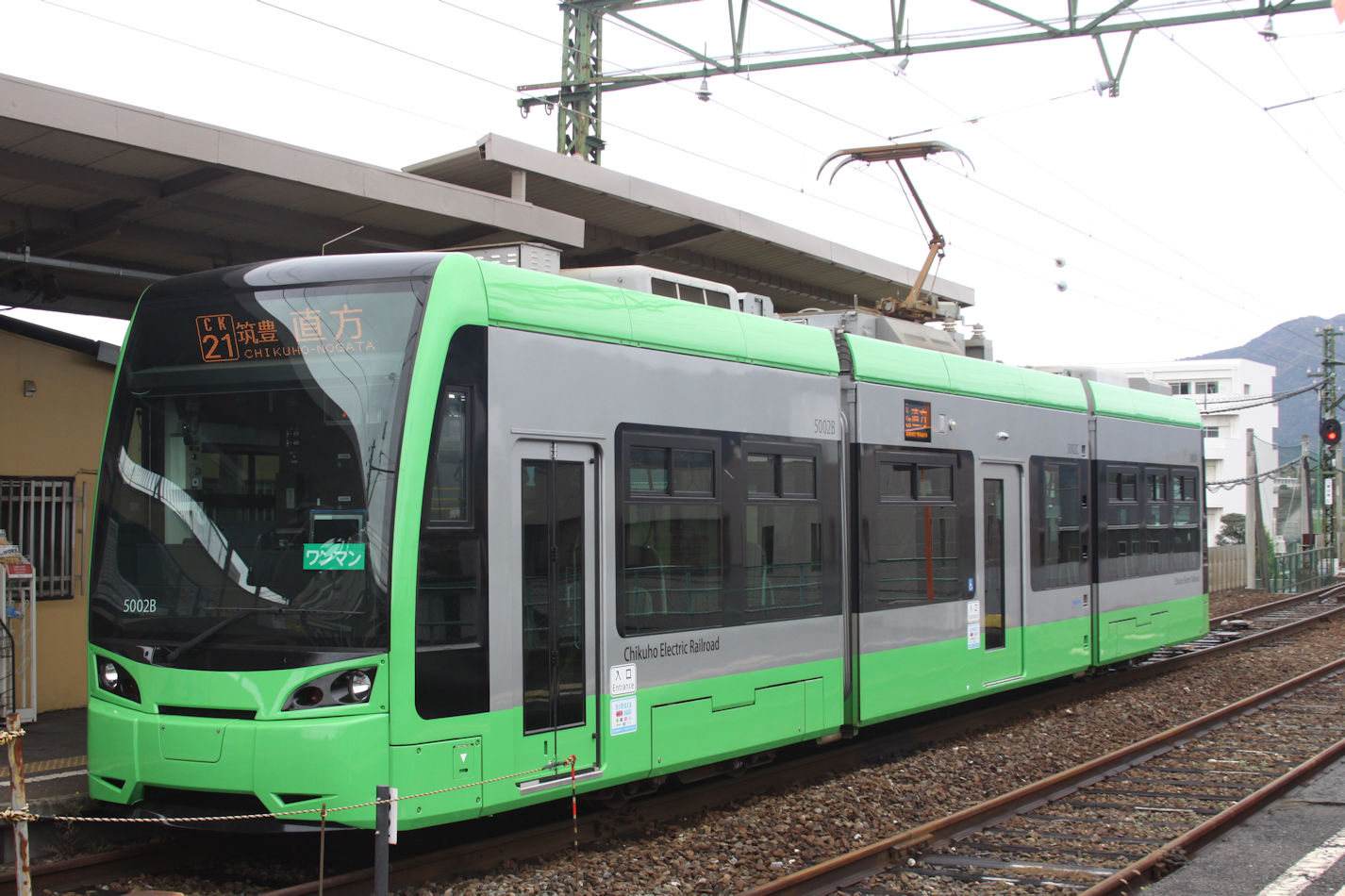
5002 in November 2016

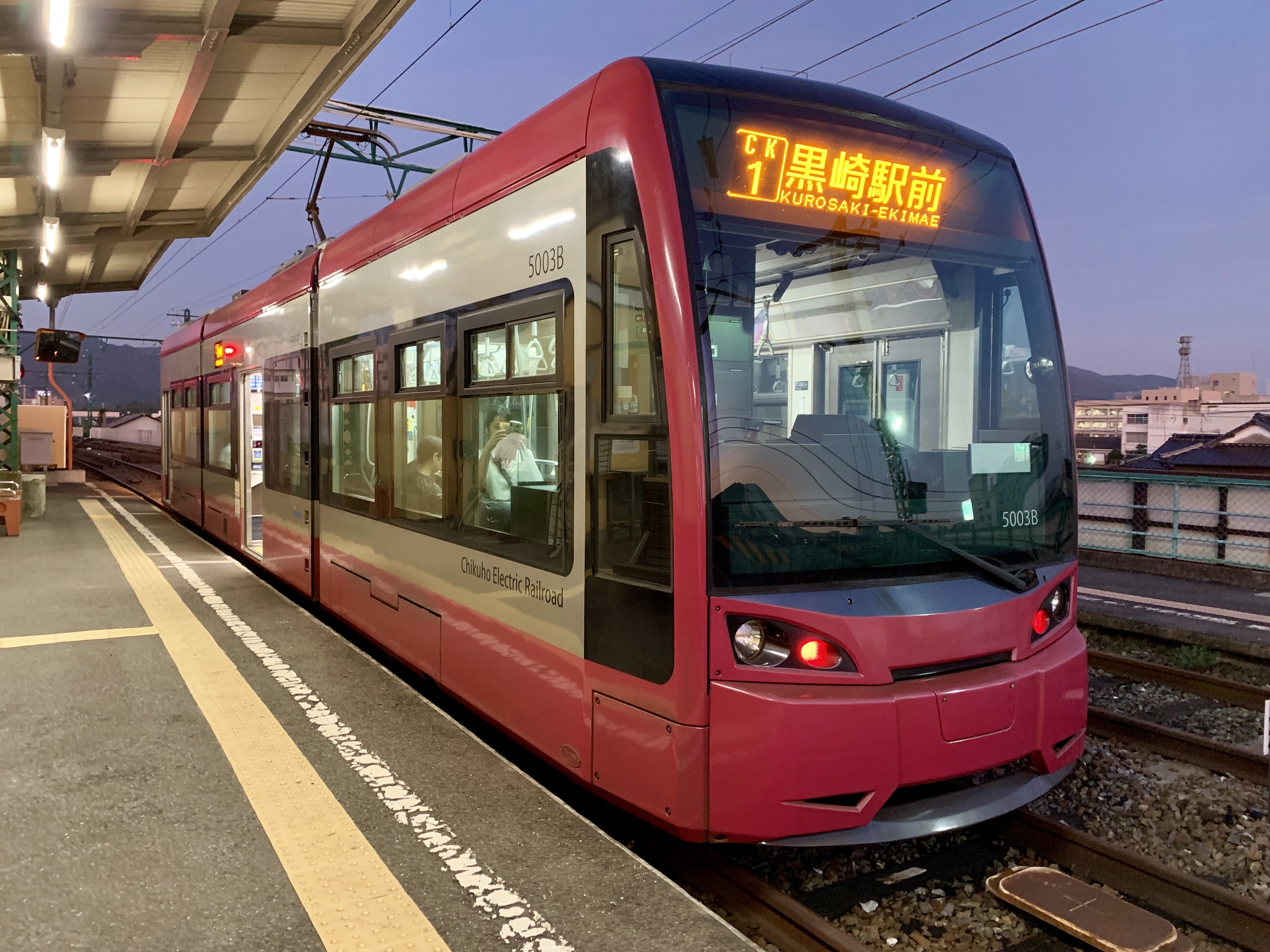
5003 in September 2019

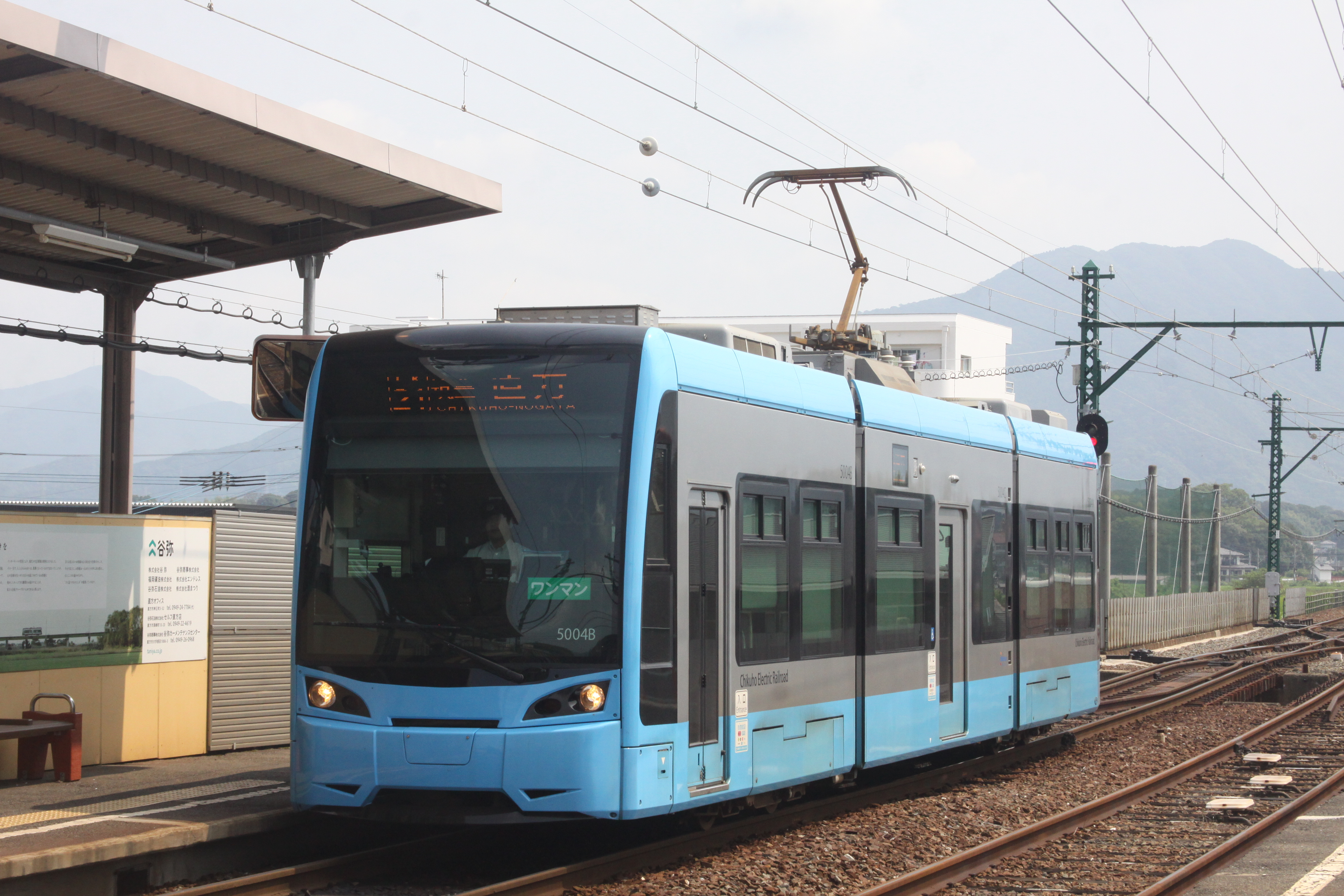
5004 in August 2018

=== Former rolling stock ===
- 2000 series 3-car articulated EMUs
- 2100 series two-car articulated EMUs

=== 2000 series ===
The 2000 series sets were purchased from Nishitetsu and rebuilt as three-car articulated units with four bogies.

As of 1 April 2017, three of the original seven 2000 series sets (2002, 2003, 2006) remained in operation. Each car was finished in a different colour livery as follows. The remaining 2000 series sets were decommissioned around November 2022.

Set No.	Livery	Notes
2001	Purple	Withdrawn
2002	Indigo	
2003	Blue	
2004	Green	Withdrawn
2005	Yellow	Withdrawn
2006	Orange	
2007	Red	Withdrawn

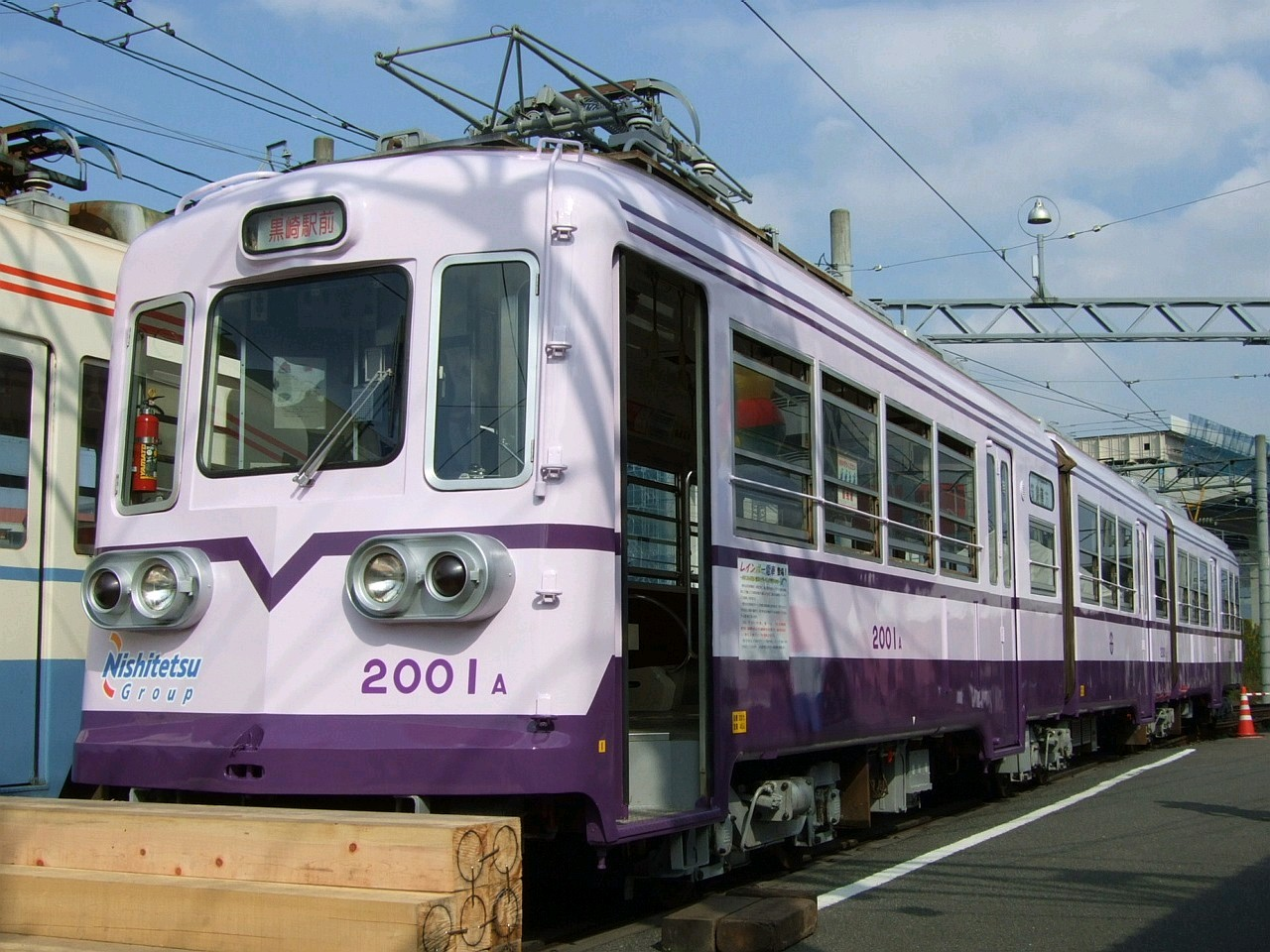
Purple-liveried set 2001 in October 2007

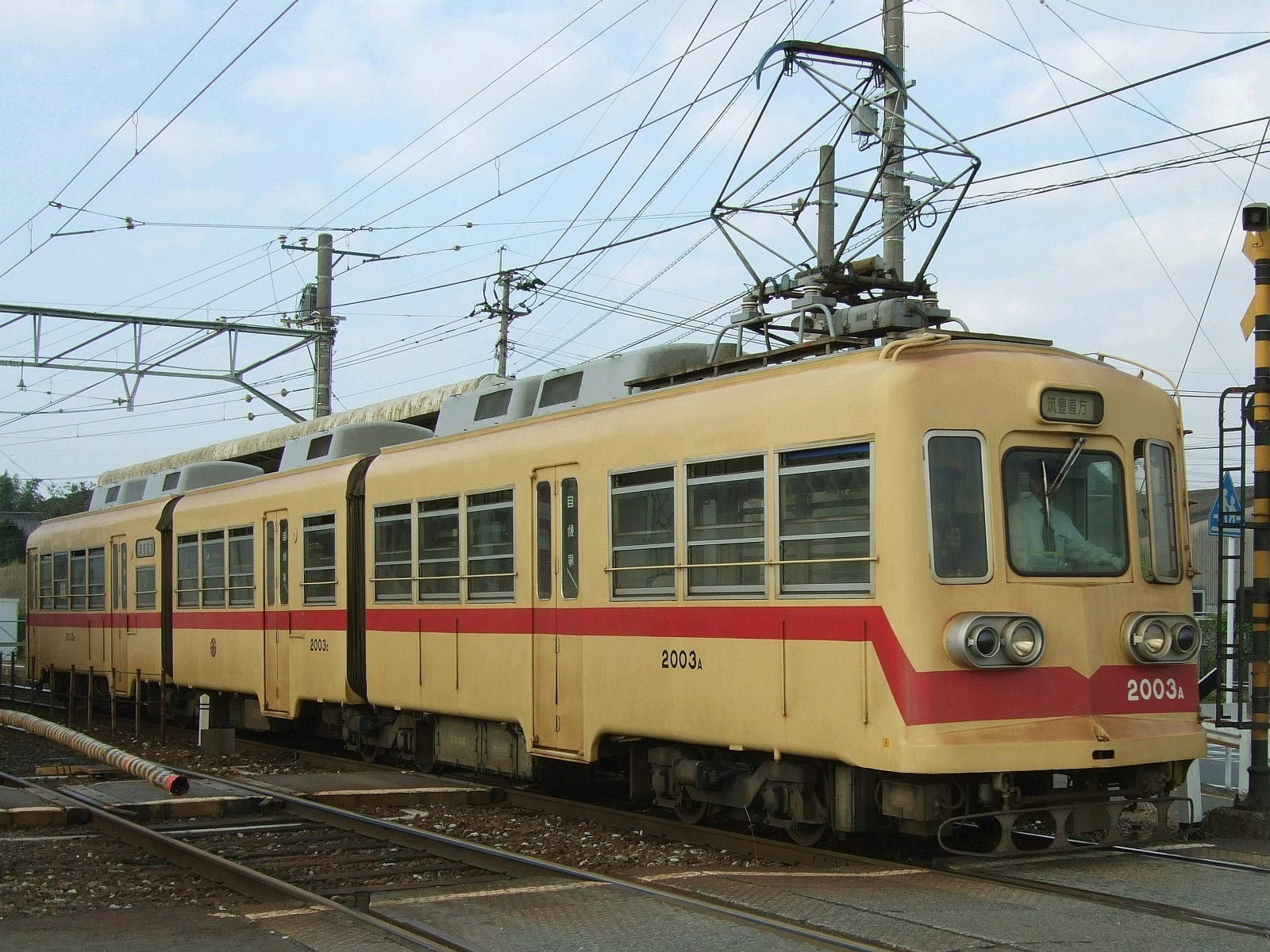
Set 2003 in original livery in October 2007

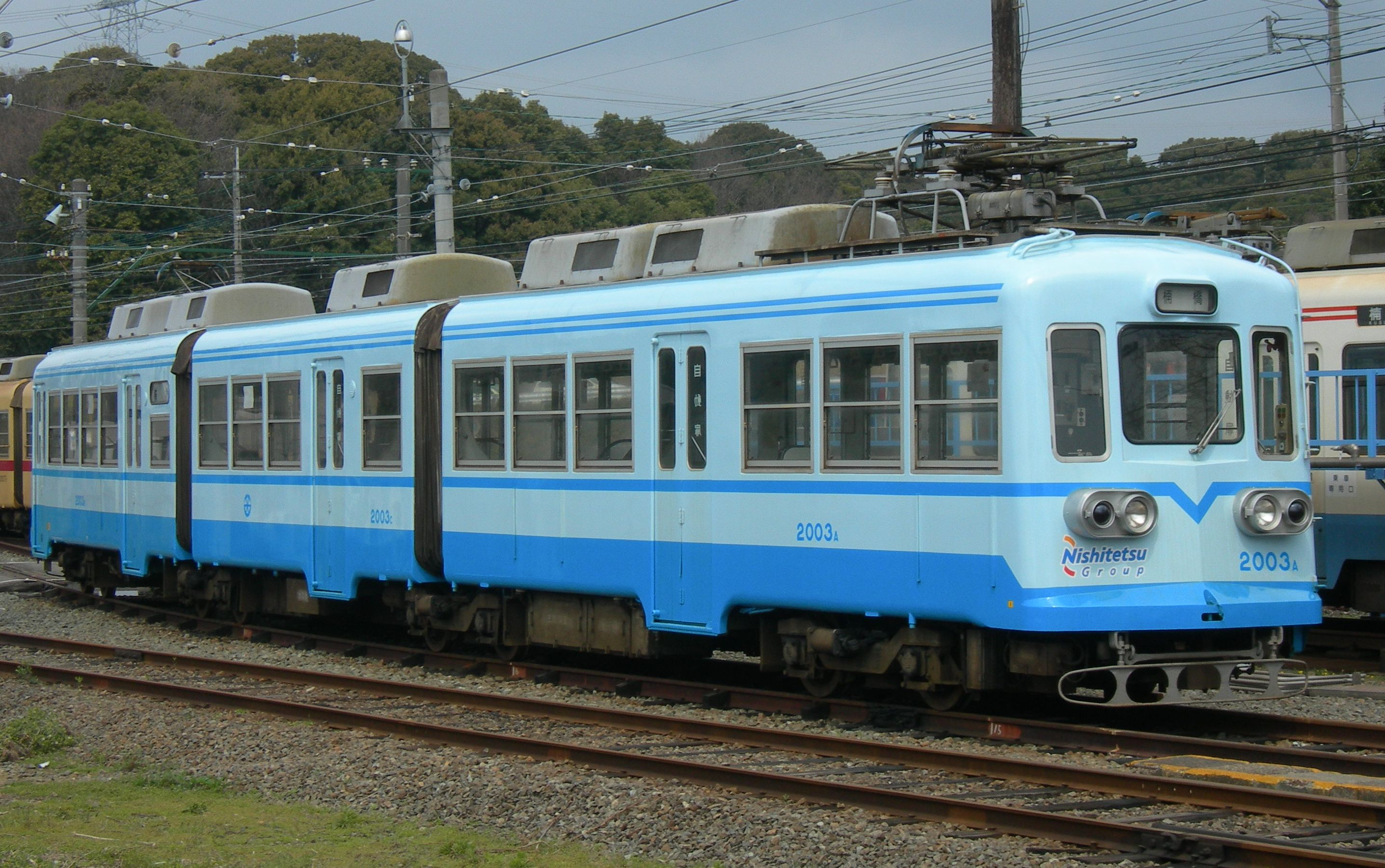
Blue-liveried set 2003 in March 2008

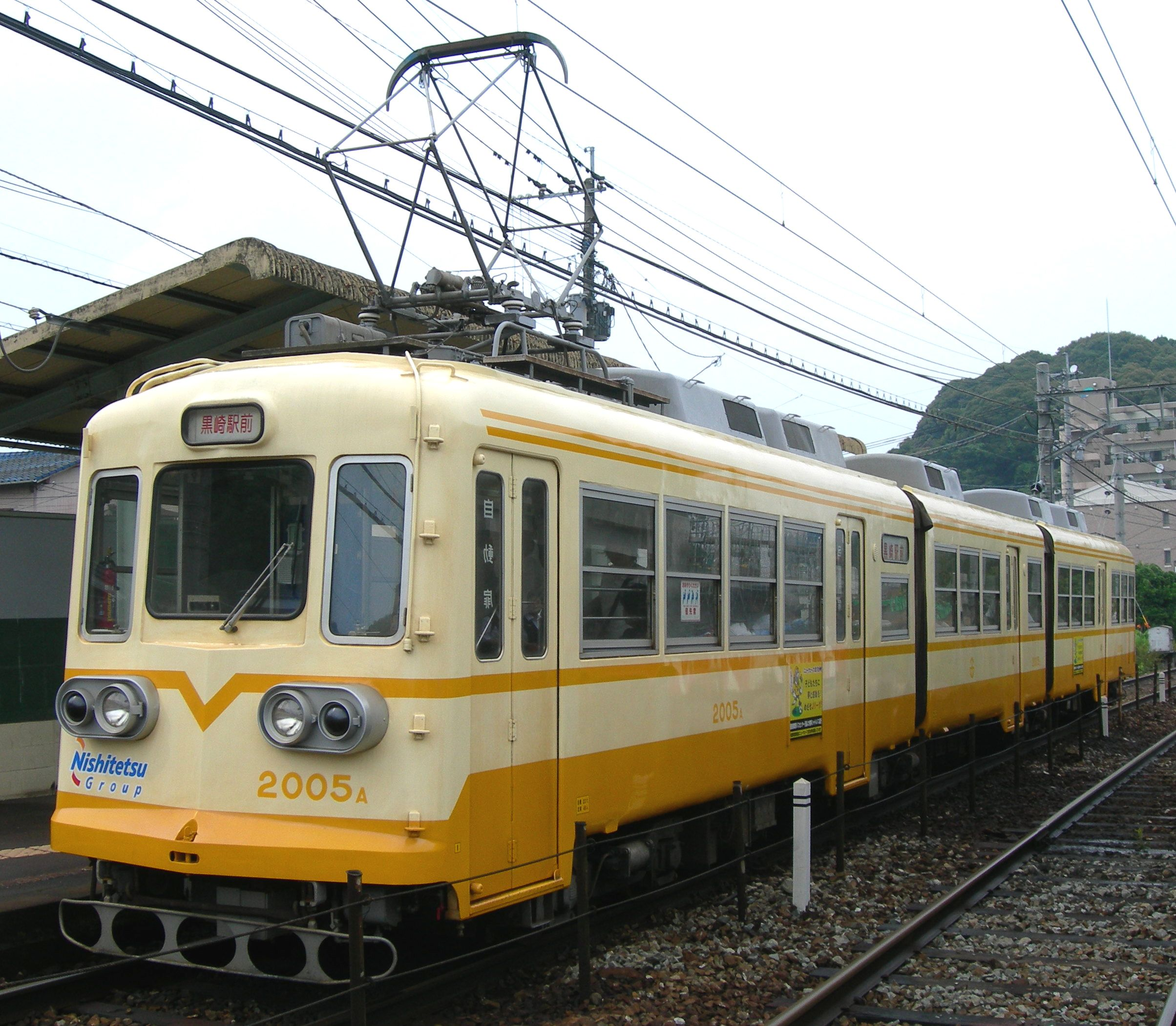
Yellow-liveried set 2005 in July 2009

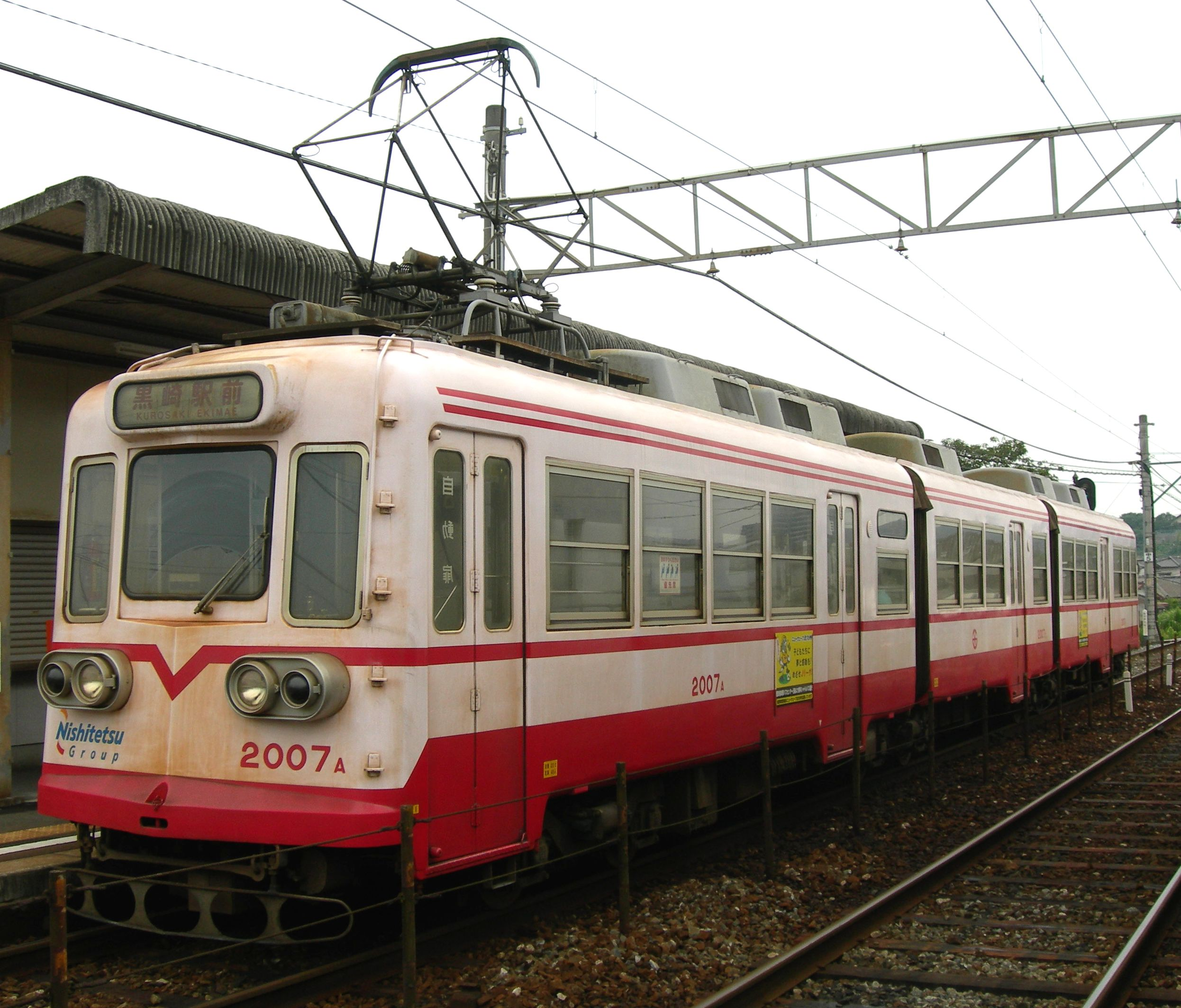
Red-liveried set 2007 in July 2009

=== 2100 series ===
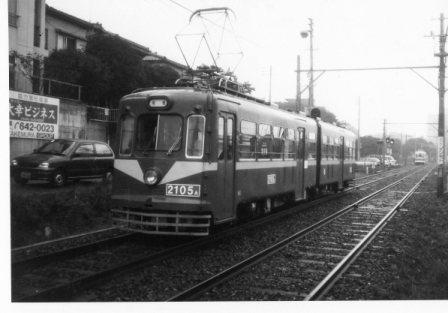
Set 2105 in 2000

== History ==
Chikuho Electric Railroad was founded 15 February 1951. The line opened on 21 March 1956, initially from Kumanishi to Chikuhō-Nakama. This was extended to Koyanose on 29 April 1958, and to Chikuhō-Nōgata on 18 September 1959.

Nishi-Kurosaki Station (CK02) was temporarily closed on 1 October 2021 for approximately 4 years due to construction of the National Route 3 Kurosaki Bypass. As of April 2026, the station has not reopened.

== See also ==
- List of railway companies in Japan
- List of railway lines in Japan
