= Yahatanishi-ku =

Ward of Kitakyūshū in Kyūshū, Japan

Coordinates: 33°51′41″N 130°45′37″E

Location of Yahatanishi-ku in Kitakyūshū

Yahatanishi-ku (八幡西区) is a ward of Kitakyūshū, Fukuoka, Japan. It covers 83.04 square kilometres, and had a population of 260,318 in January, 2005. The ward contains JR Kurosaki Station, and JR Orio Station on the Kagoshima Main Line. It is chiefly a residential area, bounded by the Onga river in the West.

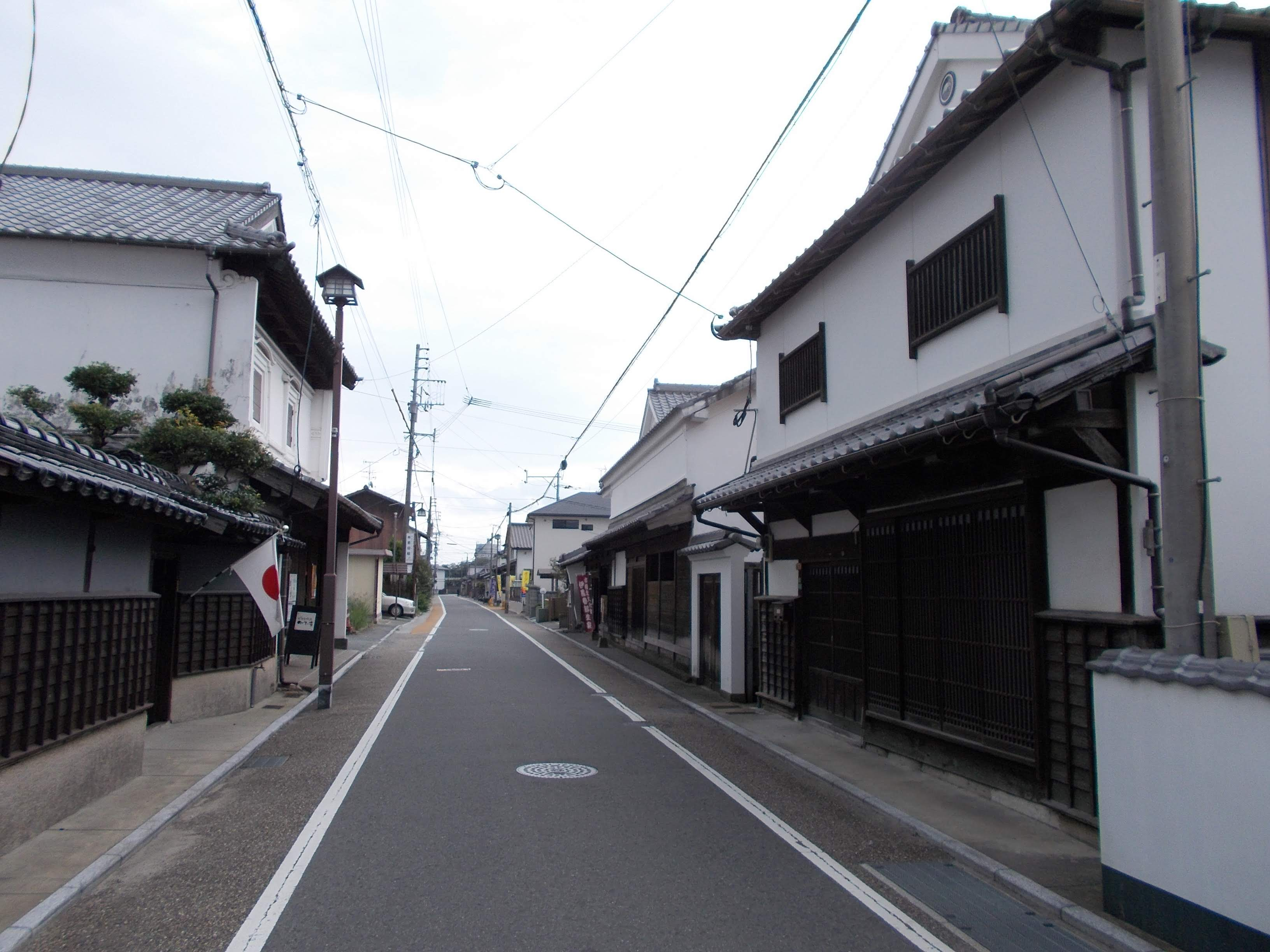
Koyanose-juku, a former post town on the Nagasaki Kaidō

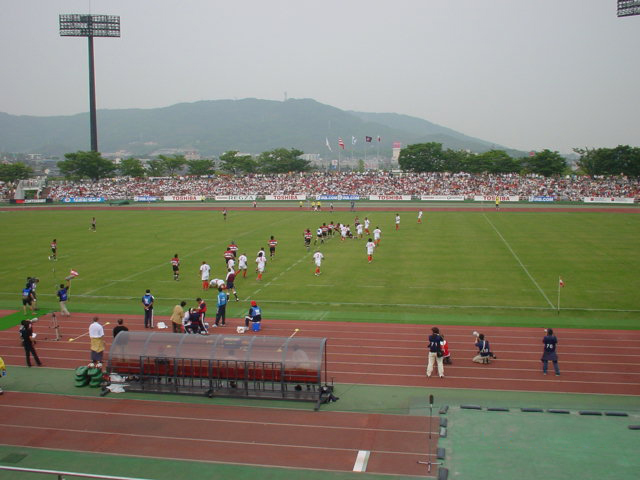
Rugby (Japan v Tonga) at Honjo on June 4, 2006

== Geography ==
=== Climate ===
Climate data for Yahatañishi-ku, Kitakyushu (1991−2020 normals, extremes 1977−present)
Month	Jan	Feb	Mar	Apr	May	Jun	Jul	Aug	Sep	Oct	Nov	Dec	Year
Record high °C (°F)	19.0 (66.2)	24.0 (75.2)	26.9 (80.4)	30.1 (86.2)	32.4 (90.3)	35.0 (95.0)	36.9 (98.4)	38.7 (101.7)	36.0 (96.8)	33.0 (91.4)	27.5 (81.5)	24.8 (76.6)	38.7 (101.7)
Mean daily maximum °C (°F)	9.8 (49.6)	10.9 (51.6)	14.4 (57.9)	19.6 (67.3)	24.2 (75.6)	27.0 (80.6)	30.7 (87.3)	31.9 (89.4)	28.1 (82.6)	23.2 (73.8)	17.7 (63.9)	12.2 (54.0)	20.8 (69.5)
Daily mean °C (°F)	6.2 (43.2)	6.9 (44.4)	10.0 (50.0)	14.7 (58.5)	19.3 (66.7)	22.7 (72.9)	26.8 (80.2)	27.8 (82.0)	24.0 (75.2)	18.8 (65.8)	13.3 (55.9)	8.3 (46.9)	16.6 (61.8)
Mean daily minimum °C (°F)	2.8 (37.0)	3.2 (37.8)	5.9 (42.6)	10.2 (50.4)	14.9 (58.8)	19.3 (66.7)	23.7 (74.7)	24.6 (76.3)	20.6 (69.1)	14.8 (58.6)	9.3 (48.7)	4.7 (40.5)	12.8 (55.1)
Record low °C (°F)	−4.6 (23.7)	−6.2 (20.8)	−3.8 (25.2)	0.5 (32.9)	6.4 (43.5)	10.5 (50.9)	15.4 (59.7)	17.6 (63.7)	8.9 (48.0)	3.5 (38.3)	0.7 (33.3)	−3.6 (25.5)	−6.2 (20.8)
Average precipitation mm (inches)	87.9 (3.46)	79.2 (3.12)	114.2 (4.50)	125.4 (4.94)	142.9 (5.63)	239.5 (9.43)	314.6 (12.39)	198.1 (7.80)	165.9 (6.53)	85.2 (3.35)	91.8 (3.61)	75.9 (2.99)	1,720.5 (67.74)
Average precipitation days (≥ 1.0 mm)	10.8	10.4	10.9	10.0	9.0	12.3	11.8	10.0	9.7	7.3	9.4	9.8	121.4
Mean monthly sunshine hours	101.8	113.2	159.5	188.6	205.0	139.2	167.6	196.2	159.8	170.5	131.5	102.9	1,835.7
Source: Japan Meteorological Agency

== Facilities ==
- Honjo Stadium
