= Chikuhō-Nōgata Station =

Railway station in Nōgata, Fukuoka, Japan

Chikuhō-Nōgata Station 筑豊直方駅
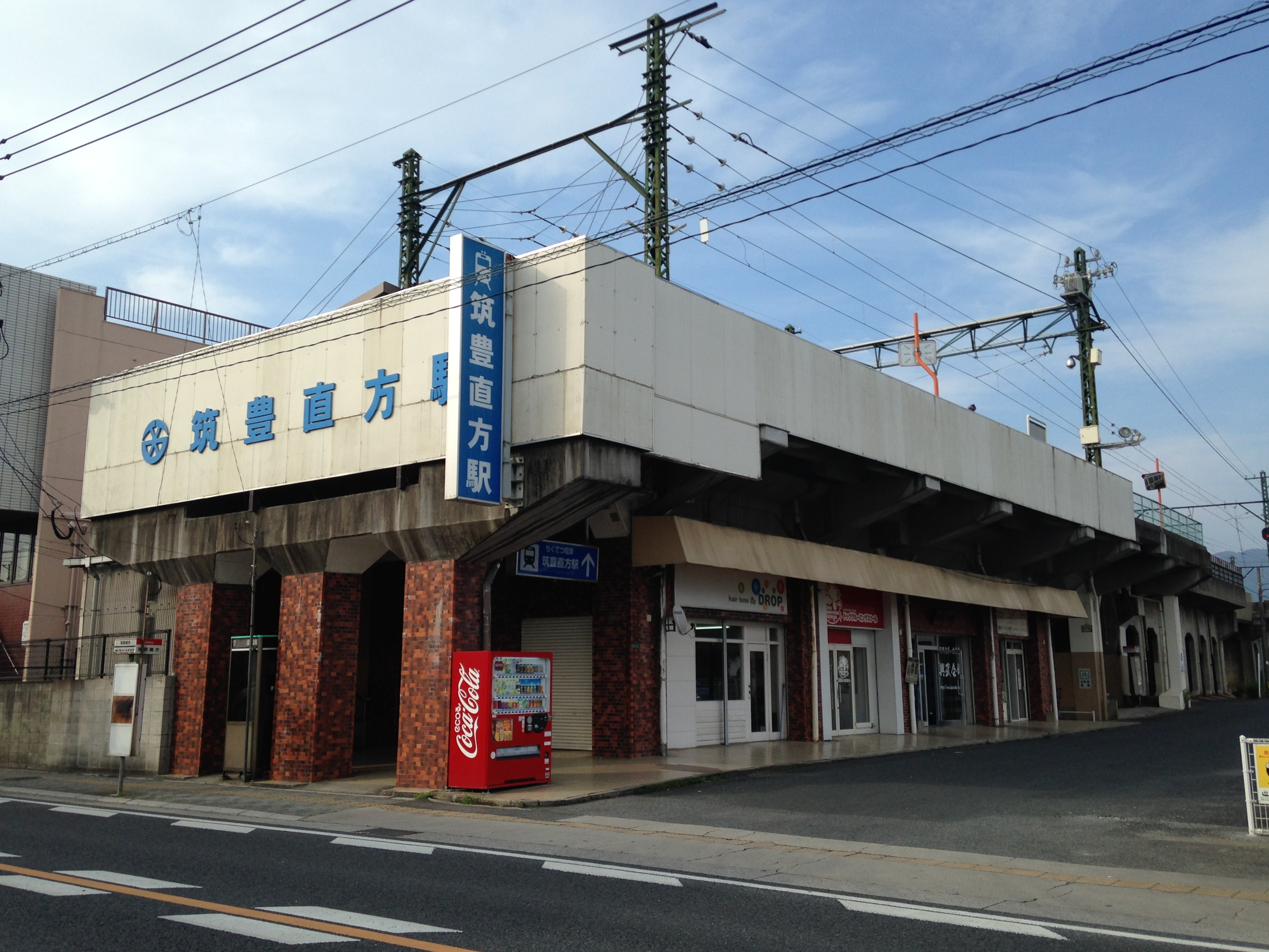
- Chikuhō-Nōgata Station building

General information
- Location: 1-chome Chiko, Nōgata-shi, Fukuoka-ken 822-0022; Japan
- Coordinates: 33°45′12.52″N 130°43′33.62″E
- Operator: Chikuhō Electric Railroad
- Line: ■ Chikuhō Electric Railroad Line
- Platforms: 2 bay platforms

Construction
- Structure type: elevated

Other information
- Station code: CK 21
- Website: Official website

History
- Opened: 18 September 1959

Passengers
- FY2022: 848
Location
- Location within Fukuoka Prefecture Location within Japan

Chikuhō-Nōgata Station (筑豊直方駅, Chikuhō-nōgata-eki) is a passenger railway station located in the city of Nōgata, Fukuoka. It is operated by the private transportation company Chikuhō Electric Railroad (Chikutetsu), and has station number CK21.

== Lines ==
The station is the terminus of the Chikuhō Electric Railroad Line and is 16.0 kilometers from the opposite terminus of the line at Kurosaki Station.

== Station layout ==
The station is elevated station with two bay platforms and two tracks. Most trains use Platform 2 because it is directly connected to the stairs at the station entrance and exit, and there is a shed. Platform 1 is rarely used, except during rush hours and special train operations. The station is unattended.

== Platforms ==
1	■ Chikuhō Electric Railroad Line	for Kusubashi, Einomaru, Kurosaki

== Adjacent stations ==
←	Service	→
Chikuhō Electric Railroad Line
Ganda	Local	Terminus

== History ==
The station opened on 18 September 1959.

== Passenger statistics ==
In fiscal 2022, the station was used by 848 passengers daily.

== Surrounding area ==
- Nōgata Station
- Fukuoka Prefectural Route 27
- Nōgata City Hall
- Nōgata Police Station
- Nōgata Tax Office
- Nōgata Pension Service
- Nōgatakita Elementary School
- Nōgata City Library
- Yamato Seiran High School

== See also ==
- List of railway stations in Japan
