= Chikushikoku =

Chikushikoku (竹斯国) is the name of a country or land that appears in the Book of Sui Dynasty and History of the Northern Dynasties in the history of China as being in the Japan region. or land name that appears in Northern History. It is compared to Tsukushi Province.

== Outline ==
The country of Chikushikoku appears in "Book of Sui" volume 81, biography 46 "Eastern Barbarians, the country of Buyeo" and "Northern History" volume 94, biography 82. It is mentioned immediately after the passage "The Emperor of the Land where the Sun Rises" in the letter sent by the Buyeo (Wa) envoy, Tarishihiko, to Emperor Yang of Sui.

== Descriptions in the Sui Dynasty and the Northern History ==
『Book of Sui』In the next year, the king sent Pei Qing, a scholar, to the country of the night, and he went to the country of the south, to the country of Danla, through the country of Dusma, which was in the middle of the sea, and to the country of the east, and to the country of the east, and to the country of the king of the Qin, whose people were the same as those of China. They passed through more than ten countries and reached the coast. From Takeshi to the east, they are all subordinate to the Japanese.

『History of the Northern Dynasties』In the next year, the emperor sent Pei Shiqing to the Japanese state, and he sent him to the island of Takeshima, looking south at the country of Tama, through the country of Dusma, which was in the middle of the sea, and east to a country, and then to the country of Takeshima, and east to the country of Qinwang, where the people were the same as the Chinese, and they thought they were the barbarians, but they could not be understood. They passed through more than ten countries and reached the coast. From Takeshi to the east, they are all subordinate to the Japanese.

It describes the route taken by the envoys from the Sui Dynasty. The envoys went from Baekje to Takeshima (not an island that has been disputed by Japan and Korea since the late 20th century), Tsushima to Iki, and then arrived at "Takeshikoku. The area east of there is said to be the territory of Japan. The reason why "Sui Dynasty" refers to "Hye-qing" and "Northern History" refers to "Hye-se-qing" is that "Sui Dynasty" was Naming taboo.

=== Different theories ===
The common theory is that the "其人・・・・・・不能明也" part of the above Chinese historical document is an explanation of the Shin'okoku, but the following theory exists.

- According to Yozaburo Ishihara, it is thought that people from Takeshikoku (Tsukushi Province) were considered to be from the same birthplace as Huaxia.

== Bibliography ==
- 石原道博 編訳, ed. (1985-05-16). 魏志倭人伝・後漢書倭伝・ 宋書倭国伝・隋書倭国伝――中国正史日本伝1. 岩波文庫 青401-1 (新訂 ed.). 岩波書店. ISBN 4-00-334011-6. - 和田 石原 1951 の新訂- 注記：石原は、北史は隋書・梁書によっているとのことで、魏志・隋書の脚注において、北史との相違部分を説明している。
- 邪馬台国 石原洋三郎 令和元年十月 第一印刷

== See also ==
- Tsukushi (disambiguation)
- Tsukushi Province
- Shin'okoku
