= Tsukushi =

Tsukushi may refer to:

== Places ==
- Tsukushi Province, old Japanese province, subsequently divided into
  - Chikuzen Province, old Japanese province, part of Fukuoka Prefecture without south and east Fukuoka
  - Chikugo Province, old Japanese province, the southern part of Fukuoka Prefecture, on Kyūshū
- Kyushu, island of Japan, archaically called "Tsukushi-no-shima"

== People ==
- Tsukushi Hirokado (1548–1615), second son of Tsukushi Korekado and warlord/kokujin of Chikuzen
- Tsukushi (wrestler) (born 1997), Japanese professional wrestler
- Akihito Tsukushi, author of the manga Made in Abyss
- Tsukushi Futaba (二葉つくし), a fictional character in the musical anime and media franchise BanG Dream!

== Other uses ==
- Tsukushi (protein), an extracellular proteoglycan
- Japanese name for the edible shoots of field horsetail
- Japanese cruiser Tsukushi, an 1880 early unprotected cruiser
