= Kurate, Fukuoka =

Kurate 鞍手町
- Town
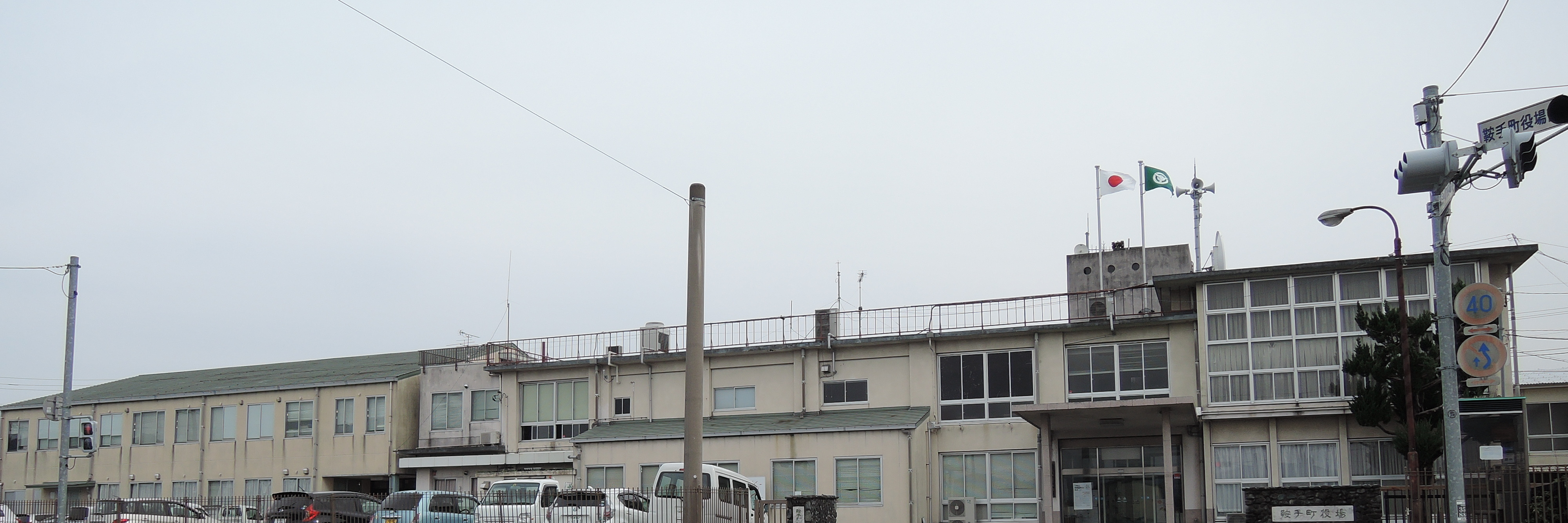
- Kurate town hall

- Flag Chapter
- Interactive map of Kurate
- Location in Japan
- Coordinates: 33°47′31.5″N 130°40′26.6″E
- Country: Japan
- Region: Kyushu
- Prefecture: Fukuoka
- District: Kurate

Area
  - Total: 35.60 km^{2} (13.75 sq mi)

Population (January 31, 2024)
  - Total: 14,988
  - Density: 421.0/km^{2} (1,090/sq mi)
- Time zone: UTC+09:00 (JST)
- City hall address: 3705 Nakayama, Kurate-cho, Kurate-gun, Fukuoka-ken 807-1392
- Website: Official website
- Symbols
- Flower: Aster, Lily, Chrysanthemum, Narcissus
- Tree: Cinnamomum camphora, Osmanthus fragrans

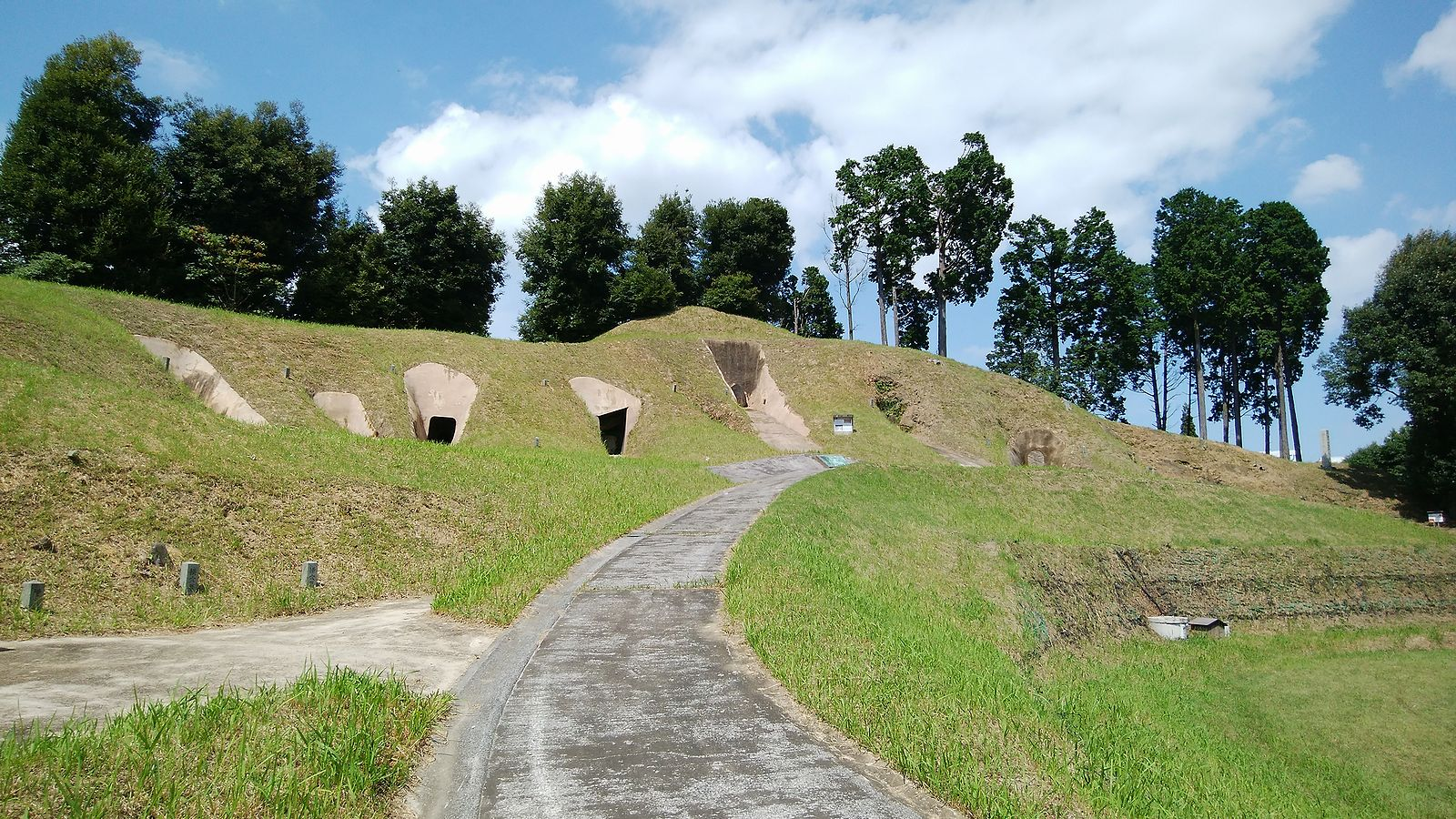
Furutsuki Yokoana

Kurate (鞍手町, Kurate-machi) is a town located in Kurate District, Fukuoka Prefecture, Japan. As of 31 January 2024, the town had an estimated population of 14,988 in 7,442 households, and a population density of 420 persons per km². The total area of the town is 35.60 km^{2} (13.75 sq mi).

== Geography ==
Kurate is located is located in the Munakata region in the northwest of Fukuoka Prefecture, approximately 20 kilometers southwest of Kitakyushu (central Kokura) and 60 kilometers northeast of Fukuoka City, at the northern tip of the Chikuho region. The Onga River flows through the eastern end of the town. The area from the center to the northern and eastern parts of the town is relatively flat, but the area from the northwest to the western and southern parts is mountainous.

=== Neighboring municipalities ===
Fukuoka Prefecture

- Kitakyushu
- Miyawaka
- Munakata
- Nakama
- Nōgata
- Onga

=== Climate ===
Kurate has a humid subtropical climate (Köppen Cfa) characterized by warm summers and cool winters with light to no snowfall. The average annual temperature in Kurate is 15.6 °C. The average annual rainfall is 1,560 mm, with September the wettest month. The temperatures are highest on average in August, at around 26.8 °C, and lowest in January, at around 5.0 °C.

=== Demographics ===
Per Japanese census data, the population of Kurate has been on decline, as shown below

Historical population
Year	Pop.	±%
1940	30,159	—
1950	29,448	−2.4%
1960	28,714	−2.5%
1970	18,266	−36.4%
1980	19,079	+4.5%
1990	20,332	+6.6%
2000	19,266	−5.2%
2010	17,095	−11.3%
2020	15,080	−11.8%

== History ==
The area of Kurate was part of ancient Chikuzen Province. Jomon period shell middens have been found within the town borders. During the Kofun period the area was the seat of the kuni no miyatsuko of Tsukushi, and the name "Kurate" is said to derive from a title given to the local prince by Emperor Kimmei for his exploits in a war to assist the Kingdom of Baekje. The Furutsuki Cave Tombs were built between the end of the 6th and early 7th century, and are now a National Historic Site. During the Edo Period, the area was under the control of Fukuoka Domain. After the Meiji restoration, the villages of Tsurugi, Nishikawa, and Kozuki was established with the creation of the modern municipalities system on April 1, 1889. Tsurugi was raised to town status on August 1, 1952. On January 1, 1955 Tsurugi merged with, Nishikawa and Kozuki villages to form the town of Kurate.

== Government ==
Kurate has a mayor-council form of government with a directly elected mayor and a unicameral town council of 13 members. Kurate, collectively with the city of Miyawaka and town of Kotake, contributes one member to the Fukuoka Prefectural Assembly. In terms of national politics, the town is part of the Fukuoka 8th district of the lower house of the Diet of Japan.

== Economy ==
During the Meiji period, Kurate, along with the municipalities of the Chikuho area, developed with the Kitakyushu industrial zone through coal mining, and is still considered part of to the Greater Kitakyushu Metropolitan Area. However, as the demand for coal decreased due to the energy revolution, the coal mines that had sponsored prosperity have closed, leading to depopulation. The last mine closed in 1971. An industrial park has been constructed to replace the former coal industry in an effort to attract manufacturing industries.The attraction has had a positive effects, with the percentage of residents engaged in secondary industries far exceeding the average for Fukuoka Prefecture as a whole, and the number of residents commuting to work within the town exceeding 40%.

== Education ==
Kurate has six public elementary schools and one public junior high school by the town government, and one public high school operated by the Fukuoka Board of Education..

== Transportation ==
=== Railways ===
JR Kyushu - Chikuhō Main Line

JC Kurate

=== Highways ===
- Kyushu Expressway
