= Honjō Station =

Honjō Station is the name of three train stations in Japan:

- Honjō Station (Fukuoka) (本城駅)
- Honjō Station (Saitama) (本庄駅)
- Honjō Station (Fukui) (本荘駅)

== See also ==
- Kinshichō Station - formerly (between 1894 and 1915) called Honjo Station (本所駅)
