= Honjo Athletic Stadium =

Stadium in Fukuoka prefecture, Japan

Coordinates: 33°53′25″N 130°43′54″E

Honjo Stadium
- 北九州市立本城陸上競技場
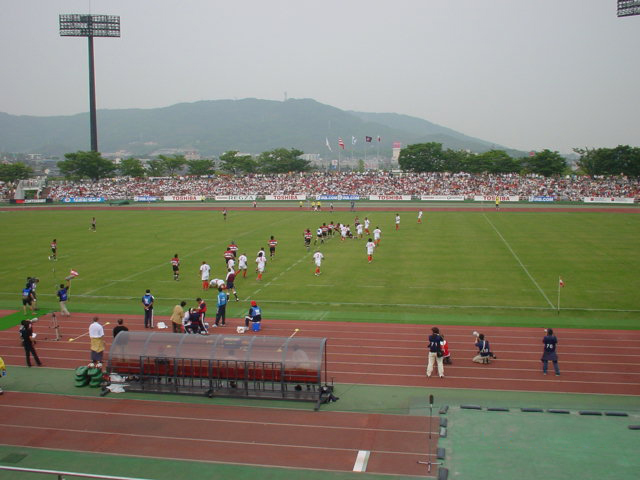
- Interactive map of Honjo Stadium
- Full name: Kitakyushu City Honjo Athletics Stadium
- Location: Kitakyushu, Fukuoka, Japan
- Capacity: 10,000

Construction
- Opened: 1989

Website
- Official site

Kitakyushu City Honjo Athletics Stadium (北九州市立本城陸上競技場, Kitakyūshūshiritsu Honjō Rikujōkyōgijō) is a small athletic and multi-purpose stadium (capacity 10,202), opened in 1990 at Honjō Park in Ohiraki, Yahata Nishi-ku, Kitakyushu, Fukuoka prefecture, Japan.

== Association football ==
It was the designated home stadium for Giravanz Kitakyushu (formerly known as New Wave Kitakyushu until 2009 season), an association football club promoted to J. League from 2010 season to 2016 season. It underwent a major renovation which lasted until 2010 to install benches on the grass-covered spectator area to meet the minimum requirements of 10,000-seatings which J. League organization requires all J2 clubs to have their own stadia. Now its capacity is 10,202.

== Rugby ==
Coca-Cola West Red Sparks v Ricoh Black Rams (Top League at kick off, December 5, 2009)

It was the venue for Japan versus Tonga in the inaugural IRB Pacific 5 Nations rugby union tournament on June 4, 2006. The game celebrated the recent opening on March 16, 2006, of the New Kitakyushu Airport and was the first test match to be played in Kyūshū in 22 years. Some 8,100 spectators saw the game in a nearly full stadium.

Together with Sayagatani stadium in Tobata ward, Honjo stadium hosted the All Japan rugby clubs championship on January 13 and 14, 2008.

On December 5, 2009, the first Top League game ever held in Kitakyushu was played here. Coca-Cola West Red Sparks beat Ricoh Black Rams 29-22.

== Access ==
The nearest railway station is Honjō Station and Futajima Station on the Chikuhō Main Line, 15 minutes walk away. The Kitakyushu City Buses line No. 30 from Orio Station takes about ten minutes to the stadium and costs 230 yen. Kitakyushu City Buses runs shuttle buses between the stadium and Orio Station when Giravanz plays home games.

== See also ==
- Chichibunomiya Rugby Stadium
- Global Arena
- Kintetsu Hanazono Rugby Stadium
- Olympic Stadium (Tokyo)
- Level-5 stadium
- Mikuni World Stadium Kitakyushu
