= Nakama, Fukuoka =

Nakama 中間市
- City
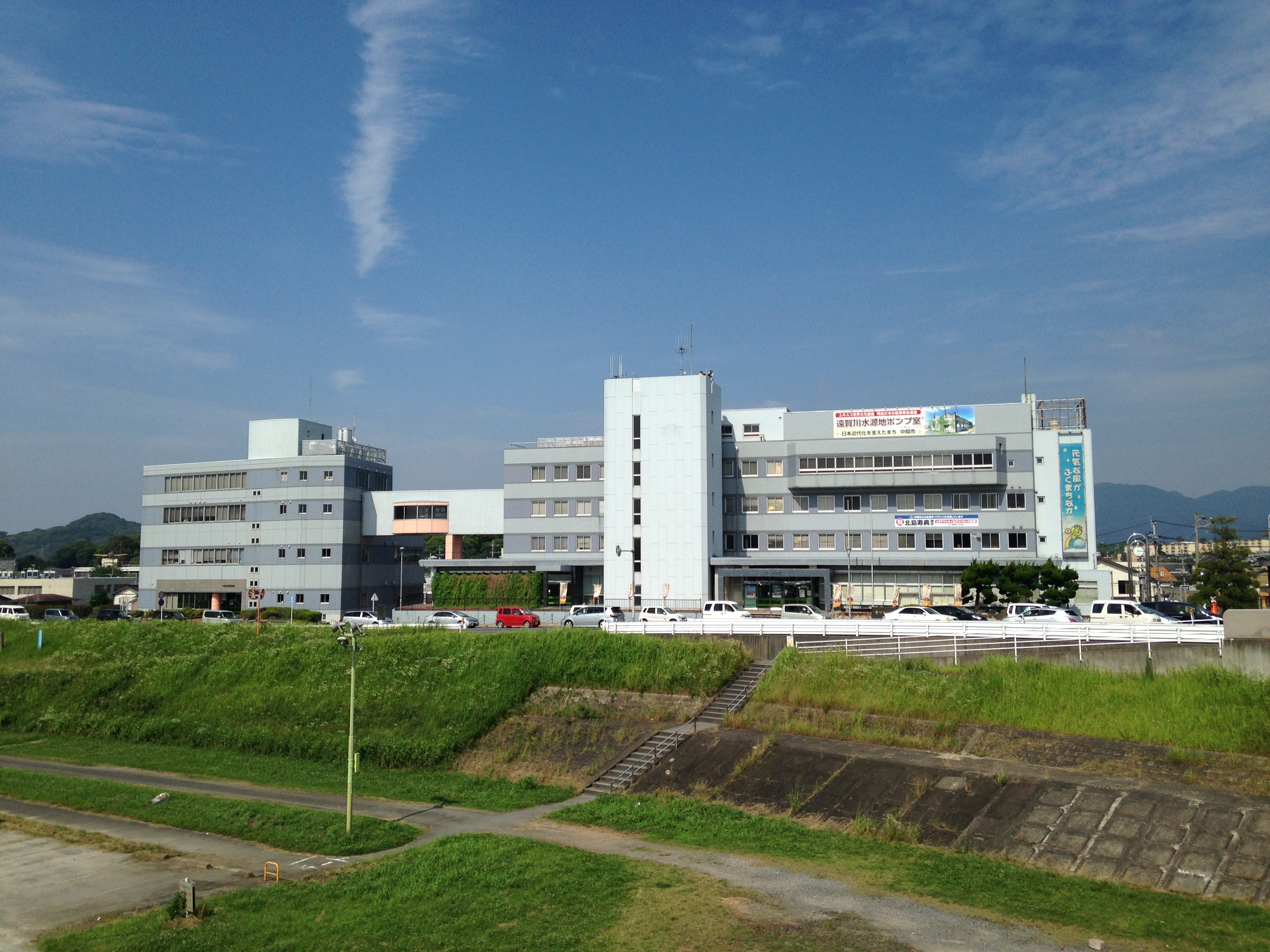

- Flag Seal
- Location of Nakama in Fukuoka Prefecture

- Location in Japan
- Coordinates: 33°49′00″N 130°42′33″E
- Country: Japan
- Region: Kyushu
- Prefecture: Fukuoka

Government
  - Mayor: Fukuda Kenji

Area
  - Total: 15.96 km^{2} (6.16 sq mi)

Population (February 29, 2024)
  - Total: 39,366
  - Density: 2,467/km^{2} (6,388/sq mi)
- Time zone: UTC+09:00 (JST)
- City hall address: 1-1-1 Nakama, Nakama-shi, Fukuoka-ken 809-8501
- Website: Official website
- Symbols
- Flower: Pansy, Cosmos
- Tree: Camphora officinarum, Ilex rotunda

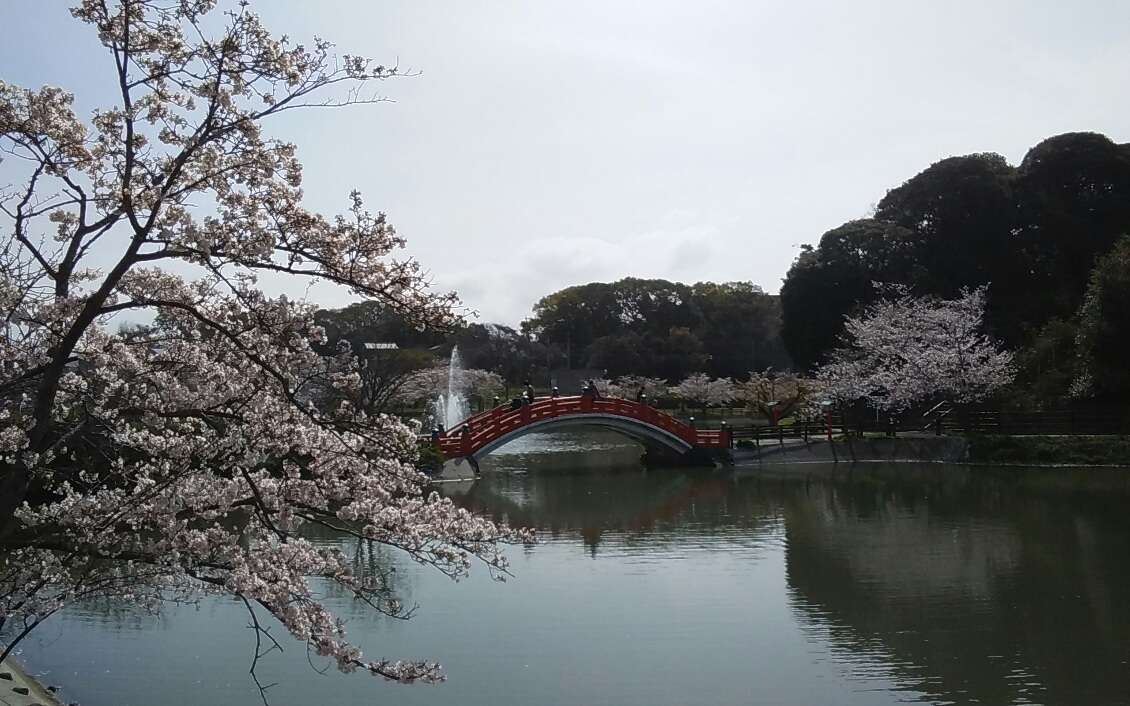
Cherry Blossoms in Habu Park

Nakama (中間市, Nakama-shi) is a city located in Fukuoka Prefecture, Japan. As of 1 January 2024, the city had an estimated population of 39,366 in 20466 households, and a population density of 2500 persons per km^{2}. The total area of the city is 15.96 km^{2} (6.16 sq mi).. It is perhaps best known as the birthplace of actor Ken Takakura.

== Location ==
Nakama is located along the Onga River, bordering Kitakyushu City's Yahatanishi Ward to the east and south. The city is divided into two districts, Kawanishi and Kawahigashi, by the Onga River which flows north-south through the center of the city. Residential areas and commercial facilities are spread out in the eastern region, and approximately 90% of the total population is concentrated in this area. On the other hand, the western region is home to agricultural land, parks, and other green areas, and some industrial parks are also located there.

=== Neighboring municipalities ===
Fukuoka Prefecture

- Kitakyushu
- Kurate
- Mizumaki
- Nōgata

=== Climate ===
Nakama has a humid subtropical climate (Köppen Cfa) characterized by warm summers and cool winters with light to no snowfall. The average annual temperature in Nakama is 15.6 °C. The average annual rainfall is 1560 mm with September as the wettest month. The temperatures are highest on average in August, at around 26.8 °C, and lowest in January, at around 5.0 °C.

=== Demographics ===
Per Japanese census data, the population of Nakama is as shown below

Historical population
Year	Pop.	±%
1940	31,578	—
1950	36,350	+15.1%
1960	42,418	+16.7%
1970	33,734	−20.5%
1980	48,647	+44.2%
1990	49,216	+1.2%
2000	48,032	−2.4%
2010	44,214	−7.9%
2010	40,362	−8.7%

== History ==
The area of Nakama was part of ancient Chikuzen Province. It has been a thriving area for rice cultivation since ancient times, and many artifacts from the Yayoi period have been discovered. From the Kamakura period to the Muromachi period, the area of Nakama became the domain of the Aso clan. During the Edo Period the area was under the control of Fukuoka Domain. After the Meiji restoration, the village of Nagatsu (長津村) was established on May 1, 1889 with the creation of the modern municipalities system. It was raised to town status on November 1, 1922, and changed its name to Nakama (中間町) on September 1, 1924. Nakama was raised to city status on November 1, 1958.

There were plans for amalgamation, with the city becoming a ward of Kitakyushu, which would have become Nakama-ku, Kitakyushu. A poll (December 2004) stated that 70% of the citizens of Nakama were in favor of the city being absorbed into Kitakyushu. However, on Christmas Eve 2004 Nakama city councilors rejected the merger plan, despite it having initially been proposed by Nakama. The councilors claim that they are rejecting the merger for the good of the city. The suspected main reason was that only 3 of the 21 councilors would be retained afterwards.

== Government ==
Nakama has a mayor-council form of government with a directly elected mayor and a unicameral city council of 16 members. Nakama contributes one member to the Fukuoka Prefectural Assembly. In terms of national politics, the city is part of the Fukuoka 8th district of the lower house of the Diet of Japan.

== Economy ==
During the Meiji period, Nakama, along with the municipalities of the Chikuho area, developed with the Kitakyushu industrial zone through coal mining, and is still considered part of to the Greater Kitakyushu Metropolitan Area. However, as the demand for coal decreased due to the energy revolution, the coal mines that had sponsored prosperity have closed, leading to depopulation. The sites of the former coal mines has been developed into an industrial park.

== Education ==
Nakama has six public elementary schools and four public junior high schools operated by the city government and one public high school operated by the Fukuoka Prefectural Board of Education. There is also one private high school, and the prefecture operates one special education school for the handicapped.

== Transportation ==
=== Railways ===
JR Kyushu - Chikuhō Main Line

JC Chikuzen-Habu - Nakama

Chikuhō Electric Railroad Line

■ Higashi-Nakama - Chikuhō-Nakama - Kibōgaoka-Kōkōmae

=== Highways ===
Nakama is not served by any National Expressway or National Highway.

== Local attractions ==
Habu Park is the largest park in Nakama, with many cherry blossom trees. The Roofless Museum (Yane No Nai Hakubutsukan), near the JR Nakama Station, is a small green park area with sculptures by artists from around the world. The city is known locally for its AEON (formerly Daiei) "Shoppers Mall" - a mall with shops, restaurants, a movie theatre (formerly United Cinemas International), a bowling alley, and game centres.

=== Festivals ===
Chikuzen Nakama Cherry Blossom Festival (end of March - beginning of April) at Habu Park. Kisshoji Temple Wisteria Festival (located in Yahatanishi, near Nakama High School, and held April 27–29. Chikuzen Nakamagawa Festival - held in the Obon season every year on August 15. Includes a fireworks festival and food/game stalls as well. Chikuzen Nakama Yatchare Festival, previously held near Onga River, but now at Harmony Hall, Nakama's biggest festival of the year on the third weekend of October.

== Gallery ==
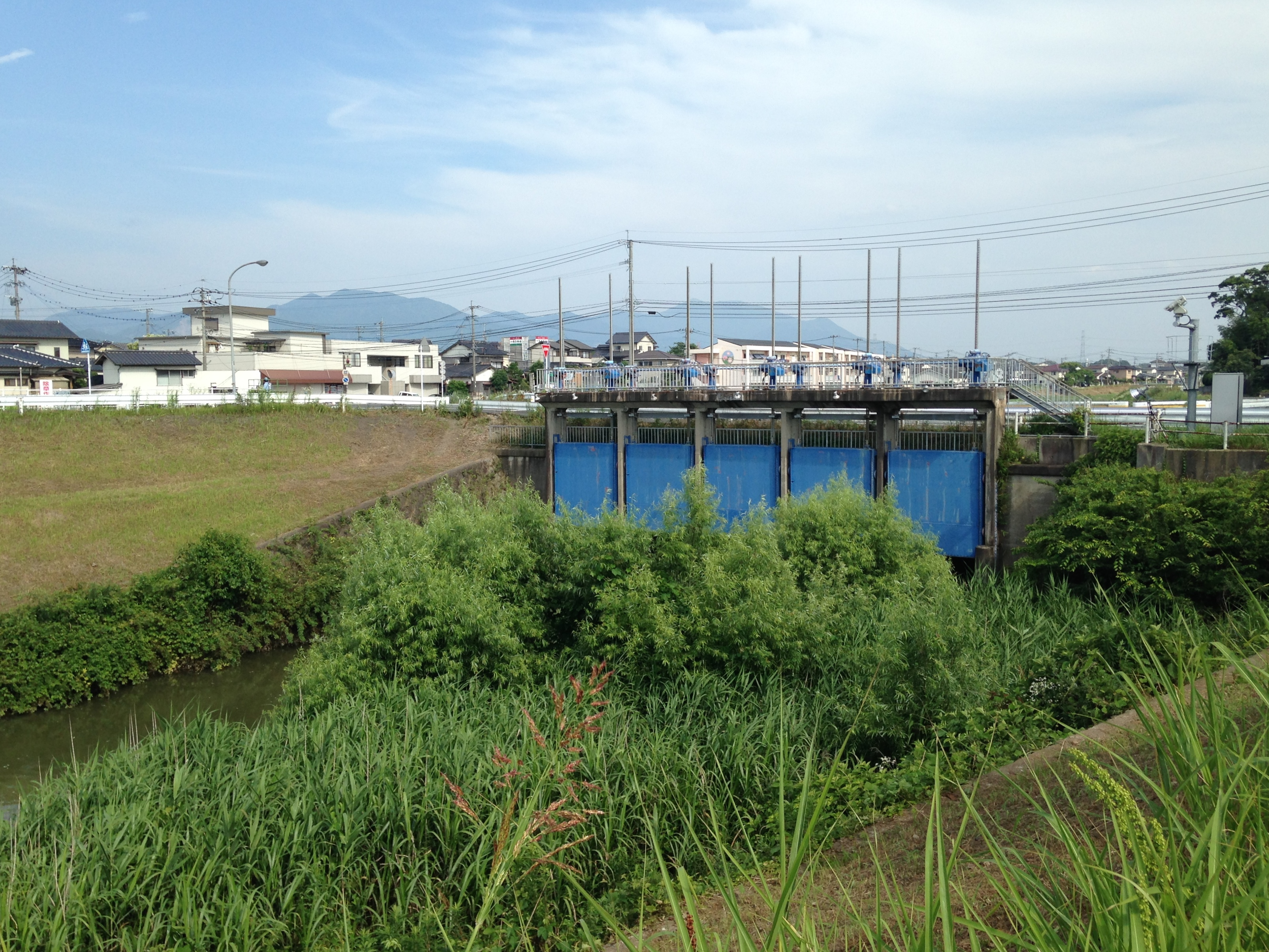
Dotenouchi Lock on Sasaogawa River

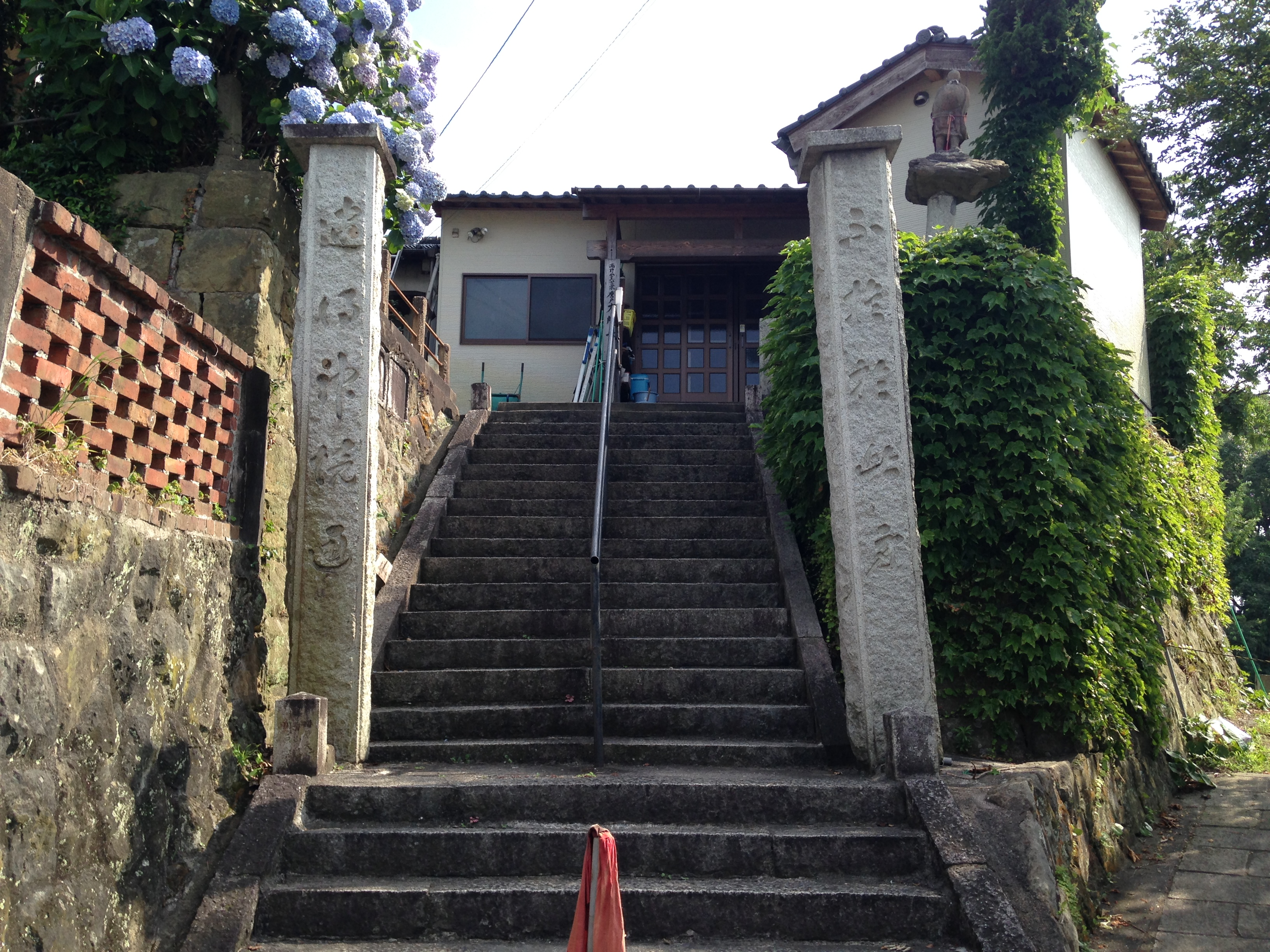
Daishiji Temple

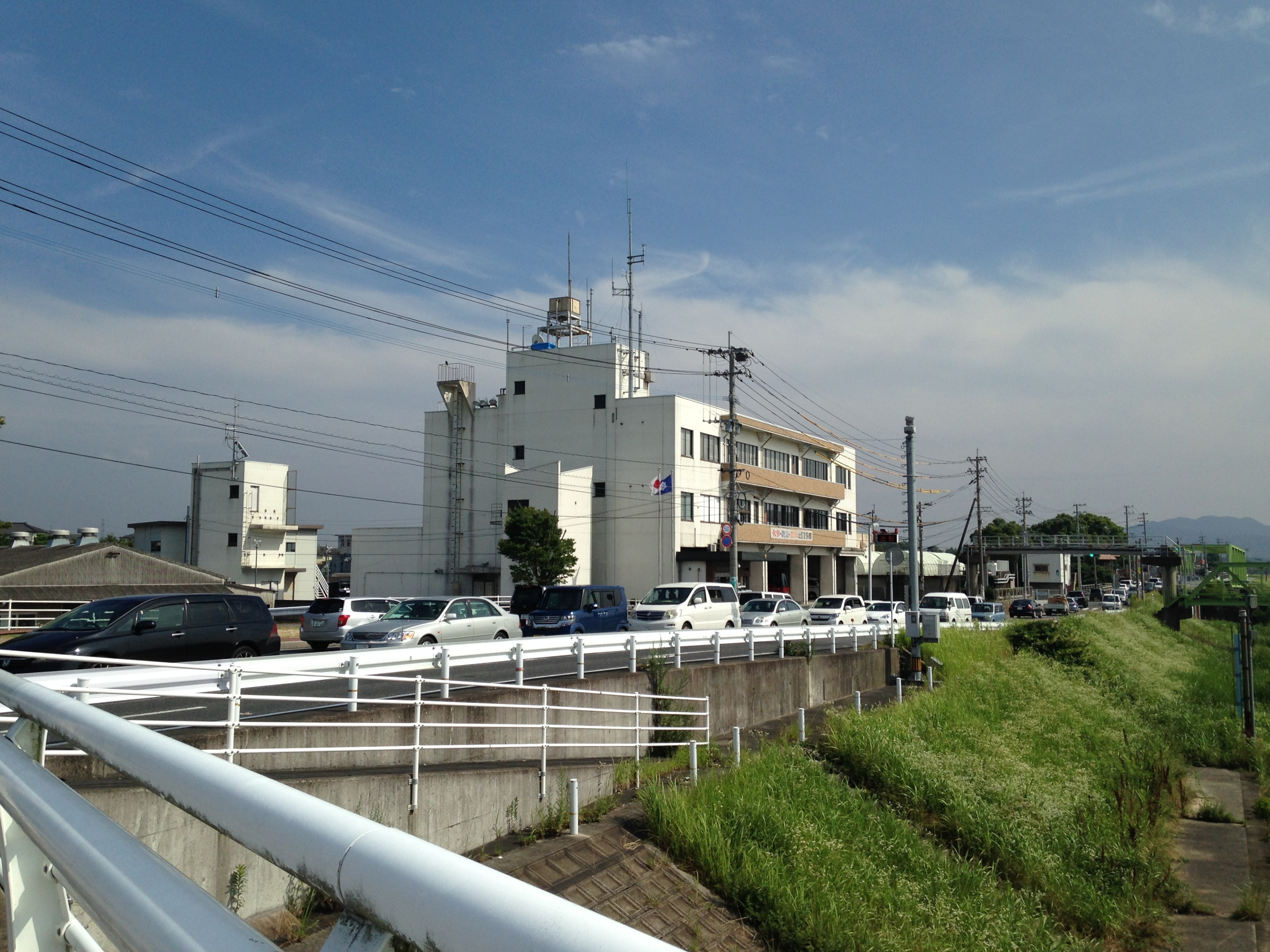
Fire Station

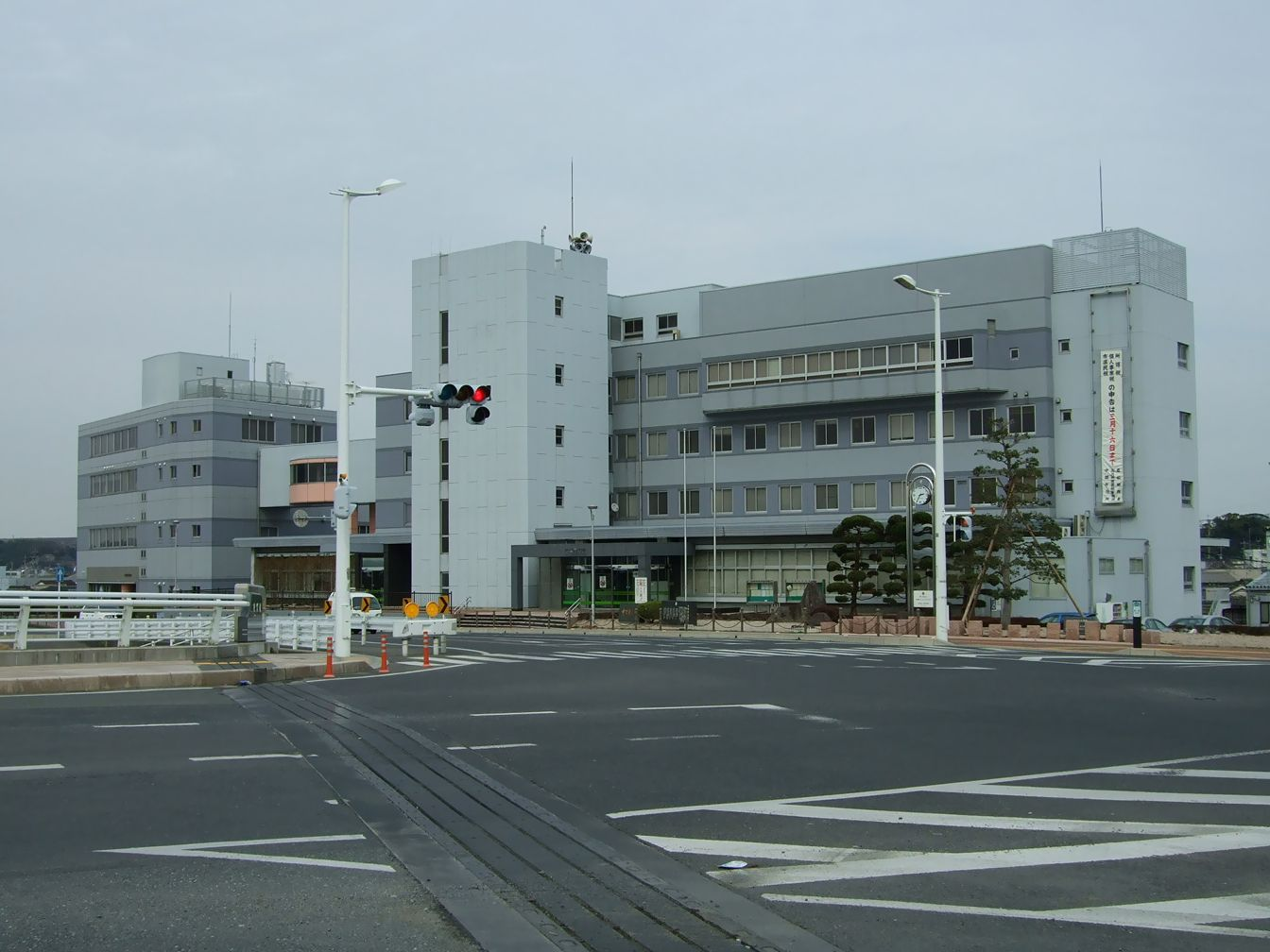
Nakama City Hall

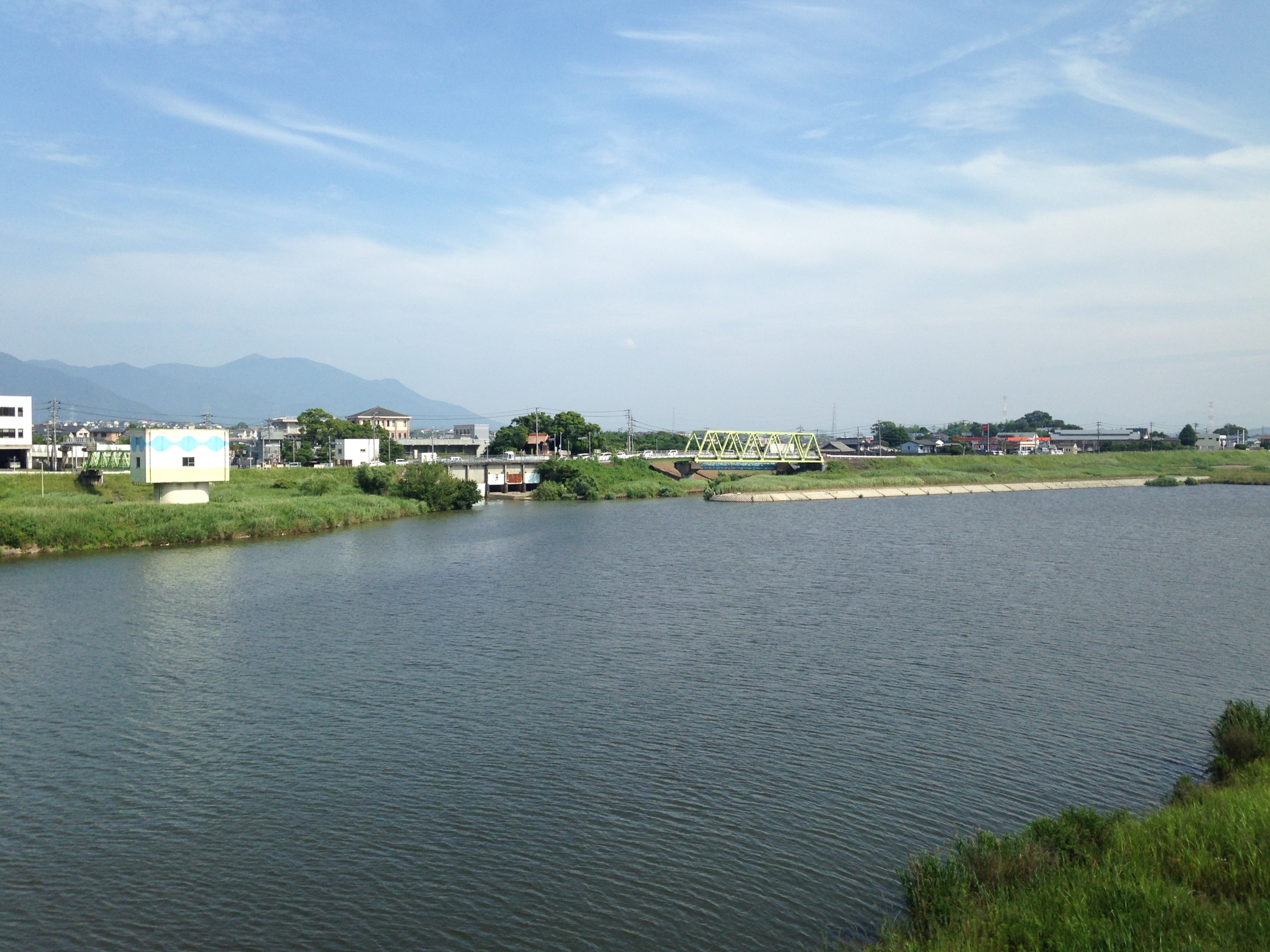
Onga River and Sasaogawabashi Bridge

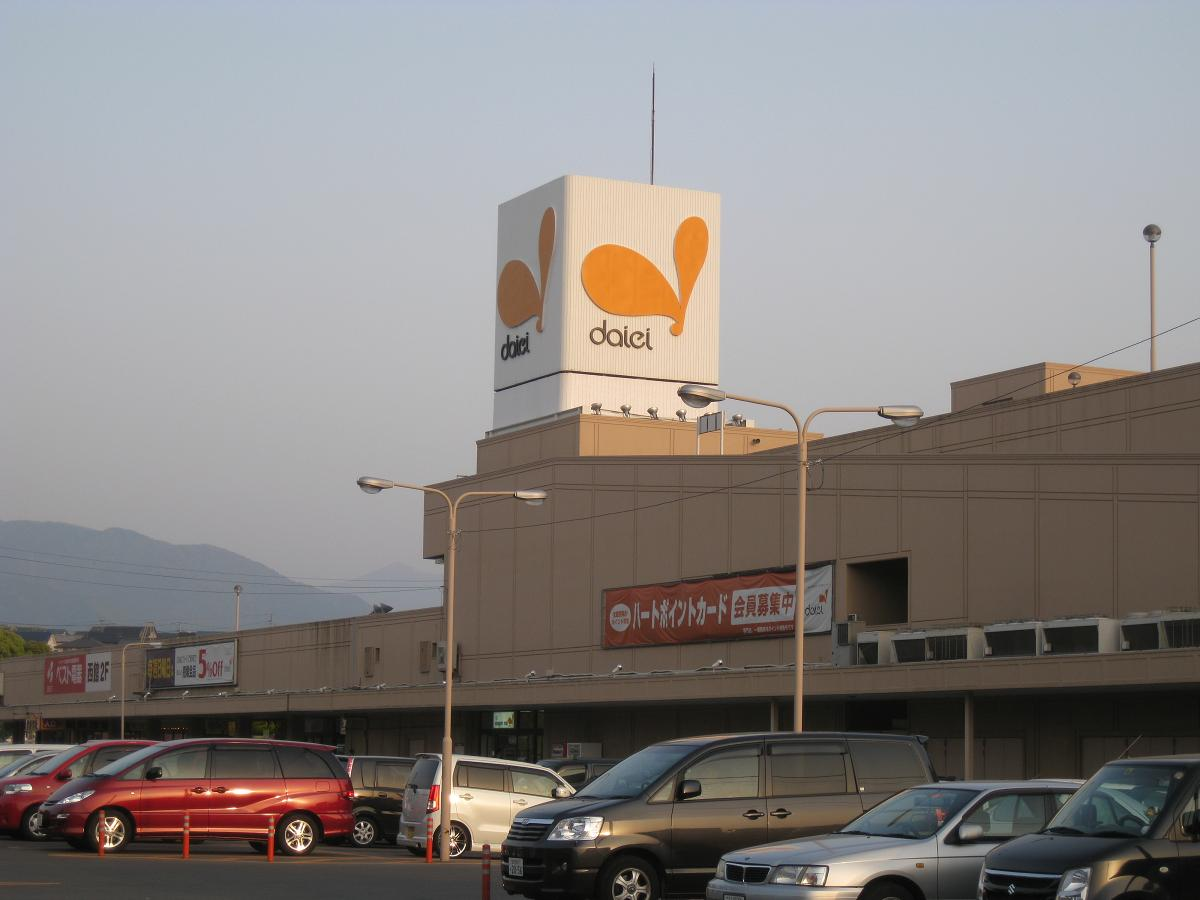
Former Daiei Mall (now AEON)

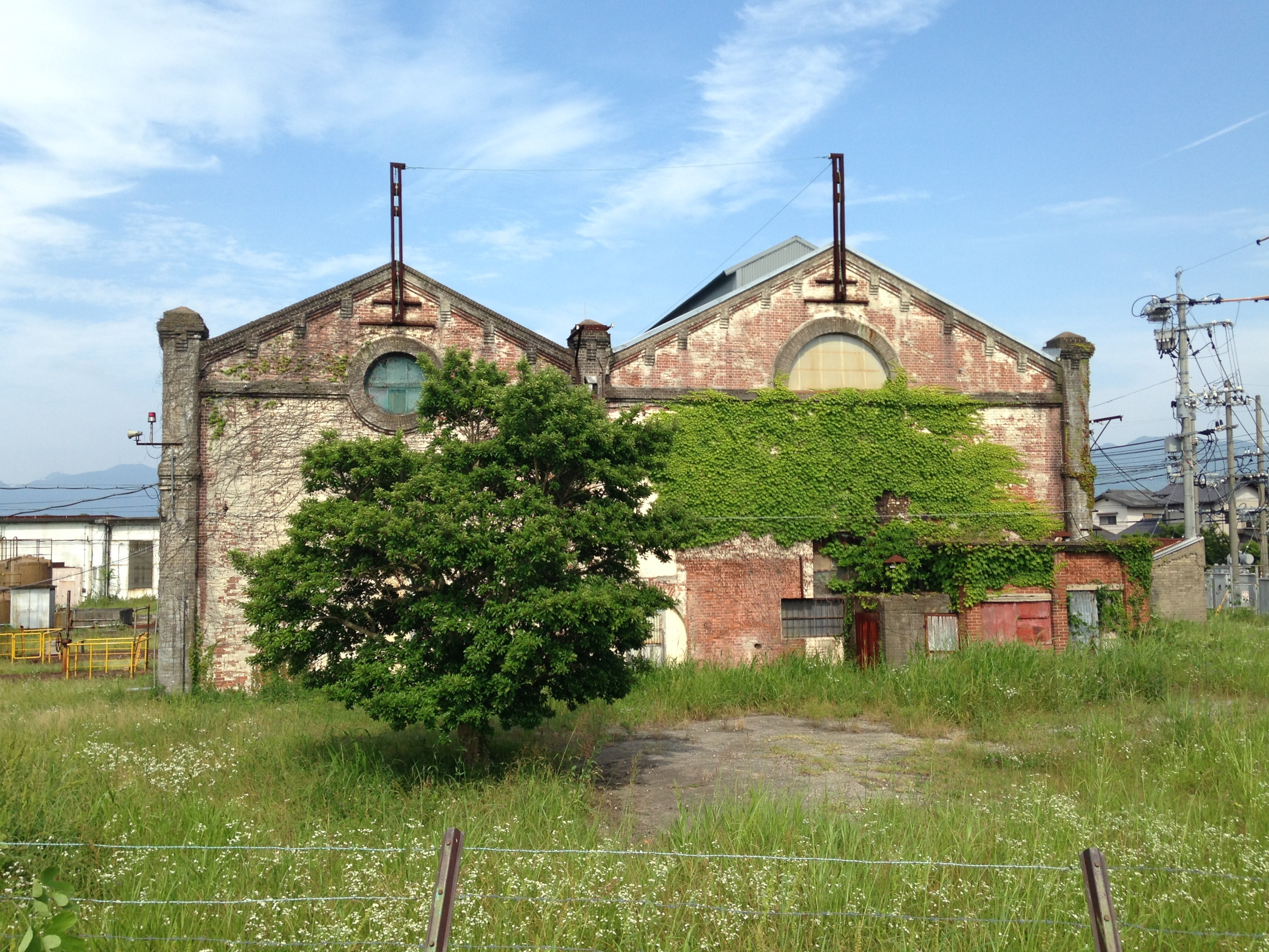
Onga River Pumping Station
