= Furutsuki Cave Tombs =

Archaeological site in Fukuoka, Japan

Furutsuki Cave Tomb Cluster
- 古月横穴 (Japanese)
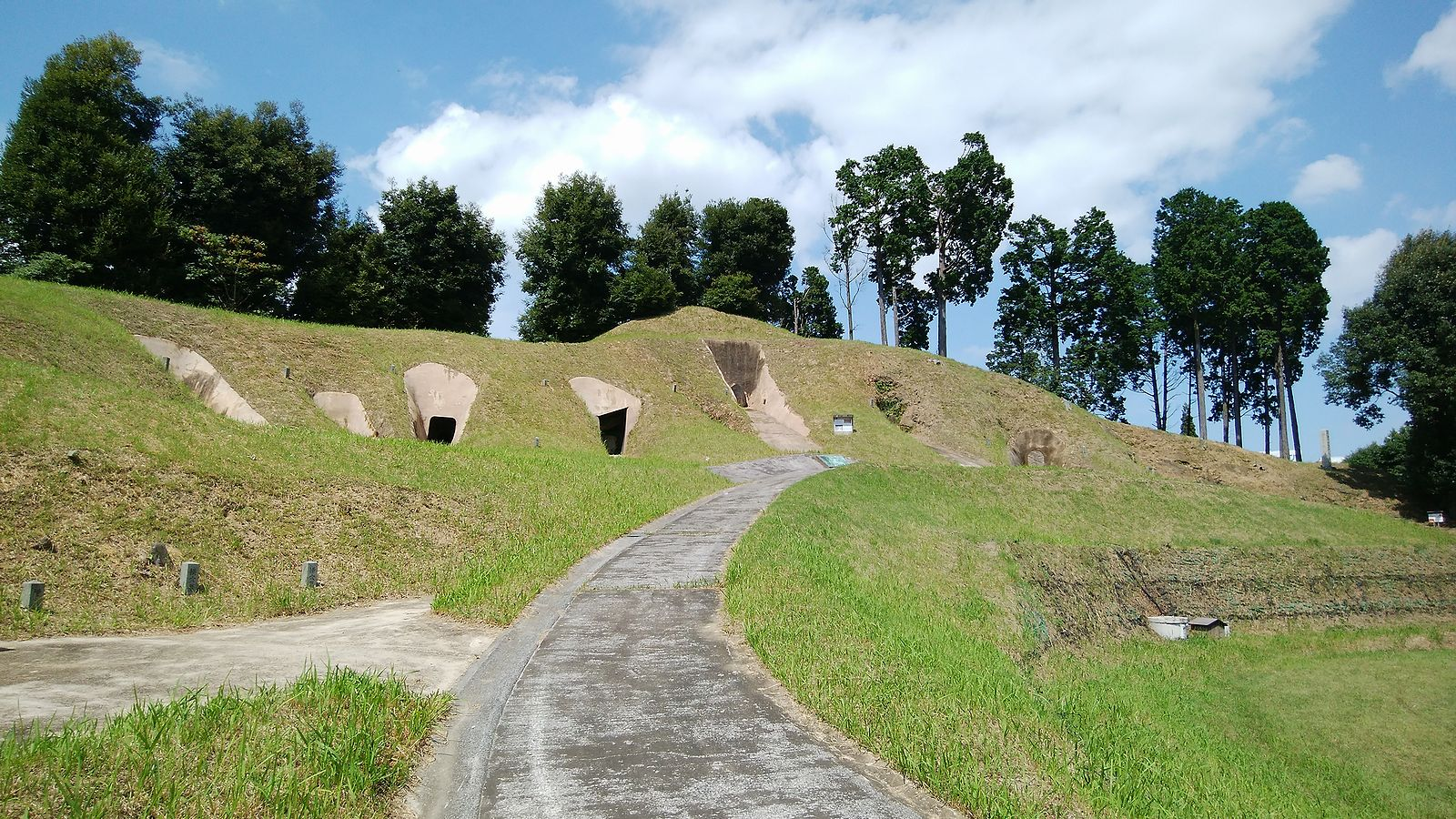
- Furutsuki Cave Tomb Cluster

- Furutsuki Cave Tomb Cluster Furutsuki Cave Tombs (Japan)
- 33°48′14″N 130°40′09″E
- Type: corridor-type kofun (横穴式石室, yokoana-shiki sekishitsu)
- Periods: Kofun period
- Location: Kurate, Fukuoka, Japan
- Region: Kyushu

History
- Built: 6th to 7th century AD

Site notes
- Public access: Yes
- National Historic Site of Japan

The Furutsuki Cave Tomb Cluster (古月横穴, Furutsuki yokoana) is an archaeological site containing Kofun period yokoanabo (横穴墓), tunnel tombs in artificial caves located in the town of Kurate, Fukuoka, Kurate District, Fukuoka Prefecture, Japan. It was granted protection as a National Historic Site in 1932, with the area under protection expanded in 1986.

== Overview ==
The Furutsuki Cave Tomb Cluster is a group of horizontal cave tombs located on the slope of a hill on the west bank of the Nishi River, which flows into the Onga River. Discovered in 1926, tombs were designated as a National Historic Site in 1932, and subsequent archaeological excavations confirmed a total 41 tombs on three slopes, east, west, and south slopes of the hill, including the original 13. The cave-shaped tombs are carved into the hard rock of a hill, and are thought to have been built over a period of about 100 years from the late 6th century to the late 7th century as the tombs for an important local clan. The Furutsuki site is unusual among horizontal tombs, in that it has decorative patterns on the walls inside the tombs; Tomb No. 9 has a pattern of diagonal and horizontal lines is drawn in red, and No. 9 has a diagonal lattice pattern painted in vermilion. It can be assumed that there were trends in construction methods depending on the era, such as the entrance to the side cave having an eave stone, and the size of the tomb chambers varying in size. Grave goods such as Haji ware, Sue ware, iron swords, horse harnesses, and earrings were unearthed from almost all of the graves. The site has now been maintained as a public park, and relics are displayed and preserved at the Kurate Town History and Folklore Museum.

The site is approximately 4.3 kilometers west of Kurate Station on the JR Kyushu Chikuhō Main Line.

== See also ==
- List of Historic Sites of Japan (Fukuoka)
- Decorated kofun
