= Chikuzen-Ueki Station =

Railway station in Nōgata, Fukuoka Prefecture, Japan

JC 21 Chikuzen-Ueki Station 筑前植木駅
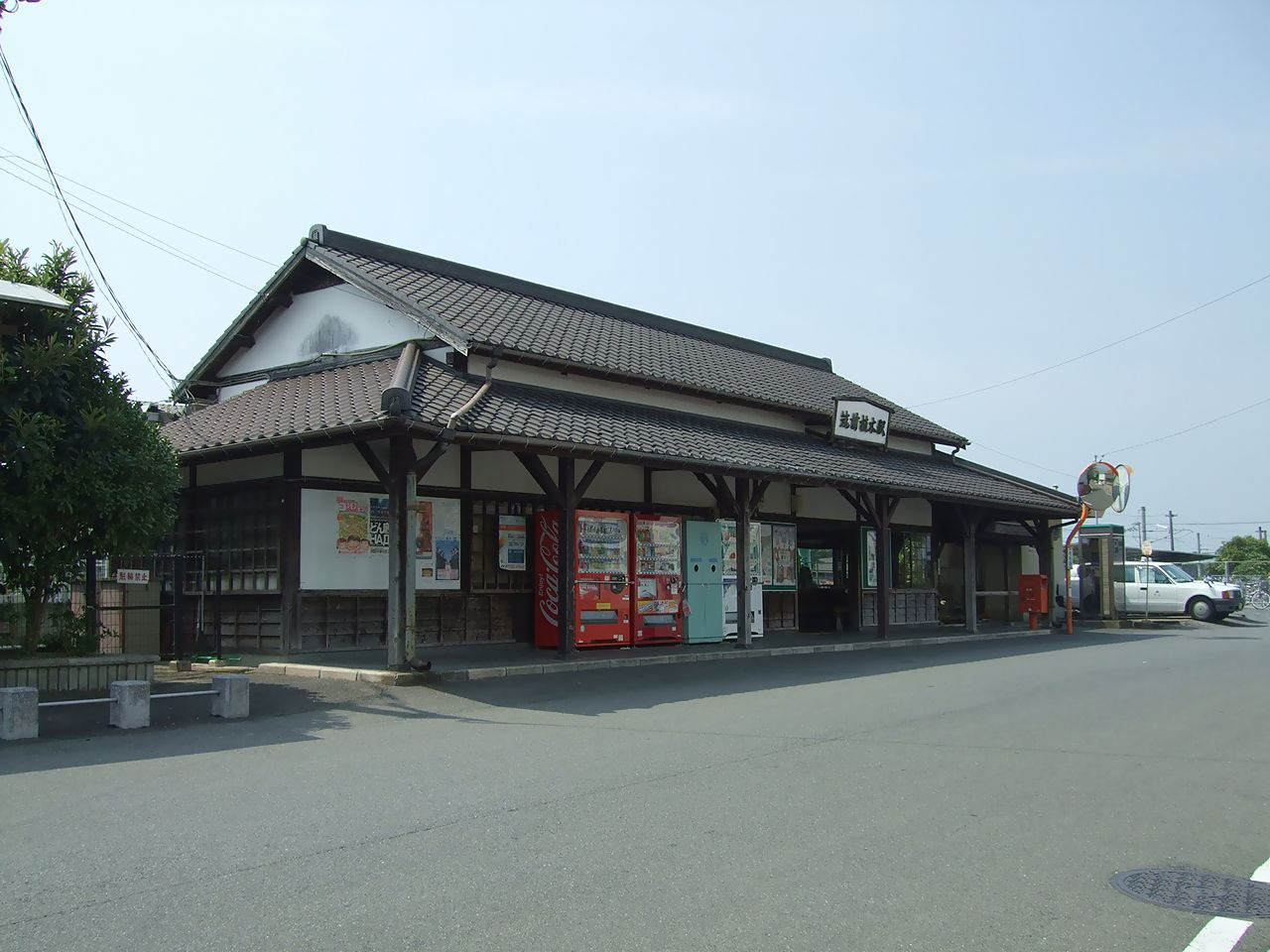
- Chikuzen-Ueki Station in 2009

General information
- Location: Ueki, Nōgata-shi, Fukuoka-ken 822-0031; Japan
- Coordinates: 33°46′35″N 130°42′30″E
- Operator: JR Kyushu
- Line: JC Chikuhō Main Line
- Distance: 21.2 km from Wakamatsu
- Platforms: 2 side platforms
- Tracks: 2

Construction
- Structure type: At grade
- Accessible: No - platforms linked by footbridge

Other information
- Status: Remotely managed station
- Website: Official website

History
- Opened: 20 December 1893
- Former names: Ueki (until 1 October 1897)

Passengers
- FY2020: 410 daily
- Rank: 239th (among JR Kyushu stations)

Services
Preceding station	JR Kyushu	Following station
Kurate towards Haruda	Chikuhō Main Line Local	Shinnyū towards Wakamatsu
Location
- Location within Fukuoka Prefecture Location within Japan

Chikuzen-Ueki Station (筑前植木駅, Chikuzen-Ueki-eki) is a passenger railway station located in the city of Nōgata, Fukuoka Prefecture, Japan. It is operated by JR Kyushu.

== Lines ==
The station is served by the Chikuhō Main Line and is located 21.2 km from the starting point of the line at Wakamatsu.

== Station layout ==
The station consists of two side platforms serving two tracks. A station building, of traditional design houses a waiting room and automatic ticket vending machines. The side platforms are not opposed. The side platform across the tracks from the station building was originally an island but track 2 has been removed, leaving the track on the far side. The platforms are linked by a covered footbridge.

=== Platforms ===
1	■ JC Chikuhō Main Line	for Nōgata, Shin-Iizuka
2	■ JC Chikuhō Main Line	for Orio, Wakamatsu

== History ==
The privately run Chikuhō Kogyō Railway had opened a line from Wakamatsu to Nōgata on 30 August 1891. The station was opened with the name "Ueki" on 20 December 1893 as an additional station on this stretch of track. On 1 October 1897, the Chikuhō Kogyō Railway, now renamed the Chikuho Railway, merged with the Kyushu Railway. The station was renamed Chikuzen-Ueki on the same day. After the Kyushu Railway was nationalized on 1 July 1907, Japanese Government Railways (JGR) took over control of the station. On 12 October 1909, the station became part of the Chikuhō Main Line. With the privatization of Japanese National Railways (JNR), the successor of JGR, on 1 April 1987, control of the station passed to JR Kyushu.

On 4 March 2017, Chikuzen-Ueki, along with several other stations on the line, became a remotely managed "Smart Support Station". Under this scheme, although the station is unstaffed, passengers using the automatic ticket vending machines or ticket gates can receive assistance via intercom from staff at a central support centre which is located at Nakama.

== Passenger statistics ==
In fiscal 2020, the station was used by a daily average of 410 boarding passengers, making it the 239th busiest station on the JR Kyushu network.。

== Surrounding area ==
- Miyama Shrine
- Kyushu Expressway Nogata Parking Area (Nogata Bus Stop)
- Yamada River
- Nogata City Ueki Elementary School

== See also ==
- List of railway stations in Japan
