= Shin'okoku =

Shin'okoku (秦王国, lit. 'Kingdom of Shin'o') is the name of a country or location that appears in the book of Sui as being in the region of Wa.

== Outline ==
The Shin'okoku (秦王国) appears in the book of Sui in volume 81, which mentions the Japanese missions to Sui China brought by Japanese envoys to the Sui dynasty sent by king Tarishihiko to Emperor Yang of Sui; the visit was reciprocated by the Sui dynasty, whose envoy passed by a location named Shin'okoku. The visit is also mentioned in the History of the Northern Dynasties in volume 94.

In the next year, the king sent Pei Qing, a royal official, to Wa, passing through Baekje, reaching Jukdo, going south to Tamna, through Tsushima, in the middle of the sea, and going east towards Iki island, and then to Tsukushi, and then east to the Shin'okoku, whose people were the same as Huaxia, and who thought that barbarians could not be understood. — Book of Sui, Volume 81

The precise location of the region is unknown. In Japan in the Official Histories of China, Ishihara Michihiro covered multiple hypothesis: Mirin Matsushita suggested it was Itsukushima, while Yasue Yamada suggested it was a corruption of the similar sounding Suō to Shin'o; it could also be related to the Hata Clan (秦氏) in the western part of the Chūgoku region.

== See also ==
- Toyo Province
- Hata clan
- Ikikoku
- Chikushikoku
