= Futajima Station =

Railway station in Kitakyushu, Japan

JE 03 Futajima Station 二島駅
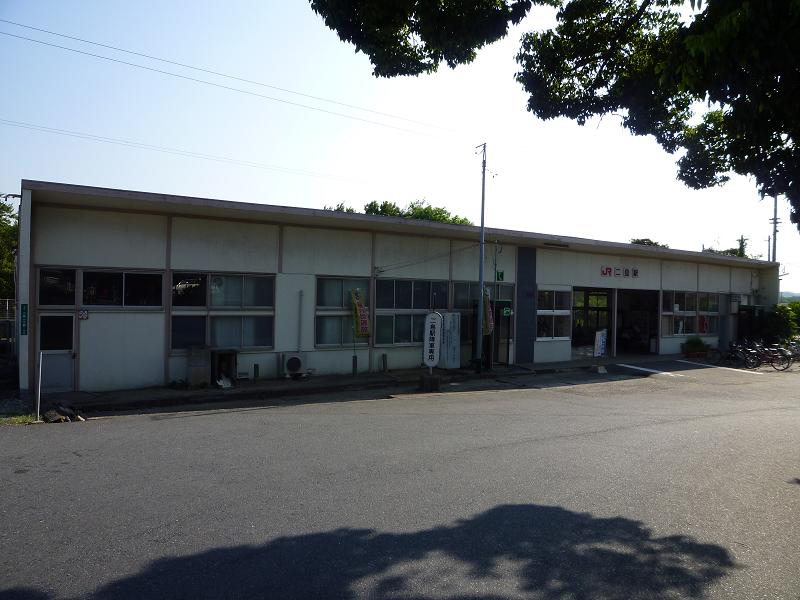
- Futajima Station

General information
- Location: 1-1-1 Futajima, Wakamatsu-ku, Kitakyūshū-shi, Fukuoka-ken 808-0103; Japan
- Coordinates: 33°53′22.87″N 130°44′54.29″E
- Operator: JR Kyushu
- Line: JE Wakamatsu Line (Chikuhō Main Line)
- Platforms: 2 side platforms
- Tracks: 2
- Connections: Bus stop

Construction
- Structure type: At grade

Other information
- Station code: JE03

History
- Opened: 5 August 1899; 127 years ago

Passengers
- FY2021: 1,204 daily (boarding only)
- Rank: 122nd (among JR Kyushu stations)

Services
Preceding station	JR Kyushu	Following station
Honjō JE 02 towards Orio	Chikuhō Main Line (Wakamatsu Line) Local	Oku-Dōkai JE 04 towards Wakamatsu
Location
- Location within Fukuoka Prefecture Location within Japan

Futajima Station (二島駅, Futajima-eki) is a railway station on the Kyūshū Railway Company (JR Kyūshū) Chikuhō Main Line (also known as the Wakamatsu Line) in Wakamatsu-ku, Kitakyushu, Fukuoka Prefecture, Japan.

== Lines ==
The station is served by the Wakamatsu Line (Chikuhō Main Line) and is located 6.3 km from the starting point of the line at Wakamatsu.

== Station layout ==
The station consists of two opposed side platforms connected by a footbridge. the station is unattended.

=== Platforms ===
1	■ Wakamatsu Line (Chikuhō Main Line)	for Wakamatsu
2	■ Wakamatsu Line (Chikuhō Main Line)	for Orio, Nakama, and Nōgata

== History ==
The station was opened on 5 August 1899 on the Kyushu Railway. The Kyushu Railway was nationalized on 1 July 1907, Japanese Government Railways (JGR) took over control of the station. On 12 October 1909, the station became part of the Chikuho Main Line. With the privatization of Japanese National Railways (JNR), the successor of JGR, on 1 April 1987, control of the station passed to JR Kyushu.

On 4 March 2017, Futajima, along with several other stations on the line, became a "Smart Support Station". Under this scheme, although the station is unstaffed, passengers using the automatic ticket vending machines or ticket gates can receive assistance via intercom from staff at a central support centre which is located at Nakama.

== Passenger statistics ==
In fiscal 2020, the station was used by a daily average of 1040 boarding passengers, making it the 129th busiest station on the JR Kyushu network.。

== Surrounding area ==
It is the westernmost train station among four stations in Wakamatsu-ku, all of those are on the Chikuho Main Line

- Fukuoka Prefectural Wakamatsu Commercial High School
- Kitakyushu City Futajima Junior High School

+Kitakyushu City Futajima Elementary School

- Japan National Route 199

== See also ==
- List of railway stations in Japan
