= Honjō Station (Fukuoka) =

Railway station in Kitakyushu, Japan

JE 02 Honjō Station 本城駅
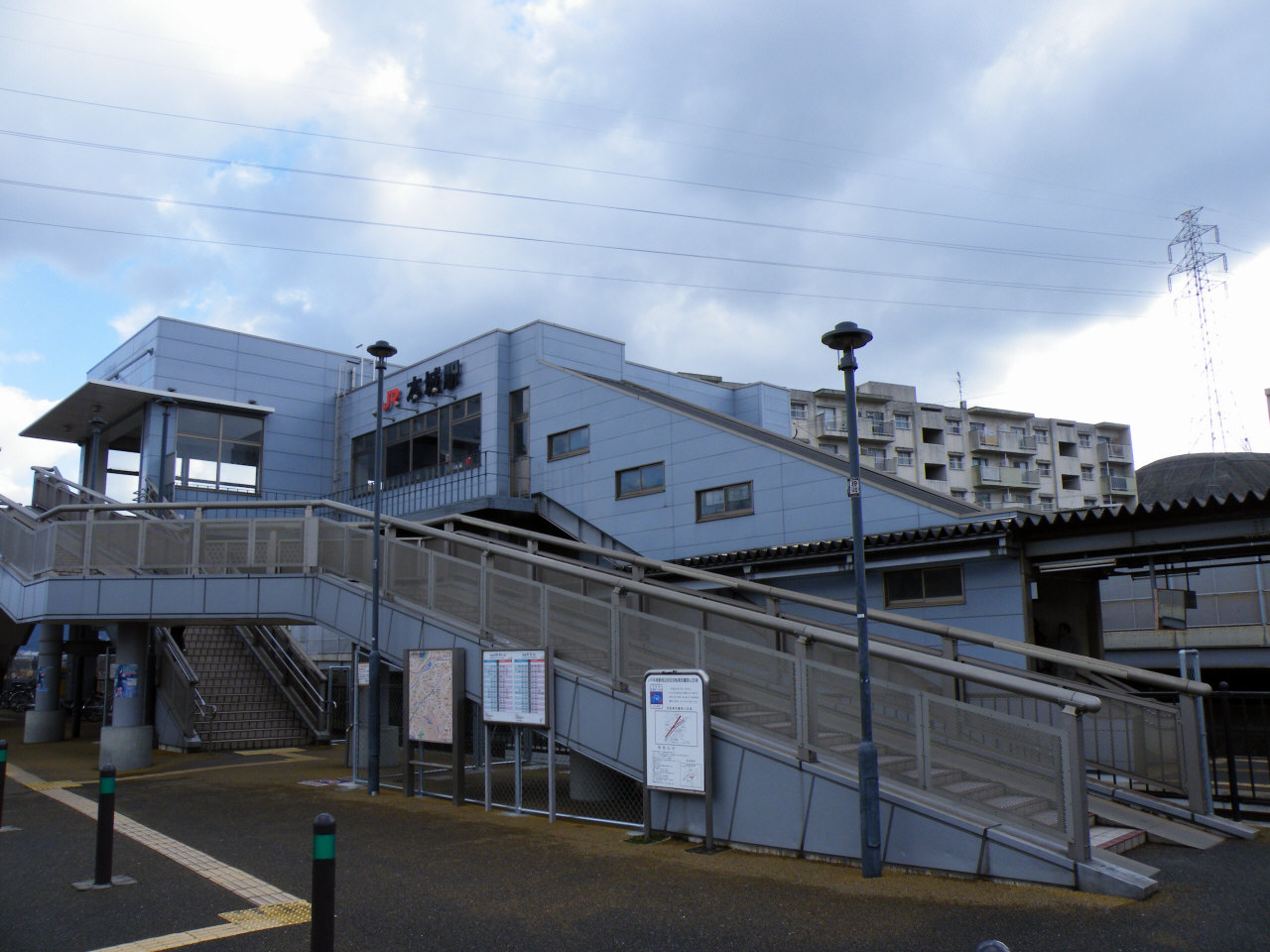
- Honjō Station in 2009

General information
- Location: 25-14 Rikimaru-machi, Yahatanishi Ward, Kitakyushu City, Fukuoka Prefecture; Japan
- Coordinates: 33°52′30″N 130°43′22″E
- Operator: JR Kyushu
- Line: JE Wakamatsu Line (Chikuhō Main Line)
- Distance: 9.3 km (5.8 mi) from Wakamatsu
- Platforms: 1 island platform
- Tracks: 2

Construction
- Structure type: At grade
- Cycle facilities: Bike shed
- Accessible: Yes - elevators serve hashigami station

Other information
- Status: Remotely managed station
- Website: Official website

History
- Opened: 15 March 2003; 23 years ago

Passengers
- FY2021: 915 daily (boarding only)
- Rank: 134th (among JR Kyushu stations)

Services
Preceding station	JR Kyushu	Following station
Orio JE 01 Terminus	Chikuhō Main Line (Wakamatsu Line) Local	Futajima JE 03 towards Wakamatsu
Location
- Location within Fukuoka Prefecture Location within Kyushu Location within Japan

Honjō Station (本城駅, Honjō-eki) is a railway station on the Chikuhō Main Line (on the section also known as the Wakamatsu Line) in Yahatanishi-ku, Kitakyushu, Fukuoka Prefecture, Fukuoka Prefecture, Japan.

== Lines ==
The station is served by the Chikuhō Main Line and is located 9.3 km from the starting point of the line at Wakamatsu.

== Station layout ==
The station consists of an island platform serving two tracks. The station building is a hashigami structure where the passenger facilities (a waiting room, automatic ticket vending machines and ticket gates) are located on the second level on a bridge which links to the platform. The bridge also serves as a pedestrian crossing, linking the streets on both sides of the tracks. Access to the second level of the hashigami structure is by flights of steps or elevators. A bike shed is provided outside the station.

== Station layout ==
1	■ Wakamatsu Line (Chikuhō Main Line)	for Futajima and Wakamatsu
2	■ Wakamatsu Line (Chikuhō Main Line)	for Orio, Nakama, and Nōgata

== History ==
The station was opened by JR Kyushu on 15 March 2003 as an additional station on the existing Chikuhō Main Line track.

On 4 March 2017, Honjō, along with several other stations on the line, became a remotely managed "Smart Support Station". Under this scheme, although the station is unstaffed, passengers using the automatic ticket vending machines or ticket gates can receive assistance via intercom from staff at a central support centre which is located at Nakama.

== Passenger statistics ==
In fiscal 2016, the station was used by an average of 1,290 passengers daily (boarding passengers only), and it ranked 134th among the busiest stations of JR Kyushu.

== Surrounding area ==
The station is surrounded by city-owned danchi apartment blocks. National Route 199 lies immediately northwest of the station. Other points of interest include:

- Honjō Athletic Stadium – 2 km northeast
- University of Occupational and Environmental Health Japan – 1 km northwest
- Kitakyushu Science and Research Park – 3 km north

The nearest bus stops for Kitakyushu City Buses are each approximately 500 meters from the north exit.

- Rikimaru-machi (力丸町), located northeast of the station
- Ōura-Itchōme (大浦1丁目), located southwest of the station

There is also a taxi stand outside the station's north exit.
