= Kurate Station =

Railway station in Kurate, Fukuoka Prefecture, Japan

JC 22 Kurate Station 鞍手駅
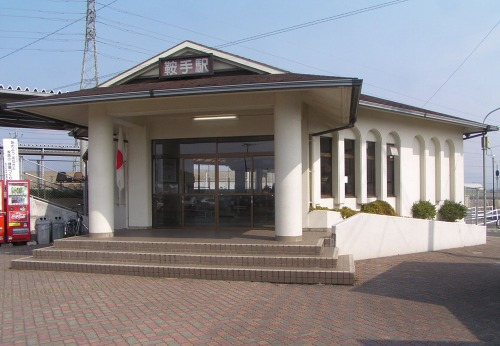
- Kurate Station in 2007

General information
- Location: Omaki, Kurate, Kurate-gun, Fukuoka-ken 807-1311; Japan
- Coordinates: 33°47′52″N 130°41′58″E
- Operator: JR Kyushu
- Line: JC Chikuhō Main Line
- Distance: 18.7 km from Wakamatsu
- Platforms: 2 side platforms
- Tracks: 2

Construction
- Structure type: At grade
- Parking: Available
- Accessible: No - platforms linked by footbridge

Other information
- Status: Remotely managed station
- Website: Official website

History
- Opened: 1 July 1987

Passengers
- FY2020: 530 daily
- Rank: 209th (among JR Kyushu stations)

Services
Preceding station	JR Kyushu	Following station
Chikuzen-Ueki towards Haruda	Chikuhō Main Line Local	Chikuzen-Habu towards Wakamatsu
Location
- Location within Fukuoka Prefecture Location within Japan

Kurate Station (鞍手駅, Kurate-eki) is a passenger railway station located in the town of Kurate, Fukuoka Prefecture, Japan. It is operated by JR Kyushu.

== Lines ==
The station is served by the Chikuhō Main Line and is located 18.7 km from the starting point of the line at Wakamatsu.

== Station layout ==
The station consists of two side platforms serving two tracks. The platforms are not opposed. The tracks run on the east side of each platform. A station building of modern concrete design houses a waiting room and automatic ticket vending machines. Access to the opposite side platform is by means of a sheltered footbridge.

=== Platforms ===
1	■ JC Chikuhō Main Line	for Orio, Wakamatsu
2	■ JC Chikuhō Main Line	for Nōgata, Shin-Iizuka

== History ==
The station was opened by JR Kyushu on 1 July 1987 as an additional station on the existing Chikuhō Main Line track.

On 4 March 2017, Kurate, along with several other stations on the line, became a remotely managed "Smart Support Station". Under this scheme, although the station is unstaffed, passengers using the automatic ticket vending machines or ticket gates can receive assistance via intercom from staff at a central support centre which is located at Nakama.

== Passenger statistics ==
In fiscal 2020, the station was used by a daily average of 530 boarding passengers, making it the 209th busiest station on the JR Kyushu network.。

== Surrounding area ==
This station is located in the eastern part of Kurate Town, about 2 km away from the town center. The area in front of the station is deserted with only a few private houses.

- Kurate Town Hall
- Kurate Town Kenboku Elementary School
- Kurate Town Kennan Elementary School
- Kurate Town Nishikawa Elementary School

== See also ==
- List of railway stations in Japan
