= Chikuzen-Habu Station =

Railway station in Nakama, Fukuoka Prefecture, Japan

JC 23 Chikuzen-Habu Station 筑前垣生駅
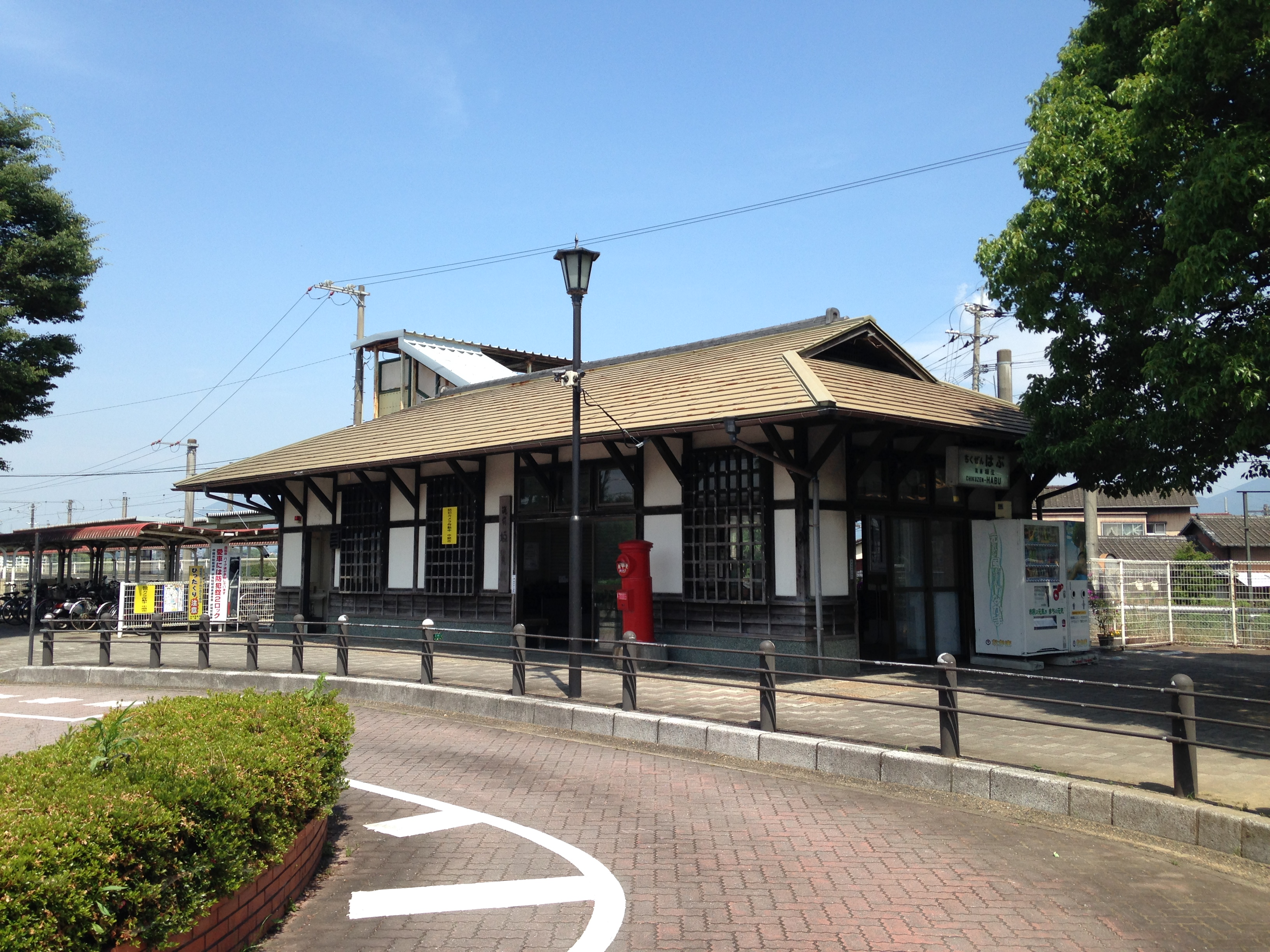
- Chikuzen-Habu in 2016

General information
- Location: Habu, Nakama-shi, Fukuoka-ken 809-0001; Japan
- Coordinates: 33°49′05″N 130°42′06″E
- Operator: JR Kyushu
- Line: JC Chikuhō Main Line
- Distance: 16.4 km from Wakamatsu
- Platforms: 1 island platform
- Tracks: 2

Construction
- Structure type: At grade
- Cycle facilities: Bike shed
- Accessible: No - platforms linked by footbridge

Other information
- Status: Remotely managed station
- Website: Official website

History
- Opened: 26 April 1935

Passengers
- FY2020: 291 daily
- Rank: 280th (among JR Kyushu stations)

Services
| Preceding station | JR Kyushu | Following station |
|---|---|---|
| Kurate towards Haruda | Chikuhō Main Line Local | Nakama towards Wakamatsu |
Location
- Location within Fukuoka Prefecture Location within Japan

Chikuzen-Habu Station (筑前垣生駅, Chikuzen-Habu-eki) is a passenger railway station located in the town of Nakama, Fukuoka Prefecture, Japan. It is operated by JR Kyushu.

== Lines ==
The station is served by the Chikuhō Main Line and is located 16.4 km from the starting point of the line at Wakamatsu.

== Station layout ==
The station consists of an island platform serving two tracks. A station building, of traditional design houses a waiting room and automatic ticket vending machines. Access to the island platform is by means of a covered footbridge. A bike shed is provided outside the station.

=== Platforms ===
| 1 | ■ JC Chikuhō Main Line | for Orio, Wakamatsu |
| 2 | ■ JC Chikuhō Main Line | for Nōgata, Shin-Iizuka |

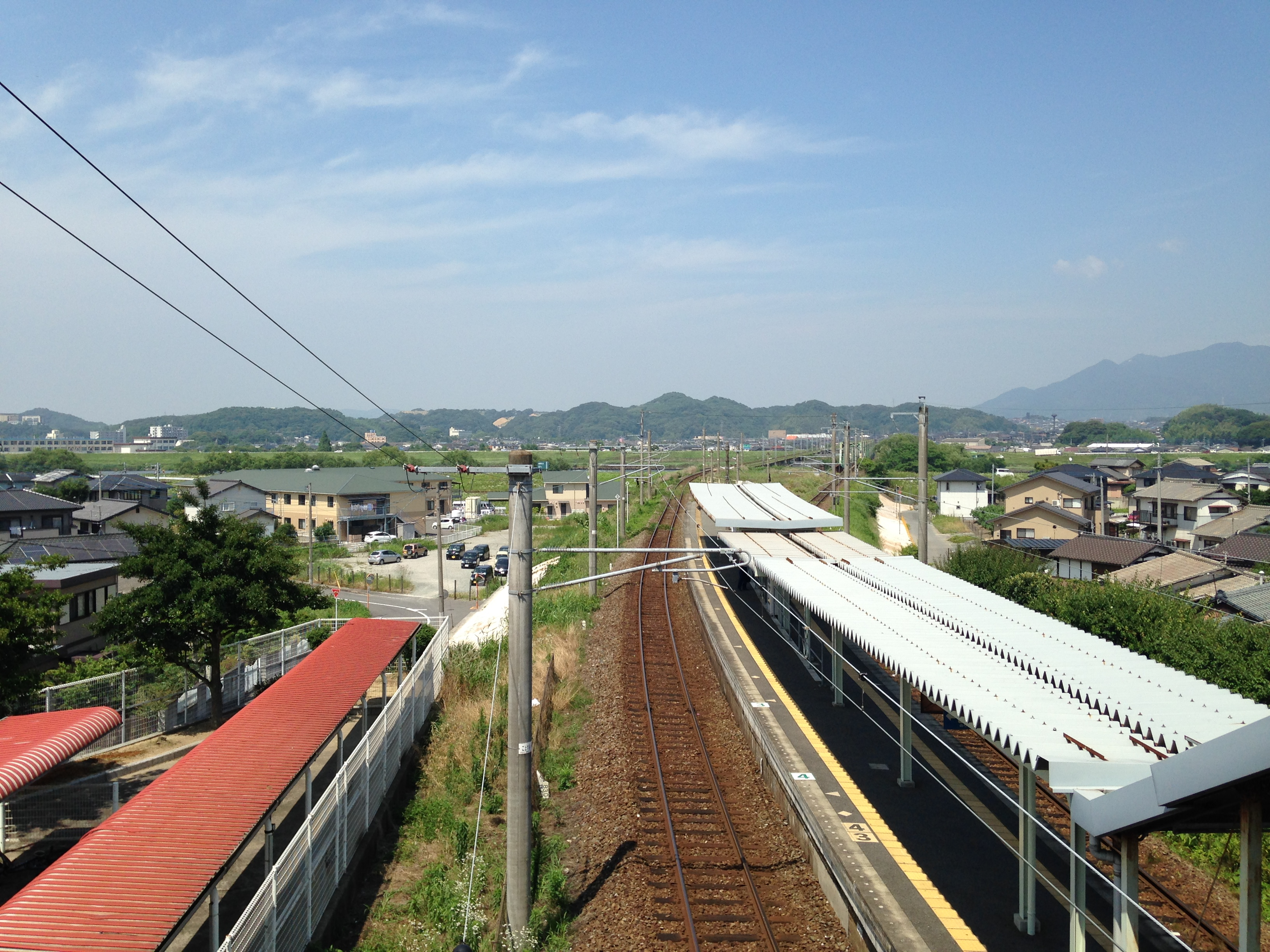
A view of the station platforms, looking towards the north.

== History ==
Japanese Government Railways (JGR) opened the station on 26 April 1935 as an additional station on the existing Chikuho Main Line track. With the privatization of Japanese National Railways (JNR), the successor of JGR, on 1 April 1987, control of the station passed to JR Kyushu.

On 4 March 2017, Chikuzen-Habu, along with several other stations on the line, became a "Smart Support Station". Under this scheme, although the station is unstaffed, passengers using the automatic ticket vending machines or ticket gates can receive assistance via intercom from staff at a central support centre which is located at Nakama.

== Passenger statistics ==
In fiscal 2020, the station was used by a daily average of 291 boarding passengers, making it the 280th busiest station on the JR Kyushu network.。

== Surrounding area ==
This station is located on the left bank of the Onga River. The surrounding area is a residential area, and Kabuki Park is right near the station. The nearest station to Nakama City Hall is this station, which is located east of the station and across Onga Bridge.

== See also ==
- List of railway stations in Japan
