= Tsukushi (protein) =

Protein-coding gene in the species Homo sapiens

TSKU

Identifiers
- Aliases: TSKU, E2IG4, LRRC54, TSK, tsukushi, small leucine rich proteoglycan
- External IDs: OMIM: 608015; MGI: 2443855; GeneCards: TSKU

Gene location (Human)
Chr.	Chromosome 11 (human)
Band	11q13.5	Start	76,782,251 bp
Band	11q13.5	End	76,798,153 bp

Gene location (Mouse)
Chr.	Chromosome 7 (mouse)
Band	7|7 E1	Start	97,999,875 bp
Band	7|7 E1	End	98,010,535 bp
RNA expression pattern
Bgee	Human / Mouse (ortholog); Top expressed in: decidua; canal of the cervix; ectocervix; left uterine tube; gastric mucosa; right lobe of liver; subcutaneous adipose tissue; vagina; skin of abdomen; tibial nerve / Top expressed in: gallbladder; respiratory epithelium; olfactory epithelium; lip; ankle joint; tail of embryo; transitional epithelium of urinary bladder; genital tubercle; duodenum; choroid plexus of fourth ventricle; More reference expression data
BioGPS	n/a
Gene ontology
Molecular function	G protein-coupled receptor activity
Cellular component	extracellular region; extracellular space; plasma membrane
Biological process	anterior commissure morphogenesis; regulation of gene expression; negative regulation of Wnt signaling pathway; corpus callosum morphogenesis; camera-type eye development; ciliary body morphogenesis; lateral ventricle development; adenylate cyclase-modulating G protein-coupled receptor signaling pathway
Sources:Amigo / QuickGO
Orthologs
Databases	NCBI: entry; OMA: entry
Species	Human	Mouse
Entrez	25987	244152
Ensembl	ENSG00000182704	ENSMUSG00000049580
UniProt	Q8WUA8	Q8CBR6
RefSeq (mRNA)	NM_001258210; NM_015516; NM_001318477; NM_001318478; NM_001318479	NM_001024619; NM_001168539; NM_001168540; NM_001168541
RefSeq (protein)	NP_001245139; NP_001305406; NP_001305407; NP_001305408; NP_056331	NP_001019790; NP_001162011; NP_001162012; NP_001162013
Location (UCSC)	Chr 11: 76.78 – 76.8 Mb	Chr 7: 98 – 98.01 Mb
PubMed search
- Wikidata
View/Edit Human	View/Edit Mouse

Tsukushi or tsukushin is an extracellular matrix protein of the small leucine rich proteoglycan (SLRP) family. In humans it is encoded by the TSKU gene.

Tsukushi is a non-canonical class IV SLRP. It is involved in early animal development.
