= Chikuzen Province =

Former province of Japan

Map of Japanese provinces (1868) with Chikuzen Province highlighted

Chikuzen Province (筑前国, Chikuzen no Kuni; Japanese pronunciation: [c̟͡ɕi̥.kɯ̈́.(d͡)zè̞ɴ̀, -(d͡)zè̞ǹ nò̞ kɯ̈̀.ɲ̟ì]) was a province of Japan in the area of northern Kyushu, corresponding to part of north and western Fukuoka Prefecture. Chikuzen bordered on Hizen to the west, and Buzen east, and Bungo to the southeast. Its abbreviated form name was Chikushū (筑州) (a name which it shared with Chikugo Province), although it was also called Chikuyō (筑陽). In terms of the Gokishichidō system, Chikuzen was one of the provinces of the Saikaidō circuit. Under the Engishiki classification system, Chikuzen was ranked as one of the "superior countries" (上国) in terms of importance, and one of the "far countries" (遠国) in terms of distance from the capital.

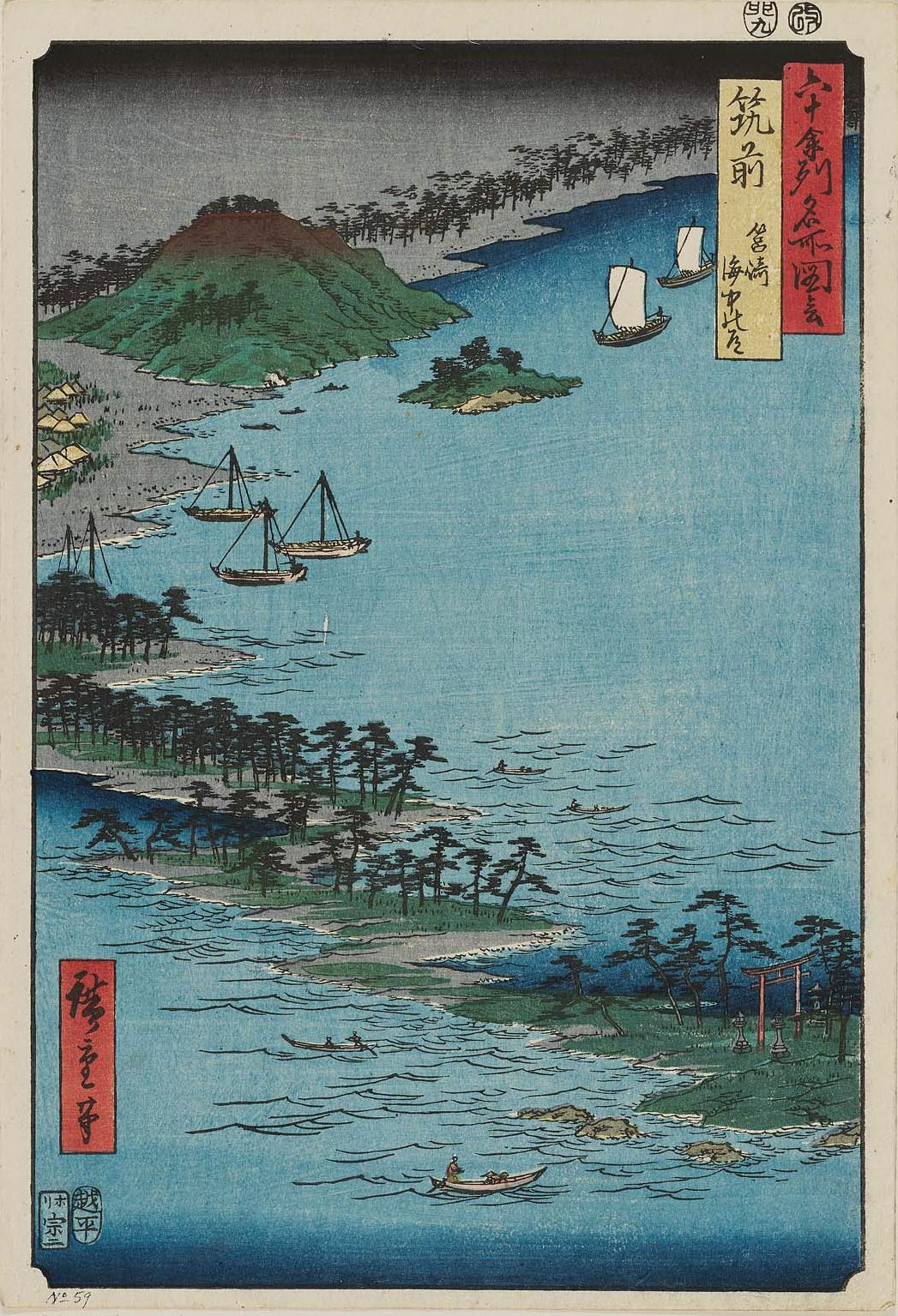
Hiroshige ukiyo-e "Chikuzen" in "The Famous Scenes of the Sixty States" (六十余州名所図会), depicting the Hakozaki in Chkuzen Province in 1855

== History ==
Ancient Tsukushi Province was a major power center in the Yayoi period, with contacts to the Asian mainland and may have been the site for the Kingdom of Yamatai mentioned in official Chinese dynastic Twenty-Four Histories for the 1st- and 2nd-century Eastern Han dynasty, the 3rd-century Records of the Three Kingdoms, and the 6th-century Book of Sui. During the Kofun period, many burial mounds were constructed and the area was ruled by a powerful clan who held the title of "Tsukushi no kuni no miyatsuko". The semi-legendary 14th ruler of Japan, Emperor Chūai is said to have had a palace in Chikuzen at what is now the Kashii-gū shrine. The area was the launching point for Empress Jingū's purported conquest of Korea, and was the settlement area for many Toraijin immigrants such as the famous Hata clan. In 527, the Iwai Rebellion between rival factions supporting Silla against Yamato rule occurred. In 531, the priest Zensho arrived from Northern Wei and established Shugendo. In 663, the Yamato government, which was defeated by the combined Silla and Tang China forces at the Battle of Hakusonko, decided to establish Dazaifu as a regional military and civil administrative center, and after the Taika Reforms and the establishment of the Ritsuryō system in 701, Tsukushi Province was divided into Chikuzen and Chikugo Provinces.

The kokufu of Chikuzen is believed to have been located in what is now part of the city of Dazaifu, although its exact location has not yet been discovered. The ruins of the Chikuzen Kokubun-ji are located in the same area, and are a National Historic Site. The ichinomiya of Chikuzen Province is Sumiyoshi Shrine, located in Hakata-ku, Fukuoka, although the early records of the province indicate that Hakozaki Shrine was the ichinomiya.

At the end of the 13th century, Chikuzen was the landing point for a Mongol invasion force. But the main force was destroyed by a typhoon (later called kamikaze).

In April 1336, Kikuchi Taketoshi attacked the Shoni clan stronghold at Dazaifu. At the time, the Shoni were allied with Ashikaga Takauji in his battles against Go-Daigo. The Shoni were defeated, which led to the suicide of several clan members, including their leader Shoni Sadatsune.

Chikuzen in the Edo period was almost entirely under the control of Fukuoka Domain, ruled by the Kuroda clan to the Meiji restoration.

Bakumatsu period domains
Name	Clan	Type	kokudaka
Fukuoka	Kuroda	Tozama	523,000 koku
Akizuki	Kuroda	Tozama	50,000 koku

In the Meiji period, the provinces of Japan were converted into prefectures. However, the name of the province continued to exist for some purposes. For example, Chikuzen is explicitly recognized in treaties in 1894 (a) between Japan and the United States and (b) between Japan and the United Kingdom. It also persists in features such as the Chikuhō Main Line (JR Kyushu) and stations Chikuzen Habu and Chikuzen Ueki. The adjacent Haruda Line includes Chikuzen Uchino and Chikuzen Yamae stations, reflecting the region in the time the rail networks were established.

Per the early Meiji period Kyudaka kyuryo Torishirabe-chō (旧高旧領取調帳), an official government assessment of the nation's resources, Chikuzen Province had 862 villages with a total kokudaka of 633,434 koku. Chikuzen Province consisted of:

Districts of Chikugo Province
District	kokudaka	villages	Controlled by	Notes
Kasuya District (糟屋郡)	62,854 koku	85 villages	Fukuoka	
Munakata District (宗像郡)	56,306 koku	60 villages	Fukuoka	dissolved
Onga District (遠賀郡)	54,956 koku	85 villages	Fukuoka	
Kurate District (鞍手郡)	60,628 koku	68 villages	Fukuoka	
Honami District (穂波郡)	38,103 koku	61 villages	Fukuoka, Akizuki	merged with Kama District to become Kaho District (嘉穂郡) on February 26, 1896
Kama District (嘉麻郡)	56,306 koku	60 villages	Fukuoka, Akizuki	merged with Honami District to become Kaho District on February 26, 1896
Johza District (上座郡)	25,596 koku	34 villages	Fukuoka	merged with Geza and Yasu Districts to become Asakura District (朝倉郡) on February 26, 1896
Geza District (下座郡)	21,436 koku	44 villages	Fukuoka, Akizuki	merged with Johza and Yasu Districts to become Asakura District (朝倉郡) on February 26, 1896
Yasu District (夜須郡)	40,286 koku	54 villages	Fukuoka, Akizuki	merged with Geza and Johza Districts to become Asakura District on February 26, 1896
Mikasa District (御笠郡)	37,512 koku	57 villages	Fukuoka	merged with Mushiroda and Naka Districts to become Chikushi District (筑紫郡) on February 26, 1896
Naka District (那珂郡)	42,611 koku	70 villages	Fukuoka	merged with Mikasa and Mushiroda Districts to become Chikushi District on February 26, 1896
Mushiroda District (席田郡)	9,899 koku	9 villages	Fukuoka	merged with Mikasa and Naka Districts to become Chikushi District on February 26, 1896
Sawara District (早良郡)	45,153 koku	53 villages	Fukuoka	dissolved
Shima District (早良郡)	44,058 koku	48 villages	Fukuoka	merged with Ito District to become Itoshima District on February 26, 1896
Ito District (怡土郡郡)	47,681 koku	71 villages	Fukuoka	merged with Shima District to become Itoshima District (糸島郡) on February 26, 1896

== Gallery ==
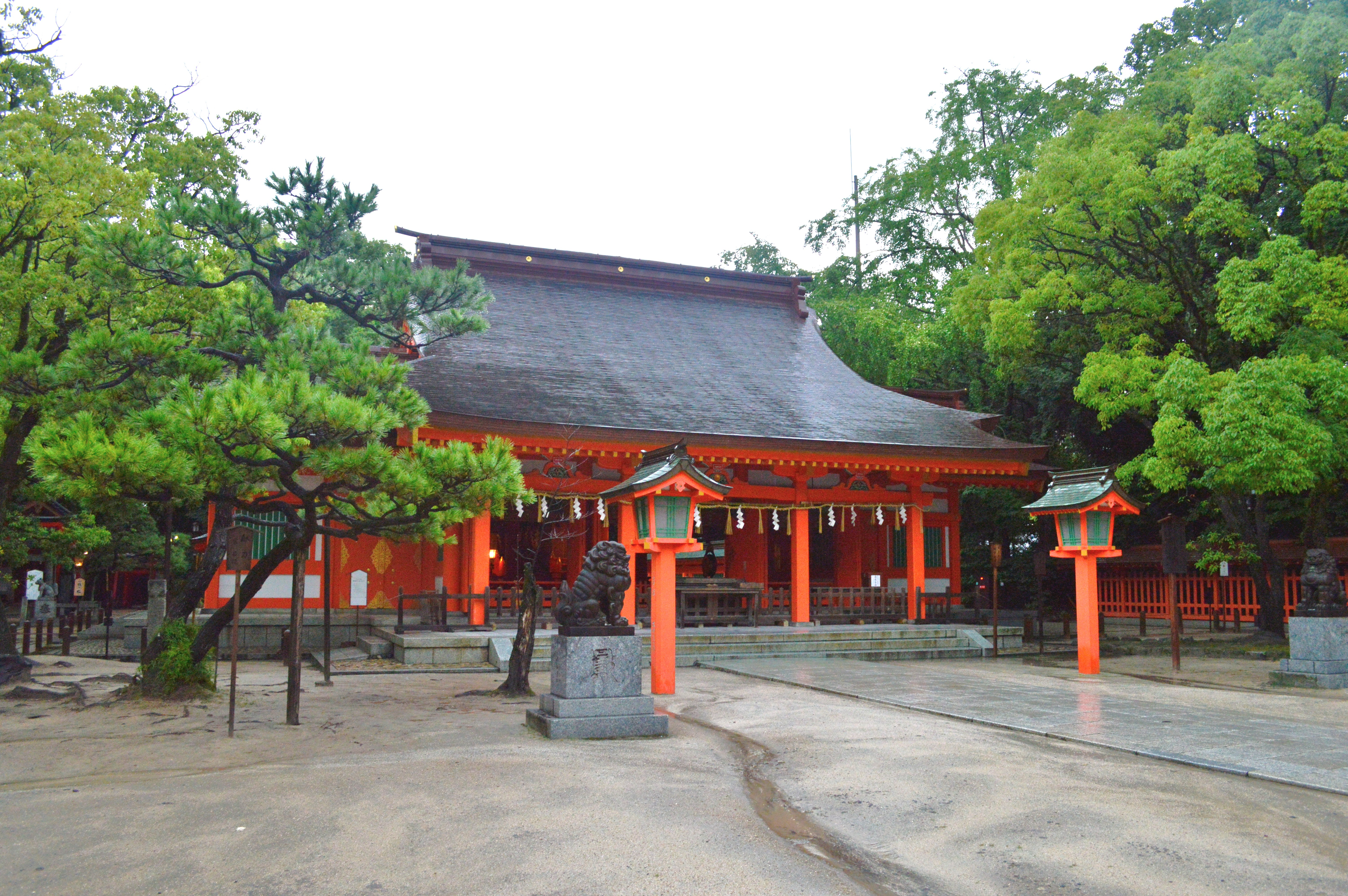
Sumiyoshi, the ichinomiya of the province

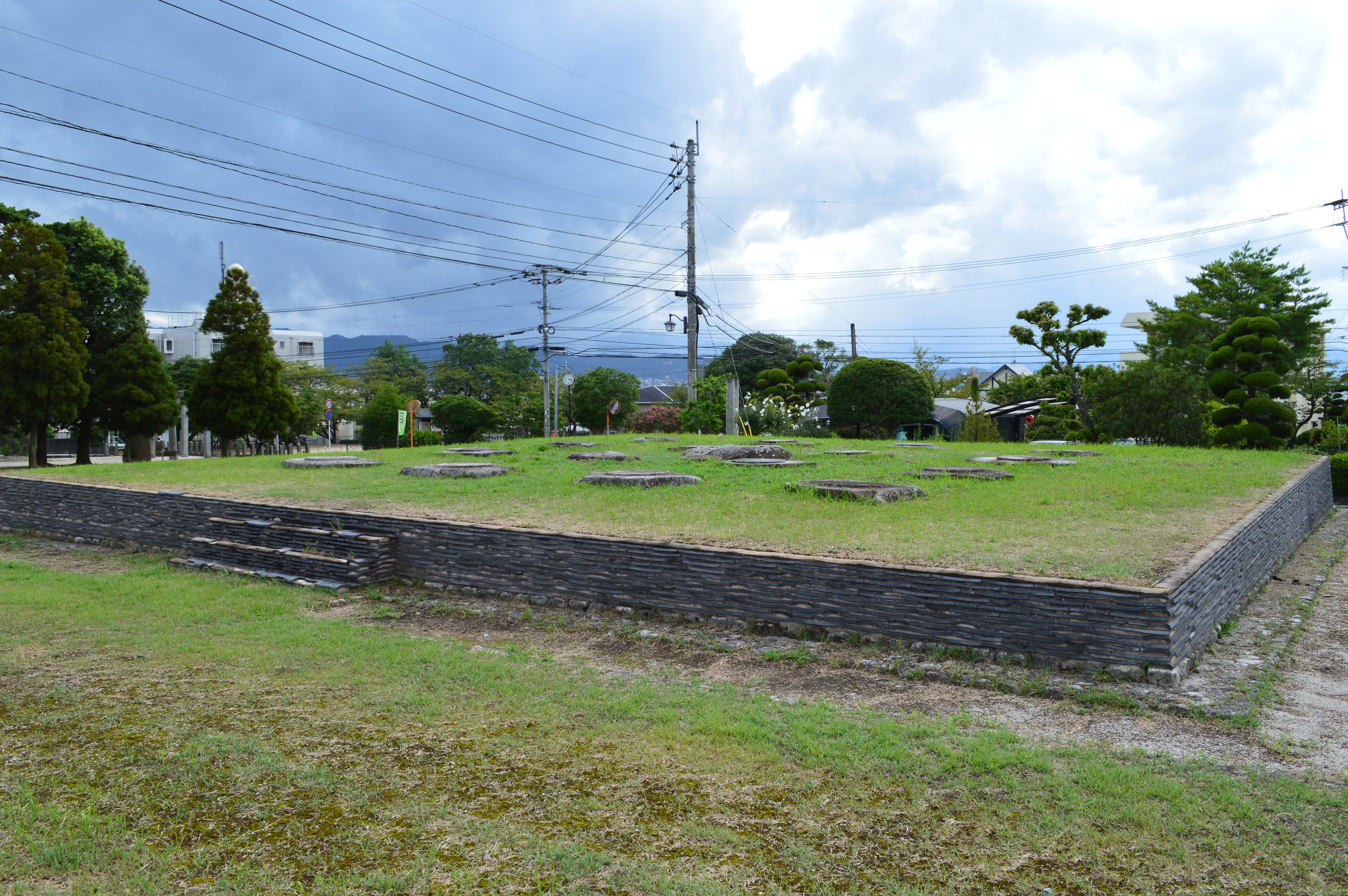
Site of the Chikuzen Kokubun-ji

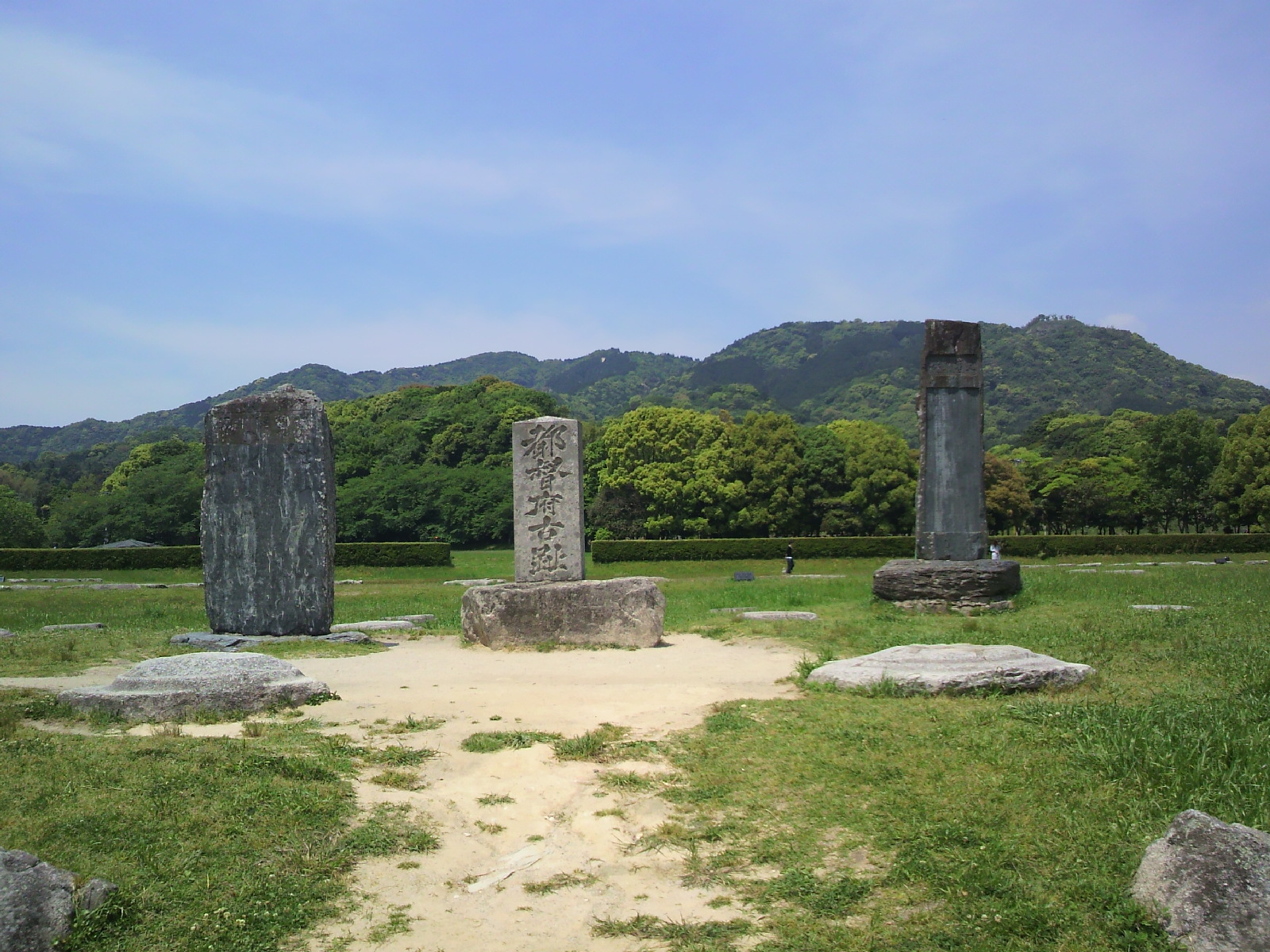
Site of Dazaifu

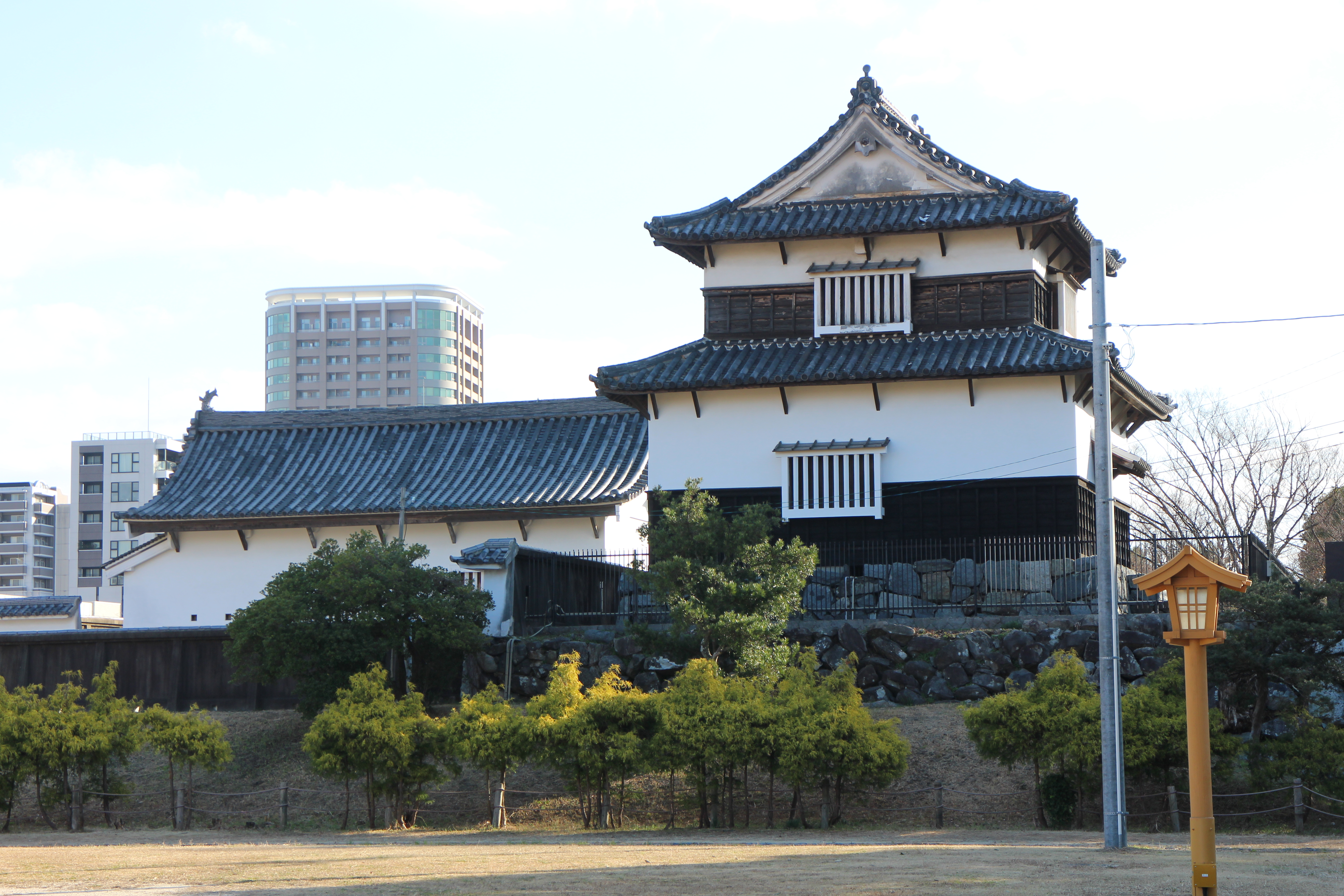
Fukuoka Castle

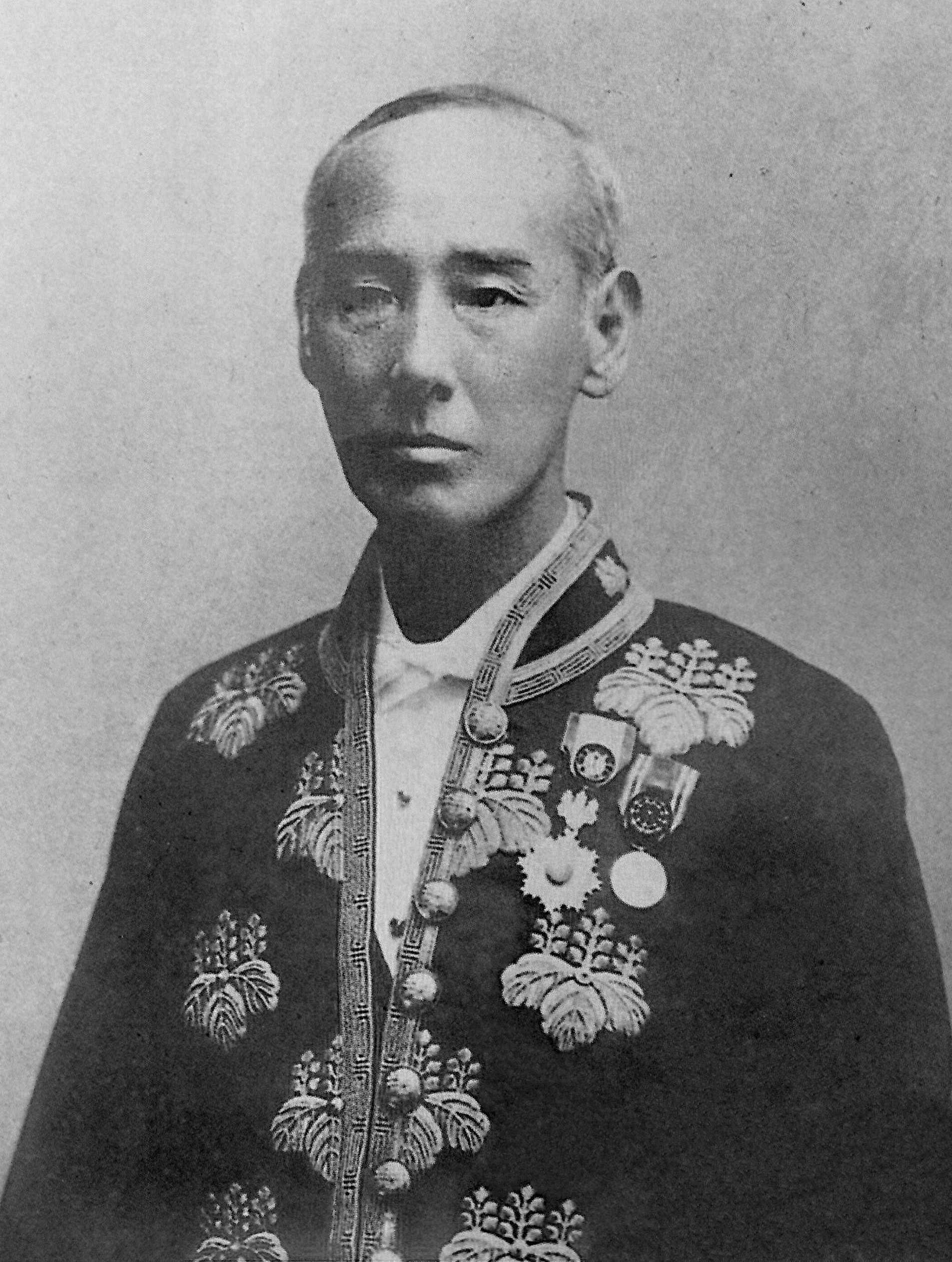
Kuroda Nagatomo, final daimyō of Fukuoka Domain
