= Tsukushi Province =

Former province of Japan

Tsukushi Province (筑紫国, Tsukushi-no kuni) was an ancient province of Japan, in the area of Chikuzen and Chikugo provinces. This province was located within Fukuoka Prefecture. It was sometimes called Chikushū (筑州).
