= Nakama Station =

Railway station in Nakama, Fukuoka Prefecture, Japan

JC 24 Nakama Station 中間駅
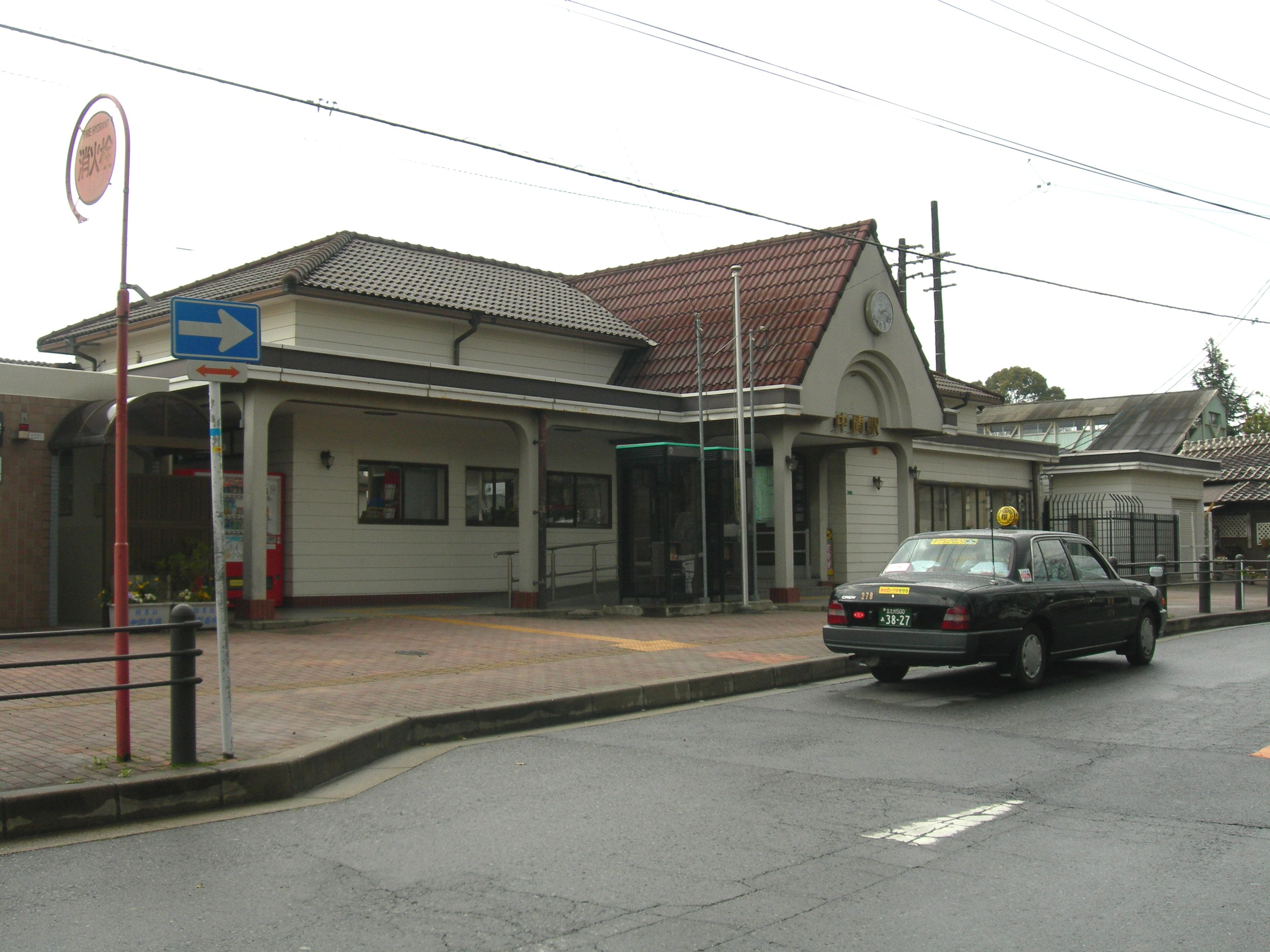
- Nakama Station in 2008

General information
- Location: 2-chōme-12 Chūō, Nakama, Fukuoka 809-0030; Japan
- Coordinates: 33°49′39″N 130°42′35″E
- Operator: JR Kyushu
- Line: JC Chikuhō Main Line
- Distance: 14.9 km from Wakamatsu
- Platforms: 1 side + 1 island platforms
- Tracks: 3 + 1 siding

Construction
- Structure type: At grade
- Parking: Available

Other information
- Status: Staffed ticket window (Midori no Madoguchi) limited hours
- Website: Official website

History
- Opened: 30 August 1891

Passengers
- FY2020: 1255 daily
- Rank: 118th (among JR Kyushu stations)

Services
Preceding station	JR Kyushu	Following station
Chikuzen-Habu towards Haruda	Chikuhō Main Line Local	Higashi-Mizumaki towards Wakamatsu
Location
- Location within Fukuoka Prefecture Location within Japan

Nakama Station (中間駅, Nakama-eki) is a passenger railway station located in the town of Nakama, Fukuoka Prefecture, Japan. It is operated by JR Kyushu.

== Lines ==
The station is served by the Chikuhō Main Line and is located 14.9 km from the starting point of the line at Wakamatsu.

== Station layout ==
The station consists of a side and an island platform serving three tracks, connected to the station building by a footbridge. A siding branches off track three. The station building houses a staffed ticket window which is open for two hours in the morning only.

=== Platforms ===
1	■ JC Chikuhō Main Line	for Kurate, Nōgata
2	■ JC Chikuhō Main Line	for Kurosaki, Kokura
3	■ JC Chikuhō Main Line	for Orio, Wakamatsu

== History ==
On 30 August 1891, the privately run Chikuho Kogyo Railway opened a line from Wakamatsu to Nōgata. On the same day, Nakama was opened as an intermediate station along this track. On 1 October 1897, the Chikuho Kogyo Railway, now renamed the Chikuho Railway, merged with the Kyushu Railway. After the Kyushu Railway was nationalized on 1 July 1907, Japanese Government Railways (JGR) took over control of the station. On 12 October 1909, the station became part of the Chikuho Main Line. With the privatization of Japanese National Railways (JNR), the successor of JGR, on 1 April 1987, control of the station passed to JR Kyushu.

On 4 March 2017, Nakama, along with several other stations on the line, became a "Smart Support Station". Under this scheme, the ticket counter opening hours at Nakama were reduced to two hours in the morning between 0630 and 0830 hours. At other times, the station would be unstaffed. Tickets would have to be purchased from automatic ticket vending machines and automatic ticket gates used to enter the platforms. Passengers requiring help would be able to communicate via intercom with staff at a central support centre which is located at Nakama itself.

== Passenger statistics ==
In fiscal 2020, the station was used by a daily average of 1255 boarding passengers, making it the 118th busiest station on the JR Kyushu network.。

== Surrounding area ==
This station is located adjacent to the Showa-machi Shopping District, which was once the downtown area of Nakama City,

== See also ==
- List of railway stations in Japan
