= Tobata Station =

Railway station in Kitakyushu, Japan

JA 25 Tobata Station 戸畑駅
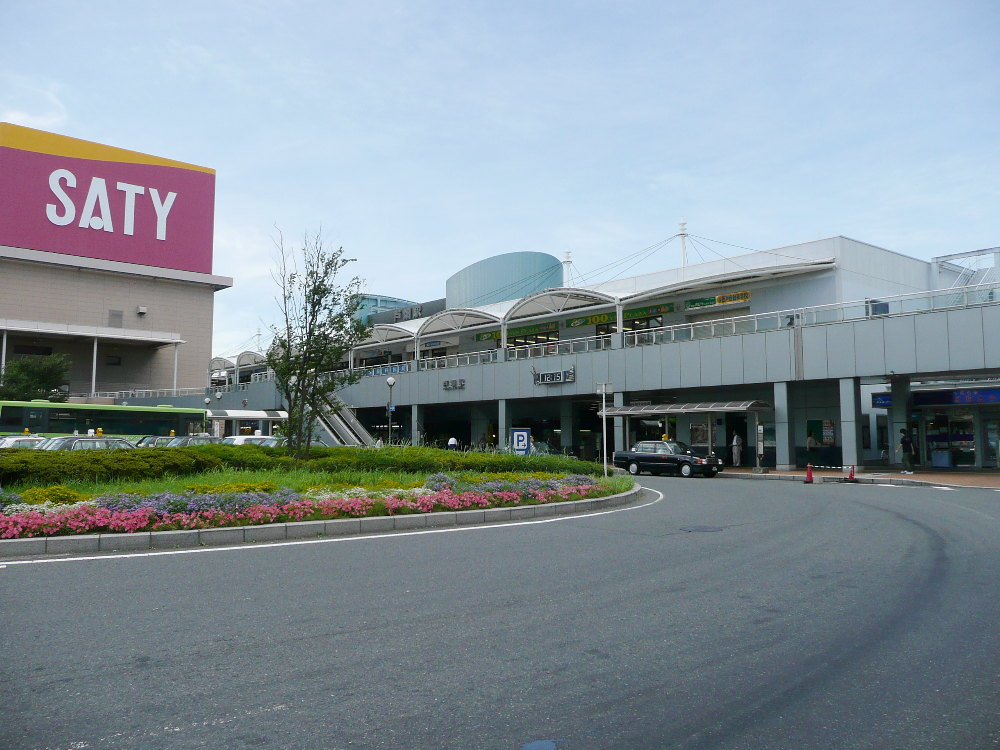
- Tobata Station

General information
- Location: 1 Shioimachi, Tobata-ku, Kitakyushu-shi, Fukuoka-ken 804-0067; Japan
- Coordinates: 33°53′50″N 130°49′14″E
- Operator: JR Kyushu
- Line: JA Kagoshima Main Line
- Distance: 17.2 km from Mojikō
- Platforms: 1 island platform

Construction
- Structure type: Embankment

Other information
- Status: Staffed (Midori no Madoguchi)
- Website: Official website

History
- Opened: 27 December 1902

Passengers
- FY2020: 7521
- Rank: 14th (among JR Kyushu stations)

Services
Preceding station	JR Kyushu	Following station
Edamitsu towards Kagoshima	Kagoshima Main Line	Kyūshūkōdaimae towards Mojikō
Location
- Location within Fukuoka Prefecture Location within Japan

Tobata Station (戸畑駅, Tobata-eki) is a passenger railway station located in Tobata-ku, Kitakyushu, Japan. It is operated by JR Kyushu.

== Lines ==
The station is served by the Kagoshima Main Line and is located 17.2 km from the starting point of the line at Mojikō.

== Layout ==
The station consists of one elevated island platform with the station building underneath. The station has a Midori no Madoguchi staffed ticket office.

=== Platforms ===
1	■ JA Kagoshima Main Line	for Kurosaki and Hakata
2	■ JA Kagoshima Main Line	for Kokura and Shimonoseki

== History ==
The privately run Kyushu Railway had begun laying down its network on Kyushu in 1889 and by November 1896 had a stretch of track from Yatsushiro northwards to Kurosaki. This stretch of track was subsequently linked up with another stretch further north from Moji (now Mojikō) to Kokura which had been laid down in 1891. The linkup was achieved on 27 December 1902, with Tobata opened on the same day as one of the intermediate stations on the new track between Kokura and Kurosaki. When the Kyushu Railway was nationalized on 1 July 1907, Japanese Government Railways (JGR) took over control of the station. On 12 October 1909, the station became part of the Hitoyoshi Main Line and then on 21 November 1909, part of the Kagoshima Main Line. With the privatization of Japanese National Railways (JNR), the successor of JGR, on 1 April 1987, JR Kyushu took over control of the station. In 2000 the station was shifted about 200 metres westwards and rebuilt.

== Passenger statistics ==
In fiscal 2020, the station was used by an average of 7521 passengers daily (boarding passengers only), and it ranked 14th among the busiest stations of JR Kyushu.

== Surrounding area ==
- Tobata Ward Office
- Tobata Kenwa Hospital
- Kitakyushu Municipal High School

== See also ==
- List of railway stations in Japan
