= Einomaru Station =

Railway station in Kitakyushu, Fukuoka prefecture, Japan

Einomaru Station 永犬丸駅
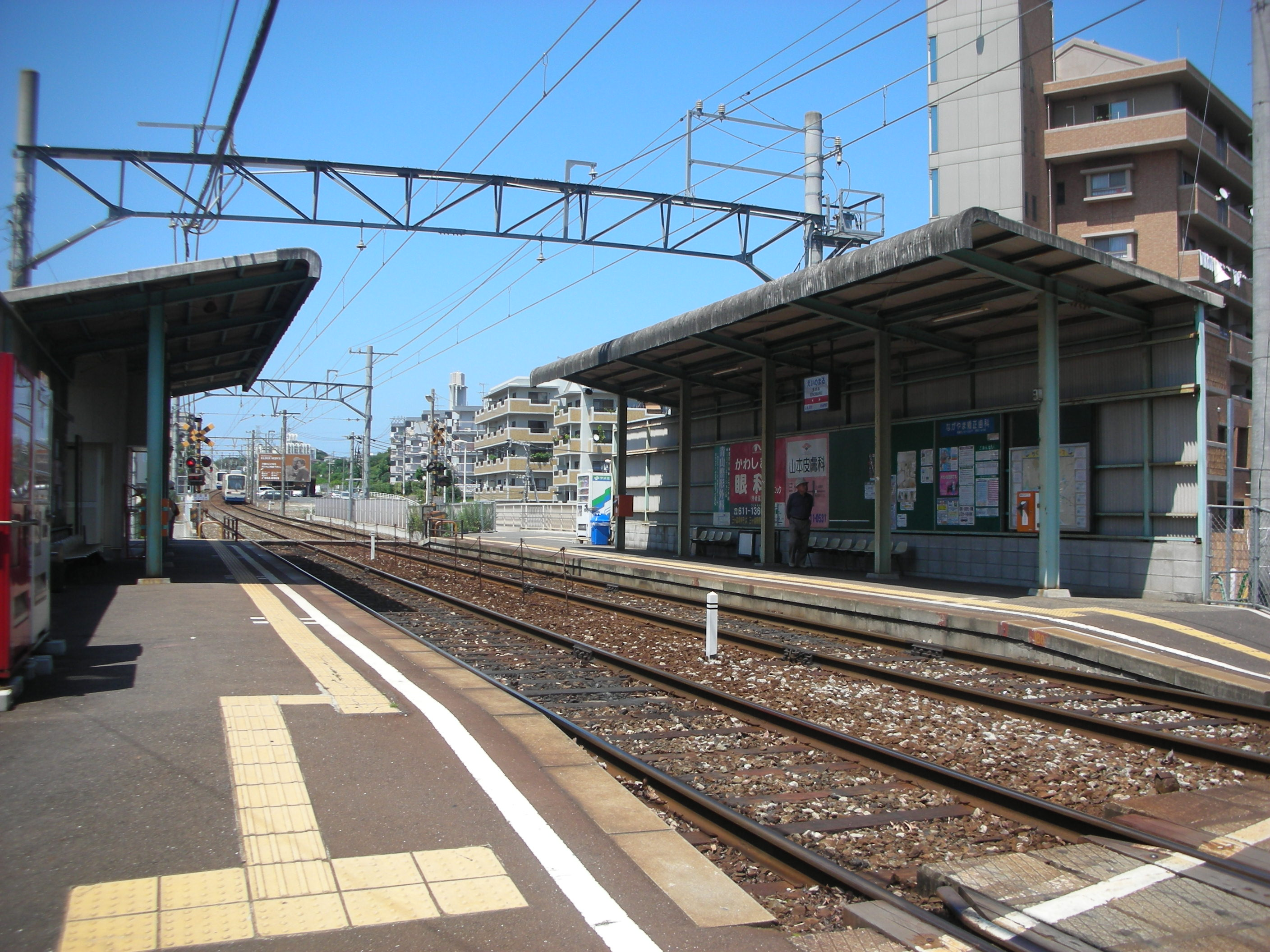
- Einomaru Station platform

General information
- Location: 1-chōme-1 Satonaka, Yahatanishi Ward, Kitakyushu-shi, Fukuoka-ken 807-0846; Japan
- Coordinates: 33°50′19.61″N 130°44′16.85″E
- Operator: Chikuhō Electric Railroad
- Line: ■ Chikuhō Electric Railroad Line
- Platforms: 2 side platforms

Other information
- Station code: CK 08
- Website: Official website

History
- Opened: 25 March 1956

Passengers
- FY2021: 965
Location
- Location within Fukuoka Prefecture Location within Japan

Einomaru Station (永犬丸駅, Einomaru-eki) is a passenger railway station located in Yahatanishi-ku, Kitakyūshū. It is operated by the private transportation company Chikuhō Electric Railroad (Chikutetsu), and has station number CK08.

== Lines ==
The station is served by the Chikuhō Electric Railroad Line and is 4.5 kilometers from the terminus of the line at Kurosaki Station.

== Station layout ==
The station consists of two side platforms connected by a level crossing.

== Platforms ==
1	■ Chikuhō Electric Railroad Line	for Chikuhō-Nōgata
2	■ Chikuhō Electric Railroad Line	for Kurosaki

== Adjacent stations ==
←	Service	→
Chikuhō Electric Railroad Line
Imaike	Local	Sangamori

== History ==
The station opened on 25 March 1956.

== Passenger statistics ==
In fiscal 2021, the station was used by 965 passengers daily.

== Surrounding area ==
- Kitakyushu City Eiinumaru Elementary School
- Kitakyushu City Eiinumaru Junior High School
- Fukuoka Prefectural Yahataminami High School

== See also ==
- List of railway stations in Japan
