= Morishita Station (Fukuoka) =

Railway station in Kitakyushu, Fukuoka prefecture, Japan

Morishita Station 森下駅
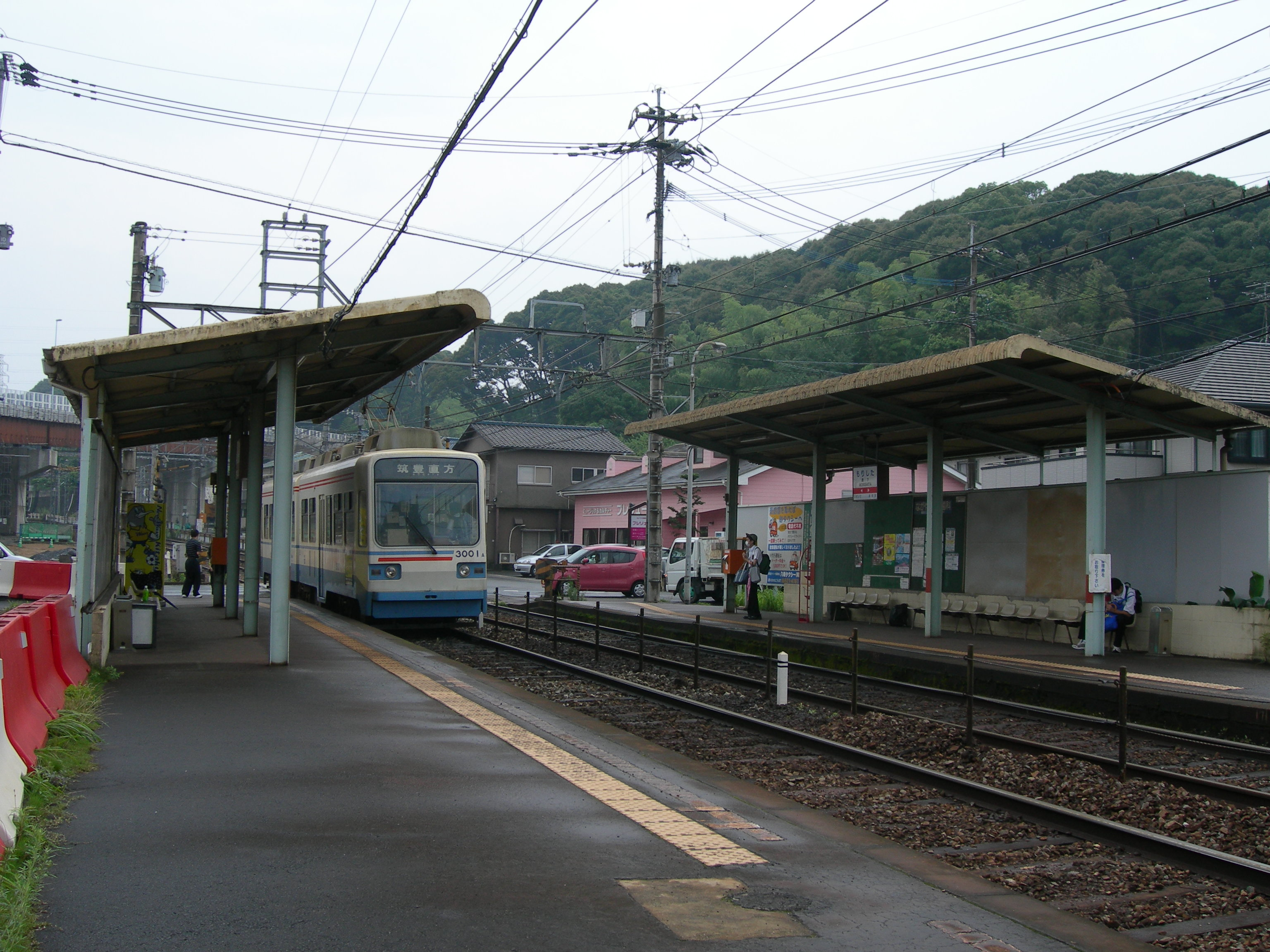
- Morishita Station platform

General information
- Location: 14 Morishitamachi, Yahatanishi Ward, Kitakyushu-shi, Fukuoka-ken 806-0046; Japan
- Coordinates: 33°51′13.6″N 130°44′27.69″E
- Operator: Chikuhō Electric Railroad
- Line: ■ Chikuhō Electric Railroad Line
- Platforms: 2 side platforms

Other information
- Station code: CK 06
- Website: Official website

History
- Opened: 15 October 1956

Passengers
- FY2021: 420
Location
- Location within Fukuoka Prefecture Location within Japan

Morishita Station (森下駅, Morishita-eki) is a passenger railway station located in Yahatanishi-ku, Kitakyūshū. It is operated by the private transportation company Chikuhō Electric Railroad (Chikutetsu), and has station number CK06.

== Lines ==
The station is served by the Chikuhō Electric Railroad Line and is 2.8 kilometers from the terminus of the line at Kurosaki Station.

== Station layout ==
The station consists of two side platforms connected by a level crossing. The station is unattended.

== Platforms ==
1	■ Chikuhō Electric Railroad Line	for Chikuhō-Nōgata
2	■ Chikuhō Electric Railroad Line	for Kurosaki

== Adjacent stations ==
←	Service	→
Chikuhō Electric Railroad Line
Anō	Local	Imaike

== History ==
The station opened on 15 October 1956.

== Passenger statistics ==
In fiscal 2021, the station was used by 420 passengers daily.

== Surrounding area ==
- Seita no Mori Kitakyushu Golf Course
- Kitakyushu City Yawata Special Needs School
- Takami Shrine
- Kitakyushu City Takesue Elementary School

== See also ==
- List of railway stations in Japan
