= Shin-Koyanose Station =

Railway station in Kitakyushu, Fukuoka prefecture, Japan

Shin-Koyanose Station 新木屋瀬駅
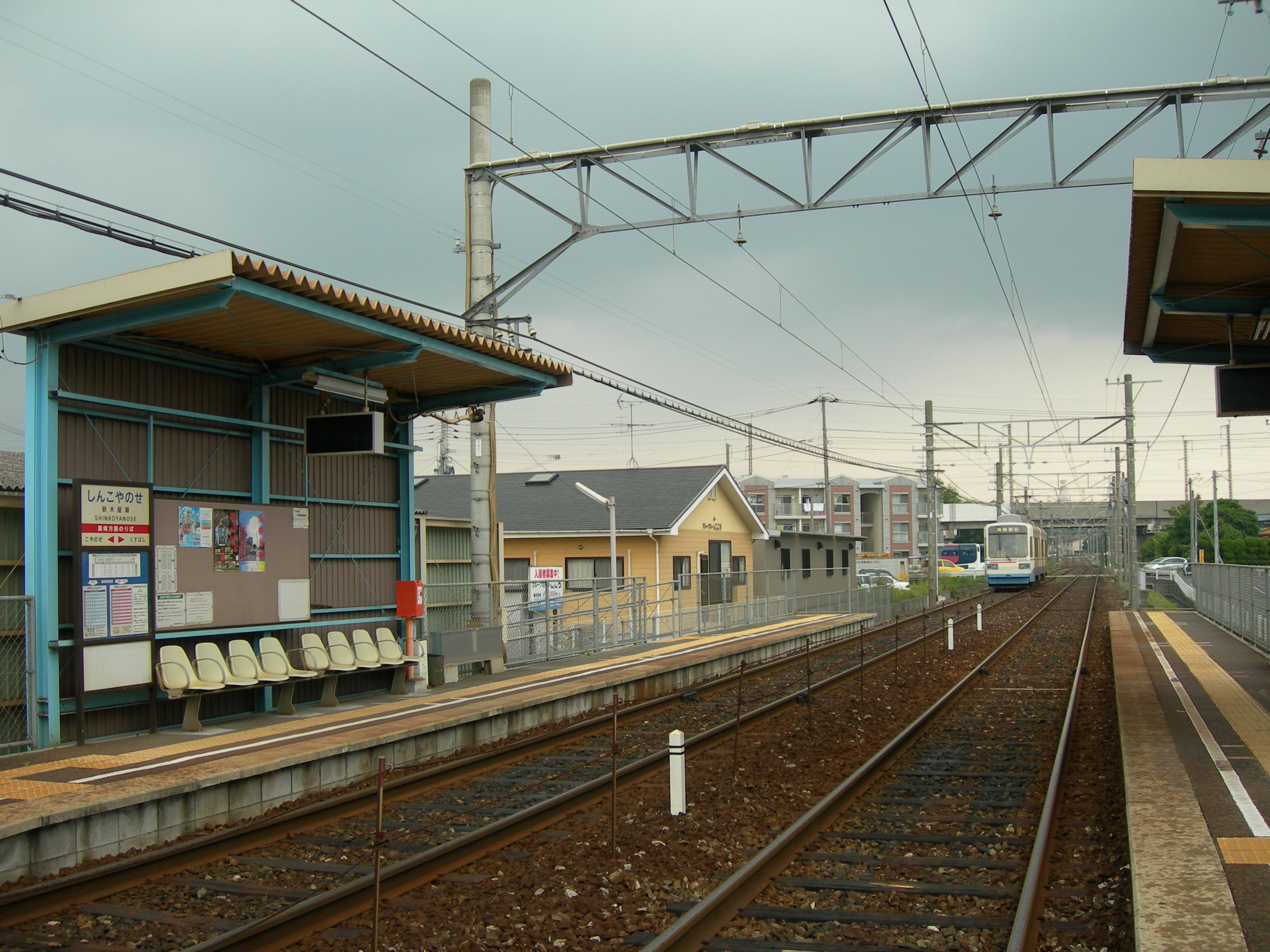
- Shin-Koyanose Station platform

General information
- Location: 1 Chome Koyanose, Yahatanishi-ku, Kitakyūshū-shi, Fukuoka-ken 807-1261; Japan
- Coordinates: 33°47′1.62″N 130°43′28.34″E
- Operator: Chikuhō Electric Railroad
- Line: ■ Chikuhō Electric Railroad Line
- Platforms: 2 side platform

Other information
- Station code: CK 17
- Website: Official website

History
- Opened: 28 April 2004

Passengers
- FY2021: 202
Location
- Location within Fukuoka Prefecture Location within Japan

Shin-Koyanose Station (新木屋瀬駅, Shin-koyanose-eki) is a passenger railway station located in Yahatanishi-ku, Kitakyūshū. It is operated by the private transportation company Chikuhō Electric Railroad (Chikutetsu), and has station number CK17.

== Lines ==
The station is served by the Chikuhō Electric Railroad Line and is 12.1 kilometers from the terminus of the line at Kurosaki Station.

== Station layout ==
The station is elevated station with two side platforms connected by a level crossing. The station is unattended.

== Platforms ==
| 1 | ■ Chikuhō Electric Railroad Line | for Chikuhō-Nōgata |
| 2 | ■ Chikuhō Electric Railroad Line | for Kurosaki |

== Adjacent stations ==
| ← | Service | → |
Chikuhō Electric Railroad Line
| Kusubashi | Local | Koyanose |

== History ==
The station opened on 28 April 2004

== Passenger statistics ==
In fiscal 2021, the station was used by 202 passengers daily.

== Surrounding area ==
- Yahatajikei Hospital

== See also ==
- List of railway stations in Japan
