= Imaike Station =

Imaike Station may refer to:

- Imaike Station (Aichi)
- Imaike Station (Fukuoka)
- Imaike Station (Osaka), a railway station in Japan
