= Higashi-Orio Station =

Train station in Kitakyūshū, Japan

Coordinates: 33°52′04″N 130°44′46″E

Higashi-Orio Station (東折尾駅, Higashi-Orio-eki) was a freight train station on the Kagoshima Main Line of Japanese National Railways (JNR) located in Yahata Nishi-ku, Kitakyūshū, Japan. It served as a station between May 1, 1961, and February 1, 1984.

After its discontinuation as a station, the remaining yard continued as Higashi-Orio Shingōjō (東折尾信号場) which still exists as of 2008.

Its location was between Kurosaki Station and Orio Station, 1.9 km from the former and 3.3 km from the latter. In 2000, Jinnoharu Station opened partially utilizing the land of the former yard.

== History ==
- February 1, 1952 – JNR opens Orio Yard (sōshajō).
- May 1, 1961 – Higashi-Orio Station (freight only) opens replacing Orio Yard.
- October 1, 1974 – Higashi-Orio Station starts handling of baggage.
- May 1, 1979 – Higashi-Orio Station ceases handling of baggage.
- February 1, 1984 – Higashi-Orio Station closes and Higashi-Orio Yard (shingōjō) substitutes the station.
- April 1, 1987 – JR Kyūshū succeeds control of JNR in Kyūshū including Higashi-Orio Yard.
