= Ongano Station =

Railway station in Nōgata, Fukuoka prefecture, Japan

Ongano Station 遠賀野駅
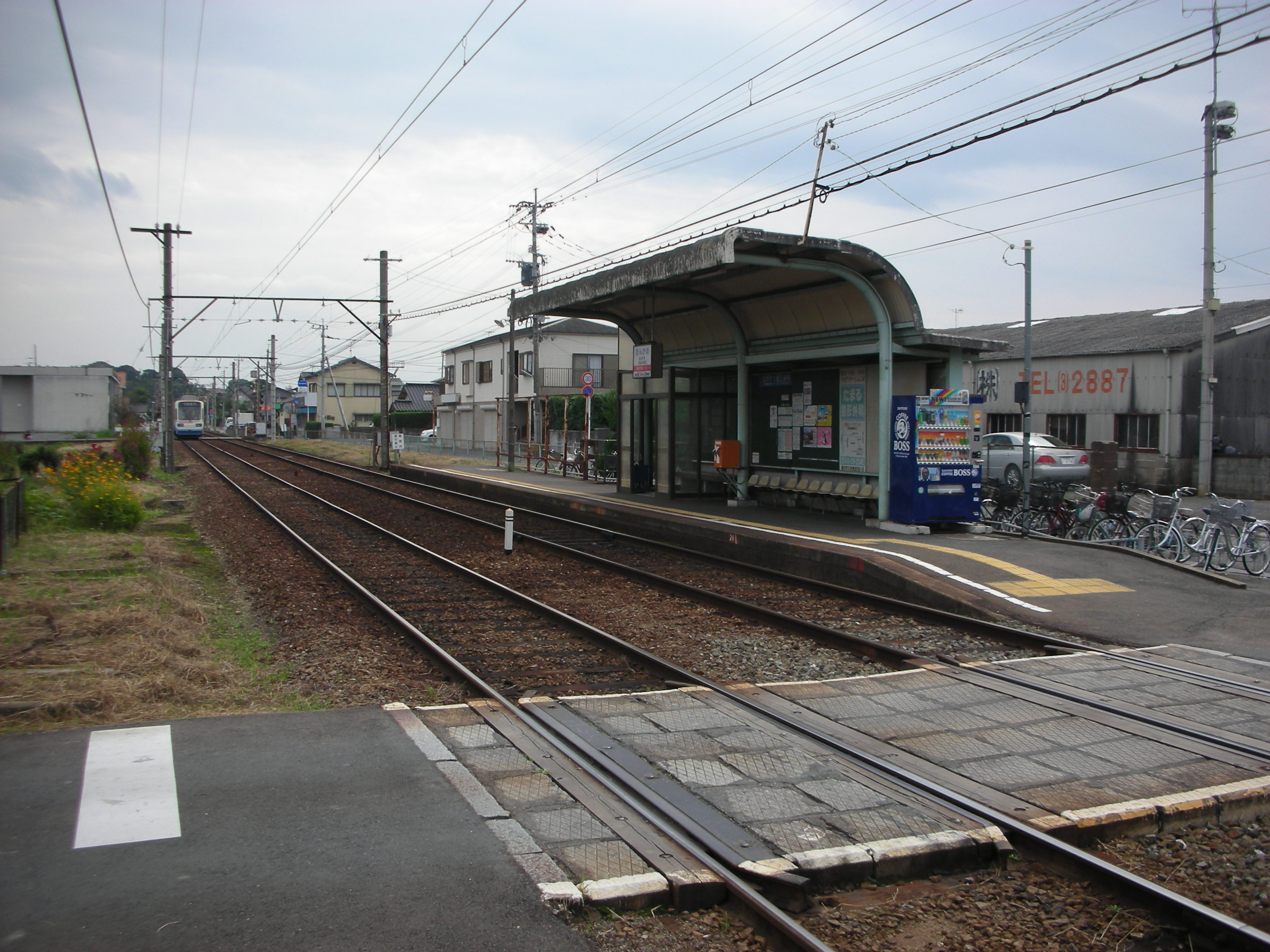
- Ongano Station platform

General information
- Location: 2211-2 Wakayanagi, Ganda, Nōgata-shi, Fukuoka-ken 822-0001; Japan
- Coordinates: 33°46′9.13″N 130°43′50.25″E
- Operator: Chikuhō Electric Railroad
- Line: ■ Chikuhō Electric Railroad Line
- Platforms: 2 side platforms

Other information
- Station code: CK 19
- Website: Official website

History
- Opened: 18 September 1959

Passengers
- FY2021: 263
Location
- Location within Fukuoka Prefecture Location within Japan

Ongano Station (遠賀野駅, Ongano-eki) is a passenger railway station located in the city of Nōgata, Fukuoka. It is operated by the private transportation company Chikuhō Electric Railroad (Chikutetsu), and has station number CK19.

== Lines ==
The station is served by the Chikuhō Electric Railroad Line and is 13.9 kilometers from the opposite terminus of the line at Kurosaki Station.

== Station layout ==
The station is elevated station with two side platforms connected by a level crossing. The station is unattended.

== Platforms ==
1	■ Chikuhō Electric Railroad Line	for Chikuhō-Nōgata
2	■ Chikuhō Electric Railroad Line	for Kurosaki

== Adjacent stations ==
←	Service	→
Chikuhō Electric Railroad Line
Koyanose	Local	Ganda

== History ==
The station opened on 18 September 1959.

== Passenger statistics ==
In fiscal 2021, the station was used by 263 passengers daily.

== Surrounding area ==
- Japan National Route 200
- Nōgatakanda Post Office
- Ongano Nursery

== See also ==
- List of railway stations in Japan
