= Koyanose Station =

Railway station in Kitakyushu, Fukuoka prefecture, Japan

Koyanose Station 木屋瀬駅
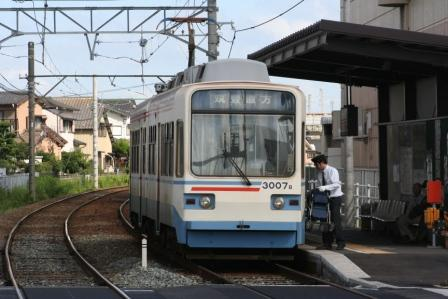
- Koyanose Station platform

General information
- Location: 5 Chome Koyanose, Yahatanishi-ku, Kitakyūshū-shi, Fukuoka-ken 807-1261; Japan
- Coordinates: 33°46′43.88″N 130°43′29.17″E
- Operator: Chikuhō Electric Railroad
- Line: ■ Chikuhō Electric Railroad Line
- Platforms: 2 side platforms

Other information
- Station code: CK 18
- Website: Official website

History
- Opened: 29 April 1958

Passengers
- FY2021: 551
Location
- Location within Fukuoka Prefecture Location within Japan

Koyanose Station (木屋瀬駅, Koyanose-eki) is a passenger railway station located in Yahatanishi-ku, Kitakyūshū. It is operated by the private transportation company Chikuhō Electric Railroad (Chikutetsu), and has station number CK18.

== Lines ==
The station is served by the Chikuhō Electric Railroad Line and is 12.6 kilometers from the terminus of the line at Kurosaki Station.

== Station layout ==
The station is elevated station with two side platforms connected by a level crossing. The station is unattended.

== Platforms ==
1	■ Chikuhō Electric Railroad Line	for Chikuhō-Nōgata
2	■ Chikuhō Electric Railroad Line	for Kurosaki

== Adjacent stations ==
←	Service	→
Chikuhō Electric Railroad Line
Shin-Koyanose	Local	Ongano

== History ==
The station opened on 29 April 1958 as the original terminus of the Chikuhō Electric Railroad Line. The line was extended to Chikuhō-Nōgata on 18 September 1959.

== Passenger statistics ==
In fiscal 2021, the station was used by 551 passengers daily.

== Surrounding area ==
- Japan National Route 200
- Fukuoka Prefectural Route 73
- Fukuoka Prefectural Route 280
- Koyanose Elementary School

== See also ==
- List of railway stations in Japan
