= Imaike Station (Fukuoka) =

Railway station in Kitakyushu, Fukuoka prefecture, Japan

Imaike Station 今池駅
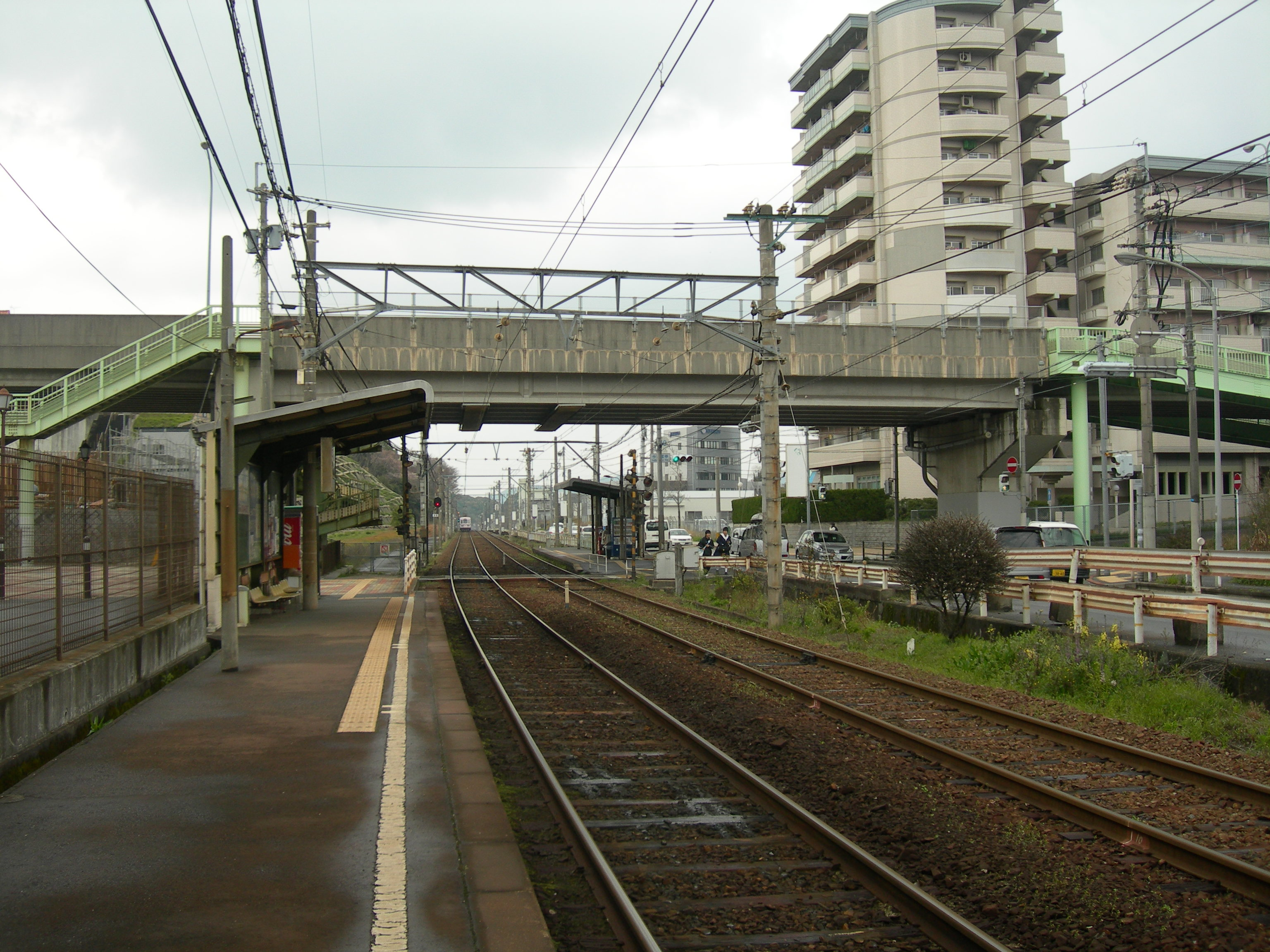
- Imaike Station platform

General information
- Location: 2-chōme-17 Satonaka, Yahatanishi Ward, Kitakyushu-shi, Fukuoka-ken 807-0846; Japan
- Coordinates: 33°50′45.35″N 130°44′23.06″E
- Operator: Chikuhō Electric Railroad
- Line: ■ Chikuhō Electric Railroad Line
- Platforms: 2 side platforms

Other information
- Station code: CK 07
- Website: Official website

History
- Opened: 20 December 1970

Passengers
- FY2021: 1401
Location
- Location within Fukuoka Prefecture Location within Japan

Imaike Station (今池駅, Imaike-eki) is a passenger railway station located in Yahatanishi-ku, Kitakyūshū. It is operated by the private transportation company Chikuhō Electric Railroad (Chikutetsu), and has station number CK07.

== Lines ==
The station is served by the Chikuhō Electric Railroad Line and is 3,7 kilometers from the terminus of the line at Kurosaki Station.

== Station layout ==
The station consists of two side platforms connected by a level crossing. The station is unattended.

== Platforms ==
1	■ Chikuhō Electric Railroad Line	for Chikuhō-Nōgata
2	■ Chikuhō Electric Railroad Line	for Kurosaki

== Adjacent stations ==
←	Service	→
Chikuhō Electric Railroad Line
Morishita	Local	Einomaru

== History ==
The station opened on 20 December 1970.

== Passenger statistics ==
In fiscal 2021, the station was used by 1401 passengers daily.

== Surrounding area ==
The area surrounding the station is a quiet residential area.

- Kitakyushu City Takesue Elementary School
- Fukuoka Prefectural Kitazuki High School

== See also ==
- List of railway stations in Japan
