= Kyūshūkōdai-mae Station =

Railway station in Kitakyushu, Japan

JA 26 Kyūshūkōdai-mae Station 九州工大前駅
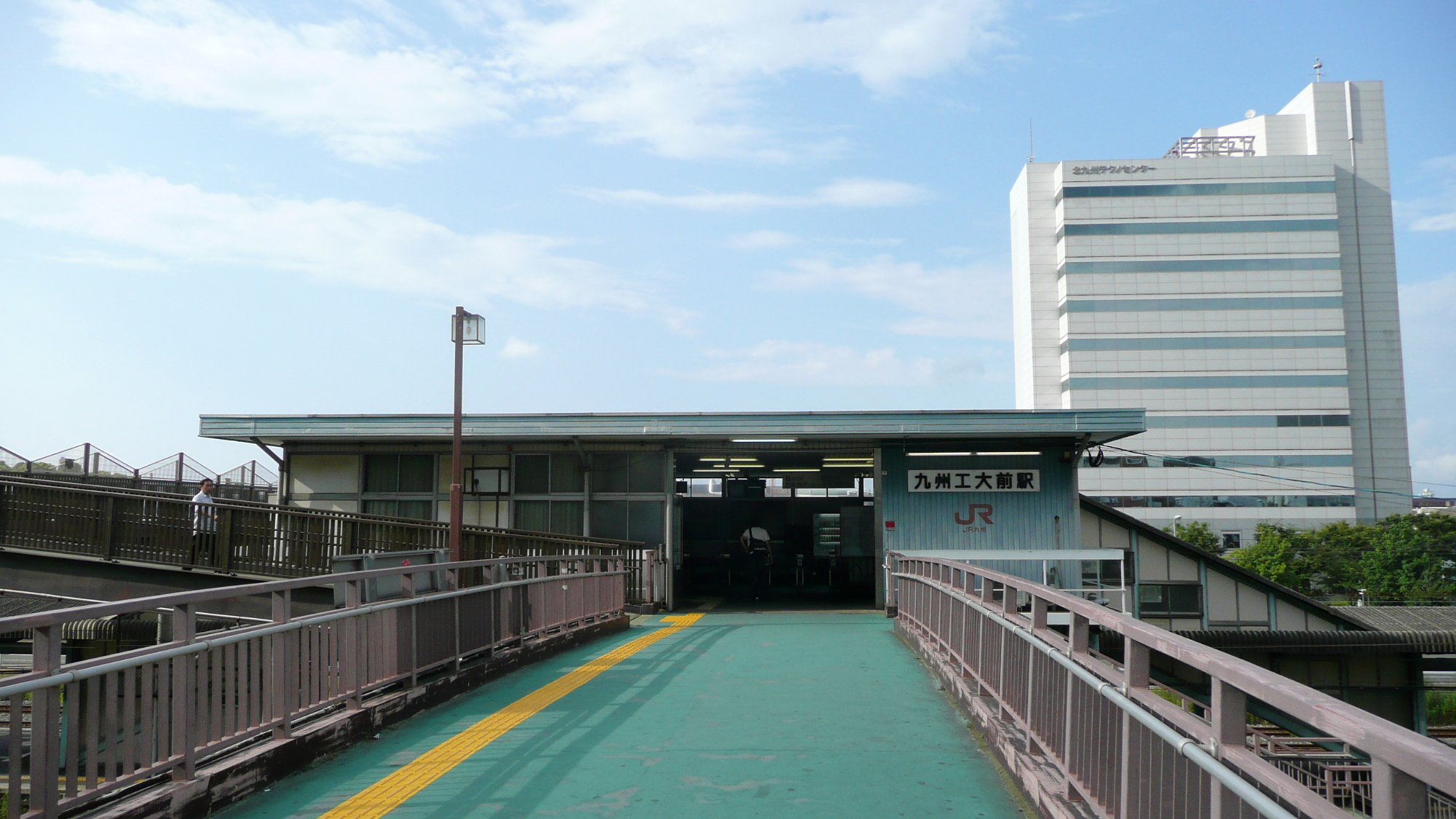
- Kyūshūkōdai-mae Station

General information
- Location: 1-chōme-12 Nakabarunishi, Tobata-ku, Kitakyushu-shi, Fukuoka-ken 804-0011; Japan
- Coordinates: 33°54′02″N 130°50′25″E
- Operator: JR Kyushu
- Line: JA Kagoshima Main Line
- Distance: 15.3 km from Mojikō
- Platforms: 1 island platform

Construction
- Structure type: At grade

Other information
- Status: Staffed
- Website: Official website

History
- Opened: 1 July 1970
- Former names: Shin-Nakabaru (until 1 November 1990)

Passengers
- FY2020: 3359
- Rank: 49th (among JR Kyushu stations)

Services
Preceding station	JR Kyushu	Following station
Tobata towards Kagoshima	Kagoshima Main Line	Nishi-Kokura towards Mojikō
Location
- Location within Fukuoka Prefecture Location within Japan

Kyūshūkōdai-mae Station (九州工大前駅, Kyūshūkōdaimae-eki) is a passenger railway station located in Tobata-ku, Kitakyushu, Japan. It is operated by JR Kyushu. Its name means, literally, "In front of Kyushu Institute of Technology."

== Lines ==
The station is served by the Kagoshima Main Line and is located 15.3 km from the starting point of the line at Mojikō.

== Layout ==
The station consists of one island platform, with an elevated station building. The station is staffed.

=== Platforms ===
1	■ JA Kagoshima Main Line	for Orio and Hakata
2	■ JA Kagoshima Main Line	for Kokura and Shimonoseki

== History ==
The station was opened with the name Shin-Nakabaru Station (新中原駅, Shin-Nakabaru-eki) by Japanese National Railways (JNR) on 1 November 1970 as an added station on the existing track of the Kagoshima Main Line. On 1 April 1987, with the privatization of JNR, JR Kyushu took over control of the station. On 1 November 1990, the station name was changed to Kyūshūkōdai-mae.

== Passenger statistics ==
In fiscal 2020, the station was used by an average of 3359 passengers daily (boarding passengers only), and it ranked 49th among the busiest stations of JR Kyushu.

== Surrounding area ==
- Kyushu Institute of Technology
- Nippon Steel Yawata Works
- Japan National Route 199

== See also ==
- List of railway stations in Japan
