= Space World Station =

Railway station in Kitakyushu, Japan

JA 23 Space World Station スペースワールド駅
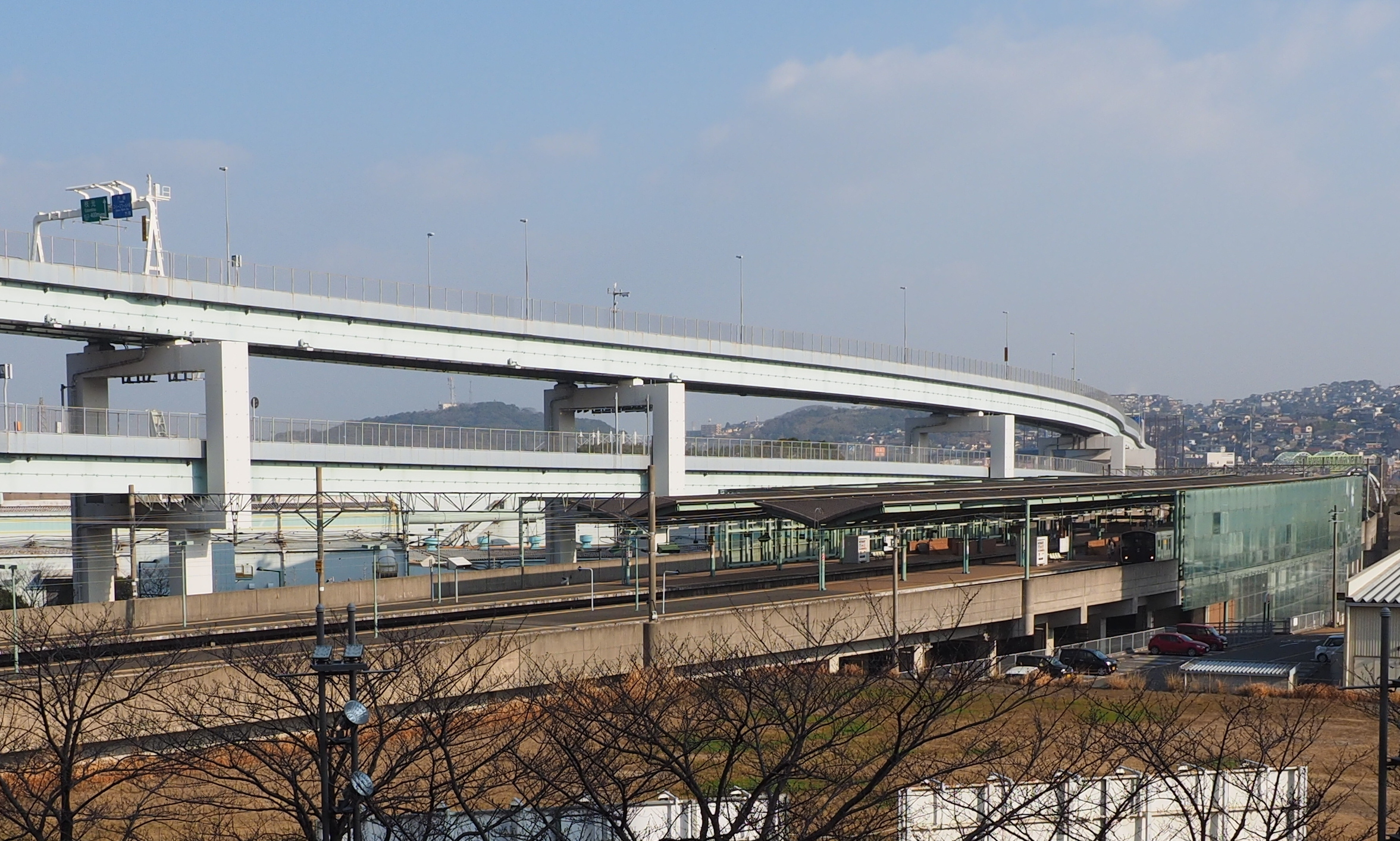
- Space World Station in January 2019

General information
- Location: Higashida, Higashi-ku, Kitakyushu, Fukuoka-ken 805-0071; Japan
- Coordinates: 33°52′16″N 130°48′22″E
- Operator: JR Kyushu
- Line: JA Kagoshima Main Line
- Platforms: 2 island platforms
- Tracks: 4

Other information
- Status: Staffed
- Website: Official website

History
- Opened: 2 July 1999

Passengers
- FY2020: 1696 daily
- Rank: 85th (among JR Kyushu stations)

Services
Preceding station	JR Kyushu	Following station
Yahata towards Kagoshima	Kagoshima Main Line	Edamitsu towards Mojikō
Location
- Location within Fukuoka Prefecture Location within Japan

Space World Station (スペースワールド駅, Supēsuwārudo-eki) is a passenger railway station located in Yahatahigashi-ku, Kitakyushu, Fukuoka Prefecture, Japan operated by JR Kyushu.

== Lines ==
The station is served by the Kagoshima Main Line and is located 21.1 km from the starting point of the line at Mojikō.

== Layout ==
The station consists of two elevated island platforms serving four tracks, with the station building underneath. A glass screen is installed as a windbreak. The floor and walls of the station building are made of brick, and the side walls are made of steel, in the image of the nearby Higashida Daiichi Blast Furnace. The station is staffed. A freight line (double track) runs inside Track 4 (on the sea side).

=== Platforms ===
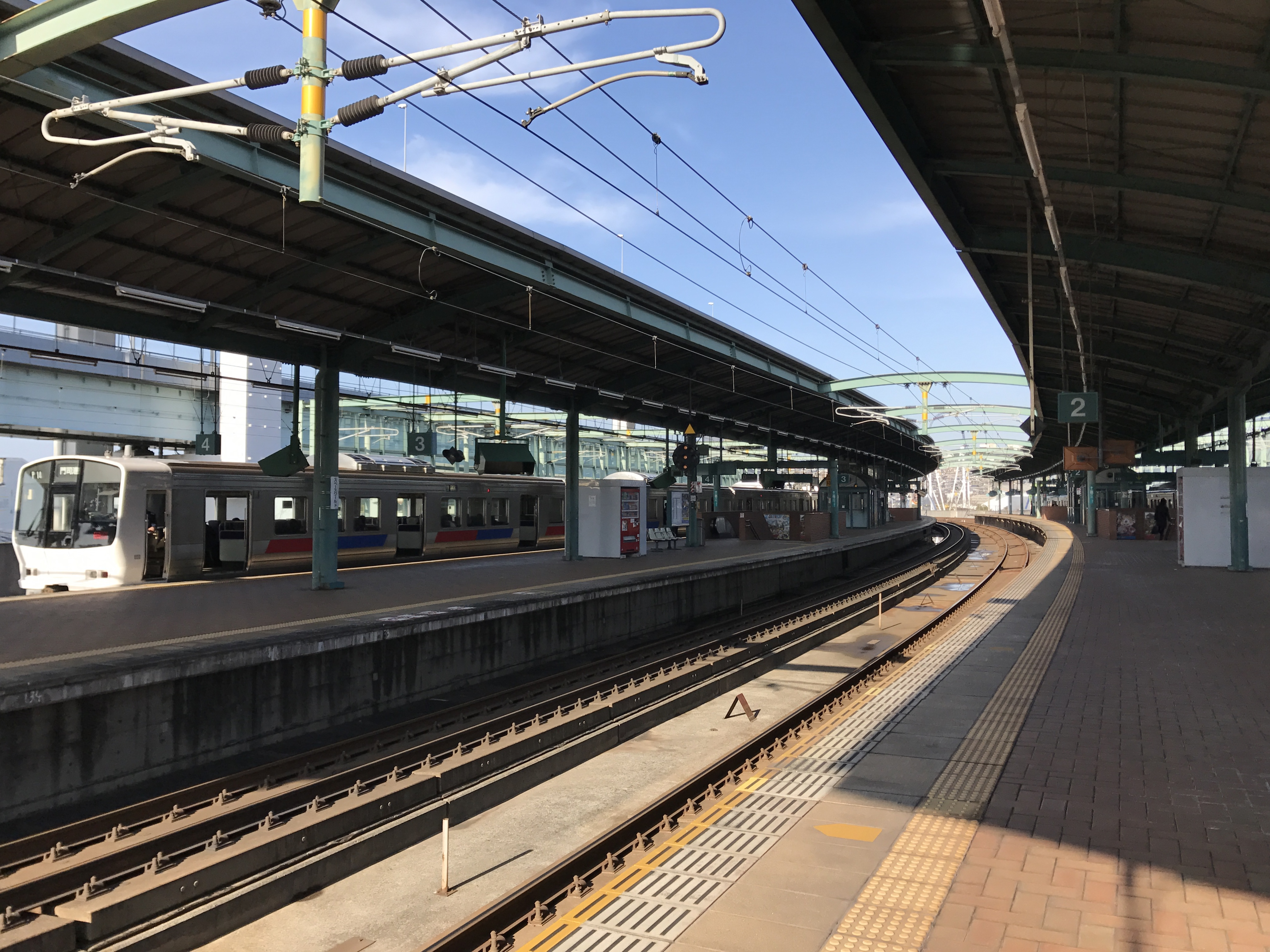
The platforms in March 2017

1, 2	■ JA Kagoshima Main Line	for Orio and Hakata
3, 4	■ JA Kagoshima Main Line	for Kokura and Shimonoseki

== History ==
The station opened on 2 July 1999. The name was selected following a public poll, with other suggested names including "1901 Station" (to commemorate the 1901 opening of the nearby Yahata steelworks) and "Higashida Station" (東田駅) (the name of the area served by the station). The nearby Space World theme park closed in December 2017, but JR Kyushu has no plans to rename the station following the closure.

== Passenger statistics ==
In fiscal 2020, the station was used by an average of 1696 passengers daily (boarding passengers only), and it ranked 85th among the busiest stations of JR Kyushu.

== Surrounding area ==
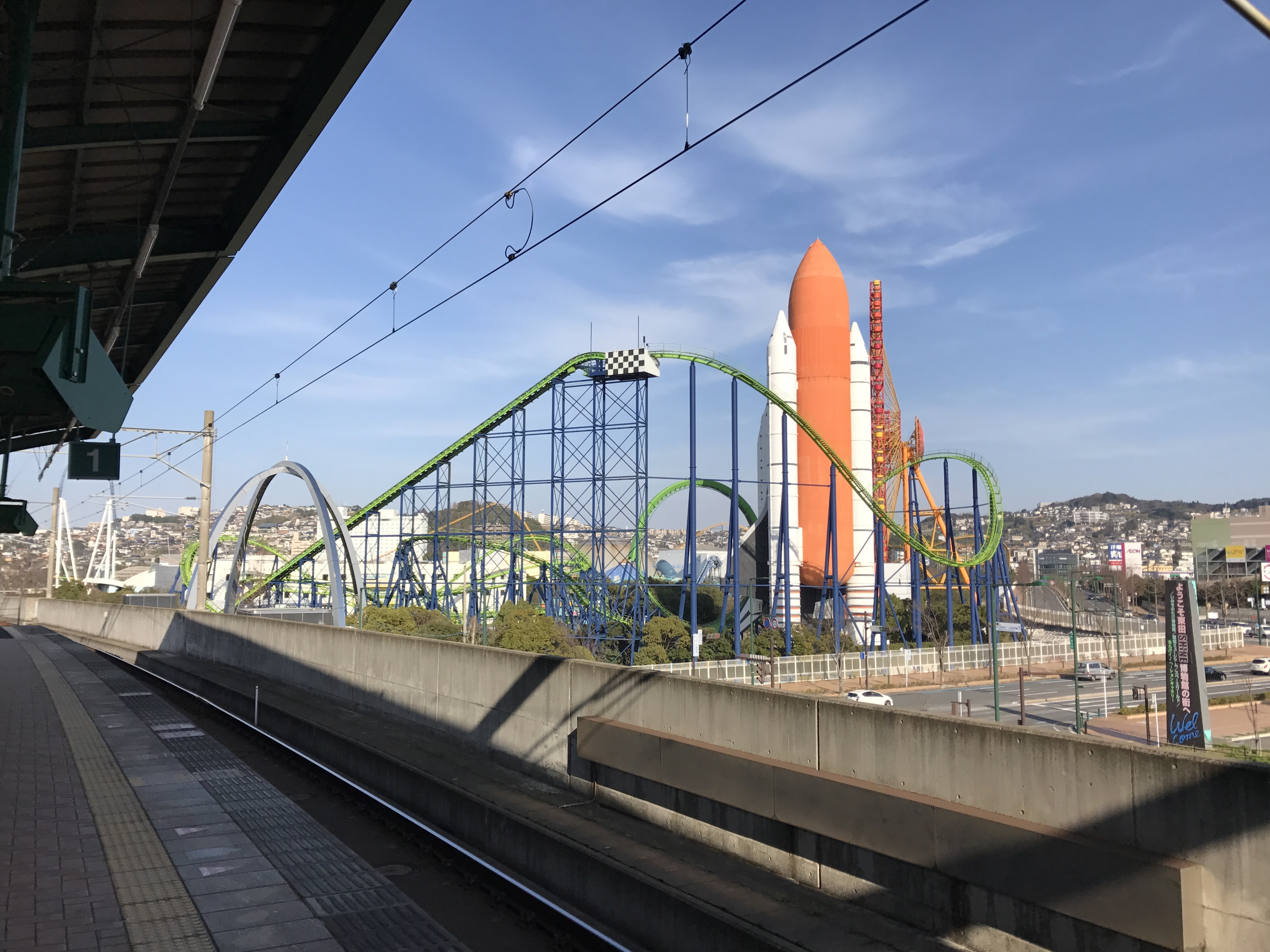
The Space World theme park as seen from the station platform in March 2017

- National Route 3
- Space World
- Kitakyushu Museum of Natural History & Human History
- Kitakyushu Environment Museum
- Kitakyushu Innovation Gallery and Studio
- Aeon Mall Yahata Higashi shopping mall
- Steel Memorial Yawata Hospital
- Kitakyushu Chuo Junior High School

== See also ==
- List of railway stations in Japan
