= Edamitsu Station =

Railway station in Kitakyushu, Japan

JA 24 Edamitsu Station 枝光駅
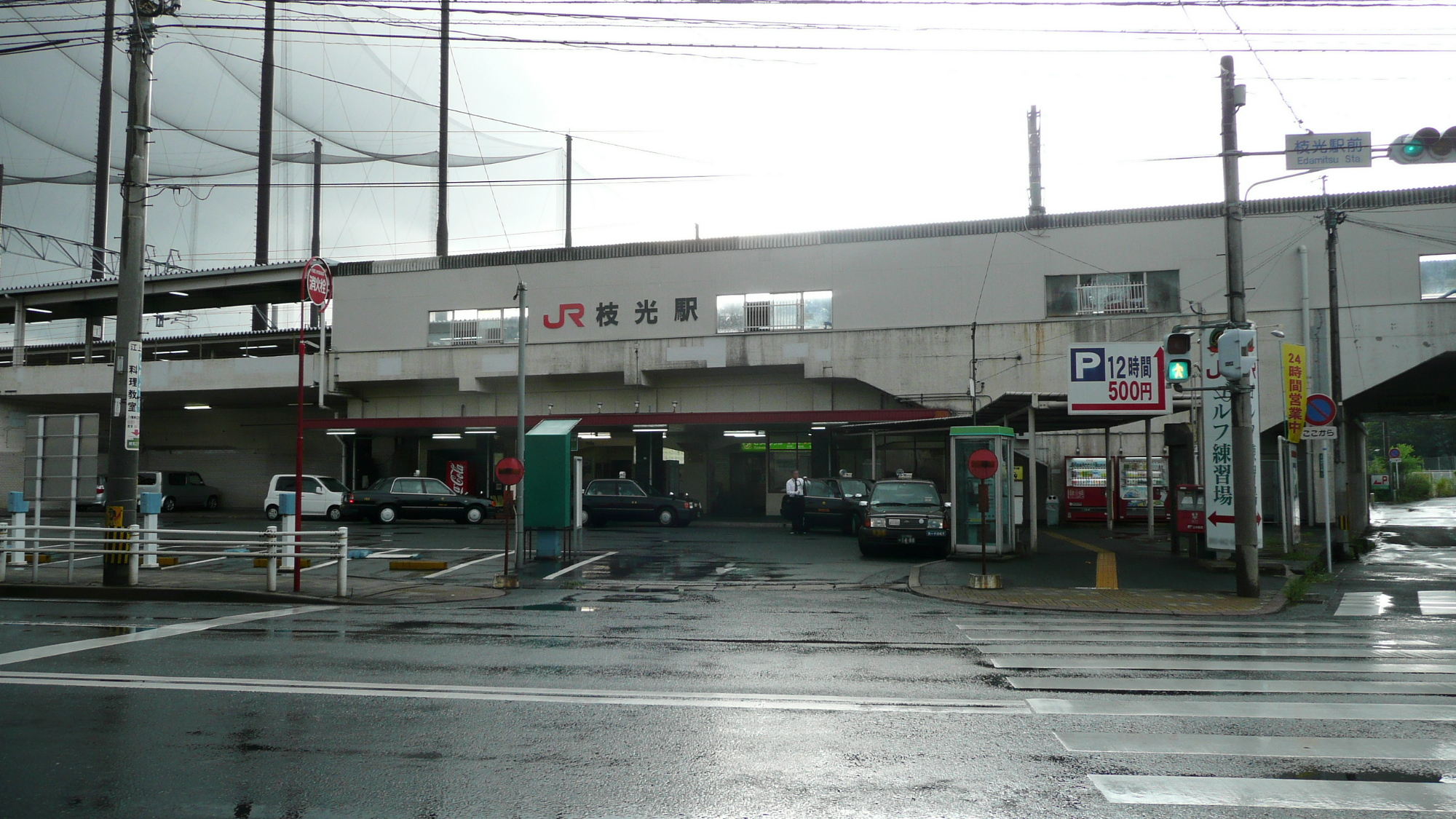

General information
- Location: 2-chōme-1 Edamitsu, Yahatahigashi-ku, Kitakyushu-shi, Fukuoka-ken 805-0002; Japan
- Coordinates: 33°52′45″N 130°48′46″E
- Operator: JR Kyushu
- Line: JA Kagoshima Main Line
- Distance: 20.0 km from Mojikō
- Platforms: 2 side platforms
- Tracks: 2

Construction
- Structure type: Elevated

Other information
- Status: Staffed
- Website: Official website

History
- Opened: 1 April 1908

Passengers
- FY20220: 2662
- Rank: 55th (among JR Kyushu stations)

Services
Preceding station	JR Kyushu	Following station
Space World towards Kagoshima	Kagoshima Main Line	Tobata towards Mojikō
Location
- Location within Fukuoka Prefecture Location within Japan

Edamitsu Station (枝光駅, Edamitsu-eki) is a passenger railway station located in Yahatahigashi-ku, Kitakyushu, Japan. It is operated by JR Kyushu.

== Lines ==
The station is served by the Kagoshima Main Line and is located 20.0 km from the starting point of the line at Mojikō.

== Layout ==
The station consists of two opposed elevated side platforms serving two tracks, with the station building underneath. The station is staffed.

=== Platforms ===
1	■ JA Kagoshima Main Line	for Orio and Hakata
2	■ JA Kagoshima Main Line	for Kokura and Shimonoseki

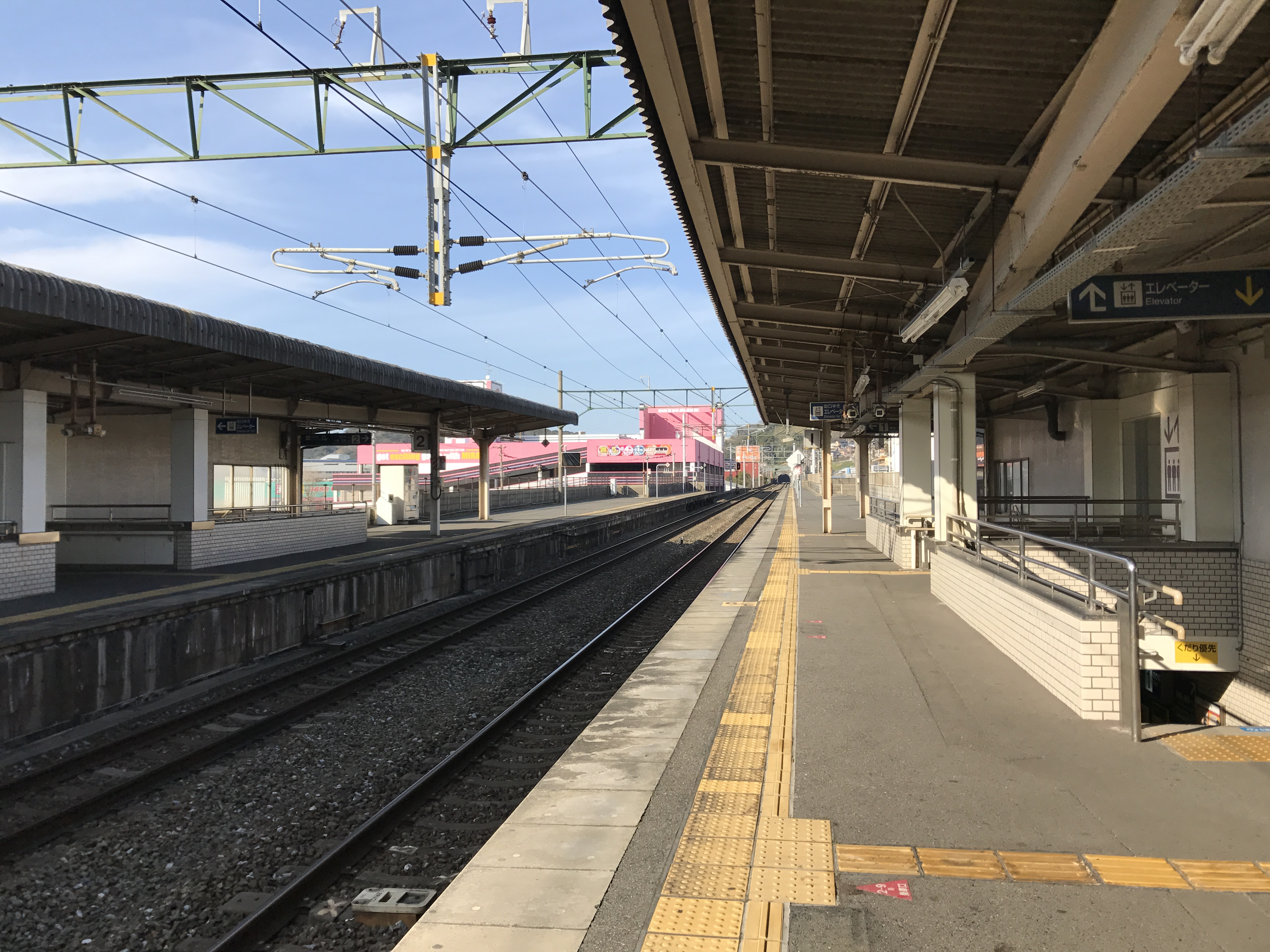
Platform（March 2017）

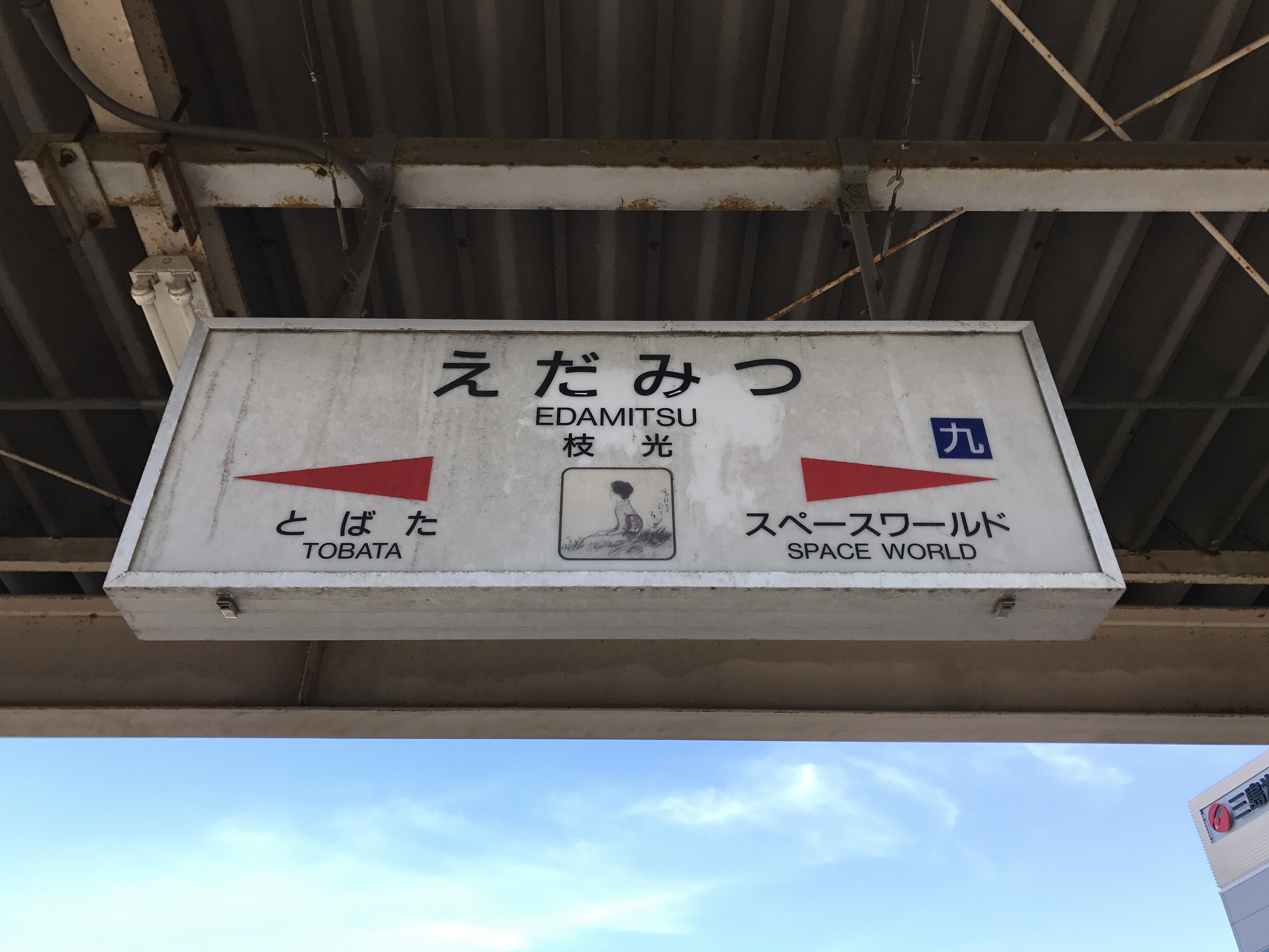
Station sign

== History ==
The station was opened by Japanese Government Railways (JGR) on 1 April 1908 on its stretch of track between Moji (now Mojikō and Yatsushiro. On 12 October 1909, the station became part of the Hitoyoshi Main Line and then on 21 November 1909, part of the Kagoshima Main Line. With the privatization of Japanese National Railways (JNR), the successor of JGR, on 1 April 1987, JR Kyushu took over control of the station.

== Passenger statistics ==
In fiscal 2020, the station was used by an average of 2662 passengers daily (boarding passengers only), and it ranked 55th among the busiest stations of JR Kyushu.

== Surrounding area ==
It is located in an old urban area, with many private houses and shops. The freight line of the Kagoshima Main Line runs approximately 150 meters west of the station, and the Nippon Steel Yawata Works Tailings Railway (Kurogane Line) runs approximately 200 meters southeast of the station.

- Kitakyushu City Edamitsu Elementary School
- Kitakyushu City Edamitsudai Junior High School
- Kyushu International University Junior and Senior High School

== See also ==
- List of railway stations in Japan
