= Yahata Station =

Railway station in Kitakyushu, Japan

JA 22 Yahata Station 八幡駅
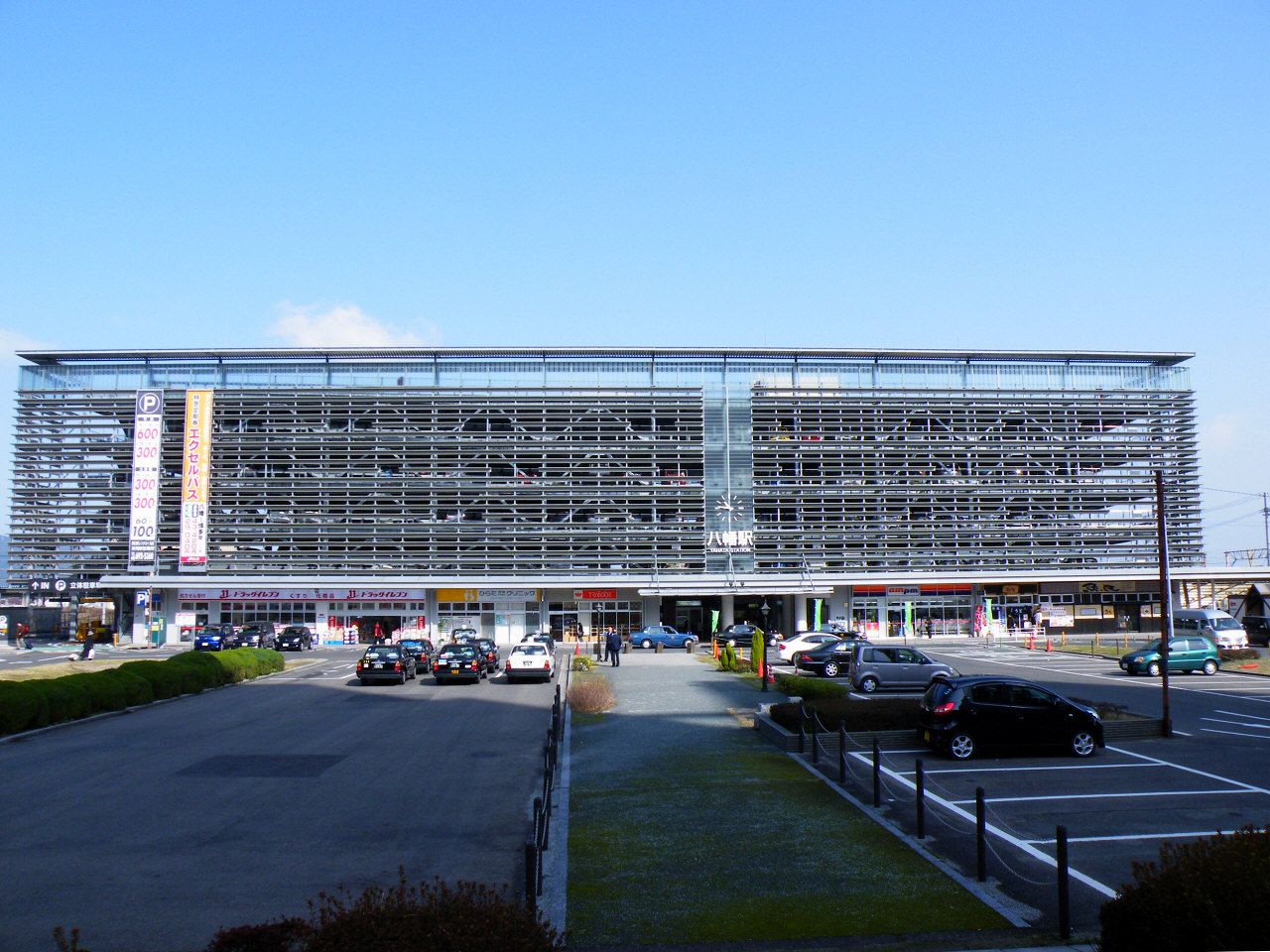
- Yahata Station

General information
- Location: 3-chōme-6 Nishihonmachi, Yahatahigashi-ku, Kitakyushu-shi, Fukuoka-ken 805-0061; Japan
- Coordinates: 33°52′09″N 130°47′43″E
- Operator: JR Kyushu
- Line: JA Kagoshima Main Line
- Distance: 22.2 km from Mojikō
- Platforms: 2 island platforms
- Tracks: 4

Other information
- Status: Staffed (Midori no Madoguchi)
- Website: Official website

History
- Opened: 27 December 1902

Passengers
- FY2020: 5094
- Rank: 27th (among JR Kyushu stations)

Services
Preceding station	JR Kyushu	Following station
Kurosaki towards Kagoshima	Kagoshima Main Line	Space World towards Mojikō
Location
- Location within Fukuoka Prefecture Location within Japan

Yahata Station (八幡駅, Yahata-eki) is a passenger railway station located in Yahatahigashi-ku, Kitakyushu, Japan. It is operated by JR Kyushu.

== Lines ==
The station is served by the Kagoshima Main Line and is located 22.2 km from the starting point of the line at Mojikō.

== Layout ==
The station consists of two elevated island platforms serving four tracks. The tracks/platforms and the station building are at the same height, and a passage connecting them and a free passage to the north exit pass under the embankment. There are elevators connecting the platform and the underground passage, and the underground passage and the station building. The station has a Midori no Madoguchi staffed ticket office. The structure consists of five floors above ground, with the second to fifth floors being a multi-storey parking lot. It officially opened on March 1, 2008.

=== Platforms ===
1, 2	■ JA Kagoshima Main Line	for Orio and Hakata
3, 4	■ JA Kagoshima Main Line	for Kokura and Shimonoseki

== History ==
The privately run Kyushu Railway had begun laying down its network on Kyushu in 1889 and by November 1896 had a stretch of track from Yatsushiro northwards to Kurosaki. This stretch of track was subsequently linked up with another stretch further north from Moji (now Mojikō) to Kokura which had been laid down in 1891. The linkup was achieved on 27 December 1902, with Yahata opened on the same day as one of the intermediate stations on the new track between Kokura and Kurosaki. When the Kyushu Railway was nationalized on 1 July 1907, Japanese Government Railways (JGR) took over control of the station. On 12 October 1909, the station became part of the Hitoyoshi Main Line and then on 21 November 1909, part of the Kagoshima Main Line. With the privatization of Japanese National Railways (JNR), the successor of JGR, on 1 April 1987, JR Kyushu took over control of the station.

== Passenger statistics ==
In fiscal 2020, the station was used by an average of 5094 passengers daily (boarding passengers only), and it ranked 27th among the busiest stations of JR Kyushu.

== Surrounding area ==
- Sawarabi Garden Mall Yawata
- Kitakyushu Yahatahigashi Hospital
- Kitakyushu City Yawata Hospital
- Kitakyushu City Yawata Civic Hall
- Kitakyushu City Ogura Junior High School
- Nippon Steel Yawata Works

== See also ==
- List of railway stations in Japan
