= Jinnoharu Station =

Railway station in Kitakyushu, Japan

JA 20 Jinnoharu Station 陣原駅
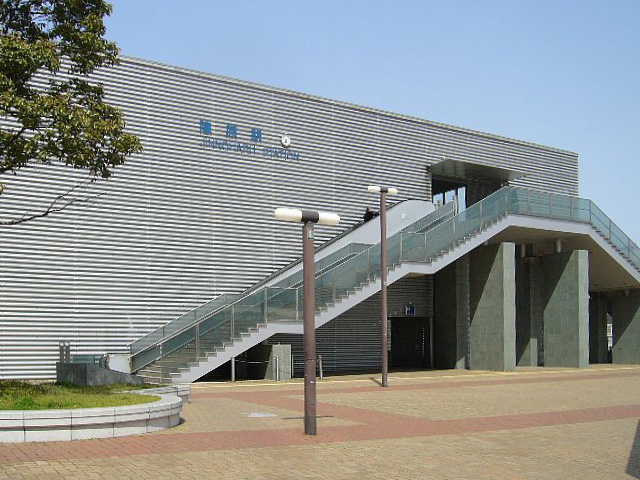
- Jinnoharu Station in March 2006

General information
- Location: Jinnoharu, Yahatanishi-ku, Kitakyushu-shi, Fukuoka-ken; Japan
- Coordinates: 33°52′06″N 130°44′33″E
- Operator: JR Kyushu
- Lines: JA Kagoshima Main Line; JC Fukuhoku Yutaka Line
- Distance: 27.1 km from Mojikō
- Platforms: 1 side platform + 2 island platforms
- Tracks: 5

Construction
- Structure type: At grade

Other information
- Status: Staffed
- Website: Official website

History
- Opened: 21 November 2000

Passengers
- FY2020: 1785 daily
- Rank: 82nd (among JR Kyushu stations)

Services
Preceding station	JR Kyushu	Following station
Orio towards Kagoshima	Kagoshima Main Line	Kurosaki towards Mojikō
Orio towards Kurosaki	Fukuhoku Yutaka Line	Higashi-Orio towards Hakata
Location
- Location within Fukuoka Prefecture Location within Japan

Jinnoharu Station (陣原駅, Jinnoharu-eki) is a passenger railway station located in Yahatanishi-ku, Kitakyushu, Fukuoka Prefecture, Japan. It is operated by JR Kyushu.

== Lines ==
The station is served by the Kagoshima Main Line and is located 27.1 km from the start of the line at Mojikō. It is also used by trains of the Fukuhoku Yutaka Line, which use the same tracks.

== Layout ==
The station has one side platform and two island platforms, serving a total of five tracks. The platforms are connected by an elevated station building. The station is staffed.

=== Platforms ===
1	■ JC Fukuhoku Yutaka Line	for Orio and Nōgata
2	■ JC Fukuhoku Yutaka Line	for Kurosaki and Kokura
3	■ JR Kyushu	not in operation
4	■ JA Kagoshima Main Line	for Orio and Hakata
5	■ JA Kagoshima Main Line	for Shimonoseki and Kokura

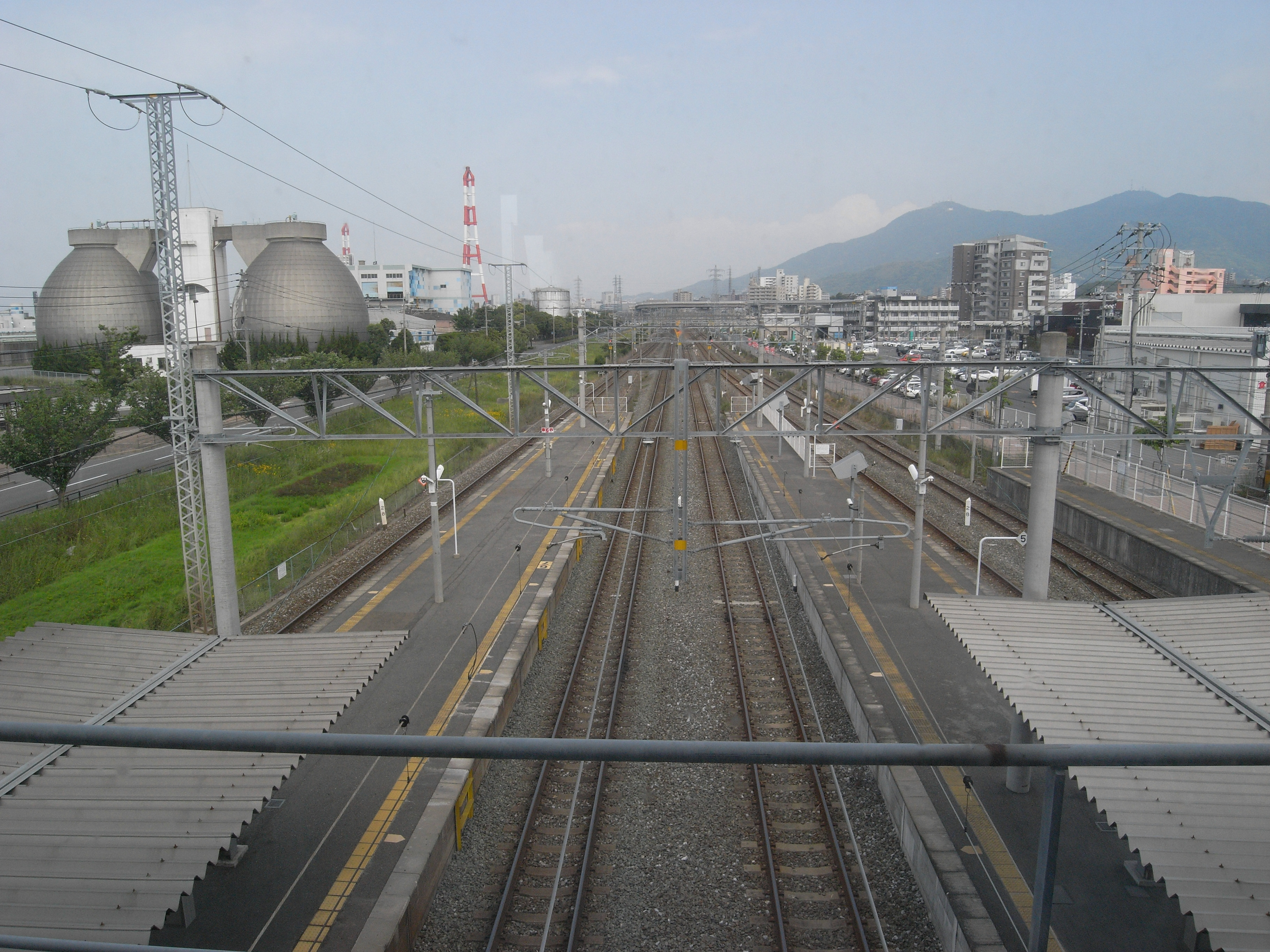
The platforms in May 2009, looking west

== History ==
The station was opened by JR Kyushu on 21 November 2000 as an additional station on the existing Kagoshima Main Line track.

== Passenger statistics ==
In fiscal 2020, the station was used by an average of 1785 passengers daily (boarding passengers only), and it ranked 82nd among the busiest stations of JR Kyushu.

== Surrounding area ==
- Japan National Route 3
- Fukuoka Vocational Ability Development Promotion Center (Polytech Center Fukuoka)
- Emozaki Sewage Treatment Plant/Environmental Center
- Yubara Industrial Park

== See also ==
- List of railway stations in Japan
