= Kurosaki Station =

Railway station in Kitakyushu, Japan

Coordinates: 33.8668433°N 130.7661438°E

JA 21 Kurosaki 黒崎
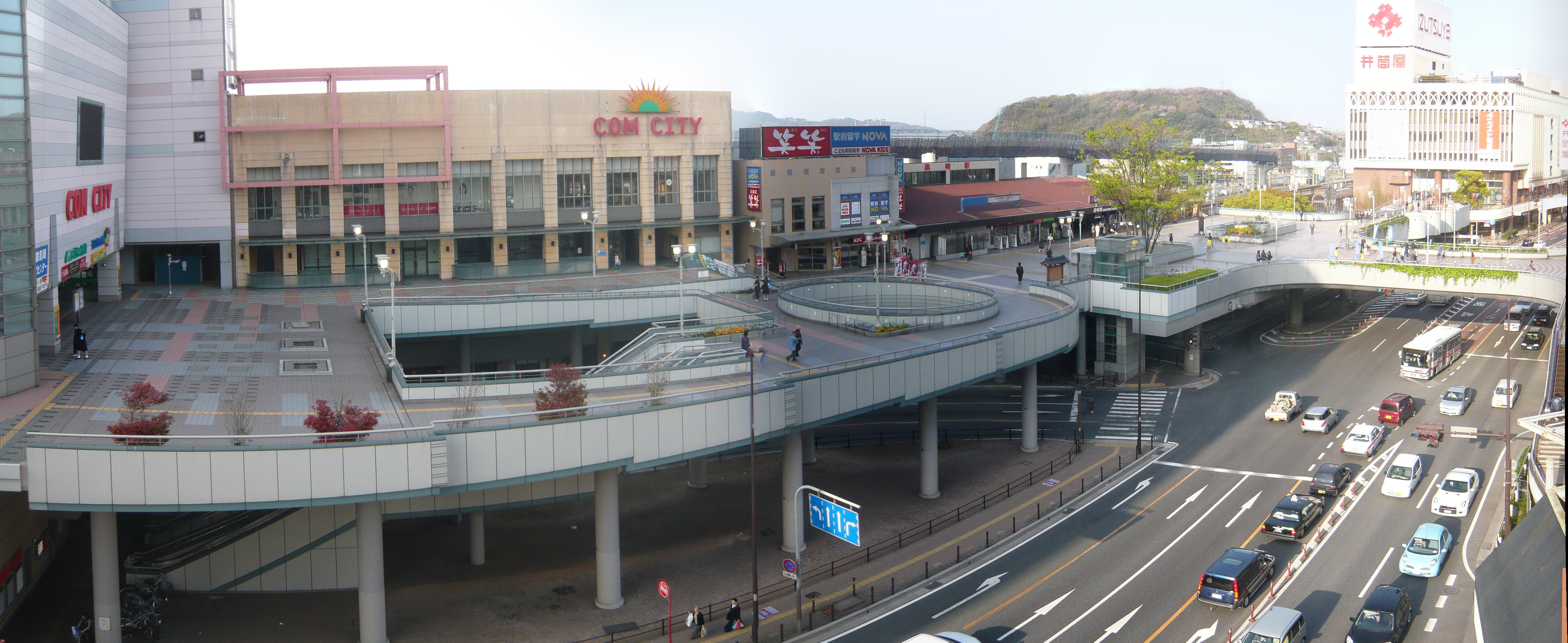
- Panorama of Kurosaki Station

General information
- Location: Yahatanishi Ward, Kitakyushu City; Fukuoka Prefecture; Japan
- Operator: JR Kyushu; Chikuhō Electric Railroad
- Lines: JA Kagoshima Main Line; Fukuhoku Yutaka Line; Chikuhō Electric Railroad Line
- Connections: Bus stop

Other information
- Station code: CK01 (Chikuhō); JA21 (Kagashima Line)

History
- Opened: 28 February 1891; 135 years ago
Location
- Location within Fukuoka Prefecture Location within Kyushu Location within Japan

Kurosaki Station (黒崎駅) is a railway station in Yahatanishi-ku, Kitakyushu serving Kagoshima Main Line, Fukuhoku Yutaka Line and Chikuhō Electric Railroad Line. It was first opened in 1891. Express trains, including the Sonic, stop here.

== Lines ==
- JR Kyūshū
  - Kagoshima Main Line
  - Fukuhoku Yutaka Line
- Chikuhō Electric Railroad
  - Chikuhō Electric Railroad Line

== JR limited express trains ==
- Sonic (Hakata - Yanagigaura/Ōita/Saiki)
- Nichirin Seagaia (Hakata - Miyazaki Kūkō)
- Kirameki (Mojikō/Kokura - Hakata)

== Station facilities ==
=== JR Kyūshū ===
JA 21 Kurosaki Station 黒崎駅
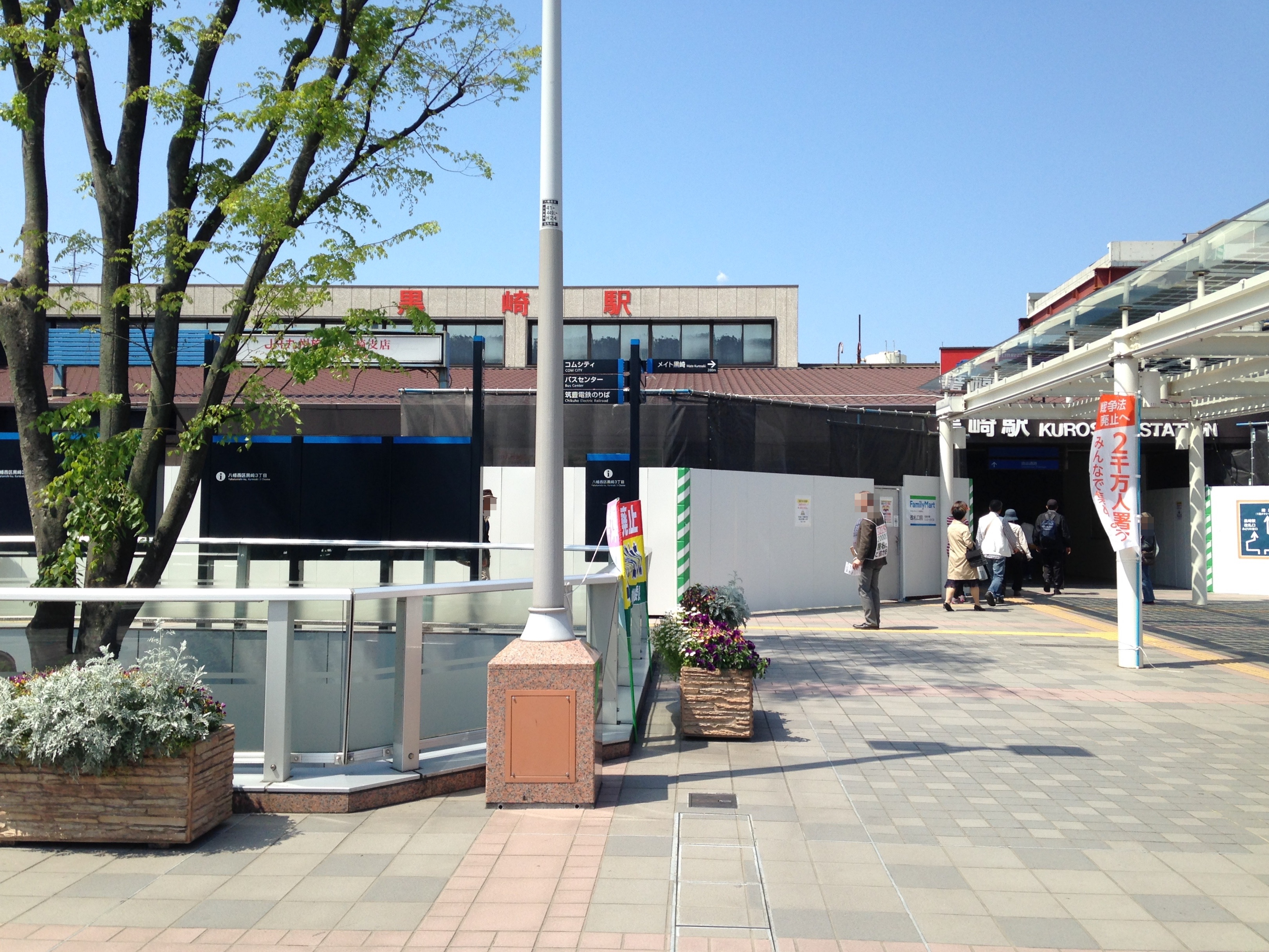
- JR Kyūshū Kurosaki entrance

General information
- Location: 3 Chome-15-1 Kurosaki, Yahatanishi Ward, Kitakyushu City, Fukuoka Prefecture; Japan
- Operator: JR Kyushu
- Lines: JA Kagoshima Main Line; Fukuhoku Yutaka Line
- Platforms: 2 island platforms
- Tracks: 4
- Connections: Bus terminal

Construction
- Structure type: At grade

Other information
- Station code: JA21

History
- Opened: 28 February 1891; 135 years ago

Passengers
- 2017: 15,394 daily

Services
Preceding station	JR Kyushu	Following station
Jinnoharu JA 20 towards Kagoshima	Kagoshima Main Line Local	Yahata JA 22 towards Mojikō
Orio JA 19 towards Kagoshima	Kagoshima Main Line Semi-Rapid Rapid Limited Express	Yahata JA 22 towards Mojikō
Location

=== Overview ===
JR Kurosaki Station is the station serving the Kagoshima Main Line and is the terminus of Fukuhoku Yutaka Line. The station consist of 2 islands serving four tracks and handles an average of 15,000 passengers a day. At the south exit of the station there is a pedway that also serves as a station square, connecting the Izutsuya department store on the east side with the commercial area on the south side.

=== Station layout ===
1	■ Limited Express Sonic, Nichirin Seagaia	for Kashii and Hakata
1	■ Limited Express Kirameki	for Hakata
1	■ Kagoshima Main Line	for Kashii, Hakata and Ōmuta
1	■ Fukuhoku Yutaka Line	for Nōgata, Iizuka and Hakata
2	■ Limited Express Sonic, Nichirin Seagaia	for Oita, Miyazaki, and Miyazaki Kūkō
2	■ Limited Express Kirameki	for Kokura and Mojikō
2	■ Kagoshima Main Line	for Kokura and Mojikō
3	■ Fukuhoku Yutaka Line	for Nōgata and Iizuka (Used for first departures)
4	■ Kagoshima Main Line	for Kokura and Mojikō (Used for through service from Fukuhoku Yutaka Line)|}

=== Adjacent stations ===
←	Service	→
Kyushu Railway Company
Kagoshima Main Line
JA 22 Yahaba	Local	JA 20 Jinnoharu
JA 22 Yahaba	Semi-Rapid	JA 19 Orio
JA 22 Yahaba	Rapid	JA 19 Orio
Fukuhoku Yutaka Line
-	Local	JA 20 Jinnoharu
-	Rapid	JA 20 Jinnoharu

=== Chikuhō Electric Railroad ===
Kurosaki-Ekimae Station 黒崎駅前駅
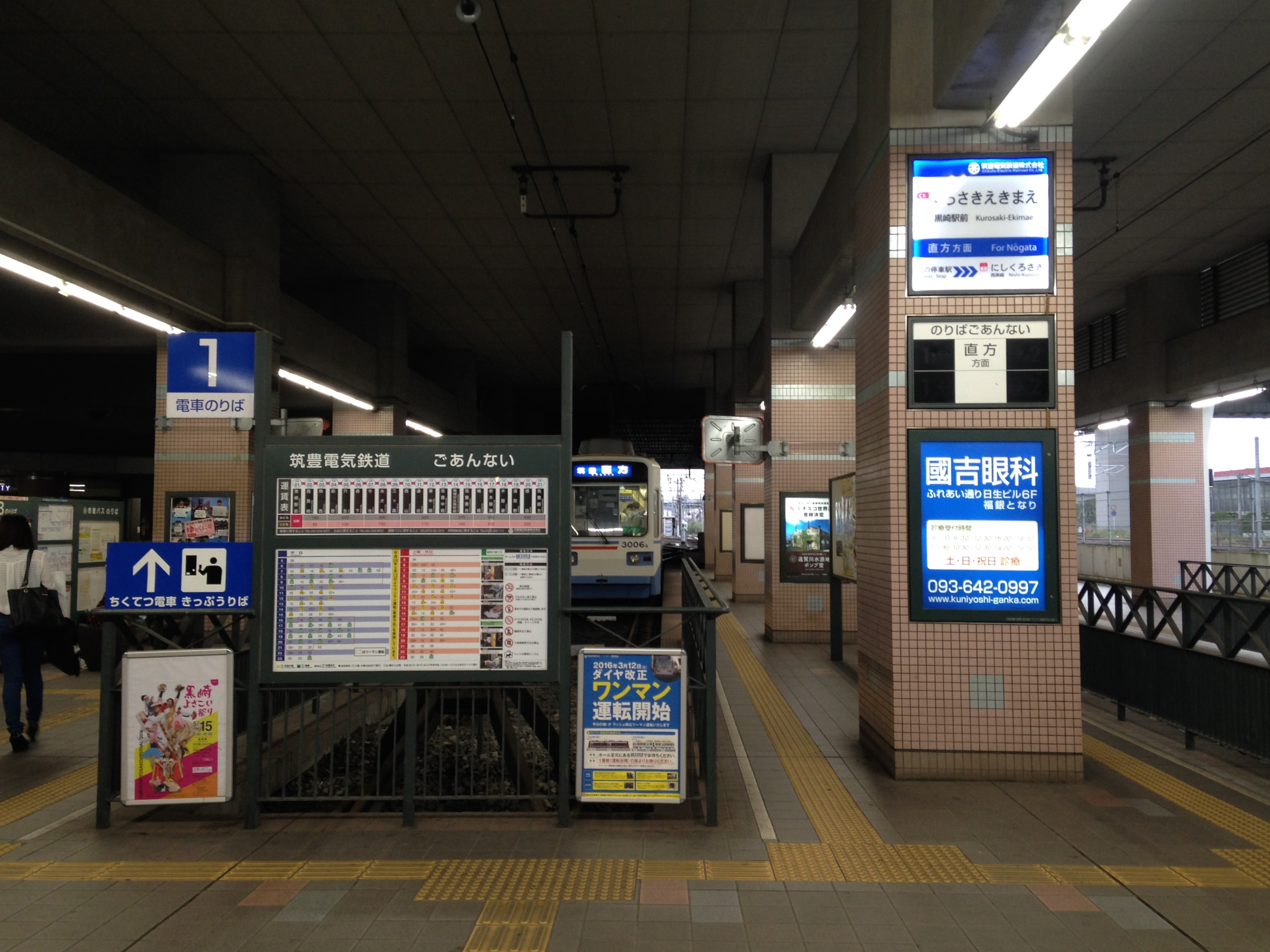
- Kurosaki-Ekimae Station platform

General information
- Location: 3 Chome-15-1 Kurosaki, Yahatanishi, Kitakyushu, Fukuoka; Japan
- System: Chikuhō Electric Railroad station
- Operator: Chikuhō Electric Railroad
- Line: Chikuhō Electric Railroad Line
- Platforms: 2 side platform, 1 island platform
- Connections: Bus terminal

Other information
- Station code: CK 01

History
- Opened: 1911

Passengers
- 2013: 8,850 daily
Location

=== Overview ===
Kurosaki-Ekimae Station is the terminus of Chikuhō Electric Railroad Line opened on 15 July 1911. The station consist of 3 platforms serving two tracks and handles an average of 8,000 passengers a day.

=== Adjacent station ===
←	Service	→
Chikuhō Electric Railroad Line
Terminus	Local	Nishi-Kurosaki
