= Ainoshima Stone Tumuli =

Archaeological site in Japan

- 相島積石塚群 (Japanese)
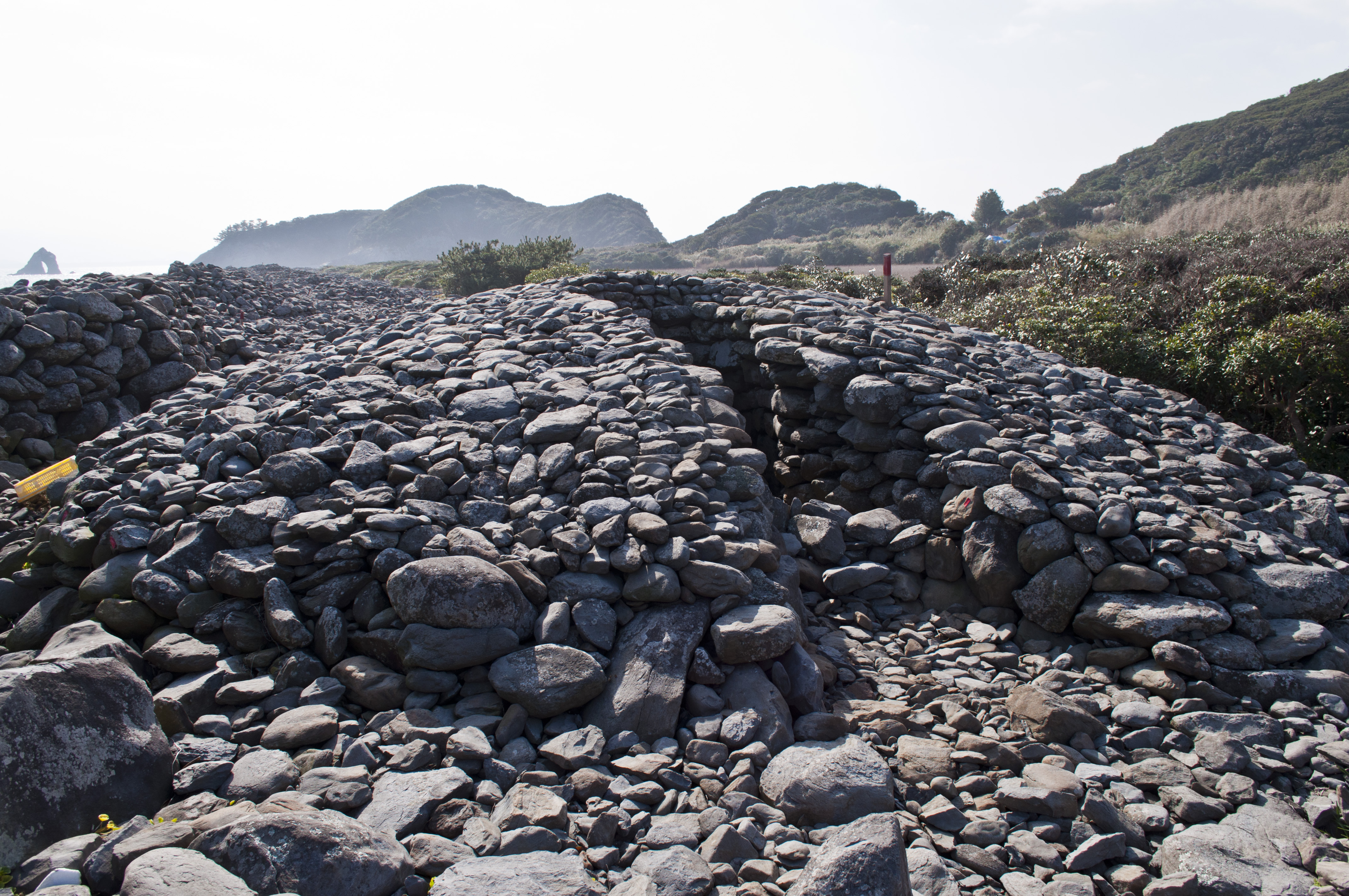
- Ainoshima Stone Tumuli

- Ainoshima Stone Tumuli Ainoshima Stone Tumuli (Japan)
- 33°45′42.0″N 130°22′34.0″E
- Type: Kofun
- Periods: Kofun period
- Location: Ainoshima, Shingū, Fukuoka, Japan
- Region: Kyushu

History
- Built: c. 4th to 7th century

Site notes
- Public access: Yes (no facilities)
- National Historic Site of Japan

The Ainoshima Stone Tumuli (相島積石塚群, Ainoshima tsumiishitsuka-gun) is a Kofun period necropolis, located on the island of Ainoshima in the town of Shingū, Kasuya District, Fukuoka Prefecture Japan. The tumulus was designated a National Historic Site of Japan in 2001.

== Overview ==
The Ainoshima Stone Tumuli consist of total of 254 stone mounds made entirely of basalt gravel are distributed in the northeastern part of Ainoshima, along a coastline extending approximately 500 meters from north-to-south. It was discovered in 1992. This group of stone mounds are mainly small circular or rectangular tombs with a diameter of about three to five meters, but there are also some that are two-tiered with a side of 12 meters, and others that have their main parts dug directly into the ground. No grave markers or border marks the site, and it is unknown how much of the original site remains. The main internal features include a vertical stone burial chambers containing a box-type sarcophagus, or a side-pit type stone burial chamber. Most were constructed from the first half of the 5th century to the middle of the 6th century, but the earliest construction can definitely be traced back to the early Kofun period. On the opposite shore in the northeast direction from this site, is the Munakata area, where many burial mounds from the same period are concentrated, and it is possible to assume that there is a connection there, as well as connections with the Korean Peninsula.

A variety of artifacts have been unearthed, including numerous grave goods, iron products, and human bones. It is theorized that the tombs belong to the Kaijin tribe, who lived mainly lived in the coastal areas of Chikuzen Province and Hizen Province (as well as the southern coast of the Korean Peninsula during the Yayoi period. The Kaijin, whom some researchers theorize migrated to this area from southeastern China or the South Pacific in prehistoric times, practiced rice cultivation, used bronze tools, and are presumed to have excellent navigation and fishing skills. They became powerful through maritime transportation from the 4th century onwards, and were eventually assimilated into Japanese, but much about them remains unknown.

It is also said that the stones used in the stone chambers of the Tsuyazaki Kofun Cluster in Fukutsu, Fukuoka, and Munakata City, which were built during the same period, were transported from here.

The site is approximately a 30-minute walk from the Ainoshima Ferry Terminal.

== See also ==
- List of Historic Sites of Japan (Fukuoka)
