= Imayama Site =

- 今山遺跡 (Japanese)
- Imayama Site Imayama Site (Japan)
- Interactive map of Imayama Site
- 33°35′22″N 130°15′46″E
- Type: industrial site
- Periods: Yayoi period
- Location: Nishi-ku, Fukuoka, Japan
- Region: Kyushu

Site notes
- Public access: Yes (no facilities)

Imayama Site (今山遺跡, Imayama iseki) is an archaeological site with the ruins of a Yayoi period stone tool production site located in the Yokohama neighborhood of Nishi-ku, Fukuoka, Japan. It was designated as a National Historic Site in 1993, with the area under protection expanded in 2003.

== Overview ==
The Imayama Site is located on a small hill at an elevation of 82 meters, located in the northwestern part of Fukuoka City, on the Itoshima Plain on the Hakata Bay coast. Originally, this hill was about 500 meters north-to-south and 300 meters east-to-west, but the northern half has been leveled and is now a residential area. The site was discovered in 1923 by a professor at Kyushu Imperial University, and as a result of several subsequent archaeological excavations, was found to contain ruins over a wide area, including near the basalt outcrop at the summit, the mid-slopes on the south and southeast sides, and at the foot of the mountain. A large amount of basalt fragments, including lithic flakes from the lithic reduction process of making stone axes, were found mixed with unfinished stone axes and hammerstones. In addition, many unfinished stone axes that were damaged during the production process were unearthed on the gentle slope at the foot of the mountain at an elevation of around five meters. A thick clam-blade stone ax that was around 8 by 20 centimeters with a thickness of 5 centimeters and weight of 1.5 to 2 kilograms was found, and is thought to have been designed for cutting down trees. The production of these stone axes began at the beginning of the Yayoi period, but the number increased dramatically in the middle of the Yayoi period. Stone axes from this site have been found distributed over a wide area of northern Kyushu.

Other artifacts found in stratification layers included Jōmon pottery from the early and middle Jōmon periods, bronze swords from the Yayoi period, and salt-making earthenware from the early Kofun period. The site is approximately a 17-minute walk from Kyūdai-Gakkentoshi Station on the JR Kyushu Chikuhi Line.

== See also ==
- List of Historic Sites of Japan (Fukuoka)
