= Antokudai Site =

Yayoi period archaeological site in Japan

- 安徳台遺跡 (Japanese)
- Antokudai Site Antokudai Site (Japan)
- 33°29′36.5″N 130°25′26.7″E
- Type: Settlement
- Periods: Yayoi period
- Location: Nakagawa, Fukuoka, Japan
- Region: Kyushu

History
- Built: c.1st century

Site notes
- Public access: Yes (no facilities)
- National Historic Site of Japan

The Antokudai Site (安徳台遺跡) is an archaeological site with the traces of a Yayoi period settlement, located in the city of Nakagawa, Fukuoka Prefecture, Japan. The site was designated a National Historic Site of Japan in 2019.

== Overview ==
The Antokudai site is contains the remains of a large-scale village that existed from the early middle to early late Yayoi period, or approximately 2000 years ago. Research to date has uncovered the remains of more than 130 residences and numerous burial mounds, including one of the largest pit dwellings in Japan with a diameter of more than 15 meters, as well as remains of pit dwellings where metal casting-related artifacts such as bronze molds, and tools reused from imported iron axes have been unearthed. In addition to Yayoi pottery, artifacts have included glass magatama, iron swords and daggers and shell bracelets made from Sinustrombus latissimus shells, which are only found in the South Pacific. In one of the graves, a shell bracket was found still attached to the human skeleton's right arm, and a glass item believed to have been used as a hair ornament was also found near the skull. It is believed that this was the central village where the rulers of the country of Nakoku (奴国, Nakoku, Na-no-Kuni), which is mentioned in ancient Chinese records. resided.

According to the Book of the Later Han, in 57 CE, Emperor Guangwu of Han granted Nakoku an imperial seal, patterned after the Chinese jade seals, but made of gold: the king of Na gold seal. In return, that same year, Na sent envoys to the Chinese capital, offering tribute and formal New Year's greetings. This seal was discovered over 1500 years later, by an Edo period farmer on Shikanoshima Island, thus helping to verify the existence of Nakoku, which was otherwise known only from the ancient chronicles. Engraved upon it are the Chinese characters 漢委奴國王 (Kan no Wa no Na-no-Koku-ō, "King of the Na state of the Wa (vassal) of Han".

A reference is found in vol. 30 of the Chinese Book of Wei from the Records of the Three Kingdoms, titled "The Account of the Easterners: A Note on the Wa" (Chinese: 東夷傳‧倭人條), to the continued existence of Nakoku in the 3rd century, naming the officials and stating that it contains over 20,000 homes. This section is known in Japan as the Gishi Wajinden (魏志倭人伝; Records of Wei: An Account of the Wa).

The site is located approximately 4.6 kilometers south-southwest of Hakataminami Station on the Kyushu Shinkansen.

== See also ==
- List of Historic Sites of Japan (Fukuoka)
