= Kagenouma Kōgoishi =

Castle ruins in Iizuka, Fukuoka, Japan

- 鹿毛馬神籠石
- Iizuka, Fukuoka, Japan
- Kagenouma Kōgoishi

Site information
- Type: Korean-style fortress
- Condition: Ruins

Location
- Coordinates: 33°40′37″N 130°44′4″E

Site history
- Built: c.late 7th century
- Built by: Yamato court
- In use: Asuka period
- Kagenouma Kōgoishi (Fukuoka Prefecture) Kagenouma Kōgoishi (Japan) National Historic Site of Japan

Kagenouma Kōgoishi (鹿毛馬神籠石) was an ancient castle (also known as a Korean-style fortresses in Japan (朝鮮式山城, Chōsen-shiki yamajiro) located in the Kageuma neighborhood of the city of Iizuka, Fukuoka Prefecture Japan. Its ruins have been protected as a National Historic Site since 1945, with the area under protection expanded in 2002.

== History ==
After the defeat of the combined Baekje and Yamato Japan forces, at the hands of the Silla and Tang China alliance at the Battle of Hakusukinoe in 663, the Yamato court feared an invasion from either or both Tang or Silla. In response, a huge network of shore fortifications was constructed throughout the rest of the 600s, often with the assistance of Baekje engineers, generals and artisans. Unaware of the outbreak of the Silla-Tang War (670–676), the Japanese would continue to build fortifications until 701, even after finding out that Silla was no longer friendly with Tang.

The Kagenouma Kōgoishi is located on a low horseshoe-shaped hill at an elevation of just under 80 meters facing the Kagema River, a tributary of the Onga River. There are rows of stones around the outside of the ridge, and the total length is 1980 meters. Approximately 1800 granite stones with a width of 40 to 80 centimeters were used. The stone rows are in relatively good preservation, but raise a number of questions. The height of the wall is low, and can easily be jumped over in combat, and there is no surviving evidence of the rammed-earth palisade which is found at other sites. The site includes the ruins of two water gates; however, unlike other sites, these water gates are small and are not protected by moats or stronger stone walls. The date of construction for these ruins is also uncertain. They are estimated to date from the first half of the 7th century based solely on the shards of a Sue ware jat found in an archaeological excavation of the water gate ruins conducted from December 1983 to February 1984.

The site is approximately ten minutes by car from Kotake Station on the JR Kyushu Fukuhoku Yutaka Line

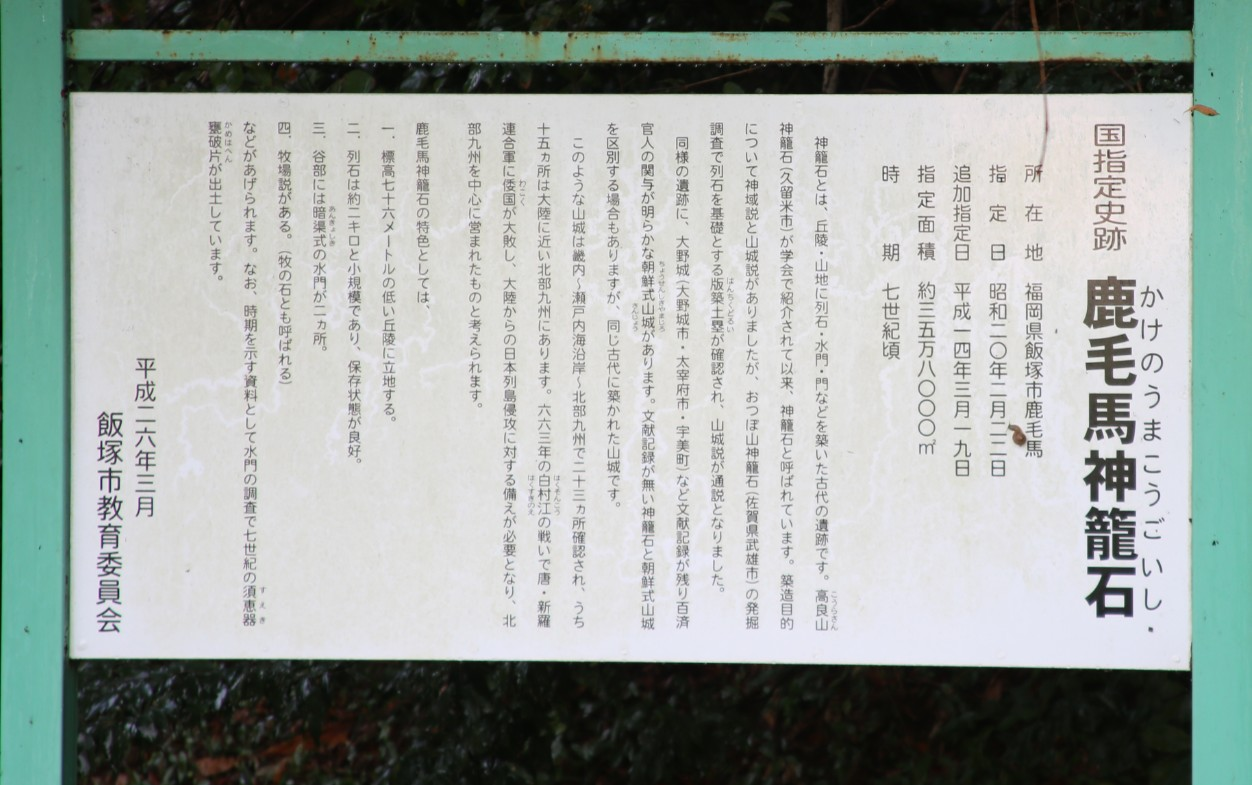
Explanatory placard

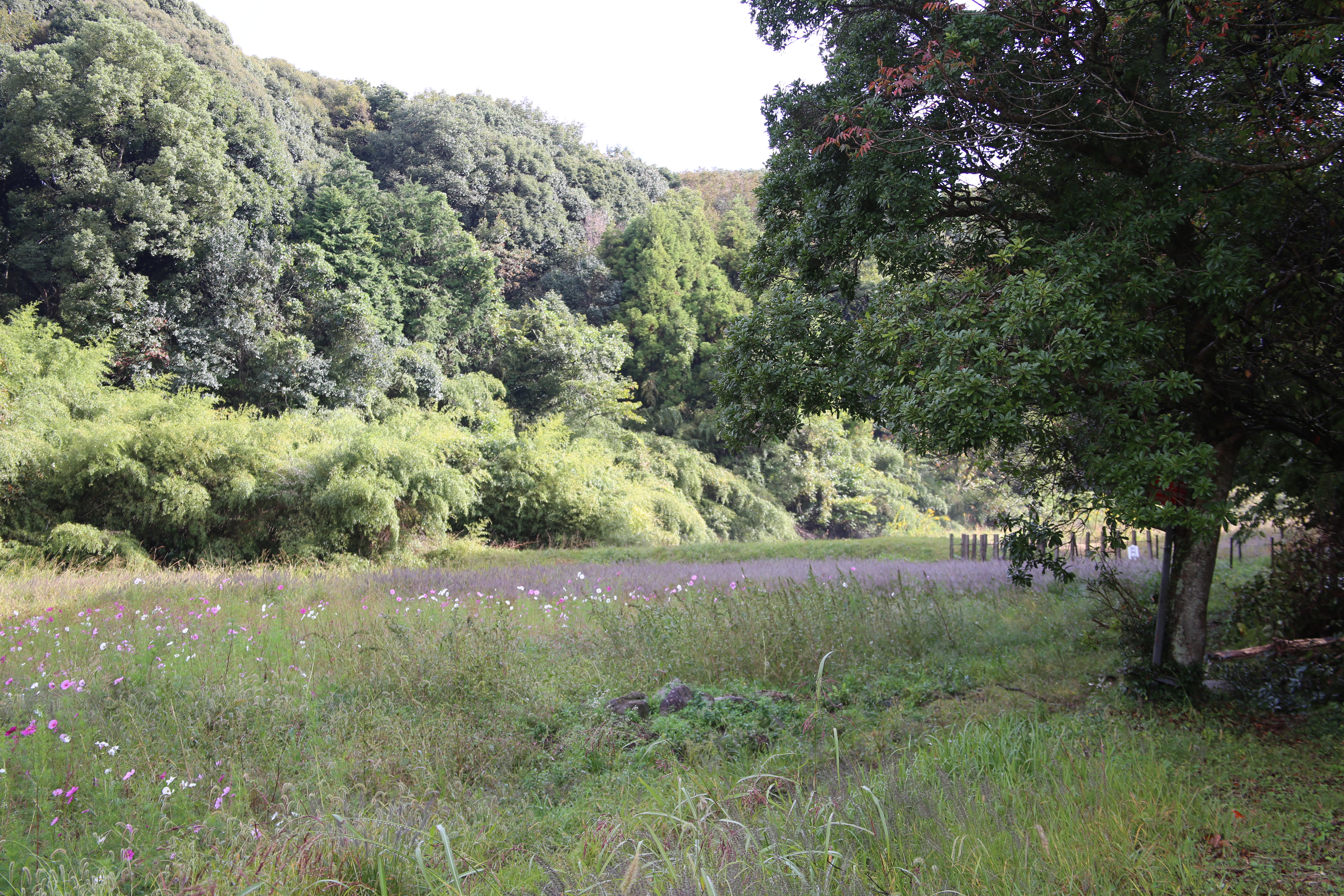
panoramic view

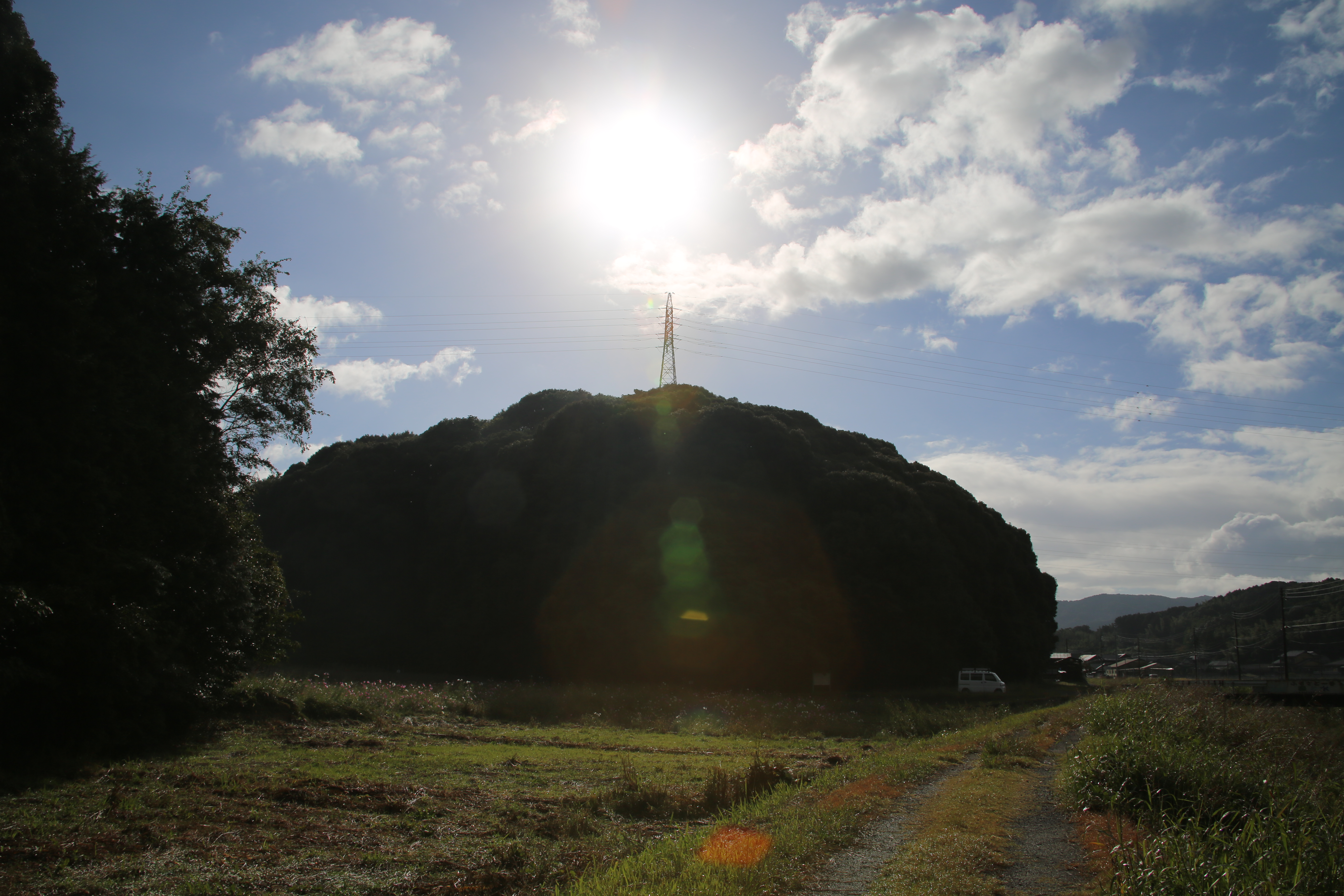
panoramic view

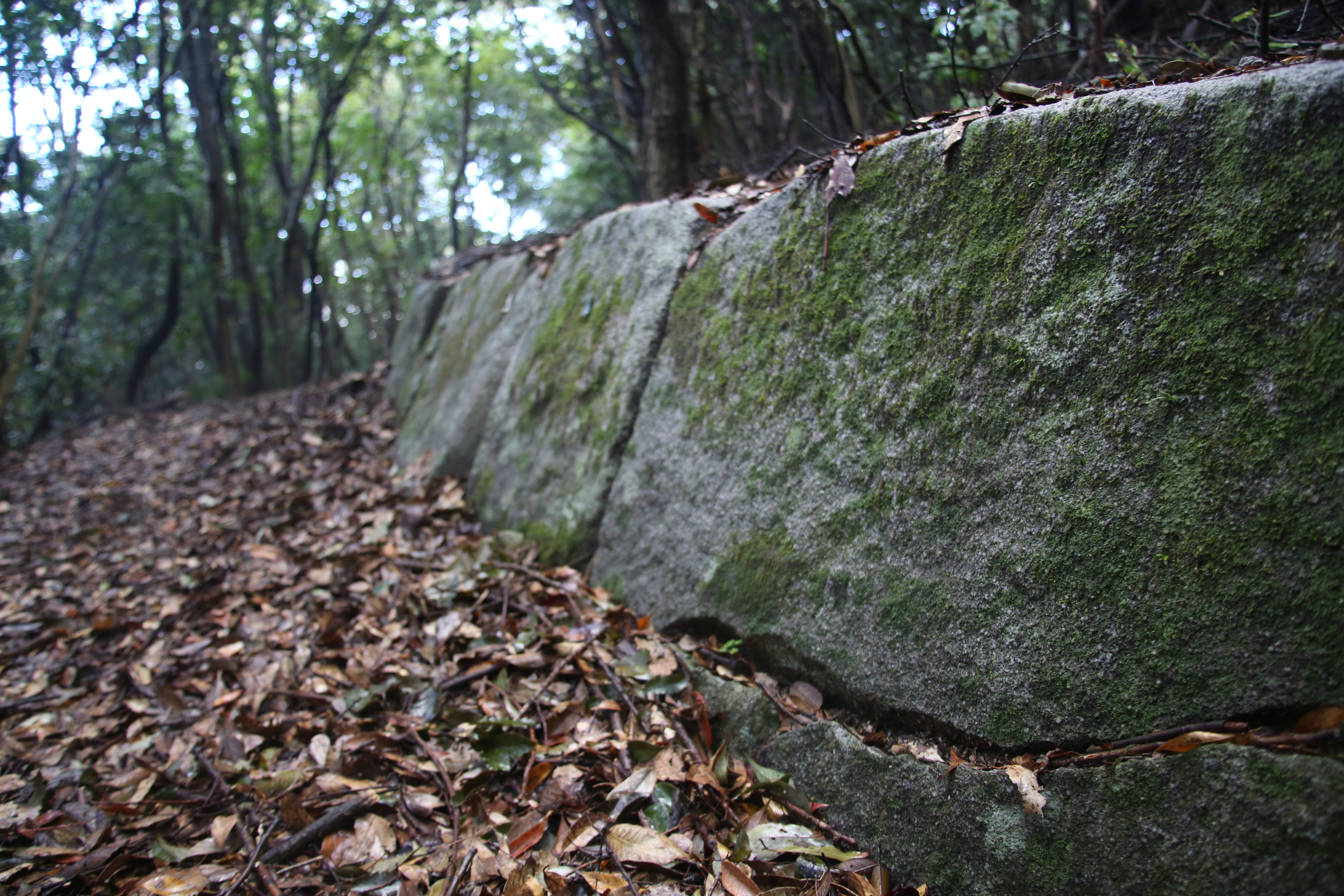
stone rows

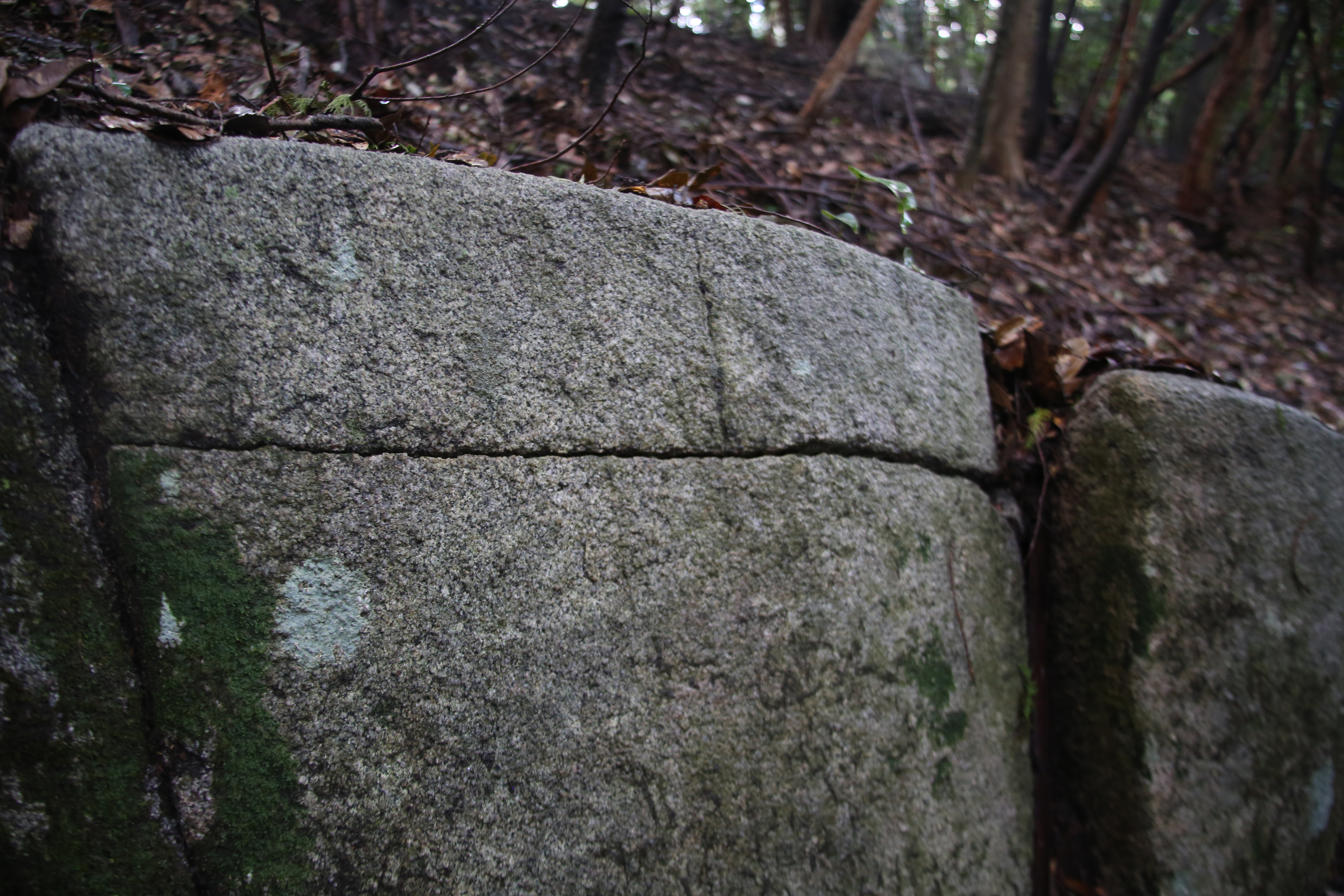
stone rows

== See also ==
- List of Historic Sites of Japan (Fukuoka)
- List of foreign-style castles in Japan
- Kōgoishi

== Literature ==
- De Lange, William (2021). An Encyclopedia of Japanese Castles. Groningen: Toyo Press. pp. 600 pages. ISBN 978-9492722300.
- Motoo, Hinago (1986). Japanese Castles. Tokyo: Kodansha. pp. 200 pages. ISBN 0-87011-766-1.
