= Imajuku Kofun Cluster =

Kofun period burial mound in Nishi-ku, Fukuoka, Japan

- 今宿古墳群 (Japanese)
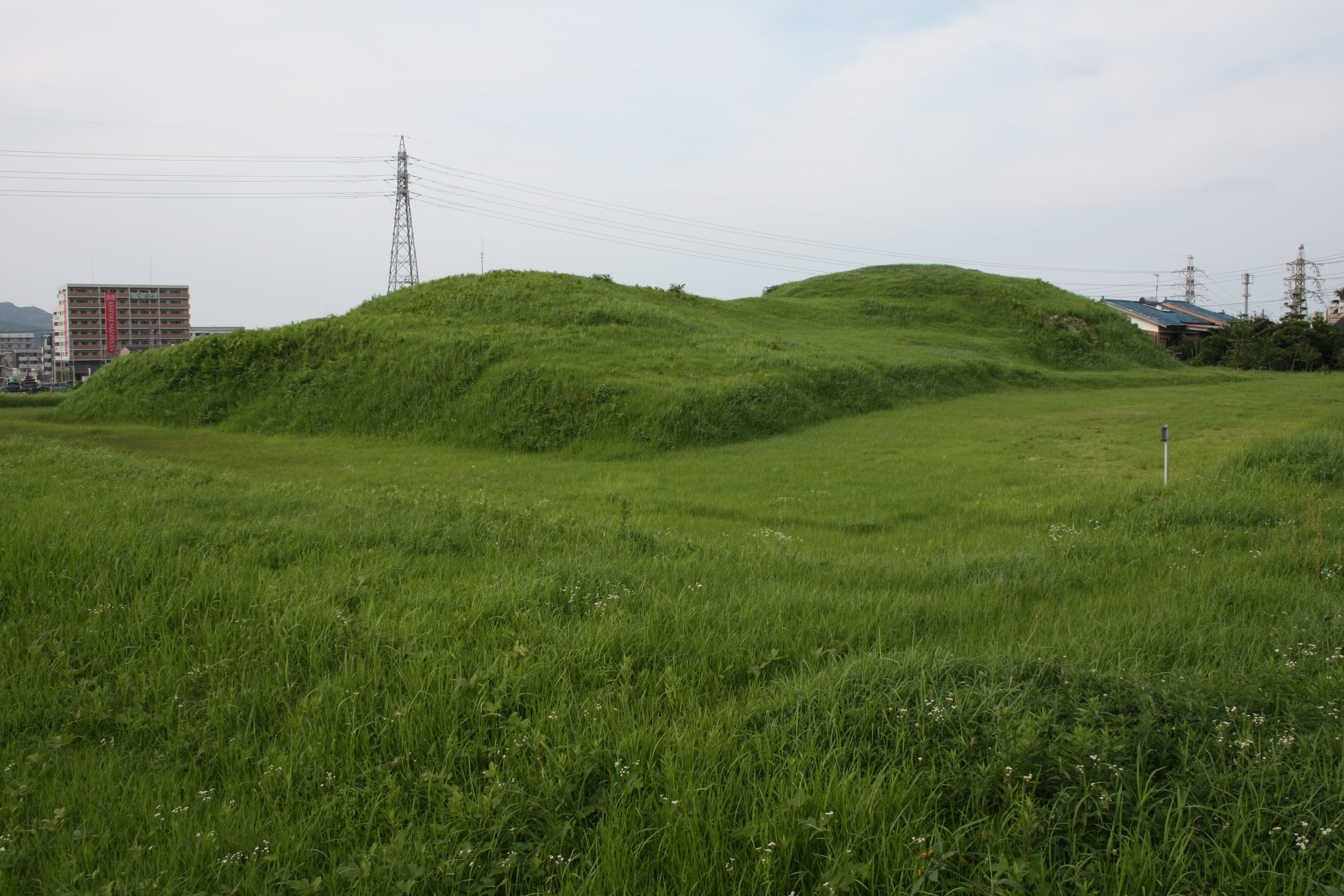
- Imajuku Otsuka Kofun

- Imajuku Kofun Cluster Imajuku Kofun Cluster (Japan)
- Interactive map of Imajuku Kofun Cluster
- 33°33′54″N 130°14′46″E
- Type: Kofun
- Periods: Kofun period
- Location: Nishi-ku, Fukuoka, Japan
- Region: Kyushu

History
- Built: c.4th - 6th century

Site notes
- Public access: Yes (no facilities)

The Imajuku Kofun Cluster (今宿古墳群, Imajuku Kofun-gun) is a group Kofun period burial mounds, located in Nishi-ku, Fukuoka Japan. Three of the burial mounds were designated individually as National Historic Sites of Japan in 1928. In 2004, these three tumuli were consolidated with four additional tumuli and the name was changed to the "Imajuku Kofun Cluster".

== Overview ==
The Imajuku Kofun Cluster consists of more than 350 tumuli in an area extending three kilometers east-to-west and 1.5 kilometers north-to-south in the Imajuku Plain on the west side of Hakata Bay and the hills behind it in western Fukuoka City. These include 11 zenpō-kōen-fun (前方後円墳), which is shaped like a keyhole, having one square end and one circular end, when viewed from above. The keyhole-shaped tumuli are known to have been constructed over a period of approximately 150 years from the mid-4th century to the early 6th century, including three that are known to have existed, but have now disappeared. Cases in which keyhole-shaped tumuli were continuously constructed throughout the Kofun period in the same region are rare nationwide. The three tumuli which were covered in the initial 1928 National Historic Site designation are:

Sukizaki Kofun (鋤崎古墳) located at the eastern end of the group, the Sukizaki Kofun is believed to have been constructed in the latter half of the 4th century. It is 62 meters long, seven meters high, and built in three stages. There is a horizontal-entry cave-style stone burial chamber which contained three clay coffins, and one small stone coffin. It was excavated from 1981 to 1983. Grave goods included five bronze mirrors. 240 beads, two iron swords, six iron daggers, two iron halberds, 14 iron tools, five needles and Haji ware pottery. Haniwa found on the mound included cylindrical, morning glory-shaped, pot-shaped, and various figurative haniwa.

Marukumayama Kofun (丸隈山古墳) is the largest in the cluster, with a total length of 84.6 meters. The posterior circular portion has a diameter of 60 meters, and the width of the anterior rectangular portion is 25 meters. It is estimated to date from the first half of the 5th century. The horizontal-entry stone burial chamber made of basalt and the sarcophagus inside is open to the public. It was opened in the Edo period, and records state that bronze mirrors, iron swords, iron arrowheads, and other items were found inside, including Tomoe-shaped bronze vessels, magatama beads, and cylindrical beads.

Imajuku Otsuka Kofun (今宿大塚古墳) has a length of 64 meters. It is surrounded by a shield-shaped moat 8 to 12 meters wide, with an outer embankment. It is located on a low plateau at the northern foot of Mt. Koso, orientated to the west. It dates from the first half of the 6th century. Cylindrical, warrior and horse-shaped haniwa have been found in the outer embankment, along with Sue ware pottery. The burial chamber remains unexcavated.

The four tumuli additionally designated in 2004 are:

Wakahachimangū Kofun (若八幡宮古墳) is located on the south side of the Imajuku Bypass within the grounds of a Shinto shrine. It is approximately in the center of the group. It was built on a hill at an altitude of 29 meters derived from the Mt. Koso massif, and is orientated to the north. The tumulus has a length of 47 meters, with a 25-meter diameter circular portion and was constructed in three stages at the rear and two stages at the front. The mound is covered with fukiishi. The burial chamber contained a hollow boat-shaped wooden coffin (made of cedar) with a length of 2.75 meters and a width of 1.2 meters, placed perpendicular to the long axis of the tumulus. Grave good included a triangular-rimmed bronze mirror of two gods and two beasts, an iron ring-headed sword, iron dagger, iron arrowheads, and beads. It also included rectangular plate leather-bound short armor, which is one of the oldest in Japan. Based on these grave goods, it is thought to have been constructed in the latter half of the 4th century, and is thus one of the oldest in the cluster.

Yamanohana No. 1 Kofun (山ノ鼻一号墳), is the oldest of the group and is believed to have been built in the mid-4th century. It is located on a hill northeast of Wakahachimangu Kofun, across from the Imajuku Bypass. The tumulus has been mostly destroyed, but excavations confirm that its original length was 44 meters, with a 27 meter diameter circular portion, and 20 meter wide rectangular portion.It was found that the rear round part was built in three tiers and the front part in two tiers, and the mound was covered with fukiishi. No haniwa were found. Most of the burial chamber had been destroyed, but fragments of bronze mirrors and Haji ware potter have been unearthed.

Kabutozuka Kofun (兜塚古墳) is located at the tip of a hill extending from Mt. Koso on the west side of the group. It was initially thought to be a circular tumulus, but excavations in 1994, 1995 and 2003 revealed that it was a zenpō-kōen-fun with an original length of over 53 meters, with a 43-meter diameter circular portion and height of six meters. It was constructed in two stages, and each slope covered with fukiishi and haniwa. The burial chamber had been robbed in the Edo period, but it appears that it had been used for multiple burials. Remaining grave goods recovered included glass beads, weapons such as armor, iron arrowheads and swords, and horse equipment. It was built in the latter half of the 5th century.

Iiji Futatsuka Kofun (飯氏二塚古墳) is located on a hill with an elevation of 30-35 meters, that extends to the eastern edge of the Itoshima Plain. It was excavated in 1993 and 2002 and determined to have a length of 49.6 meters with a diameter of 27.3 meters at the rear circle, a width of 36.9 meters at the front, and a height of five meters. There was no trace of haniwa or a moat. The burial chamber is perpendicular to the long axis of the mound, but was in very poor condition. It appears that there were at least two burials and from fragments of beads, horse fittings and Sue ware pottery, it is believed that it was constructed in the early 6th century.

The Marukumayama Kofun is about a 15-minute walk from Susenji Station on the JR Kyushu Chikuhi Line. The Imajuku Otsuka Kofun is about a 15-minute walk from Imajuku Station on the JR Kyushu Chikuhi Line.

== See also ==
- List of Historic Sites of Japan (Fukuoka)
