= Tanushimaru Kofun Cluster =

- 田主丸古墳群 (Japanese)
- Tanushimaru Kofun Cluster Tanushimaru Kofun Cluster (Japan)
- Interactive map of Tanushimaru Kofun Cluster
- 33°19′32″N 130°42′42″E
- Type: Kofun cluster
- Periods: Kofun period
- Location: Kurume, Fukuoka, Japan
- Region: Kyushu

History
- Built: c.6th century

Site notes
- Public access: Yes (no facilities)

The Tanushimaru Kofun Cluster (田主丸古墳群, Tanushimaru kofun-gun) is a group of Kofun period burial mounds, located in the Tanushimaru neighborhood of the city of Kurume, Fukuoka Prefecture Japan. The tumulus cluster was designated a National Historic Site of Japan in 1961.

== Overview ==
The Tanushimaru Kofun Cluster a general term for the burial mounds in the former Tanushimaru town, and is located on a plateau at the northern foot of the Minou Mountains overlooking the Chikugo Plain. The National Historic Site designation covers four kofun.

Tanushimaru Ōtsuka Kofun

The Tanushimaru Ōtsuka Kofun (主丸大塚古墳) is a zenpō-kōen-fun (前方後円墳), which is shaped like a keyhole, having one square end and one circular end, when viewed from above. It has a total length of 103 meters, and the posterior circular portion has a diameter of 60 meters, making it one of the largest in northern Kyushu. It is orientated to the south. The surface of the mound has fukiishi, but no haniwa have been found. Most of the anterior portion of the mound has been leveled by land clearing and it was previously thought to have been an enpun (円墳)-style circular tumulus. It has been excavated several times, starting in the late Edo Period. The burial chamber is a horizontal-entry stone chamber, but the details are not clear as the interior has not been excavated. Although there is a high possibility that the burial chamber was not subject to major grave robbery and is also a decorated kofun, the investigation of the interior was handed over to future generations, and it was maintained in its current state.

This tumulus is estimated to have been constructed in the late Kofun period, around the latter half of the 6th century, as afterthat time, the construction of keyhole-shaped tumuli came to a halt due to regulations following the Iwai Rebellion.

Jitoku Kofun

The Jitoku Kofun (寺徳古墳) is an enpun (円墳)-style circular tumulus located at the lowest elevation among the Tanushimaru cluster. It was built in the latter half of the 6th century and has a multi-chambered stone burial chamber that opens to the west. The diameter of the mound is 18 meters and the height is approximately three meters. It is a decorated kofun, and on the back and side walls of the burial chamber, triangular patterns, shields, ships, etc. are drawn around concentric circles, and the concentric circles on the back wall are especially boldly drawn in red and green.

Nakabaru Kitsunezuka Kofun

The tumulus of the Nakabaru Kitsunezuka Kofun (中原狐塚古墳) has mostly been washed away, but it was originally an enpun-style circular tomb with a diameter of 19 meters.The inside of the double-chambered stone burial chamber had decorative murals. Grave goods included bow fittings and iron arrowheads.

Nishidate Kofun

The Nishinodate Kofun (西館古墳) has an oval shape with a long axis of 14 meters and a short axis of 10.4 meters, and there are also decorative paintings inside the multi-chambered stone burial chamber.

Currently, the site is open to the public as Ōtsuka Kofun Historical Park; however, the tumuli are sealed to protect the decorative paintings inside.

== See also ==
- List of Historic Sites of Japan (Fukuoka)
- Decorated kofun
