= Maehata Site =

Castle ruins in Chikushino, Fukuoka, Japan

- 前畑遺跡
- Chikushino, Fukuoka, Japan

Site information
- Type: Korean-style fortress
- Condition: Ruins

Location
- Maehata Site
- Location within Fukuoka Prefecture Location within Japan
- Coordinates: 33°27′31.23″N 130°33′10.42″E

Site history
- Built: c.7th century
- Built by: Yamato court
- In use: Asuka period
- National Historic Site of Japan

Maehata Site (前畑遺跡, Maehata iseki) are ruins of what appear to be a kōgoishi (also known as a Korean-style fortresses in Japan (朝鮮式山城, Chōsen-shiki yamajiro) located in the city of Chikushino, Fukuoka Prefecture Japan. The ruins have been protected as a National Historic Site since March, 2025.

== History ==
After the defeat of the combined Baekje and Yamato Japan forces, at the hands of the Silla and Tang China alliance at the Battle of Hakusukinoe in 663, the Yamato court feared an invasion from either or both Tang or Silla. In response, a huge network of shore fortifications was constructed throughout the rest of the 600s, often with the assistance of Baekje engineers, generals and artisans. Unaware of the outbreak of the Silla-Tang War (670–676), the Japanese would continue to build fortifications until 701, even after finding out that Silla was no longer friendly with Tang. The name "kōgoishi" means "stones of divine protection," a name given them by the Meiji period archaeologist Tsuboi Shōgorō, who conjectured that they served as spiritual or practical protection for sacred sites. Scholars after Tsuboi determined that the structures are most likely the remains of practical, military fortifications, and were unlikely to have significant spiritual connections, although much remains unknown about these structures and there is very little contemporary documentary evidence.

The Maehata ruins were discovered during an urban redevelopment project outsuide the Chikushi Station west exit in 2015. The archaeological excavation revealed that the earthwork-like remains were built intermittently on top of a hill, utilizing natural ridges. The construction method used was earth piling, a method used in ancient structures. However, this method differs from the earth piling methods used in nearby ancient earthworks and mountain castles, suggesting that civil engineering techniques passed down in ancient times were not uniform. Given its scale, it is believed to have had national involvement and to have functioned in conjunction with the mountain castle and earthen ramparts surrounding ancient Dazaifu.The most distinctive feature of the Maehata Ruins' earthwork remains is its location on a hill, which, along with previously known ruins such as the waterway blocking the lowlands and valleys, may have formed the outer perimeter of ancient Dazaifu, which functioned in unison with the natural topography.

Based on artifacts found around and on top of the earthwork-like remains, it is believed to have been built around the mid-7th century and was used primarily until the late 8th century. The total length of the earthwork-like remains discovered was 558 meters, and it is believed that it was actually longer than that. Of that, 320 meters was designated as a National Historic Site.

As it includes private land, the site is currently not open to the public.

== See also ==
- List of Historic Sites of Japan (Fukuoka)
- List of foreign-style castles in Japan
- Kōgoishi
