= Nokata Site =

Archaeological site in Fukuoka, Japan

- 野方遺跡 (Japanese)
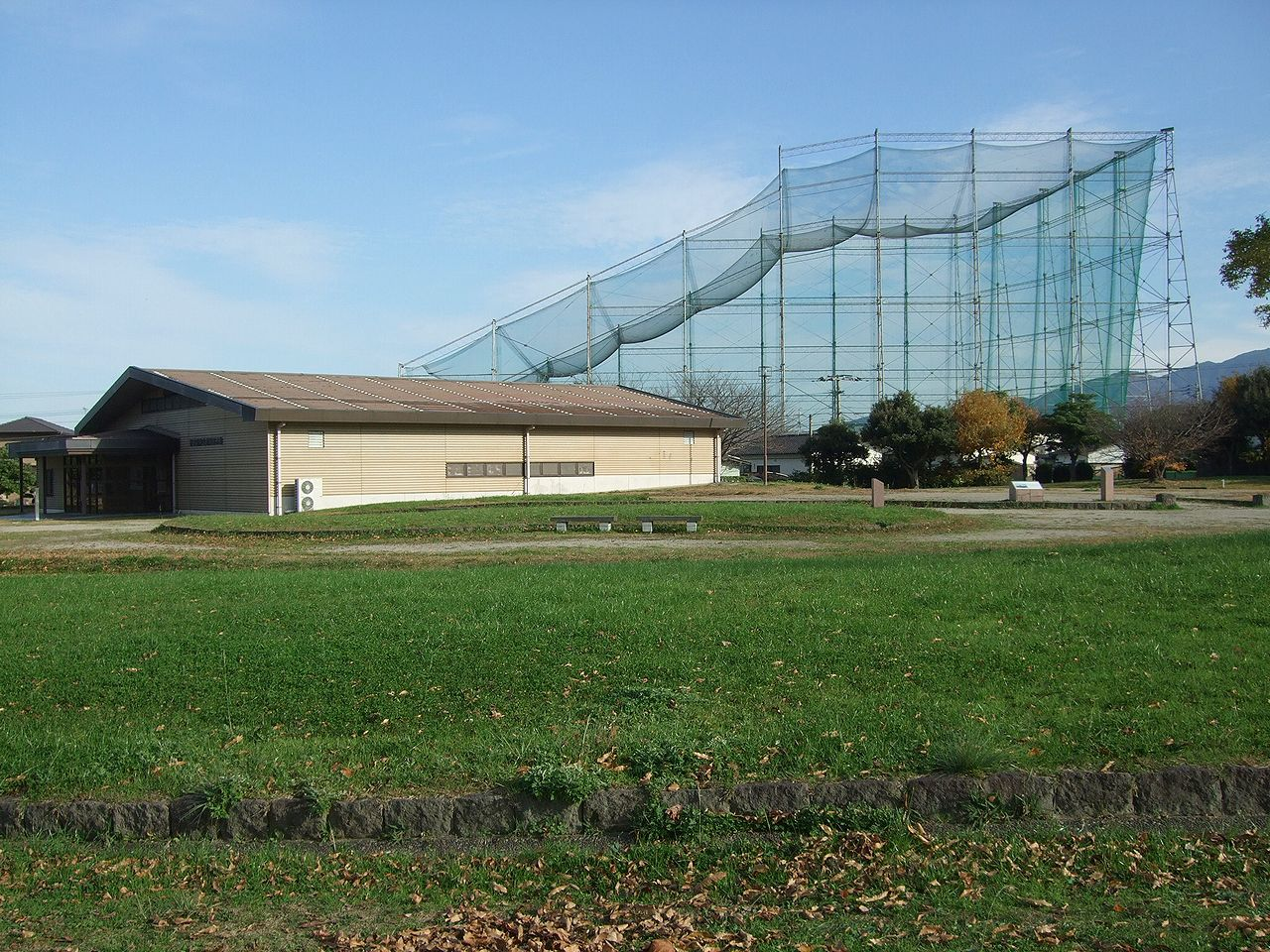
- Nokata Site with Nokata Ruins Dwelling Ruins Exhibition Hall

- Nokata Site Nokata Site (Japan)
- Interactive map of Nokata Site
- 33°33′19″N 130°18′22″E
- Type: settlement
- Periods: Yayoi period
- Location: Nishi-ku, Fukuoka, Japan
- Region: Kyushu

Site notes
- Public access: Yes (park, museum)
- Website: Official website

Nokata Site (野方遺跡, Nokata iseki) is an archaeological site with a late Yayoi period to early Kofun period settlement located in Nishi-ku, Fukuoka, Japan. It was designated as a National Historic Site in 1975.

== Overview ==
The Nokata Site is located on an alluvial fan at an elevation of 17 to 22 meters at the eastern foot of Mount Kano in the northeastern part of the Sefuri Mountains, on the western edge of the Sawara Plain. It is thought to have been a key transportation point, located between the current Itoshima area, which is presumed to be the location of the ancient kingdom of Itokoku, and the area around present-day Kasuga which is presumed to be the location of ancient kingdom of Nakoku, which are mentioned in ancient Chinese texts, such as the Wajinden.

The site was discovered by high school students during the construction of the Nokatadai housing complex in 1973, and an archaeological excavation was carried out from August of the same year. The remains include a large oval ring moat with a long axis of about 100 meters, enclosing a smaller rectangular moat measuring about 25 to 30 meters on each side. The large ring moat had about ten pit dwellings built inside, and the smaller moat, with an entrance and exit on the east side appeared to contain raised-floor warehouses to store grain, etc. Yayoi pottery, stone tools, iron tools, shellfish, fish bones, and animal bones have been unearthed. In the early part of the Kofun period, the large and small ring moats seemed to have been filled in, but at least 94 pit dwellings were built and a large village which extended beyond the site of the moats existed. At the outskirts of the village, there were cemeteries with three jar burial graves, one earthen pit grave, and one wooden coffin grave, and ten stone box-style sarcophagus graves. If unexplored parts are included, the number of remains is expected to be several times that number. Grave goods from these Kofun period burials included Chinese-made beast-belt bronze mirrors, mirrors with inner flower patterns, iron swords, cylindrical beads, and glass beads have been unearthed as grave goods from this period.

After the excavation was completed in 1989, the site was backfilled, and preserved as Nokata Central Park. In addition to the restoration of a portion of the ring moat, the Nokata Ruins Dwelling Ruins Exhibition Hall (野方遺跡住居跡展示館) was constructed to display building ruins and some of the excavated artifacts. In addition, two restorations of pit buildings were constructed in the park, but were destroyed in a suspicious fire in May 1994 and have not been rebuilt.

The site is approximately a 3.3 kilometers south of Shimoyamato Station on the JR Kyushu Chikuhi Line.

== See also ==
- List of Historic Sites of Japan (Fukuoka)
