= Ankokuji Jar Burial Cluster =

National Historic Site in Kurume, Fukuoka Prefecture Japan

Ankokuji Burial Jar Cluster
- 安国寺甕棺墓群 (Japanese)
- Ankokuji Burial Jar Cluster' Ankokuji Jar Burial Cluster (Japan)
- 33°19′22″N 130°33′39″E
- Type: Cemetery
- Periods: Yayoi period
- Location: Kurume, Fukuoka, Japan
- Region: Kyushu

History
- Built: c.1st century

Site notes
- Public access: Yes (no facilities)
- National Historic Site of Japan

The Ankokuji Burial Jar Cluster (安国寺甕棺墓群, Ankokuji kamekan bogun) is a Yayoi period cemetery, located in the Yamakawajindai neighborhood of the city of Kurume, Fukuoka Prefecture Japan. It was designated a National Historic Site of Japan in 1972.

== Overview ==
The Ankokuji Burial Jar Cluster is located on the south bank of the Chikugo River, approximately 2 kilometers north of Mount Kora, in an area where the Chikugo River, which flows through the Chikugo Plain, passes the foot of Mt. Kora and changes its flow from west to south. The necropolis was discovered in 1978 during an urban planning project. The site is spread out in an almost oval shape, measuring approximately 60 meters from east-to-west and 90 meters from north-to-south. The remains found in the archaeological excavation area include 111 jar burial graves, 4 earthen pit graves, 4 pits, and 17 ritual sites. Other than the two stone-covered jar tombs from the middle of the Yayoi period, all of the jar tombs are double-sided jar coffins.The ritual remains are an earthen pit containing a large amount of red-painted Yayoi pottery was discarded. Since no burial goods were found in the tombs, no difference in social status could be recognized. It is estimated that there are probably around 300 graves in total in this site, which is important for understanding the tomb system of the Yayoi period. The excavated items are on display at the Kurume City Cultural Properties Museum. The site is approximately 15 minutes by car from Nishitetsu Kurume Station on the Nishitetsu Tenjin Ōmuta Line.

The site is located within the grounds of the Rinzai school temple of Ankoku-ji, one of the 60 Ankoku-ji temples which were constructed in all provinces across Japan, in the 14th century by Ashikaga Takauji.

== See also ==
- List of Historic Sites of Japan (Fukuoka)
