= List of historic sites of Japan (Fukuoka Prefecture) =

This list is of the historic sites of Japan located within the Prefecture of Fukuoka.

== National Historic Sites ==
As of 27 January 2025, ninety-nine Sites have been designated as being of national significance (including five *Special Historic Sites); Kii Castle spans the prefectural borders with Saga and the Mitsui Miike Coal Mine Sites those with Kumamoto.

Site	Municipality	Comments	Image	Coordinates	Type	Ref.
*Ōzuka Kofun 王塚古墳 Ōzuka kofun	Keisen	Kofun period tumulus (decorated kofun)	Ōzuka Kofun	33°35′19″N 130°39′49″E	1	2631
*Mizuki Castle ruins 水城跡 Mizuki ato	Dazaifu, Ōnojō, Kasuga	Asuka period fortifications	Mizuki Site	33°31′09″N 130°27′09″E	2	2598
*Dazaifu Site 大宰府跡 Dazaifu ato	Dazaifu	Nara through Heian period administrative center of Kyushu	Dazaifu Site	33°30′53″N 130°30′55″E	2	2599
*Ōno Castle ruins 大野城跡 Ōno-jō ato	Dazaifu, Ōnojō, Umi	Asuka period fortifications	Ōno Castle Site	33°32′11″N 130°31′08″E	2, 3	2622
*Kii Castle ruins 基肄(椽)城跡 Kii-jō ato	Chikushino	Asuka period fortifications; its construction in 665 under Baekje guidance, as the castle of Woyogi (椽), is chronicled in Nihon Shoki; formed part of a network of defences dating to the immediate aftermath of the Battle of Hakusukinoe in 663 to protect Dazaifu against the threat of invasion from the Korean peninsula by Silla-Tang forces; the designation includes an area of Kiyama in Saga Prefecture	Kii Castle Site	33°26′36″N 130°30′45″E	2	3085
Ainoshima Stone Tumuli 相島積石塚群 Ainoshima tsumiishitsuka-gun	Shingū	Kofun period tumulus	Ainoshima Stone Tumuli	33°45′42″N 130°22′34″E	1	3297
Ae Kanga ruins 阿恵官衙遺跡 Ae kanga iseki	Kasuya	Nara period local government administrative center ruins		33°36′52″N 130°27′31″E	2	00004101
Asakura Sue Ware Kiln Sites 朝倉須恵器窯跡 Asakura sue-ki kama ato	Chikuzen	Kofun period kiln ruins, designation comprises the sites of the Koguma Kiln (小隈窯跡) and Yamaguma Kiln (山隈窯跡)		33°25′21″N 130°36′42″E	6	00004043
Ashikisan Castle ruins 阿志岐山城跡 Ashikisan-jō ato	Chikushino	Asuka period fortifications		33°29′42″N 130°33′55″E	2	00003719
Anagahayama Kofun 穴ヶ葉山古墳 Anagahayama kofun	Kōge	Kofun period tumulus	Anagahayama Kofun	33°33′47″N 131°10′08″E	1	2633
Ayazuka Kofun 綾塚古墳 Ayazuka kofun	Miyako	Kofun period tumulus	Ayazuka Kofun	33°42′18″N 130°54′59″E	1	2665
Ankokuji Jar Burial Cluster 安国寺甕棺墓群 Ankokuji kamekan bogun	Kurume	Yayoi period cemetery		33°19′22″N 130°33′39″E	1	2684
Antoku Ōzuka Kofun 安徳大塚古墳 Antoku Ōzuka kofun	Nakagawa	Kofun period tumulus		33°29′53″N 130°25′52″E	1	00003941
Urayama Kofun 浦山古墳 Urayama kofun	Kurume	Kofun period tumulus (decorated kofun)		33°17′06″N 130°32′09″E	1	2641
Yakata Kofun Cluster 屋形古墳群 Yakata kofun-gun	Ukiha	Kofun period tumuli cluster; designation includes Mezurashizuka Kofun (珍敷塚古墳), Toribunezuka Kofun (鳥船塚古墳), Furuhata Kofun (古畑古墳), and Haru Kofun (原古墳)		33°19′49″N 130°44′18″E	1	2643
Shimotakahashi Kanga ruins 下高橋官衙遺跡 Shimotakahashi kanga iseki	Tachiarai	Nara period local government administrative center ruins	Shimotakahashi Government Office Site	33°23′15″N 130°35′23″E	2	3225
Shimobaba Kofun 下馬場古墳 Shimobaba kofun	Kurume	Kofun period tumulus (decorated kofun)		33°18′50″N 130°37′22″E	1	2638
Kamatsuka Kofun 釜塚古墳 Kamatsuka kofun	Itoshima	Kofun period tumulus	Kamatsuka Kofun	33°32′37″N 130°10′40″E	1	2685
Kanzeon-ji Precinct 観世音寺境内及び子院跡附老司瓦窯跡 Kanzeonji keidai oyobi shiin ato tsuketari Rōji kawara gama ato	Dazaifu	Nara period kiln ruins, designation includes the Rōji tile kiln site	Kanzeonji Precinct	33°31′50″N 130°25′25″E	3	2660
Yoshitaketakagi Site 吉武高木遺跡 Yoshitaketakagi iseki	Fukuoka (Nishi-ku))	Yayoi period settlement traces	Yoshitaketakagi Site	33°32′16″N 130°19′09″E	1	2690
Tachibanazuka Kofun 橘塚古墳 Tachibanazuka kofun	Miyako	Kofun period tumulus	Tachibanazuka Kofun	33°42′15″N 130°55′20″E	1	2658
Mount Kubote 求菩提山 Kubote-san	Buzen, Chikujō	Holy mountain	Mount Kubote	33°32′25″N 131°00′42″E	3	3306
Ushikubi Sue Ware Kiln Site 牛頸須恵器窯跡 Ushikubi Sue-ki kama ato	Ōnojō	Nara period kiln ruins	Ushikubi Sue Ware Kiln Site	33°30′52″N 130°28′40″E	6	00003624
Kanenokuma Site 金隈遺跡 Kanenokuma iseki	Fukuoka (Hakata-ku)	Yayoi period settlement trace	Kanenokuma Site	33°33′44″N 130°28′20″E	1	2663
Genkō Bōrui 元寇防塁 Genkō bōrui	Fukuoka (Nishi-ku to Higashi-ku	Kamakura period fortification	Genkō Bōrui	33°35′08″N 130°18′30″E	2, 9	2619
Furutsuki Cave Tombs 古月横穴 Furutsuki yokoana	Kurate	Kofun period necropolis	Furutsuki Cave Tombs	33°48′14″N 130°40′09″E	1	2623
Gorōyama Kofun 五郎山古墳 Gorōyama kofun	Chikushino	Kofun period tumulus( decorated kofun)	Gorōyama Kofun	33°27′07″N 130°32′43″E	1	2640
Goshogotani Kōgoishi 御所ヶ谷神籠石 Goshogotani kōgoishi	Yukuhashi, Miyako	Asuka period fortifications	Goshogotani Kōgoishi	33°40′27″N 130°55′50″E	1	2646
Goshoyama Kofun 御所山古墳 Goshoyama kofun	Kanda	Kofun period tumulus		33°45′31″N 130°58′50″E	1	2630
Ontsuka - Gongenzuka Kofun 御塚・権現塚古墳 Ontsuka・Gongenzuka kofun	Kurume	Kofun period tumuli		33°16′48″N 130°28′40″E	1	2620
Kōshōji Kofun 光正寺古墳 Kōshōji kofun	Umi	Kofun period tumulus	Kōshōji Kofun	33°34′40″N 130°30′00″E	1	2669
Takayama Hikokurō Grave 高山彦九郎墓 Takayama Hikokurō no haka	Kurume	Edo Period political agitator grave located in the precinct of Henshōin (遍照院)	Takayama Hikokurō Grave	33°19′10″N 130°31′12″E	7	2637
Kōra-san Kōgoishi 高良山神籠石 Kōra-san kōgoishi	Kurume	Asuka period fortifications	Kōra-san Kōgoishi	33°18′12″N 130°33′44″E	1	2645
Kōrokan Site 鴻臚館跡 Kōrokan ato	Fukuoka (Hakata-ku)	Asuka to Heian period guest house for diplomats	Kōrokan Site	33°35′09″N 130°23′09″E	2	3407
Kokubu Tile Kiln ruins 国分瓦窯跡 Kokubu kawara gama ato	Dazaifu	Nara period tile kiln ruins	Kokubu Tile Kiln ruins	33°31′17″N 130°30′33″E	6	2606
Imayama Site 今山遺跡 Imayama iseki	Fukuoka (Nishi-ku)	Yayoi period settlement trace		33°35′22″N 130°15′46″E	6	2691
Imajuku Kofun Cluster 今宿古墳群 Imajuku kofun-gun	Fukuoka (Nishi-ku)	Kofun period tumulicluster; designation includes Marukumayama Kofun (丸隈山古墳), Ōtsuka Kofun (大塚古墳), Sukisaki Kofun (鋤崎古墳), Iiji Futatsuka Kofun (飯氏二塚古墳), Kabutozuka Kofun (兜塚古墳) (pictured), Yamanohana No.1 Kofun (山ノ鼻一号墳), and Waka Hachimangū Kofun (若八幡宮古墳)	Imajuku Kofun Cluster	33°33′54″N 130°14′46″E	1	2614
Sakurakyō Kofun 桜京古墳 Sakurakyō kofun	Munakata	Kofun period tumulus (decorated kofun); submitted for inscription on the UNESCO World Heritage List as a component of Okinoshima Island and Related Sites in Munakata Region	Sakurakyō Kofun	33°50′38″N 130°29′43″E	1	2674
Shito Dolmen Cluster 志登支石墓群 Shito shiseki bo-gun	Itoshima	Yayoi period necropolis	Shito Dolmen Cluster	33°34′10″N 130°13′04″E	1	2647
Kagenouma Kōgoishi 鹿毛馬神籠石 Kagenouma kōgoishi	Iizuka	Asuka period fortifications	Kagenouma Kōgoishi	33°40′41″N 130°44′10″E	1	2639
Tanabata-ike Kofun 七夕池古墳 Tanabata-ike kofun	Shime	Kofun period tumulus	Tanabata-ike Kofun	33°34′40″N 130°30′00″E	1	2670
Mount Shura Site 首羅山遺跡 Shura-san iseki	Hisayama	Kamakura period settlement trace	Mount Shura Site	33°39′27″N 130°30′47″E	3	00003785
Munakata Taisha Precinct 宗像神社境内 Munakata Jinja keidai	Munakata	Noted Shinto shrine; submitted for inscription on the UNESCO World Heritage List as a component of Okinoshima Island and Related Sites in Munakata Region	Munakata Taisha Precinct	33°53′51″N 130°25′55″E	3	2661
Zoyama Kōgoishi 女山神籠石 Zoyama kōgoishi	Miyama	Asuka period fortifications	Zoyama Kōgoishi	33°09′44″N 130°30′56″E	1	2644
Ogōri Kanga ruins 小郡官衙遺跡群 Ogōri kanga iseki-gun	Ogōri	Nara period local government administrative center ruins; designation includes the Ogōri Kanga ruins (小郡官衙遺跡) and the Kamiiwata Site (上岩田遺跡)	Ogōri Government Office Sites	33°24′05″N 130°33′24″E	2	2662
Oda Chausutsuka Kofun 小田茶臼塚古墳 Oda Chausutsuka kofun	Asakura	Kofun period tumulus		33°23′18″N 130°39′53″E	1	2683
Yakenotōge Kofun 焼ノ峠古墳 Yakenotōge kofun	Chikuzen	Kofun period tumulus	Yakenotōge Kofun	33°25′36″N 130°35′55″E	1	2668
Shinmachi Dolmen Cluster 新町支石墓群 Shinmachi shiseki bo-gun	Itoshima	Yayoi period cemetery		33°34′12″N 130°08′01″E	1	3264
Suguokamoto Site 須玖岡本遺跡 Suguokamoto iseki	Kasuga	Yayoi period settlement trace	Suguokamoto Site	33°32′19″N 130°26′59″E	1	2688
Shōfuku-ji Precinct 聖福寺境内 Shōfukuji keidai	Fukuoka (Hakata-ku)	Noted Zen Buddhist temple founded in the Kamakura period	Shōfukuji Precinct	33°35′51″N 130°24′53″E	3	2657
Sekijinsan Kofun 石神山古墳 Sekijinsan kofun	Miyama	Kofun period tumulus with stone warrior		33°05′39″N 130°28′46″E	1	2672
Ishizukayama Kofun 石塚山古墳 Ishizukayama kofun	Kanda	Kofun period tumulus		33°46′31″N 130°58′48″E	1	2687
Sendō Kofun 仙道古墳 Sendō kofun	Chikuzen	Kofun period tumulus	Sendō Kofun	33°26′27″N 130°38′25″E	1	2679
Kugurizuka Kofun 潜塚古墳 Kugurizuka kofun	Ōmuta	Kofun period tumulus		33°00′58″N 130°27′04″E	1	2677
Funasako Kiln ruins 船迫窯跡 Funasako kama ato	Chikujō	Nara period kiln ruins	Funasako Kiln Site	33°39′35″N 130°59′57″E	6	3227
Sone Sites 曽根遺跡群 Sone iseki-gun	Itoshima	designation includes Hirabaru Site (平原遺跡), Warezuka Kofun (ワレ塚古墳), Zenigamezuka Kofun (銭瓶塚古墳), and Kitsunezuka Kofun (狐塚古墳)	Sone Sites	33°32′32″N 130°13′43″E	1	2686
Dainose Kanga ruins 大ノ瀬官衙遺跡 Dainose Kanga iseki	Kōge	Nara period local government administrative center ruins		33°35′15″N 131°09′12″E	2	3226
Dazaifu Gakkōin Site 大宰府学校院跡 Dazaifu Gakkōin ato	Dazaifu	Nara-Heian period university ruins	Dazaifu Gakkōin Site	33°30′53″N 130°31′08″E	4	2659
Daibu temple pagoda ruins 大分廃寺塔跡 Daibu Haiji tō ato	Iizuka	Asuka period temple ruins		33°35′05″N 130°38′09″E	3	2636
Takehara Kofun 竹原古墳 Takehara kofun	Miyawaka	decorated kofun	Takehara Kofun	33°43′59″N 130°36′38″E	1	2648
Chikugo Kokufu Site 筑後国府跡 Chikugo Kokufu ato	Kurume	Nara period kokufu of Chikugo Province	Chikugo Kokufu Site	33°18′29″N 130°32′35″E	2	2693
Chikuzen Kokubun-ji Site 筑前国分寺跡 Chikuzen Kokubunji ato	Dazaifu	Nara period provincial temple of Chikuzen Province	Chikuzen Kokubunji Site	33°18′49″N 130°32′30″E	3	2605
Chōshizuka Kofun 銚子塚古墳 Chōshizuka kofun	Itoshima	Kofun period tumulus	Chōshizuka Kofun	33°32′12″N 130°10′11″E	1	2651
Tsuyazaki Kofun Cluster 津屋崎古墳群 Tsuyazaki kofun-gun	Fukutsu	Kofun period tumuli cluster	Tsuyazaki Kofun Cluster	33°50′29″N 130°29′16″E	1	3422
Tsukahanazuka Kofun 塚花塚古墳 Tsukahanazuka kofun	Ukiha	decorated kofun	Tsukahanazuka Kofun	33°19′44″N 130°47′55″E	1	2608
Taguma Ishihatake Site 田熊石畑遺跡 Taguma Ishihatake iseki	Munakata	Yayoi period settlement traces		33°48′02″N 130°32′14″E	1	00003662
Tanushimaru Kofun Cluster 田主丸古墳群 Tanushimaru kofun-gun	Kurume	Kofun period tumuli cluster; designation includes Tanushimaru Ōtsuka Kofun (田主丸大塚古墳), Jitoku Kofun (寺徳古墳), Nakabaru Kitsunezuka Kofun (中原狐塚古墳), and Nishinotate Kofun (西館古墳)		33°19′32″N 130°42′42″E	1	2656
Tōbarusan Castle ruins 唐原山城跡 Tōbarusan-jō ato	Kōge	Asuka period fortifications		33°33′57″N 131°09′38″E	2	3423
Tōnobaru pagoda ruins 塔原塔跡 Tōnobaru tō ato	Chikushino	Asuka period temple ruins		33°29′43″N 130°30′30″E	3	2634
Kusumyō-Shigesada Kofun 楠名・重定古墳 Kusumyō・Shigesada kofun	Ukiha	Kofun period tumuli	Kusumyō-Shigesada Kofun	33°19′57″N 130°47′40″E	1	2601
Hinooka Kofun 日岡古墳 Hinooka kofun	Ukiha	Kofun period tumulus (decorated kofun)	Hinooka Kofun	33°20′40″N 130°46′02″E	1	2615
Hihaizuka Kofun 日拝塚古墳 Hihaizuka kofun	Kasuga	Kofun period tumulus	Hihaizuka Kofun	33°31′23″N 130°26′19″E	1	2673
Nichirinji Kofun 日輪寺古墳 Nichirinji kofun	Kurume	Kofun period tumulus (decorated kofun)	Nichirinji Kofun	33°19′14″N 130°29′54″E	1	2600
Hagi Kōgoishi 杷木神籠石 Hagi kōgoishi	Asakura	Asuka period fortifications	Hagi Kōgoishi	33°21′26″N 130°49′43″E	1	2664
Haginoo Kofun 萩ノ尾古墳 Haginoo kofun	Ōmuta	Kofun period tumulus (decorated kofun)	Haginoo Kofun	33°00′11″N 130°28′15″E	1	2652
Yame Kofun Cluster 八女古墳群 Yame kofun-gun	Yame, Hirokawa, Chikugo	Kofun period tumuli cluster; designation includes Noriba Kofun (乗場古墳), Sekijinsan Kofun (石人山古墳), Iwatoyama Kofun (岩戸山古墳), Zenzōzuka Kofun (善蔵塚古墳), Kōgadani Kofun (弘化谷古墳), Maruyamazuka Kofun (丸山塚古墳), Maruyama Kofun (丸山古墳), and Chausuzuka Kofun (茶臼塚古墳)	Yame Kofun Cluster	33°13′58″N 130°34′09″E	1	2678
Itazuke Site 板付遺跡 Itazuke iseki	Fukuoka (Hakata-ku)	Jomon to Yayoi period settlement traces	Itazuke Site	33°33′56″N 130°27′10″E	1	2675
Hie Site 比恵遺跡 Hie iseki	Fukuoka (Hakata-ku)	Yayoi to Muromachi period settlement traces		33°34′41″N 130°25′35″E	1	3304
Fukuoka Castle Site 福岡城跡 Fukuoka-jō ato	Fukuoka (Chūō-ku)	Edo period castle	Fukuoka Castle Site	33°35′03″N 130°22′58″E	2	2650
Hiratsuka Kawazoe Site 平塚川添遺跡 Hiratsuka Kawazoe iseki	Asakura	Yayoi period settlement trace	Hiratsuka Kawazoe Site	33°23′40″N 130°39′04″E	1	2692
Buzen Kokubun-ji ruins 豊前国分寺跡 Buzen Kokubunji ato	Miyako	Nara period provincial temple of Buzen Province	Buzen Kokubunji Site	33°40′45″N 130°58′50″E	3	2676
Horikawa Canal and Asakura Water Wheels 堀川用水及び朝倉揚水車 Horikawa yōsui oyobi Asakura yōsuisha	Asakura	Edo Period civil engineering project	Horikawa Canal and Asakura Water Wheels	33°22′06″N 130°44′55″E	6	2689
Nokata Site 野方遺跡 Nokata iseki	Fukuoka (Nishi-ku)	Yayoi to Kofun period settlement traces	Nokata Site	33°33′19″N 130°18′22″E	1	2671
Tomoeda Tile Kiln Site 友枝瓦窯跡 Tomoeda kawara gama ato	Kōge	Nara period kiln ruins		33°33′59″N 131°08′43″E	6	2607
Raizan Kōgoishi 雷山神籠石 Raizan kōgoishi	Itoshima	Asuka period fortifications	Raizan Kōgoishi	33°30′00″N 130°13′06″E	1	2621
Rōji Kofun 老司古墳 Rōji kofun	Fukuoka (Minami-ku)	Kofun period tumulus		33°31′49″N 130°25′12″E	1	3272
Ito Castle ruins 怡土城跡 Ito-jō ato	Itoshima	Asuka period fortifications	Ito Castle Site	33°32′53″N 130°16′07″E	2	2632
Mitsui Miike Coal Mine Sites 三井三池炭鉱跡 Mitsui Miike tankō ato	Ōmuta	inscribed on the UNESCO World Heritage List as one of the Sites of Japan’s Meiji Industrial Revolution: Iron and Steel, Shipbuilding and Coal Mining; designation includes the sites of Miyahara Pit (宮原坑跡) and Manda Pit (万田坑跡) and an area of Arao in Kumamoto Prefecture	Mitsui Miike Coal Mine Sites	33°00′49″N 130°27′22″E	6	3311
Mount Hōman 宝満山 Hōman-zan	Dazaifu, Chikushino	Holy mountain	Mount Hōman	33°32′08″N 130°34′05″E	3	00003822
Jōyama Cave Tomb Cluster 城山横穴群 Jōyama yokoana-gun	Fukuchi	Kofun period corridor-type kofun cluster		33°40′44″N 130°46′48″E	1	00003863
Funabaru Kofun 船原古墳 Funabaru kofun	Koga	Kofun period tumulus	Funabaru Kofun	33°42′53″N 130°30′09″E	1	00003954
Mount Hiko 英彦山 Hiko-san	Soeda	Holy mountain	Mount Hiko	33°28′37″N 130°55′06″E	3	00003970
Fukubaru Chōjabaru Kanga ruins 福原長者原官衙遺跡 Fukubaru Chōjabaru kanga iseki	Yukuhashi	Nara period local government administrative center ruins		33°43′43″N 130°58′58″E	2	00003997
Mikumo-Iwara Site 三雲・井原遺跡 Mikumo・Iwara iseki	Itoshima	Yayoi period settlement traces	Mikumo-Iwara Site	33°33′26″N 130°11′44″E	1	00003998
Chikuhō coalfield sites 筑豊炭田遺跡群 Chikuhō tanden iseki-gun	Iizuka, Nōgata, Tagawa	Meiji period industrials sites; designation comprises the sites of the Mitsui Tagawa Mine Ita Pit (三井田川鉱業所伊田坑跡), Shakanoo Pit (目尾炭坑跡), and Former Chikuhō Coal Mining Association Nōgata Meeting Hall and First-Aid Practice Pit (旧筑豊石炭鉱業組合直方会議所及び救護練習所模擬坑道)	Chikuhō coalfield sites	33°38′30″N 130°48′50″E	6	00004044
Antokudai Site 安徳台遺跡 Antokudai iseki	Nakagawa	Yayoi period settlement traces		33°36′52″N 130°27′31″E	1	00004063
Arima clan cemetery 久留米藩主有馬家墓所 Kurume-han-shu Arima-ke bosho	Kurume	Edo Period daimyo cemetery in Bairin-ji	Arima Clan Cemetery	33°19′26″N 130°29′58″E	7	00004119
Hakata Site 博多遺跡 Hakata iseki	Fukuoka (Hakata-ku)	Heian period port traces		33°35′37″N 130°24′36″E	1	00004192
Maehata Site 前畑遺跡 Maehata iseki	Chikushino)	Asuka-Nara period fortification traces		33°27′31″N 130°33′10″E	1	00004219

== Prefectural Historic Sites ==
As of 1 May 2024, eighty-four Sites have been designated as being of prefectural importance.

Site	Municipality	Comments	Image	Coordinates	Type	Ref.
Songakuma Kofun 損ヶ熊古墳; Songakuma kofun	Miyawaka			33°43′44″N 130°38′16″E		
Fukuju-ji 広寿山福聚寺; Kōjusan Fukujuji	Kitakyūshū			33°52′13″N 130°54′10″E		
Ainoshima Watch Tower Banner Supports 藍島遠見番所旗柱台; Ainoshima tōmi bansho hata bashiradai	Kitakyūshū			33°59′37″N 130°48′53″E		
Shigetome Site 重留遺跡; Shigetome iseki	Kitakyūshū			33°51′12″N 130°53′11″E		
Motookaurio Shell Mound 元岡瓜尾貝塚; Motookaurio kaizuka	Fukuoka			33°35′41″N 130°13′31″E		
Hie Circular Dwelling Site 比恵環溝住居遺跡; Hie kankō jūkyo iseki	Fukuoka			33°34′49″N 130°25′49″E		
Miyazaki Yasuda Grave and Study 宮崎安貞墓附宮崎安貞書斎一棟; Miyazaki Yasuda haka tsuketari Miyazaki Yasuda shosai ittō	Fukuoka			33°34′18″N 130°15′50″E		
Kamei Family Graves 亀井（南冥、昭陽）家の墓; Kamei (Nanmei, Shōyō) -ke no haka	Fukuoka	in the precinct of Jōmanji (浄満寺)		33°35′13″N 130°21′49″E		
Karenozuka 枯野塚附哺川墓、句碑、寄附碑; Karenozuka tsuketari Hosen-no-haka, kuhi, kifu-hi	Fukuoka	celebrating Matsuo Bashō		33°36′43″N 130°25′17″E		
Gionyama Kofun 祇園山古墳; Gionyama kofun	Kurume			33°18′12″N 130°33′16″E		
Maehata Kofun 前畑古墳; Maehata kofun	Kurume			33°19′01″N 130°37′59″E		
Hosshin Castle Site 発心城跡; Hosshin-jō ato	Kurume			33°17′42″N 130°39′03″E		
Andō Seian Grave 安東省庵墓; Andō Seian no haka	Yanagawa	in the precinct of Jōkeji (浄華寺)		33°10′05″N 130°24′46″E		
Kurume Castle Site 久留米城跡; Kurume-jō ato	Kurume			33°19′42″N 130°30′28″E		
Banzuka Kofun 番塚古墳; Banzuka kofun	Kanda			33°45′44″N 130°58′48″E		
Kitahara Hakushū Residence 北原白秋生家; Kitahara Hakushū seika	Yanagawa			33°09′32″N 130°23′39″E		
Ikata Kofun 伊方古墳; Ikata kofun	Fukuchi			33°40′55″N 130°47′45″E		
Mizumachi Sites 水町遺跡群; Mizumachi iseki-gun	Nōgata			33°43′23″N 130°45′42″E		
Kawashima Kofun 川島古墳; Kawashima kofun	Iizuka			33°39′39″N 130°41′32″E		
Sesudono Kofun セスドノ古墳; Sesudono kofun	Tagawa			33°39′03″N 130°49′31″E		
Akizuki Castle Site 秋月城跡; Akizuki Castle Site	Asakura			33°27′56″N 130°41′44″E		
Dōnanzan Kofun 童男山古墳; Dōnanzan kofun	Yame			33°13′32″N 130°36′45″E		
Sanshika (Maki Yasuomi Residence) 山梔窩（真木和泉守謫居地） Sanshika (Maki Izumi no kami chikkyochi)	Chikugo			33°11′49″N 130°29′05″E		
Biwanokuma Kofun ビワノクマ古墳; Biwanokuma kofun	Yukuhashi			33°43′55″N 130°56′36″E		
Butsuzan School Site (Suisan-en) 仏山塾（水哉園）跡; Butsuzan-juku (Suisan-en) ato	Yukuhashi			33°41′50″N 130°56′11″E		
Kurobe Kofun Cluster 黒部古墳群; Kurobe kofun-gun	Buzen			33°37′07″N 131°05′38″E		
Zōshun-en (Tsunetō School Site) 蔵春園（恒遠塾跡） Zōshun-en (Tsunetō-juku ato)	Buzen			33°34′29″N 131°07′23″E		
Habu Rakan Cave Tombs 垣生羅漢百穴; Habu Rakan hyakuketsu	Nakama			33°48′57″N 130°41′56″E		
Nakama Karato Sluice Gate 中間唐戸の水門; Nakama Karato no suimon	Nakama			33°48′48″N 130°42′29″E		
Mitsusawa Site 三沢遺跡; Mitsusawa iseki	Ogōri			33°26′16″N 130°33′38″E		
Buzō-ji Site 武蔵寺跡; Buzōji ato	Chikushino			33°29′22″N 130°30′28″E		
Miyanomoto Site 宮ノ本遺跡; Miyanomoto iseki	Dazaifu			33°30′18″N 130°29′30″E		
Yokodake Sōfuku-ji Site 横岳崇福寺跡; Yokodake Sōfukuji ato	Dazaifu			33°31′12″N 130°31′29″E		
Fukuoka Domain Porcelain Kilns 福岡藩磁器御用窯跡; Fukuoka-han-jiki goyō kama ato	Sue			33°35′31″N 130°31′34″E		
Baigaku-ji 梅岳寺; Baigakuji	Shingū			33°41′13″N 130°28′18″E		
Ōkuma Sarcophagus 大隈石棺; Ōkuma sekkan	Kasuya			33°37′26″N 130°29′30″E		
Yamaga Shell Mound 山鹿貝塚; Yamaga kaizuka	Ashiya			33°54′22″N 130°39′56″E		
Yoroizuka Kofun Cluster 鎧塚古墳群; Yoroizuka kofun	Kurate			33°47′23″N 130°39′50″E		
Ninobu Ōtsuka Kofun 新延大塚古墳; Ninobu Ōtsuka kofun	Kurate			33°47′11″N 130°39′39″E		
Furumon Kiln Site 古門窯跡; Furumon kama ato	Kurate			33°48′48″N 130°39′30″E		
Hase-dera Cremation Tombs 長谷寺火葬墓群; Hasedera kasō bogun	Kurate			33°45′32″N 130°40′32″E		
Ōgi-Yahata Kofun 扇八幡古墳; Ōgi-Yahata kofun	Miyako			33°41′51″N 130°54′14″E		
Bodai Haiji Site 菩提廃寺跡; Bodai Haiji ato	Miyako			33°40′57″N 130°53′24″E		
Itō Tsunetari Residence 伊藤常足旧宅; Itō Tsunetari kyūtaku	Kurate			33°48′37″N 130°39′32″E		
Okide Kofun 沖出古墳; Okide kofun	Kama			33°34′48″N 130°43′18″E		
Kamatabaru Yayoi Tomb Cluster 鎌田原弥生墳墓群; Kamatabaru Yayoi funbo-gun	Kama			33°31′31″N 130°45′16″E		
Obasanishi Kofun 小正西古墳; Obasanishi kofun	Iizuka			33°37′27″N 130°39′30″E		
Kitsunezuka Kofun 狐塚古墳; Kitsunezuka kofun	Asakura	decorated kofun		33°23′17″N 130°42′46″E		
Chōan-ji Site 長安寺跡; Chōanji ato	Asakura			33°23′38″N 130°44′13″E		
Kendoku Kabutozuka Kofun 彦徳甲塚古墳; Kendoku Kabutozuka kofun	Miyako			33°41′04″N 130°58′13″E		
Kamisaka Haiji Site 上坂廃寺跡; Kamisaka Haiji ato	Miyako			33°40′14″N 130°58′33″E		
Koishihara-mura Old Kiln Sites 小石原村窯跡群 釜床一号窯跡 一基 一本杉二号窯跡 一基; Koishihara-mura kama ato gun	Tōhō	designation includes the Kamata No.1 Kiln and Ipponsugi No.2 Kiln		33°27′53″N 130°49′51″E		
Moribe Hirahara Kofun Cluster 森部平原古墳群; Moribe Hirahara kofun-gun	Kurume			33°19′08″N 130°42′57″E		
Nekoo Castle Site 猫尾城跡; Nekoo-jō ato	Yame			33°12′49″N 130°41′01″E		
Former Kurume Domain Tenryō Hita Boundary Stones 旧久留米藩・天領日田国境石 kyū-Kurume-han Tenryō Hita kunizakai-ishi	Yame			33°22′43″N 130°52′50″E		
Kanakuri Site 金栗遺跡; Kanakuri iseki	Miyama			33°09′00″N 130°28′34″E		
Shinkai-mura Old Stele 新開村旧てい記碑; Shinkai-mura kyū tei-ki-hi	Miyama	celebrating the construction of the Kurosaki embankment (黒崎堤防)		33°06′04″N 130°26′08″E		
Seishiden Site 清祀殿跡; Seishiden ato	Kawara			33°42′45″N 130°50′59″E		
Hōjō Iwaya Sanskrit Cliff Mandala 方城岩屋磨崖梵字曼荼羅; Hōjō Iwaya magai bonji mandara	Fukuchi			33°41′23″N 130°47′36″E		
Yamae-juku West Gate and Earthen Wall 山家宿西構口並びに土塀; Yamae-juku nishi-kamaeguchi narabini dobei	Chikushino			33°28′45″N 130°34′24″E		
Buzenbō Kofun Cluster and Sutra Mounds 豊前坊古墳群・経塚; Buzenbō kofun-gun・kyōzuka	Onga			33°50′06″N 130°39′23″E		
Tsutsumi Tōshōji Kofun 堤当正寺古墳; Tsutsumi Tōshōji kofun	Asakura			33°25′20″N 130°40′21″E		
Shōbaru Site 庄原遺跡; Shōbaru iseki	Soeda			33°34′22″N 130°50′15″E		
Kurosaki Kanzeonzuka Kofun and Sutra Mounds 黒崎観世音塚古墳・経塚; Kurosaki Kanzeonzuka kofun・kyōzuka	Ōmuta			33°04′27″N 130°25′49″E		
Matsuo Castle Site 松尾城跡; Matsuo-jō ato	Tōhō			33°27′53″N 130°49′32″E		
Former Yanagawa Domain Land Reclamation Site 旧柳河藩干拓遺跡 黒崎堤防 永治堤防 矩手水門 附水門新築碑 kyū-Yanagawa-han kantaku iseki	Miyama	designation includes the Kurosaki embankment, Eiji embankment, Kanete sluice gate, and related stele		33°05′57″N 130°26′35″E		
Buzen Kokufu Site 豊前国府跡; Buzen kokufu ato	Miyako	kokufu of Buzen Province		33°41′12″N 130°59′03″E		
Ichinoue East Residence Site 市ノ上東屋敷遺跡; Ichinoue higashi yashiki iseki	Kurume			33°19′03″N 130°31′57″E		
Utoguchi Tile Kiln Site ウトグチ瓦窯跡; Utoguchi kawara gama ato	Kasuga			33°30′52″N 130°26′40″E		
Hanatateyama Anakannon Kofun 花立山穴観音古墳; Hanatateyama Anakannon kofun	Ogōri			33°25′14″N 130°35′17″E		
Sone Kofun Cluster 曽根古墳群; Sone kofun-gun	Kitakyūshū			33°49′08″N 130°56′14″E		
Nariaijitani Kofun 成合寺谷古墳; Nariaijitani kofun	Miyama			33°08′55″N 130°30′49″E		
Shime Coal Mine Site 志免鉱業所跡; Shime kōgyōsho ato	Shime			33°35′25″N 130°29′11″E		
Shikabe-Tabuchi Site 鹿部田渕遺跡; Shikabe Tabuchi iseki	Koga			33°43′21″N 130°27′44″E		
Jirobō Tarobō Rock Buddhas 次郎坊太郎坊磨崖仏群; Jirobō Tarobō magai-Butsu-gun	Tōhō			33°22′44″N 130°52′42″E		
Jōno Site 城野遺跡; Jōno iseki	Kitakyūshū			33°51′21″N 130°53′10″E		
Ōkuma Castle Site (Masutomi Castle Site) 大隈城跡(益富城跡); Ōkuma-jō ato (Masutomi-jō ato)	Kama			33°32′47″N 130°45′08″E		
Tsuiki Naval Airbase Inado Bunker 海軍築城航空基地稲童掩体; Kaigun Tsuiki kōkū-kichi Inadō-entai	Yukuhashi			33°41′37″N 131°01′49″E		

== Municipal Historic Sites ==
As of 1 May 2024, a further two hundred and twenty-one Sites have been designated as being of municipal importance.

== See also ==
- Cultural Properties of Japan
- Chikugo Province
- Chikuzen Province
- Buzen Province
- List of Places of Scenic Beauty of Japan (Fukuoka)
- List of Cultural Properties of Japan - paintings (Fukuoka)
- Kyushu National Museum
- Kyushu Historical Museum
