= Tōnobaru pagoda ruins =

Archaeological site in Chikushino, Japan

- 塔原塔跡 (Japanese)
- Tōnobaru pagoda ruins Tōnobaru pagoda ruins (Japan)
- Interactive map of Tōnobaru pagoda ruins
- 33°29′43″N 130°30′30″E
- Type: temple ruins
- Periods: Asuka period
- Location: Chikushino, Fukuoka, Japan
- Region: Kyushu

History
- Built: c.654 AD

Site notes
- Public access: Yes (no facilities)

Tōnobaru pagoda ruins (塔原塔跡, Tōnobaru tō ato) is an archaeological site with the ruins of an Asuka period Buddhist temple located in the city of Chikushino, Fukuoka Prefecture, Japan. It was designated as a National Historic Site in 1939.

== Overview ==
The Tōnobaru pagoda ruins are located near the Tōnobaru intersection on Fukuoka Prefectural Route 31. It consists of a granite stone, approximately 1.8 meters on each side and approximately 60 centimeters thick, which has is a circular tenon in the center with a diameter of 98 and a depth of 11 centimeters. In the center there is a two-tier small rectangular hole in which a reliquary can be stored. This stone is the foundation for the central supporting pillar of a Japanese pagoda and is one of the oldest in Japan. The name and history of the temple are unknown, and it does not appear in any historical documentation. In an Edo period history of Chikuzen Province (Chikuzen no Kuni Zoku Fudoki), it is stated that this stone is the origin of the place name "Tōnobaru".

An Archaeological excavation in 1966 have unearthed roof tiles that are identical to tiles found at Yamada-dera in Asuka, Nara. Yamada-dera was associated with the Soga clan and was the personal temple of Soga no Ishikawamaro, so it is believed that this temple had an association with the Soga clan.In the biography of Prince Shotoku (Jōgu Shōtoku Hōō Teishō), it is stated that the prince ordered the construction of a temple called Hannya-ji in the Chikushino area in 654 AD to pray for the repose of the soul of Emperor Kōtoku, it as the date of the site corresponds, is it possible that this pagoda ruin was part of that temple.

About 500 meters northwest is the Sugituka temple ruins, with a few foundation stones remaining. Some of the excavated items are displayed at the Chikushino City History Museum. The site is approximately a 12-minute walk from Futsukaichi Station on the JR Kyushu Kagoshima Main Line.

== See also ==
- List of Historic Sites of Japan (Fukuoka)
