= Hakata Site =

Archaeological site in Fukuoka, Japan

- 博多遺跡 (Japanese)
- Hakata Site Hakata Site (Japan)
- 33°35′37.7″N 130°24′36.0″E
- Periods: Heian period
- Location: Hakata-ku, Fukuoka, Japan
- Region: Kyushu

Site notes
- Public access: Yes (no public facilities)

The Hakata Site (博多遺跡, Hakata Iseki) is an archaeological site with the traces of the late Heian period port of Hakata, located in what is now the Kamikawabata-cho neighborhood of Hakata-ku, Fukuoka, Japan. A portion of the ruins were designated a National Historic Site of Japan in 2024

== Overview ==
Hakata in northern Kyushu was a port settlement since prehistoric times and artifacts dating from the late 3rd century have been found. This area, close to the Asian continent, was historically a center for diplomacy and trade, beginning with the Japanese envoys to Sui and Tang China. It was also one of the key points of national defense, including Tsukushi Province and northern Kyushu, which were exposed to wars and invasions from the Korean Peninsula. It functioned as the port of Dazaifu until the Kamakura period, and was a target of the Mongol invasions of Japan. It flourished as the first autonomous city and commercial city in Japanese history, governed by a council of great merchants.

The Hakata Archaeological Site, a complex of ruins from the Yayoi period to ancient, medieval, early modern, modern and contemporary times, is located mainly in the northwest of JR Hakata Station. The earliest remains included Yayoi period jar burials, and the remains of a Nara period kanga, or government administrative complex, in addition to remains of a port facility. The site is located mainly in the sand dune area between the Naka River and the Mikasa River, and measures 1.6 kilometers north–south and 0.8 kilometers east–west, with Taihaku Street as its central axis. Archaeological excavations conducted prior to the construction of the Fukuoka City Subway Airport Line in 1977 revealed that the ancient remains and stratification of relic-containing layers were relatively well preserved. In addition to various artifacts, a large amount of imported ceramics have been excavated, providing archaeological evidence that Hakata was an international trading city. Among the ceramics (including those imported from China, Korea, and Southeast Asia, as well as those made in Japan), earthenware, woodenware, metal products, stone products, etc. excavated, and 2,138 items deemed to be of particular importance were collectively designated as a National Important Cultural Property in 2017.

In 2022, the remains of a stone wall (embankment) that is believed to be part of the port of Hakata in the late Heian period (late 11th century to early 12th century), discovered in connection with a redevelopment project at the site of the former Fukuoka Municipal Reizei Elementary School. The stonework was built on the banks of a back marsh formed at the mouth of the Naka River and Mikasa River, which merged into Hakata Bay during the late Heian period. Within the survey area, the remains were found between the shoreline from the 11th century and the edge of the sand dune, measuring 1.2-1.6 meters wide, approximately 60 centimeters high, and 70 meters north to south. Particles of sulfur, an important export item from Japan to Song dynasty China at that time, were found in the sediment layers around the remains. For these reasons, the revetment is considered to be part of the facilities built in Hakata Port, which developed as a commercial trading port after the decline of the Korokan, the base of Japan-Song government-based trade, in the late 11th century. It is may be related to the "Chikuzen Hakata Port Tōbo", a settlement of Chinese merchants in Hakata at that time.

== See also ==
- List of Historic Sites of Japan (Fukuoka)
