= Rōji Kofun =

Burial mound in southern Japan

- 老司古墳 (Japanese)
- Rōji Kofun Rōji Kofun (Japan)
- Interactive map of Rōji Kofun
- 33°31′49″N 130°25′12″E
- Type: Kofun
- Periods: Kofun period
- Location: Minami-ku, Fukuoka, Japan
- Region: Kyushu

History
- Built: c.5th century

Site notes
- Public access: No

The Rōji Kofun (老司古墳) is a Kofun period burial mound, located in Minami-ku, Fukuoka, Fukuoka Prefecture Japan. The tumulus was designated a National Historic Site of Japan in 2000.

== Overview ==
The Rōji Kofun is a zenpō-kōen-fun (前方後円墳), which is shaped like a keyhole, having one square end and one circular end, when viewed from above. It is situated on a hill at an elevation of approximately 40 meters on the west bank of the Naka River, orientated to the south. Archaeological excavations were carried out by Kyushu University and the Fukuoka Prefectural Board of Education from 1965 to 1969, and by the Fukuoka City Board of Education in 1987. The tumulus measures 76 meters in total length, with a 45-meter diameter posterior circular portion and 45-meter anterior rectangular width. The mound had fukiishi and cylindrical haniwa. Three stone burial chambers have been confirmed, with two in the posterior portion and one in the anterior portion. Burial chamber No. 1 in the center of the rear circle is the oldest, measuring 2.1 meters in length, 95-cm in width, and 80-cm in height.There is a corridor leading to the front part, and ten bronze mirrors including a triangular-rimmed divine beast mirror, were found as grave goods. From these artifacts, it estimated that the tumulus was built around the beginning of the 5th century. Other grave goods included cylindrical beads and magatama, weapons such as iron swords and iron arrowheads, short armor, horse harnesses, and tools. From the human bones surviving inside the burial chamber, it is known that multiple adult men and women were buried there.

The tumulus is located on the grounds of Fukuoka Juvenile Detention Center and is normally not accessible to the public.

== See also ==
- List of Historic Sites of Japan (Fukuoka)
