= Asakura Sue Ware Kiln Sites =

Asakura Sue Kiln Sites
- 朝倉須恵器窯跡 (Japanese)
- Asakura Sue Kiln Sites Asakura Sue Ware Kiln Sites (Japan)
- 33°25′21″N 130°36′42″E
- Periods: Kofun period
- Location: Chikuzen, Fukuoka, Japan
- Region: Kyushu

Site notes
- Public access: Yes (no public facilities)
- National Historic Site of Japan

The Asakura Sue Kiln Sites (朝倉須恵器窯跡, Asakura sue-ki kama ato) is a collective designation for a number of archaeological sites containing a Kofun period kilns located in the town of Chikuzen, Asakura District, Fukuoka Prefecture, Japan. The sites were designated a National Historic Site of Japan in 2018.

== Overview ==
The site consists of the Koguma, Yamakuma and Yatsunami kiln groups. Sue pottery is believed to have originated in the 5th or 6th century in the Kaya region of southern Korea, and was brought to Japan by immigrant craftsmen. The earliest centralized production of Sue ware was long believed to have been The Suemura kilns in southern Osaka Prefecture; however, archaeological excavations at this site in northern Kyushu is challenging this theory.

The Yamakuma kiln site (山隈窯跡群) is located on the southeastern slope of a hill called Jonyama (Hanatateyama) in former Miwa town, Asakura District, Fukuoka. Excavations were carried out by the Kyushu University in 1989, and a total of four kiln sites were identified. Sue ware, cylindrical haniwa, hand-kneaded pottery, and other artifacts have been excavated from each kiln site. The Sue ware consists mainly of jars, vases, and high cups, and are in the "early sueki,"or earliest form of Sue ware. Cylindrical haniwa and Sue ware items that can be traced to these kilns also have been excavated from kofun burial mounds. The Yamakuma kiln site is thought to have been in operation in the first half of the 5th century, and operations appear to have ceased after a relatively short period of time.

The Koguma kiln site (小隈窯跡) are Yatsunami kiln site (八並窯跡) located nearby. The Koguma site consists of the remains of seven semi-underground kilns, one residence, two workshops, one unknown structure, and two earth pits. When the Yatsumami kiln sites were discovered in 1967, the cross sections of three kilns were exposed on the slope, but they were washed away by a landslide and cannot be seen at present.

The excavated remains have revealed the actual situation of the transition from the production of early Kaya-style Sue ware in the first half to the middle Kofun period (first half of the 5th century) to the production of Suemura-style Sue ware in the latter half of the middle Kofun period (second half of the 5th century), and was one of the earliest places to start producing Sue ware on an industrial scale.

== See also ==
- List of Historic Sites of Japan (Fukuoka)
