= Kanenokuma Site =

Archaeological site in Hakata-ku, Fukuoka, Japan

- 金隈遺跡 (Japanese)
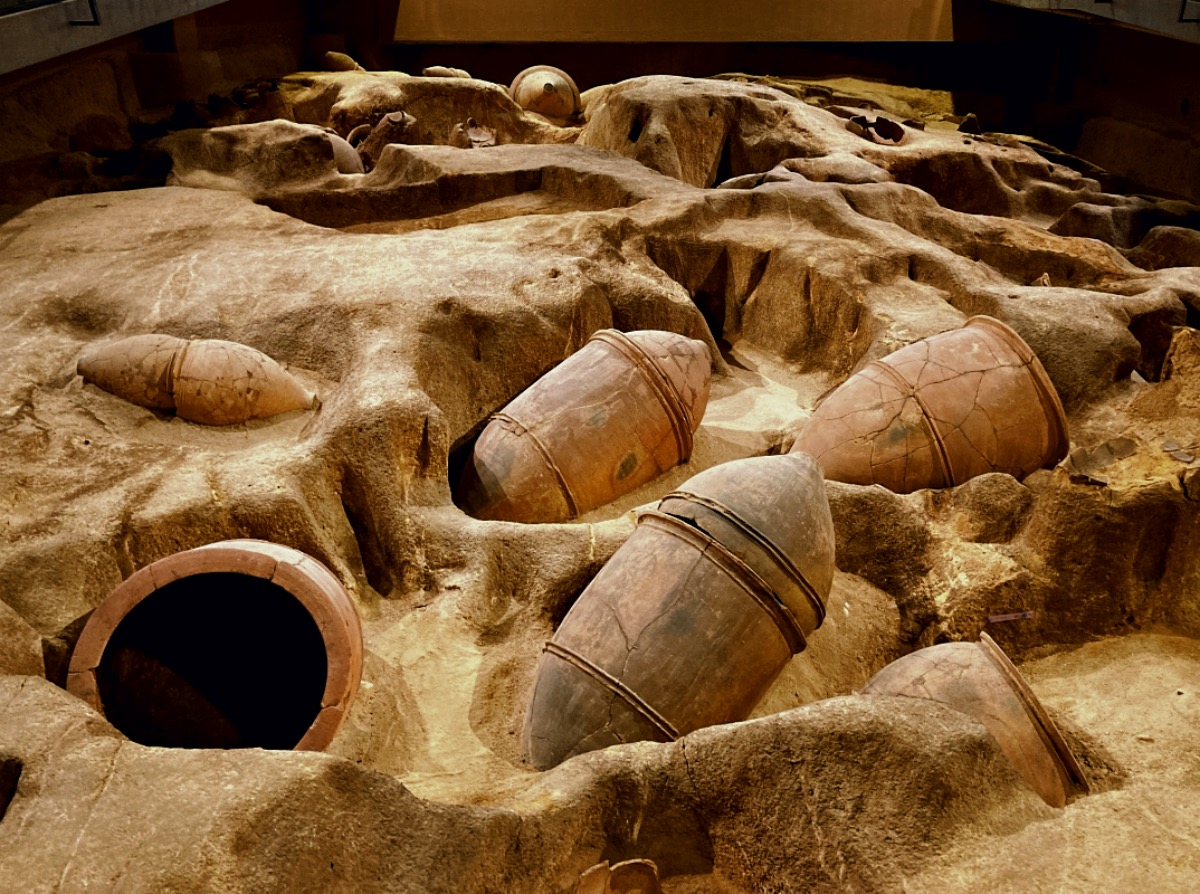
- Jar Coffins at Kanenokuma Ruins Jar Coffin Exhibition Hall

- Kanenokuma Site Kanenokuma Site (Japan)
- Interactive map of Kanenokuma Site
- 33°33′44.6″N 130°28′19.0″E
- Type: necropolis
- Periods: Yayoi period
- Location: Hakata-ku, Fukuoka, Japan
- Region: Kyushu

Site notes
- Public access: Yes (Museum, park)

Kanenokuma Site (金隈遺跡, Kanenokuma iseki) is an archaeological site with a Yayoi period cemetery located in the Kanenokuma neighborhood of Hakata-ku, Fukuoka, Japan. It was designated as a National Historic Site in 1972.

== Overview ==
The Kanenokuma Site is located on a tributary hill of Tsukiguma Hills in the southeastern suburbs of Fukuoka City, and elevation relative to the surrounding rice fields is approximately 25 meters. The site was found by chance in 1968 during construction of a farm road. Archaeological excavations from 1968 found 348 Jar burials, 119 earthen pit burials, and two sarcophagus tombs from the middle of the early Yayoi period (2nd century BC) to the first half of the late Yayoi period (2nd century BC). The majority of the jar burials belong to the middle of the Yayoi period and form the center of the ruins. A range confirmation survey in 1971 revealed that there were unexcavated dolmens in addition to jar tombs and earthen pit tombs in the central part of the same hill.

Although many grave goods have been unearthed, the primary importance of the site are the 136 sets of human remains excavated from the jar graves, from an anthropological point of view. The site revealed that the average height of male was 161.2 centimeters, the average height of female was 151.1 centimeters, and the average age of death was in their 40s. Compared to Jōmon people, the faces of the Yayoi period people at this site are longer and their height is taller. In one grave, two stone arrowheads piecing the bones were found, indicating that at least one of the inhabitants died in a conflict. There were also two instances of tooth ablation, in a man and a woman, which is a characteristic of the Jōmon culture in which upper canine teeth were removed. Grave goods included shell bracelets, made from Gohoura shells which are found only from Tanegashima to Australia.

From 1985 the Kanenokuma Ruins Jar Coffin Exhibition Hall (金隈遺跡甕棺展示館) was opened to the public in site, and excavated artifacts are exhibited.

The site is located 3.3 kilometers, or approximately 12 minutes by car from Minami-Fukuoka Station on the JR Kyushu Kagoshima Main Line.

== See also ==
- List of Historic Sites of Japan (Fukuoka)
