= Hie Site =

Archaeological site in Japan

- 比恵遺跡 (Japanese)
- Hie Site Hie Site (Japan)
- Interactive map of Hie Site
- 33°34′40.1″N 130°25′34.7″E
- Type: settlement
- Periods: Kofun period
- Location: Hakata-ku, Fukuoka, Japan
- Region: Kyushu

Site notes
- Public access: Yes (no facilities)

Hie Site (比恵遺跡, Hie iseki) is a complex archaeological site entered on the remains of a group of raised-floor warehouses built in the late Kofun period (6th to 7th century), located in Hakata-ku, Fukuoka, Japan. It was designated as a National Historic Site in 2001.

== Overview ==
The Hie Site is thought to be the remains of the "Natsu no Miyake" mentioned in the Nihon Shoki in an entry dated 536. The site itself is extensive, and contains traces dating from the Japanese Paleolithic period to the Sengoku period. It is located in the center of the Fukuoka Plain, on a diluvial plateau with an elevation of five to seven meters between the Naka River and the Mikasa River. Although the administrative site name is different from the Naka ruins group adjacent to the southeast, they are one group of ruins, so the sites are sometimes collectively referred to as the Hie-Naka ruins group. The area of both sites combined extends for two kilometers from north-to-south. Additionally, the Isogawa ruins, which are adjacent to the south of the Naka ruins, and the Sanno ruins, which are adjacent to the east of the Hie ruins, are considered to be part of the same complex.

Currently, only the Kofun period warehouse group has been designated as a national historic site and is called the "Hie Ruins". This site is located a block next to the west of Fukuoka City Harusumi Elementary School. In archaeological excavations, two palisade-like remains and the remains of ten pillared buildings were discovered. The pillar foundations were densely erected not only around the outside of the building, but also inside, and this is a construction typically used in raised-floor warehouses. The palisade-like remains are on the north and south sides of the survey area, and they extend from southwest to northeast, almost parallel to the current land division. The buildings vary in size, and the spacing between buildings is not uniform, but all are aligned in groups parallel to the north fence, which shows a degree of planning. Judging from the relationship between the buildings and the remains of previous and subsequent eras, it appears that the buildings was constructed in the late 6th century and was abandoned in the late 7th century.

It is theorized that this is the site of a government office, and there is a high possibility that it is related to the "Natsu official residence" described in the Nihon Shoki, which refers to a local administrative center constructed near the mouth of the Natsu River, which served not only to control and defend northern Kyushu but to act as a window on the Asian continent and to regulate trade. As such, it could be considered the predecessor to the Dazaifu established later after the government's Ritsuryō reforms.

The site is approximately 1.6 kilometers southeast of Hakata Station on the JR Kyushu Kagoshima Main Line.

== See also ==
- List of Historic Sites of Japan (Fukuoka)
