= Yoshitaketakagi Site =

Archaeological in Nishi-ku, Fukuoka, Japan

Yoshitake Takagi Site
- 吉武高木遺跡 (Japanese)
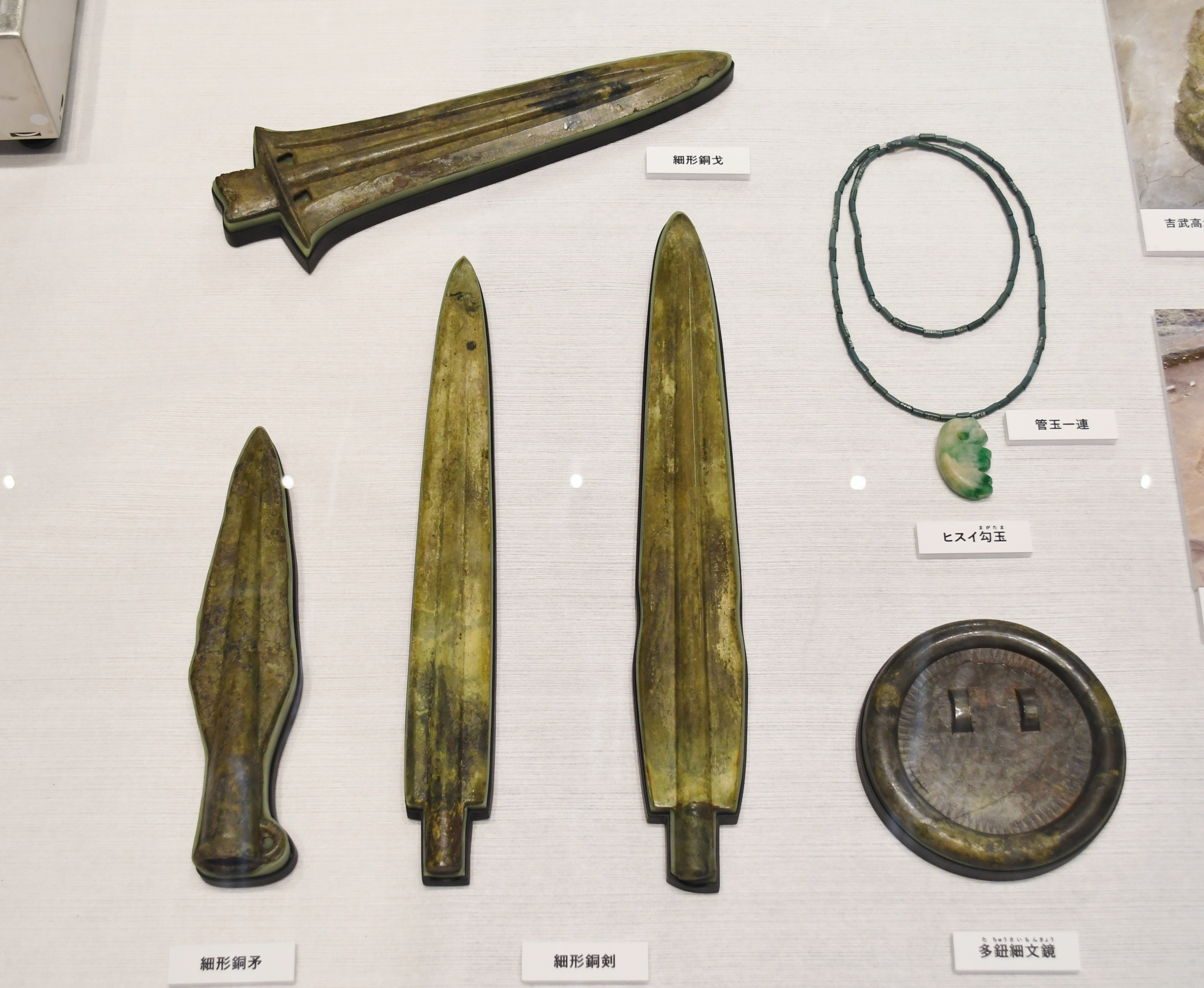
- Artifacts from the Yoshitake Takagi Site

- Yoshitake Takagi Site Yoshitaketakagi Site (Japan)
- Interactive map of Yoshitake Takagi Site
- 33°32′16.6″N 130°19′06.8″E
- Type: necropolis
- Periods: Yayoi period
- Location: Nishi-ku, Fukuoka, Japan
- Region: Kyushu

Site notes
- Public access: Yes (no facilities)
- Website: bunkazai.city.fukuoka.lg.jp/yoshitaketakagi/

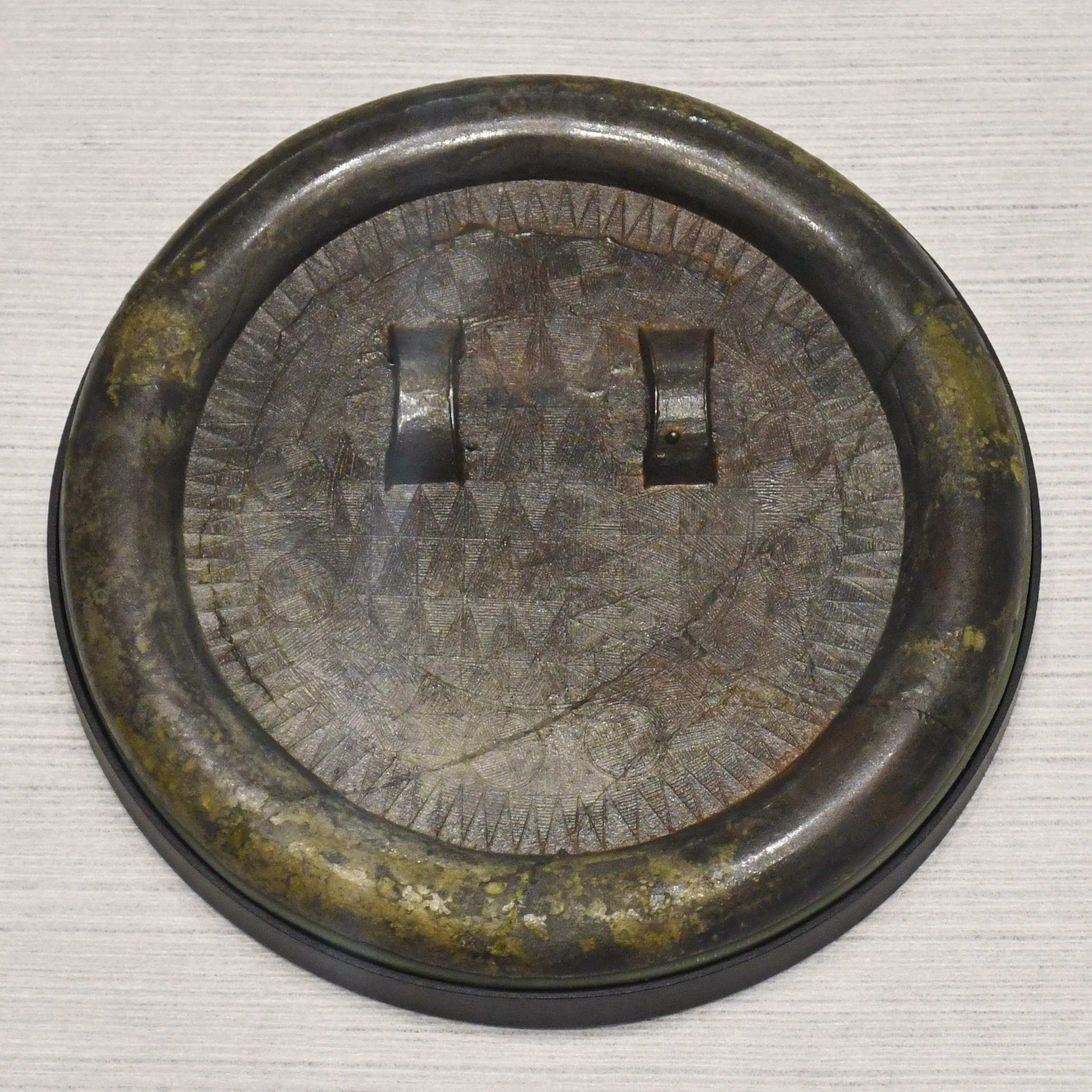
Bronze mirror from Yoshitake Takagi Site

Yoshitake Takagi Site (吉武高木遺跡, Yoshitake Takagi iseki) is an archaeological site with a Yayoi period cemetery located in Nishi-ku, Fukuoka, Japan. It was designated as a National Historic Site in 1993, with the area under protection expanded in 2000. The designated area including the additional designated area is 42,145.17 square meters, which is approximately one-tenth of the area of the entire ruins group.

== Overview ==
The Yoshitake Takagi Site is located on the left bank of the middle stream of the Muromi River, which flows through the central part of the Sawara Plain. This an alluvial fan located at the western end of the Fukuoka Plain. The area forms a complex of ruins called the Yoshitake Ruins, which dates from the Japanese Paleolithic period to the Muromachi, and includes the Yoshitake Hiwatari ruins, which is a burial mound. The Yoshitake Takagi ruins are located at the southern end of the group of ruins, and during archaeological excavations starting in 1984, 34 jar graves, four wooden coffin graves, and three earthen pit graves were discovered in an area of 350 square meters. Adult graves were lined up in an orderly manner facing northeast on the west side of the cemetery area, and children's graves were built on the east side. Only a portion of the site has been excavated, and it is estimated that more than 2,000 pot coffins were buried in a 450-meter-long area. Approximately 50 meters to the east of the cemetery, the traces of a large 12.5 x 9.6 meter building with eaves and a raised-floor were discovered, and are thought to be part of the settlement where the inhabitants resided.

Weapons such as bronze swords and bronze spears, as well as jewelry and bronze mirrors with detailed designs, bronze chimes, and jade magatama were excavated as grave goods. In northern Kyushu, from the end of the Early Yayoi period to the beginning of the Middle Yayoi period, bronze weapons brought over from the Korean Peninsula began to be seen as grave goods, and this site also contains a mirror with a multi-shape pattern that originated from the Korean Peninsula. Other artifacts have been identified as being from the Western Han Dynasty.

Some of the excavated artifacts are on display at the Fukuoka City Museum and 645 items have been collectively designated as National Important Cultural Properties.

The site is approximately a 2.7 kilometers south of Hashimoto Station on the Nanakuma Line of the Fukuoka City Subway.

== See also ==
- List of Historic Sites of Japan (Fukuoka)
