= Mount Shura Site =

Archaeological site in Hisayama, Japan

- 首羅山遺跡 (Japanese)
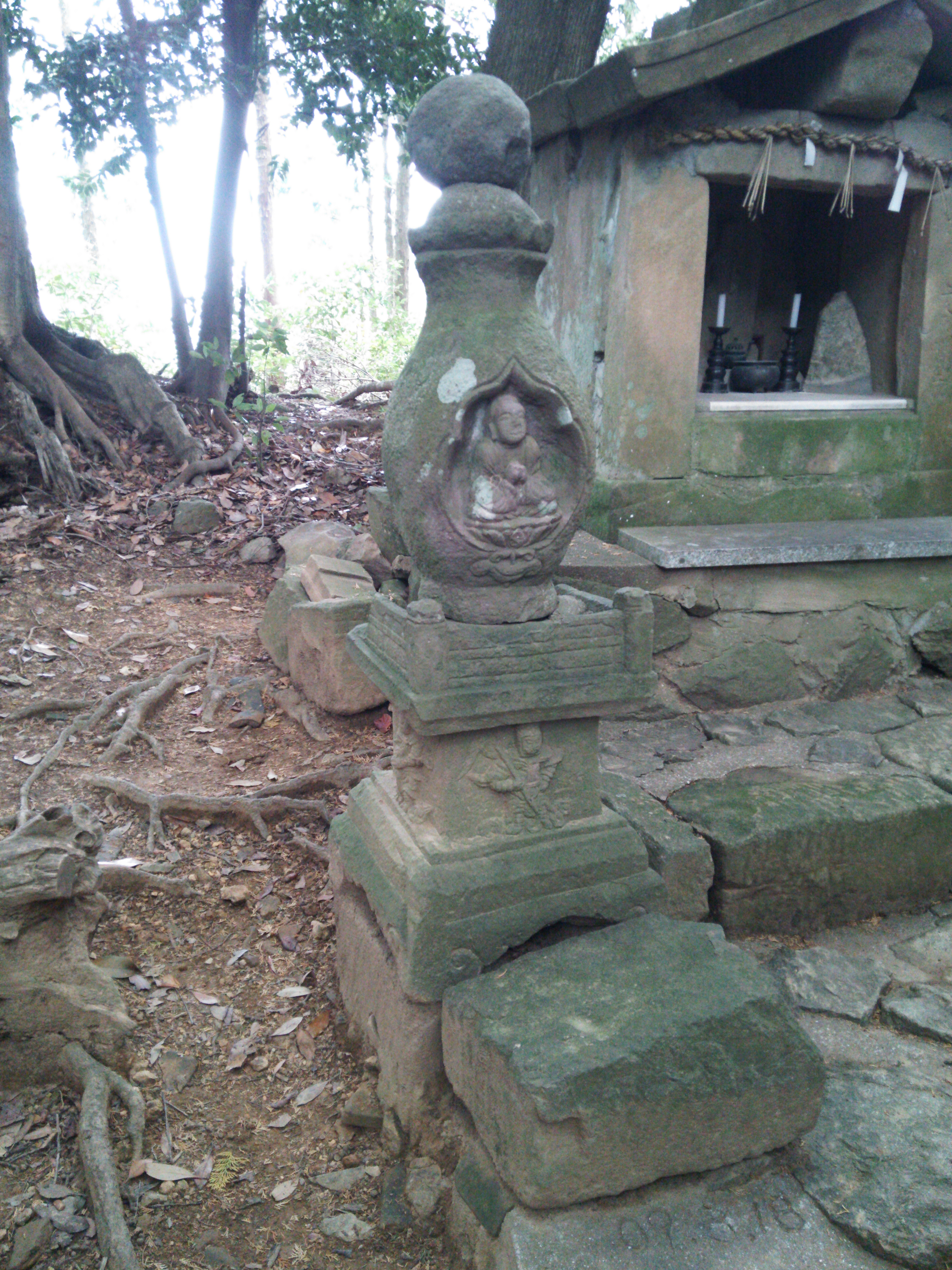
- Satsuma-to on Mount Shura

- Mount Shura Site Mount Shura Site (Japan)
- 33°38′27″N 130°30′47″E
- Periods: Heian period
- Location: Hisayama, Fukuoka, Japan
- Region: Kyushu

Site notes
- Public access: Yes
- National Historic Site of Japan

The Mount Shura Site (首羅山遺跡, Shurasan iseki) is the ruins of a medieval Buddhist temple located in town of Hisayama, Fukuoka Prefecture on the island of Kyushu, Japan. The site was designated a National Historic Site of Japan in 2013.

== Overview ==
The Shurasan ruins is located in the northeastern part of the town of Hisayama. The presence of ruins on the southern side of the 288-meter mountain has been known to locals for a long time, but no formal archaeological excavation was conducted until 2005. Several excavations have been conducted by the Hisayama Town Board of Education and the Kyushu Historical Museum and are still ongoing. The site corresponds to the location of a temple called Tōkō-ji (頭光寺) which historical documentation states was located on this mountain. Although Hisayama is located in the Fukuoka metropolitan area, development activities have been relatively few, and the site has remained in good condition. The ruins are clustered in three areas: the summit of the mountain, the Nishitani Valley and the Sannō (Hiyoshi) area. The site is not opened to the public, but since 2020 a hiking trail cut through the area.

According to legend, during the Tenpyō era (740–749), villages were afraid of a tiger which had crossed over to Japan from Baekje. After they captured and killed the tiger, they cut off its head, but as it glowed, they thought that this supernatural phenomena was due to Hakusan Gongen, so they buried the head and erected a temple dedicated to the Jūichimen Kannon on top. This is the origin of Tōkō-ji. The temple reached the peak of its prosperity during the Kamakura period, when it had over 300 chapels and hermitages on the mountain. The temple was protected by the "Hakata Kōshū", the merchants guild of the port of Hakata, who were mainly immigrants from Song China who had settled in Hakata, and who had formed ties with powerful temples and shrines and aristocrats, and actively engaged in trade activities between Japan and China and in the wider East Asian waters. Their period of activity spanned approximately 200 years from the end of the 11th century to the Mongolian invasion of the latter half of the 13th century. The temple was used as a guest facility for important customers involved in trade with the Asian continent. The temple was largely destroyed in the wars of the Sengoku period, although it remained a holy mountain in the Edo period, when a Shinto shrine was erected on its summit.

Artifacts found in the Shurasan ruins include many shards of trade ceramics, such as blue and white porcelain and Jingdezhen ware from China, and Goryeo celadon from the Korean Peninsula. At the summit of the mountain is a stone pagoda called a "Satsuma-to". This style of monument has been found only in western and southern Kyushu and was brought to Japan from Song China.

== See also ==
- List of Historic Sites of Japan (Fukuoka)
