= Tsuyazaki Kofun Cluster =

- 津屋崎古墳群 (Japanese)
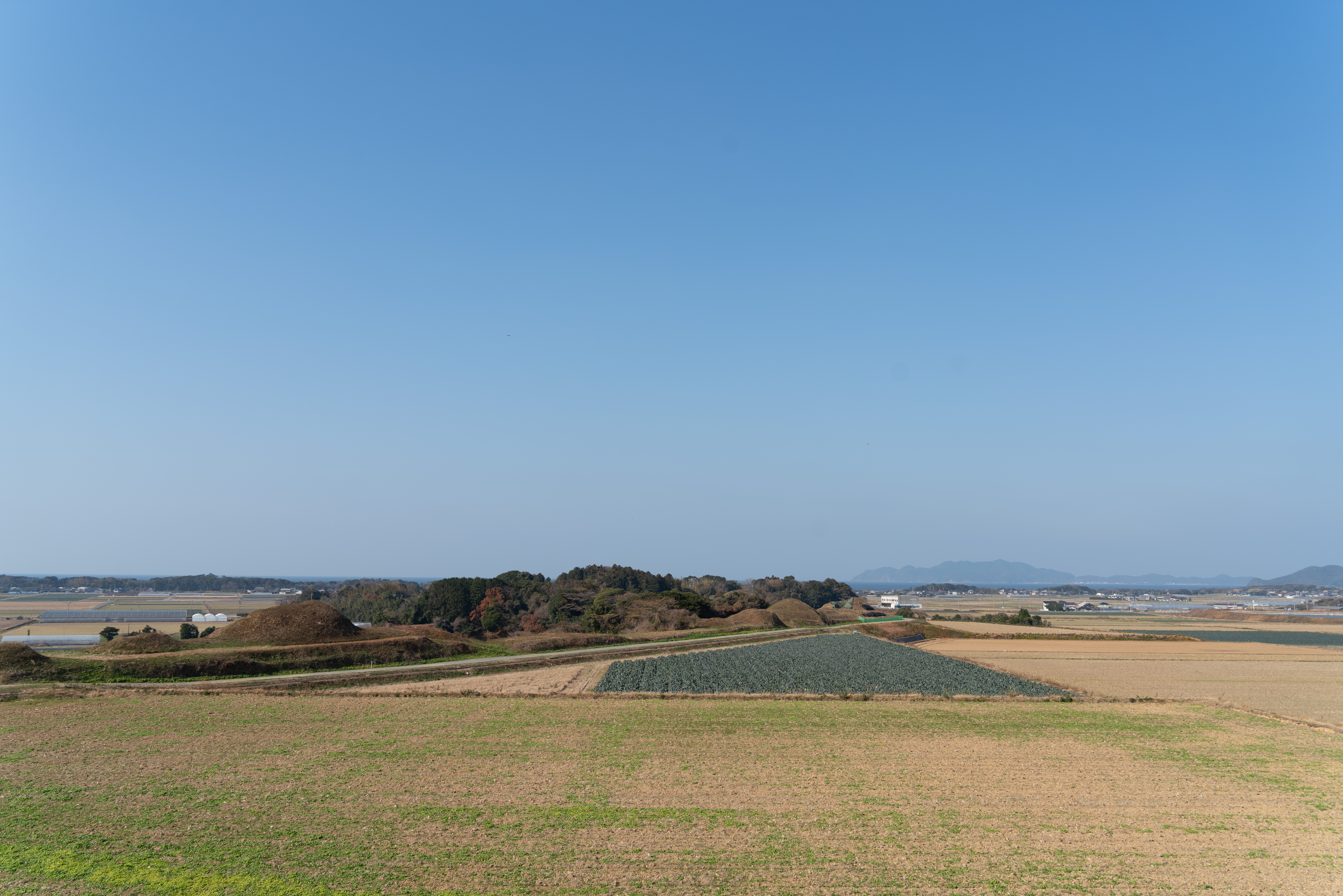
- Shinbaru-Nuyama Kofun Cluster, part of the Tsuyazaki Kofun Cluster

- Tsuyazaki Kofun Cluster Tsuyazaki Kofun Cluster (Japan)
- Interactive map of Tsuyazaki Kofun Cluster
- 33°50′29″N 130°29′16″E
- Type: Kofun
- Periods: Kofun period
- Location: Fukutsu, Fukuoka, Japan
- Region: Kyushu

History
- Built: c.5th - 7th century

Site notes
- Public access: No

UNESCO World Heritage Site
- Type: Cultural (Shinbaru-Nuyama Kofun Cluster only)
- Criteria: ii, iv
- Designated: 2017
- Reference no.

The Tsuyazaki Kofun Cluster (津屋崎古墳群) is a Kofun period burial mound, located in Fukutsu, Fukuoka, Fukuoka Prefecture Japan. The tumulus was designated a National Historic Site of Japan in 2000.

== Overview ==
The Tsuyazaki Kofun cluster is a collective name for several groups of kofun distributed over an area of seven kilometers from north-to-south and two kilometers from east-to-west in the hills that spread in the northern part of Fukutsu City, facing the Genkai Sea in northern Fukuoka Prefecture. From the north, these include the Katsuura Kogen Kofun Cluster (勝浦高原古墳群), the Katsuura Kofun Cluster (勝浦古墳群), the Shinbaru-Nuyama Kofun Cluster (新原・奴山古墳群), Yukue Kofun Cluster (生家古墳群), the Oishi Okanoya Kofun Cluster (大石岡ノ谷古墳群), the Sutada Kofun Cluster (須多田古墳群), and the Miyaji Kofun Cluster (宮司古墳群) Tumulus Group. The site consists of a total of 60 remaining tumuli, including 16 keyhole-shaped zenpō-kōen-fun (前方後円墳) tumuli, 43 round empun (円墳) tumuli, and 1 rectangular hōfun (方墳)) tumulus.The Tsuyazaki tumulus group was built continuously from the first half of the 5th century to the first half of the 7th century. Considering the geographical location in the Munakata region, it is highly likely that these are the tombs of the Munakata-no-Kimi clan, who were responsible for maritime transportation and were involved in rituals on Okinoshima.

Notable among these tumuli is the Miyajidake Kofun (宮地嶽古墳), which has a stone burial chamber over 23 meters in length. Grave goods included a gilt-bronze sword, a gilt-bronze mirror, gilt-bronze horse fittings and decorations, a copper bowl with a lid, a copper disk, a glass plate, a green lapis lazuli round ball, a glass round ball, and other artifacts. This is believed to be the tomb of a daughter of Emperor Tenmu, or of her father, as the grave goods are far more luxurious than those found in normal kofun. These grave goods were collectively designated as a National Treasure in 1952 and are exhibited at the Kyushu National Museum in Dazaifu.

=== Shinbaru-Nuyama Kofun Cluster ===
The Shinbaru-Nuyama Kofun Cluster was constructed in the mid-late Kofun period, from the late 5th century to the late 6th century. In 2017, it was registered as a UNESCO World Heritage Site as one of the constituent assets of the Sacred Island of Okinoshima and Associated Sites in the Munakata Region. It was the only portion of the Tsuyazaki Kofun Cluster to be included in the World Heritage Site designation. The Shinbaru-Nuyama cluster consists of five keyhole-shaped tumuli, one square tumulus, and 41 round tumuli, all of which are serially numbered. In addition, records indicate there were 18 other burial mounds that have lost due to the excavation of surrounding paddy fields. At the time the tumuli was built, there was an inlet on the west side of the hill, but it gradually receded, and in the Edo period it was reclaimed and turned into a salt field, and after the Meiji period, it became a paddy field. There are reservoirs scattered around the tumulus group, but these were built for irrigation in the early modern period and have nothing to do with the tumulus. The hilly area is divided by Japan National Route 495. The basalt used in the stone burial chambers of the kofun was transported by ship from Ainoshima in the Genkai Sea.

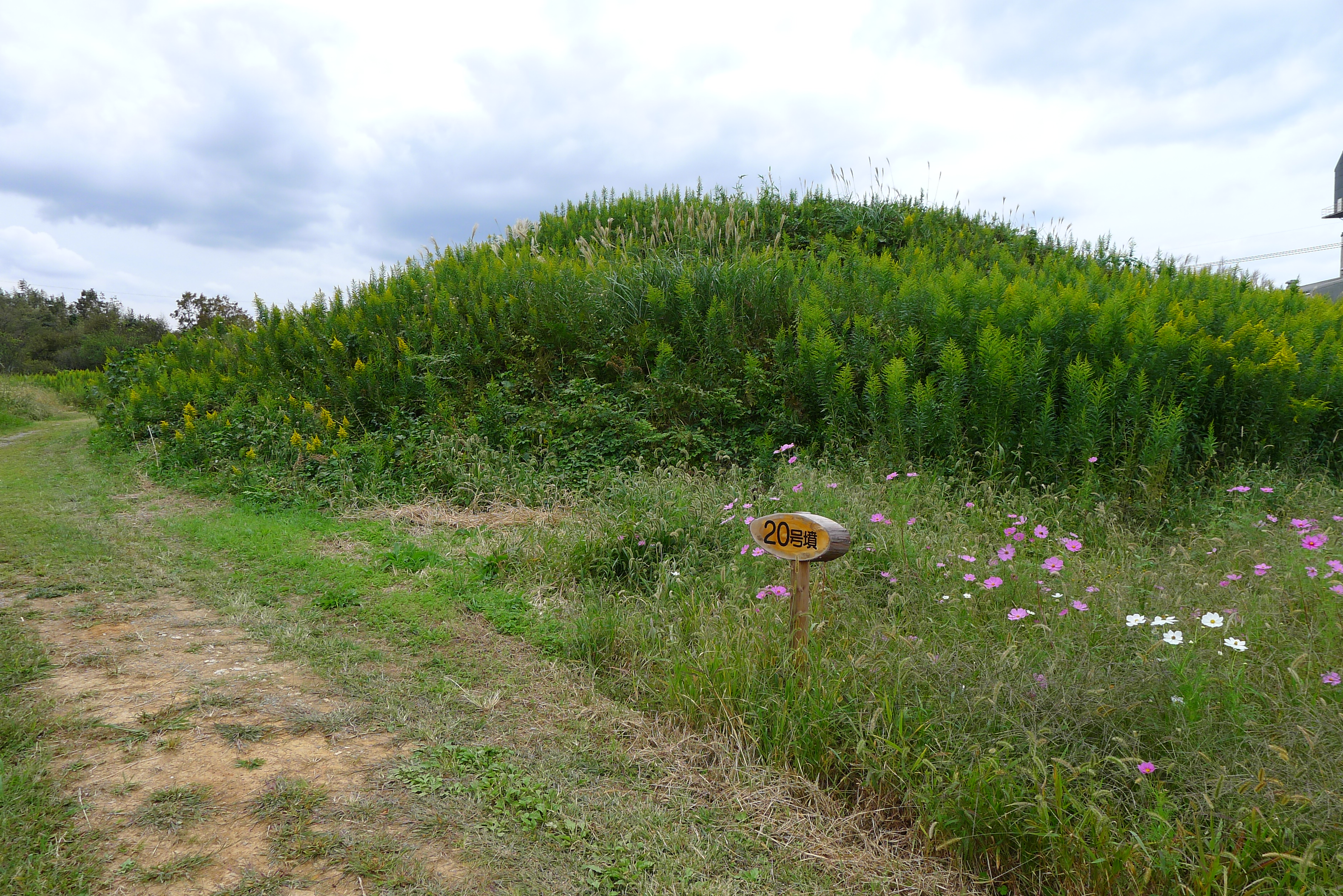
Shinbaru-Nuyama Kofun No.20

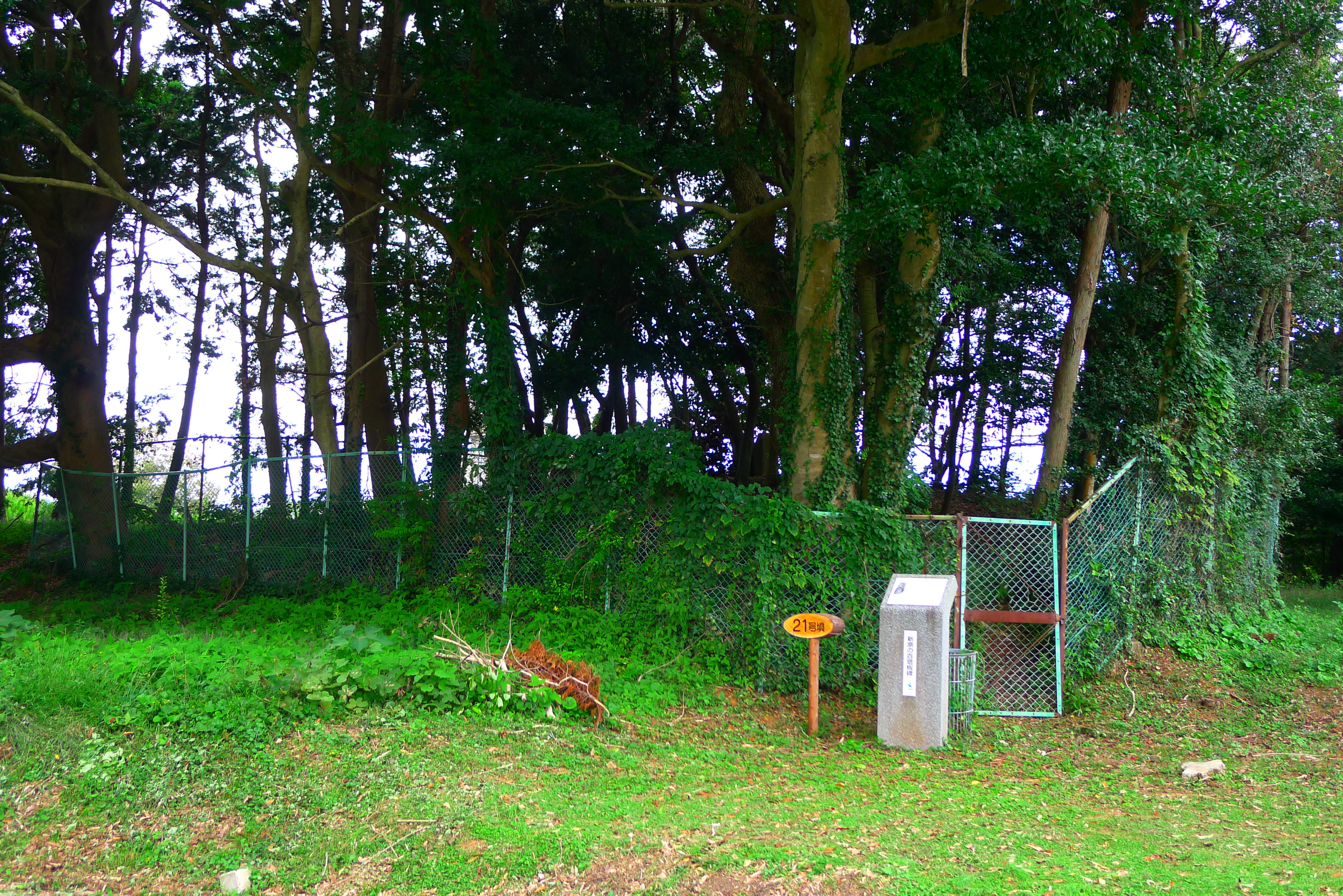
Shinbaru-Nuyama Kofun No.21

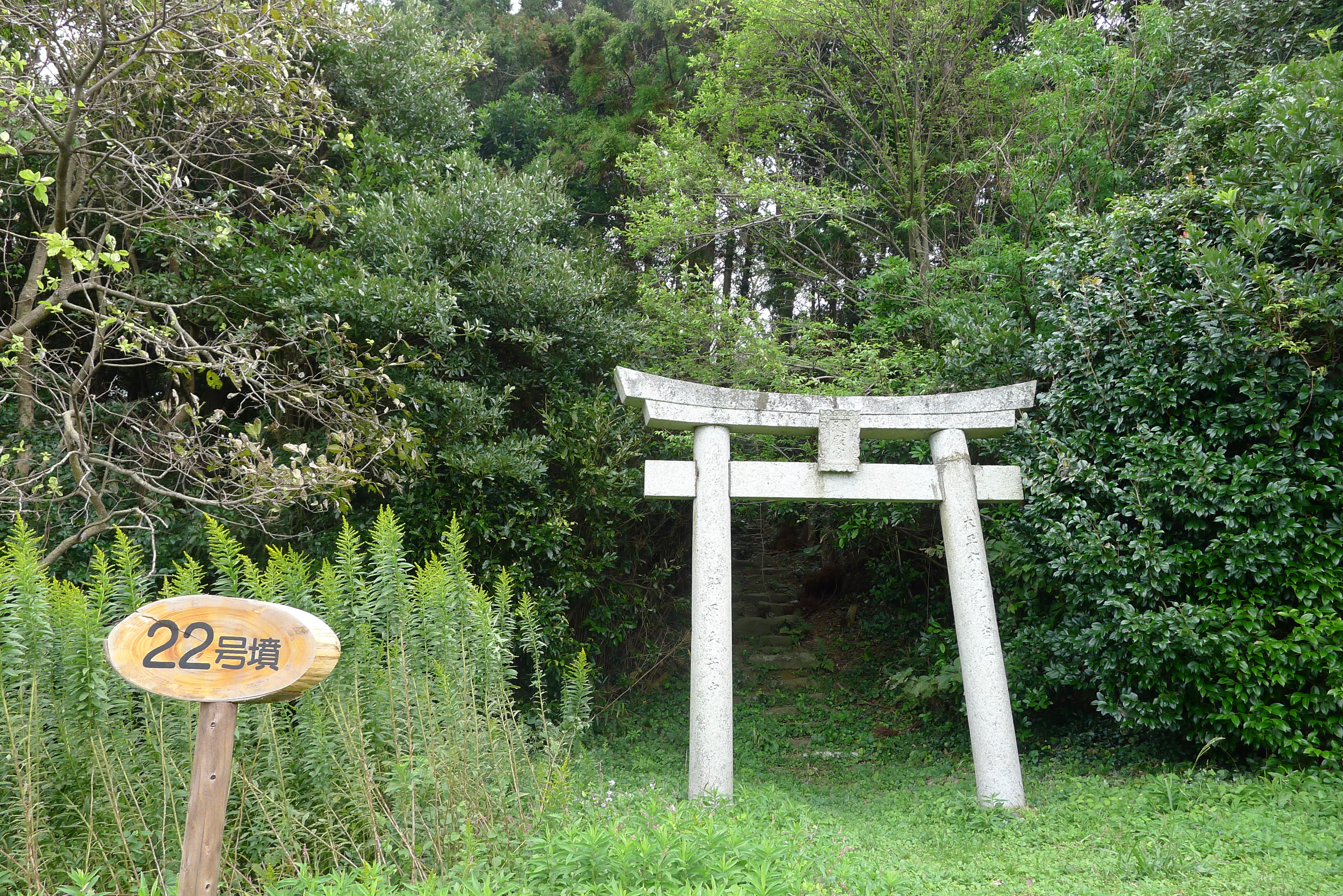
Shinbaru-Nuyama Kofun No.22

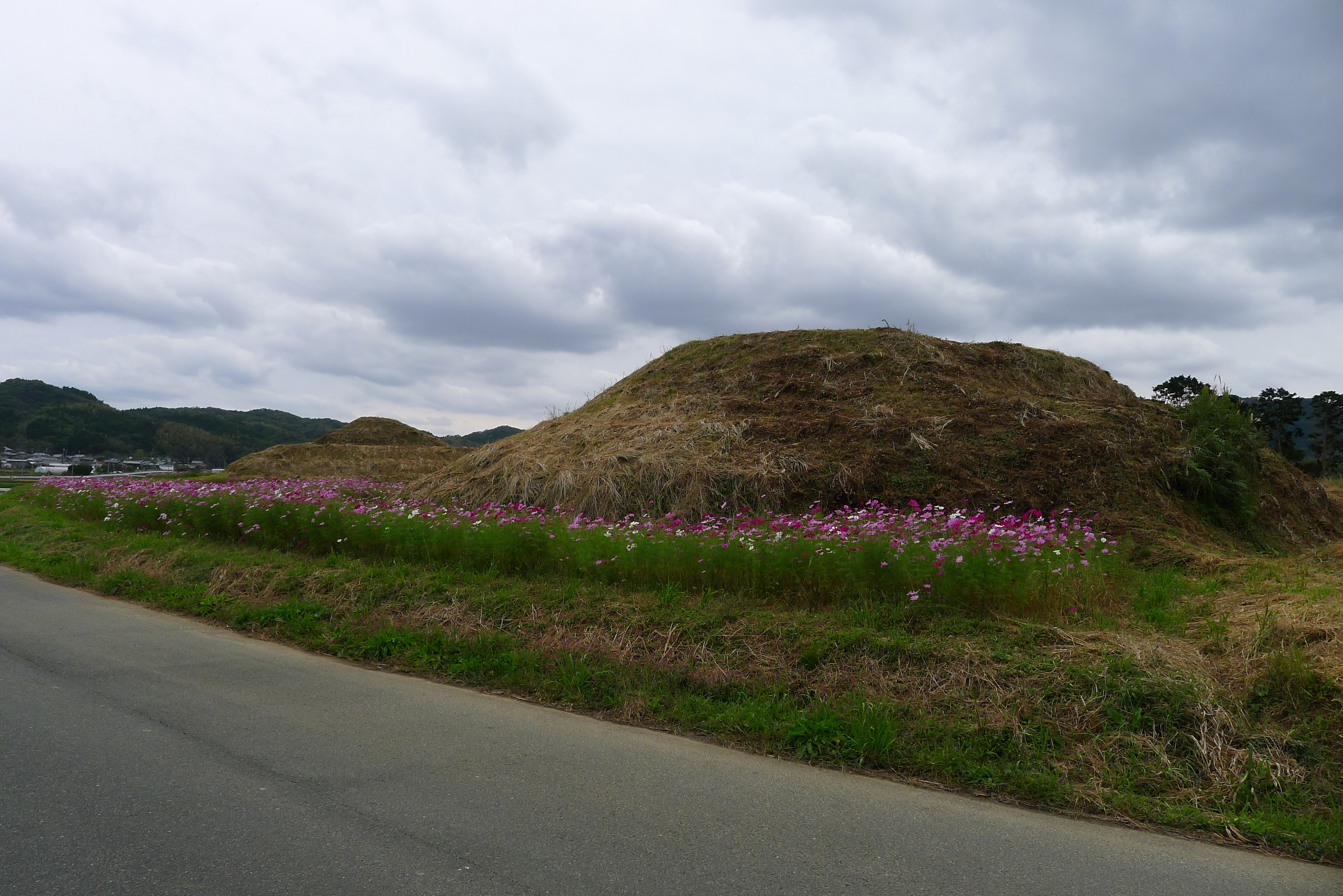
Shinbaru-Nuyama Kofun No.34～36

== See also ==
- List of Historic Sites of Japan (Fukuoka)
