= Obase-Nishikōdai-mae Station =

Railway station in Kanda, Fukuoka Prefecture, Japan

JF 09 Obase-Nishikōdai-mae Station 小波瀬西工大前駅
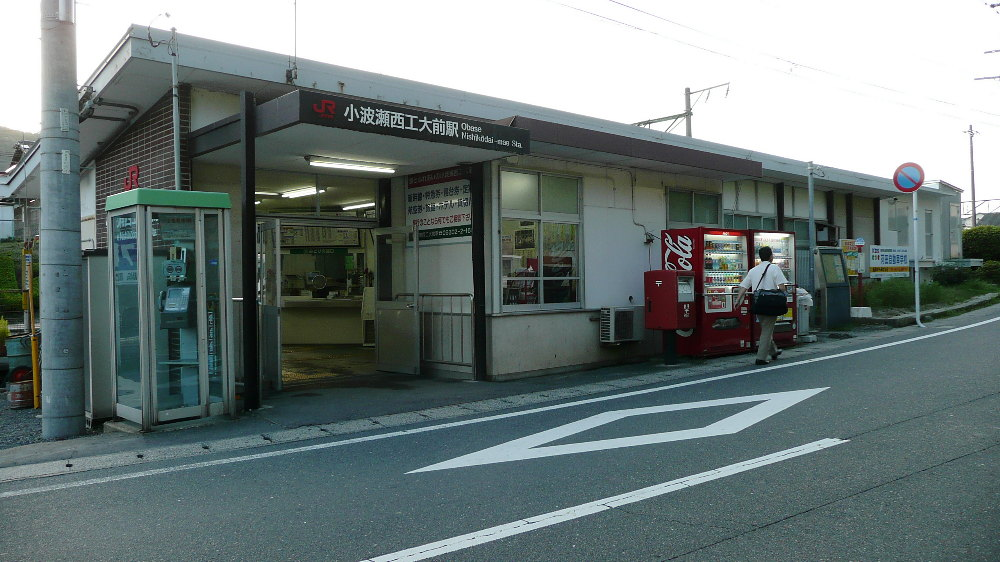
- Obase-Nishikōdai-mae Station building in August 2007

General information
- Location: Aratsu, Kanda-machi, Miyako-gun, Fukuoka-ken 800-0344; Japan
- Coordinates: 33°45′11″N 130°58′19″E
- Operator: JR Kyushu
- Line: JF Nippō Main Line
- Distance: 22.2 km from Kokura
- Platforms: 1 side + 1 island platform
- Tracks: 3

Other information
- Status: Staffed
- Station code: JF09
- Website: Official website

History
- Opened: 28 May 1948
- Former names: Obase (to 1992)

Passengers
- FY2020: 1380 daily

Services
Preceding station	JR Kyushu	Following station
Yukuhashi towards Kagoshima	Nippō Main Line	Kanda towards Kokura
Location
- Location within Fukuoka Prefecture Location within Japan

Obase-Nishikōdai-mae Station (小波瀬西工大前駅, Obase-Nishikōdai-mae-eki) is a passenger railway station located in the town of Kanda, Fukuoka Prefecture, Japan. It is operated by JR Kyushu.

== Lines ==
Obase-Nishikōdai-mae Station is served by the Nippō Main Line and is located 22.2 km from the starting point of the line at Kokura.

== Layout ==
The station consists of one side platform and one island platform serving three tracks, connected to the reinforced concrete station building by a footbridge. The station is staffed.

=== Platforms ===
1	■ JF Nippō Main Line	for Yukuhashi and Nakatsu
2, 3	■ JF Nippō Main Line	for Kokura

== History ==
Obase Signal was established on 28 May 1944, and was elevated to passenger station status on 15 October 1948 as Obase Station (小波瀬駅). It was renamed to its present name on 1 October 1992.

== Passenger statistics ==
In fiscal 2020, there was a daily average of 1380 boarding passengers at this station.

== Surrounding area ==
- Nishinippon Institute of Technology

== See also ==
- List of railway stations in Japan
