= Nissan Rogue =

Compact crossover SUV by Nissan

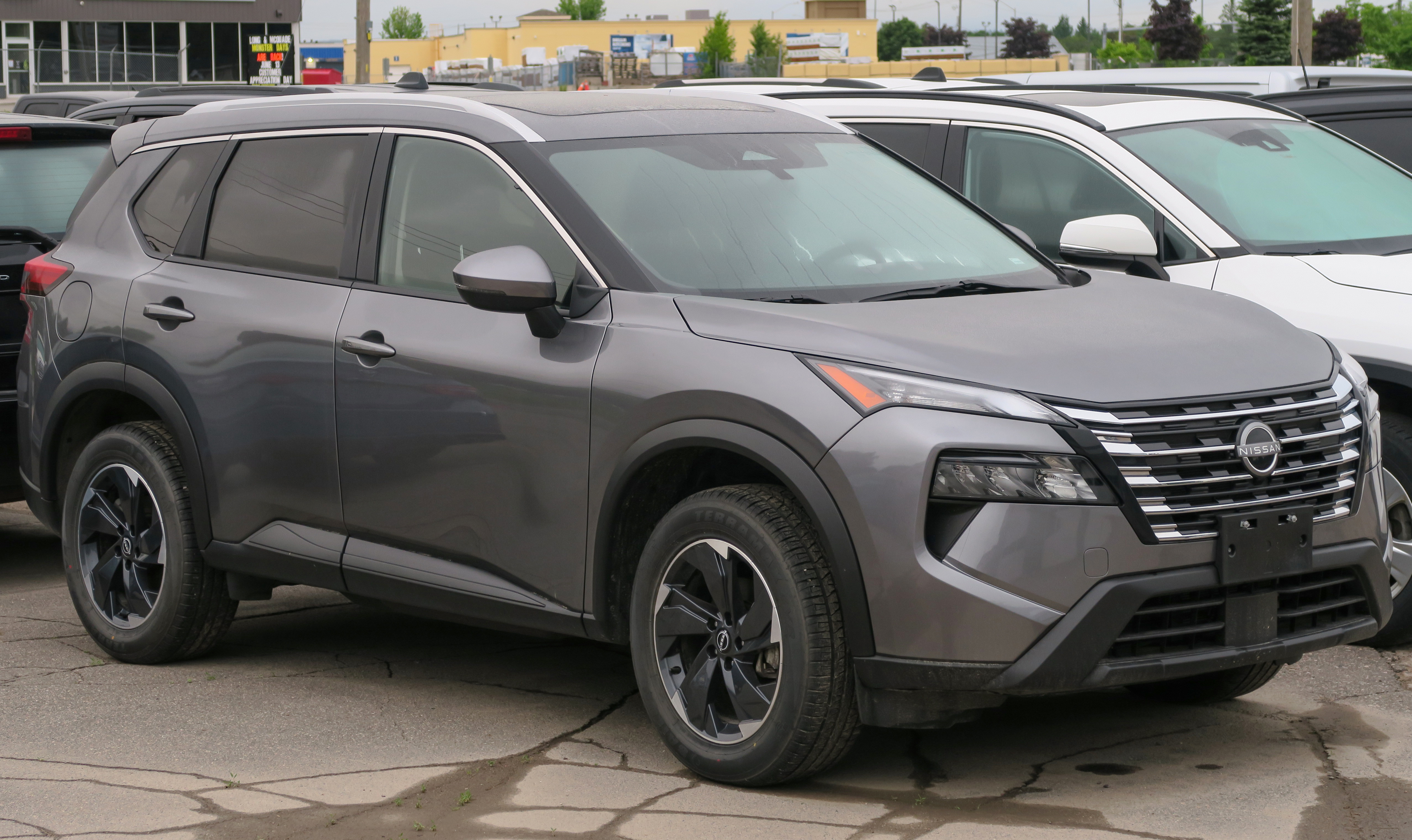
- Third-generation Rogue (facelift)

Overview
- Manufacturer: Nissan
- Also called: Nissan X-Trail (2013–present); Mitsubishi Outlander (2026, Rogue PHEV only)
- Production: 2007–present
- Model years: 2008–present

Body and chassis
- Class: Compact crossover SUV
- Body style: 5-door SUV
- Layout: Front-engine, front-wheel-drive or all-wheel-drive

Chronology
- Predecessor: Nissan Mistral; Nissan X-Trail; Nissan Xterra

The Nissan Rogue is a compact crossover SUV produced by the Japanese automobile manufacturer Nissan. It made its debut in October 2007 for the 2008 model year. Beginning in 2013 for the 2014 model year, the model has been merged with the X-Trail sold outside the North American market, making them identical.

As of 2023, the Rogue was manufactured at the Nissan Smyrna Assembly Plant in Tennessee, United States and at the Nissan Motor Kyushu plant in Kanda, Fukuoka, Japan. Between August 2014 and March 2020, it was also built at the Renault Samsung Motors plant in Busan, South Korea under contract.

== First generation (S35; 2008) ==
First generation
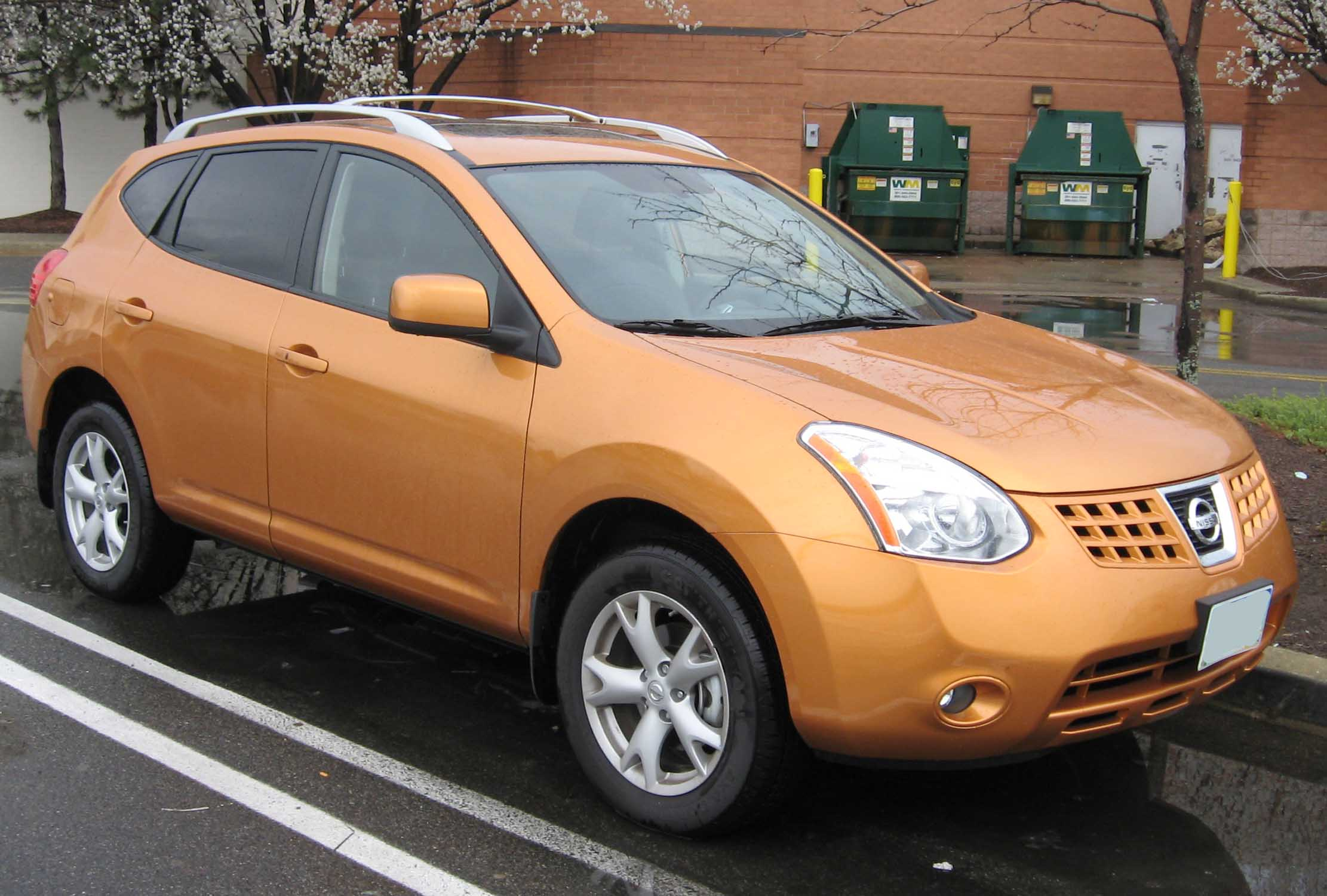
- 2008 Nissan Rogue SL

Overview
- Model code: S35
- Also called: Nissan Rogue Select (2014–2015)
- Production: 2007–2015
- Model years: 2008–2013 (as Rogue); 2014–2015 (as Rogue Select)
- Assembly: Japan: Kanda, Fukuoka (Nissan Motor Kyushu)

Body and chassis
- Platform: Renault–Nissan C platform
- Related: Nissan Qashqai (J10); Nissan X-Trail (T31); Renault Koleos I

Powertrain
- Engine: Gasoline: 2.5 L QR25DE I4
- Transmission: CVT

Dimensions
- Wheelbase: 105.9 in (2,690 mm)
- Length: 182.9–184.3 in (4,646–4,681 mm)
- Width: 70.9 in (1,801 mm)
- Height: 65.3 in (1,659 mm)
- Curb weight: 3,529 lb (1,601 kg)

The first-generation Rogue made its debut at the North American International Auto Show in Detroit on 7 January 2007. It replaces the Nissan X-Trail in Canada as Nissan's entry-level SUV and the body-on-frame Nissan Xterra in Mexico due to the Smyrna plant freeing capacity for the Suzuki Equator, although the Xterra continued on sale in the United States and Canada through the 2015 model year after being withdrawn from the Mexican market after the 2008 model year.

The first-generation Rogue was available in three trim levels in the United States: S, SV and SL, available with front-wheel drive and all-wheel drive.

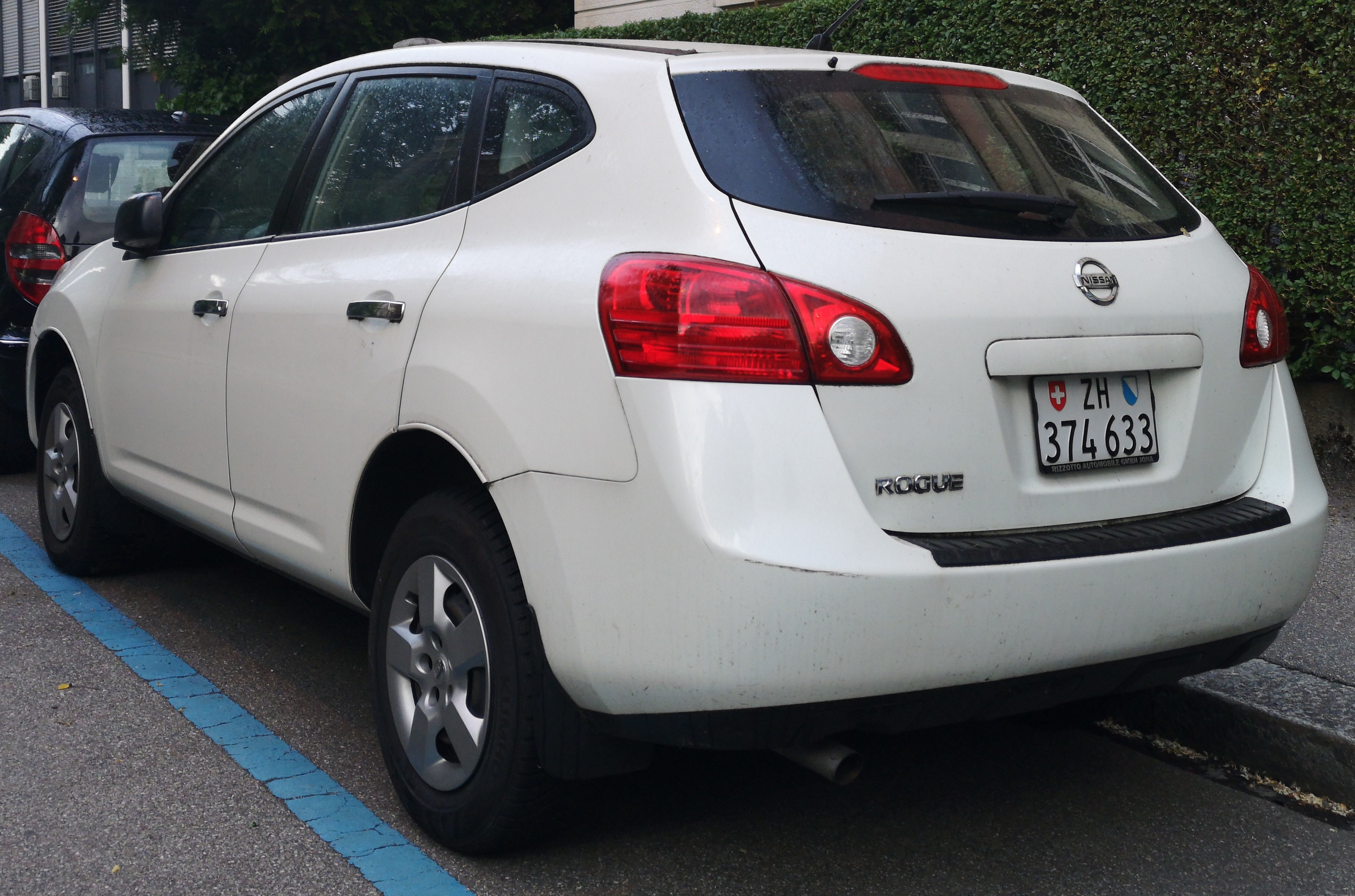
Rear view

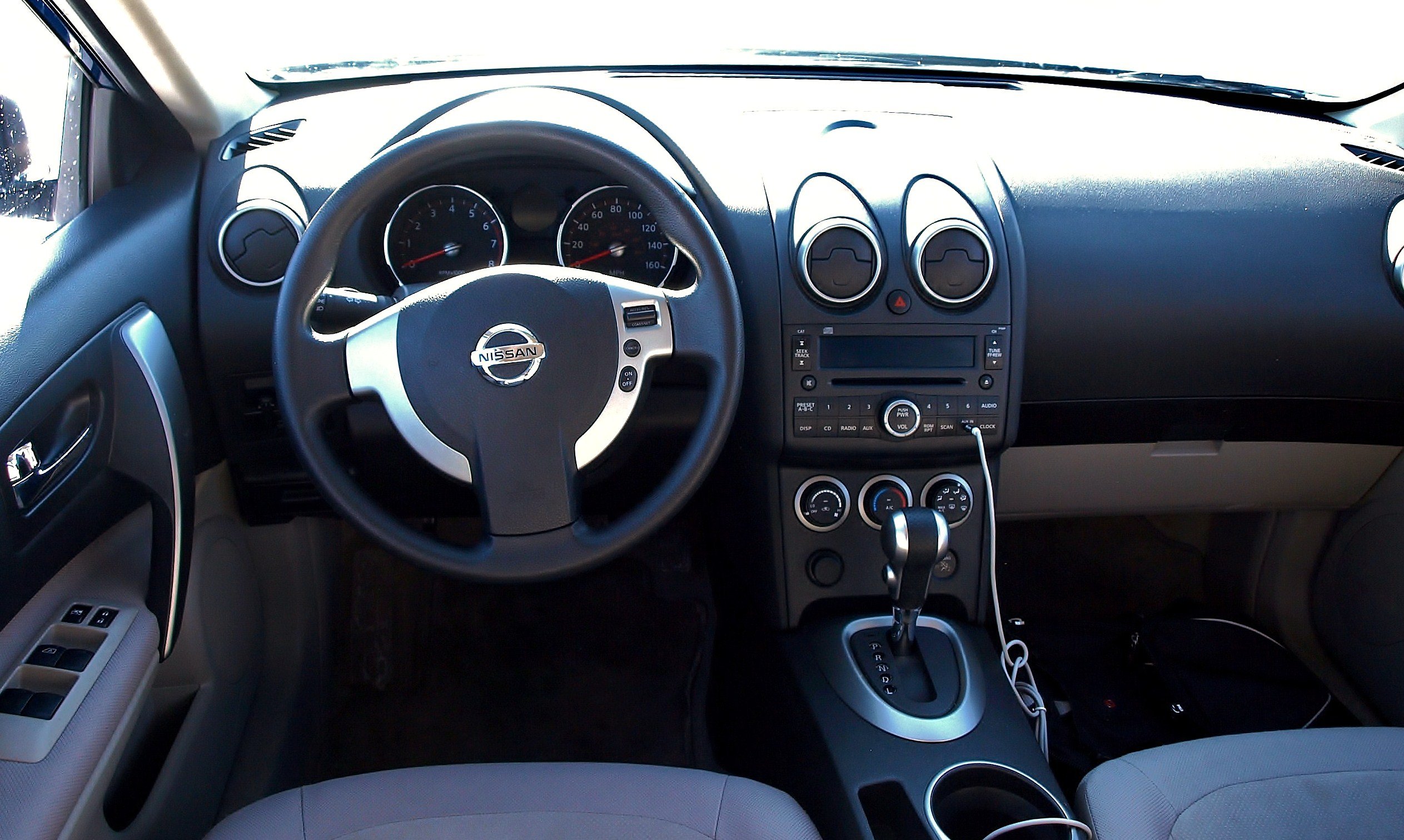
Interior

=== 2011 model year update ===
Changes to the Rogue include redesigned exterior featuring a new front fascia and grille, new front and rear spoilers, redesigned gauges recolored from orange to black, redesigned center dash for addition of the navigation system, new low rolling resistance tires (available with the 17-inch aluminum-alloy wheels) and a new under-body cover.

The Rogue S Krōm Edition is a version of Rogue S with more aggressive styling, sport-tuned exhaust, 18-inch polished wheels and tires, a unique grille and bumper with fog lamps, and other styling tweaks. The vehicle was unveiled at the 23rd Annual International Z Car Convention in Nashville.

US models went on sale at Nissan dealers nationwide beginning 13 August 2010. Early models include S and SV.

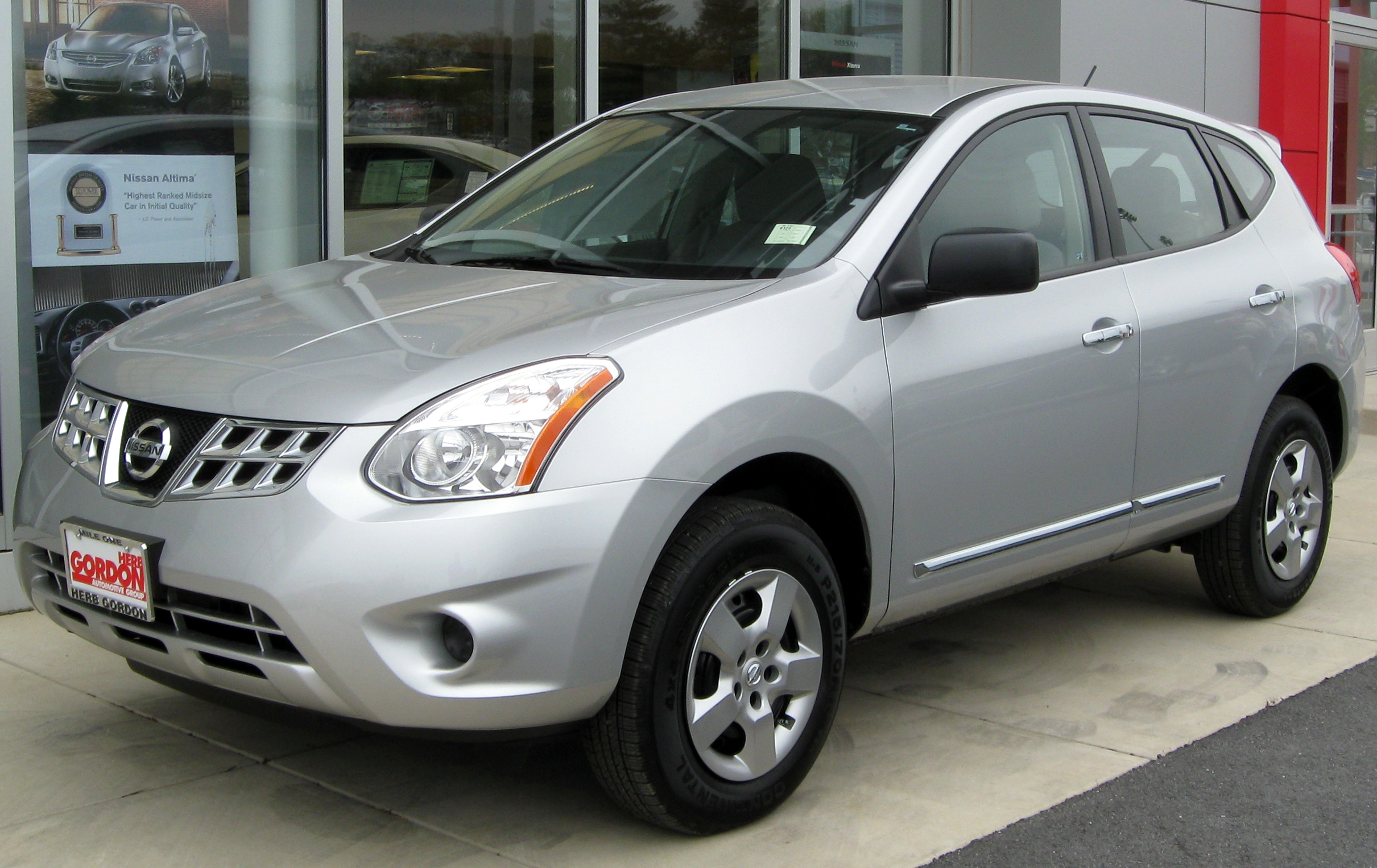
2011 Nissan Rogue S

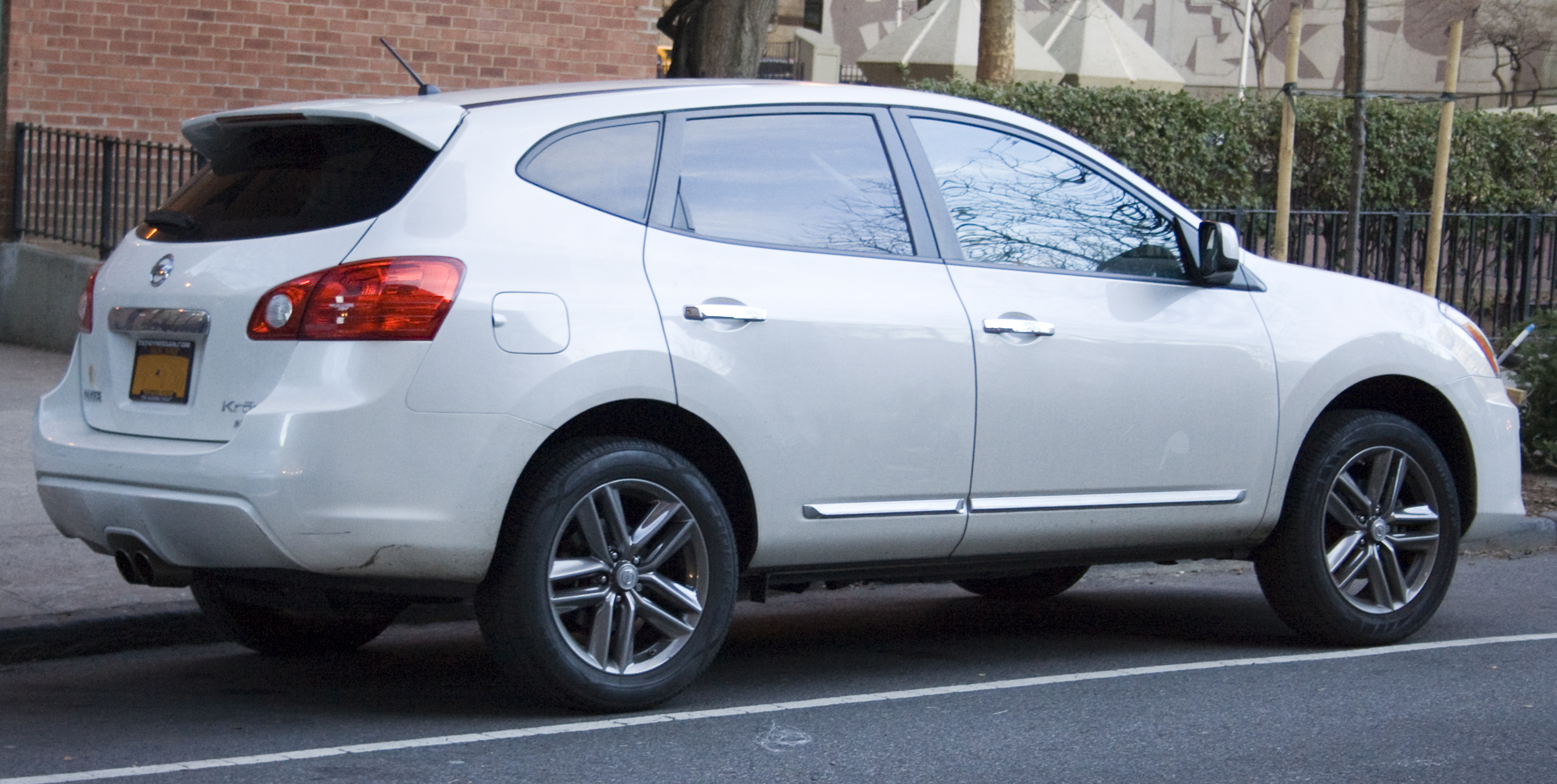
2011 Nissan Rogue "Krōm" rear view

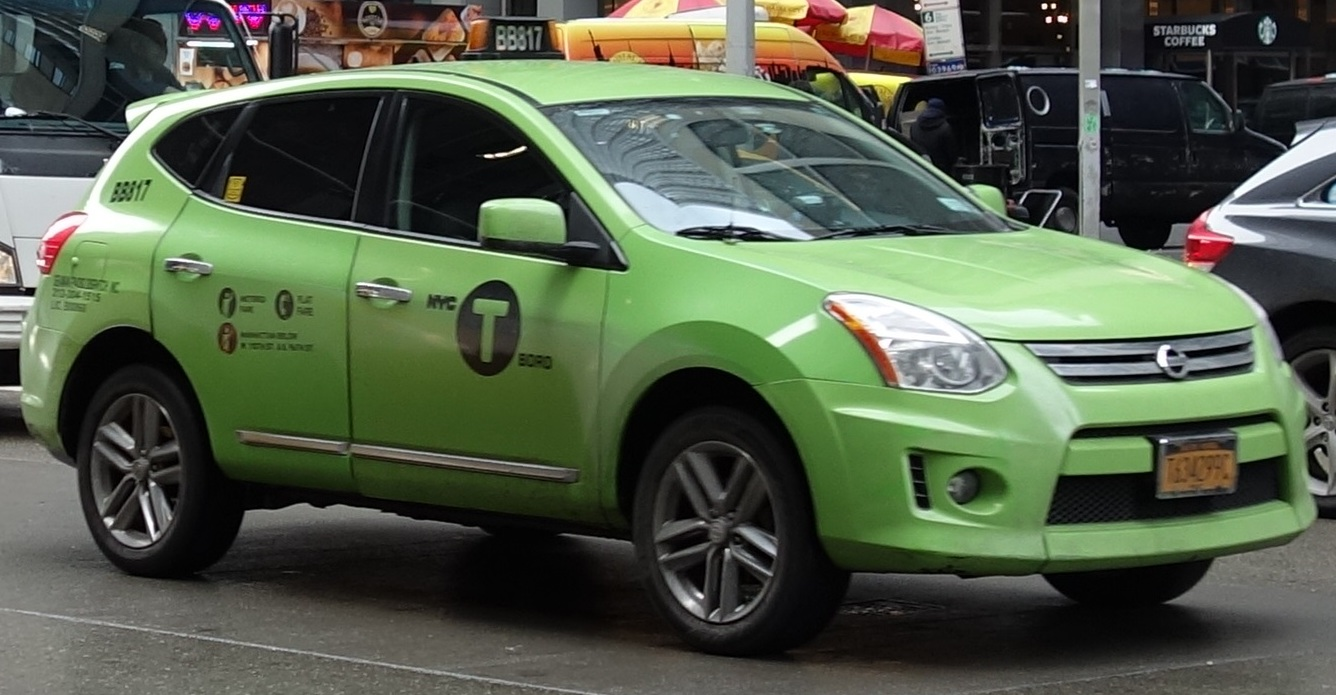
Nissan Rogue "Krōm" used as a Boro taxi in New York City

=== Equipment ===
The SV is available with an optional SL package, adding leather seats, touch screen navigation system and 18-inch alloy wheels, along with other premium features.

=== Recalls ===
Nissan vehicles with Garmin Navi 750, 760 and 765 GPS devices, which included Rogue sold with the Garmin devices between 2008 and 2010, were recalled in 2010 due to overheating. On 23 November 2011, Nissan announced a recall of 7,365 2011 Rogue vehicles for improperly manufactured electric power steering (EPS) assist units, which over time could cause the power assist feature to fail, causing a loss of power assist and an increased risk of an accident.

=== 2012 model year update ===
Changes to the 2012 Rogue includes new aluminum-alloy wheels design, sport mode to the CVT, one new exterior color (Graphite Blue), Around View Monitor for SL package, which creates a composite top-view of the vehicle's surrounding and displays it through a LCD monitor.

"Special Edition" (replaced "Krom" edition) adds 16-inch alloy wheels, a premium audio system, satellite radio, privacy glass, rear view monitor and fog lamps to the S trim.

In Canada, the Rogue comes in S and SV trim in front- or all-wheel-drive, and in a top-line SL trim in all-wheel-drive.

==== Recalls ====
In February 2012, Nissan recalled 2,983 MY 2012 versions of the Murano and Rogue, because the tire pressure monitoring system was not activated when the cars were assembled.

=== Rogue Select ===
The Select was a continuation of the first generation Rogue sold alongside an all-new Rogue that went on sale in 2013 as a 2014 model. Since the production capacity allowed for the first generation to be built in conjunction with the second generation, it allowed for a lower entry price to Rogue customers as well as fleet sales. The Rogue Select was offered only in the S trim level, with AWD being an option. It went on sale in January 2014 as a 2014 model year vehicle and was continued through 2015. Nissan then announced that 2015 would be the final year. The Rogue Select was not offered in Canada.

Similar to the Japanese built Rogue and the Nissan X-Trail, the Rogue Select was built at the Nissan Motor Kyushu Plant in Kanda, Fukuoka in Japan.

=== Safety ===
Safety features in the Rogue include front airbags, side-impact airbags, side-curtain airbags with rollover sensors, tire-pressure monitor, ABS with brake-assist and electronic brake-force distribution, traction control, and anti-skid control. The following summarizes the National Highway Traffic Safety Administration (NHTSA) Crash Test Ratings

Frontal Driver	(5 stars out of 5)
Frontal Passenger	(4 stars out of 5)
Side Impact	(5 stars out of 5)
Rollover	(4 stars out of 5)

In the IIHS evaluation of the 2013 model year, the Rogue achieved a "Good" crashworthiness rating for Head Restraints & Seats, Side, and Moderate Overlap Front, while achieving an “Acceptable” rating in Roof Strength, and a "Marginal" rating in Small Overlap Front. Modifications were made starting in the 2014 model year which increased the Small Overlap Front and Roof Strength ratings to "Good".

==== Awards and recognition ====
- 2010 Rogue Awarded Consumers Digest's Automotive Best Buy Award.
- 2010 Rogue Received the U.S. National Highway Traffic Safety Administration (NHTSA)'s Highest Side-Impact Safety Rating (five stars).

== Second generation (T32; 2014) ==
Second generation
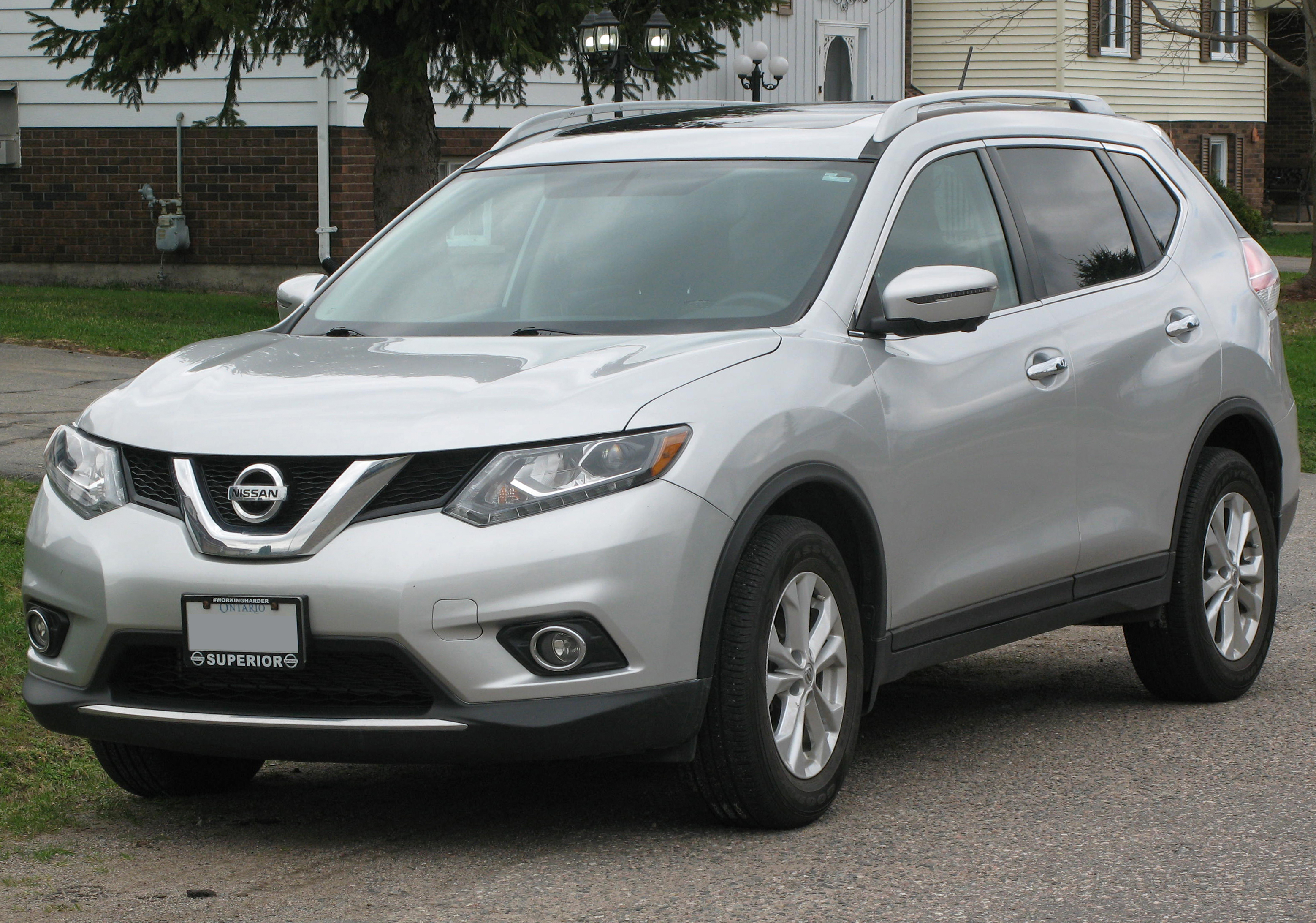
- 2016 Nissan Rogue SV

Overview
- Model code: T32
- Also called: Nissan X-Trail
- Production: 2013–2020
- Model years: 2014–2020
- Assembly: United States: Smyrna, Tennessee (Nissan USA); South Korea: Gangseo, Busan (Renault Samsung); Japan: Kanda, Fukuoka (Nissan Motor Kyushu)
- Designer: Nobutaka Tase and Kazunori Murabayashi

Body and chassis
- Platform: Renault–Nissan CMF-CD platform
- Related: Nissan Qashqai/Rogue Sport (J11); Renault Koleos II

Powertrain
- Engine: Gasoline: 2.0 L Renault–Nissan M5R I4; 2.5 L QR25DE I4
- Transmission: CVT

Dimensions
- Wheelbase: 106.5 in (2,705 mm)
- Length: 182.7 in (4,641 mm)
- Width: 71.7 in (1,821 mm)
- Height: 67.3 in (1,709 mm)

The second generation Rogue is a version of the Nissan X-Trail and inspired by the Hi-Cross Concept to adapt to the US and Canada markets. Changes include optional third row 7 passenger seating, standard four-wheel independent suspension, electric power-assisted steering and four-wheel disc brakes with an anti-lock braking system. This generation has an interior size similar to Nissan's Murano, Altima and Maxima. For the 2018 model year, Nissan decided to drop the third row option in favor of optimizing interior passenger room and cargo utility space.

The vehicle was unveiled at the 2013 Frankfurt Motor Show. US models went on sale in November 2013 as a 2014 model year vehicle. Early models included 2.5-liter 4-cylinder QR25DE engine rated 170 hp (127 kW) and 175 pound-feet (237 N⋅m), Xtronic CVT Jatco CVT8 with standard Sport Mode switch, 3 trims (S, SV and SL, each in a choice of front-wheel or all-wheel drive).

Production of the 2014 Rogue began at Smyrna, Tennessee as the facility's 10 millionth vehicle. Production of the Rogue crossover at South Korean manufacturer Renault Samsung Motors's Busan plant started in September 2014, with an annual capacity of about 80,000 units. The 2014 Rogue received the distinction of being the first automobile to be manufactured in South Korea for a Japanese automaker and sold under a Japanese brand, thanks to the Renault–Nissan Alliance, in which the Rogue is built by Renault Samsung Motors in Busan.

In 2016, the Rogue became Nissan's top-selling model for the first time, a total of 329,904 sales reflecting a 14.9 percent increase.

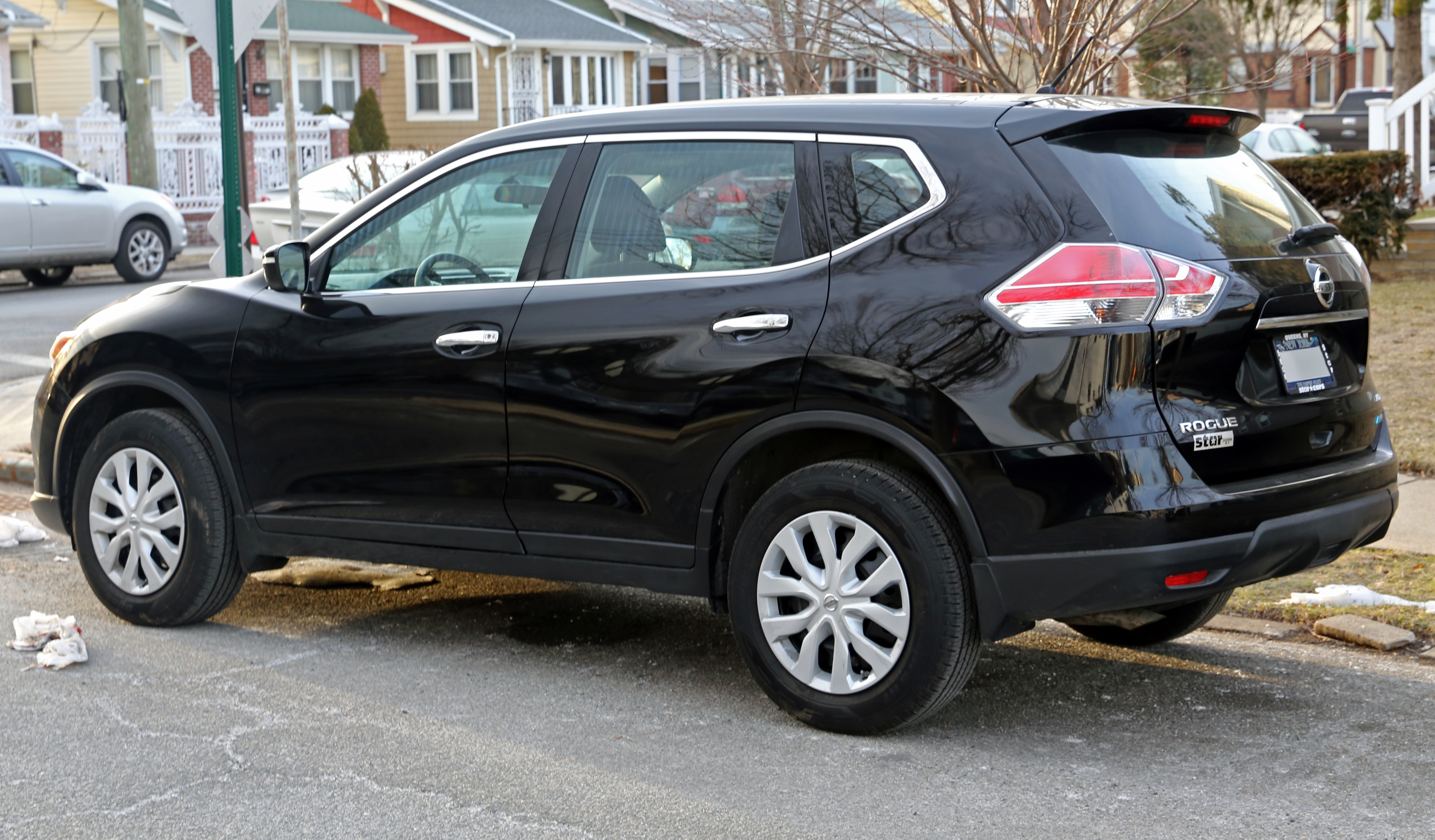
Rear view

=== Model year updates ===
==== 2016 ====
The 2016 model comes with technology such as NissanConnect with Navigation, Siri Eyes Free and many other new features. Eight exterior colors are offered.

==== 2017 ====
The Rogue was facelifted for the 2017 model year, with restyled headlights and tail lights, and LED daytime running lights standard on all trim levels. The SL trim is also available with full LED headlamps as part of the SL Premium Package. The front grille plastics also changed, with the wider V-Motion grille, that Nissan has throughout its lineup.

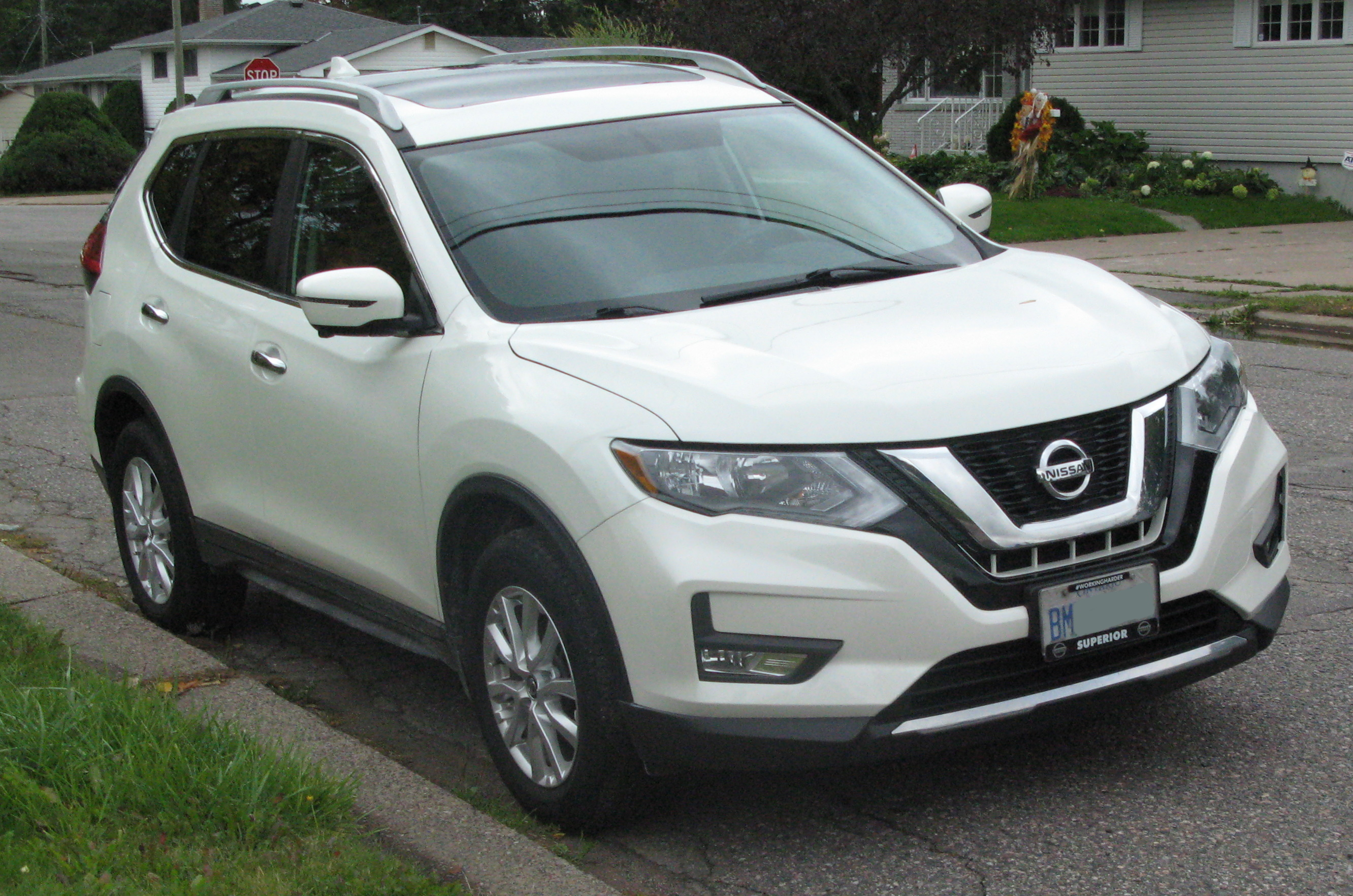
2017 Nissan Rogue

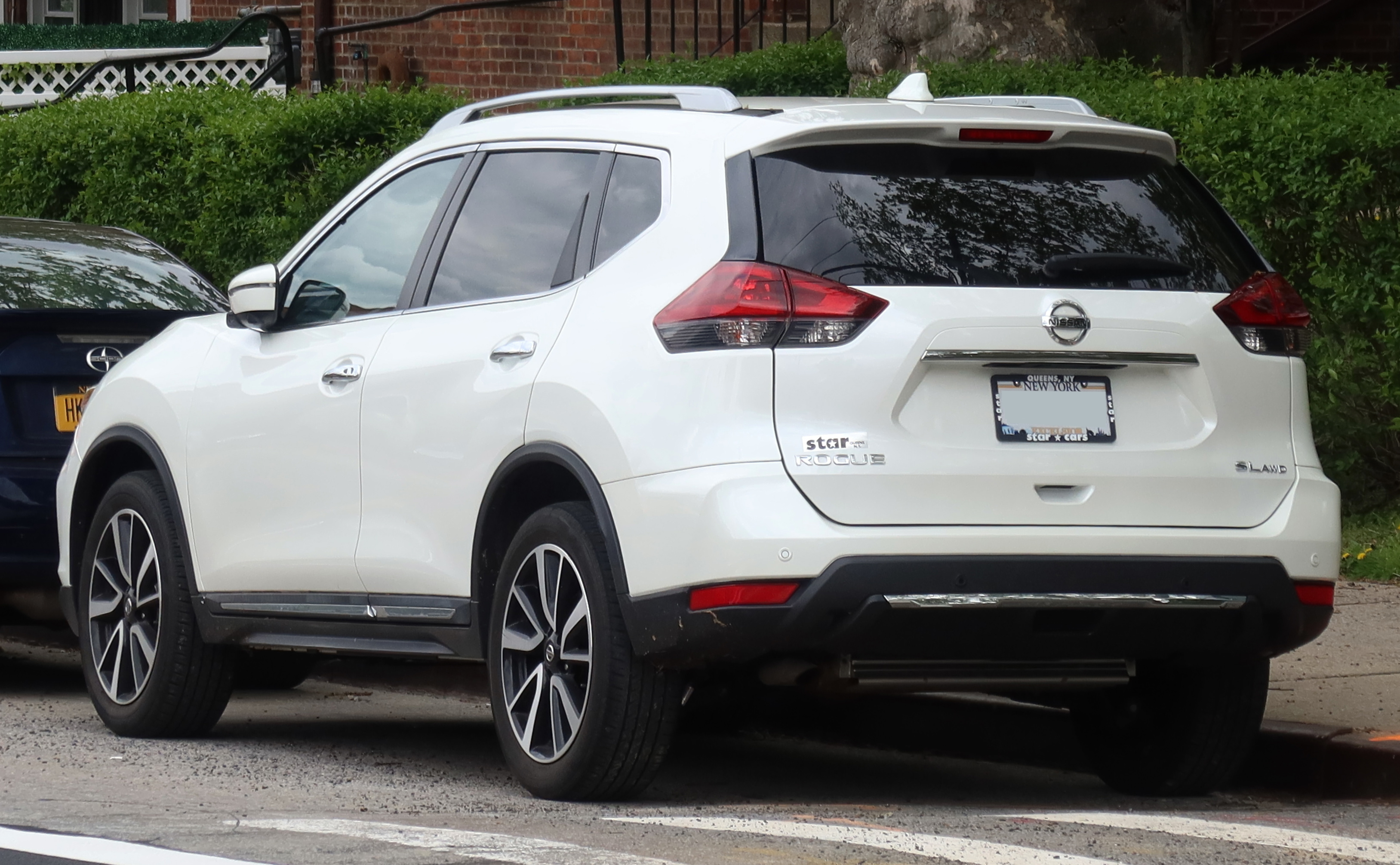
Rear view

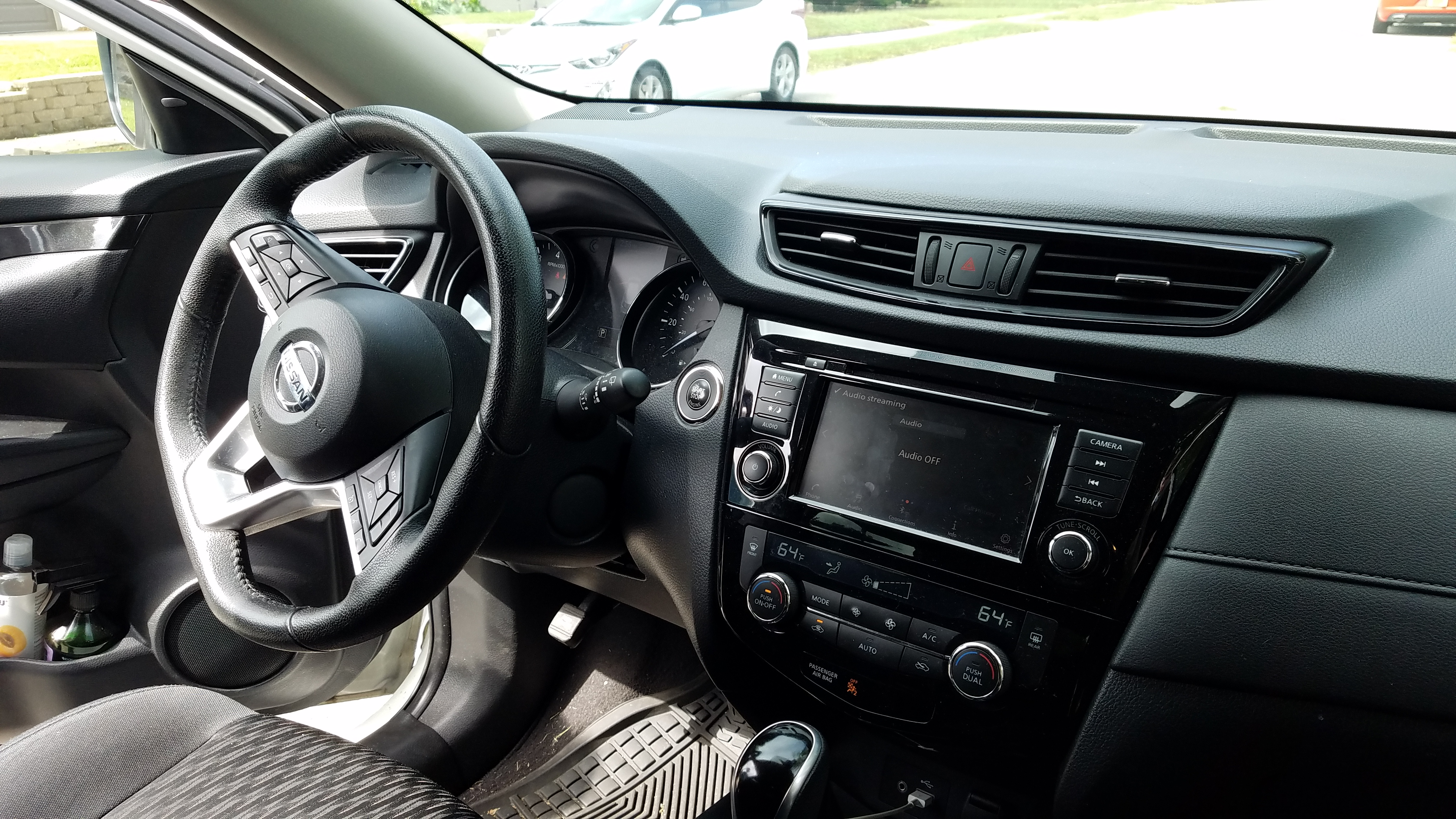
Interior

==== 2018 ====
Automatic Emergency Braking, Blind Spot Warning and Rear Cross Traffic Alert became standard safety features for MY 2018 both in US and Canadian markets. The SV trim received the bigger touch screen radio as standard equipment. ProPILOT Assist is an option on the SL trim. The optional 2-person 3rd row offered on the S and SV was discontinued, it was not available on the SL trim level or with the hybrid powertrain.

=== Rogue Hybrid ===
A hybrid Rogue debuted in January 2017, with limited availability for the 2017 model year. The hybrid features regenerative braking, pure drive hybrid emblems, energy monitor, hybrid battery status, under-floor storage area replacing Divide-N-Hide Cargo System, a 2.0-liter four-cylinder gasoline engine (power: 141 hp and torque: 141 lb-ft) and Xtronic CVT combined with an electric motor (power: 40 hp) and lithium-ion battery, for a combined power of 176 hp. The lithium-ion battery is located below the thick flooring of the under-floor cargo storage area. The Rogue Hybrid is available in two trim levels, SV and SL, but does not offer third-row seating ("Family Package") and Divide-N-Hide Cargo System due to the bulk of the lithium-ion battery. Nissan discontinued the hybrid Rogue starting 2020, citing low interest.

=== Marketing ===
In 2007, the Rogue was featured on the television series Heroes, and in 2014, Nissan became the exclusive automotive partner for the launch of Apple's iTunes Radio, with the campaign theme "Make the Ordinary Extraordinary."

==== Star Wars Edition ====
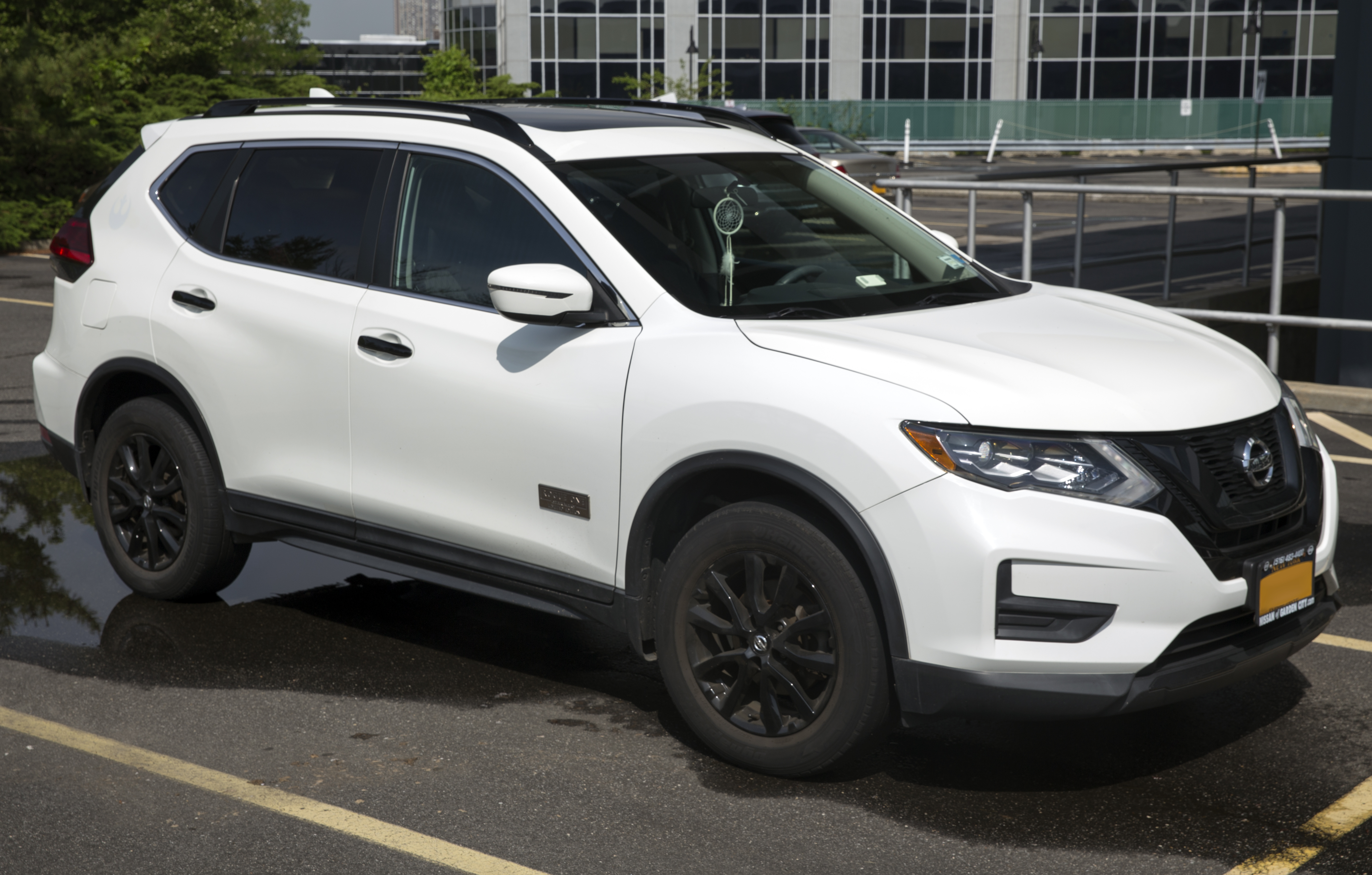
2017 Rogue One Edition

A special edition model known as the "2017 Nissan Rogue: Rogue One Star Wars Limited Edition" inspired by the 2016 film Rogue One was released for the 2017 model year. Available with the glacier white or the magnetic black exterior color and charcoal interior, the Rogue One Edition is only available on the SV trim levels and features a panoramic moonroof, BOSE Audio System, black glossed front grille, black gloss accents on the front and rear bumper, black chrome door handles, black roof rails, black smoked twin LED projector headlights, black wheels, death trooper helmet replica, and Rogue One Edition badging and emblems on the exterior and the interior door sill panels as additional standard features for the Rogue One model versus the regular Nissan Rogue. Only 5,400 units of this limited edition were built.

=== Safety ===
The Rogue holds the Top Safety Pick for IIHS ratings. With the safety features from the first generation, it also includes lane departure warning, frontal collision warning, object detection warning (SL trim only), and a 360 degree backup camera.

The Rogue platform placed well in the Swedish Teknikens Värld Moose evasive maneuver test, managing an 84 km/h (52 mph) entry speed with the Qashqai and an 80 km/h (50 mph) entry speed with the AWD Rogue, scoring amongst and above many high end sports/supercars.

IIHS scores: 2014–2020 Nissan Rogue
Small overlap front (driver)	Good
Small overlap front (passenger)	Acceptable (2019 and newer)
Moderate overlap front	Good
Side impact	Good
Roof strength	Good
Head restraints & seats	Good

The Small Overlap Test, introduced in 2012 by the IIHS simulates a frontal collision on 25% of the driver's side. Since its adoption, the IIHS has noticed several automakers making non-symmetrical modifications to their vehicles, the Rogue being one of them. Another Small Overlap Test was conducted on a number of vehicles including a 2014 Rogue, but was conducted on the passenger side instead. Based on this test, the Rogue would have received a "Marginal" rating if the IIHS were to provide ratings for passenger-side protection. The crash test's intrusion was 10 inches further into the vehicle on the passenger's side than on the driver's side and completely tore off the structural door hinge pillar on the passenger side.

The Rogue was redesigned for the 2014 model year. The redesigned Rogue shares no ratings with the previous design, built since the 2008 model year and given a new name for 2014–15, the Rogue Select. Starting with the 2014 year, the Rogue was awarded Top Safety Pick+ by IIHS (Insurance Institute for Highway Safety).

Nissan vehicles built from 2014 to 2017 were put under a recall as the occupant classification sensor (OCS) would think that an adult in the passenger seat is a child. They recalled over 6 million vehicles for either reprogramming or replacing.

== Third generation (T33; 2021) ==
Third generation
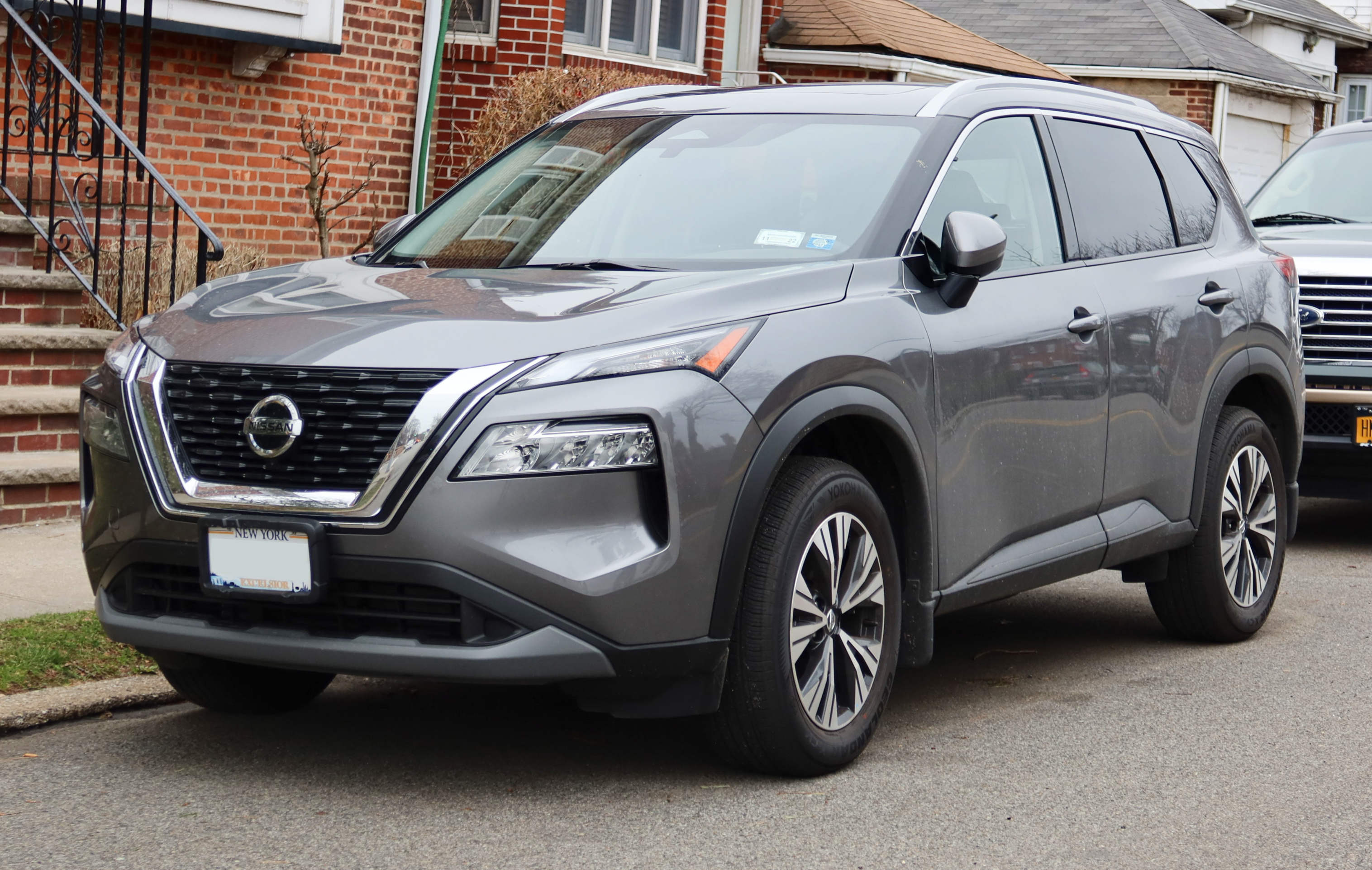
- 2021 Nissan Rogue SV AWD (pre-facelift)

Overview
- Model code: T33
- Also called: Nissan X-Trail
- Production: 2020–2026
- Model years: 2021–2027
- Assembly: United States: Smyrna, Tennessee (Nissan USA); Japan: Kanda, Fukuoka (Nissan Motor Kyushu)
- Designer: Lars Taubert, Takeo Horie and Shinya Momokawa

Body and chassis
- Platform: Renault–Nissan CMF-CD platform
- Related: Nissan Qashqai (J12); Mitsubishi Outlander (fourth generation); Nissan Rogue Plug-in Hybrid

Powertrain
- Engine: Gasoline: 1.5 L KR15DDT I3-T (2022–present); 2.5 L PR25DD I4 (US, 2021; Canada, 2021–2023)
- Transmission: Xtronic CVT

Dimensions
- Wheelbase: 106.5 in (2,705 mm)
- Length: 183 in (4,648 mm)
- Width: 72.4 in (1,839 mm)
- Height: 66.9 in (1,699 mm)
- Curb weight: 3,371–3,494 lb (1,529–1,585 kg)

The third generation Rogue was revealed in North America on 15 June 2020. Production in the United States began on 22 September 2020, and the vehicle arrived at Nissan dealerships in the United States in late October.

It is claimed to be built on a new platform, while the dimensions are similar to its predecessor. It has a more distinctive exterior design, punctuated by a boxier, more squared-off front end and recognizable LED lighting signatures along with two-tone exterior color combinations.

The QR25DE engine used in the previous two generations has been replaced with a new direct-injected PR25DD engine making 181 hp, paired with a CVT. The flagship Platinum model features a 12.3-inch digital gauge cluster, quilted semi-aniline leather upholstery, heated rear seats and wireless Apple CarPlay and Android Auto (late availability) joins the pre-existing S, SV and SL trim levels. The interior has also been revised with an electronic shifter setup and an 8- or 9-inch infotainment screen.

For the 2022 model year, the Rogue received a powertrain update, except for the Canadian base model. The 2.5-liter PR25DD four-cylinder was replaced by a 1.5-liter KR15DDT three-cylinder variable-compression turbocharged (VC-Turbo) engine, which is more powerful with 201 hp (150 kW; 204 PS) and 225 lb⋅ft (305 N⋅m; 31.1 kg⋅m) of torque, while being more efficient. The Xtronic CVT transmission also was given an update; this gave the CVT a 17 percent higher gear ratio spread and reduced the internal friction by 32 percent.

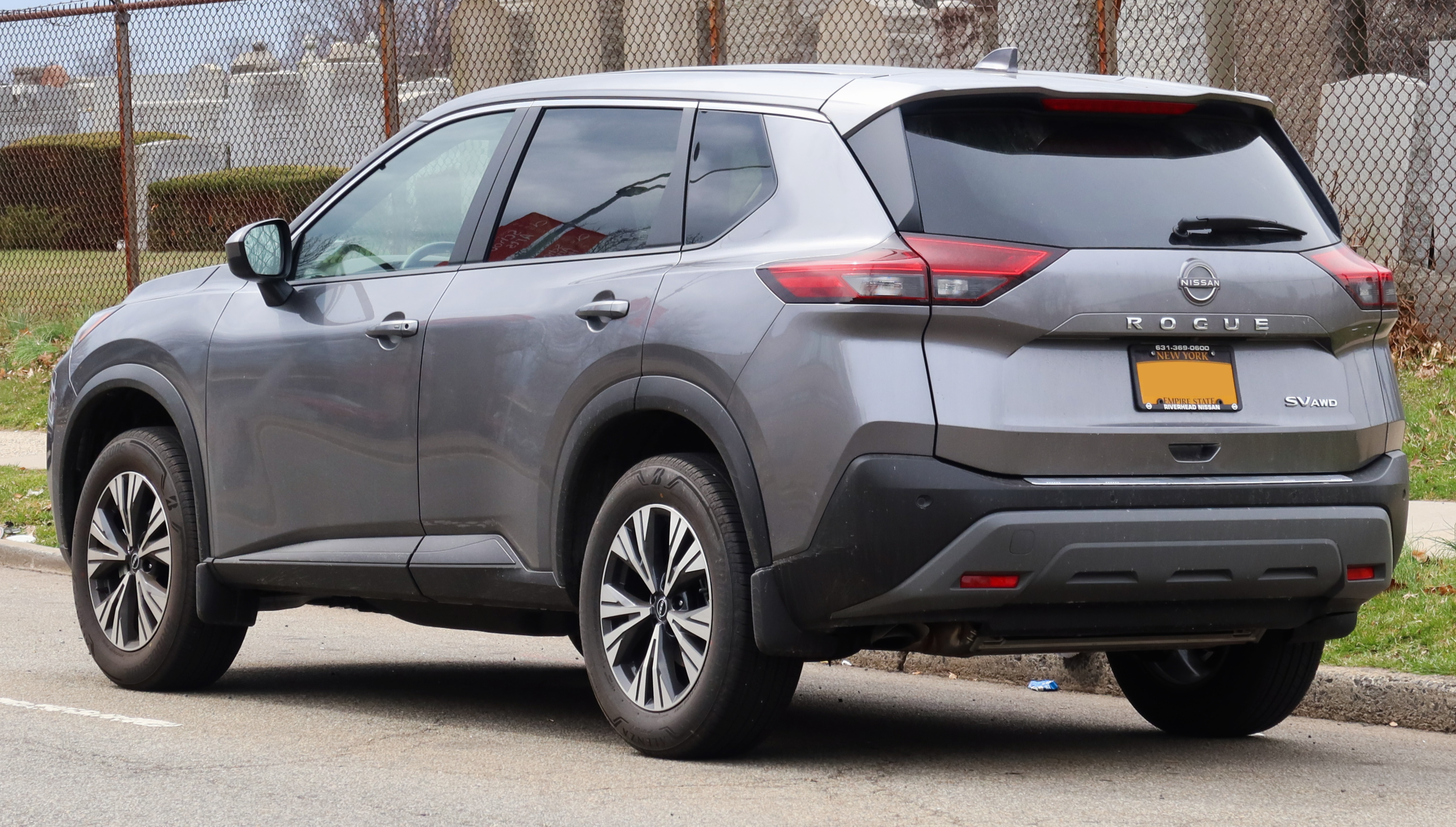
Rear view (pre-facelift)

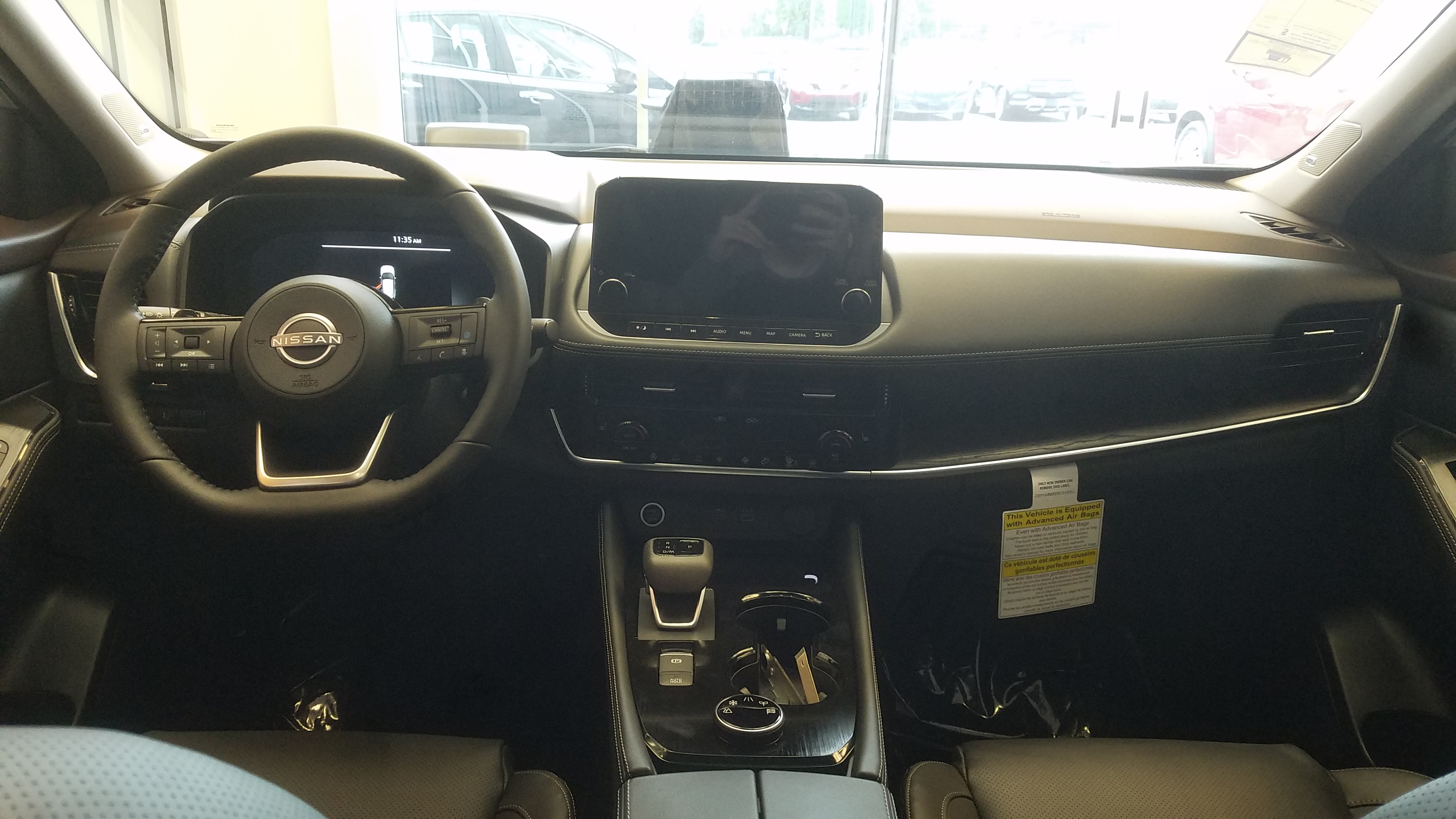
Interior (pre-facelift)

=== 2024 refresh ===
The Rogue facelift was unveiled on 16 October 2023, for the 2024 model year. It features a redesigned front fascia and rear fascia. The interior gets a 12.3-inch touchscreen with Google Built-In for the SL and Platinum models. The 2.5-liter PR25DD four-cylinder was fully dropped in Canada in favor of the 1.5-liter KR15DDT three-cylinder.

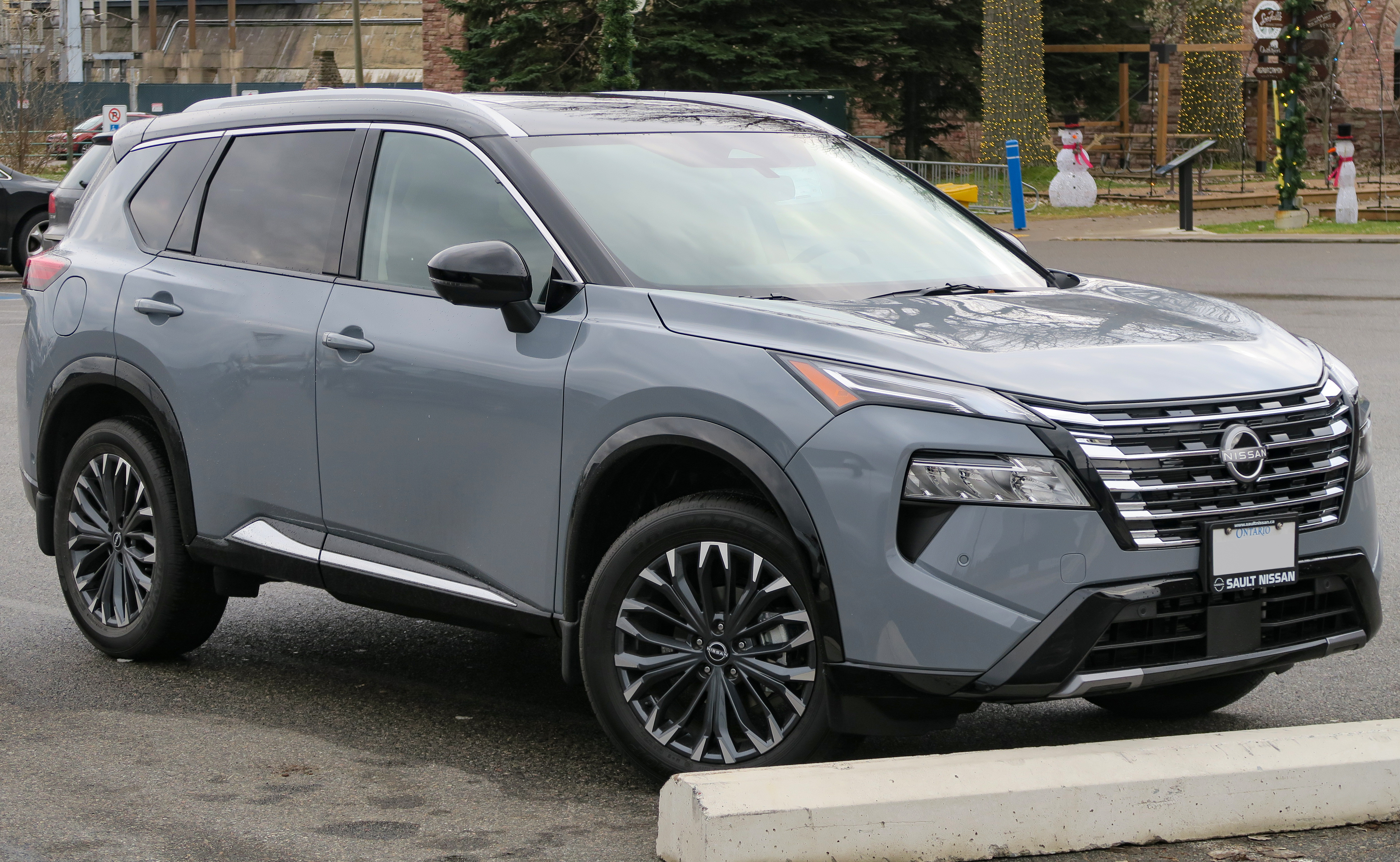
2026 Rogue (facelift)

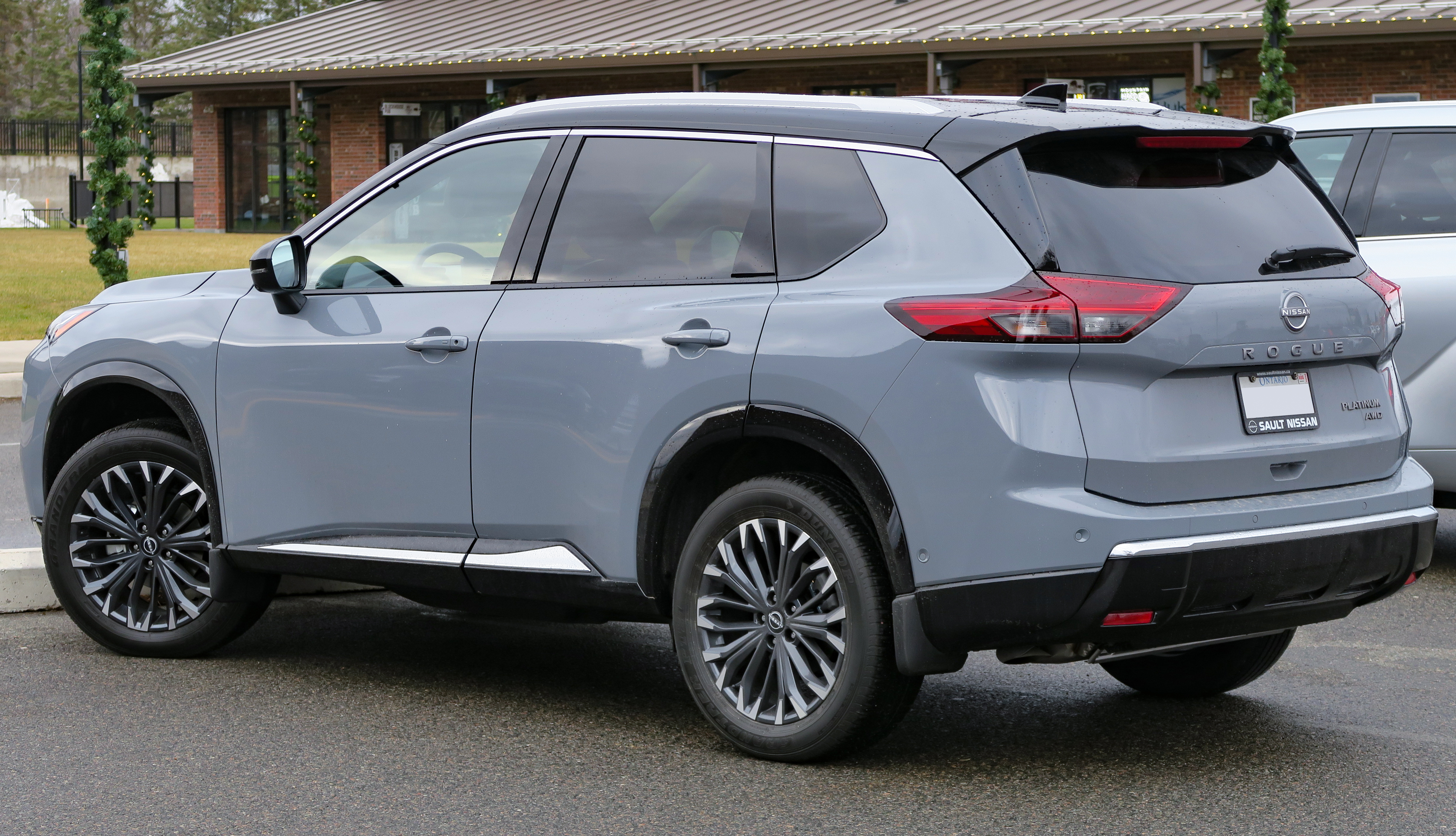
Rear view

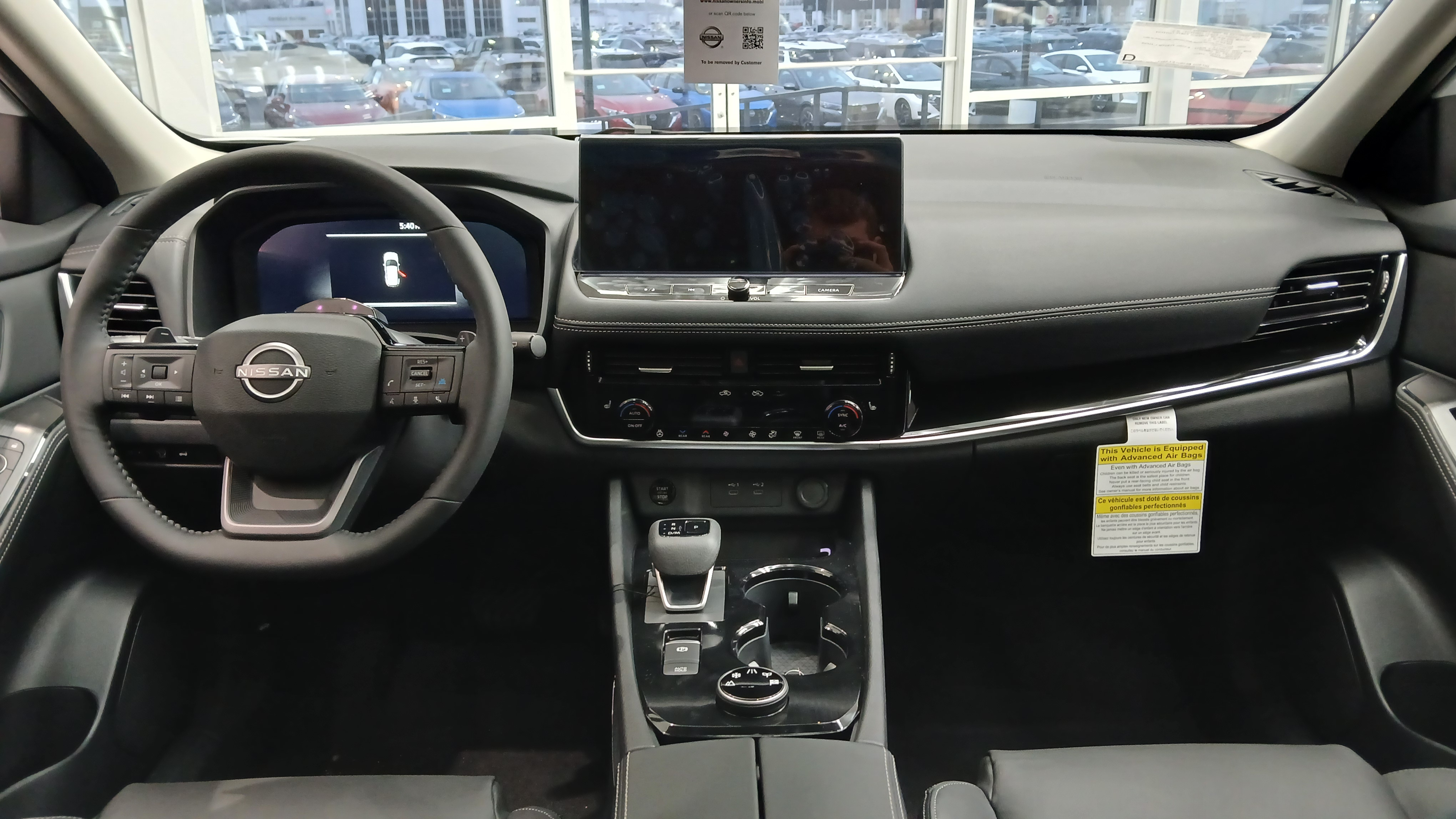
Interior

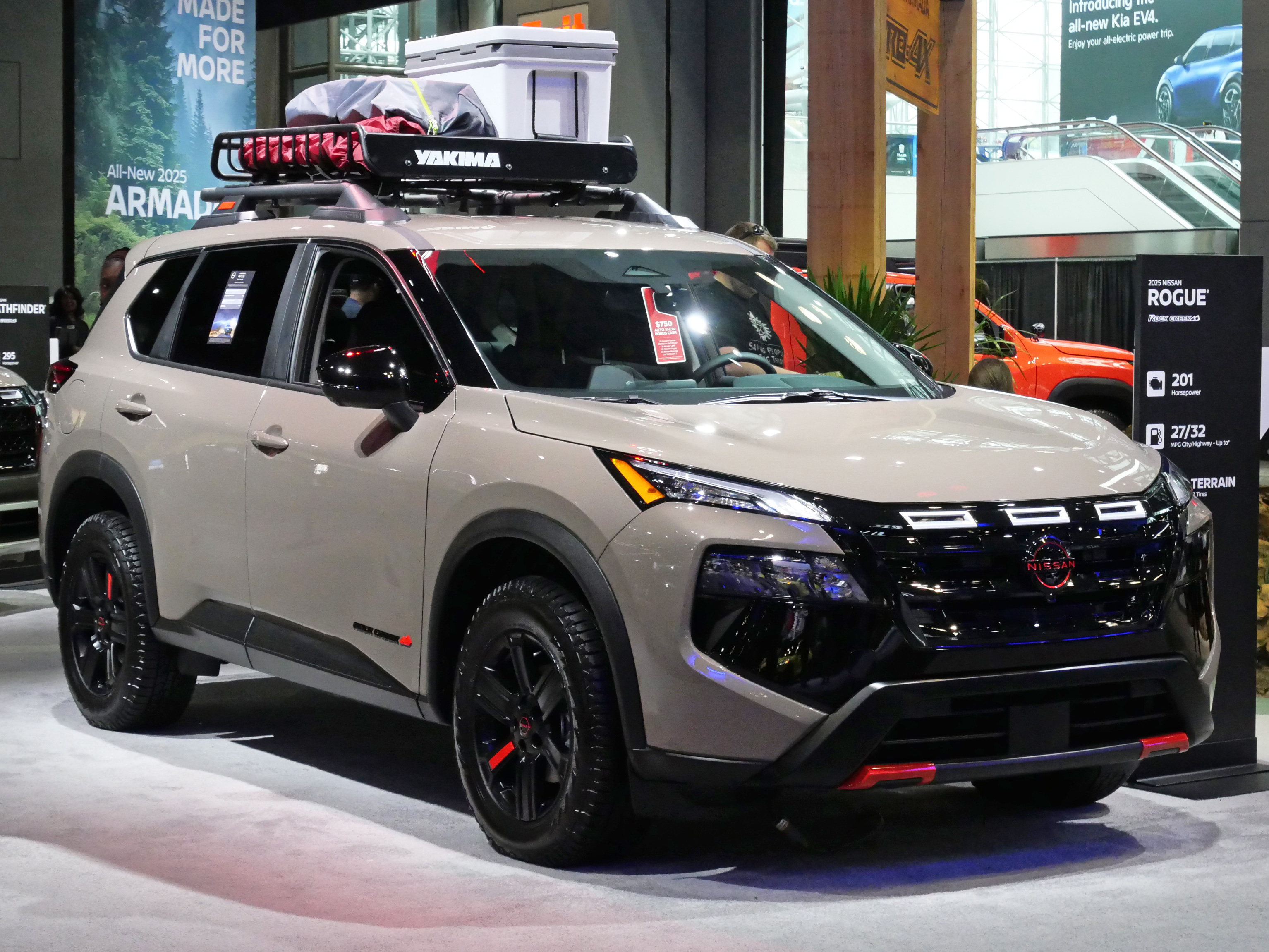
2025 Rogue Rock Creek (front)

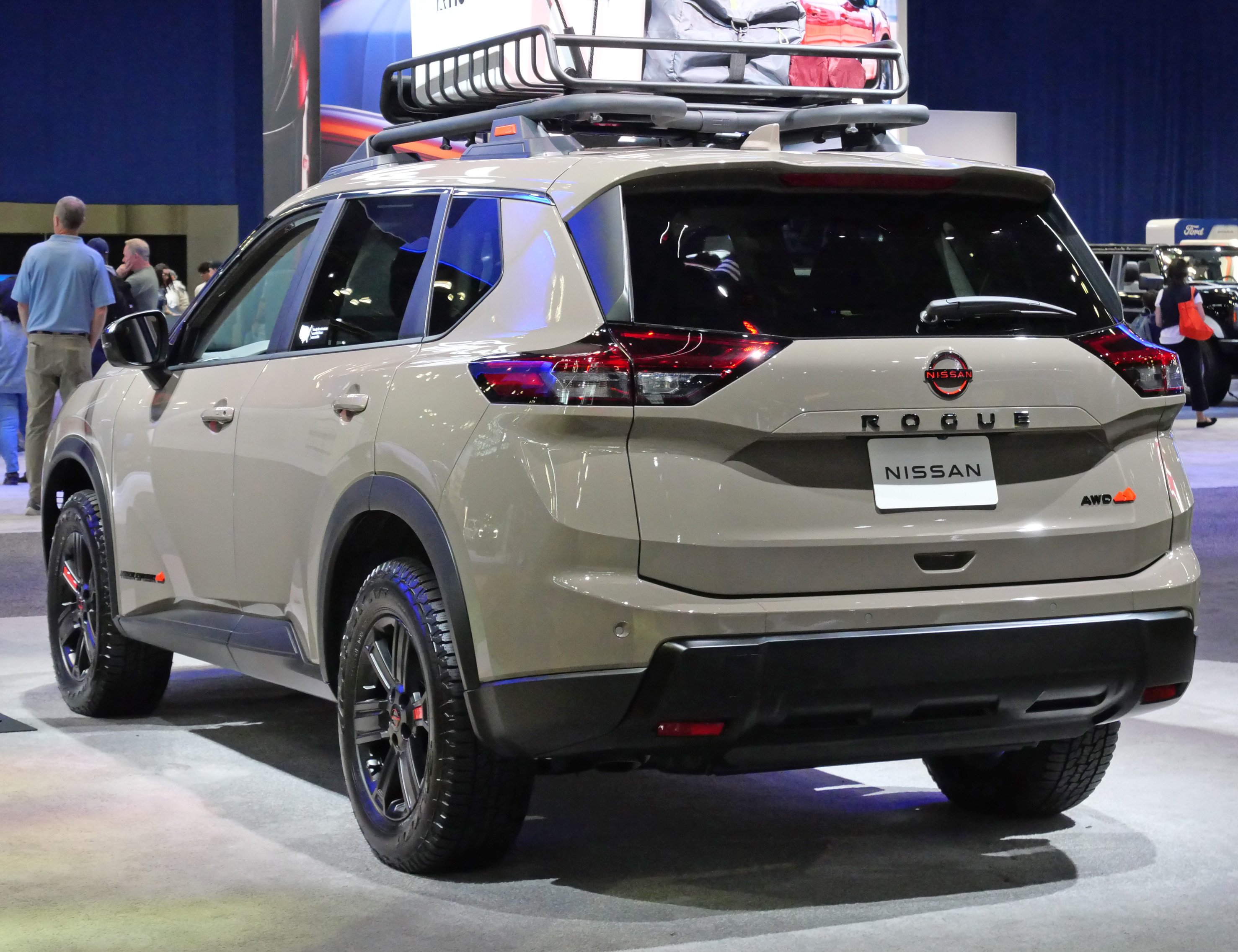
2025 Rogue Rock Creek (rear)

In March 2025, Motor Trend magazine ranked the 2025 Rogue first on its list of the best compact SUVs for 2025.

=== KR15DDT engine NHTSA investigation ===
On December 13, 2023, the NHTSA opened an investigation into customer complaints of engine failure in the Nissan's KR15DDT and KR20DDET engines, the former being used since the Nissan Rogue update in 2022. The complaints allege engine failure, loss of motive power, engine knock, or noise and/or metal chunks and shavings being found in the oil pan of vehicles with these engines. The cause appears to be seizures and damages to the main bearings and L-links. Nissan stated that they are attempting to address these failures by changing their manufacturing process. On June 27, 2025, Nissan issued safety recall 25V437 covering certain 2021–2024 Rogue vehicles equipped with the 1.5-liter VC-Turbo (KR15DDT) to address potential bearing-related engine damage.

== Fourth generation (T34; 2027) ==
Fourth generation

Overview
- Model code: T34
- Also called: Nissan X-Trail
- Production: 2026 (to commence)
- Model years: 2027
- Assembly: Japan: Kanda, Fukuoka (Nissan Motor Kyushu)

Body and chassis
- Layout: Front-engine, dual-motor, all-wheel-drive
- Platform: Renault–Nissan CMF-CD platform

Powertrain
- Engine: Gasoline hybrid: 1.5 L ZR15DDTe e-Power I3 turbo
- Electric motor: Permanent magnet synchronous
- Hybrid drivetrain: Series
- Battery: 1.67 kWh lithium-ion

Dimensions
- Wheelbase: 106.5 in (2,705 mm)
- Length: 183.1 in (4,651 mm)
- Width: 72.8 in (1,849 mm)
- Height: 67.7 in (1,720 mm)
- Curb weight: 4,065–4,167 lb (1,844–1,890 kg)

The fourth-generation Rogue was unveiled alongside the next-generation Juke on April 13, 2026 for the 2027 model year. It is the first Rogue to be available with Nissan's e-Power series hybrid drivetrain, as well as being the first e-Power model to go on sale in the US. It was fully announced for the North American market on September 21, 2026.

Despite having almost unchanged dimensions to its predecessor, the fourth-generation Rogue features a redesigned exterior. A modernized version of Nissan's V-motion grille design, which includes hexagonal elements arranged in alternating twos and threes, referencing the Japanese words for two ("ni") and three ("san") combining to read "Nissan". The side features angular creases and a D-pillar shaped to resemble Mount Fuji, with additional two-three motifs in the window that evokes the cloud formations there. The rear features a full-width light bar.

The interior is also fully redesigned, using a new two-spoke steering wheel and dual 14.3-inch driver and central touchscreen displays which uses a Google-based OS that integrates Google Maps, Gemini, and the Play Store. There are also new 15 W magnetic wireless chargers that support Qi2 wireless charging. Unlike other recent Nissan models, the Rogue uses physical HVAC controls instead of those that are either capacitive touch-based or fully within the display. Trunk space ranges from 31 cu ft (878 L) to 66 cu ft (1,870 L) The front seats use Nissan's Zero Gravity design; a certain quilting pattern inspired by high-end down jackets is used across the interior in the top Platinum trim. For the ease of accessibility, there are 5 LATCH anchors in the second row, while the doors can be opened at up to 90 degeres.

An upgraded version of Nissan's "ProPilot Assist" automated driving feature is used, with improved software and more accurate cameras with the addition of a radar sensor.

== Nameplate use for other models ==
=== Rogue Sport ===
A version of the global Qashqai was released in the US market for the 2017 model year as the Rogue Sport. Imported from Kyushu, Japan, the vehicle serves customers interested in a smaller, lower price-point Rogue after the discontinuation of the previous-generation Rogue Select. The Rogue Sport is slightly smaller than the regular Rogue and comes with a 2.0-liter direct-injected inline-four engine rated 141 hp (105 kW) at 6000 rpm and 147 lb⋅ft (199 N⋅m) of torque at 4400 rpm. Compared with the Rogue, the Rogue Sport is 12 inches shorter overall, 0.4 inches lower and has a two-inch shorter wheelbase. Trim levels include S, SV and SL with FWD or AWD.

For the 2020 model year, the Rogue Sport received a minor facelift.

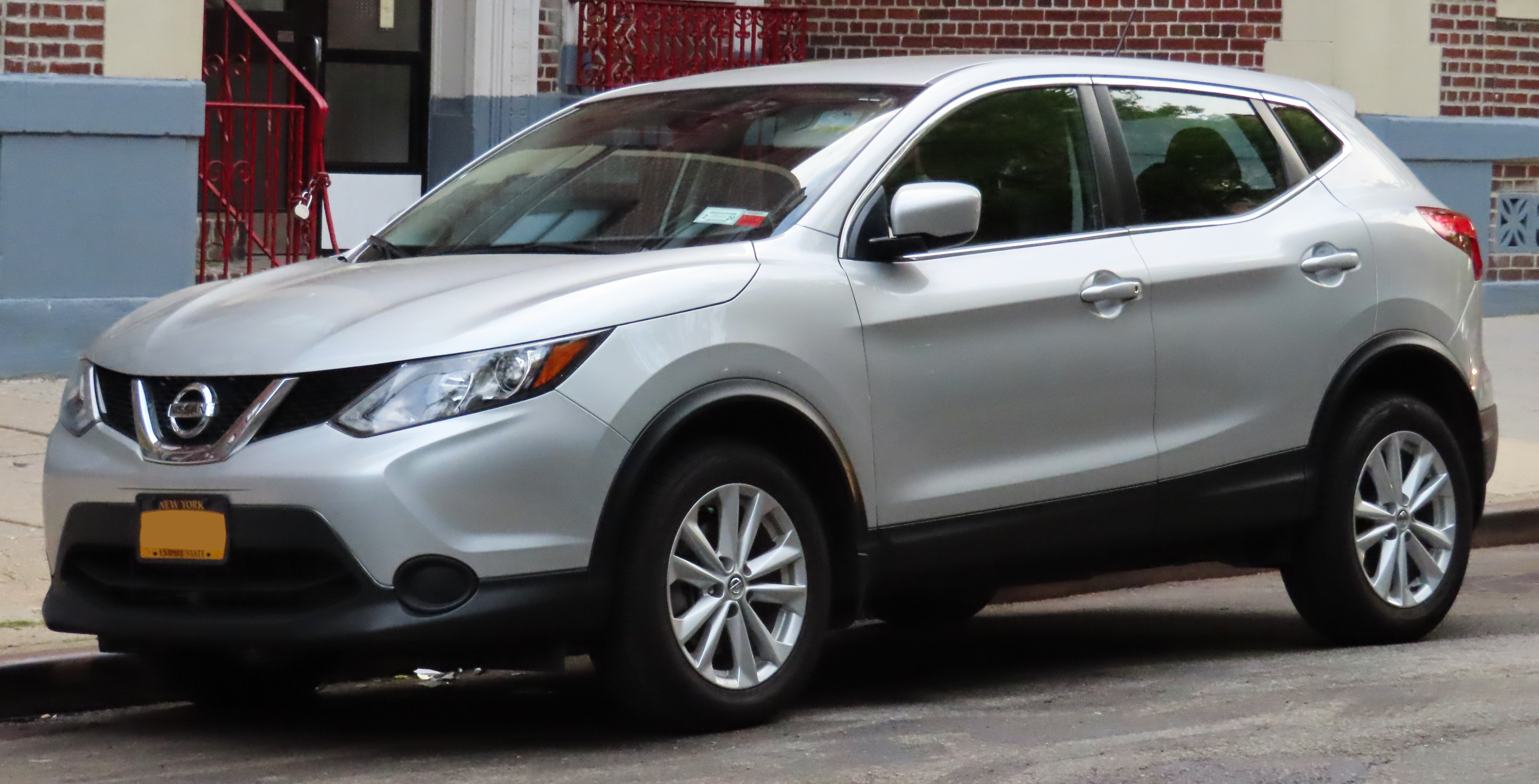
2017 Nissan Rogue Sport

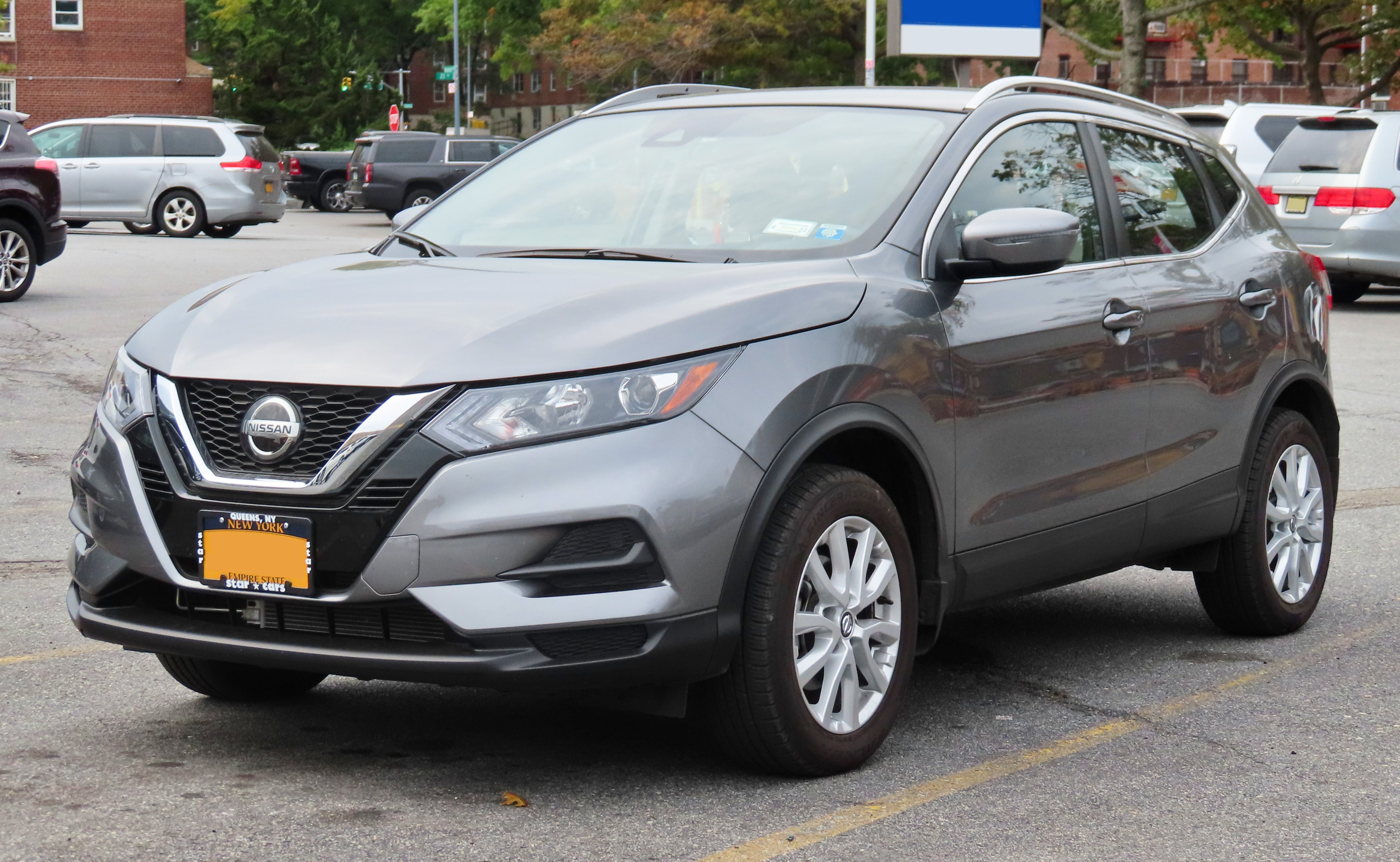
2020 Nissan Rogue Sport

=== Rogue Plug-in Hybrid (2026) ===
On 17 November 2025, Nissan announced a plug-in hybrid variant of the Rogue, which is a rebadged fourth-generation Mitsubishi Outlander PHEV. Debuted at the 2025 LA Auto Show. It went on sale in North America in early 2026 for the 2026 model year. It is available in either SL or Platinum trim levels with all-wheel drive as standard. The Rogue Plug-in Hybrid is intended to be a stop-gap model before the launch of the fourth-generation 2027 Nissan Rogue which will feature an available e-Power hybrid drivetrain. The Rogue Plug-in Hybrid will be discontinued for the 2027 model year.

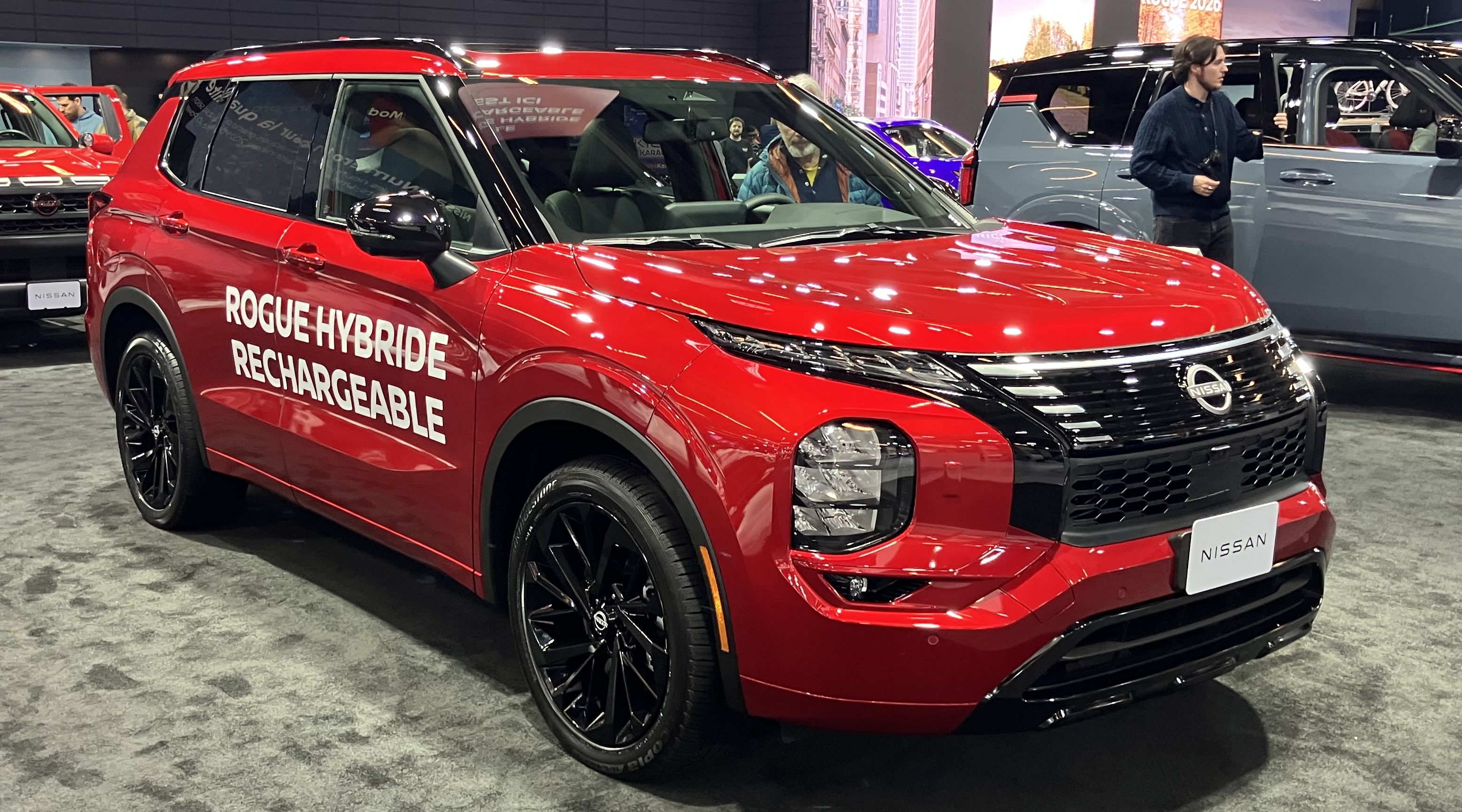
Nissan Rogue PHEV

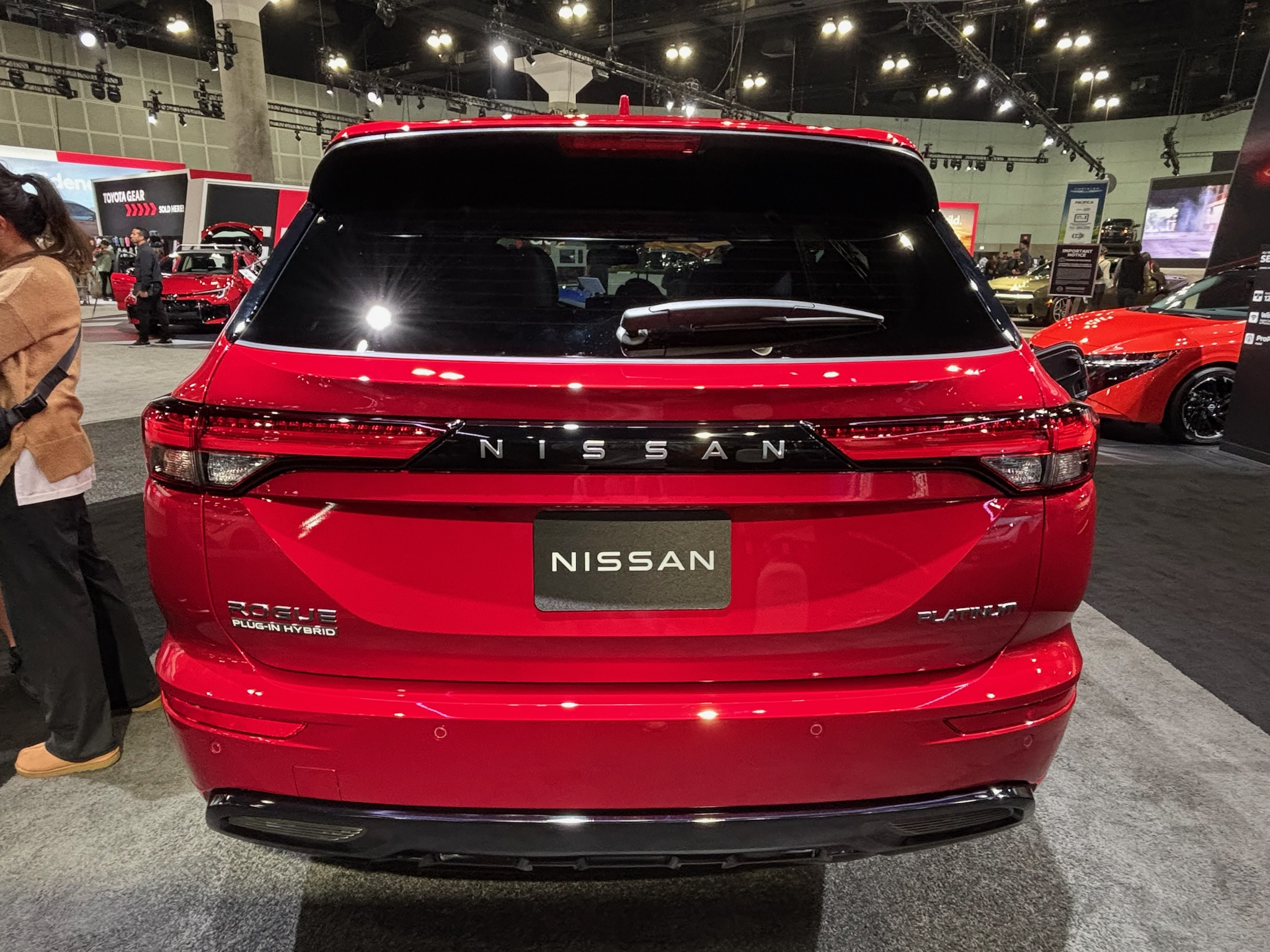
Rear View

== Sales ==
Calendar year	U.S.	Canada
2007	17,808	7,503
2008	75,053	13,163
2009	77,222	11,056
2010	99,515	13,199
2011	124,543	14,191
2012	142,349	14,329
2013	162,751	16,878
2014	199,199	28,827
2015	287,190	35,841
2016	329,904	40,055
2017	403,465	43,418
2018	412,110	41,167
2019	350,447	37,530
2020	227,935	25,998
2021	285,602	29,926
2022	186,480	20,144
2023	271,458	26,665
2024	245,724	32,737
2025	217,896	36,034

From 2016, the United States sales figures of the Rogue included the smaller Rogue Sport.
