= Ishizukayama Kofun =

Burial mound in Fukuoka Prefecture, Japan

Ishiyamazuka Kofun
- 石塚山古墳 (Japanese)
- Ishiyamazuka Kofun Ishizukayama Kofun (Japan)
- Interactive map of Ishiyamazuka Kofun
- 33°46′31.4″N 130°58′48.0″E
- Type: Kofun
- Periods: Kofun period
- Location: Kanda, Fukuoka, Japan
- Region: Kyushu

History
- Built: c.4th century

Site notes
- Public access: Yes (no facilities)

The Ishiyamazuka Kofun (石塚山古墳) is a Kofun period burial mound, located in the Tamiku neighborhood of the town of Kanda, Miyako District, Fukuoka Prefecture Japan. The tumulus was designated a National Historic Site of Japan in 1985. Along with the Goshoyama Kofun (also located in Kanda) it is one of the oldest and largest burial mounds in the Buzen region, and is estimated to have been constructed in the early Kofun period.

== Overview ==
The Ishiyamazuka Kofun is a zenpō-kōen-fun (前方後円墳), which is shaped like a keyhole, having one square end and one circular end, when viewed from above. It is located on a low hill overlooking the Gulf of Suo on the Seto Inland Sea in eastern Fukuoka Prefecture. It was very close to the coastline at that time, with the front facing toward the sea. The surrounding area has been slightly carved out, and the total length is estimated to be approximately 130 meters, and the height of the circular three-tier posterior portion part is approximately 17 meters with a diameter of 70 meters. This surface was leveled when a Shinto shrine was built on top of the mound in the Edo period. The anterior rectangular portion extends long and narrow from the constriction and widens slightly at the tip, which is a style consistent with the beginning of the 4th century. The tumulus has fukiishi, but existence of haniwa has not been confirmed.

The pit-style stone burial chamber was opened in 1796, but was subsequently filled-in. Surviving grave goods include seven bronze mirrors in six different designs, a large iron sword with ring pommel, and a bronze arrowhead. These artifacts are kept at the Ubara Shrine. However, according to the records of the Ogasawara clan, who were daimyō of Kokura Domain at the time, a total of eleven bronze mirrors had been excavated, and the records of Ubara Shrine state that a total of 14 bronze mirrors had been donated to the shrine. The whereabouts of these additional mirrors in unknown. The existing mirrors are identical to those excavated from the Bizen Kurumazuka Kofun in Okayama Prefecture and the Tsubai Ōtsukayama Kofun in Kyoto Prefecture. The surviving grave goods from this tumulus were collectively designated a National Important Cultural Property in 1953. Re-excavation was carried out in 1987, and it was found that the burial chamber was severely damaged. During the excavations at this time, items such as a thin wire type beast band mirror piece, an amber magatama, a jasper bead, and a small leather-bound helmet piece were unearthed.

The tumulus is approximately 15-minutes on foot from Kanda Station on the JR Kyushu Nippō Main Line.

== See also ==
- List of Historic Sites of Japan (Fukuoka)
