= Goshoyama Kofun =

- 御所山古墳 (Japanese)
- Goshoyama Kofun Goshoyama Kofun (Japan)
- 33°45′30.64″N 130°58′50.68″E
- Type: Kofun
- Periods: Kofun period
- Location: Kanda, Fukuoka, Japan
- Region: Kyushu

History
- Built: c.5th century

Site notes
- Public access: Yes (no facilities)
- National Historic Site of Japan

The Goshoyama Kofun (御所山古墳) is a Kofun period burial mound, located in the Yohara neighborhood of the town of Kanda, Miyako District, Fukuoka Prefecture Japan. The tumulus was designated a National Historic Site of Japan in 1936, with the area under protection expanded in 2012, 2020 and 2022. Along with the Ishizukayama Kofun (also located in Kanda) it is one of the largest burial mounds in the Buzen region, and is estimated to have been constructed in the mid-late Kofun period.

== Overview ==
The Goshoyama Kofun is a zenpō-kōen-fun (前方後円墳), which is shaped like a keyhole, having one square end and one circular end, when viewed from above. It is located on a low hill overlooking the Gulf of Suo on the Seto Inland Sea in eastern Fukuoka Prefecture. It is known that the burial chamber was opened in 1820, but a proper archaeological excavations was not conducted until 2007 to 2015. The tumulus retains its original appearance, and the five-meter wide moat surrounding it is filled with water. The total length of the tumulus is 119 meters; the width of the anterior rectangular portion is 82 meters, and the diameter of the circular posterior portion is 73 meters, and there are cutouts on both sides of the constriction between the anterior and posterior portions. The tumulus was built in three stages, and there are fukiishi and haniwa. The total length including the surrounding embankment and moat is about 140 meters. The horizontal-entry stone burial chamber in the posterior circular part has a narrow passageway at the entrance, orientated to the north. The burial chamber is 4.7 by three meters, with stone barrier dividing the floors into several sections for multiple burials. The inner surface was painted with vermillion pigment. Grave goods found inside the burial chamber included a bronze mirror, magatama, pipe beads, and gilt-bronze horse fittings, possibly originating from the Asian mainland. These artifacts are now in the collection of the Imperial Household Agency. It is believed that the tumulus was constructed in the late 5th century, based on the structure, grave goods, and style of haniwa. It is speculated from the size of the tumulus that this was the graves of the Kuni no miyatsuko of ancient Buzen Province.

The tumulus is approximately ten minutes by car from Kanda Station on the JR Kyushu Nippō Main Line. The top of the kofun is now occupied by a Shinto shrine.

== See also ==
- List of Historic Sites of Japan (Fukuoka)
