= Japan National Route 201 =

Road in Fukuoka prefecture, Japan

National Route 201
- 国道201号
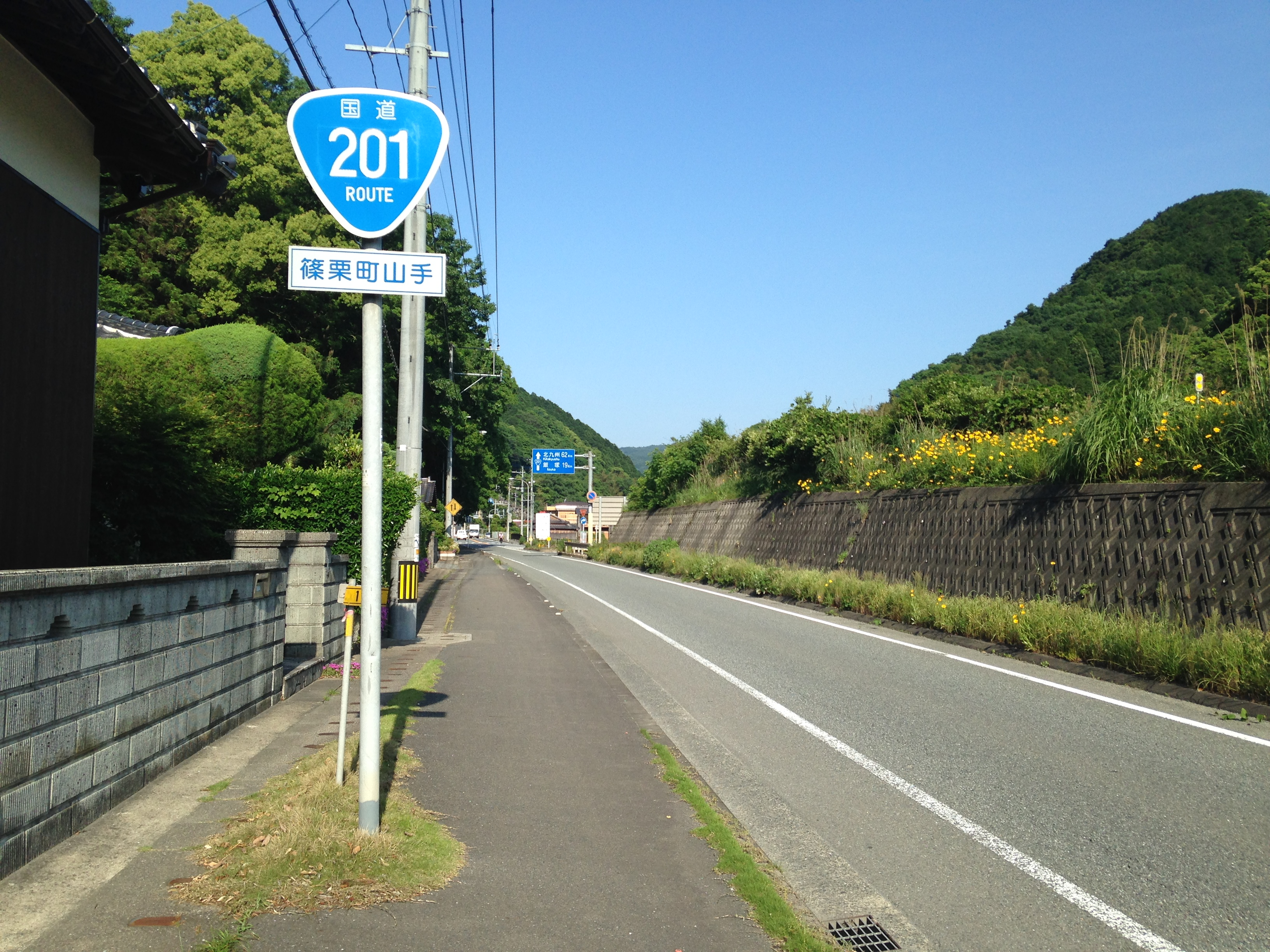

Route information
- Length: 64.5 km (40.1 mi)
- Existed: 18 May 1953–present

Major junctions
- West end: National Route 3 in Higashi-ku, Fukuoka
- East end: National Route 10 Kanda, Fukuoka

Location
- Country: Japan

Highway system
- National highways of Japan; Expressways of Japan
← National Route 200	→ National Route 202

National Route 201 is a national highway of Japan connecting Higashi-ku, Fukuoka and Kanda, Fukuoka in Japan, with a total length of 64.5 km (40.08 mi).
