= Nishinippon Institute of Technology =

Private university

Coordinates: 33.7537°N 130.9732°E

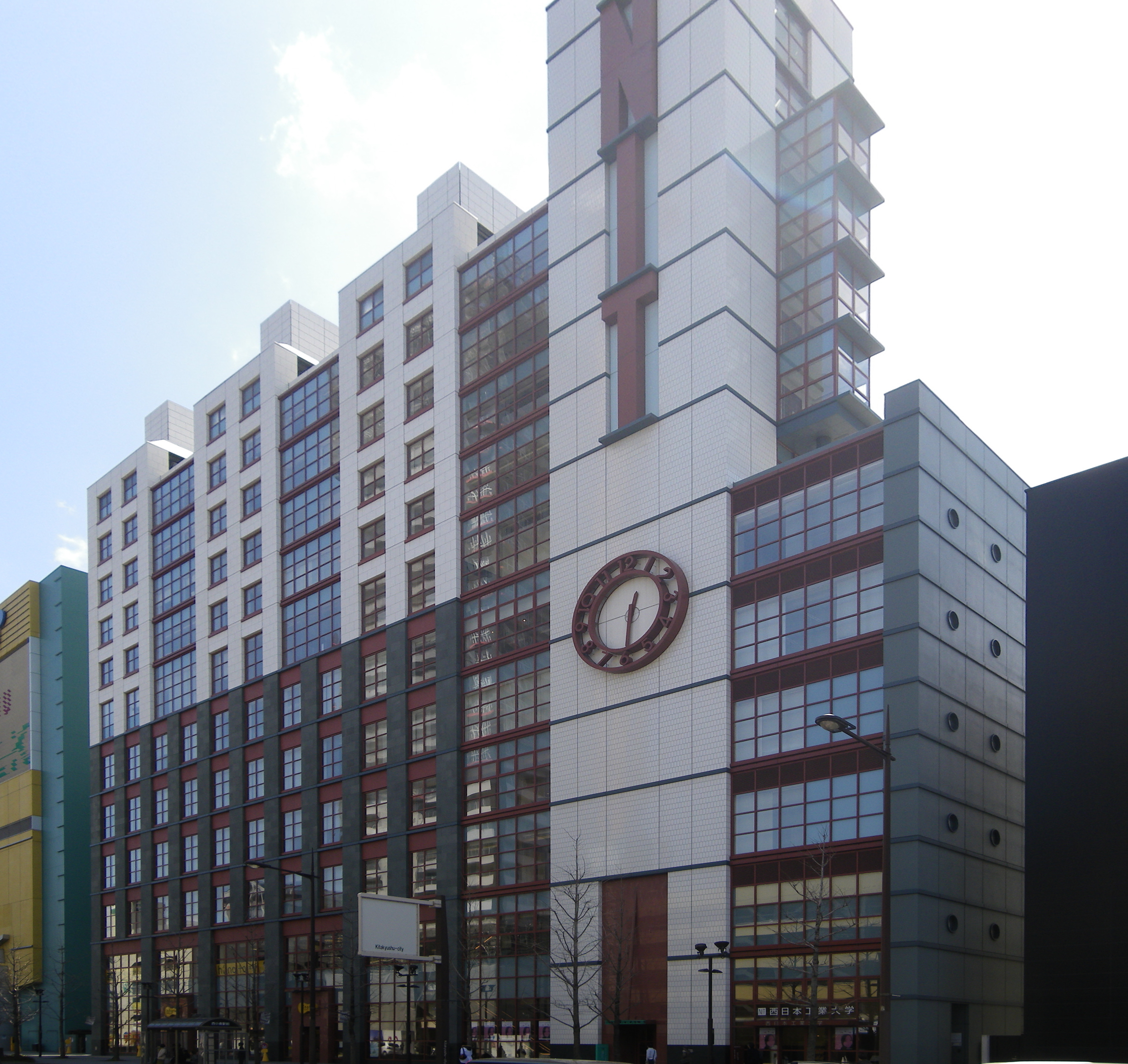
Nishinippon Institute of Technology Kokura campus

Nishinippon Institute of Technology (西日本工業大学, Nishinihon kogyo daigaku) is a private university in the town of Kanda, Fukuoka, Japan with campus locations in Kanda and also in city of Kokurakita-ku, Kitakyūshū. It was established in 1967.
