= Kanda, Fukuoka =

Kanda 苅田町
- Town
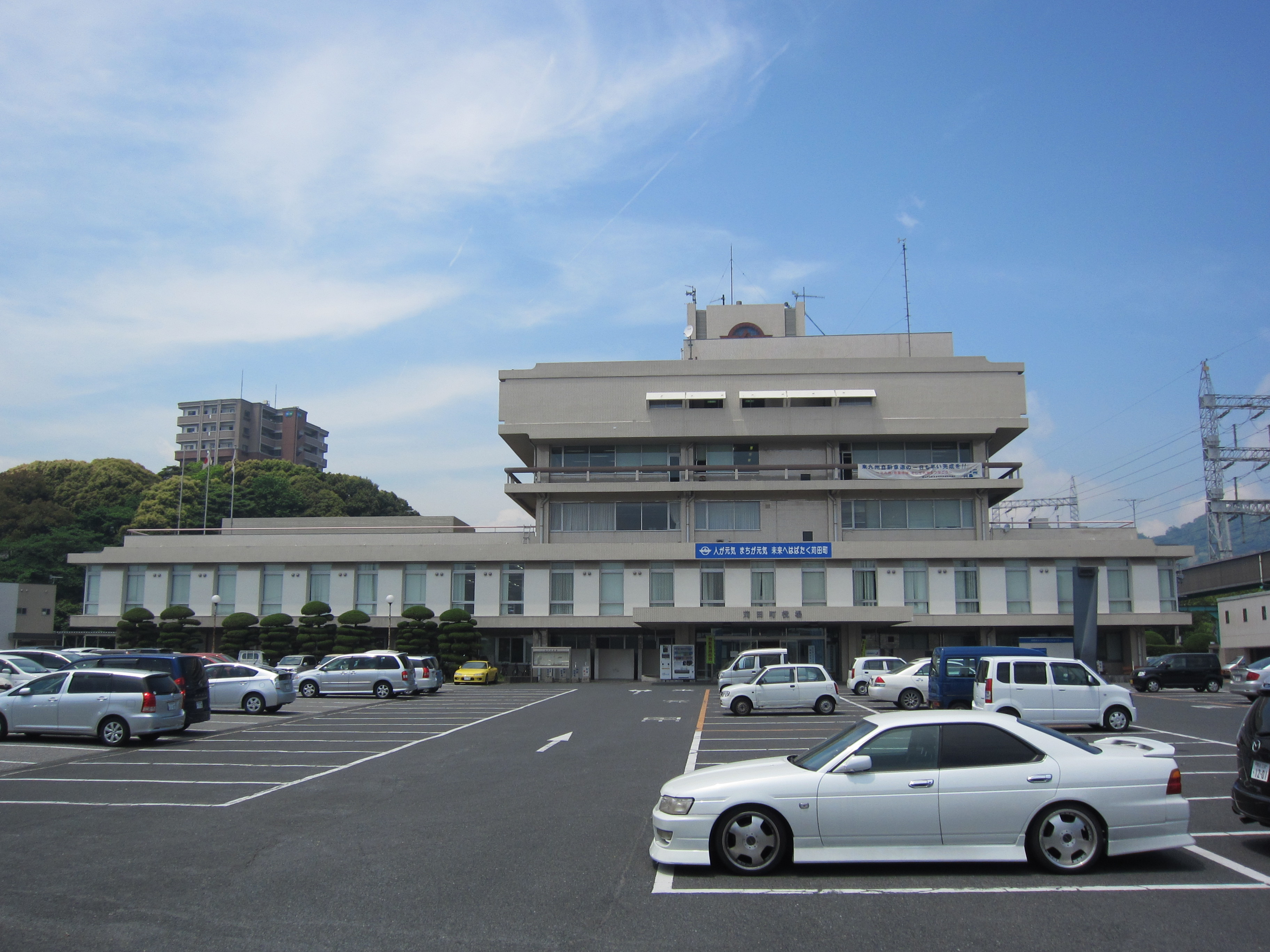
- Kanda Town Hall

- Flag Emblem
- Interactive map of Kanda
- Location in Japan Kanda (Fukuoka Prefecture) Kanda (Kitakyushu)
- Coordinates: 33°46′33″N 130°58′50″E
- Country: Japan
- Region: Kyushu
- Prefecture: Fukuoka
- District: Miyako

Area
  - Total: 48.98 km^{2} (18.91 sq mi)

Population (April 30, 2024)
  - Total: 37,626
  - Density: 768.2/km^{2} (1,990/sq mi)
- Time zone: UTC+09:00 (JST)
- City hall address: 1-19-1 Fukucho, Kanda-cho, Miyako-gun, Fukuoka-ken 800-0392
- Website: Official website
- Symbols
- Flower: Pansy
- Tree: Cinnamomum camphora

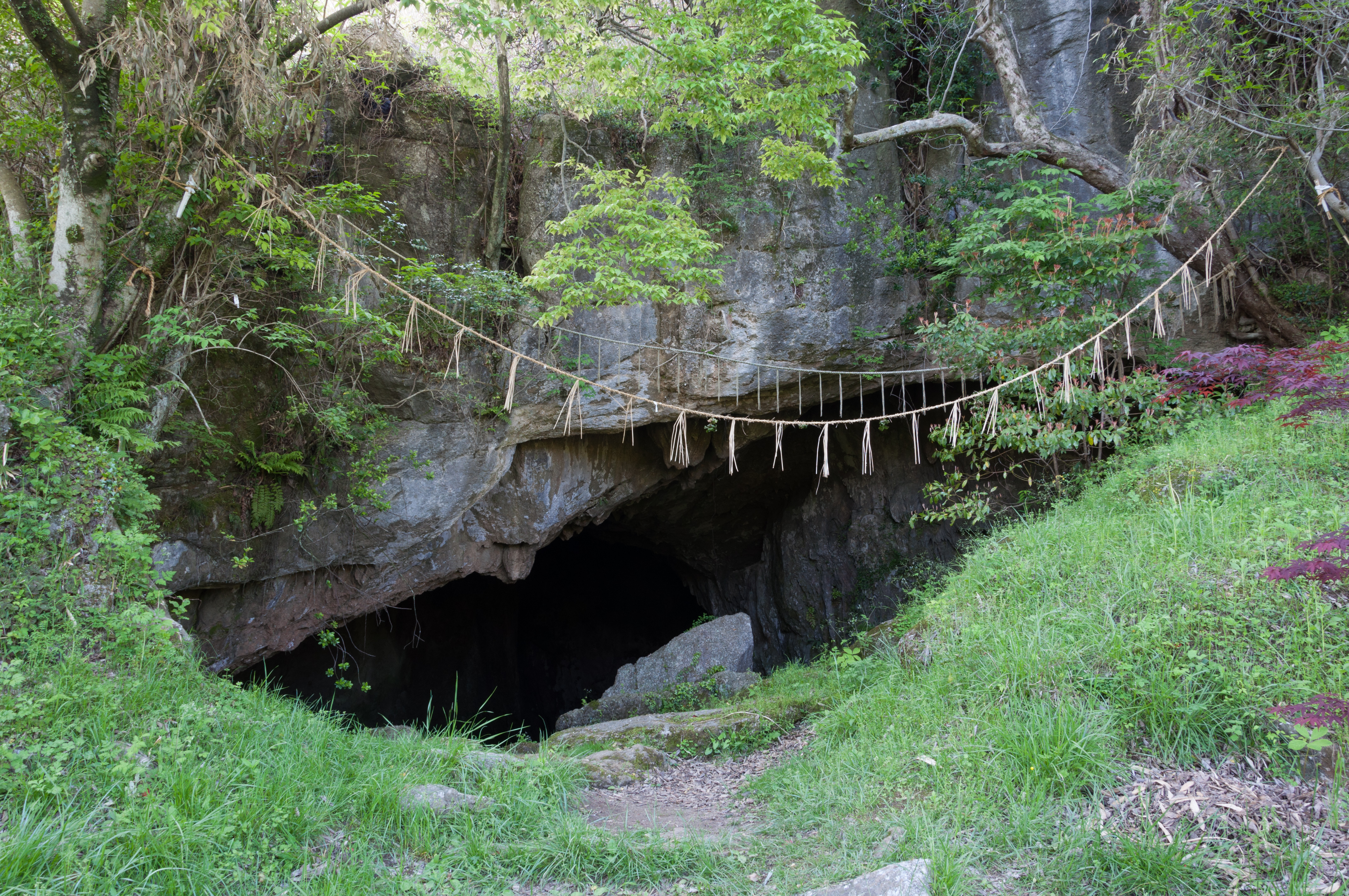
Seiryu Cave

Kanda (苅田町, Kanda-machi) is a town located in Miyako District, Fukuoka Prefecture, Japan. As of 30 April 2024, the town had an estimated population of 37,626 in 18,877 households, and a population density of 770 persons per km^{2}. The total area of the town is 48.98 km^{2} (18.91 sq mi).

== Geography ==
Kanda is located in northeastern Fukuoka Prefecture. It is bordered by the Gulf of Suo on the Seto Inland Sea, and to the west by the Hiraodai, which is known for its karst plateau. The southern area adjacent to Yukuhashi City is a lush rural area on the Miyako Plain.

=== Neighboring municipalities ===
Fukuoka Prefecture

- Kitakyushu
- Yukuhashi

=== Climate ===
Kanda has a humid subtropical climate (Köppen Cfa) characterized by warm summers and cool winters with light to no snowfall. The average annual temperature in Kanda is 15.8 °C. The average annual rainfall is 1663 mm with September as the wettest month. The temperatures are highest on average in August, at around 26.8 °C, and lowest in January, at around 5.2 °C.

=== Demographics ===
Per Japanese census data, the population of Kanda has been steadily increasing since the 1950s.

Historical population
Year	Pop.	±%
1950	13,731	—
1960	18,796	+36.9%
1970	22,430	+19.3%
1980	26,058	+16.2%
1990	32,850	+26.1%
2000	34,931	+6.3%
2010	35,827	+2.6%
2020	37,309	+4.1%

== History ==
The area of Kanda was part of ancient Buzen Province. During the Edo Period, the area was part of the holdings of Kokura Domain. The village of Kanda within Miyako District, Fukuoka was established on May 1, 1889, with the creation of the modern municipalities system. Kanda was raised to town status on August 1, 1924. Kanda annexed neighboring the villages of Obase and Shirakawa on January 1, 1955.

== Government ==
Kanda has a mayor-council form of government with a directly elected mayor and a unicameral town council of 11 members. Miyako, collectively with the town of Kanda contributes one member to the Fukuoka Prefectural Assembly. In terms of national politics, the town is part of the Fukuoka 11th district of the lower house of the Diet of Japan.

=== Future merger ===
A majority of local residents favor remaining an independent municipality, but voices calling for a merger with the neighboring city of Kitakyūshū remain.

== Economy ==
Kanda belongs to the Kitakyushu metropolitan area and serves partly as a commuter town with neighboring Kitakyushu City and Yukuhashi City. It is part of the Kitakyushu industrial zone (region) centered on automobiles, cement, electricity, etc., and has a large concentration of industry compared to its population size. In recent years, the automobile industry has become extremely concentrated, with the Nissan Motor Kyushu Plant (currently Nissan Motor Kyushu) starting operations in 1975 and the Toyota Motor Kyushu Kanda Plant starting operations in 2005. It is developing as an area that is responsible for the automobile industry in northern Kyushu.

== Education ==
Kanda has six public elementary schools and two public junior high schools operated by the town government and one combined public high school operated by the Fukuoka Prefectural Board of Education. The Nishinippon Institute of Technology is also located in Kanda.

== Transportation ==
=== Airports ===
- Kitakyushu Airport (the airport terminal is located in Kokuraminami-ku, Kitakyūshū; however half of the artificial island on which it is built is within the borders of Kanda.

=== Railways ===
JR Kyushu - Nippō Main Line

- Kanda - Obase-Nishikōdai-mae

=== Highways ===
- Higashikyushu Expressway
- National Route 10
- National Route 201

== Sister cities ==
- Samcheok, South Korea, since 1997

== Local attractions ==
- Goshoyama Kofun, National Historic Site
- Ishizukayama Kofun, National Historic Site
- Seiryu Cave, National Natural Monument

=== Festivals ===
- Kanda Float Festival, held annually in mid-September. The festival is famous for its 14 "fighting floats", and has been categorized as an "Intengible Folk Cultural Asset" by the Fukuoka prefecture.
