= Kanda Station (Fukuoka) =

Railway station in Kanda, Fukuoka Prefecture, Japan

JF 08 Kanda Station 苅田駅
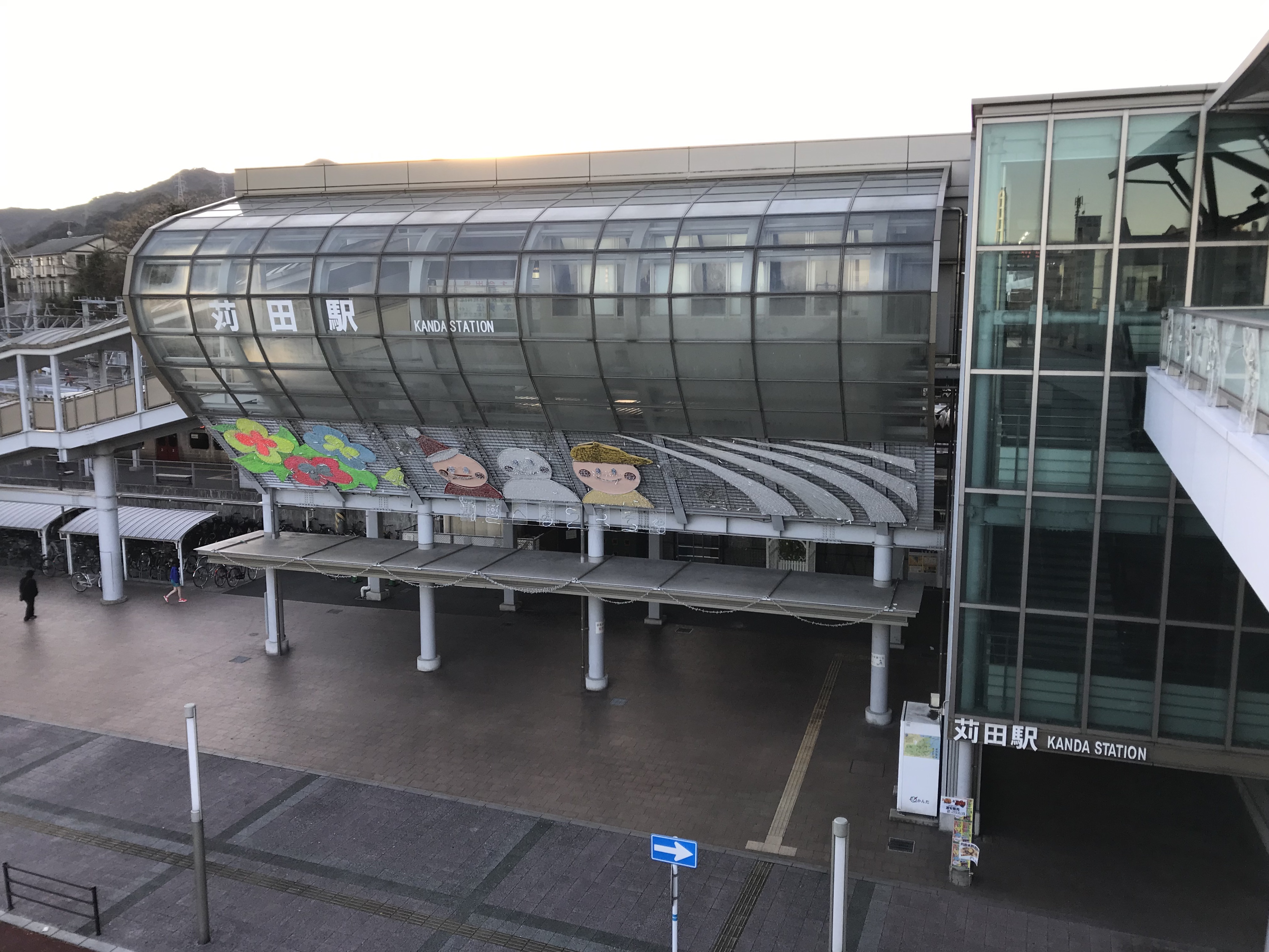
- Kanda Station in December 2018

General information
- Location: 3434 Kanda-machi, Miyako-gun, Fukuoka-ken 800-0364; Japan
- Coordinates: 33°47′05″N 130°58′44″E
- Operator: JR Kyushu
- Line: JF Nippō Main Line
- Distance: 18.6 km from Kokura
- Platforms: 1 side + 1 island platform
- Tracks: 3

Construction
- Structure type: Elevated

Other information
- Status: Staffed ( Midori no Madoguchi )
- Station code: JF08
- Website: Official website

History
- Opened: 1 April 1895
- Former names: Kanta (to 1958)

Passengers
- FY2020: 1821 daily

Services
Preceding station	JR Kyushu	Following station
Obase-Nishikōdai-mae towards Kagoshima	Nippō Main Line	Kusami towards Kokura
Location
- Location within Fukuoka Prefecture Location within Japan

Kanda Station (苅田駅, Kanda-eki) is a passenger railway station located in the town of Kanda, Fukuoka Prefecture, Japan. It is operated by JR Kyushu.

== Lines ==
Kanda Station is served by the Nippō Main Line and is located 18.6 km from the starting point of the line at Kokura.

== Layout ==
The station consists of one side platform and one island platform serving three tracks, connected by an elevated station building. The station has a Midori no Madoguchi staffed ticket office.

=== Platforms ===
1	■ JF Nippō Main Line	for Yukuhashi and Nakatsu
2	■ JF Nippō Main Line	for bi-directional traffic
3	■ JF Nippō Main Line	for Kokura

== History ==
Kanda Station was established on 1 April 1895 as Kanda Station (刈田駅) on the private Kyushu Railway. The railway was nationalized on 1 July 1907, and the kanji of the station name was changed from "刈" to "苅"; however, to avoid confusing with Kanda Station (Tokyo), the official pronunciation of the name was changed to "Kanta" on 16 October 1918. It reverted to its original pronunciation on 1 October 1959. The station building was reconstructed in 1987.

== Passenger statistics ==
In fiscal 2020, there was a daily average of 1821 boarding passengers at this station.

== Surrounding area ==
- Kanda Town Hall
- Kanda Town Kanda Elementary School
- Kanda Town Baba Elementary School

== See also ==
- List of railway stations in Japan
