= Fukubaru Chōjabaru Kanga ruins =

Archaeological site in Japan

- 福原長者原官衙遺跡 (Japanese)
- Fukubaru Chōjabaru Kanga ruins Fukubaru Chōjabaru Kanga ruins (Japan)
- 33°43′43″N 130°58′58″E
- Periods: Nara period
- Location: Yukuhashi, Fukuoka, Japan
- Region: Kyushu

History
- Built: 8th century AD

Site notes
- Elevation: 27 m (89 ft)
- Public access: No
- National Historic Site of Japan

The Fukubaru Chōjabaru Kanga ruins (福原長者原官衙遺跡, Fukubaru Chōjabaru kanga iseki) is an archaeological site with the ruins of a Nara period government administrative complex located in what is now the Minamiizumi neighborhood of the city of Yukuhashi in Fukuoka prefecture in northern Kyushu, Japan. The site has been protected as a National Historic Site from 2017.

== Overview ==
In the late Nara period, after the establishment of a centralized government under the Ritsuryō system, local rule over the provinces was standardized under a kokufu (provincial capital), and each province was divided into smaller administrative districts, known as (郡, gun, kōri), composed of 2–20 townships in 715 AD. Each of the units had an administrative complex, or kanga (官衙遺跡) built on a semi-standardized layout based on contemporary Chinese design, similar to that of the kokufu, but on a much smaller scale. With a square layout or rectangular layout, each had office buildings for administration, taxation, and security, as well as granaries for tax rice and other taxable produce. In the periphery there was typically a Buddhist temple with some official standing. This system collapsed with the growth of feudalism in the late Heian period, and the location of many of the kanga is now lost.

The Fukubaru Chōjabaru site was found as a result of the archaeological excavation survey carried out in conjunction with the construction work of the Higashi Kyushu Expressway, which began in 2010. The site was found to be is the largest government office (kanga) ruins in Kyushu, with a layout patterned after Fujiwara-kyō palace in Asuka, Nara. The Miyako Plain, where this ruin is located, contains large kofun tumuli and is the location of the Buzen Kokubun-ji, and was the center of ancient Buzen Province. From the viewpoint of the Kinai region, Buzen, located at the western end of the Seto Inland Sea, was the gateway to Kyushu. The ancient coastline extended deeper into the Miyako Plain than the current coastline, so the location of this site was closer to the Gulf of Suo than at present.

This ruin was initially thought to be the original provincial capital of the province, but because it was established at the end of the 7th century, earlier than the kokufu system, and because of its extremely large size, it is now believed to have been more than just a provincial administrative site, but a major outpost of the central government, possibly developed together with Dazaifu, the official capital of Kyushu. The designated name of the historic site was therefore "Fukubaru Chōjabaru Kanga Ruins instead of "Buzen Kokufu Ruins because it is possible that this site was more than just the provincial capital. The place name "Chōjabaru" also suggests that some kind of large building once existed. The site was abandoned in the middle of the 8th century, and it is highly likely that the function as the provincial capital was moved elsewhere (most likely to the site now known as the "Buzen Kokufu Ruins" in the neighbouring town of Miyako.

During excavations conducted from 1996 to 1997 in conjunction with prefectural road widening construction, two types of ditches (five meters and threemeters wide, respectively) and the remains of pit dwellings from the Kofun period were found. From 2010 to 2012, the remains of partition ditches and corridor-like structures that divided the land into squares were discovered. The foundations of a group of large-scale dug-out pillared buildings surrounded by the ditches was revealed, and it became clear that this site was the remains of a government palace built around the first half of the 8th century. It was also found that the east–west length of the two partition ditches was 128 meters and 150 meters respectively, indicating that the government office was extremely large. The excavation from 2012 to 2015 used ground penetrating radar to confirm the scope and contents of ruins. The main building was found to have been a seven-by-three bay structure, with east and west six-by-two bay side halls, surrounded by a corridor with a length of 118 meters on each side. A large eight-pillar gate was located in the south, and a smaller four-pillar gate in the east. As the site of a typical kanga was around 50 meters square, and a typical kokufu around 100 meters square, a complex 150 meters on each side is unprecedented. Furthermore, the use of eight-pillar gates was restricted to national government offices as a rule. The provision of a wide open space between the dividing ditch and the corridor seems to be intended to create a sense of grandeur, and an example of such a plan with open space and a ditch (outer moat) can be seen at the Fujiwara-kyō palace.

The excavated artifacts include Sue ware and Haji ware pottery. Some Sue ware mortar lids had been repurposed as ink stones and date back to the fourth quarter of the 7th century, but most of the excavated items date to the first half of the 8th century. Other artifacts related to metalworking, such as part of a blacksmith's bellows were also discovered.

The site has been backfilled for preservation, and is now a flower park with an explanatory placard. It is located approximately 13 minutes by car from Yoshitomi Station on the JR Kyushu Nippō Main Line and is adjacent to the Shinyoshitomo Road Station on the Japan National Route 10 highway.

== See also ==
- List of Historic Sites of Japan (Fukuoka)
