= Shiida =

Shiida may be refer to:

- Caeda (also known as Shiida in the European versions and Super Smash Bros. Brawl), the princess of Talys and the playable character from Fire Emblem: Shadow Dragon
- Shiida, Fukuoka, the Japanese town located in Chikujō District, Fukuoka
- Shiida Station, the Japanese railway station on the Nippō Main Line

== See also ==
- Shida (disambiguation)
