= Funasako Kiln ruins =

Funasako Kiln Site
- 船迫窯跡 (Japanese)
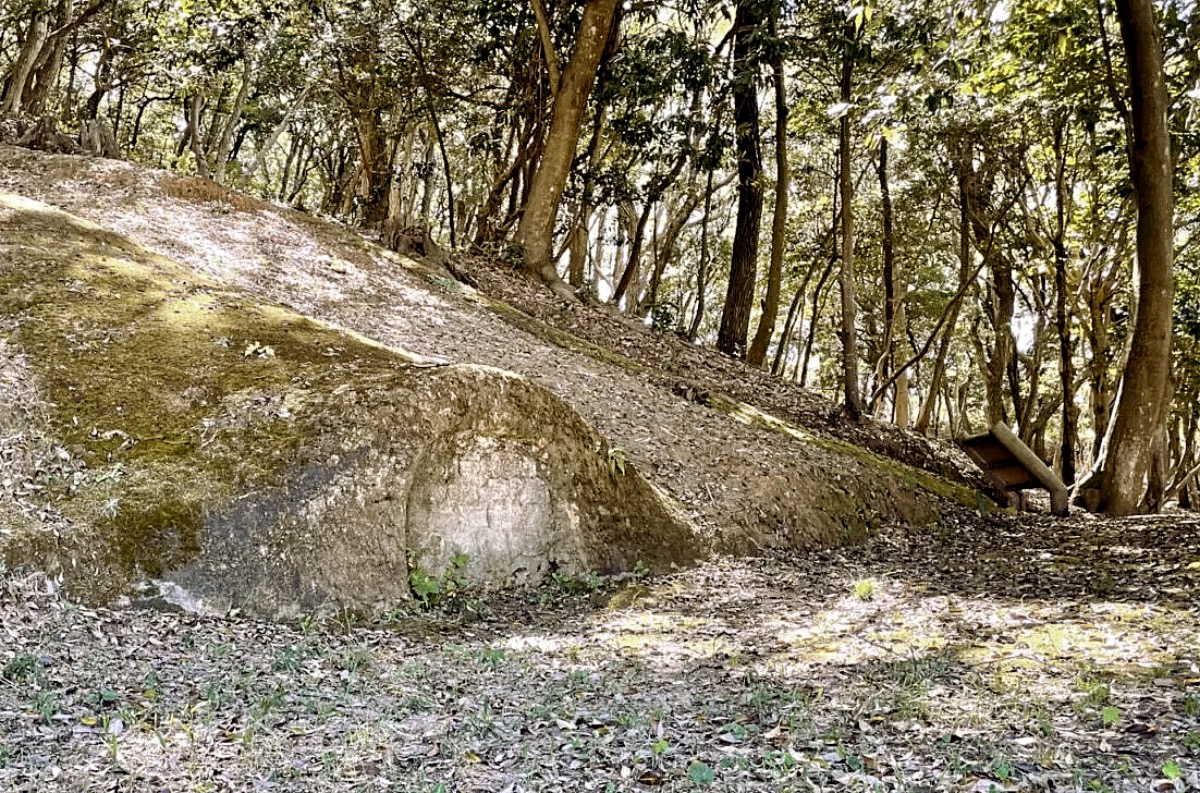
- Funasako Kiln ruins

- Funasako Kiln ruins Funasako Kiln ruins (Japan)
- 33°39′35″N 130°59′57″E
- Periods: Nara period
- Location: Chikujō, Fukuoka, Japan
- Region: Kyushu region

Site notes
- Public access: Yes (archaeological park)
- National Historic Site of Japan

The Funasako Kiln ruins' (船迫窯跡, Funasako kama ato) is an archaeological site containing a Nara period kiln located in the Funasako neighborhood of the town of Chikujō, Chikujō District, Fukuoka Prefecture Japan. The site was designated a National Historic Site of Japan in 1999.

== Overview ==
The Funasako kiln ruins are located at the northern end of a hill connected to a spur extending north from the Hiko Mountains. It consists of a group of kiln ruins, consisting of the Chausuyama Higashi kiln ruins (茶臼山東窯跡), the Dogaheri kiln ruins (堂がへり窯跡), and the Dogaheri tile making workshop site (堂がへり遺跡(瓦製作工房)), as well as the remains of the Uto kiln ruins (宇土窯跡), which no longer exists. Its existence was widely known from the 1960s, but it was not excavated until 1994 until a farm development project threatened the site.

The Chausuyama Higashi kiln site has five noborigama kilns on a hillside. Kilns 1 to 3 and 5 are Sue ware kilns dating to the late 6th century, and Kiln 4 fired both Sue ware pottery and roof tiles in the mid 7th century. The Dogaheri kiln ruins, which consists of four kilns, is on a hill about 200 meters east. In the latter half of the 8th century, roof tiles for the Buzen Kokubun-ji were fired at this site, and Sue ware was fired in the No. 3 and No. 4 kilns from the end of the 6th century to the beginning of the 7th century, and roof tiles were fired in the latter half of the 7th century. The No. 2 kiln was stepped-bed type with a total length of 10 meters, and the No. 4 kiln was a stepless type kiln, with a wide and flat work surface in the vestibule and total length of 9.6 meters. The Dogaheri Ruins and to the north of the Dogaheri Kiln site. The remains from the end of the 6th century to the beginning of the 7th century include an oval earthen pit with a long diameter of 4 meters, which is thought to be a clay reservoir, and is thought to be related to the production of Sue ware at Dogaheri kilns No. 3 and 4. The remains of the latter half of the 8th century are thought to be a tile-making workshop for the Buzen Kokubun-ji, and include two large pillared buildings with eaves running north and south, and a 10x2 bay main building. The two large, dug-out pillared buildings are lined up north and south of the main building with the pillars spaced approximately 6 meters apart, and are thought to have been facilities used for making and drying tiles.

Items found at the site include Sue ware pottery shards, and roof tiles such as Baekche-style single layer eight-petal lotus pattern eaves tiles, Hōryū-ji-style multi-layer seven-petal lotus pattern eaves tiles, arabesque-patterned flat tiles, shibi tiles, onigawara, flat tiles, round tiles, and also miniature earthenware for ritual purposes, and more. Tiles from these kilns have been found in throughout the northern Kyushu region, and tiles for repairing kokubunji temples from the first half of the 9th century were unearthed at the Uto kiln site. The history of this kiln can be traced from the start of firing Sue ware in the latter half of the 6th century, through the early production of tiles in the mid-7th century, to the supply of roof tiles to Buzen Kokubun-ji. It is one of the few kiln sites where the overall structure of the workshop ruins, including the dug-out pillar building, and the kilns are clearly integrated.

The surrounding area is now Funasako Kiln Ruins Park. The site is approximately ten minutes by car from Tsuiki Station on the JR Kyushu Nippō Main Line.

== See also ==
- List of Historic Sites of Japan (Fukuoka)
