= Dainose Kanga ruins =

Archaeological site in Japan

- 大ノ瀬官衙遺跡 (Japanese)
- Dainose Kanga ruins Dainose Kanga ruins (Japan)
- 33°35′17.0″N 131°09′13.3″E
- Type: kanga ruins
- Periods: Nara - Heian period
- Location: Kōge, Fukuoka, Japan
- Region: Kyushu

History
- Built: 8th-9th century AD

Site notes
- Elevation: 27 m (89 ft)
- Public access: No
- National Historic Site of Japan

The Dainose Kanga ruins (大ノ瀬官衙遺跡, Dainose Kanga iseki) is an archaeological site with the ruins of a Nara to Heian period government administrative complex located in what is now the town of Kōge in Fukuoka prefecture in northern Kyushu, Japan. The site has been protected as a National Historic Site since 1998.

== Overview ==
In the late Nara period, after the establishment of a centralized government under the Ritsuryō system, local rule over the provinces was standardized under a kokufu (provincial capital), and each province was divided into smaller administrative districts, known as (郡, gun, kōri), composed of 2–20 townships in 715 AD. Each of the units had an administrative complex, or kanga (官衙遺跡) built on a semi-standardized layout based on contemporary Chinese design, similar to that of the kokufu, but on a much smaller scale. Each had a square or rectangular layout, with office buildings for administration, taxation, and security, as well as granaries for tax rice and other taxable produce. In the periphery there was typically a Buddhist temple with some official standing. This system collapsed with the growth of feudalism in the Late Heian period, and the location of many of the kanga is now lost.

The Dainose Kanga ruins are located in the former Shinyoshitomi Village, Kōge Town, facing the Gulf of Suo on the Seto Inland Sea. This area corresponds to the ancient Kōge District of Buzen Province, and the ruins are located on a low terrace approximately 1.5 kilometers wide and approximately 30 meters above sea level between the Yamakuni River to the east and the Sai River to the west. In the surrounding area, remnants of an ancient jori land division running from west-northwest to east-southeast remains, and the site faces the remains of an ancient road which is thought to be the ancient government highway used by imperial envoys to Usa Shrine in the Nara period. The site was discovered in 1995 during a field maintenance project. The central rectangular section of the site is surrounded by the remnants of fences, and measures approximately 58.5 meters from north to south and 53.4 meters from east to west, with the eastern side having a large gate supported by four pillars. The center of the area is a plaza was a large 7x 4 bay building on the west side. On the north side of the plaza, in the direction perpendicular to the large building, was large and narrow 12 x 2 bay structure. The orientation of these main buildings is approximately 35 degrees to 40 degrees west from the north, similar to the surrounding jori land distribution. Outside this central area, the foundations of 20 dug-pillar structures, distributed in an area of approximately 150 meters from east to west and north to south, and there are rows of fences and ditches on three sides, excluding the south side. The scales and structures of these buildings vary; there is a large 10 x 2 bay building on the west side, but many are smaller and are thought to the ancillary buildings and warehouses.

Excavated artifacts include Sue ware and Haji ware pottery, as well as circular ink stones, green-glazed pottery, and roof tiles, but judging from the earthenware, the buildings were completed in the early to mid-eighth century, and were abandoned between the end of the 8th century and the beginning of the 9th century. Although there is only one side hall and the ruins of most kanga excavated indicate a "U" shaped orientation of structures, from the rectangular plot and the scale and layout of the buildings, as well as the location, it is believed that this is the ruins of the Nara period Kōge District office for Buzen Province.

The site has been backfilled for preservation, and is now a flower park with an explanatory placard. It is located approximately 13 minutes by car from Yoshitomi Station on the JR Kyushu Nippō Main Line and is adjacent to the Shinyoshitomo Road Station on the Japan National Route 10 highway.

== See also ==
- List of Historic Sites of Japan (Fukuoka)
