= Tomoeda Tile Kiln Site =

Archaeological site in Japan

Tomoeda Tile Kiln ruins
- 友枝瓦窯跡 (Japanese)
- Tomoeda Tile Kiln ruins Tomoeda Tile Kiln Site (Japan)
- Interactive map of Tomoeda Tile Kiln ruins
- 33°33′59″N 131°08′43″E
- Type: kiln ruins
- Periods: Nara period
- Location: Kōge, Fukuoka, Japan
- Region: Kyushu

Site notes
- Public access: Yes

The Tomoeda Tile Kiln ruins (友枝瓦窯跡, Tomoeda kawara gama ato) is an archaeological site with the ruins of a Nara period kiln, located in the town of Kōge, Chikujō District, Fukuoka Prefecture Japan. It was designated a National Historic Site of Japan in 1922.

== Overview ==
Kawara (瓦) roof tiles made of fired clay were introduced to Japan from Baekche during the 6th century along with Buddhism. During the 570s under the reign of Emperor Bidatsu, the king of Baekche sent six people to Japan skilled in various aspects of Buddhism, including a temple architect. Initially, tiled roofs were a sign of great wealth and prestige, and used for temple and government buildings. The material had the advantages of great strength and durability, and could also be made at locations around the country wherever clay was available.

The Tomoeda Tile Kiln was located near the current municipal Minami Yoshitomi Elementary School. This underground climbing kiln was built by hollowing out granite bedrock on the slope of a hill during the Nara period. Two kiln ruins were discovered in 1913, and two more have been confirmed by archaeological excavations since then. One was in almost complete preservation. The combustion chamber for firing roof tiles is 6.15 meters long, and there are 17 stages on which tiles are placed, and there are few kilns in Kyushu that have a combustion chamber with stages. The ceiling is arched and has two flues. The excavated tiles are of two types: Silla-style roof tiles and Baekje-style roof tiles. Silla-style tiles have arabesque patterns with thin circle lines around the outer edge, while Baekje-style tiles have lotus patterns decorated with single circles around the periphery. Many fragments of identical tiles have been excavated from the Tarumi temple ruins, located approximately two kilometers away. Related materials are on display at the Kōge Town History and Folklore Museum.

The site is located approximately seven kilometres south of Yoshitomi Station on the JR Kyushu Nippō Main Line.

== See also ==
- List of Historic Sites of Japan (Fukuoka)
