= Goshogotani Kōgoishi =

Castle ruins in Miyako and Yukuhashi, Fukuoka, Japan

Goshogatani Kōgoishi
- 御所ヶ谷神籠石
- Miyako and Yukuhashi, Fukuoka, Japan
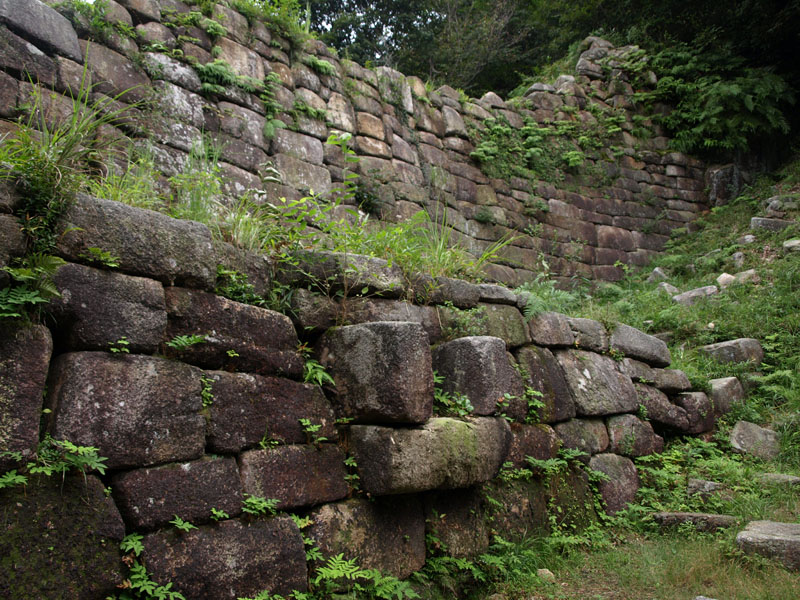
- Goshogatani Kōgoishi

Site information
- Type: Korean-style fortress
- Condition: Ruins

Location
- Coordinates: 33°40′28.2″N 130°55′52.2″E

Site history
- Built: 668-670
- Built by: Yamato court
- In use: Asuka period
- Goshogotani Kōgoishi (Fukuoka Prefecture) Goshogotani Kōgoishi (Japan) National Historic Site of Japan

Goshogatani Kōgoishi (御所ヶ谷神籠石) was an ancient castle (also known as a Korean-style fortresses in Japan (朝鮮式山城, Chōsen-shiki yamajiro) straddling the border between the Katsuyama Okubo townships of Miyako and the Tsuzumi neighborhood of the city of Yukuhashi, Fukuoka Prefecture Japan. Its ruins have been protected as a National Historic Site since 1953, with the area under protection expanded in 1998.

== History ==
After the defeat of the combined Baekje and Yamato Japan forces, at the hands of the Silla and Tang China alliance at the Battle of Hakusukinoe in 663, the Yamato court feared an invasion from either or both Tang or Silla. In response, a huge network of shore fortifications was constructed throughout the rest of the 600s, often with the assistance of Baekje engineers, generals and artisans. Unaware of the outbreak of the Silla-Tang War (670–676), the Japanese would continue to build fortifications until 701, even after finding out that Silla was no longer friendly with Tang.

The Goshogatani Kōgoishi is located in the eastern part of Fukuoka Prefecture, on the northwest slope of Mount Goshogake (elevation 247 meters) in the Umagatake mountain range that extends to the south of the Miyako Plain and faces the Bay of Suo on the Seto Inland Sea. The ruins, including stone rows, earthworks, and gate ruins, span a total length of approximately 3 kilometers in a roughly inverted triangular shape with the mountaintop as the base and the northern valley as the apex. This fortification is not mentioned in the Nihon Shoki or any other ancient documentation, and its existence as an ancient mountain castle was determined through archaeological excavation. The exact date of construction is thus unknown; however, a piece of Sue ware pottery, thought to date from the latter half of the 7th century, was discovered in the collapsed soil of one of the earthworks. This roughly corresponds to the period after the 663 Battle of Hakusukinoe. The fortification is situated so that it protects the site ancient provincial capital of Buzen Province and overlooks the official road connecting Dazaifu with Buzen and the east–west road connecting Buzen with Chikuzen Province. The ancient port of Kusanotsu was located approximately seven kilometers to the north and was a key point for land and sea transportation.

The name of the castle, "Goshogatani" is a later appellation, based on a legend that Emperor Keiko's palace was located here during his conquest of the Kumaso tribes of Kyushu.

The earthwork is two kilometers long, approximately seven meters wide at the base and five meters high, with walls rising at an angle of 70 to 80 degrees. It is mostly rammed earth covered with a thickness of 3 to 10 centimeters rows of cut granite stones. The fortification appears to have had seven gate. In particular, the stone wall at the middle gate is 7.5 meters high and 18 meters long, and includes a two-tiered stone embankment and a water gate, making it a particularly noteworthy remains. A drainage ditch is installed in the lower tier to allow the water gate to protrude. On a ridge at an elevation of 121 meters within the castle grounds, is the foundations of a building with three beam rows and four girder rows of pillars and foundation stones, and rows of stones that have been repurposed. It is located in the center of the castle with a great visibility, and is easily accessible from other parts of the castle, so is considered to be the keep. Inside the castle on the west side of the central gate, remains of an unfinished earthwork with a length of 300 meters. Many of the stone rows have been removed, but the rammed earth layer on the back of the stone rows has been confirmed. It is believed that the planned layout of the castle changed during construction.

The site is now preserved as a park, and the ruins are approximately ten minutes by car from Toyotsu Station on the Heisei Chikuhō Railway Tagawa Line.

== See also ==
- List of Historic Sites of Japan (Fukuoka)
- List of foreign-style castles in Japan
- Kōgoishi

== Literature ==
- De Lange, William (2021). An Encyclopedia of Japanese Castles. Groningen: Toyo Press. pp. 600 pages. ISBN 978-9492722300.
- Motoo, Hinago (1986). Japanese Castles. Tokyo: Kodansha. pp. 200 pages. ISBN 0-87011-766-1.
