= Kōge, Fukuoka =

Kōge 上毛町
- Town
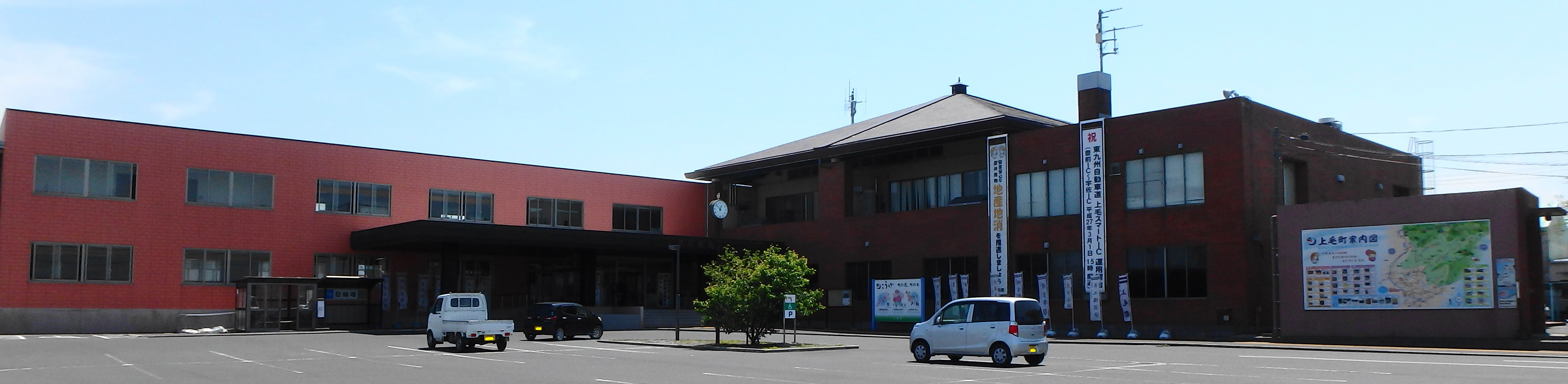
- Kōge town hall

- Flag Emblem
- Interactive map of Kōge
- Location in Japan
- Coordinates: 33°34′42″N 131°09′51″E
- Country: Japan
- Region: Kyushu
- Prefecture: Fukuoka
- District: Chikujō

Area
  - Total: 62.44 km^{2} (24.11 sq mi)

Population (30 November 2023)
  - Total: 7,269
  - Density: 116.4/km^{2} (301.5/sq mi)
- Time zone: UTC+09:00 (JST)
- City hall address: 1321-1 Tarumi, Kamige-cho, Chikjo-gun, Fukuoka-ken 871-0992
- Website: Official website

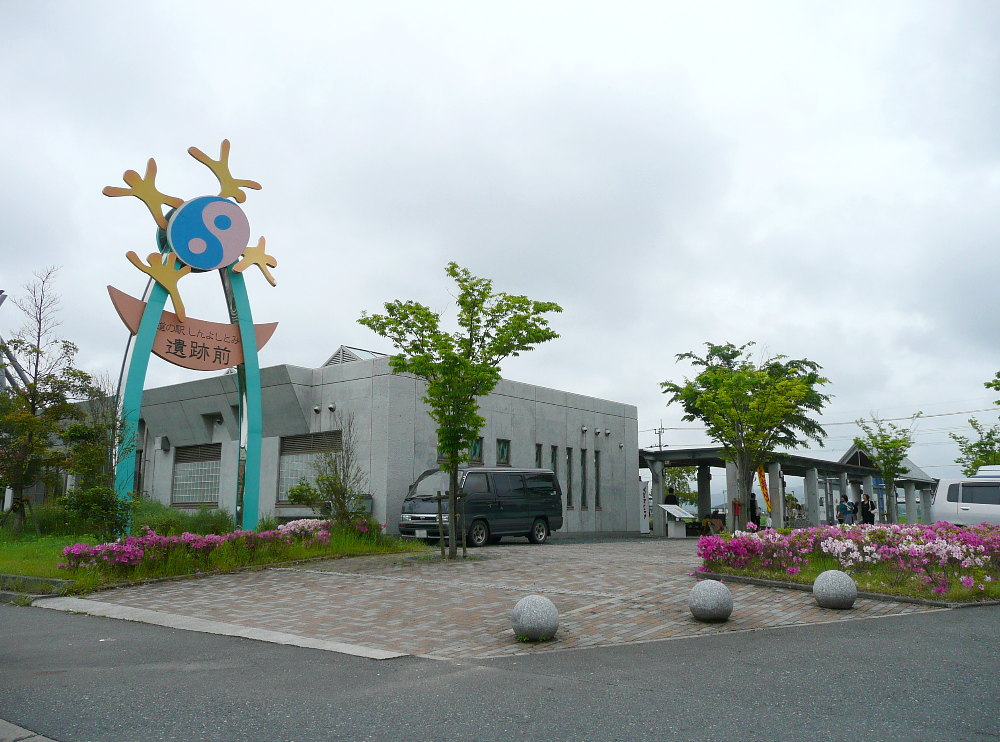
Michi-no-eki Shin-Yoshitomi

Kōge (上毛町, Kōge-machi) is a town located in Chikujō, Fukuoka Prefecture, Japan. As of 31 October 2023, the town had an estimated population of 7,269 in 3228 households, and a population density of 120 persons per km^{2}. The total area of the town is 62.44 km^{2} (24.11 sq mi).

== Geography ==
Kōge is the easternmost town in Fukuoka Prefecture, bordering Buzen City to the west, Yoshitomi Town to the north, and Nakatsu City in Oita Prefecture across the Yamakuni River. The northern part of the town area is a plain, and the southern part is mountainous.

=== Neighbouring municipalities ===
Fukuoka Prefecture

- Buzen
- Yoshitomi

Ōita Prefecture

- Nakatsu

=== Climate ===
Kōge has a humid subtropical climate (Köppen Cfa) characterized by warm summers and cool winters with light to no snowfall. The average annual temperature in Kōge is 14.9 °C. The average annual rainfall is 1623 mm with September as the wettest month. The temperatures are highest on average in August, at around 26.0 °C, and lowest in January, at around 3.8 °C.

=== Demographics ===
Per Japanese census data, the population of Kōge is as shown below

Historical population
Year	Pop.	±%
1940	9,379	—
1950	12,197	+30.0%
1960	11,186	−8.3%
1970	9,180	−17.9%
1980	8,780	−4.4%
1990	8,636	−1.6%
2000	8,296	−3.9%
2010	7,849	−5.4%
2020	7,251	−7.6%

== History ==
The area of Kōge was part of ancient Buzen Province. During the Edo period it was under control of Nakatsu Domain. The villages of Minami-Yoshitomi and Nishi-Yoshitomi within Kōgei District, Fukuoka were established on May 1, 1889, with the creation of the modern municipalities system. Kōgei District became Chikujō District in 1896. The two villages merged to form the village of Shin-Yoshitomi on March 1, 1955. On October 11, 2005, the villages of Shin'yoshitomi and Taihei merged to form the village of Kōge. Efforts to merge the town of Buzen have failed to secure popular support.

== Government ==
Kōge has a mayor-council form of government with a directly elected mayor and a unicameral town council of 12 members. Kōge, collectively with Buzen and the other municipalities of Chikujō District contributes one member to the Fukuoka Prefectural Assembly. In terms of national politics, the town is part of the Fukuoka 11th district of the lower house of the Diet of Japan.

== Economy ==
The economy of Kōge is dominated by agriculture. The raising of yuzu and other citrus fruits are the most important crops.

== Education ==
Kōge has four public elementary schools and one public junior high school operated by the town government. The town does not have a high school.

== Transportation ==
=== Railways ===
Kōge does not have any passenger railway service. The nearest train stations are Yoshitomi Station or Nakatsu Station on the JR Kyushu Nippo Main Line.

=== Highways ===
- Higashikyushu Expressway
- National Route 10

== Local attractions ==
=== National Historic Sites ===
- Anagahayama Kofun
- Dainose Kanga ruins
- Tōbarusan Castle ruins
- Tomoeda Tile Kiln Site
