= Tsuiki, Fukuoka =

Town

Tsuiki (築城町, Tsuiki-machi) was a town located in Chikujō District, Fukuoka Prefecture, Japan.

As of 2003, the town had an estimated population of 9,448 and a density of 139.68 persons per km^{2}. The total area was 67.64 km^{2}.

On January 10, 2006, Tsuiki, along with the town of Shiida (also from Chikujō District), was merged to create the town of Chikujō.

== See also ==
- Tsuiki Air Field
- Tsuiki Station
