= Tachibanazuka Kofun =

- 橘塚古墳 (Japanese)
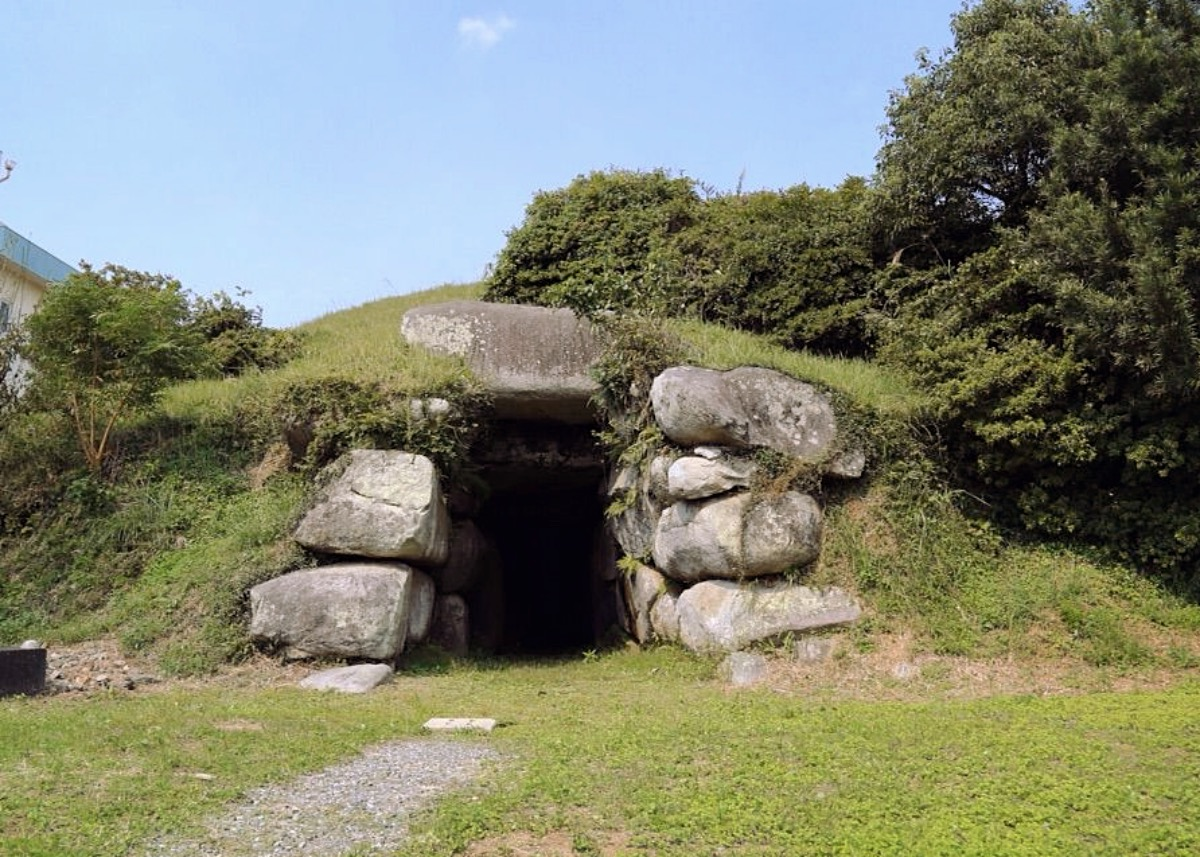
- Tachibanazuka Kofun

- Tachibanazuka Kofun Tachibanazuka Kofun (Japan)
- Interactive map of Tachibanazuka Kofun
- 33°42′18″N 130°54′59″E
- Type: Kofun
- Periods: Kofun period
- Location: Miyako, Fukuoka, Japan
- Region: Kyushu

History
- Built: c.6th century

Site notes
- Public access: Yes (no facilities)

The Tachibanazuka Kofun (橘塚古墳) is a Kofun period burial mound, located in the Katsuyama Kuroda neighborhood of the town of Miyako, Miyako District, Fukuoka Prefecture Japan. The tumulus was designated a National Historic Site of Japan in 1970.

== Overview ==
The Tachibanazuka Kofun is located in a corner of the schoolyard of Miyako Town Kuroda Elementary School, about 500 meters east of Ayazuka Kofun. It is a tomb made of gigantic granite megaliths. Since it has been open for a long time, no grave goods have been discovered. It was previously thought to be an enpun (円墳)-style circular tumulus, but research from 1995 revealed that it was actually a hofun (方墳)-style square tumulus, measuring 37 meters from north-to-south and 52 meters from east-to-west with a height of 3.8 meters. The structure of the stone burial chamber is very similar to that of the nearby Ayazuka Kofun. From the structure of the burial chamber, it is believed to be slightly older than the Ayazuka Kofun, and was built around the end of the 6th century.

It is located in a corner of Kuroda Elementary School's schoolyard, near Japan National Route 201 and approximately 4.6 kilometers due west of Imagawa-Kappa Station on the Heisei Chikuhō Railway Tagawa Line.

== See also ==
- List of Historic Sites of Japan (Fukuoka)
