= Tōbarusan Castle =

Castle ruins in Kōge, Fukuoka, Japan

- 唐原山城跡
- Kōge, Fukuoka Prefecture, Japan

Site information
- Type: Korean-style fortress
- Condition: Ruins

Location
- Coordinates: 33°33′57″N 131°09′38″E

Site history
- Built: 668-670
- Built by: Yamato court
- In use: Asuka period
- Tōbarusan Castle (Fukuoka Prefecture) Tōbarusan Castle (Japan) National Historic Site of Japan

Tōbarusan Castle (唐原山城跡, Tōbarusan-jō ato) was an ancient castle (also known as a Korean-style fortresses in Japan (朝鮮式山城, Chōsen-shiki yamajiro) located in the town of Kōge, Chikujō District, Fukuoka Prefecture Japan. Its ruins have been protected as a National Historic Site since 2005.

== History ==
After the defeat of the combined Baekje and Yamato Japan forces, at the hands of the Silla and Tang China alliance at the Battle of Hakusukinoe in 663, the Yamato court feared an invasion from either or both Tang or Silla. In response, a huge network of shore fortifications was constructed throughout the rest of the 600s, often with the assistance of Baekje engineers, generals and artisans. Unaware of the outbreak of the Silla-Tang War (670–676), the Japanese would continue to build fortifications until 701, even after finding out that Silla was no longer friendly with Tang.

Tōbarusan Castle is located near the mouth of the Yamakuni River, which flows into the Gulf of Suo on the Seto Inland Sea, and which forms the border between modern Fukuoka and Ōita Prefecture. The fortifications are located on an independent hill measuring approximately 0.8 kilometres (0.50 mi) north–south, approximately 0.6 kilometres (0.37 mi) east–west, and approximately 70 metres (230 ft) above sea level. The surrounding coast has many similar ruins of ancient mountain castles. As a result of an archaeological excavation conducted in 1998, rows of cut granite stones and earthworks with an L-shaped cut at the top, which is a characteristic of ancient mountain castles, were found on the hill, and from the northwestern part of the hill to the east and rows of cut stones with as many as three stones connected were confirmed in four locations to the south. Even in areas where there are no stone rows, terrace-like flat surfaces with a width of three to four meters were detected at locations corresponding to the estimated stone row lines. The existence of stone rows on the hill was known to the locals long before the ruins came to the attention of academia. Edo Period records indicate that large numbers of stone blocks were taken from this site for use in the construction of Nakatsu Castle, which is located approximately five kilometers away. The total length of the stone walls when intact is estimated to have been approximately 1.7 kilometres (1.1 mi) long, and the fortification encloses three valleys, with water gates built in each valley. Although no relics were excavated that directly indicate the time of construction of the fortification, it is thought that it was built around the latter half of the 7th century based on its structure and other similar examples.

The ruins are approximately 20 minutes by car from Nakatsu Station on the JR Kyushu Nippo Main Line.

== See also ==
- List of Historic Sites of Japan (Fukuoka)
- List of foreign-style castles in Japan
- Kōgoishi

== Literature ==
- De Lange, William (2021). An Encyclopedia of Japanese Castles. Groningen: Toyo Press. pp. 600 pages. ISBN 978-9492722300.
- Motoo, Hinago (1986). Japanese Castles. Tokyo: Kodansha. pp. 200 pages. ISBN 0-87011-766-1.
