= Anagahayama Kofun =

- 穴ヶ葉山古墳 (Japanese)
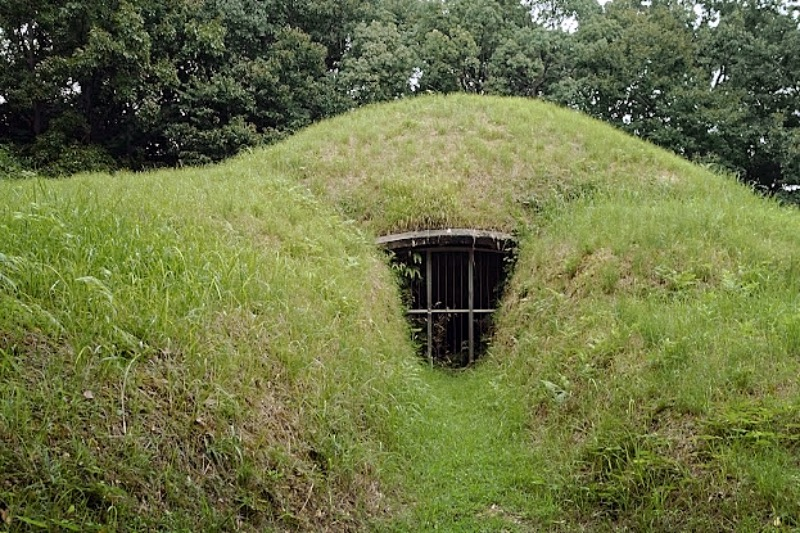
- Anegahayama Kofun No.1

- Anagahayama Kofun Anagahayama Kofun (Japan)
- 33°33′47″N 131°10′08″E
- Type: Kofun
- Periods: Kofun period
- Location: Kōge, Fukuoka, Japan
- Region: Kyushu

History
- Built: c.6th - 7th century

Site notes
- Public access: Yes (no facilities)
- National Historic Site of Japan

The Anagahayama Kofun (穴ヶ葉山古墳) is a Kofun period burial mound, located in the Shimokarahara neighborhood of the town of Kōge, Chikujō District, Fukuoka Prefecture Japan. The tumulus was designated a National Historic Site of Japan in 1939.

== Overview ==
The Anagahayama Kofun is located on the eastern slope of a hill on the left bank of the Yamakuni River, which forms the border between Ōita and Fukuoka prefectures. Designated Anagahana Kofun No.1, it is the main tumulus of a cluster of three ancient tombs. It is an enpun (円墳)-style circular tumulus, with a diameter of 30 meters, surrounded by a six-meter wide horseshoe-shaped moat. It is orientated to the south-southwest. The ten-meter horizontal-passage burial chamber is made of large monoliths. The walls of the passageway and burial chamber are decorated with line-carved murals, and themes include leaf patterns, fish, people, insects, and birds. The leaf pattern is especially large, measuring 52 cm in length, and the veins of the leaf are also expressed. Most decorated kofun, especially in central and northern Kyushu, have painted patterns; whereas line-engraved decorations are more common in Tottori and Shimane Prefectures. The tumulus is thought to have been built between the end of the 6th century and the early 7th century, based on artifacts excavated from 1993 to 1995 and shards of Sue ware pottery. The Anagahayama Kofun is listed in the family registry of Tozato, Kōge District, dated 702, which is preserved at the Shōsōin in Nara. Per this document, it was the tomb of an influential toraijin immigrant clan from mainland Asia who had settled in the area.

Anagahana Kofun No.2 is a much smaller enpun-style tumulus with a diameter of ten meters, and Anagahana Kofun No.3 is likewise an enpun-style tumulus with a diameter of 19 meters. Anagahana Kofun No.3 also has some line decorations, but neither tumulus is part of the National Historic Site.

The site is approximately 20 minutes by car from Nakatsu Station on the JR Kyushu Nippō Main Line.

In former Ohira Village to the south was the Anagahayama Minami Kofun cluster with more than ten kofun; however six were destroyed to make way for an industrial waste disposal site. During excavations in 1983, a line-engraved mural was discovered in the stone chamber of Anagahayama Minami Kofun No. 3, so only this tumulus was preserved within the grounds of the disposal site. It is an enpun-style tumulus with a diameter of 13 meters, surrounded by a one-meter wide moat. The horizontal entry stone burial chamber has a total length of 5.6 meters. Patterns that appear to be leaves can be seen in three places.

== See also ==
- List of Historic Sites of Japan (Fukuoka)
- Decorated kofun
