= Yoshitomi, Fukuoka =

Yoshitomi 吉富町
- Town
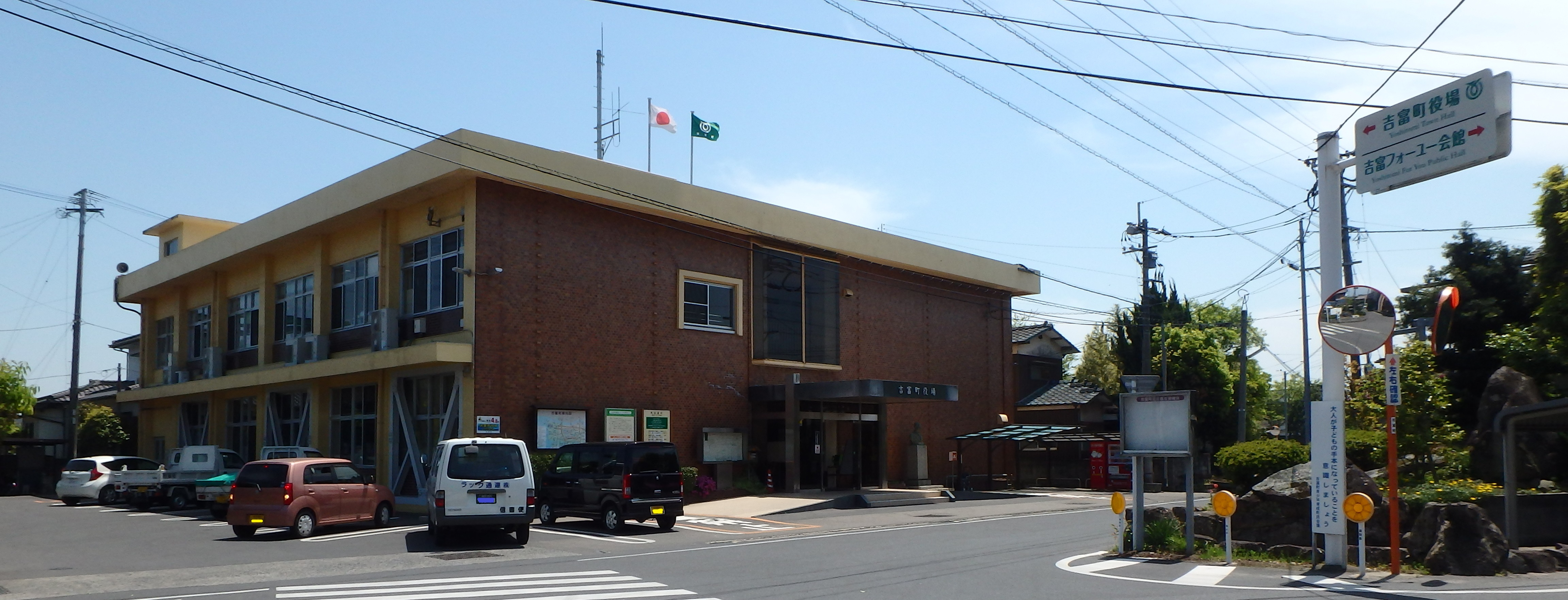
- Yoshitomi Town Hall

- Flag Emblem
- Location of Yoshitomi in Fukuoka Prefecture

- Location in Japan
- Coordinates: 33°36′10″N 131°10′33″E
- Country: Japan
- Region: Kyushu
- Prefecture: Fukuoka
- District: Chikujō

Area
  - Total: 5.72 km^{2} (2.21 sq mi)

Population (December 1, 2023)
  - Total: 6,617
  - Density: 1,160/km^{2} (3,000/sq mi)
- Time zone: UTC+09:00 (JST)
- City hall address: 226-1 Hirotsu, Yoshitomi-machi, Chikujo-gun, Fukuoka-ken 871-8585
- Website: Official website
- Symbols
- Flower: Rhododendron indicum
- Tree: osmanthus fragrans

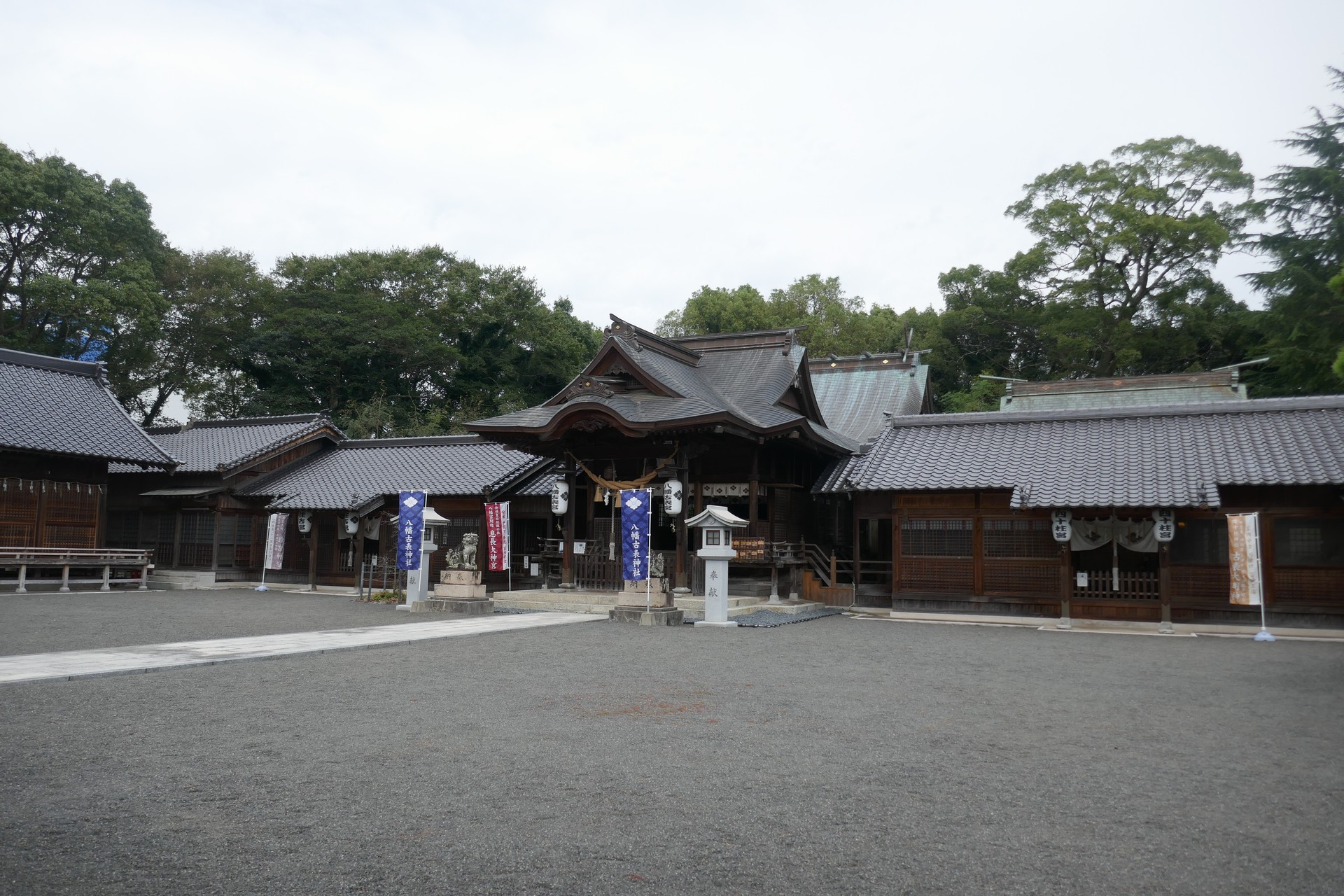
Hachiman Kohyo Jinja in Yoshitomi

Yoshitomi (吉富町, Yoshitomi-machi) is a town located in Chikujō District, Fukuoka Prefecture, Japan. As of 2 December 2023, the town had an estimated population of 6,617 in 3075 households, and a population density of 1200 persons per km². The total area of the town is 5.72 km^{2} (2.21 sq mi).

== Geography ==
Yoshitomi is located in the far southeast corner of Fukuoka Prefecture. It borders Nakatsu City in Ōita Prefecture across the first-class river Yamakuni River to the east, Jomo Town to the south, and Buzen City to the west. With an area of 5.68 square kilometers, it is the smallest municipality in Kyushu and the 12th smallest in Japan. It is only about two kilometers east-west and three kilometers north-south, and the urban area is concentrated around Yoshitomi Station and has a relatively high population density.

=== Neighbouring municipalities ===
Fukuoka Prefecture

- Buzen
- Kōge

Ōita Prefecture

- Nakatsu

=== Climate ===
Yoshitomi has a humid subtropical climate (Köppen Cfa) characterized by warm summers and cool winters with light to no snowfall. The average annual temperature in Yoshitomi is 14.9 °C. The average annual rainfall is 1623 mm with September as the wettest month. The temperatures are highest on average in August, at around 26.0 °C, and lowest in January, at around 3.8 °C.

=== Demographics ===
Per Japanese census data, the population of Yoshitomi is as shown below

Historical population
Year	Pop.	±%
1940	5,223	—
1950	7,583	+45.2%
1960	7,152	−5.7%
1970	7,317	+2.3%
1980	7,749	+5.9%
1990	7,364	−5.0%
2000	7,188	−2.4%
2010	6,792	−5.5%
2020	6,536	−3.8%

== History ==
The area of Yoshitomi was part of ancient Buzen Province. During the Edo period it was under control of Nakatsu Domain. The village of Higashi-Yoshiomi within Kōgei District, Fukuoka was established on May 1, 1889 with the creation of the modern municipalities system. Kōgei District became Chikujō District in 1896. Higashi-Yoshitomi was raised to town status on May 19, 1942, changing its name to Yoshitomi. Efforts to merge with the town of Buzen have failed to secure popular support.

== Government ==
Yoshitomi has a mayor-council form of government with a directly elected mayor and a unicameral town council of ten members. Yoshitomi, collectively with Buzen and the other municipalities of Chikujō District contributes one member to the Fukuoka Prefectural Assembly. In terms of national politics, the town is part of the Fukuoka 11th district of the lower house of the Diet of Japan.

== Economy ==
Economically, Yoshitomi belongs to the Nakatsu metropolitan area, and according to the 2005 census, approximately 30% of all commuters commute to Nakatsu City. As factories such as Mitsubishi Tanabe Pharmaceutical Factory Co., Ltd. are located here, there is a considerable influx of people from Nakatsu. Commercial fishing also plays a role in the local economy.

== Education ==
Yoshitomi has one public elementary school operated by the town government and one public junior high school operated by a cooperative established between Yoshitomi and Buzen. The town does not have a high school.

== Transportation ==
=== Railways ===
JR Kyushu - Nippō Main Line

- Yoshitomi

=== Highways ===
The town is not on any expressway or National Highway.
