= Taihei, Fukuoka =

Dissolved municipality in Fukuoka prefecture, Japan

Taihei (大平村, Taihei-mura) was a village located in Chikujō District, Fukuoka Prefecture, Japan.

As of 2003, the village had an estimated population of 4,075 and a density of 83.23 persons per km^{2}. The total area was 48.96 km^{2}.

On October 11, 2005, Taihei, along with the village of Shin'yoshitomi (also from Chikujō District), was merged to create the town of Kōge.
