= Shin'yoshitomi, Fukuoka =

Dissolved municipality in Fukuoka prefecture, Japan

Shin'yoshitomi (新吉富村, Shin'yoshitomi-mura) was a village located in Chikujō District, Fukuoka Prefecture, Japan.

As of 2003, the village had an estimated population of 4,081 and a density of 303.65 persons per km^{2}. The total area was 13.44 km^{2}.

On October 11, 2005, Shin'yoshitomi, along with the village of Taihei (also from Chikujō District), was merged to create the town of Kōge.
