= Shida =

Shida may refer to:

- Shida (artist) (born 1990), Australian artist
- Shida, Taipei, a neighborhood of Taipei, Taiwan (師大)
  - The neighborhood's night market, Shida Night Market
- China University of Petroleum (Huadong), a public university in QIngdao, Shandong, China (石大)
- Shihezi University, a public university in Shihezi, Xinjiang, China (石大)
- Shida District, Miyagi, Miyagi, Japan (志田)
- Shida District, Shizuoka, Shizuoka, Japan (志太)
- Shida Hikaru, (志田 光) (born June 1988), Japanese professional wrestler, martial artist, actress, and model

== See also ==
- Shiida (disambiguation)
