= Chikujō, Fukuoka =

Chikujō 築上町
- Town
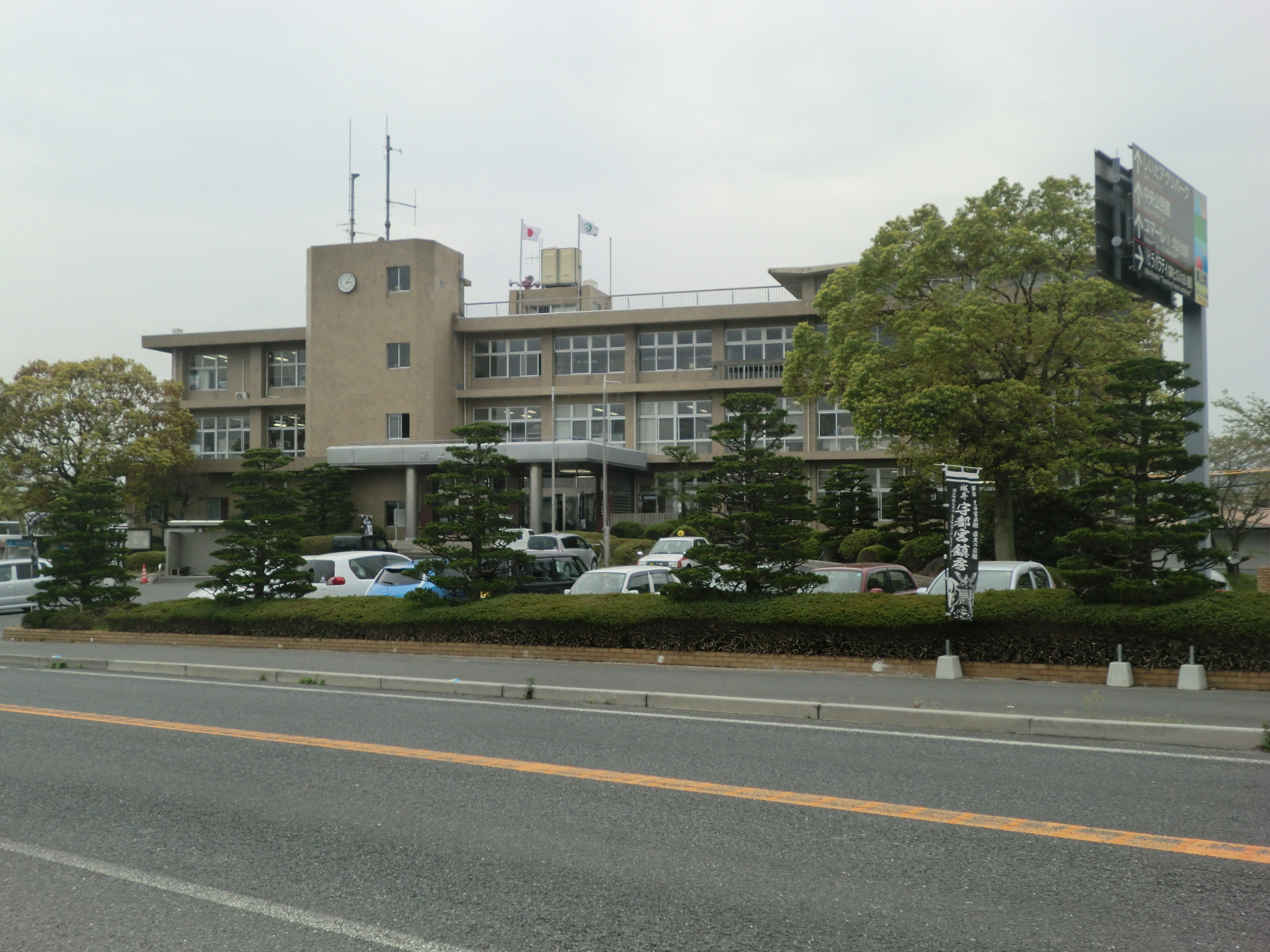
- Chikujō Town Hall

- Flag Chapter
- Interactive map of Chikujō
- Location in Japan
- Coordinates: 33°39′22″N 131°03′22″E
- Country: Japan
- Region: Kyushu
- Prefecture: Fukuoka
- District: Chikujō

Area
  - Total: 119.61 km^{2} (46.18 sq mi)

Population (November 30, 2023)
  - Total: 16,834
  - Density: 140.74/km^{2} (364.52/sq mi)
- Time zone: UTC+09:00 (JST)
- City hall address: 891 Shiida, Chikujō-machi, Chikujō-gun, Fukuoka-ken 829-0392
- Website: Official website
- Symbols
- Flower: Prunus mume
- Tree: Kusunoki

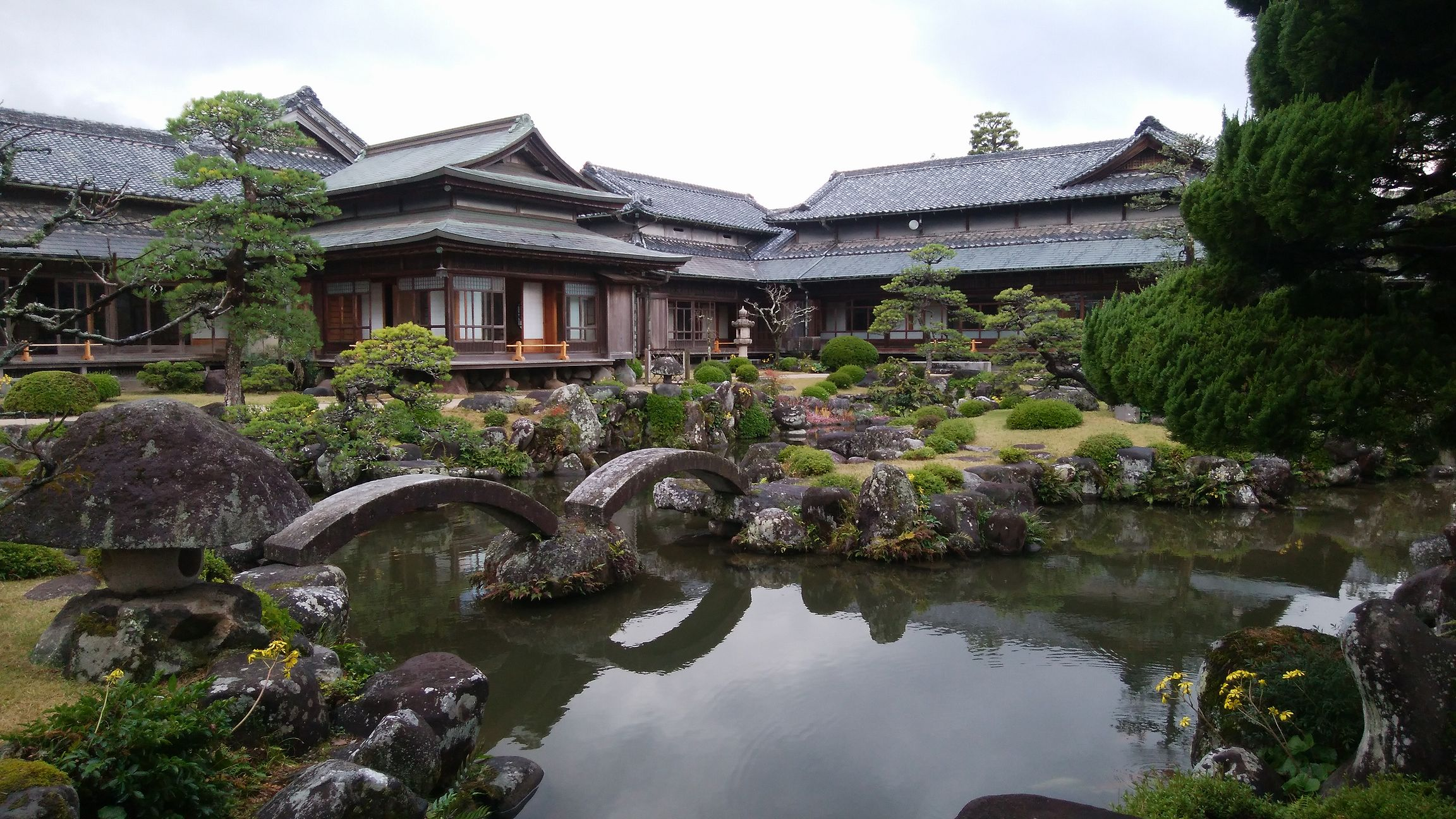
Former Kurauchi Family Gardens

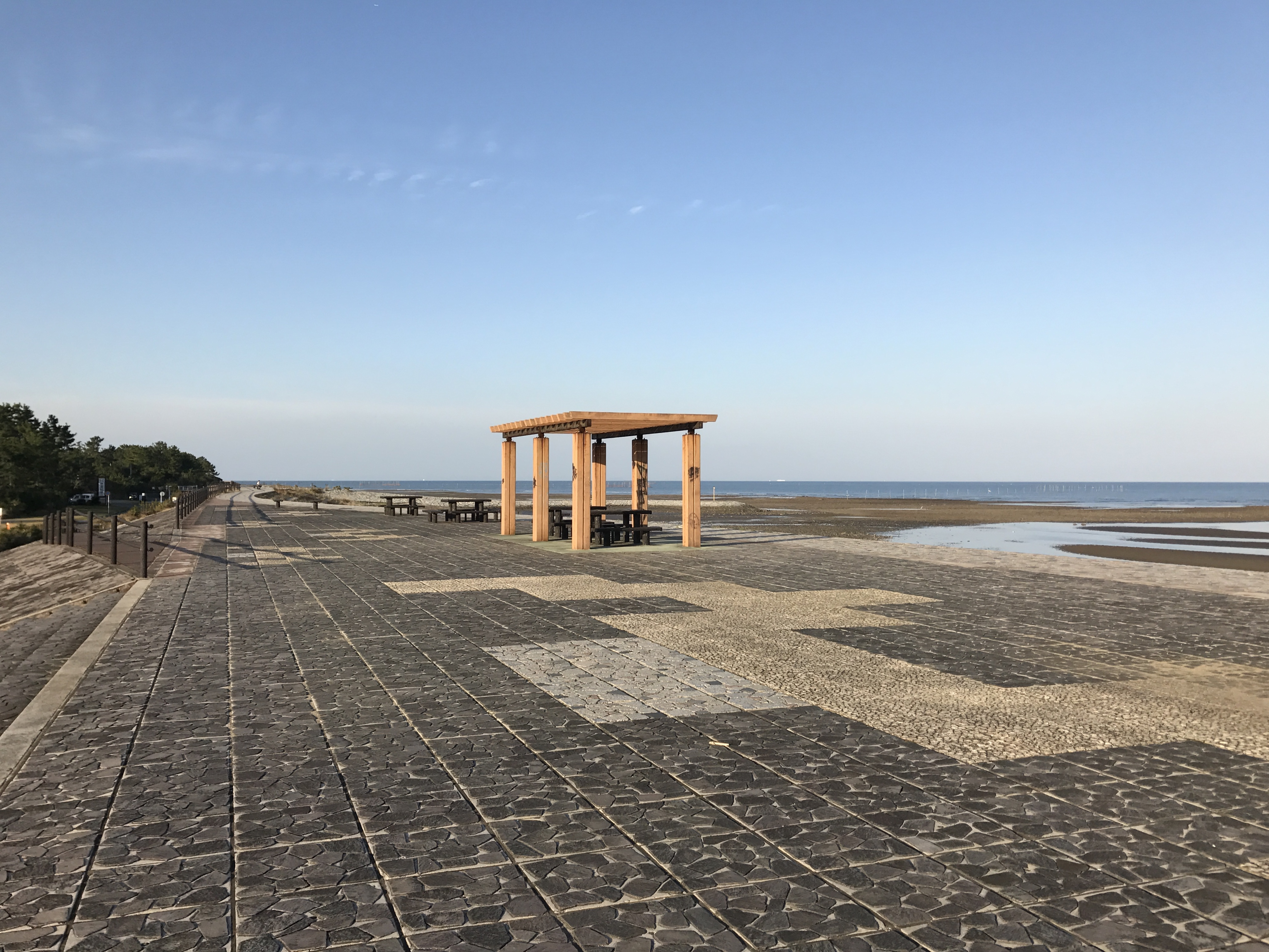
Hamanomiya Beach

Chikujō (築上町, Chikujō-machi) is a town located in Chikujō District, Fukuoka Prefecture, Japan. As of 30 November 2023, the town had an estimated population of 16,834, and a population density of 140 persons per km^{2}. The total area of the town is 119.61 km^{2} (46.18 sq mi).

== Geography ==
Chikujō is located in the eastern part of Fukuoka Prefecture, approximately halfway between Yukuhashi, Fukuoka and Nakatsu, Ōita. In the northern part of the town is the Chikushi Mountains, which includes mountains such as Mount Kubote and Mount Inugadake. The northerneast part of the town faces the Gulf of Suo on the Seto Inland Sea. The town is mostly rural. The town is roughly 75 kilometers from the prefectural capital at Fukuoka and 35 kilometers from Kitakyushu.

=== Neighboring municipalities ===
Fukuoka Prefecture

- Buzen
- Miyako
- Yukuhashi

Ōita Prefecture

- Nakatsu

=== Climate ===
Chikujō has a humid subtropical climate (Köppen Cfa) characterized by warm summers and cool winters with light to no snowfall. The average annual temperature in Chikujō is 15.3 °C. The average annual rainfall is 1663 mm with September as the wettest month. The temperatures are highest on average in August, at around 26.4 °C, and lowest in January, at around 4.3 °C.

=== Demographics ===
Per Japanese census data, the population of Buzen is as shown below

Historical population
Year	Pop.	±%
1940	19,911	—
1950	26,544	+33.3%
1960	26,981	+1.6%
1970	24,894	−7.7%
1980	25,699	+3.2%
1990	24,383	−5.1%
2000	21,848	−10.4%
2010	19,551	−10.5%
2020	17,189	−12.1%

== History ==
The area of Chikujō was part of ancient Buzen Province. The port settlement of Shiida developed as a post station on the Nakatsu Kaidō highway. During the Sengoku period it was mostly under control of the Utsunomiya clan, who were destroyed when the area was awarded to Kuroda Kambe under Tokugawa Ieyasu. The area was partly under the control of Nakatsu Domain, with smaller areas as tenryō territory under direct control of the Tokugawa Shogunate. After the Meiji restoration, the villages of Shiida, Nishikakuta, Katsuragi, Yatsuta, Tsuiki, Kamijiroi, and Shimojoi were established on May 1, 1889, with the creation of the modern municipalities system. Shiida was raised to town status on September 2, 1898. Tsuiki became the site of an Imperial Japanese Navy air base from 1942. Tsuiki was raised to town status on April 1, 1955. Shiida and Tsuiki merged on January 1, 2010, to form the town of Chikujō.

== Government ==
Chikujō has a mayor-council form of government with a directly elected mayor and a unicameral city council of 14 members. Chikujō, collectively with the city of Buzen and the other municipalities of Chikujō District, Fukuoka contributes one member to the Fukuoka Prefectural Assembly. In terms of national politics, the city is part of the Fukuoka 11th district of the lower house of the Diet of Japan.

== Economy ==
Chikujō has a mainly rural economy based on rice cultivation and commercial fishing. The JASDF Tsuiki Air Base is located in the town.

== Education ==
Chikujō has eight public elementary schools and two public junior high schools operated by the city government and one public high school operated by the Fukuoka Prefectural Board of Education.

== Transportation ==
=== Railways ===
JR Kyushu - Nippō Main Line

- Tsuiki - Shiida

=== Highways ===
- Higashikyushu Expressway
- National Route 10

== Local attractions ==
- Former Kurauchi Family Gardens, National Place of Scenic Beauty
- Funasako Kiln ruins, National Historic Site

== Noted people from Chikujō ==
- Masaji Matsuyama, politician
- Shōhōzan Yūya, sumo wrestler
