= Shiida, Fukuoka =

Dissolved municipality in Fukuoka prefecture, Japan

Shiida (椎田町, Shiida-machi) was a town located in Chikujō District, Fukuoka Prefecture, Japan.

== Population ==
As of 2003, the town had an estimated population of 11,944 and a density of 231.03 persons per km^{2}. The total area was 51.70 km^{2}.

== History ==
On January 10, 2006, Shiida, along with the town of Tsuiki (also from Chikujō District), was merged to create the town of Chikujō.
