= Shiida Station =

Railway station in Chikujō, Fukuoka Prefecture, Japan

Shiida Station 椎田駅
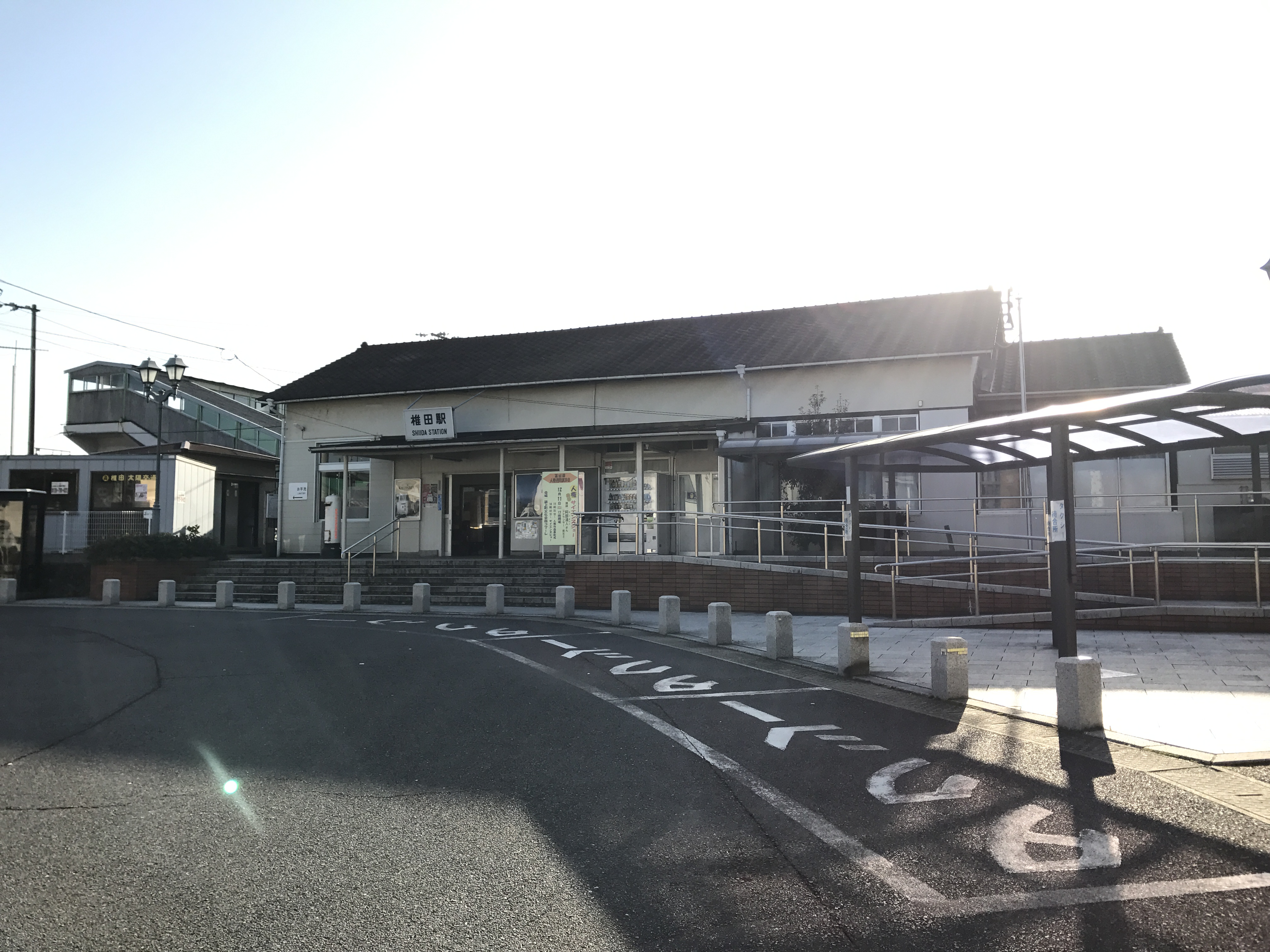
- Shiida Station in November 2016

General information
- Location: 59-1 Shiida, Chikujō-machi, Chikujō-gun, Fukuoka-ken 829-0301; Japan
- Coordinates: 33°39′12″N 131°03′29″E
- Operator: JR Kyushu
- Line: ■ Nippō Main Line
- Distance: 36.9 km from Kokura
- Platforms: 2 side platforms
- Tracks: 2

Other information
- Status: Staffed
- Website: Official website

History
- Opened: 25 September 1897

Passengers
- FY2020: 650 daily

Services
Preceding station	JR Kyushu	Following station
Buzen-Shōe towards Kagoshima	Nippō Main Line	Tsuiki towards Kokura
Location
- Location within Fukuoka Prefecture Location within Japan

Shiida Station (椎田駅, Shiida-eki)is a passenger railway station located in the town of Chikujō, Fukuoka Prefecture, Japan. It is operated by JR Kyushu.

== Lines ==
The station is served by the Nippō Main Line and is located 36.9 km from the starting point of the line at Kokura.

== Layout ==
The station consists of two opposed side platforms serving two tracks connected to the station building by a footbridge. The station is staffed.

=== Platforms ===
1	■ ■ Nippō Main Line	for Unoshima and Nakatsu
2	■ ■ Nippō Main Line	for Yukuhashi and Kokura

== History ==
The station was opened on September 25, 1897, with the opening of the private Hōshū Railway between Yukuhashi and Yanagigaura. The Hōshū railway was acquired by the Kyushu Railway on September 3, 1903. The Kyushu Railway was nationalised on 1 July 1907. Japanese Government Railways (JGR), designated the track as the Hōshū Main Line on 12 October 1909 and expanded it southwards in phases. On 15 December 1923, the Hōshū Main Line was renamed the Nippō Main Line. With the privatization of Japanese National Railways (JNR), the successor of JGR, on 1 April 1987, the station came under the control of JR Kyushu.

== Passenger statistics ==
In fiscal 2020, there was a daily average of 650 boarding passengers at this station.

== Surrounding area ==
- Chikujō Town Hall Tsuiki Branch (formerly Shiida Town Hall)
- Fukuoka Prefectural Chikujonishi High School
- Chikujo Municipal Shiida Elementary School
- Chikujo Municipal Shiida Junior High School

== See also ==
- List of railway stations in Japan
