= Ayazuka Kofun =

- 綾塚古墳 (Japanese)
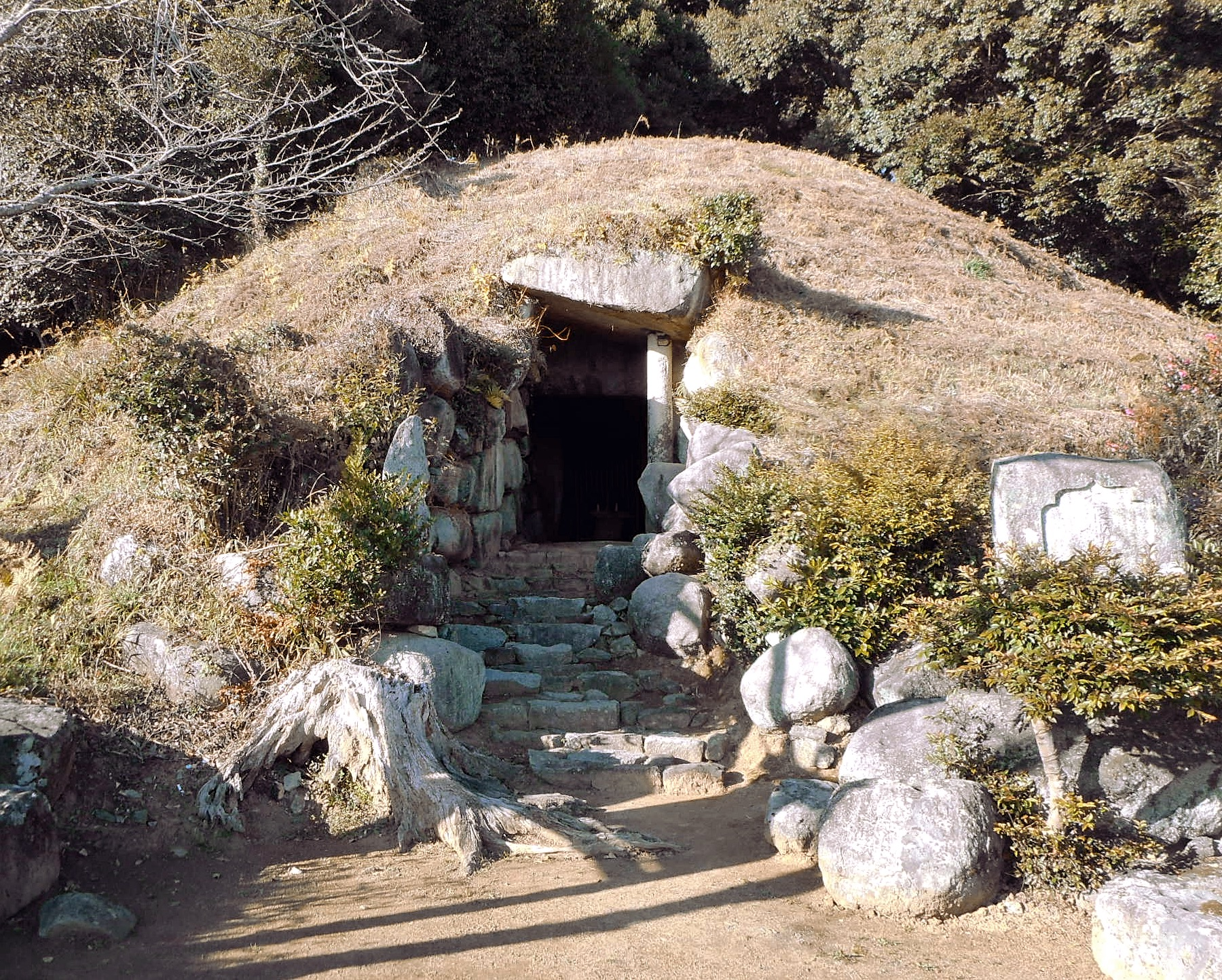
- Ayazuka Kofun

- Ayazuka Kofun Ayazuka Kofun (Japan)
- 33°42′18″N 130°54′59″E
- Type: Kofun
- Periods: Kofun period
- Location: Miyako, Fukuoka, Japan
- Region: Kyushu

History
- Built: c.6th century

Site notes
- Public access: Yes (no facilities)
- National Historic Site of Japan

The Ayazuka Kofun (綾塚古墳) is a Kofun period burial mound, located in the Katsuyama Kuroda neighborhood of the town of Miyako, Miyako District, Fukuoka Prefecture Japan. The tumulus was designated a National Historic Site of Japan in 1973.

== Overview ==
The Ayazuka Kofun is located on the hilly edge of the inland Miyako Plain facing the Gulf of Suo on the Seto Inland Sea. It is an enpun (円墳)-style circular tumulus, with a diameter of 41 meters and height of eight meters, built in two stages. It has a surrounding moat of 4.5 meters in width. The internal structure is a multi-room horizontal stone burial chamber made of megaliths. The horizontal-passage burial chamber has a total length of 21 meters, which is the third largest in Japan after the Mise Maruyama Kofun in Nara Prefecture and Miyajidake Kofun in Fukuoka Prefecture. The almost square rear chamber contains a house-shaped sarcophagus 2.5 meters long, 1.6 meters wide, and 1.2 meters high, placed parallel to the back wall, and there are three rope hanging protrusions on each side. No grave goods have been found inside, but celadon fragments thought to be from the Kamakura period were found in the back chamber, so it is possible that the tomb was robbed during the Kamakura period. The structure and size of the burial chamber suggest that the tumulus was built in the late 6th century, or the late Kofun period.

The tumulus is approximately 20 minutes by car from JR Kyushu Nippō Main Line Yukuhashi Station.

== See also ==
- List of Historic Sites of Japan (Fukuoka)
