= Miyako, Fukuoka =

Miyako みやこ町
- Town
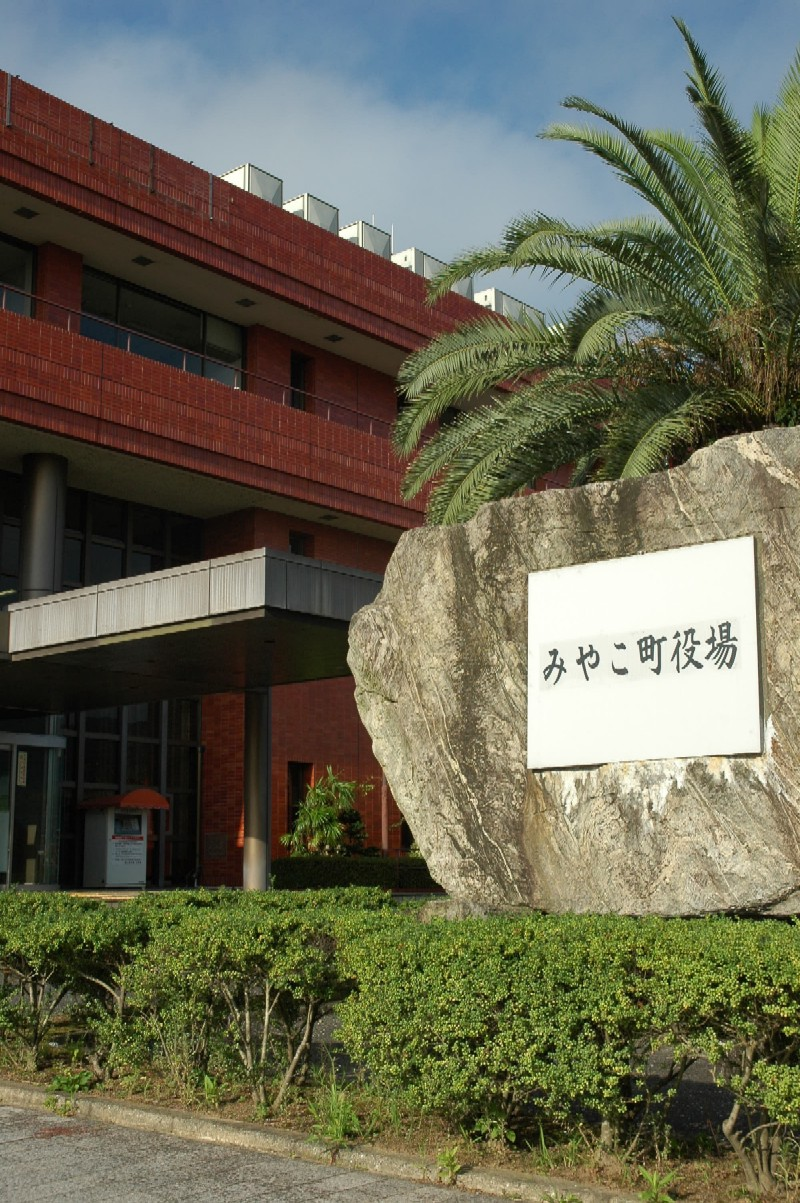
- Miyako Town hall

- Flag Chapter
- Interactive map of Miyako
- Location in Japan
- Coordinates: 33°41′57″N 130°55′13″E
- Country: Japan
- Region: Kyushu
- Prefecture: Fukuoka
- District: Miyako

Area
  - Total: 151.34 km^{2} (58.43 sq mi)

Population (December 31, 2023)
  - Total: 18,049
  - Density: 119.26/km^{2} (308.89/sq mi)
- Time zone: UTC+09:00 (JST)
- City hall address: 960 Ueda, Katsuyama, Miyako-machi, Kyoto-gun, Fukuoka-ken 824-0892
- Website: Official website

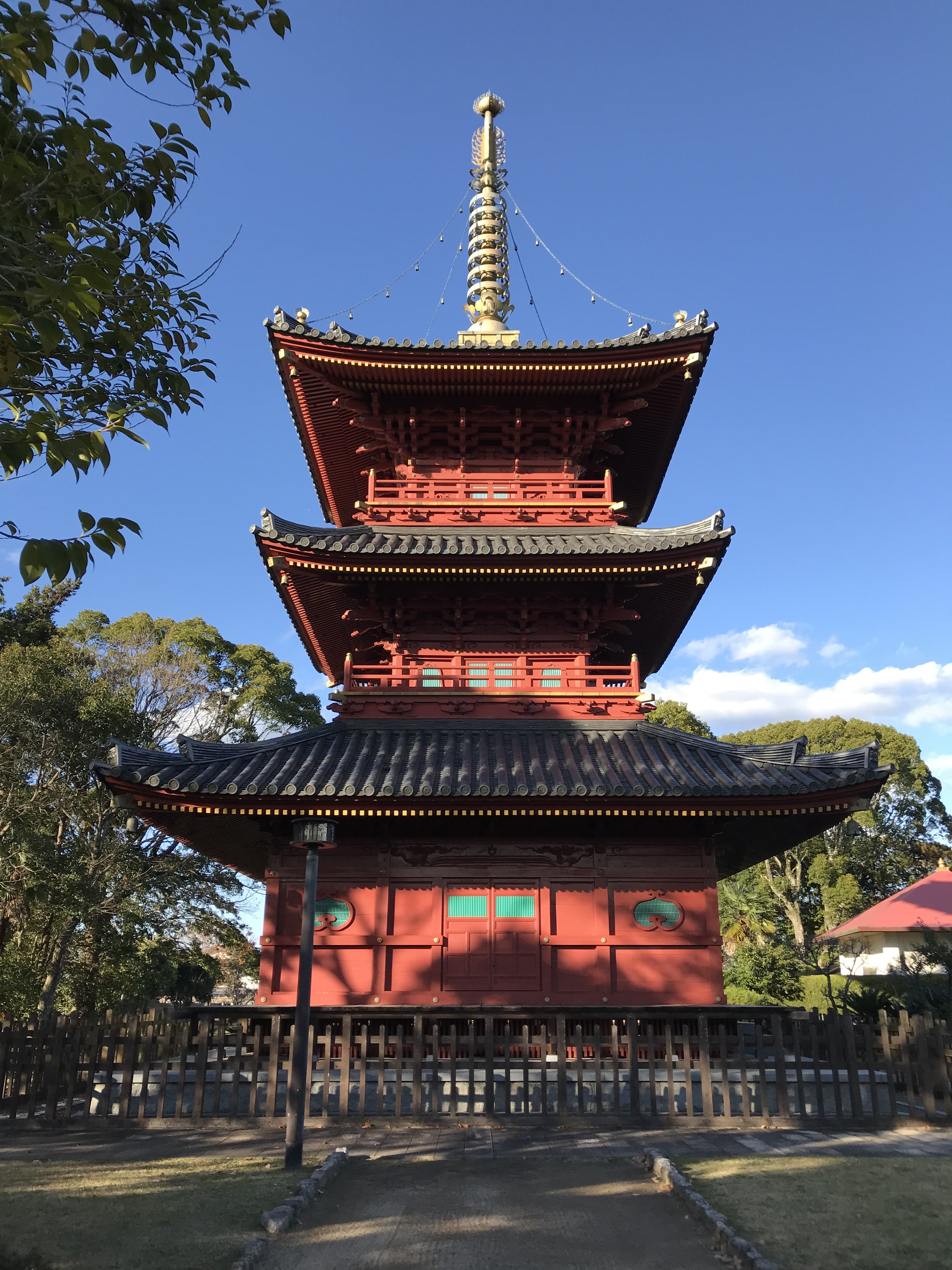
Buzen Kokubun-ji

Miyako (みやこ町, Miyako-machi) is a town located in Miyako District, Fukuoka Prefecture, Japan. As of 31 December 2023, the town had an estimated population of 18,049 in 8405 households, and a population density of 120 persons per km^{2}. The total area of the town is 151.34 km^{2} (58.43 sq mi).

== Geography ==
Miyako is located in northeastern of Fukuoka Prefecture, to the southwest of Yukuhashi City. The southern part of former Saikawa Town has many valleys and mountains, and because it is prone to snowfall in the winter, there used to be a ski resort around Notoge. The area adjacent to Yukuhashi City and the former Toyotsu/Katsuyama Town area are rural areas of the Kyoto Plain, where the Imagawa River and Hara River flow. The northern part is Hiraodai, a karst plateau.

=== Neighboring municipalities ===
Fukuoka Prefecture

- Aka
- Chikujō
- Kawara
- Kitakyushu
- Soeda
- Yukuhashi

Ōita Prefecture

- Nakatsu

=== Climate ===
Miyako has a humid subtropical climate (Köppen Cfa) characterized by warm summers and cool winters with light to no snowfall. The average annual temperature in Miyako is 15.5 °C. The average annual rainfall is 1663 mm with September as the wettest month. The temperatures are highest on average in August, at around 26.5 °C, and lowest in January, at around 4.7 °C.

=== Demographics ===
Per Japanese census data, the population of Miyako is as shown below

Historical population
Year	Pop.	±%
1950	28,095	—
1960	27,147	−3.4%
1970	25,063	−7.7%
1980	26,073	+4.0%
1990	25,423	−2.5%
2000	23,767	−6.5%
2010	21,587	−9.2%
2020	19,349	−10.4%

== History ==
The area of Miyako was part of ancient Buzen Province, and as implied by its name, it was the site of the provincial capital and Buzen Kokubun-ji, both of which are located in the Toyosu neighborhood of the town. During the Edo Period, the area was part of the holdings of Kokura Domain. In 1866, during the Bakumatsu period, the forces of Chōshū Domain attacked and burned down Kokura Castle, forcing the domain to relocated its seat to a jin'ya constructed in Toyosu. In the early Meiji period, it was the location of a battlefield during the Akizuki Rebellion of 1876.

The villages of Isayama, Kubo, and Kuroda within Miyako District, Fukuoka and the villages of Toyotsu, Harigo, Setsumaru, Higashisaikawa, Nishisaikawa, and Minamisaikawa within Nakatsu District, Fukuoka were established on May 1, 1889, with the creation of the modern municipalities system. Nakatsu District was absorbed by Miyako District in 1896. On February 1, 1905, Higashisaikawa, Nishisaikawa, and Minamisaikawa merged to become Saigawa Village, which was raised to town status on February 11, 1943. On April 10, 1943, Toyotsu annexed Setsumaru. Toyotsu then merged with Harigo on March 1, 1955, to form the town of Toyotsu. On the same day, Isayama, Kubō, and Kuroda merged to form Katsuyama Town. On March 20, 2006, Toyotsu, Saigawa, and Katsuyama merged to form the town of Miyako.

== Government ==
Miyako has a mayor-council form of government with a directly elected mayor and a unicameral town council of 14 members. Miyako, collectively with the town of Kanda contributes one member to the Fukuoka Prefectural Assembly. In terms of national politics, the town is part of the Fukuoka 11th district of the lower house of the Diet of Japan.

== Economy ==
Miyako has a mainly rural economy based on agriculture. There is very little in terms of industry or commerce. Parts of the town are within commuting distance of Yukuhashi.

== Education ==
Miyako has seven public elementary schools and three public junior high schools operated by the town government and one combined public middle/high school operated by the Fukuoka Prefectural Board of Education.

== Transportation ==
=== Railways ===
Heisei Chikuhō Railway - Tagawa Line

- Shin-Toyotsu - Higashi-Saigawa-Sanshirō - Saigawa - Sakiyama

=== Highways ===
- Higashikyushu Expressway
- National Route 10
- National Route 201
- National Route 496
- National Route 500

== Local attractions ==
- Ayazuka Kofun, National Historic Site
- Buzen Kokubun-ji, National Historic Site
- Buzen Kokufu Park
- Goshogotani Kōgoishi, National Historic Site
- Tachibanazuka Kofun, National Historic Site
