= Buzen Kokubun-ji =

Buddhist temple ruins in Miyako, Fukuoka, Japan

Buzen -Kokubun-ji
- 豊前国分寺 (Japanese)
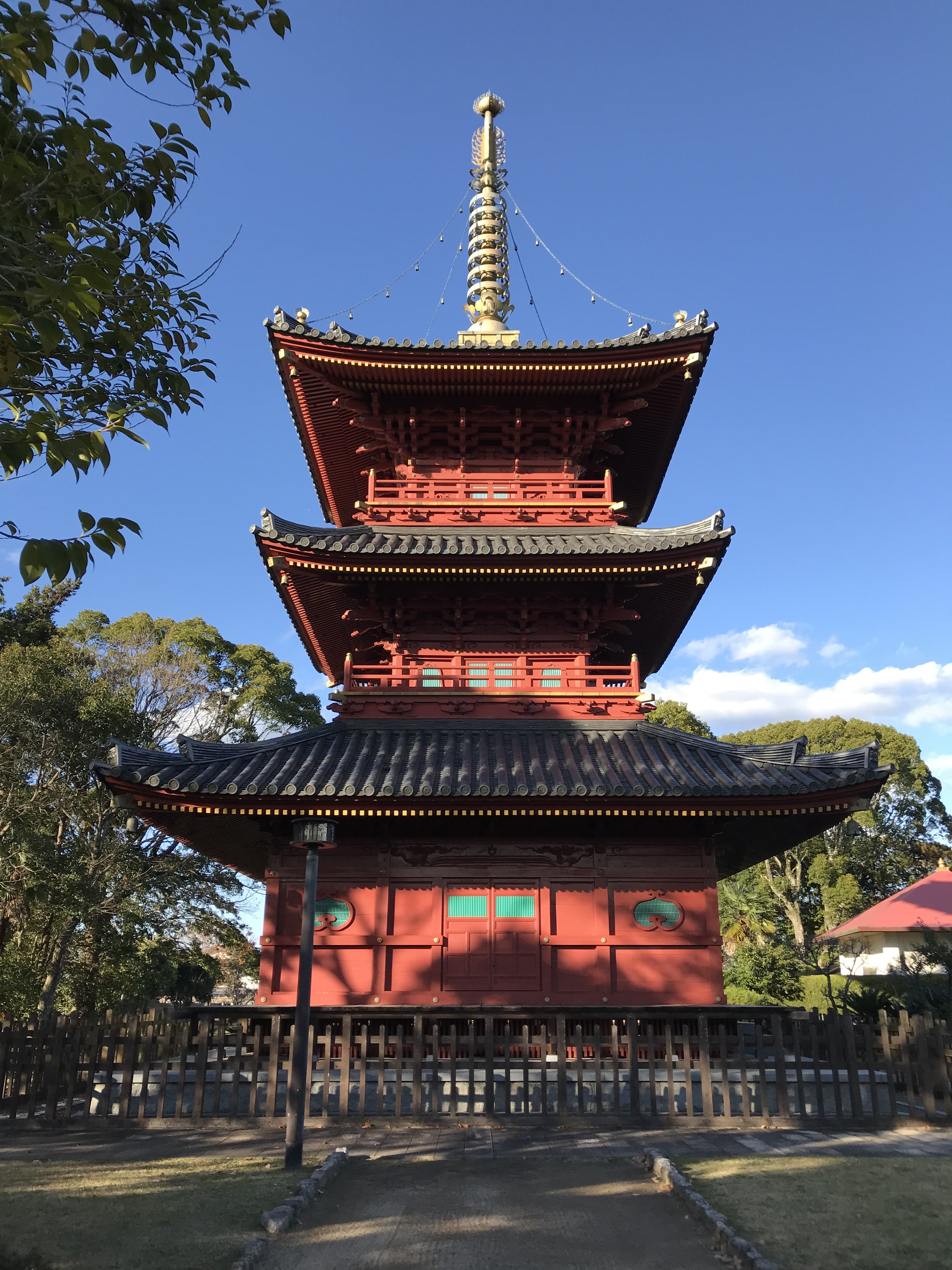
- Buzen Kokubun-ji

- Buzen Kokubun-ji Buzen Kokubun-ji (Japan)
- 33°40′45″N 130°58′50″E
- Type: Kokubun-ji ruins
- Periods: Nara period
- Location: Miyako, Fukuoka, Japan
- Region: Kyushu

History
- Built: c.8th century

Site notes
- Public access: Yes
- National Historic Site of Japan

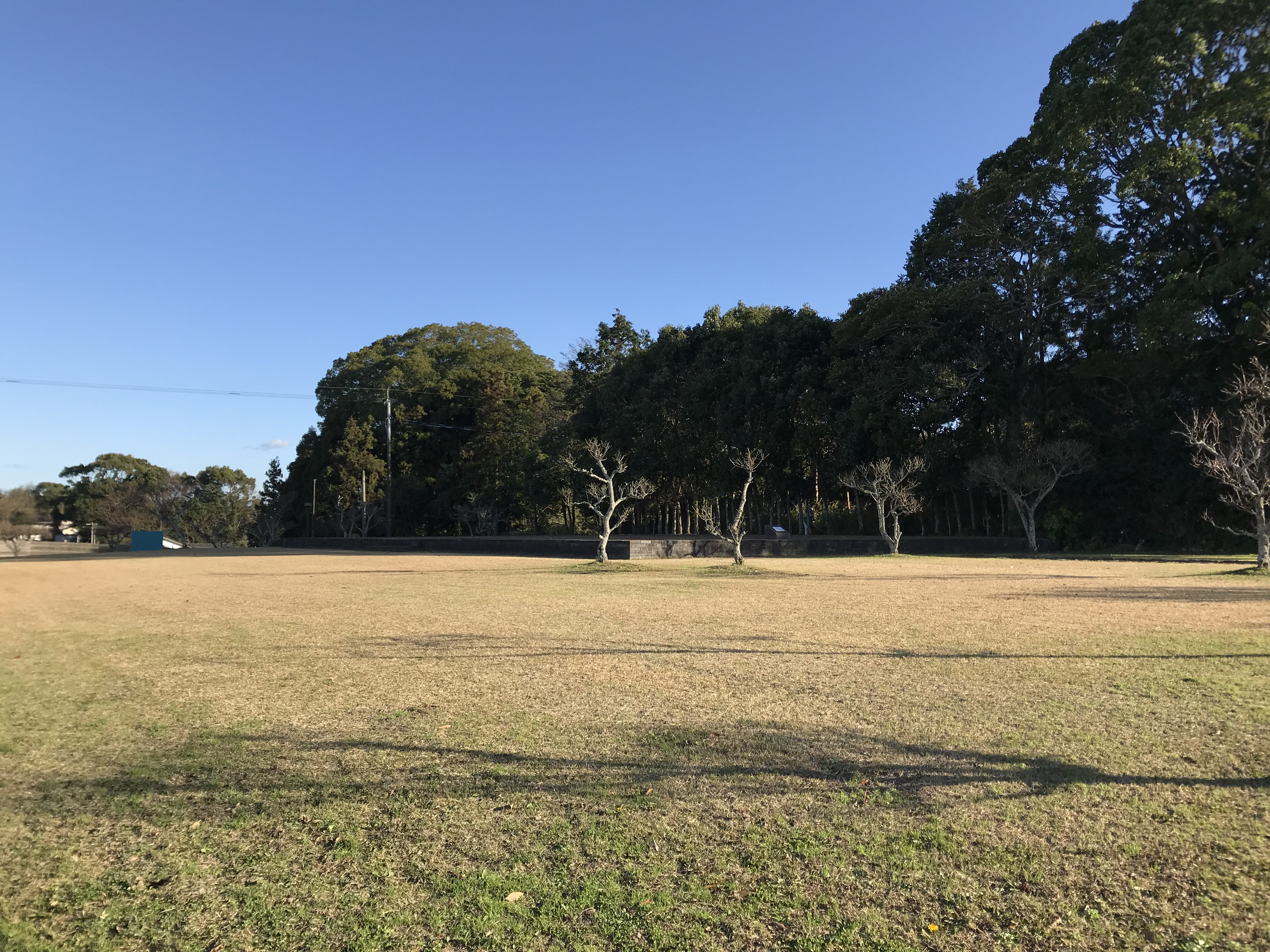
Site of the Lecture Hall

The Buzen Kokubun-ji (豊前国分寺) was a Buddhist temple located in the Kokubu neighborhood of the town of Miyako, Fukuoka, Japan. It was one of the provincial temples per the system established by Emperor Shōmu during the Nara period (710 – 794) for the purpose of promoting Buddhism as the national religion of Japan and standardising imperial rule over the provinces. The temple no longer exists, but its ruins were designated as a National Historic Site in 1976.

== Overview ==
The Shoku Nihongi records that in 741 AD, as the country recovered from a major smallpox epidemic, Emperor Shōmu ordered that a state-subsidized monastery and nunnery be established in every province for the promotion of Buddhism and to enhance political unification per the new ritsuryō system. These were the kokubunji (国分寺). The temples were constructed per a more-or-less standardized template, and were each to be staffed by twenty clerics who would pray for the state's protection. The associated provincial nunneries (kokubunniji) were on a smaller scale, each housing ten nuns to pray for the atonement of sins. This system declined when the capital was moved from Nara to Kyoto in 794 AD.

Buzen Kokubun-ji was located on a diluvial plateau between the Imagawa and Haraigawa rivers. This was the center of ancient Buzen Province, and in the surrounding area is what are presumed to be the ruins of the provincial capital, the ruins of the Buzen Kokubun-niji nunnery, and the ruins of the Tokumasa tile kiln. Based on the description in the Shoku Nihongi written at the end of the 8th century, it is believed that Buzen Kokubun-ji was completed by 756 AD at the latest. From the topography and land divisions that remain in the surrounding area it is possible to estimate that the temple area was approximately 218 meters square. Much of the temple's layout remains uncertain, but two archaeological excavations have found the foundations of the Lecture Hall and the remnants of a large ditch that surrounded the site from the Kamakura period to the Muromachi period. The foundations of what are believed to be the remains of a cloister have also been found. The temple was burned down by the Sengoku period warlord Ōtomo Sōrin during the Tenshō era (1572–1592), but it was almost restored during the Genroku era (1688–1704) of the Edo period. The three-story Pagoda now on the site was completed in 1899.

The temple site is approximately 30 minutes on foot from Toyotsu Station on the Heisei Chikuhō Railway Tagawa Line.

== See also ==
- List of Historic Sites of Japan (Fukuoka)
- provincial temple
