= Tsuiki Air Field =

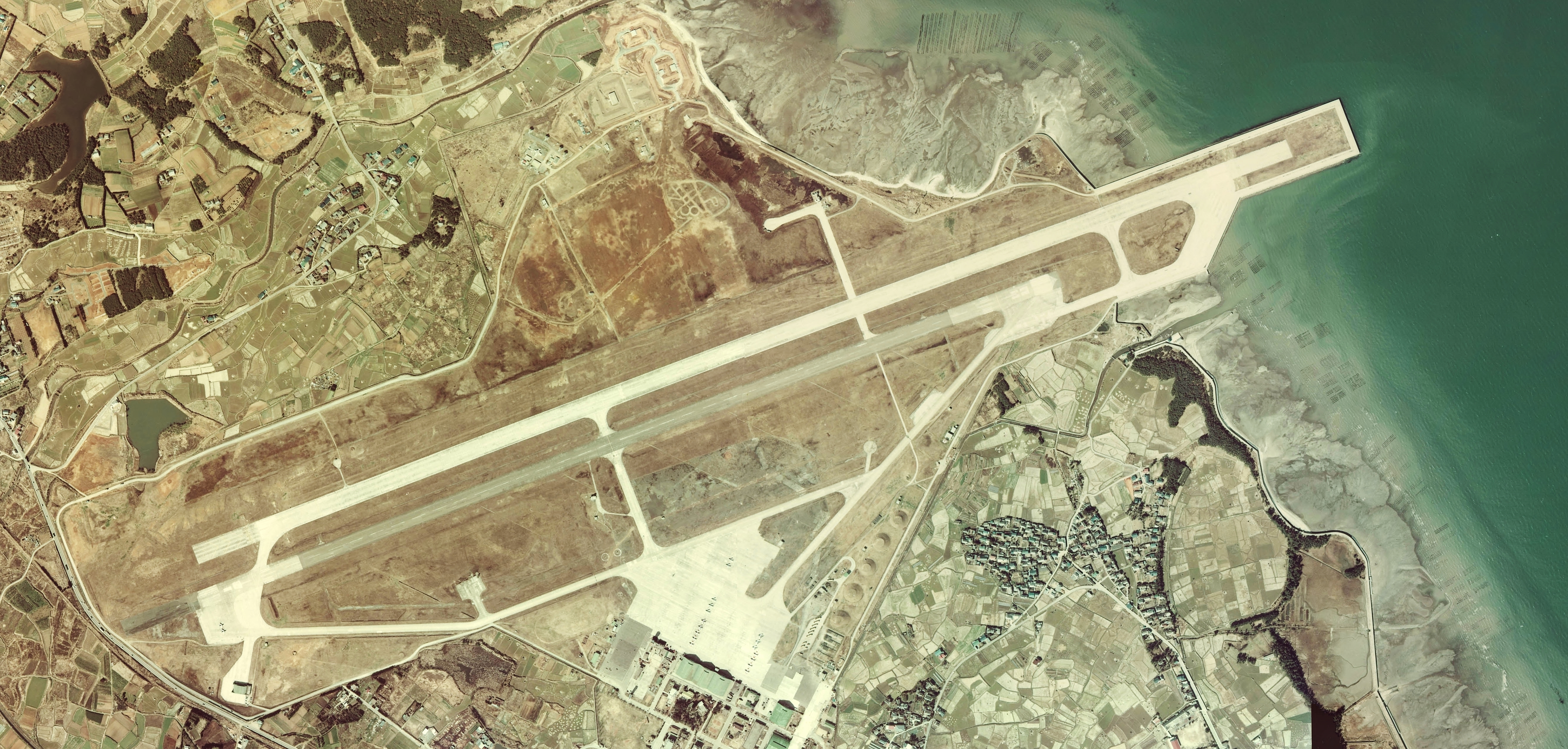
- IATA: none; ICAO: RJFZ

Summary
- Airport type: Military
- Operator: Japan Air Self-Defense Force
- Location: Tsuiki, Fukuoka, Japan
- Elevation AMSL: 55 ft (17 m)
- Coordinates: 33°41′06″N 131°02′25″E

Map
- Location in Japan

Runways
Direction	Length		Surface
Direction	m	ft	Surface
07/25	2,400	7,874	Concrete
- Source: Japanese AIP at AIS Japan

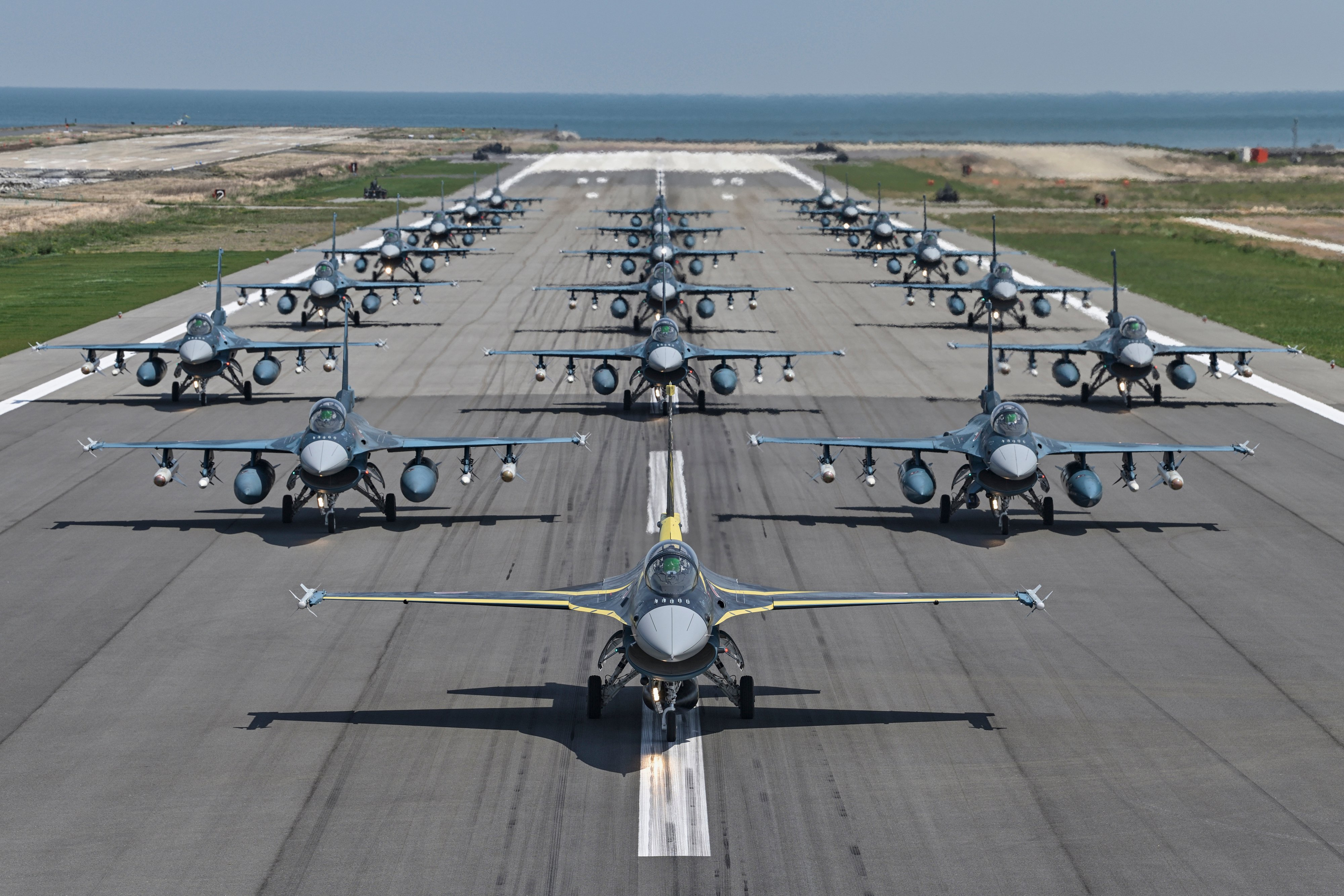
JASDF 8th Tactical Fighter Squadron Mitsubishi F-2 at Tsuiki

Tsuiki Air Field (築城飛行場, Tsuiki Hikōjō) (ICAO: RJFZ) is a military aerodrome of the Japan Air Self-Defense Force Tsuiki Airbase (築城基地, Tsuiki Kichi). It is located on the northeast coast of Kyūshū and its borders straddle the municipalities of Tsuiki, Yukuhashi, and Miyako, Japan. The runway extends from west-southwest to east-northeast, with a portion protruding approximately 300 meters into the Gulf of Suo at the western end of the Seto Inland Sea. The JR Kyushu Nippō Main Line runs along the southern border of the base. Since March 2008, the base handles most of the air traffic control operations at Kitakyushu Airport and Yamaguchi Ube Airport.

== History ==
Tsuiki Airfield was originally built by the Imperial Japanese Army Air Force (IJAAF) during World War II and was opened on October 1, 1942. In 1945, it was used for Operation Kikusui kamikaze operations using Yokosuka P1Y "Ginga" bombers. On August 9, 1945, ten fighters scrambled from Tsuiki unsuccessfully attempted to intercept the USAAF B-29 Superfortress bomber en route to the atomic bombing of Nagasaki. The airfield was attacked by United States Army Air Force's Fifth Air Force B-24 Liberator and A-26 Invader bombers on 7 August 1945.

Not rebuilt in the immediate postwar era, the old IJAAF airfield was pressed into use during the early days of the Korean War, when the United States Air Force (USAF) 8th Fighter Group moved F-51 Mustangs to Tsuiki in mid-August 1950 for operations over the South Korean Pusan Perimeter. When airfields became available in South Korea, the unit moved to Suwon Air Base to conduct ground support operations. In addition, the 35th Fighter Group, one of the first USAF units deployed to South Korea, pulled out of the line for F-51 replacement aircraft and personnel R&R at Tsuiki in mid-August. In October, it returned to the South Korean battlefield, moving with the 8th FG to Suwon AB. The 18th FBG also used Tsuiki for F-86 aircraft overhaul and inspections. After its reactivation, Tsuiki Air Base became a second-line USAF facility for the remainder of the Korean War, hosting several weather squadrons, with the 6169th Air Base Squadron being the main host support unit, and supervising construction of new runways and support buildings. After the combat in Korea ended in 1953, it remained a reserve base until being returned to Japanese control in June 1957.

Even before its return to Japanese control, the fledgling Japan Air Self-Defense Force began using Tsuiki from January 1955 for pilot training, using the Lockheed T-33 and North American F-86. In 1957, the JASDF 3rd Pilot School was formed. This was renamed the 16th Flight Education Group in 1959 and became the 8th Air Wing, consisting of the 6th Squadron and 10th Squadron (both equipped with the F-86F) in December 1964. The 10th Squadron was abolished in April 1977 and reactivated as the new 304th Squadron in August of the same year with the F-4EJ Phantom. The 6th Squadron transitioned to the Mitsubishi F-1 in 1981 and the 304th Squadron to the F-15EJ in January 1990. The 6th Squadron transitioned to the Mitsubishi F-2 in August 2004. On September 11, 2008 an F-15EJ of the 304th Squadron crashed into the Sea of Japan due to a power system failure during training. The pilot successfully ejected, but the accident ended the 304th Squadron's 38 years without a single major accident. The 304th Squadron was transferred to Okinawa in 2016 and replaced by the 8th Tactical Fighter Squadron from Misawa Air Base the same year.

== Tenant units ==
Japan Air Self-Defense Force Western Air Defense Force

- 8th Air Wing
  - 6th Tactical Fighter Squadron (F-2A/B)
  - 8th Tactical Fighter Squadron (F-2A/B)
- 2nd Air Defence Missile Group
  - 7th Anti-Aircraft Squadron (MIM-104 Patriot)
