= Tsuiki Station =

Railway station in Chikujō, Fukuoka Prefecture, Japan

Tsuiki Station 築城駅
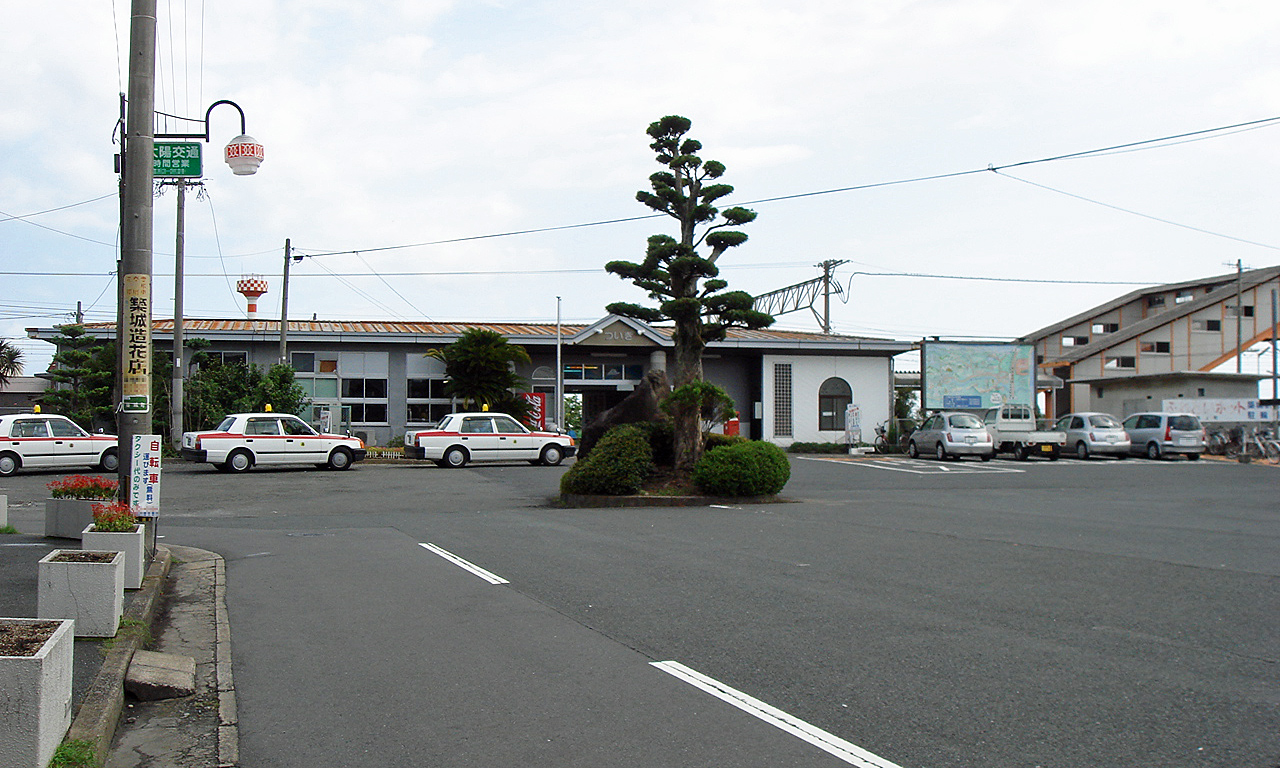
- Tsuiki Station in August 2006

General information
- Location: Higashitsuiki, Chikujō-machi, Chikujō-gun, Fukuoka-ken 829-0101; Japan
- Coordinates: 33°40′23″N 131°02′16″E
- Operator: JR Kyushu
- Line: ■ Nippō Main Line
- Distance: 33.9 km from Kokura
- Platforms: 2 side platform
- Tracks: 2

Other information
- Status: Staffed
- Website: Official website

History
- Opened: 19 June 1933

Passengers
- FY2020: 520 daily

Services
Preceding station	JR Kyushu	Following station
Shiida towards Kagoshima	Nippō Main Line	Shindembaru towards Kokura
Location
- Location within Fukuoka Prefecture Location within Japan

Tsuiki Station (築城駅, Tsuiki-eki) is a passenger railway station located in the town of Chikujō, Fukuoka Prefecture, Japan. It is operated by JR Kyushu.

== Lines ==
The station is served by the Nippō Main Line and is located 33.9 km from the starting point of the line at Kokura.

== Layout ==
The station consists of two opposed side platforms serving two tracks connected to the station building by a footbridge. The station is staffed.

=== Platforms ===
1	■ ■ Nippō Main Line	for Yukuhashi and Kokura
2	■ ■ Nippō Main Line	for Unoshima and Nakatsu

== History ==
The station was opened 19 June 1933 as an additional station on the existing track of the Nippō Main Line. The original station building was destroyed in a fire which started in a nearby sawmill in 1955.

== Passenger statistics ==
In fiscal 2020, there was a daily average of 520 boarding passengers at this station.

== Surrounding area ==
- Chikujō Town Hall Tsuiki Branch (formerly Tsuiki Town Hall)
- JASDF Tsuiki Air Base
- Japan National Route 10

== See also ==
- List of railway stations in Japan
