= Yoshitomi Station (Fukuoka) =

Railway station in Yoshitomi, Fukuoka Prefecture, Japan

Yoshitomi Station 吉富駅
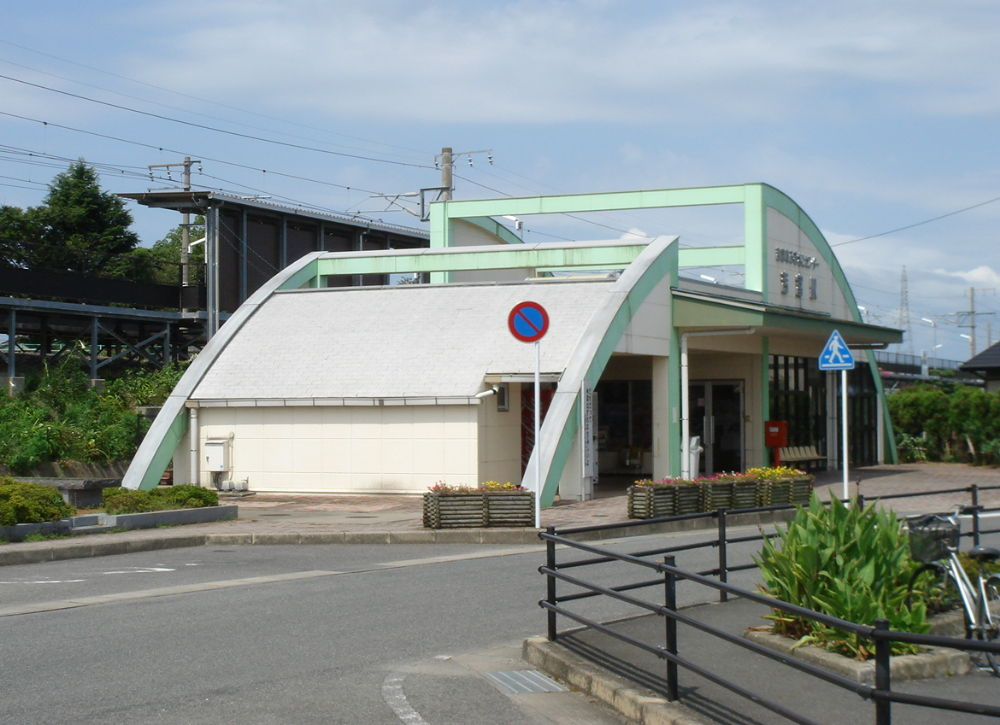
- Yoshitomi Station building in August 2006

General information
- Location: Hirotsu 351-2, Yoshitomi-cho, Chikujo-gun, Fukuoka-ken; Japan
- Coordinates: 33°36′17″N 131°10′26″E
- Operator: JR Kyushu
- Line: ■ Nippō Main Line
- Distance: 50.0 km from Kokura
- Platforms: 2 side platforms
- Tracks: 2

Other information
- Status: Unstaffed
- Website: Official website

History
- Opened: 20 April 1995

Passengers
- FY2020: 257 daily

Services
Preceding station	JR Kyushu	Following station
Nakatsu towards Kagoshima	Nippō Main Line	Mikekado towards Kokura
Location
- Location within Fukuoka Prefecture Location within Japan

Yoshitomi Station (吉富駅, Yoshitomi-eki) is a passenger railway station located in the town of Yoshitomi, Fukuoka Prefecture, Japan. It is operated by JR Kyushu.

== Lines ==
The station is served by the Nippō Main Line and is located 50.0 km from the starting point of the line at Kokura.

== Layout ==
The station consists of two opposed side platforms serving two tracks which are located on an embankment. The platforms, which are curved, have an effective length of 165 meters and can accommodate 8-car trains. The station is unattended.

=== Platforms ===
1	■ ■ Nippō Main Line	for Nakatsu and Yanagigaura
2	■ ■ Nippō Main Line	for Yukuhashi and Kokura

== History ==
The station was opened on 20 April 1995 as an additional station on the existing track of the Nippō Main Line, and was built by private donations.

== Passenger statistics ==
In fiscal 2020, there was a daily average of 257 boarding passengers.

== Surrounding area ==
- Yoshitomi Town Hall
- Yoshitomi Town Yoshitomi Elementary School

== See also ==
- List of railway stations in Japan
