= Buzen Province =

Former province of Japan

Map of Japanese provinces (1868) with Buzen Province highlighted

Buzen Province (豊前国, Buzen no Kuni; Japanese pronunciation: [bɯ̈́.(d͡)zè̞ɴ̀, -(d͡)zè̞ǹ nò̞ kɯ̈̀.ɲ̟ì]) was a province of Japan in the area of northeastern Kyūshū, corresponding to part of southeastern Fukuoka Prefecture and northwestern Ōita Prefecture. Buzen bordered on Bungo to the south, and Chikuzen to the north and west. Its abbreviated form name was Hōshū (豊州) (a name which it shared with Bungo Province), although it was also called Nihō (二豊). In terms of the Gokishichidō system, Buzen was one of the provinces of the Saikaidō circuit. Under the Engishiki classification system, Buzen was ranked as one of the "superior countries" (上国) in terms of importance, and one of the "far countries" (遠国) in terms of distance from the capital.

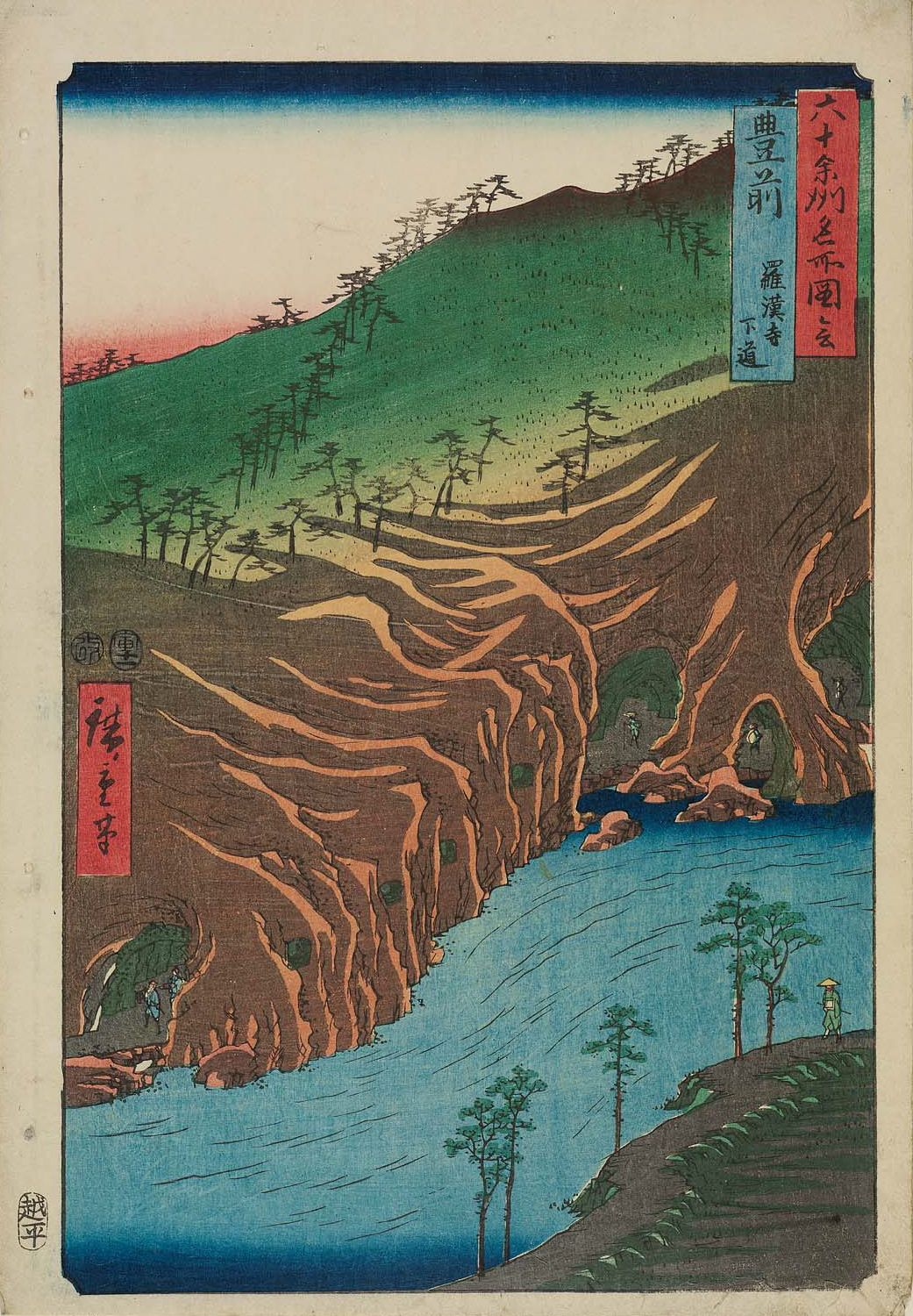
Hiroshige ukiyo-e "Bungo" in "The Famous Scenes of the Sixty States" (六十余州名所図会), depicting the route to Rakan-ji temple in 1856

== History ==
=== Early history ===
During the Kofun period, the area of Buzen had two main power centers: Toyouni in the northwest and Usa-kuni in the southeast (the area around what is now Usa, each of which was ruled by a kuni no miyatsuko. By the Asuka period, the area had been consolidated into a single province called Toyo Province, also called Toyokuni no Michi no Shiri. After the Taika Reforms and the establishment of the Ritsuryō system in 701, Toyo Province was divided into Bungo and Buzen Provinces.

The kokufu of Buzen was located in Toyotsu, now part of Miyako, Fukuoka, and its ruins have been located and are now a National Historic Site. The Buzen Kokubun-ji was also located in the same area. The of ichinomiya of Buzen Province is Usa Jingū, commonly known as "Usa Hachimangū", located in Usa.

=== Edo Period and early modern period ===
Buzen was largely dominated by Kokura Domain, ruled by the Ogasawara clan under the Tokugawa shogunate, with a smaller area under the rule of Nakatsu Domain.

Bakumatsu period domains
Name	Clan	Type	kokudaka	Notes
Kokura	Ogasawara	Fudai	150,000 koku	renamed Kawara Domain in 1869; Toyotsu Domain in 1850
Nakatsu	Okudaira	Fudai	100,000 koku	
Kokura Shinden	Ogasawara	Fudai	10,000 koku	Renamed Chizuka Domain in 1869

During the Boshin War, Kokura Castle was occupied by the forces of Chōshū Domain, and the seat of Kokura Domain was transferred to Kawara Domain (香春藩). It was renamed Toyotsu Domain (豊津藩) in 1870. In 1869, Kokura Shinden Domain was renamed Chizuka Domain (千束藩). The previous year, hatamoto territory in the province was transferred to Hita Prefecture, followed by Usa Jingu territory and Chōshū Domain in 1869. On the other hand, former tenryō in Shimoge District and Usa District became part of Tsushima Izuhara Domain (千束藩) in January 1870. With the abolition of the han system in August 1871, the former domains became Toyotsu, Senzoku, Nakatsu, and Izuhara prefectures, which were merged at the end of the year to form Kokura Prefecture. In April 1876, Kokura Prefecture was incorporated into Fukuoka Prefecture, but in August of the same year, the two southernmost districts (Usa District and Shimoge District) of former Buzen Province were transferred to Ōita Prefecture. The name "Buzen" continued to persist for some purposes. For example, Buzen is explicitly recognized in the 1894 treaties with the United States and the United Kingdom.

Per the early Meiji period Kyudaka kyuryo Torishirabe-chō (旧高旧領取調帳), an official government assessment of the nation's resources, Buzen Province had 776 villages with a total kokudaka of 363,940 koku. Bungo Province consisted of:

Districts of Bungo Province
District	kokudaka	villages	Controlled by	Notes
Usa District (宇佐郡)	77,483 koku	241 villages	Tenryō, Nakatsu, Shimabara, Usa Jingū	dissolved
Shimoge (下毛郡)	47,593 koku	98 villages	Tenryō, Nakatsu	dissolved
Kiku (企救郡)	45,797 koku	110 villages	Kokura	
Tagawa (田川郡)	54,752 koku	64 villages	Kokura	
Miyako (京都郡)	34,617 koku	71 villages	Kokura	absorbed Nakatsu District on February 26, 1896
Nakatsu (仲津郡)	42,586 koku	76 villages	Kokura	merged into Miyako District on February 26, 1896
Tsuiki (築城郡)	23,033 koku	41 villages	Kokura	merged with Kōge to become Chikujō District on February 26, 1896
Kōge (上毛郡)	38,074 koku	75 villages	Kokura. Nakatsu	merged with Tsuiki to become Chikujō District on February 26, 1896

== Gallery ==
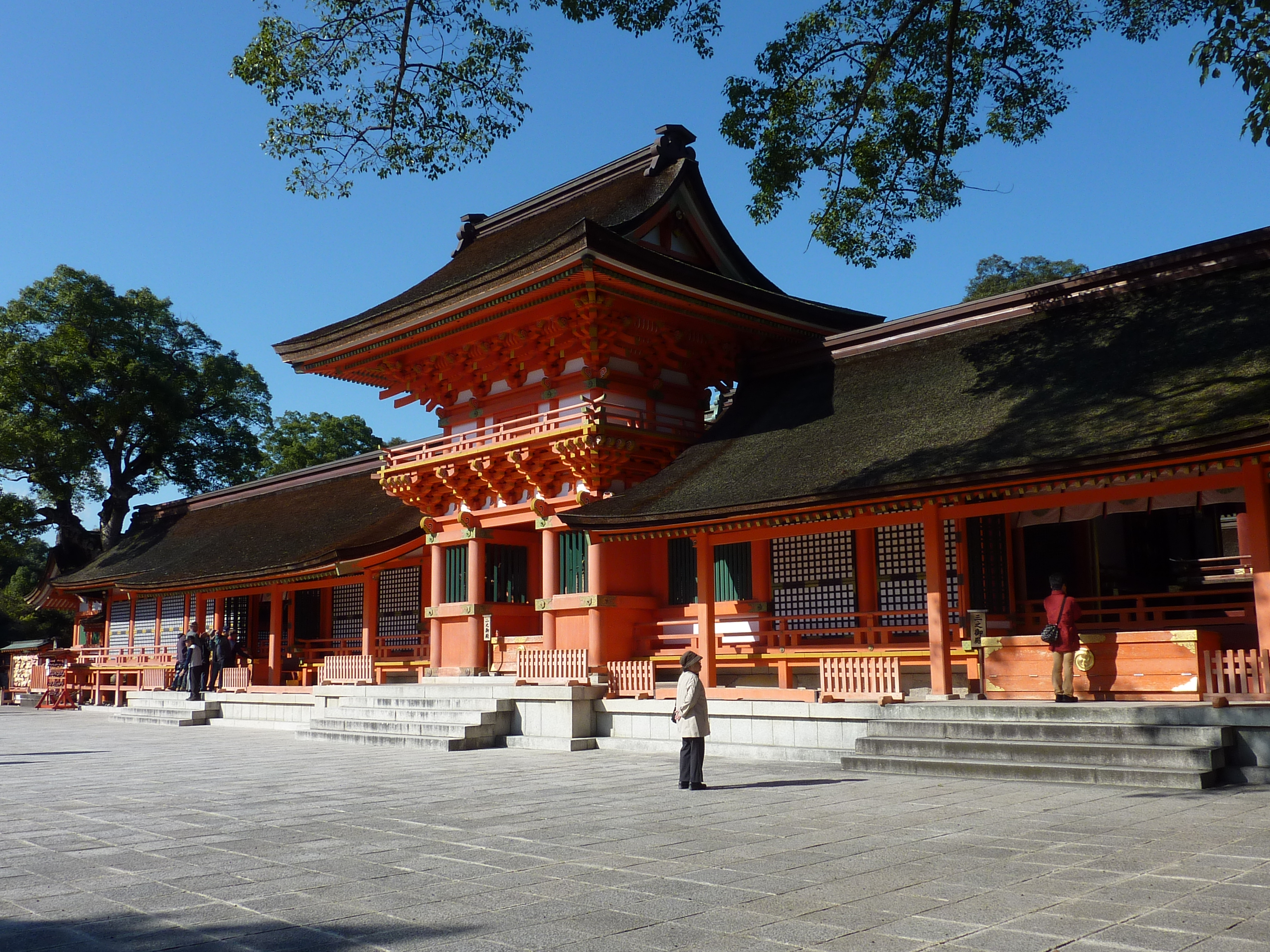
Usa Jingu, the ichinomiya of the province

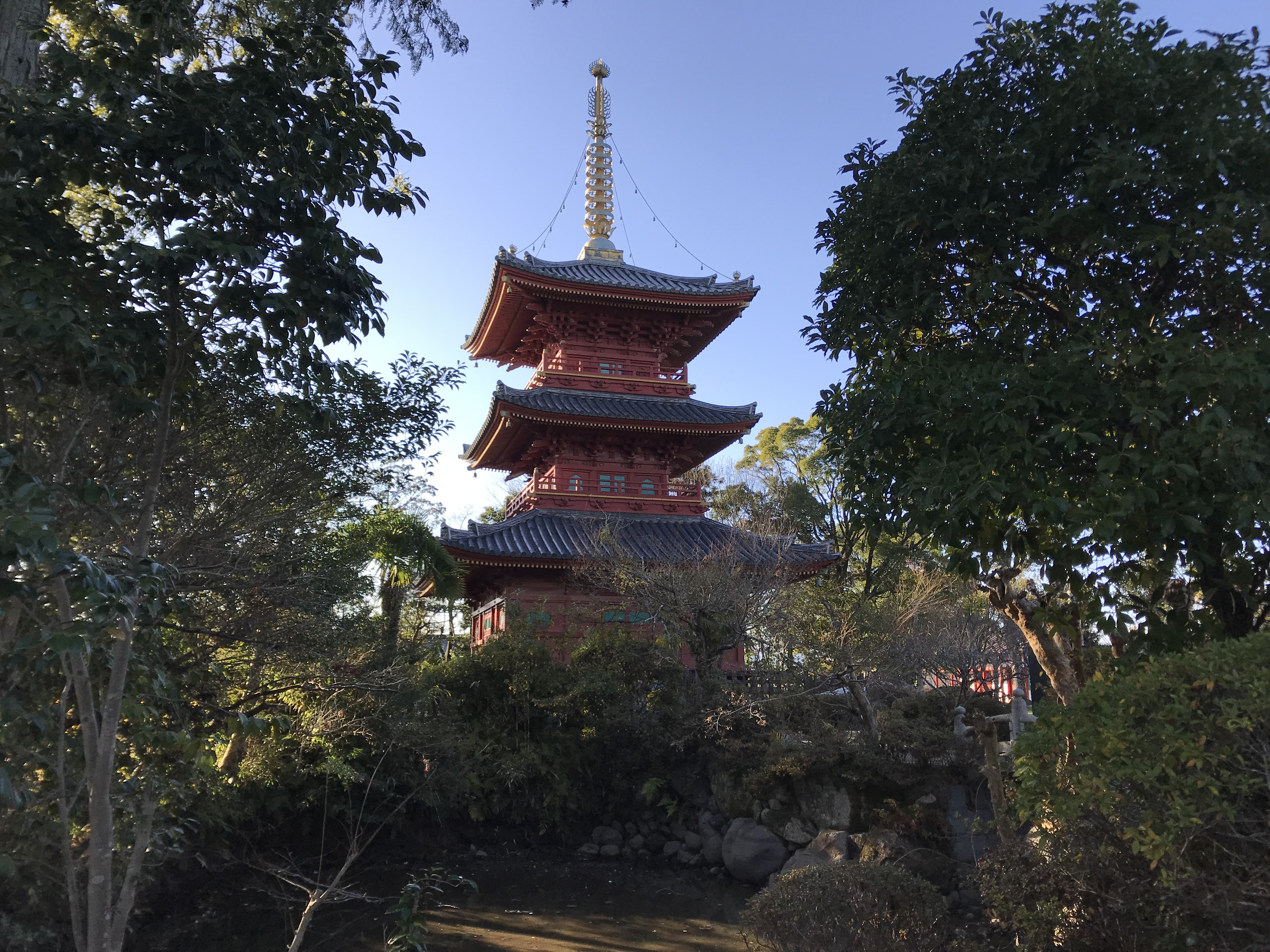
Buzen Kokubun-ji

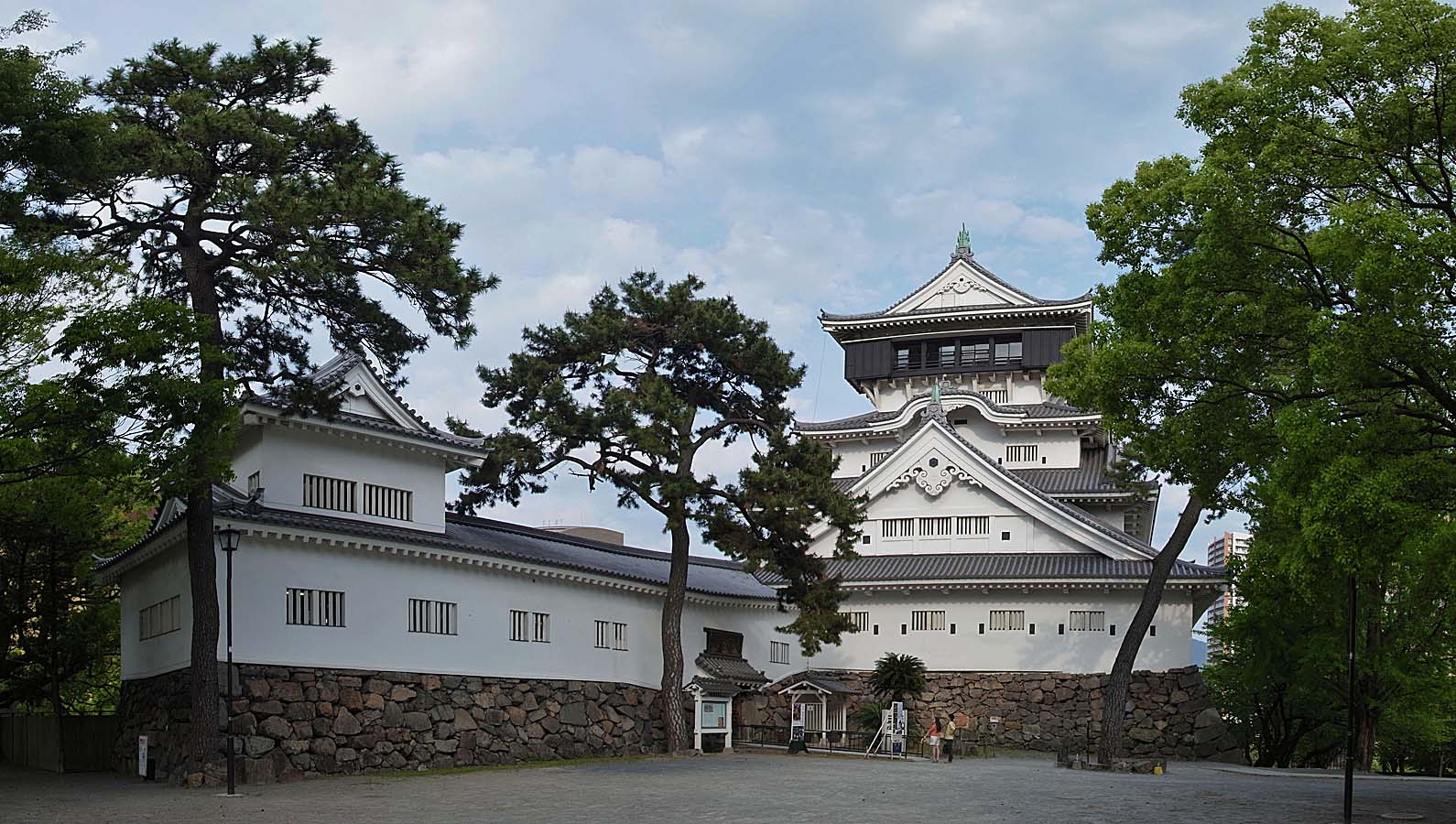
Kokura Castle

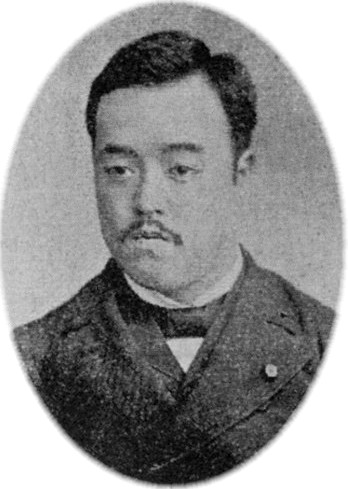
Ogasawara Tadanobu, final daimyō of Kokura Domain
