= Chikujō District, Fukuoka =

District in Fukuoka Prefecture, Japan

Coordinates: 33.586244°N 131.044507°E

Location of Chikujō District in Fukuoka Prefecture

Chikujō (築上郡, Chikujō-gun) is a district located in Fukuoka Prefecture, Japan.

As of 2003, the district has an estimated population of 36,695 and a density of 195.79 persons per square kilometer. The total area is 187.42 km^{2}.

== Towns and villages ==
- Chikujō
- Kōge
- Yoshitomi

== Timeline ==
- 1896 Formed by the merger of both Tsuiki and Kōge Districts.
- On October 11, 2005 the villages of Shin'yoshitomi and Taihei merged to form the new town of Kōge.
- On January 10, 2006 the towns of Shiida and Tsuiki merged to form the new town of Chikujō.
