= Decorated kofun =

Ancient Japanese ornamented tombs

Decorated kofun (装飾古墳, sōshoku kofun) is the term used for kofun or ancient Japanese tombs ornamented with painted or carved decoration. The tombs take the form of tumuli or earthen mounds piled over stone chambers as well as caves excavated from the living rock. The decoration may be on the inner walls, on stone screens, on sarcophagi or, in the case of cave tombs, around the entrance on the exterior. Of the 161,560 ancient burials identified to date, around two hundred and fifty are so decorated. (Note: "Japanese terms: tumuli (墳丘墓, funkyū-bo); cave tombs (横穴墓, yokoana-bo); wall painting (彩色壁画, saishiki hekiga); incised lines (線刻, senkoku); relief carving (浮彫, ukibori); sarcophagus (石棺, sekkan))

== Motifs ==
Decorative motifs include the chokkomon (an X-shape forming triangular zones that intersect irregular curves), circles, concentric circles, triangles, human figures, horses, birds, boats, swords, shields, and quivers. (Note: Japanese terms: chokkomon (直弧文, chokkomon); circles (円文, enmon); concentric circles (同心円文, dōshin-enmon); triangles (三角文, sankaku-mon); boats (船, fune); rings with feet (双脚輪状文, sōkyakurinjō-mon))

== List of decorated kofun ==
This list is of the decorated kofun of ancient Japan, located in Fukuoka prefecture.

Image	Kofun	Municipality	Date	Tomb style	Decoration	Designation	Coordinates	Database
	Urayama Kofun 浦山古墳; Urayama kofun	Kurume	450-500	keyhole	incised (and red) concentric circles, chokkomon, kagitemon, triangles in a continuous pattern	Historic Site	33°17′06″N 130°32′09″E	
	Nichirinji Kofun 日輪寺古墳Nichirinji kofun	Kurume	475-525	keyhole	relief and incised (and red) concentric circles, chokkomon, kagitemon	Historic Site	33°19′14″N 130°29′54″E	
	Yamanoshita Kofun 山ノ下古墳Yamanoshita kofun	Kurume		round	red; indistinct			
	Shimobaba Kofun 下馬場古墳Shimobaba kofun	Kurume	575-600	round	red and blue concentric circles, triangles, and shields	Historic Site	33°18′50″N 130°37′22″E	
	Tōkō-ji Kenzuka Kofun 東光寺剣塚古墳; Tōkō-ji Kenzuka kofun	Fukuoka	525-575	keyhole	incised boats		33°34′26″N 130°25′58″E	
	Sakurakyō Kofun 2 桜京古墳 (２号古墳); Sakurakyō nigō kofun	Munakata	550-600	keyhole	red and green triangles, in a continuous pattern	Historic Site	33°50′38″N 130°29′43″E	
	Haburakan Cave Tomb Cluster 埴生羅漢山横穴墓群; Haburakan yokoana bogun	Nakama	575-650	cave	incised boats		33°48′57″N 130°41′55″E	
	Seto Cave 14 瀬戸14号横穴; Seto jūyongō yokoana	Nakama		cave; replica at the Nakama City Museum of History and Folklore (中間市歴史民俗資料館)	red boats, human figures, horses, and birds		33°49′04″N 130°41′59″E	
	Doinouchi Cave 土居の内横穴; Doinouchi yokoana	Nakama		cave	incised boats		33°49′08″N 130°42′01″E	
	Furutsuki Cave Tomb Cluster (Cave 9) 古月横穴墓群 (９号横穴); Furutsuki yokoana bogun	Kurate	550-650	cave	whitened and incised indistinct grid pattern	Historic Site	33°48′14″N 130°40′09″E	
	Takehara Kofun 竹原古墳; Takehara kofun	Miyawaka	550-600	round	black and red human figure, horse, dragon, fans, boat, waves	Historic Site	33°43′59″N 130°36′38″E	
	Ōzuka Kofun 王塚古墳; Ōzuka kofun	Keisen	525-575	keyhole	red, green, yellow and black circles, concentric circles, triangles, birds, circular patterns with twin feet, vegetal motifs, quivers, bows, swords, shields, riders	Special Historic Site	33°35′19″N 130°39′49″E	
	Togami Kannonzuka Kofun 砥上観音塚古墳; Togami Kannonzuka kofun	Chikuzen	575-600	round	red circles, boats, riders		33°28′52″N 130°36′23″E	
	Kitsunezuka Kofun 狐塚古墳; Kitsunezuka kofun	Asakura	600-625	round	incised circles, concentric circles, boats, horses		33°23′17″N 130°42′46″E	
	Miyajidake Kofun 宮地嶽古墳; Miyajidake kofun	Asakura		round	red and blue circles		33°23′55″N 130°43′42″E	
	Gorōyama Kofun 五郎山古墳; Gorōyama kofun	Chikushino	550-600	round	red, black, and green quivers, bows, boats, houses, horses, birds, human figures, riders	Historic Site	33°27′07″N 130°32′43″E	
	Haginoo Kofun 萩ノ尾古墳; Haginoo kofun	Ōmuta	c.600	round	red and black; concentric circles, triangles, quivers, bows, boats	Historic Site	33°00′11″N 130°28′15″E	

== See also ==
- Kofun period
- Takamatsuzuka kofun
- Kumamoto Prefectural Ancient Burial Mound Museum
