= Nichirinji Kofun =

- 日輪寺古墳 (Japanese)
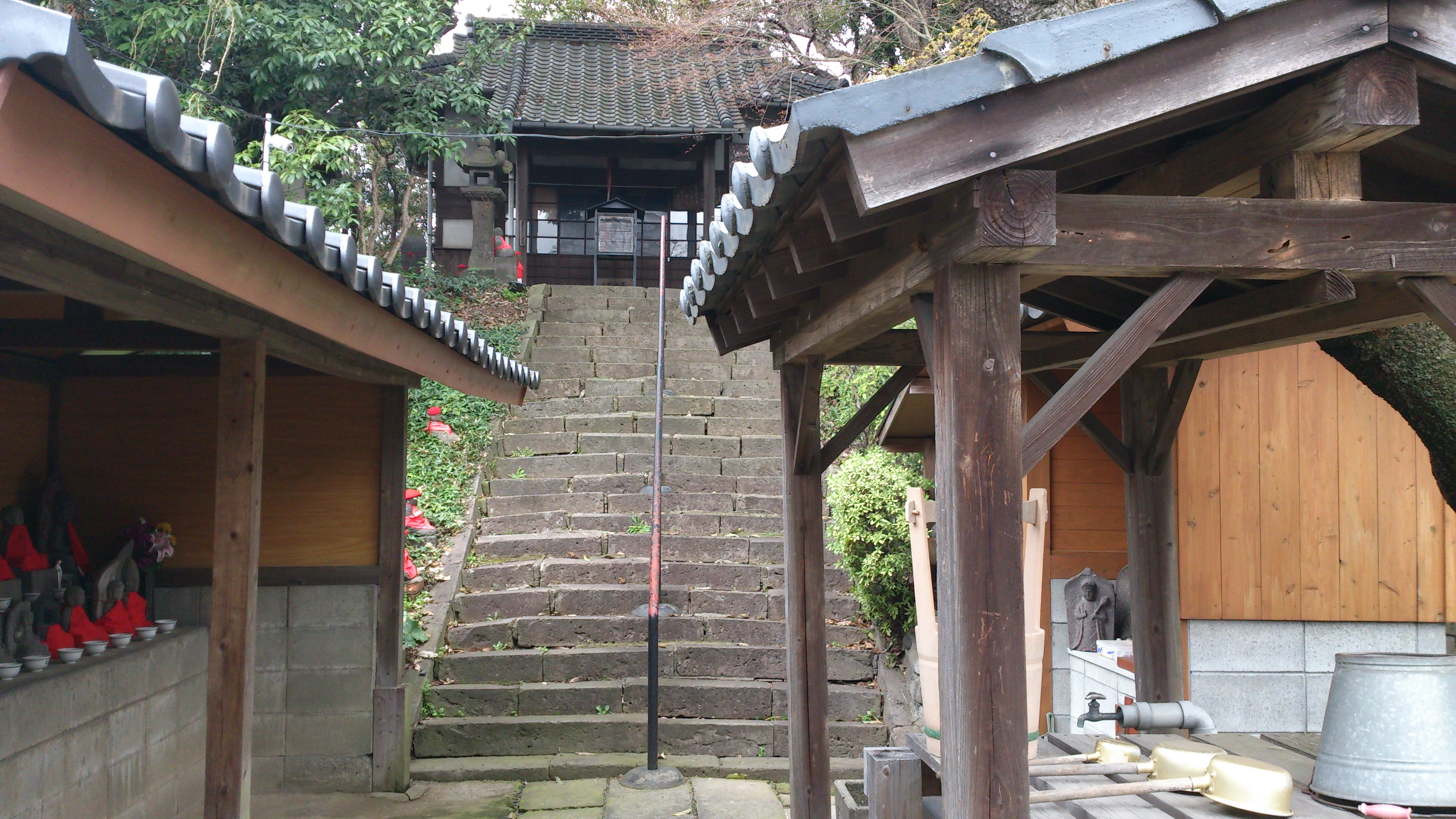
- Nichirinji Kofun

- Nichirinji Kofun Nichirinji Kofun (Japan)
- Interactive map of Nichirinji Kofun
- 33°19′15.3″N 130°29′54.0″E
- Type: Kofun
- Periods: Kofun period
- Location: Kurume, Fukuoka, Japan
- Region: Kyushu

History
- Built: c.5th century

Site notes
- Public access: Yes (no facilities)

The Nichirinji Kofun (日輪寺古墳) is a Kofun period burial mound, located in the Kyōmachi neighborhood of the city of Kurume, Fukuoka Prefecture Japan. The tumulus was designated a National Historic Site of Japan in 1922.

== Overview ==
The Nichirinji Kofun is located on a low plateau formed by the Chikugo River at an elevation of approximately 12 meters. It is a zenpō-kōen-fun (前方後円墳), which is shaped like a keyhole, having one square end and one circular end, when viewed from above. It had a total length of approximately 50 meters; however, when it was discovered by chance in 1912, it was largely destroyed, and now only the 22 meter diameter posterior circular portion and part of the anterior rectangular portion remain. The posterior circular portion contains a horizontal entry stone burial chamber, also severely damaged. The part of the burial chamber that escaped destruction is protected by a covered roof. The burial chamber is nearly rectangular, measuring 3.5 meters in length, 2.3 meters in width, and 1.7 meters in height. The stone used in the burial chamber is andesite, and the stones are piled up flat.

In the burial chamber, there is a stone decorated stone barrier approximately 50 cm in height made of tuff from Mount Aso, and it is inscribed with line carvings in concentric circles, straight arcs, and key marks. In addition to the stone barrier, the back wall and the upper halves of both left and right walls are decorated with a line-engraved pattern of alternating keystrokes and concentric circles. Some faint traces of red pigment remains in the line engravings, and the pattern is said to date from the early 6th century. Similar examples of the stone barrier motif can be found in a number of other kofun in the Chikuzen and Chikugo regions, such as the Urayama Kofun.

At the time of its archaeological excavation in 1912 by Kyoto Imperial University, grave goods included four Chinese-style four-beast bronze mirror, two copper earrings, an iron sword, iron arrowheads, two magatama beads and eight tubular beads, shards of Haji ware and Sue ware pottery, and a sandstone stone pillow. These excavated artifacts date from the late 5th century to early 6th century, and are in the possession of Nichirin-ji temple, with the exception of the stone pillow, which is in the possession of the Tokyo National Museum.

The kofun is located on the grounds of the Rinzai school temple of Nichirin-ji, from which it gets its name. It is approximately five minutes on foot west from Kurume Station on the Kyushu Shinkansen.

== See also ==
- List of Historic Sites of Japan (Fukuoka)
- Decorated kofun
