= Tsukuriyama Kofun =

Tsukuriyama Kofun may refer to:

- Tsukuriyama Kofun (Yosano)
- Tsukuriyama Kofun (Okayama)
- Tsukuriyama Kofun (Sōja)
