= Shimobaba Kofun =

Burial mound in Kurume, Japan

- 馬場古墳 (Japanese)
- Shimobaba Kofun Shimobaba Kofun (Japan)
- Interactive map of Shimobaba Kofun
- 33°18′50″N 130°37′22″E
- Type: Kofun
- Periods: Kofun period
- Location: Kurume, Fukuoka, Japan
- Region: Kyushu

History
- Built: c.6th century

Site notes
- Public access: Yes (occasionally)

The Shimobaba Kofun (下馬場古墳) is a Kofun period burial mound, located in the Kusano neighborhood of the city of Kurume, Fukuoka Prefecture Japan. The tumulus was designated a National Historic Site of Japan in 1944. Together with the Yakushi Shimokita Kofun and the Yakushi Shimominami Kofun, which no longer exist, it was part of the Yoshiki Kofun Cluster.

== Overview ==
The Shimobaba Kofun is located on a gentle alluvial fan at the northern foot of the Minou Mountains, which limits the southern part of the Chikugo Plain. It is a enpun (円墳) circular tumulus with a diameter of approximately 30 meters and a height of approximately fve meters, with a horizontal entry stone burial chamber orientated to the west. It has a length of 12 meters and is divided into a corridor and a front and rear chamber. It is thought to have been constructed in the latter half of the 6th century. The tomb has been robbed in antiquity, and there are no surviving grave goods; however, but a cylindrical haniwa was found at the base of the burial mound, and a female figurine clay figurine with a sash was discovered in the outer area during an archaeological excavation conducted in 2012. The excavation also confirmed that the tumulus was originally 42 meters in diameter and had been surrounded by a five-meter wide moat. The tumulus is a decorated kofun, and decorations are painted on almost the entire wall of the burial chamber, although they are faded and unclear. The decorations are mainly red-colored concentric circles, with continuous triangular patterns and ship-like shapes. It appears that some blue colors were also used.

The tumulus is a 15-minute walk from Chikugo-Kusano Station on the JR Kyushu Kyūdai Main Line. It was formerly open to the public, but is now only open on a couple of days a year for preservation.

== See also ==
- List of Historic Sites of Japan (Fukuoka)
- Decorated kofun
