= Urayama Kofun =

- 浦山古墳 (Japanese)
- Urayama Kofun Urayama Kofun (Japan)
- Interactive map of Urayama Kofun
- 33°17′06″N 130°32′09″E
- Type: Kofun
- Periods: Kofun period
- Location: Kurume, Fukuoka, Japan
- Region: Kyushu

History
- Built: c.5th century

Site notes
- Public access: Yes

The Urayama Kofun (浦山古墳) is a Kofun period burial mound, located in the Kamizu neighborhood of the city of Kurume, Fukuoka Prefecture Japan. The tumulus was designated a National Historic Site of Japan in 1951.

== Overview ==
The Urayama Kofun is located on a small hill commonly called Mount Chabozu, which is derived from Mt. Myojo and Mt. Tobidake at the western end of the Minou Mountains that limit the southern part of the Chikugo Plain. This scallop-shaped kofun (帆立型古墳, hotate-gata kofun) is 60 meters long and was constructed in part by carving out a portion of the natural hill. Inside the posterior circular portion is a horizontal entry-style stone burial chamber orientated to the northwest. It contains large house-shaped sarcophagus made of tuff. The lid is in the shape of a four-pillar roof, with two ring-shaped hanging protrusions on each side, and the body consists of four walls and a bottom made of one stone each. Decorative patterns are engraved on the inside of the sarcophagus, and the upper and lower tiers of the side and back walls of the burial chamber are decorated with straight arc pattern belts, with the middle tier decorated with double circle pattern belts. Traces of vermilion paint still remain in some parts. Simple straight-arch patterns are also inscribed on the inside and outside surfaces of the front wall. Grave goods include magatama beads, gold rings, iron swords, and armor. From these artifacts, it is believed that the tomb is slightly older than the similarly decorated Nichirinji Kofun and was built in the latter half of the 5th century.

The burial chamber is now protected by a covered roof, permitting visits to see the sarcophagus and a portion of the wall engravings. The tumulus is located within the grounds of the Naritasan Kurume Bunin temple, approximately 6.1 kilometers southeast of Kurume Station or 5.3 kilometers east of Araki Station on the JR Kyushu Kagoshima Main Line.

== See also ==
- List of Historic Sites of Japan (Fukuoka)
- Decorated kofun
