= Gorōyama kofun =

Gorōyama Kofun
- 五郎山古墳 (Japanese)
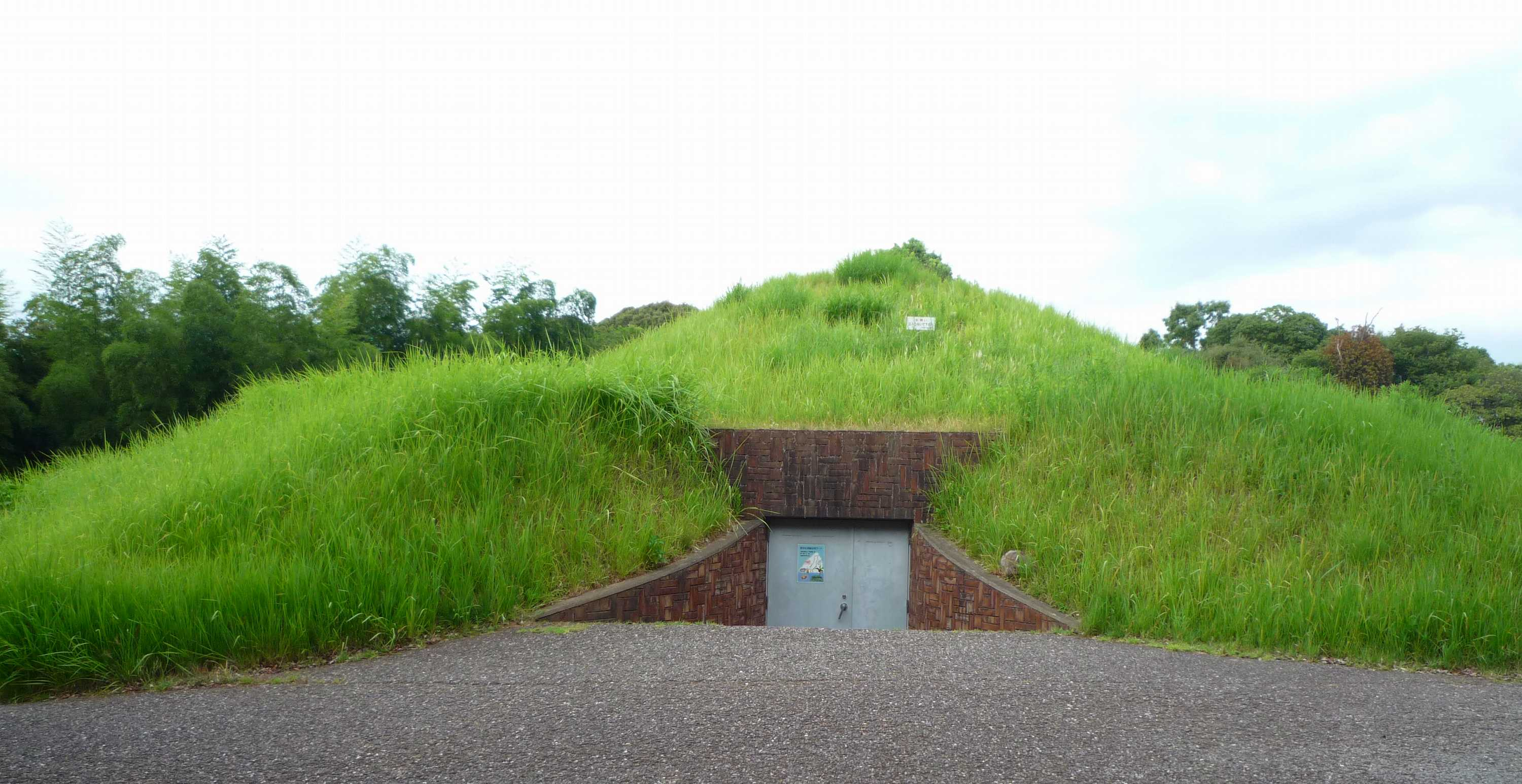
- Gorōyama Kofun

- Gorōyama Kofun Gorōyama kofun (Japan)
- 33°27′07″N 130°32′43″E
- Type: Kofun
- Periods: Kofun period
- Location: Chikushino, Fukuoka, Japan
- Region: Kyushu

History
- Built: c.6th century

Site notes
- Public access: Yes (museum)
- National Historic Site of Japan

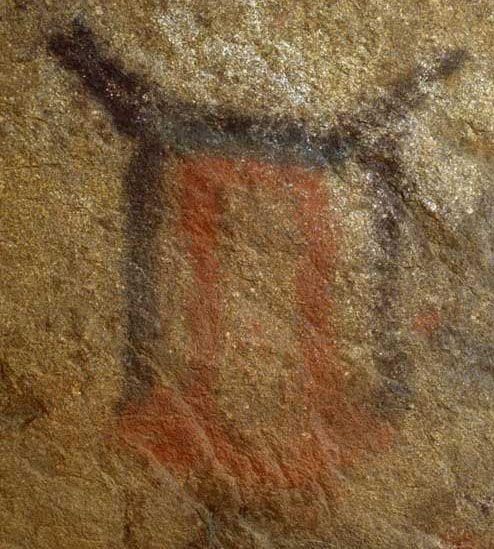
Detail from the rear wall of the Gorōyama kofun (c. 550-600); building with a painted red door and flared gables

The Gorōyama Kofun (五郎山古墳) is a Kofun period Decorated kofun burial mound, located in the Harada neighborhood of the town of Chikushino, Fukuoka Prefecture, Japan. The tumulus was designated a National Historic Site of Japan in 1949, with the area under protection adjusted in 1984. It is one of the largest circular tombs in Chikushino, dating from the late Kofun period (6th century).

== Overview ==
The Sendō Kofun is located on a hill called Mount Gorō, and is an enpun (円墳)-style circular tumulus approximately 35 meters in diameter and 6 meters in height. It was discovered by chance in 1947 and in 1948 and a mural was discovered inside the horizontal-pit type stone burial chamber. The burial chamber with a total length of 11.2 meters, and is a multi-chamber structure unique to northern Kyushu, consisting of a passage, anterior chamber, and posterior chamber. The murals are painted along the passageway from the anterior chamber to the posterior chamber, and throughout the posterior chamber. The designs are painted in red, black, and green and depict people, ships, cavalry, houses, horses, snowflakes, animals, and concentric circles, but many have faded and is now difficult to decipher. Due to grave robbing, very few grave goods remained, but gold rings, pipe beads, magatama beads, swords, and Sue ware have been collected. The tomb is dated to c. 550-600.

The site is approximately a ten-minute walk from Harada Station on the JR Kyushu Kagoshima Main Line. There is a museum on site The Gorōyama Kofun Museum (五郎山古墳館, Gorōyama kofunkan) exhibits replicas of the paintings and has an observation room with a view into the mound.

== See also ==
- List of Historic Sites of Japan (Fukuoka)
- Decorated kofun
