= Haginoo Kofun =

- 萩ノ尾古墳 (Japanese)
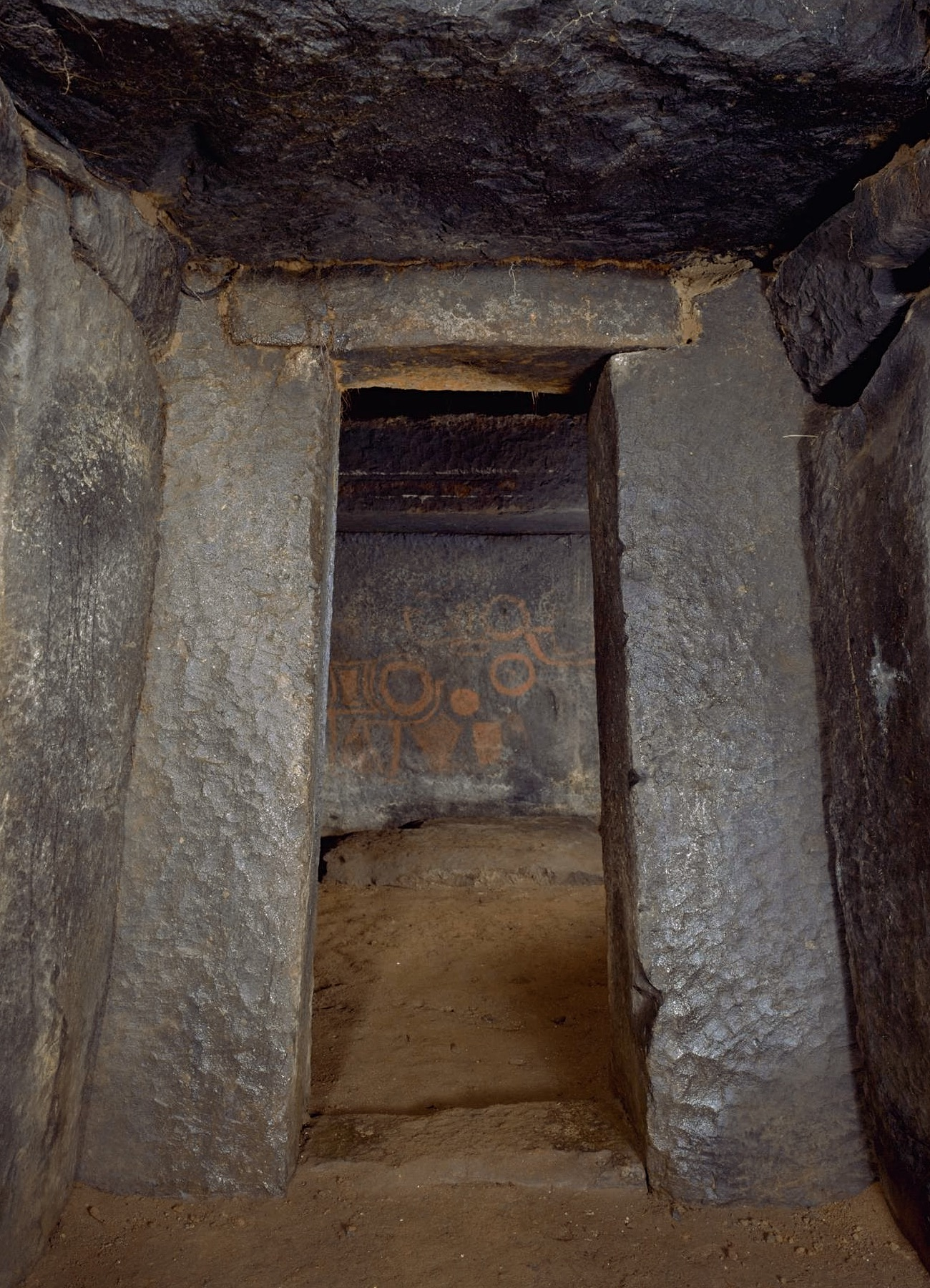
- Haginoo Kofun interior

- Haginoo Kofun Haginoo Kofun (Japan)
- 33°00′11″N 130°28′15″E
- Type: Kofun
- Periods: Kofun period
- Location: Ōmuta, Fukuoka, Japan
- Region: Kyushu

History
- Built: c.6th century

Site notes
- Elevation: 41 m (135 ft)
- Public access: Yes (no facilities)
- National Historic Site of Japan

The Haginoo Kofun (萩ノ尾古墳) is a Kofun period burial mound, located in the Higashihagio neighborhood of the city of Ōmuta, Fukuoka Prefecture Japan. The tumulus was designated a National Historic Site of Japan in 1961. It is the only survivor of what was once known as the Shobara Kofun Cluster.

== Overview ==
The Haginoo Kofun is located at the western end of the Shobara Plateau, which extends to the west of Mount Yakeishi in the southern part of the city of Ōmuta, and is approximately 41 meters above sea level. To the south, the Suwa River, which forms the prefectural border between Fukuoka and Kumamoto, flows westward, and tuff, which is a pyroclastic flow deposit from Mount Aso, is widely distributed throughout the area, and tuff is also used for the stone materials of this tumulus.

It is an enpun (円墳)-style circular tumulus, with a diameter of 21 meters and a height of about five meters, with a side cave-style horizontal entry stone burial chamber facing west. According to an archaeological excavation conducted in 2000, it was built around the end of the 6th century, based on excavated earthenware. The chamber is divided into a vestibule and the burial chamber proper, and the burial chamber consists of an anterior chamber and a posterior chamber. Each chamber was constructed by placing huge cut monoliths of tuff as foundations at the bottom of the walls and stacking split stones at the top, and the ceilings are quite high. The posterior chamber has a floor width of approximately 2.67 meters, a length of approximately 2.9 meters, and a height of approximately 3 meters. There is a stone shelf on the back wall, and the wall below it has designs in red pigment. The designs can be broadly divided into two groups, and the group on the upper right shows two gondola-shaped boats and a circular pattern with a dot in the center lined up one above the other. There is also an ellipse below the ship on the left. The group on the lower left has decorations that look like shields or bows, but the basic motifs are geometric patterns based on circular and triangular patterns. Documents indicate that there used to be decorations on the right wall of the burial chamber, but this cannot be confirmed today. The burial chamber has been opened for centuries, and an inscription dated 1692 was found carved into one of the stones.

The front room is smaller, with a floor width of approximately 1.66 meters, length of approximately 1.84 meters, and height of approximately 2.66 meters.

This tumulus is notable for its burial chamber structure, and that it is a decorated kofun with paintings in a single color on the walls. It is located adjacent to the Ariake National College of Technology, or 4.6 kilometers southeast of Ōmuta Station on the JR Kyushu Kagoshima Main Line.

== See also ==
- List of Historic Sites of Japan (Fukuoka)
- Decorated kofun
