= Tsukuriyama Kofun (Okayama) =

Burial mound cluster

- 造山古墳 (Japanese)
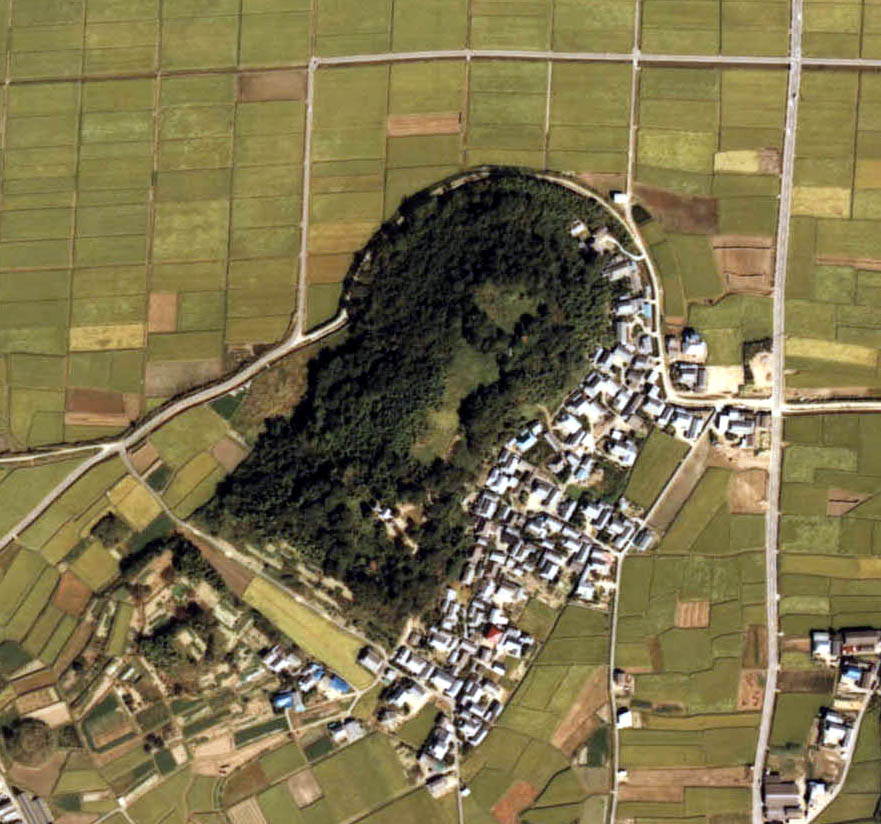
- Tsukuriyama Kofun

- Tsukuriyama Kofun Tsukuriyama Kofun (Okayama) (Japan)
- Interactive map of Tsukuriyama Kofun
- 34°40′25.63″N 133°48′13.35″E
- Type: Kofun
- Periods: Kofun period
- Location: Kita-ku, Okayama, Okayama Prefecture, Japan
- Region: San'yō region

History
- Built: early 5th century

Site notes
- Public access: Yes (museum)

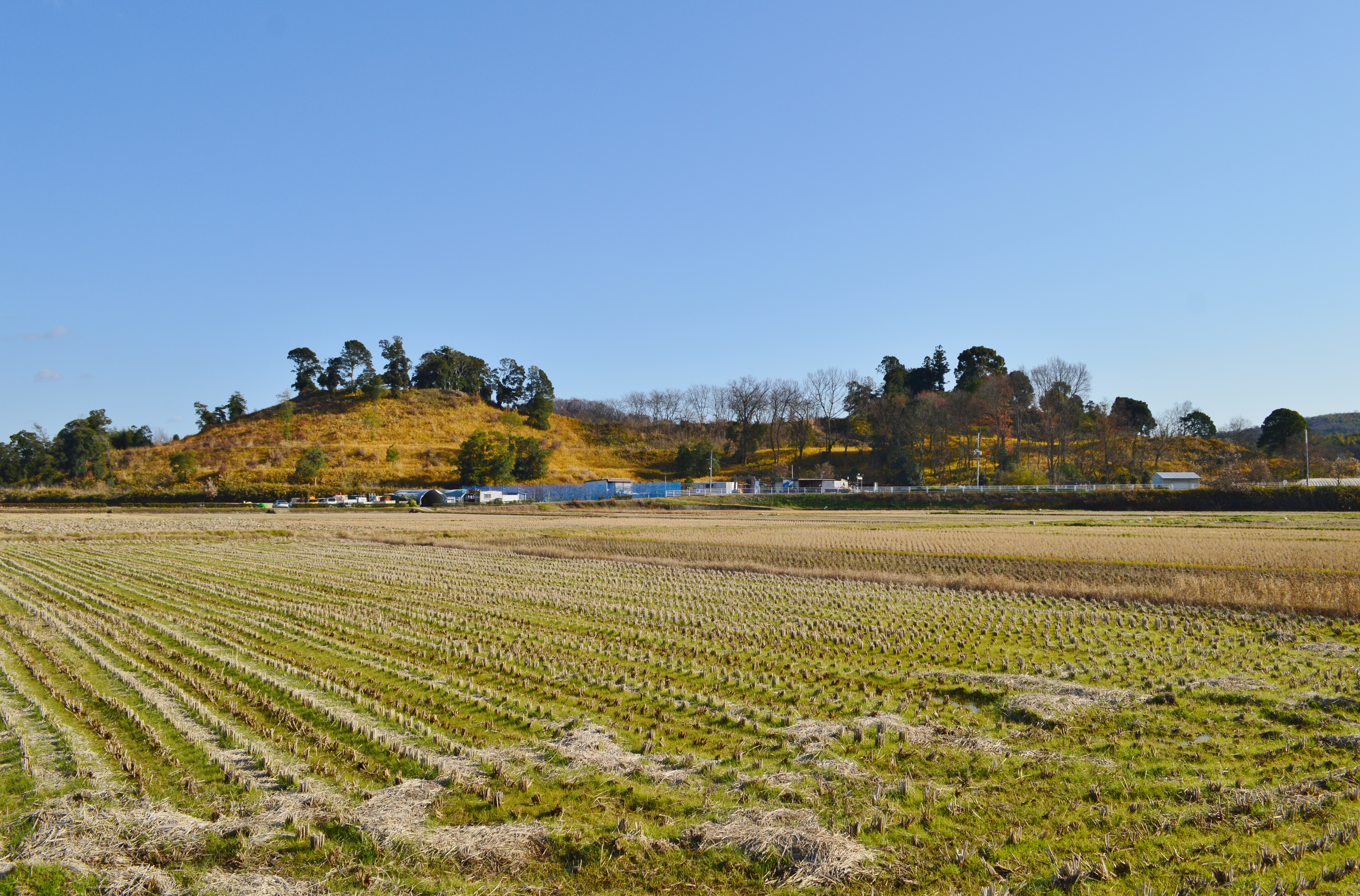
Panoramic View

Tsukuriyama Kofun (造山古墳) is a cluster of Kofun period burial mounds located in the Shinjōshita neighborhood of Kita-ku, Okayama, Okayama Prefecture, in the San'yō region of Japan. The cluster was designated a National Historic Site of Japan in 1921. The main Tsukuriyama Kofun is the largest burial mound in Okayama Prefecture and the fourth largest in Japan.

== Overview ==
The Tsukuriyama Kofun is a zenpō-kōen-fun (前方後円墳), which is shaped like a keyhole, having one square end and one circular end, when viewed from above. The tumulus was built by cutting a hill on the right bank of the Ashimori River in the western part of Okayama city. The tumulus consists of three tiers, and each tier was lined with cylindrical haniwa and covered with fukiishi. It has a length of approximately 350 meters, and is estimated to have been built in the first half of the 5th century. A characteristic of this burial mound is that the ratio of the posterior circular portion to the length of the mound is large. The anterior portion is thought to have been modified in the Sengoku period, when a Shinto shrine was constructed, and a hamlet exists on the southeastern end of the mound. The chozubachi placed next the shrine is the body part of a hollowed-out sarcophagus made of tuff, and fragments of the lid of the sarcophagus are scattered on the right side of the shrine. This sarcophagus is presumed to have been robbed from one of the tumuli in this area at some unknown date. From the size of the tumulus, it is believed to be the tomb of the 5th century kings of the Kingdom of Kibi. The posterior portion was also flattened and was used as a fortification and lookout point during Toyotomi Hideyoshi's invasion of western Japan.

Although it is the largest tumulus not under the control of the Imperial Household Agency, full-scale academic research has not been conducted to date, and the interior has not yet been excavated, so details of the burial chamber and grave goods are unknown. From 2009 to 2012, a research team from Okayama University conducted an excavation outside of the designated historic site for the purpose of identifying the scale at the time of construction, the existence of a surrounding moat, and for confirmation of relics that can be used to estimate the construction period. As a result, the existence of a surrounding 20-meter wide moat was confirmed on the east side of the posterior circular portion, and a large number of haniwa fragments from various shapes of haniwa was recovered. In 2016, a portion of the tumulus slope collapsed due to heavy rain.

There are six smaller kofun in the surrounding area, which are regarded to being baizuka, or ancillary tombs, for the main Tsukuriyama Kofun. The Senzoku Kofun (Tsukuriyama No. 5 Kofun) is a rare decorated kofun, with paintings of magical symbols on the stone walls of the horizontal stone burial chamber. This keyhole-shaped tumulus has a total length of 75 meters. It was robbed in antiquity, and a stone sarcophagus remains in its anterior portion. In October 2009, the paintings were found to be detecting from the walls due to water damage, and the growth of mold was found to be problem in May 2010, leading to academic researchers detaching the murals for preservation.

The Tsukuriyama Kofun Visitor Center (造山古墳ビジターセンター) was opened in April 2020.

=== Details ===
Overall length
350–360 meters
Posterior circular portion
190 meter diameter x 29 meter high, 3-tier
Anterior rectangular portion
215 meters wide x 25 meters high, 3-tier

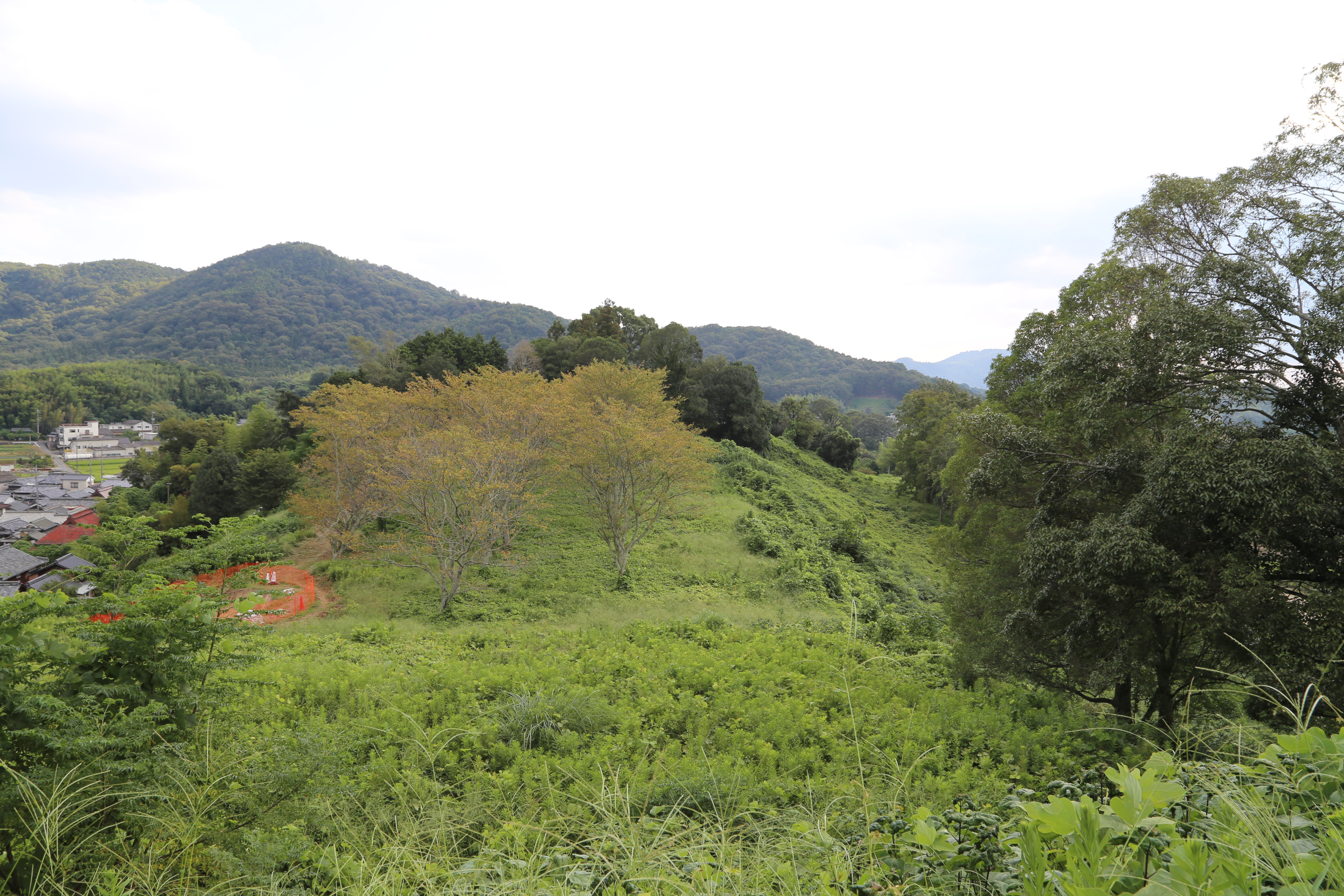
Looking forward from the rear circular part

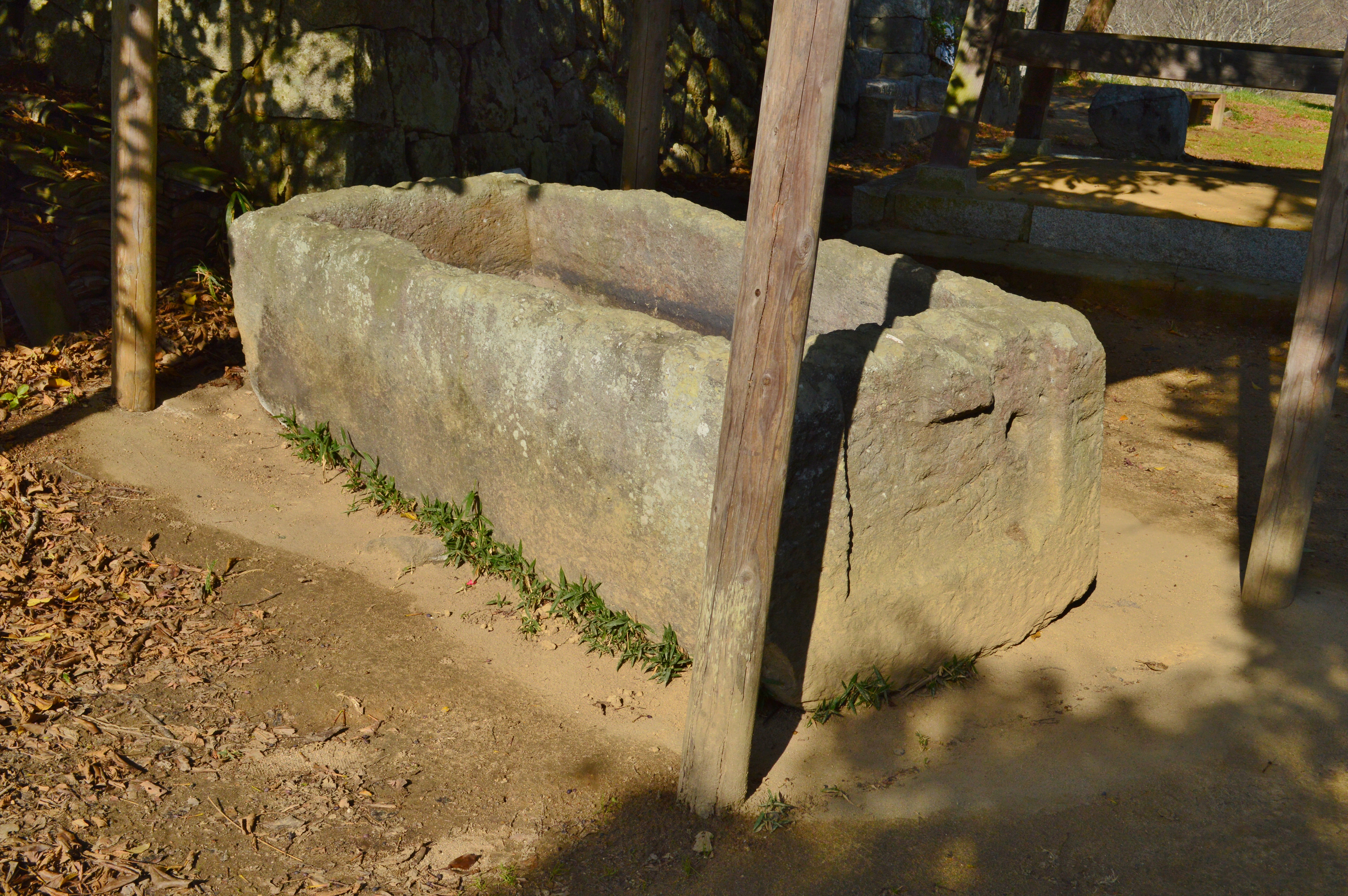
Stone sarcophagus

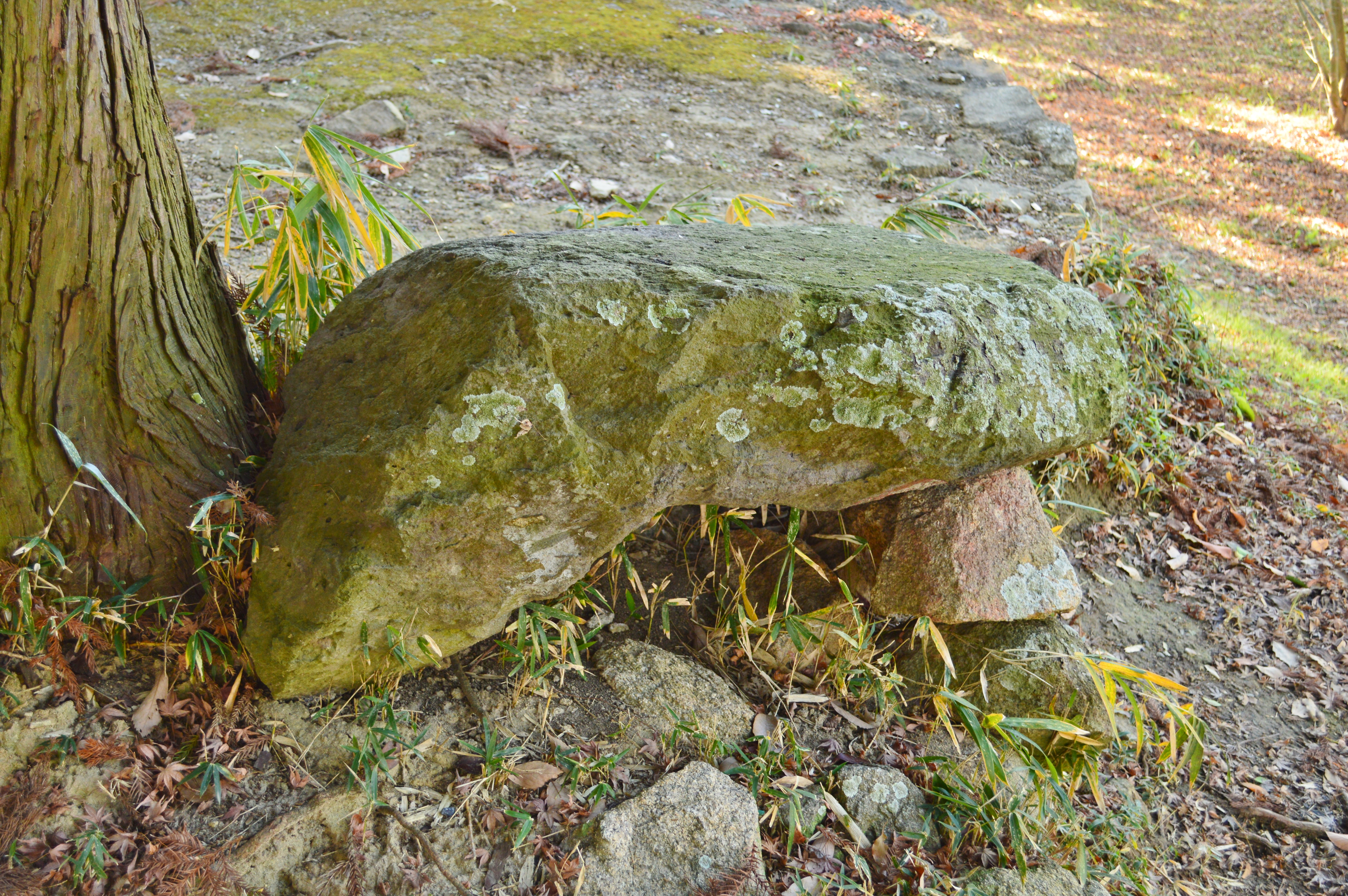
Fragments of stone sarcophagus

=== Baizuka ===
Sakakiyama Kofun (Tsukuriyama No. 1)	empun (円墳) circuler mound or zenpō-kōen-fun (前方後円墳)	Rear circle diameter about 40m	A horse-shaped belt hook was excavated. In addition, a divine beast mirror and copper bells were excavated.
Tsukuriyama No. 2	hōfun (方墳) square mound	About 40 meters on a side	Surrounding moat exists. More than 100 haniwa were unearthed in a row on the outer bank.
Tsukuriyama No. 3	empun (円墳) (uncertain)	Diameter about 30 meters	
Tsukuriyama No. 4	empun (円墳) circular mound or zenpō-kōen-fun (前方後円墳)	Length 55 meters	Cylindrical and figurative haniwa (house-shaped and armor-shaped) excavated from the edge of the mound.
Senzoku Kofun (Tsukuriyama No. 5)	hotategata kofun (帆立貝形古墳) scallop-shaped kofun	Length 75 meters	Construction of 3 stages. It has an early horizontal stone chamber similar to the ornamental burial mounds in the northwestern part of Kyushu. In the stone chamber, there is a stone partition carved with a straight arc pattern.
Tsukuriyama No. 6	empun (円墳) circular mound	Diameter 30 meters	It has a horizontal stone chamber.

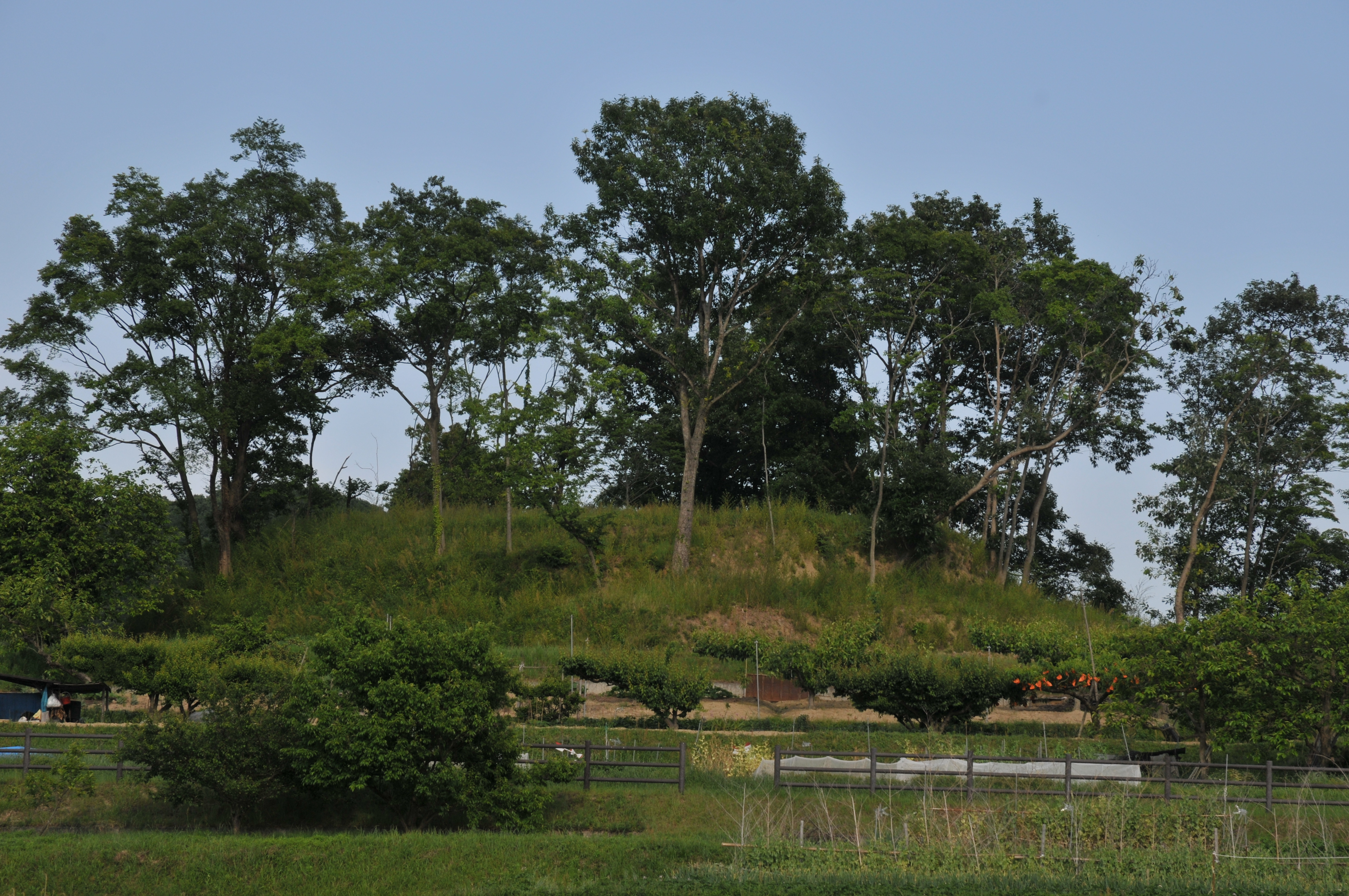
Sakakiyama Kofun (Tsukuriyama No.1)

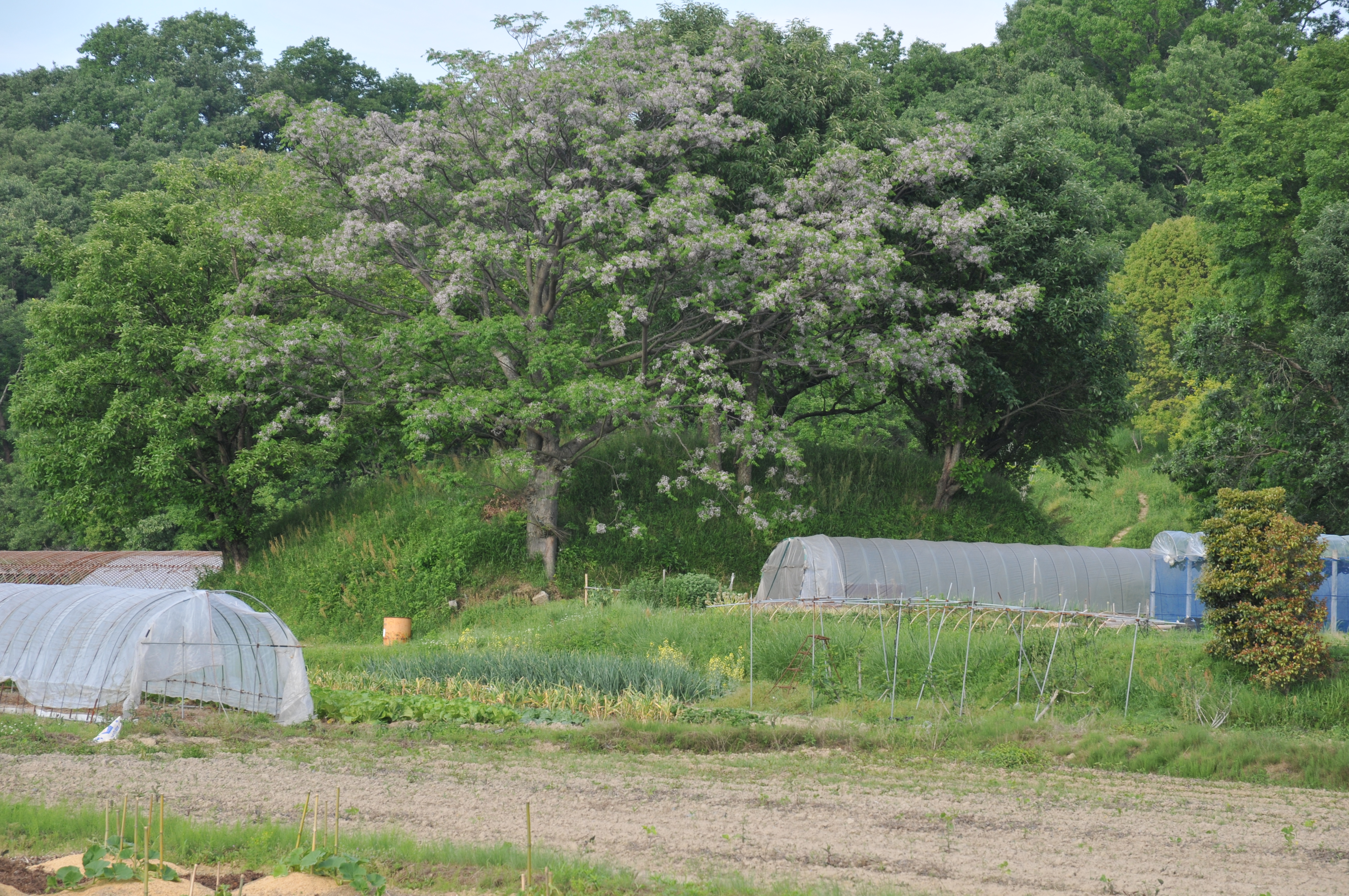
Tsukuriyama No.2

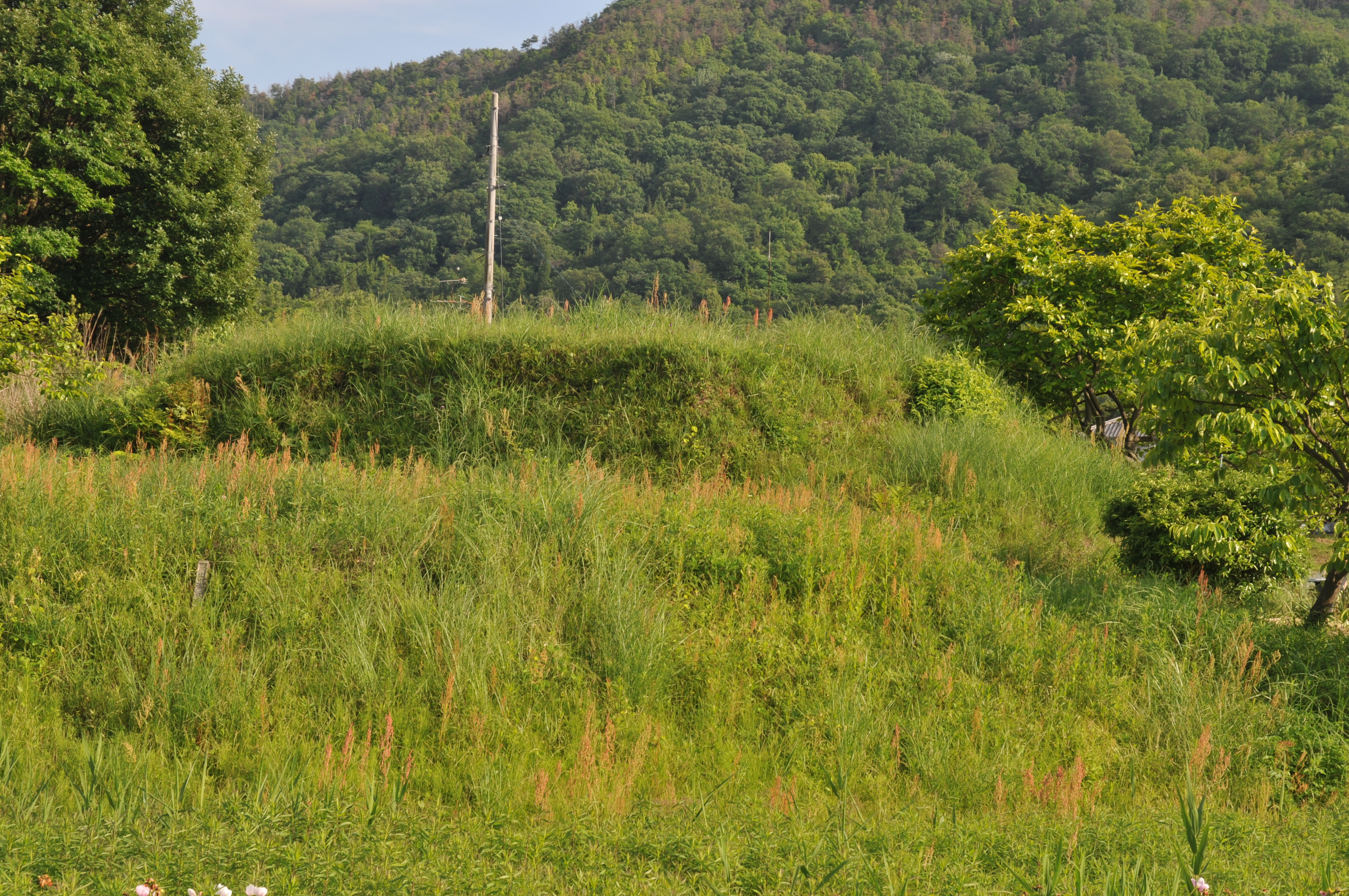
Tsukuriyama No.3

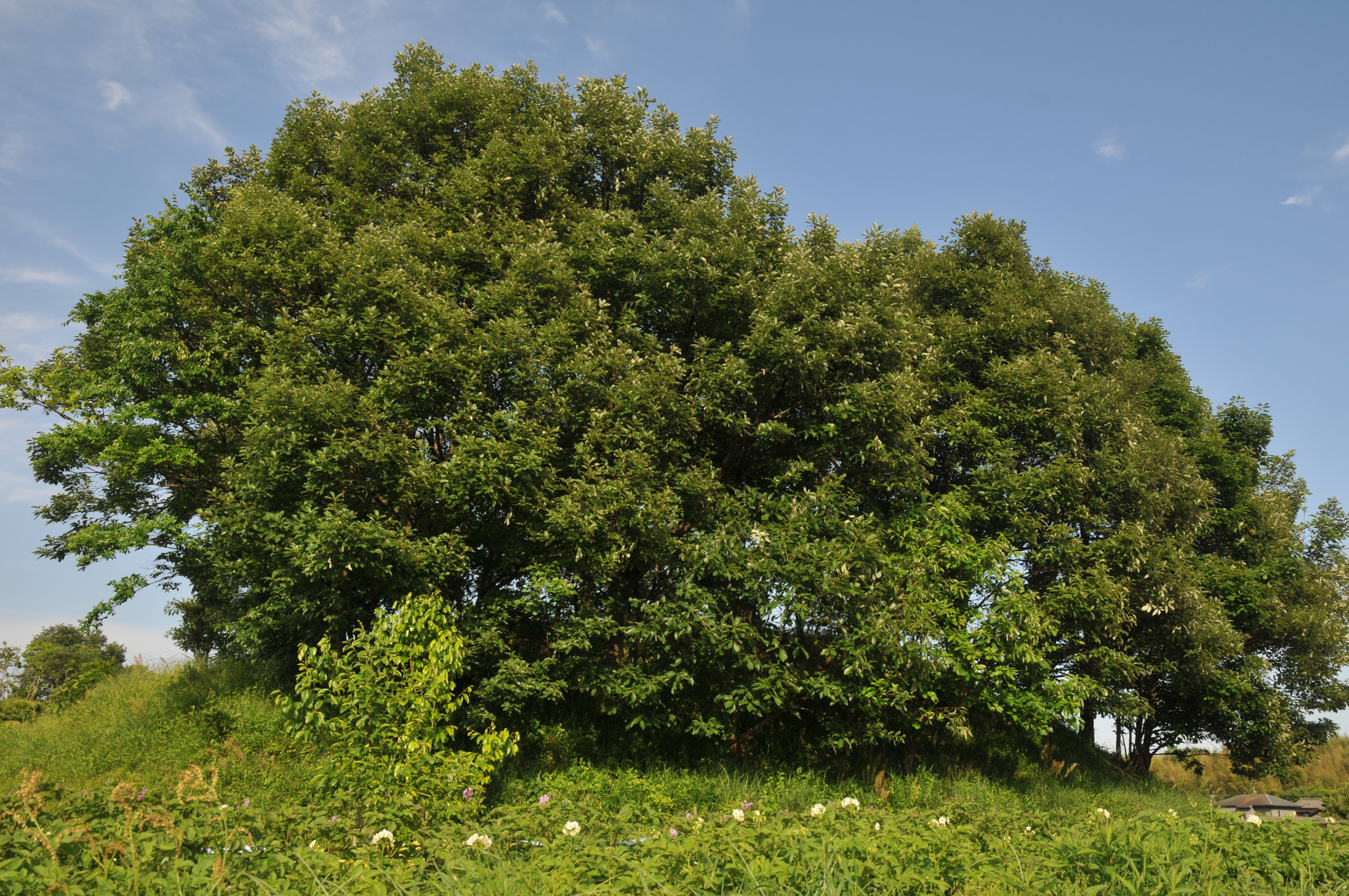
Tsukuriyama No.4

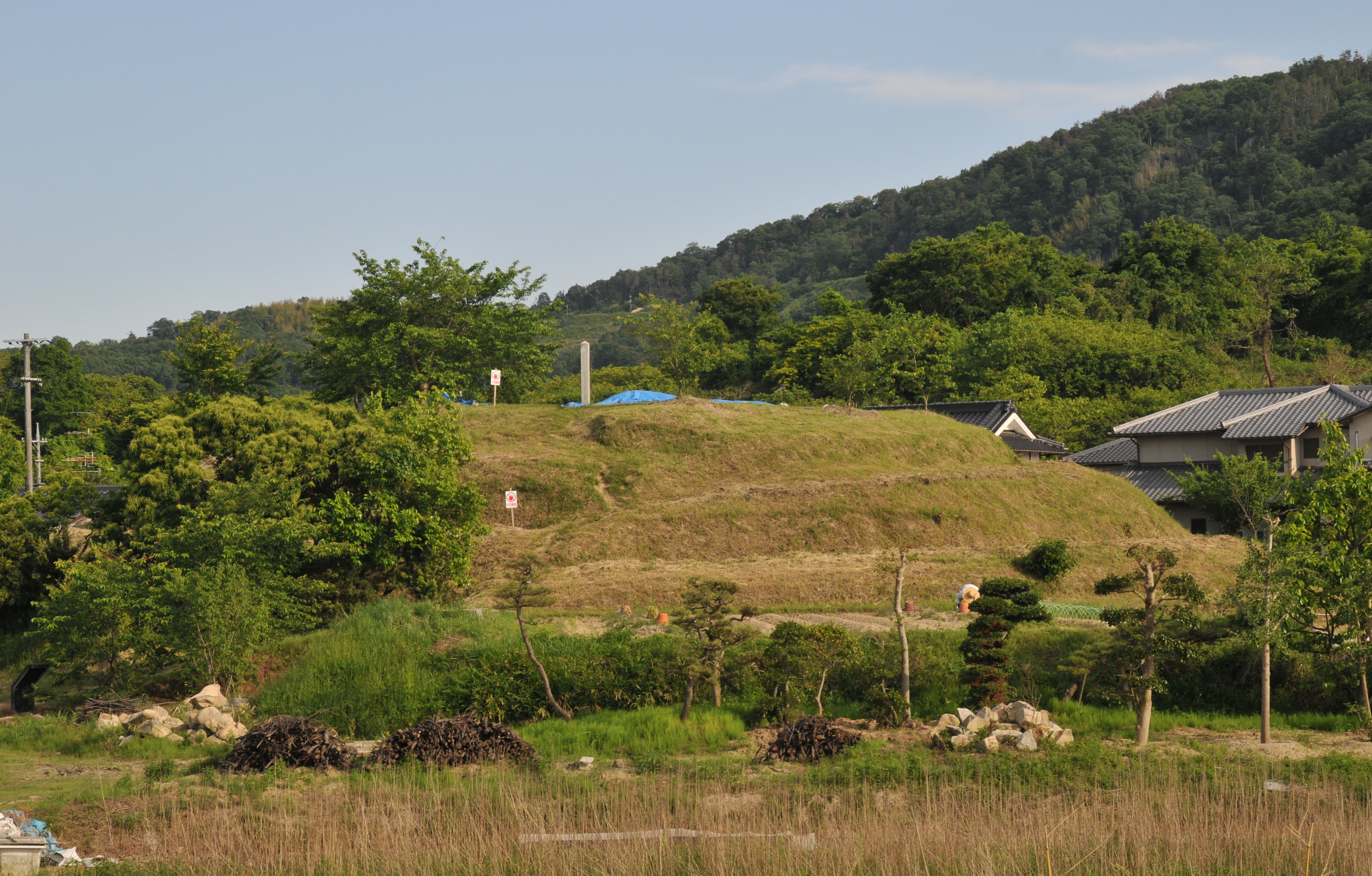
Senzoku Kofun (Tsukuriyama No.5)

== See also ==
- List of Historic Sites of Japan (Okayama)
