= Zenpōkōenfun =

Style of Ancient Japanese tomb resembling a keyhole

Zenpokoefun

Zenpokoenfun is an architectural model of Japanese ancient tombs (Kofun), which consists of a square front part (前方部, Zenpō-bu) and a circular back part (後円部, Kōen-bu). The part connecting the two is called the middle part (くびれ部, Kubire-bu), which looks like a keyhole when viewed from above. Therefore, they are also called keyhole-shaped mounds in English, and in Korean, they are called long drum tombs (장고분, Janggobun) due to their resemblance to Janggu, and it is also a form of the Kofun that appeared earlier in the Kofun period along with the enpun (円墳; lit. circular type). Generally, large Kofun are front and rear circular tombs, widely distributed in Honshu, Shikoku, and Kyushu with Gokishichidō as the center. Among them, the largest front and rear circular tomb in Japan are the Mozu Tombs with a total length of 525 meters. In addition to Japan, there are also the front and rear circular tombs in South Korea, as well as the front and rear circular tombs in Chosan County Ancient Tomb Group and Chasong County Ancient Tomb Group located in North Korea. In addition, Korean archaeologist Jiang Renqiu believes that the Songhe Dong No. 1 Tomb (Wuyishan Mountain Kofun) located in Goseong County, South Gyeongsang Ancient Tomb Group, is the Zenpokoenfun.

== Etymology ==
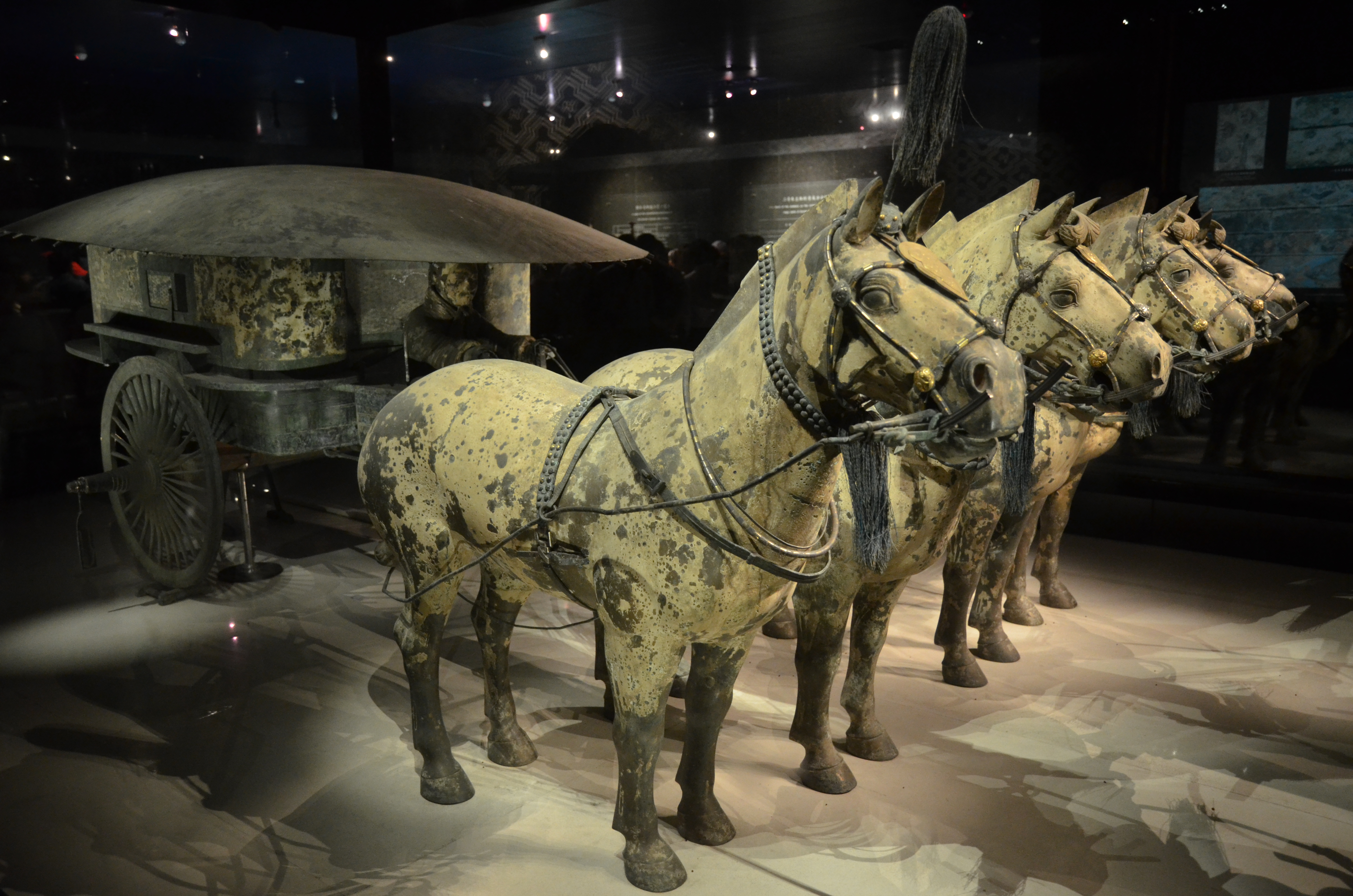
Qin bronze chariot #2

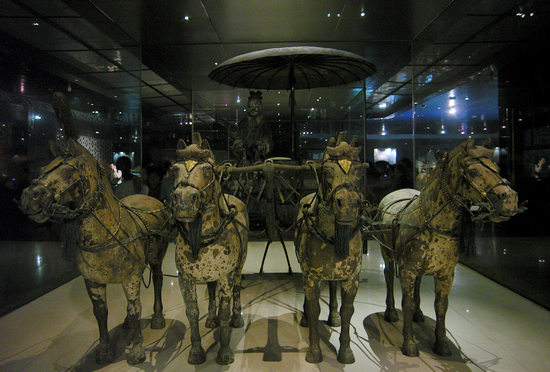
Qin bronze chariot #1

Collection of the Qin Shi Huang Terracotta Warriors and Horses Museum (China, Shaanxi Province, Xi'an City, Lintong District)

At first, Zenpokoenfun did not have a specific name, but were named after objects that were around the people during that era. Therefore, they were also known as Chezun, Yaozi, Chajiu, Calabash, Piaozhong, and Erzi Tombs. Chezun refers to the front and back circular parts of Kofun, which are named after cars. Yaozi Tomb is named after the fact that when viewed from the side, it looks like half of the lying Yaozi, Chajiu Tomb is named after the two or three layers of the back circle that look like a teacup and is also known as the teacup tomb and the cup-shaped tomb. The cup-shaped tomb, refers to the shape of the front and back circular tombs, which is like half of a gourd buried in the soil. Erzi Tomb, also known as the Erzi Tomb and Gemini Tomb, refers to the front and back circular tombs with similar heights between the front and back parts. Most of the front and rear circular tombs referred to as this are concentrated in the Kantō region.

The term "Zenpokoenfun" can be found in the "Annals of the Mountains" written by Pusheng Junping in the 5th year of the Bunka (1808), which recorded: "Just like a palace carriage, the front and rear circular tombs are three stories high and surrounded by Moat" (必象宮車。而使前方後圓。為壇三成。且環以溝。). Zenpokoenfun are considered as palace carriages, and the rear circular parts are compared to car covers, (Note: Palace carriage refers to the vehicle used by the emperor and the royal family.) while the front part is a shaft. (Note: Car cover refers to the umbrella cover on the car.) In addition, Toshihara Yoichi, the director researcher of the Nara Prefectural Tsuwara Archaeology Institute, (Note: Yuan refers to two straight logs used to drive livestock in front of the car, one on the left and one on the right.) believes that the circular part is the part where the bullock cart, and the front part is the part where the ox cart pulls. Yoichi Tsuwara, the director of the Tsuwara Burial Cultural Center in Nara Prefectural, sees the palace cart as a bronze chariot or a hearse. Starting from the late Meiji era, Zenpokoenfun continued to be used as an academic term.

== Origin ==
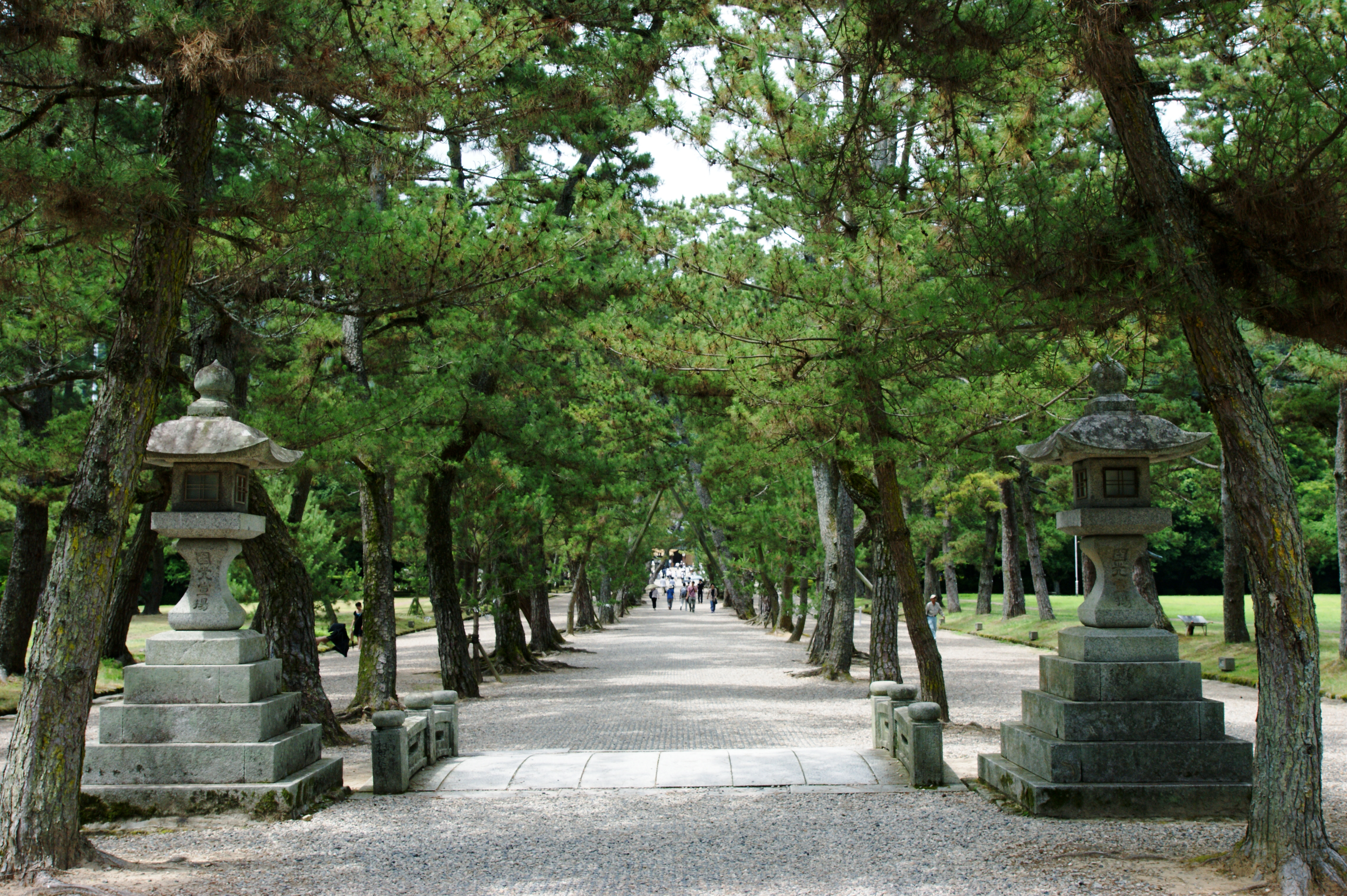
Candao of Yunda Society

There are multiple theories regarding the origin of Zenpokoenfun. (Note: I think it's hard to imagine using palace chariots at the time, so this statement is not credible.) Firstly, the term "imitation of objects" was used. In addition to the "palace chariot" term, which was no longer adopted during the Meiji era, Masahiko Shimada and Daiichi Harada believed that they had imitated the wide-mouthed earthenware pot, with the back circular part being the pot and the front part being the wide spout. In addition, there is Hamada Farming who proposed the shield theory. Both were criticized by Sen Haoyi, who believed that the wide-mouthed earthenware had a far different shape from the early Zenpokoenfun. In fact, the shield unearthed from the early Kofun had a weak circular arc above it and a straight line below it, which was also different from the shape of the front and back circular tombs. Moreover, since the shield was flat, it could not explain the reason for the arch of the back circular part. Hamada later withdrew this statement on his own. In addition, the original Koushu people also proposed the idea of imitating the family house, believing that the tomb as the post-death residence was a common concept in different cultures, and compared the Xuan room to the main part, reproducing the appearance of the pre-life residence through envy and vice rooms. Maomu Yabo thinks that is inappropriate to suggest that Zenpokoenfun was based on the imitation of objects, and Tsumatsu Mingjiu also believes that there are many similar objects to Zenpokoenfun, which is just a theory.

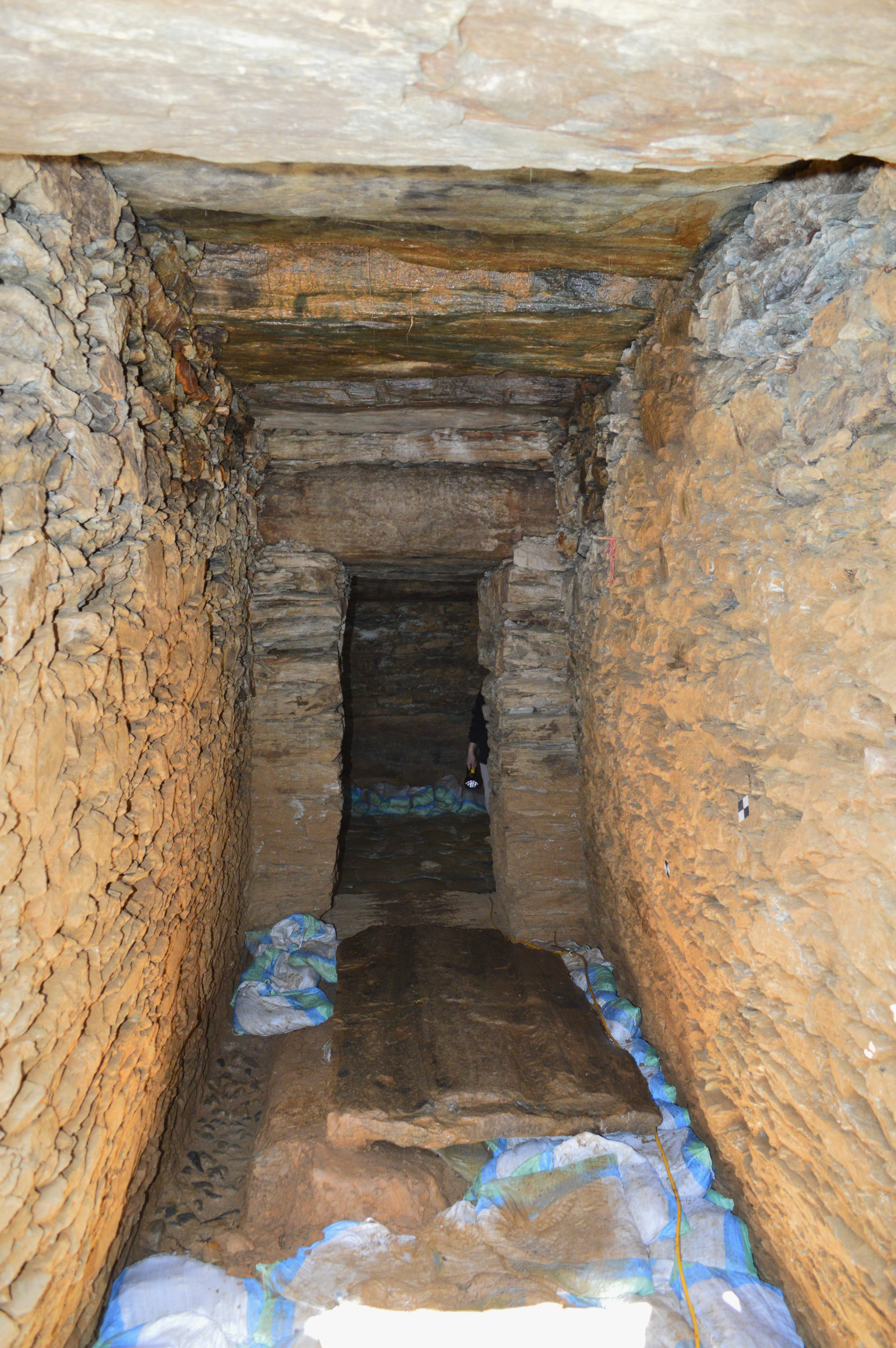
The stone chamber of Ishibutai Kofun

Secondly, there is the theory of the front part of the altar. William Gowland believed as early as 1897 that the front part was an altar, because the tomb chambers of Zenpokoenfun were all in the back circular part, while the front part was not, and fragments of ritual objects were occasionally unearthed on the surface of the front part. Umehara Sueji and Rokuji Morimoto also agree with this statement and believe that the central details of the house-shaped disc wheel unearthed are reminiscent of ancestral halls. Kita Sadakichi believes that the front part is the place where the coin bearer is used to declare his destiny above it, and Hamada Farming also mentioned this, pointing out that during the Edo period, some people had already named the front part the declaration field, reflecting the function of the altar. Yukio Kobayashi also believes that the front part is closer to the altar. On the other hand, in support of this statement, Saiichi Goto also mentioned that due to the lack of ritual objects such as earthenware and Sakurai in the front section, this viewpoint cannot be confirmed. At the same time, Takahashi Kenji believed that the front part also had accompanying burial situations and should not be regarded as an altar. He also advocated that the front part and the circular part, like the sanctuary between the main hall of a Shinto shrine and the birdhouse, should display this deep structure to bring a sense of solemnity. Therefore, the front part should be regarded as a Torii. The most powerful statement to date is that the front section was referred to as the altar in a book written by Akira Chongmatsu in 1978.

The third theory is about the origin of the mainland. In 1926, Rokuji Morimoto proposed that Zenpokoenfun were modeled after tombs in mainland China. Nishijima Tsuyoshi advocated that Himiko was crowned as Cao Rui by Emperor Ming of Wei in the 39th year of Empress Jingū reign (239). As a result, it was necessary to build a tomb that met his identity, with the surrounding area coming from the circular mound sacrifice to Heaven and the square mound dedicated to the earth. At the same time, Emperor Wu of Wei was also dedicated to the circular mound, while Empress Dowager Bian was dedicated to the square mound. The situation of Zenpokoenfun is that Okimi and the gods and earth are only worshipped together. Therefore, the construction of the Zenpokoenfun not only demonstrated authority both inside and outside but also made up for the lack of sacrificial functions of the Yamato Kingship, such as circular mounds, square mounds, ancestral temples, etc. Later, it evolved into the creation and construction of Jongmyo (shrine) around the mounds as altars. (Note: The altar sign refers to the place where sacrifices are held.) Yukio Yamato also mentioned that during the 66th year of the Regency of Empress Jingū's reign (266 AD), when he sent envoys to pay tribute to the Western Jin Dynasty, during the winter solstice of the same year, he went to the front and back circular two layer altar built at Weisu Mountain (now Yusugu Dui, Yibin District, Luoyang, Henan, China) to observe the ceremony of Emperor Wu of Jin worshipping his father, Emperor Wen of Jin (Sima Zhao), grandfather, Emperor Gaozu of Jin (Sima Yi), and Wufang Shangdi. At the time of the Western Jin Dynasty, the suburban worship was held by the emperor alone on a square and circular mixed altar built naturally according to the hilly terrain, offering sacrifices to the heavens and ancestors. It was pointed out that after the envoy returned to Japan, the front circular tomb suddenly appeared in the middle of the 3rd century. In addition, Yoshihiro Hanoi cited the concept of "using crushed stones to cover each body thinly" in the "Longsha Chronicles" written by Shiji, and referred to it as the "human-shaped crushed stone tomb", pointing out that it was similar to the Zenpokoenfun. He also mentioned that they are the result of the maximization based on their prototype, which is a creative product of ancient people. (Note: Double tombs, also known as double round tombs or ladle-shaped tombs, as the name suggests, are ancient tombs formed by the combination of two round tombs, which are an uncommon form of ancient tombs in Japan.) Fujisawa, on the other hand, pointed out that Zenpokoenfun originated from the Dahuting Han Tomb. In the early stage, most of them were vertical cave-style stone chambers, which were influenced by Korea. Higuchi Takahiko believed that they originated from the Mawangdui Han Tomb, and Tsuyoshi Shimamatsu criticized his claim, pointing out that they were closer to the double tombs in Silla and, if they were closer, more like the Noin-Ula burial site. At the same time, Mihara Moji and Suzuki both believed that the front and rear circular tombs were related to the Noin-Ula burial site. And it is advocated that Zenpokoenfun are derived from the Tianyuan place of Taoism, built on the basis of Han tombs such as Dahuting.

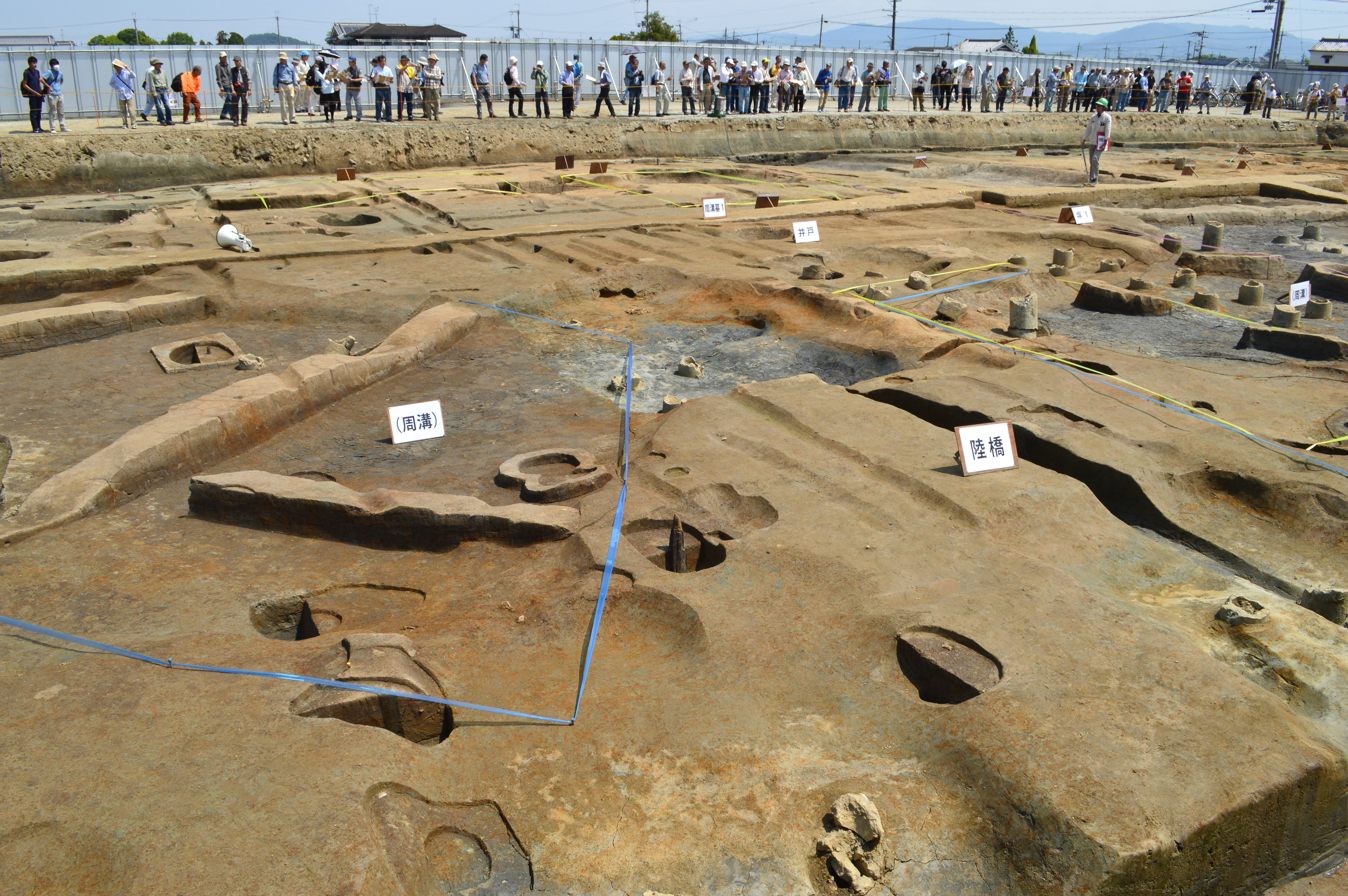
Circular groove tomb at Seta Ruin

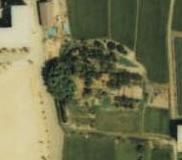
Makimuku Ishizuka Kofun

The fourth is related to the period of the Yai Sheng era, where Jin Guanshu believed that the Zenpokoenfun was originally a sacrificial site during the Yayoi period. Kondo Yoshiro proposed that Zenpokoenfun originated from the Yoshiyama Tomb, with the front part being the protruding part of the four corner protruding tomb mound. Afterwards, Zenpokoenfun spread throughout Japan, forming the order of Zenpokoenfun. The Yoshiyama Burial Culture Center stated that Zenpokoenfun originated from the Yoshiyama Tomb, and pointed out that Kofun at that time were surrounded by Zhou trenches, leaving only one connection between land and Kofun, known as the land bridge, and that earthenware for ceremonies was found near it, and the land bridge gradually expanded to form Zenpokoenfun, which is currently a powerful statement. On May 12, 2016, the Nara Institute of Culture and Finance discovered a circular tomb at the Seta Ruins in Kashihara, Nara Prefecture. It was pointed out that the Zenpokoenfun evolved from this tomb into a tombstone after winding towards the tombstone. Hiroshi Ishino believes that this circular tomb can be one of the origins of the Zenpokoenfun.

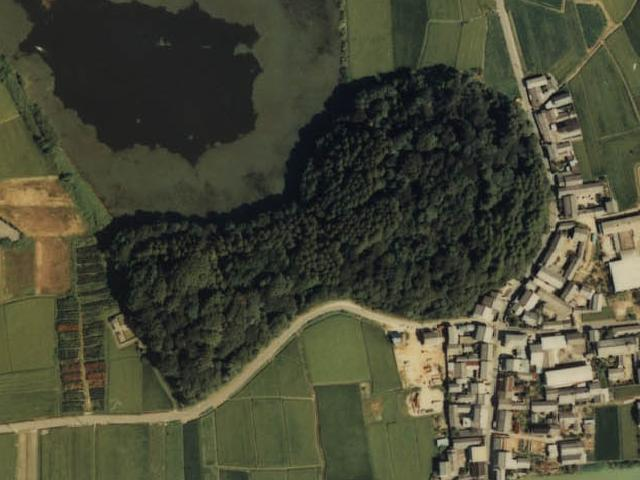
Hashihaka Kofun

In addition, there is a theory of combining two tombs. In 1906, Kenji Kiyono proposed that Zenpokoenfun were developed separately from the main tomb and the accompanying tomb, and ultimately merged into one. Neil Gordon Monroe believed that Japanese people like triangles and created Zenpokoenfun by combining them. In addition, Mihara Moji also inherited William Gowland's statement that Zenpokoenfun was formed by combining circular and square graves. Saito Tadao and Hamada Genshin proposed the idea that the front and rear circular graves were naturally formed based on the terrain of the hills. Hamada later withdrew this claim, and Masaki Yabo also believed that both this and Neil Gordon Menruo's claims lacked persuasiveness. He also said that the claims of Seino and Mihara were difficult to verify, but only inherited the theory of the time.

== History ==
After the mid-19th century, large-scale Zenpokoenfun began to appear in Western Japan. Examples of Kansai region include Kofun of Tokuchi in Sakurai, Nara Prefecture, the Kofun of Tsui Otsuzuyama in Kizugawa, Kyoto Prefecture, the Kofun of Ujima Tezuyama in Okayama, Okayama Prefecture, and the Kofun of Ishibutai in Kanda, Fukuoka Prefecture. At the same time, there were also Zenpokoenfun in Chūgoku region and Kyushu. For example, the ancient tombs of Motoshi Inawa in the city of Asahi, Kyoto Prefecture, and the ancient tombs of Tomikaga in the city of Okayama, among others, the largest one is the Tokutoma ancient tomb. The total length of the mound is about 280 meters, which is more than three times larger than the largest mound tomb of about 80 meters in the later period of the Yayoi period, and its area and capacity are far greater than the latter. Although the mound tombs with a front and back circular shape were already scattered throughout Japan during the Yayoi period, the early forms of the Zenpokoenfun were mostly vertical cave-style stone chambers with bamboo-shaped wooden coffins, which were different from the mound tombs during the Yayoi period. Moreover, early Zenpokoenfun had common features, such as a lower and wider front part compared to the back circular part, and the combination and position of grave goods were the same. Inside the coffin were jade and mirrors, while outside the coffin were a large number of triangular edge divine beast mirrors, iron weapons, agricultural and fishing tools, and so on. Regarding this, Taiichiro Shiraishi believed that at that time, various forces in Kino, led by the Yamatai Kingdom, and the Seto Inland Sea formed an alliance, and obtained iron and various cultural relics from Korea by defeating forces such as Nukoku and the Ito Kingdoms, which controlled the Genkai Sea. On the other hand, Yoshiro Kondo also mentioned that most of the Zenpokoenfun built on flat land were well organized, and the mounds were also built layer by layer after consolidation. Considering the slope and arrangement of the mounds, circular mounds were constructed. In addition, bronze mirrors from mainland China and the "Wajinden" from the same period indicate that there was an exchange between the two countries at that time. Therefore, it is speculated that the early appearance of the Zenpokoenfun may have been influenced by civil engineering technology from mainland China, and the political and ideological influence is reflected in the joint construction of the Zenpokoenfun by various alliance members as proof of the alliance.

At the same time, there are also tombs 5, 4, and 3 of the Kamen Mun in the front of the Houyuan Tomb in Eastern Japan during the same period as Ishibutai Kofun. Among them, tomb 5 is the earliest Kofun in Eastern Japan's history, indicating a possible connection between the Kazusa Province and the Yamatai Kingdom at that time. In the 4th century, Hokuriku region, Kantō region, Tōkai region and Tōhoku region were mainly composed of front and rear tombs, which gradually became Zenpokoenfun two to three generations later. Regarding this, Yamato Takeru pointed out that although the "Kojiki" and "Nihon Shoki" mentioned that the Four Generals and Japanese Takezun and others had merged East Japan into the territory of the Japanese monarchy through multiple expeditions, he believed that it was actually Kununokuni located in the Nōbi Plain that formed an alliance in East Japan mainly consisting of rear graves in the past and that after the death of Himiko, they lost the battle with the Yamatai Kingdom or negotiated peace under the leadership of the Yamato Kingship. In the end, the alliance of the Dog Slave Kingdom and the alliance of the Evil Horse Kingdom merged into one, forming the Japanese monarchy. Then, the leaders of East and West Japan were distinguished by the Zenpokoenfun and the front and rear tombs. From the end of the 4th century to the 5th century, large Zenpokoenfun resembling Kofun in Mount Taida began to appear in present-day Gunma Prefecture. Large Zenpokoenfun have also been built in places such as Yamanashi Prefecture, Ibaraki Prefecture, and Chiba Prefecture.

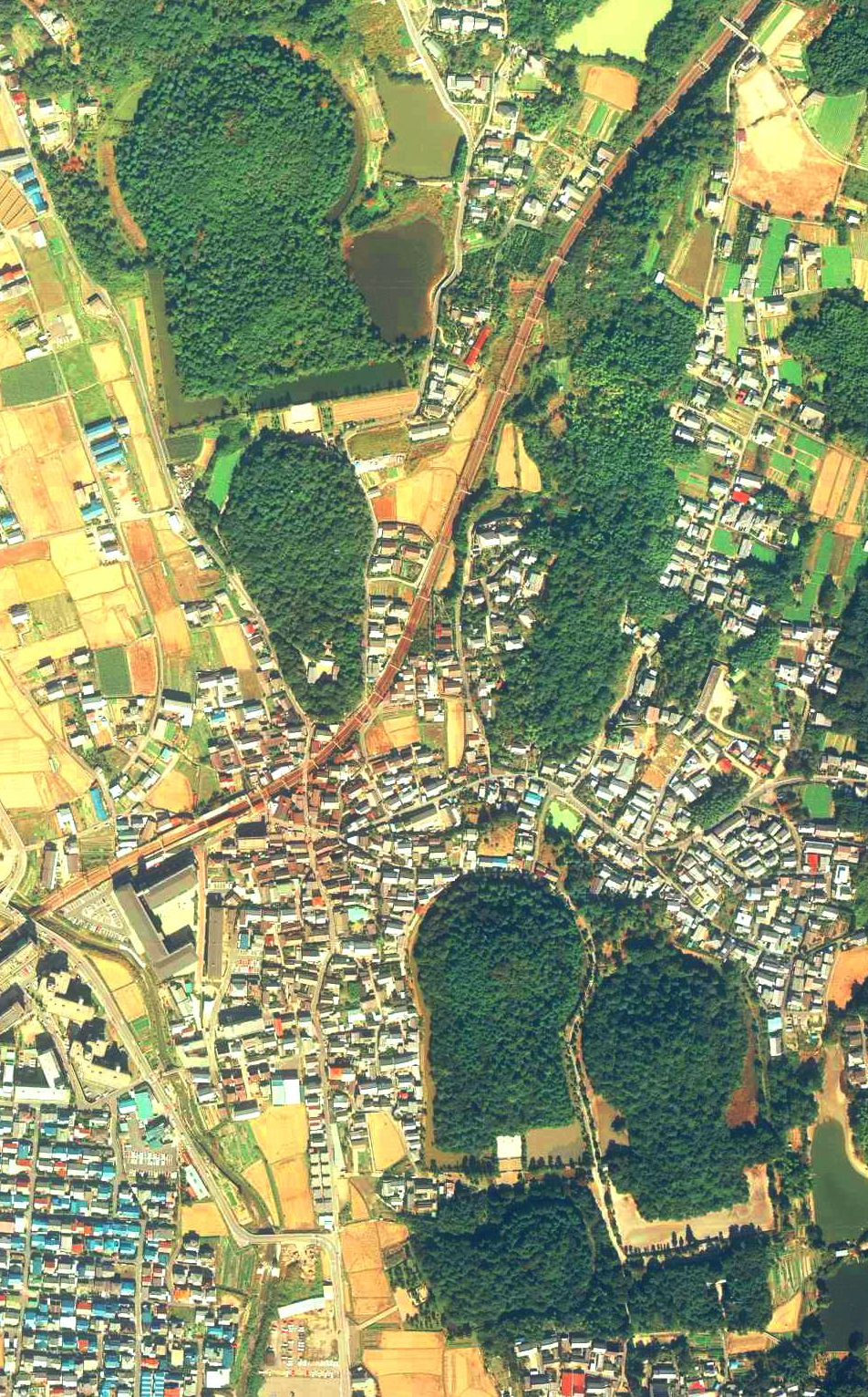
Zuoji Dun Liegu Tomb Group

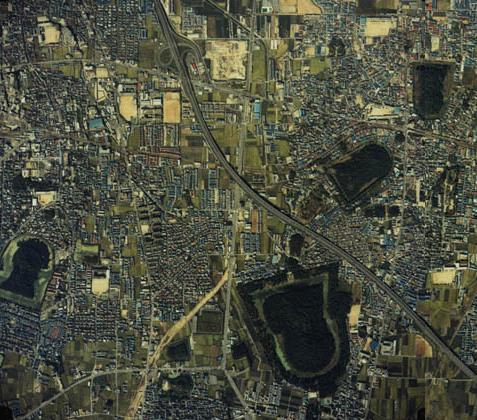
Gushi Ancient Tomb Group

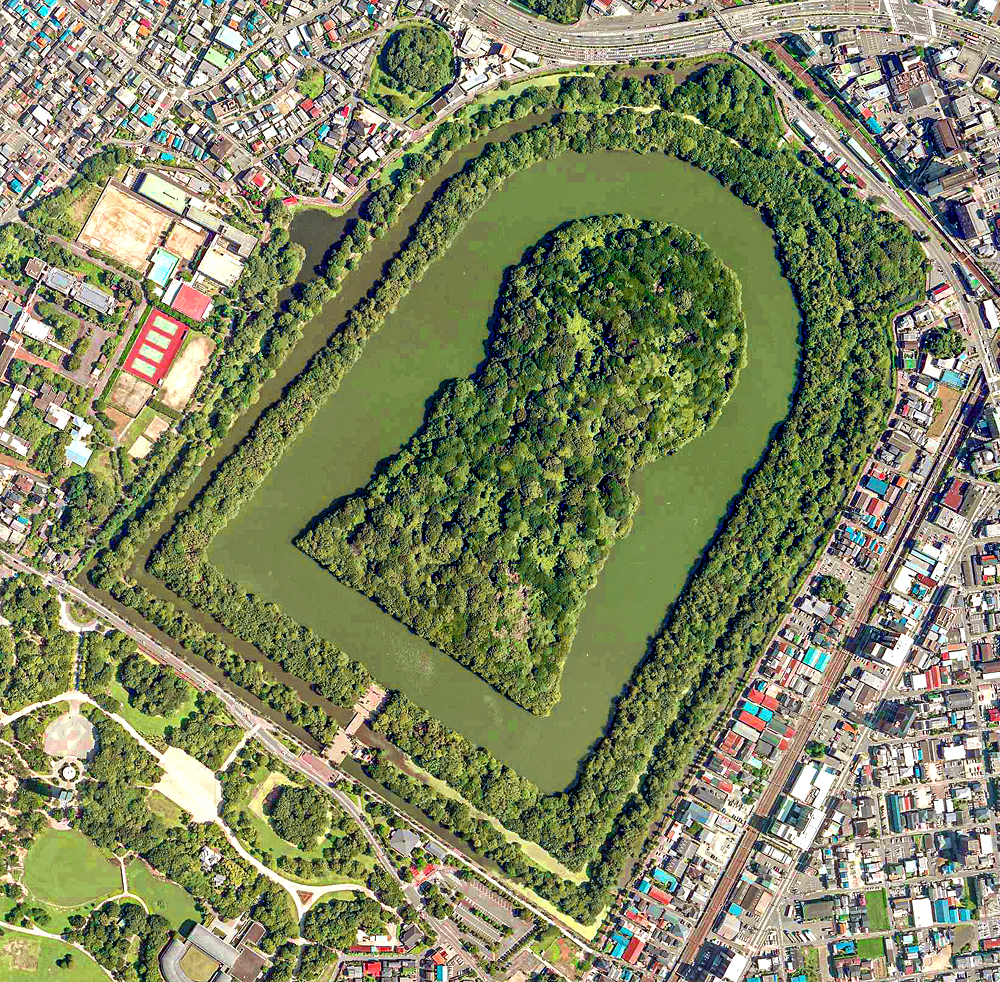
Daisen Kofun in the Hundred Tongue Bird Ancient Tomb Group

After the mid-4th century, the Dawa Tombs, originally centered around the Yamato Kofun in the southeast of the Nara Basin and the Ryuben Kofun, gradually shifted to the Daisen Kofun in the north. The large Zenpokoenfun of Dawa was the Furuichi Kofun Cluster and Mozu Tombs. The center of gravity of the Great King's Tomb shifted again in the 5th century to the ancient city tomb group and the hundred-tongued bird tomb group in the Osaka Plain. Regarding the reasons for the multiple transfers of these large Zenpokoenfun, based on research on the "Kushiji" and "Nihonshu Ji", the Japanese academic community has proposed views such as the theory of dynasty alternation and the theory of equestrian tribes conquering dynasties to explain. On the other hand, Hirose Kazuo proposed that the structures of the Sasaki, Koji, Shizuki, and Makino ancient tomb groups were similar, and from the late 4th century to the second half of the 5th century, the heads of the four ancient tomb groups jointly played a role in the Yamato Kingship. After death, they deified as the guardian deity of the Yamato royal power and also proposed that the construction of the large Zenpokoenfun had a deterrent effect on various regions. At the same time, in the second half of the 5th century, no large-scale Zenpokoenfun were constructed in areas such as Kibi Province, Upper Maoye, and Hyūga Province, and the scale of the Zenpokoenfun in Gokishichidō gradually decreased. According to the inscriptions on Ji Ji, the iron sword unearthed from the Inawa Mountain Kofun, and the large sword unearthed from the Eta Funayama Kofun, Emperor Yūryaku at that time regarded himself as the king of the world, and his authority was reflected in the fact that only he continued to build large Zenpokoenfun in the Japanese archipelago.

In the 6th century, the horizontal cave-style stone chamber of the Kinai system began to be popularized in Zenpokoenfun. At the same time, they began to appear in areas such as Settsu Province, Owari Province, Uji Province, and even in Kantō region, which were considered as bases for the establishment of the Emperor Keitai. Among them, Ueno had a particularly large number of Zenpokoenfun, compared to only 39 in Kōzuke Province during the same period. Ueno alone had 97, while in Kanto there were 216. As both Kino and Oizhang decreased, Only the Kanto region continued to construct large Zenpokoenfun throughout the 6th century, indicating that the Yamato monarchy at that time relied heavily on the Eastern Kingdom in both economic and military aspects. From the end of the 6th century to the beginning of the 7th century, large square and circular tombs replaced the front and became the mainstream. In the middle of the 7th century, they evolved into octagonal tombs. Regarding the reason for the cessation of construction of Zenpokoenfun, Taiichiro Shiraishi believes that it is related to the reforms of Crown Prince Shōtoku and Soga no Umako, as well as the establishment of the national manufacturing system, while the final Zenpokoenfun are believed to be Asama Mountain Kofun, and Rongmachi claims that tKofun were built in the first half of the 7th century.

== Structure ==
Zenpokoenfun is divided into the front part, the back circular part, and the middle part. Du Chubi Lv Zhi believes that the front part originated from the protruding part of the tomb mound during the Yai Sheng era (張り出し部). The earliest front part was in a curved shape, while the later front part was all in a straight line, representing ancient tombs such as the chopsticks tomb. Afterward, the height of the front part decreases, while the middle part becomes smaller, shaped like a hand mirror, hence it is also known as a handle mirror shape, representing the ancient tomb of Sakurai Chasusan. The front part of the Baolai Mountain Kofun is as high as the Sakurai Chasusan Kofun, and the middle part is larger without a circular trench. The tomb chamber is shaped like a clay coffin or a vertical cave stone chamber. These early Kofun are mostly located at the protruding parts of hills, ridges, or edges of tables, and scallop-shaped ancient tombs also have the characteristics of early Kofun. Therefore, some opinions believe that scallop-shaped ancient tombs are similar to the front and back circular tombs in a broad sense. During the same period as the Baolai Mountain Kofun, the front part of the ancient tomb led by the Zuojilingshan Kofun was shorter. Afterward, the middle stage ancient tombs of Zenpokoenfun were mostly built on flat or vast terraces. The front part was wider, comparable to the diameter of the back circular part, and could be used for entry and exit. They were also used as burial chambers, with an increase in height. The middle details were built, and multiple horse hoofs shaped Zhou Hao tombs were also built on the periphery. These types of Zenpokoenfun are not only numerous but also large in scale, representing the ancient tombs of Yutian Yumiaoshan. Subsequently, a longer front and rear circular tomb appeared, indicating that the ancient tomb was the Daisen Kofun. The final form of the tomb in the front and back images is the late ancient tomb, which can be found in both hills and flat areas. The front part is higher and wider than the diameter of the circular part, while the interior is mostly a horizontal cave-style stone chamber. This type of ancient tomb, led by the Tushi Yuling Kofun, combines the characteristics of the Yutian Yumiaoshan Kofun and the Daisen Kofun and is on average longer than the Yutian Yumiaoshan Kofun type. The scale of the mounds of ancient tombs in the later period generally decreased in the Gyeonggi area, while the practice of constructing large Zenpokoenfun is still maintained in other places.

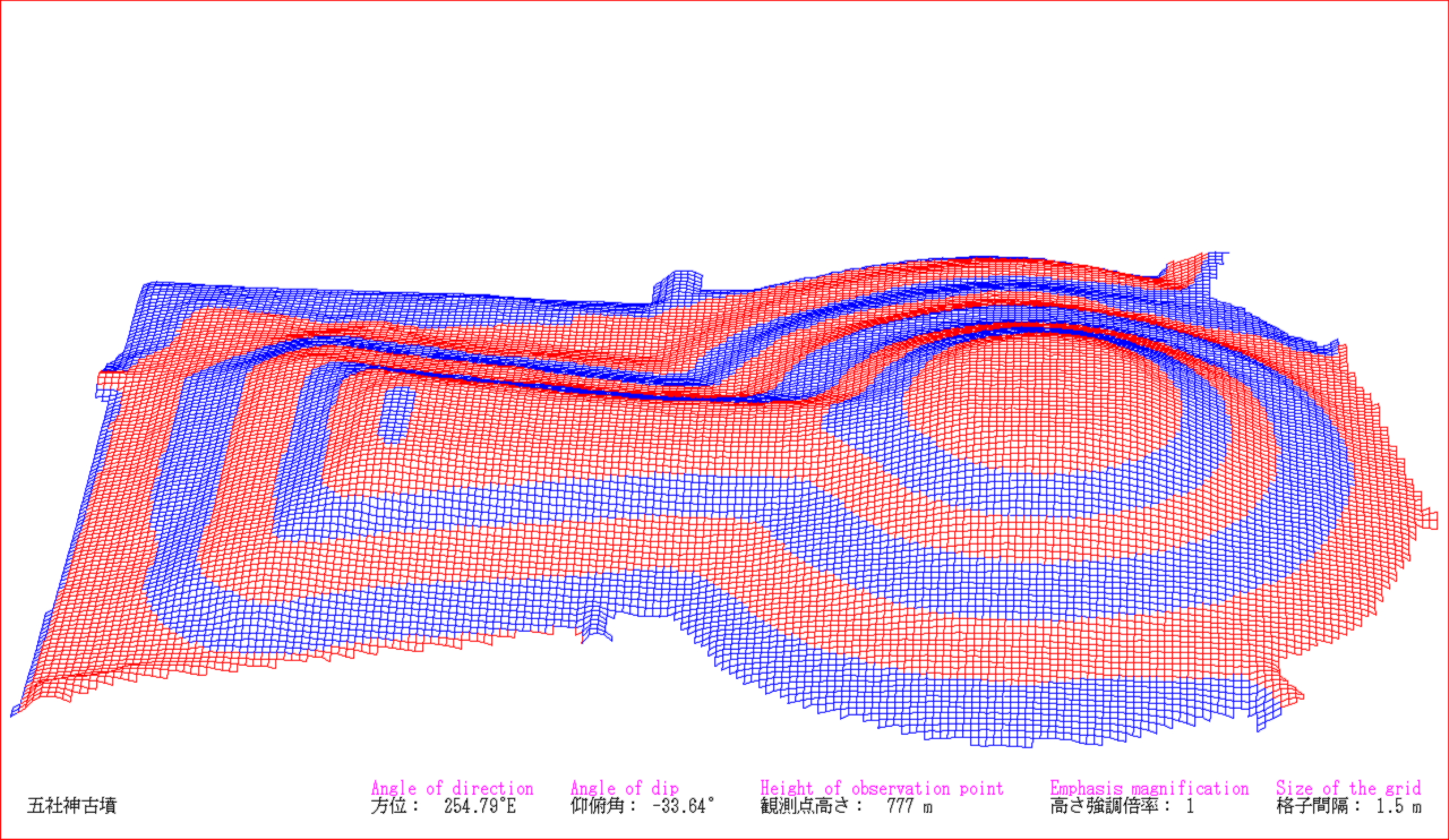
Early Kofun period (Gosashi Kofun)

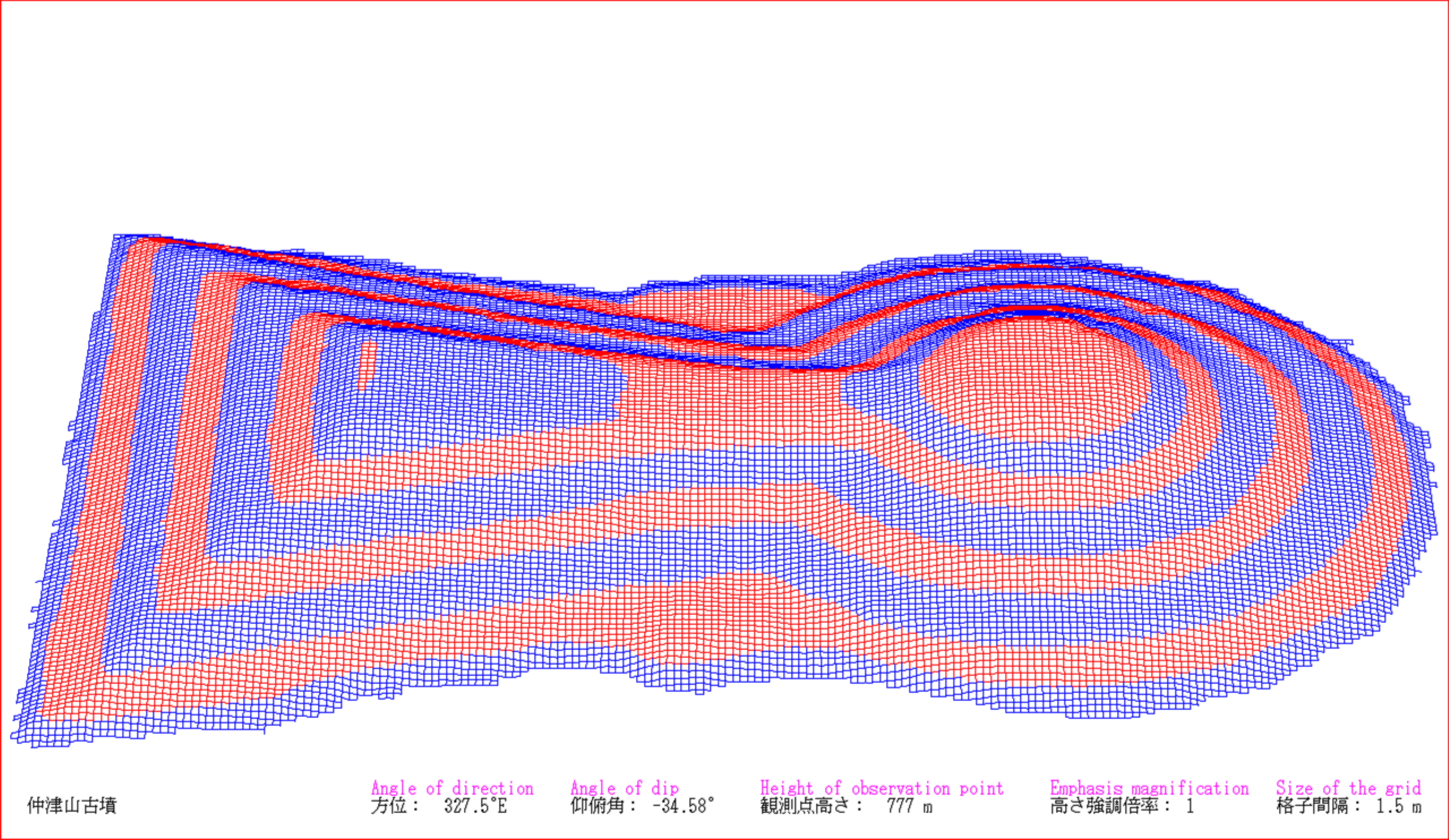
Mid-Kofun period (Nakatsuyama Kofun)

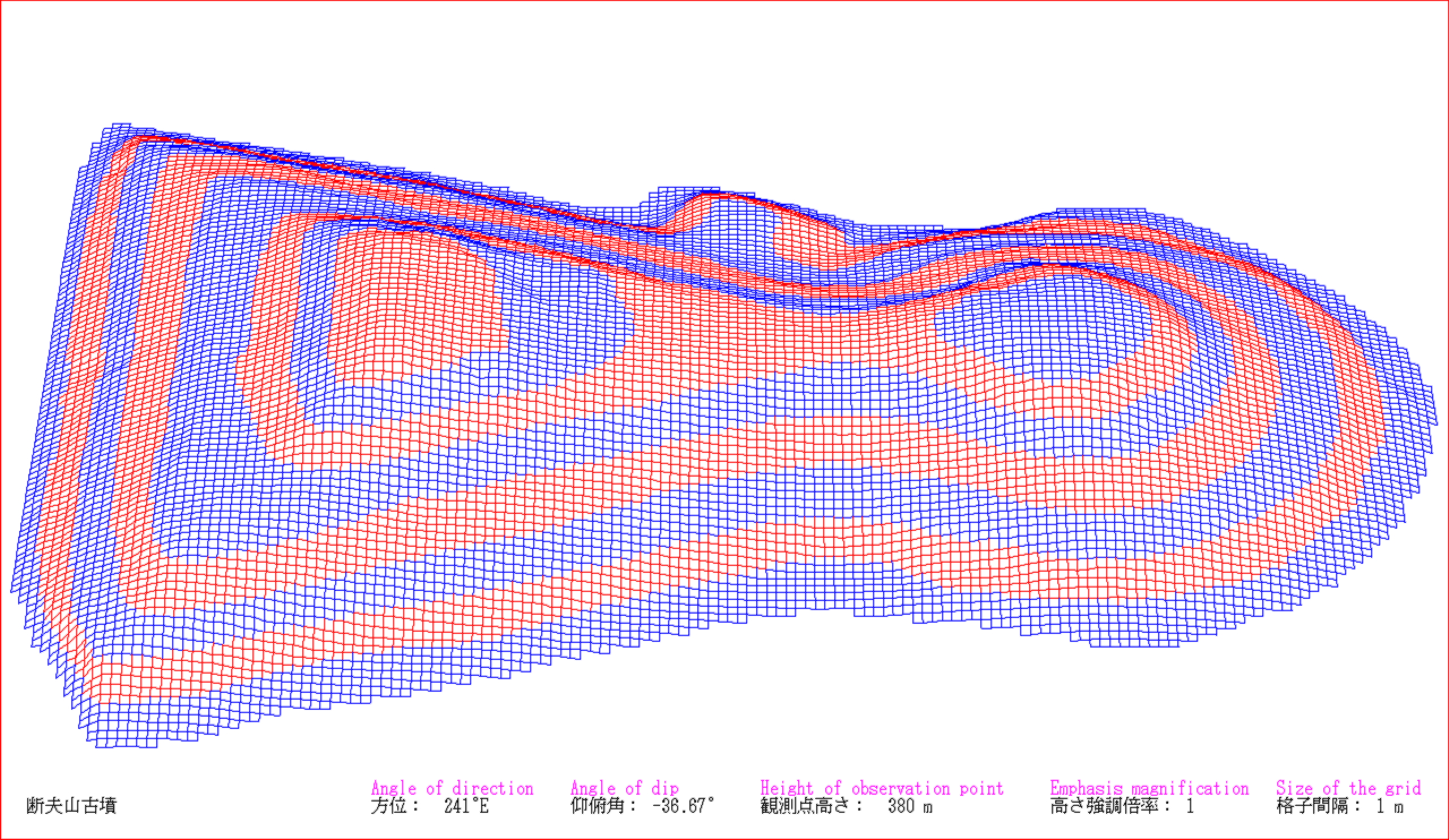
Late Kofun period (Danpusan Kofun)

3D computer graphics of Kofun from different periods

== Distribution ==
Distribution of tombs in the Kofun Period

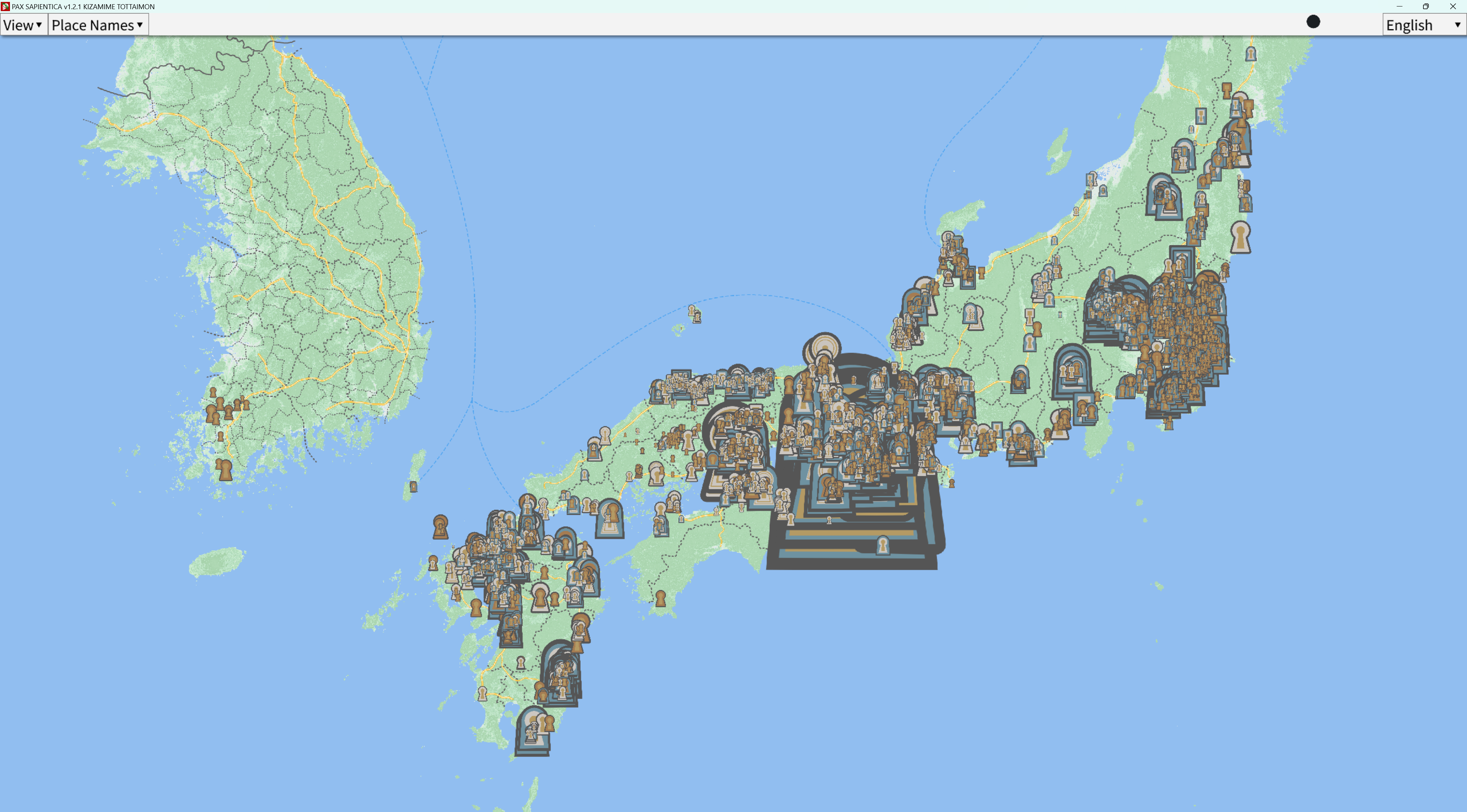
Distribution of Zenpokoenfun

The northernmost and southernmost Zenpokoenfun

According to Hirose Kazuo, there are a total of about 5200 Zenpokoenfun (including front and rear graves) in Japan, distributed in various parts of Japan outside Hokkaido, Tohoku, and Okinawa. There are 302 graves over 100 meters long, of which 140 are located in Yamato Province, Kawachi Province, Izumi Province, Sezu Province, and Yamashiro Province, far surpassing Ueno in second place and Yoshibe in third place. At the same time, there are only 35 rear circular tombs located over 200 meters ahead, of which 32 are located in the city. The three exceptions are Zaoshan Kofun located in Jibei, Tsukuriyama Kofun (Okayama), and Tsukuriyama Kofun (Sōja) located in Ueno.

On the other hand, the number given by the database of Nara Women's University is 4764, which is distributed in all parts of Japan except Hokkaido, Akita, Aomori and Okinawa. 306 graves are more than 100 meters long, and 36 graves are more than 200 meters long, while the prefecture with the most burial mounds is Chiba Prefecture, with a total of 693. The least distributed prefecture is Iwate Prefecture, with only one, namely, Tsunozuka Kofun. At the same time, it is the northernmost front circular tomb in Japan, and the southernmost is the ancient tomb of Higashima in Kimotsuki District, Kagoshima Prefecture. In addition, the only countries in the old system that did not have Zenpokoenfun were Awaji Province, Izu Province, and Sado Province.

== See also ==
- Corridor-type kofun (横穴式石室, yokoana-shiki sekishitsu)
- Empun
- Hotategai-gata
- Joenkahofun
- Octagonal Kofun
- Square-type kofun
- Zenpō-kōhō-fun (前方後方墳)
