= List of cities in Fukuoka Prefecture by population =

The following list sorts all cities (including towns and villages) in the Japanese prefecture of Fukuoka with a population of more than 10,000 according to the 2020 Census. As of October 1, 2020, 51 places fulfill this criterion and are listed here. This list refers only to the population of individual cities, towns and villages within their defined limits, which does not include other municipalities or suburban areas within urban agglomerations.

== List ==
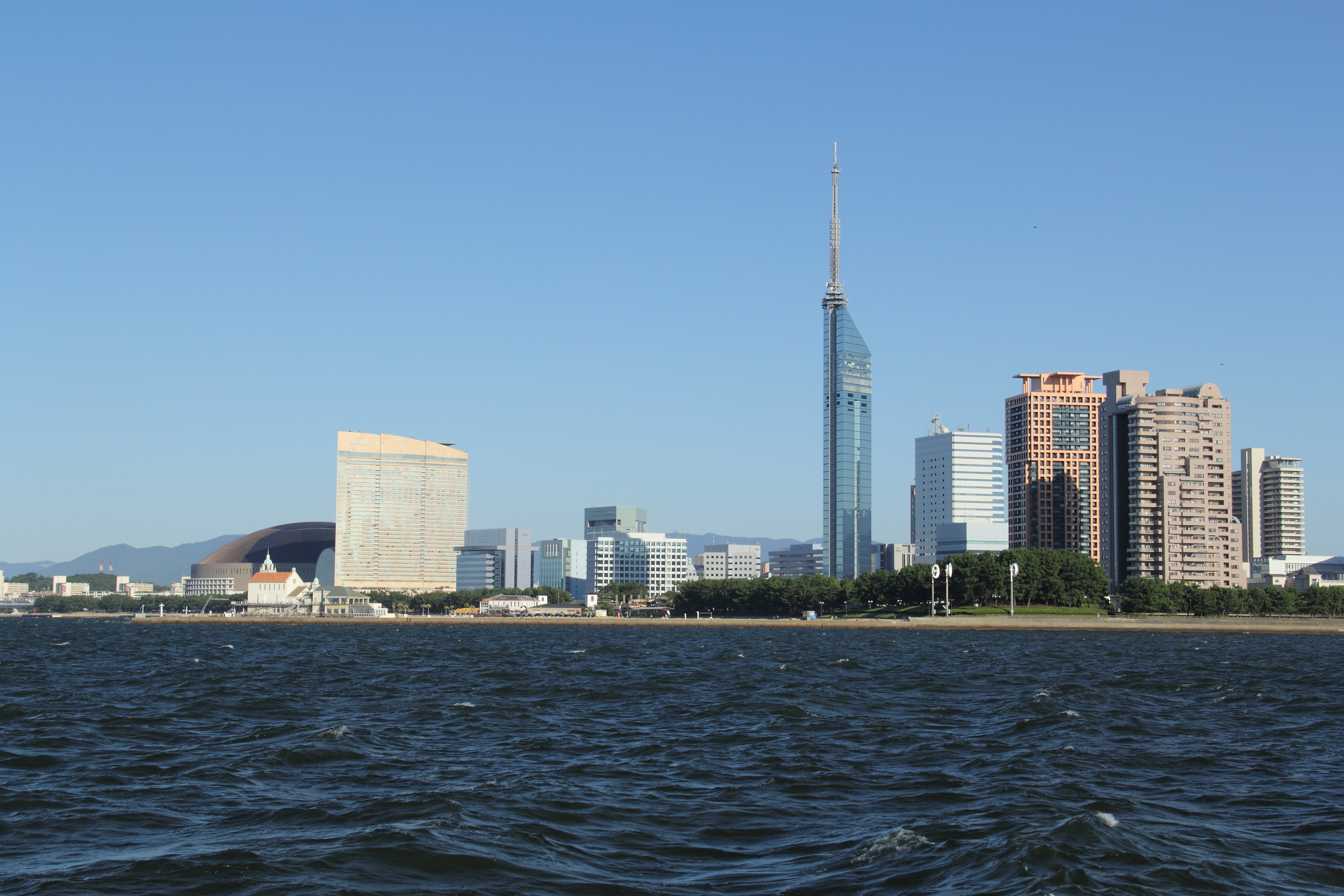
Fukuoka

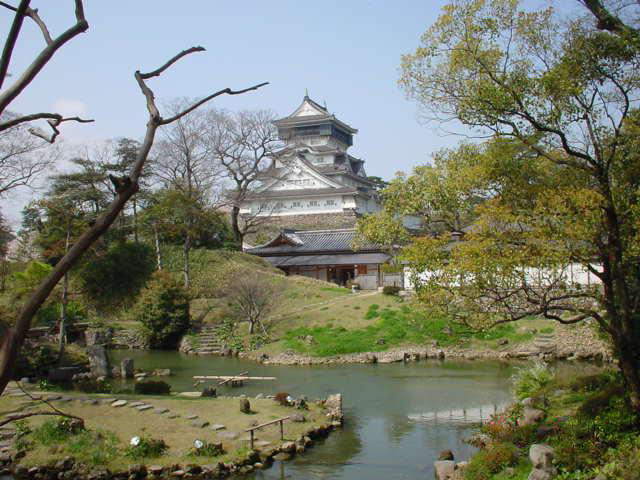
Kitakyūshū

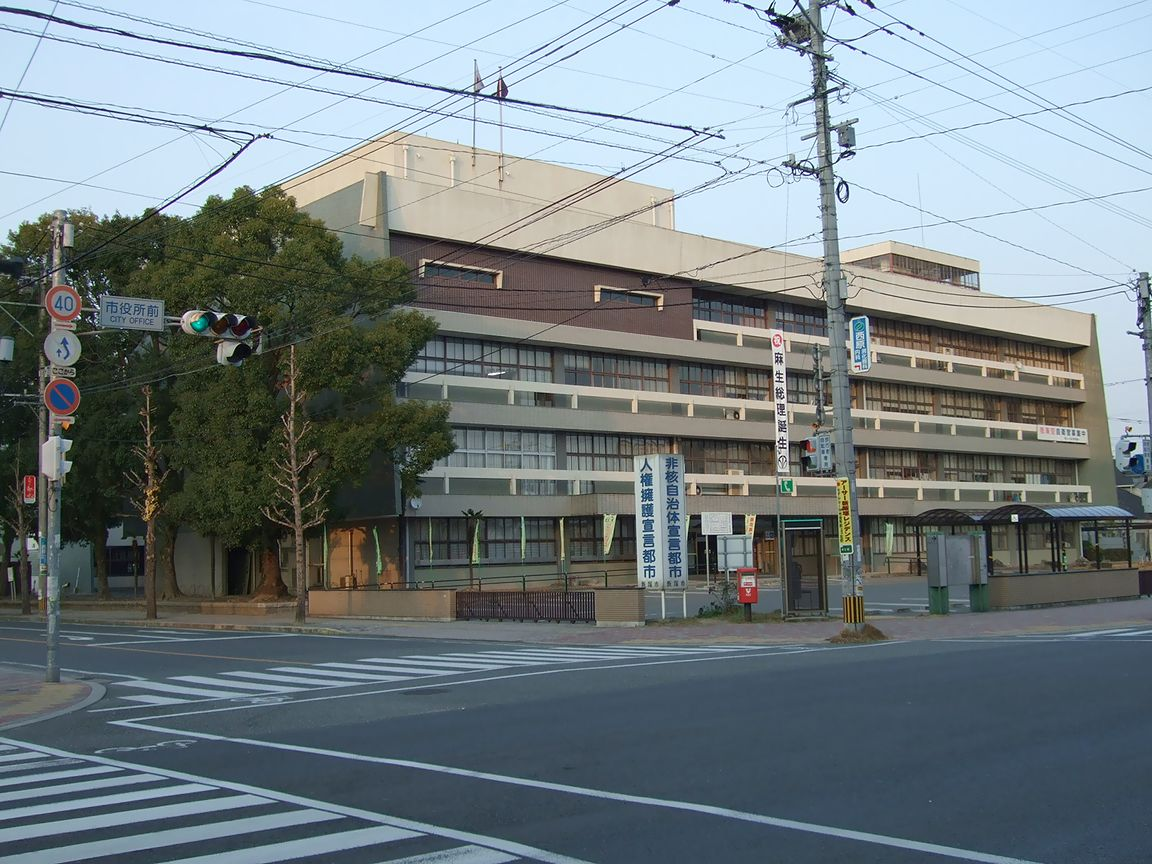
Iizuka

The following table lists the 51 cities, towns and villages in Fukuoka with a population of at least 10,000 on October 1, 2020, according to the 2020 Census. The table also gives an overview of the evolution of the population since the 1995 census.

Rank (2020)	Name	Status	2020	2015	2010	2005	2000	1995
1	Fukuoka	City	1,613,361	1,538,681	1,463,743	1,401,279	1,341,470	1,284,836
2	Kitakyūshū	City	939,622	961,286	976,846	993,525	1,011,471	1,019,598
3	Kurume	City	303,496	304,552	302,402	306,434	304,884	302,741
4	Iizuka	City	126,486	129,146	131,492	133,357	136,701	140,463
5	Ōmuta	City	111,379	117,360	123,638	131,090	138,629	145,085
6	Kasuga	City	111,097	110,743	106,780	108,402	105,219	99,165
7	Chikushino	City	103,374	101,081	100,172	97,571	93,049	81,712
8	Ōnojō	City	102,172	99,525	95,087	92,748	89,414	82,903
9	Itoshima	City	98,945	96,475	98,435	97,974	95,040	88,691
10	Munakata	City	97,158	96,516	95,501	94,148	92,056	86,938
11	Dazaifu	City	73,286	72,168	70,482	67,087	66,099	64,913
12	Yukuhashi	City	71,501	70,586	70,468	70,070	69,737	67,833
13	Fukutsu	City	67,141	58,781	55,431	55,677	55,778	54,144
14	Yanagawa	City	64,540	67,777	71,375	74,539	77,612	79,806
15	Yame	City	60,653	64,408	69,057	73,262	76,689	79,492
16	Ogōri	City	59,408	57,983	58,499	57,481	54,583	50,888
17	Koga	City	58,831	57,959	57,920	55,943	55,476	51,244
18	Nōgata	City	56,287	57,146	57,686	57,497	59,182	61,623
19	Asakura	City	50,342	52,444	56,355	59,385	61,707	62,593
20	Nakagawa	City	50,142	50,004	49,780	46,972	45,548	42,345
21	Chikugo	City	48,867	48,339	48,512	47,844	47,348	45,289
22	Kasuya	Town	48,216	45,360	41,997	37,685	34,811	31,504
23	Shime	Town	46,390	45,256	43,564	40,557	37,794	36,199
24	Tagawa	City	46,235	48,441	50,605	51,534	54,027	56,547
25	Nakama	City	40,373	41,796	44,210	46,560	48,032	49,353
26	Umi	Town	37,701	37,927	38,592	39,136	38,126	36,728
27	Kanda	Town	37,691	34,963	36,005	34,387	35,604	35,072
28	Miyama	City	35,908	38,139	40,732	43,372	45,708	47,928
29	Kama	City	35,515	38,743	42,589	45,929	48,378	50,804
30	Ōkawa	City	33,010	34,838	37,448	39,213	41,338	43,341
31	Shingū	Town	32,945	30,344	24,679	23,447	22,431	19,227
32	Sasaguri	Town	31,228	31,210	31,318	30,985	29,389	26,314
33	Okagaki	Town	31,027	31,580	32,119	31,332	30,417	28,807
34	Chikuzen	Town	29,615	29,306	29,155	29,353	28,926	27,078
35	Sue	Town	28,646	27,263	26,044	25,601	25,086	24,125
36	Mizumaki	Town	28,138	28,997	30,021	30,679	31,623	31,289
37	Ukiha	City	28,012	29,509	31,640	32,902	34,045	35,179
38	Miyawaka	City	26,327	28,112	30,081	30,630	31,225	32,197
39	Buzen	City	24,411	25,940	27,031	28,104	29,133	29,716
40	Fukuchi	Town	21,424	22,871	24,714	25,543	26,375	27,031
41	Hirokawa	Town	19,988	20,183	20,253	20,248	19,779	19,437
42	Miyako	Town	18,838	20,243	21,572	22,898	23,767	24,689
43	Onga	Town	18,736	18,877	19,160	19,279	19,309	18,999
44	Chikujō	Town	17,202	18,587	19,544	20,837	21,848	23,070
45	Tachiarai	Town	15,529	15,138	15,284	15,400	15,227	14,755
46	Kawasaki	Town	15,190	16,789	18,264	20,115	20,190	21,276
47	Kurate	Town	15,094	16,007	17,088	18,204	19,266	20,248
48	Ōki	Town	13,824	14,176	14,350	14,282	13,862	13,525
49	Ashiya	Town	13,561	14,208	15,369	16,247	15,827	16,685
50	Keisen	Town	12,895	13,496	13,863	14,535	14,760	14,667
51	Kawara	Town	10,198	10,861	11,685	12,369	13,104	13,892
