= Ashiya, Fukuoka =

Ashiya 芦屋町
- Town
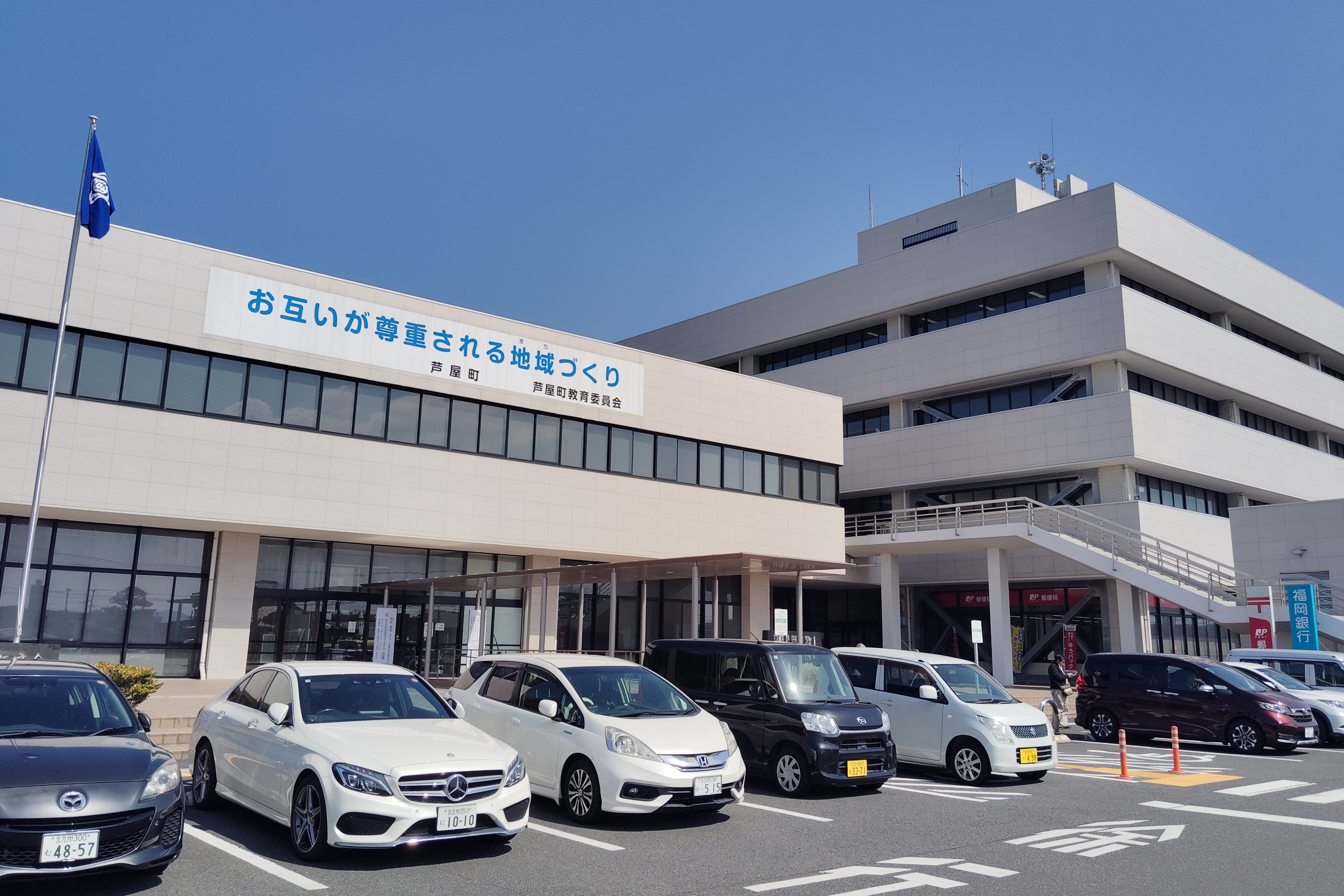
- Ashiya Town hall

- Flag Chapter
- Interactive map of Ashiya
- Location in Japan
- Coordinates: 33°53′38″N 130°39′50″E
- Country: Japan
- Region: Kyushu
- Prefecture: Fukuoka
- District: Onga

Area
  - Total: 11.60 km^{2} (4.48 sq mi)

Population (February 29, 2024)
  - Total: 12,930
  - Density: 1,115/km^{2} (2,887/sq mi)
- Time zone: UTC+09:00 (JST)
- Website: Official website
- Symbols
- Flower: Crinum asiaticum
- Tree: Black Pine

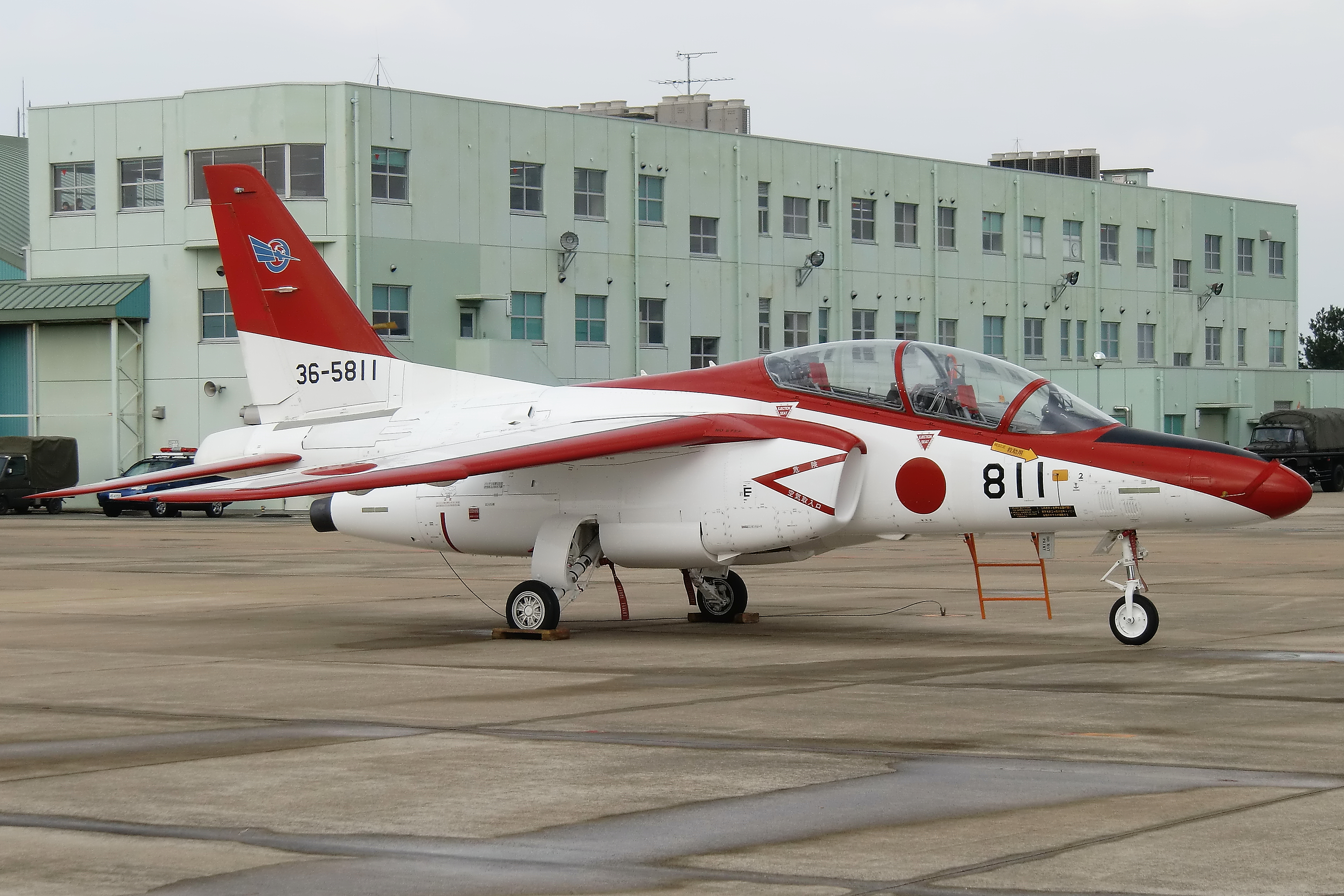
Ashiya Air Field

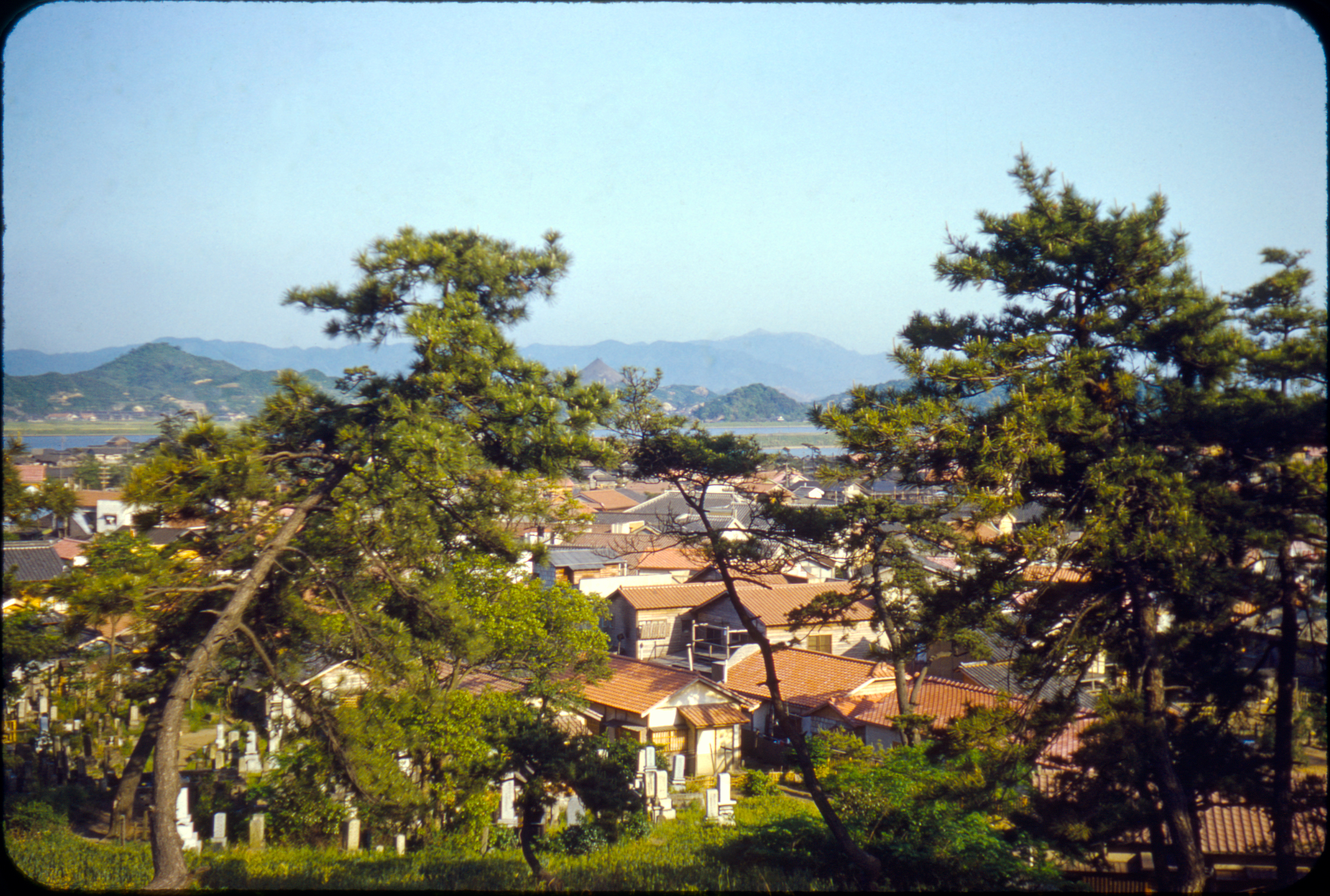
Ashiya in 1955

Ashiya (芦屋町, Ashiya-machi) is a town located in Onga District, Fukuoka Prefecture, Japan. As of 29 February 2024, the town had an estimated population of 12,930 in 6450 households, and a population density of 1100 persons per km^{2}. The total area of the town is 11.60 km^{2} (4.48 sq mi).

== Geography ==
Ashiya is located at the mouth of the Onga River in north-central Fukuoka Prefecture, and is part of the Kitakyushu metropolitan area. The urban area is on both banks of the mouth of the Onga River, with the town hall and urban center are located on the west bank, along with the Japan Air Self-Defense Force Ashiya Base and Ashiya Boat Race Course. Furthermore, the Onga River has a large water area, and the actual habitable area is only 7.37 km^{2} (2.85 sq mi). Therefore, the number of medium- and high-rise residential areas is high relative to the population. The north side of the town faces the Gulf of Hibiki, and is with the borders of the Genkai Quasi-National Park.

=== Neighboring municipalities ===
Fukuoka Prefecture

- Kitakyūshū
- Mizumaki
- Okagaki
- Onga

=== Climate ===
Ashiya has a humid subtropical climate (Köppen Cfa) characterized by warm summers and cool winters with light to no snowfall. The average annual temperature in Ashiya is 16.0 °C. The average annual rainfall is 1715 mm with September as the wettest month. The temperatures are highest on average in August, at around 27.1 °C, and lowest in January, at around 5.7 °C.

=== Demographics ===
Per Japanese census data, the population of Ashiya is as shown below

Historical population
Year	Pop.	±%
1940	6,344	—
1950	10,930	+72.3%
1960	14,616	+33.7%
1970	17,366	+18.8%
1980	18,934	+9.0%
1990	17,398	−8.1%
2000	15,827	−9.0%
2010	15,367	−2.9%
2020	13,545	−11.9%

== History ==
The area of Ashiya was part of ancient Chikuzen Province. Shell middens left by the Jomon people are scattered around the midstream to the mouth of the ancient Onga River, and among these shell middens, one known as the Yamaga Shell Midden is particularly famous nationwide. In the late Yayoi period, the area was called "Oka no Tsu" and was famous as one of the three major military ports, along with Toyotsu and Usa. At that time, it was a deep and vast bay, but due to the accumulation of earth and sand from the Onga River over the years and land reclamation, there is no trace of what it once was. The name "Ashiya" appears in mid-Heian period documents. In 1185, it was the site of the Battle of Ashiyaura in the Genpei War. In the Kamakura period, the port was regards as equal to that of Shimonoseki. From the Edo period, it prospered as a post town on the highway to Karatsu and was under the control of Fukuoka Domain. After the Meiji restoration, the village of Ashiya was established on May 1, 1889, with the creation of the modern municipalities system. It was raised to town status on June 10, 1891. However, railway lines bypassed the area (due to its proximity to the Korean Peninsula and the Sea of Japan, construction was avoided from a defense perspective), and the area gradually became isolated.

== Government ==
Ashiya has a mayor-council form of government with a directly elected mayor and a unicameral town council of 12 members. Ashiya, collectively with the other municipalities of Onga District, contributes two members to the Fukuoka Prefectural Assembly. In terms of national politics, the town is part of the Fukuoka 8th district of the lower house of the Diet of Japan.

== Economy ==
Ashiya has developed as a commercial center around the military base, with some residual agriculture and commercial fishing. The town is increasingly a commuter town for neighboring Kitakyushu.

== Education ==
Ashiya has three public elementary schools and one public junior high school operated by the town government. The town does not have a high school.

== Transportation ==
=== Railways ===
Ashiya does not have any commercial railway services. The nearest train stations are Ongagawa or Mizumaki on the JR Kyushu Kagoshima Main Line.

=== Highways ===
- National Route 495
