= Shingū, Fukuoka =

Shingū 新宮町
- Town
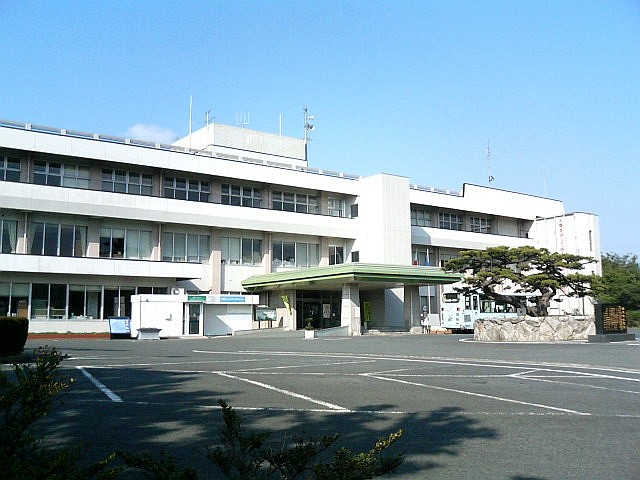
- Shingū Town Hall

- Flag Emblem
- Location of Shingū in Fukuoka Prefecture

- Location in Japan
- Coordinates: 33°42′55″N 130°26′48″E
- Country: Japan
- Region: Kyushu
- Prefecture: Fukuoka
- District: Kasuya

Area
  - Total: 18.93 km^{2} (7.31 sq mi)

Population (February 29, 2024)
  - Total: 33,142
  - Density: 1,751/km^{2} (4,534/sq mi)
- Time zone: UTC+09:00 (JST)
- Website: Official website
- Symbols
- Bird: Warbling white-eye
- Flower: Mikan flower
- Tree: Camphora officinarum, Pine

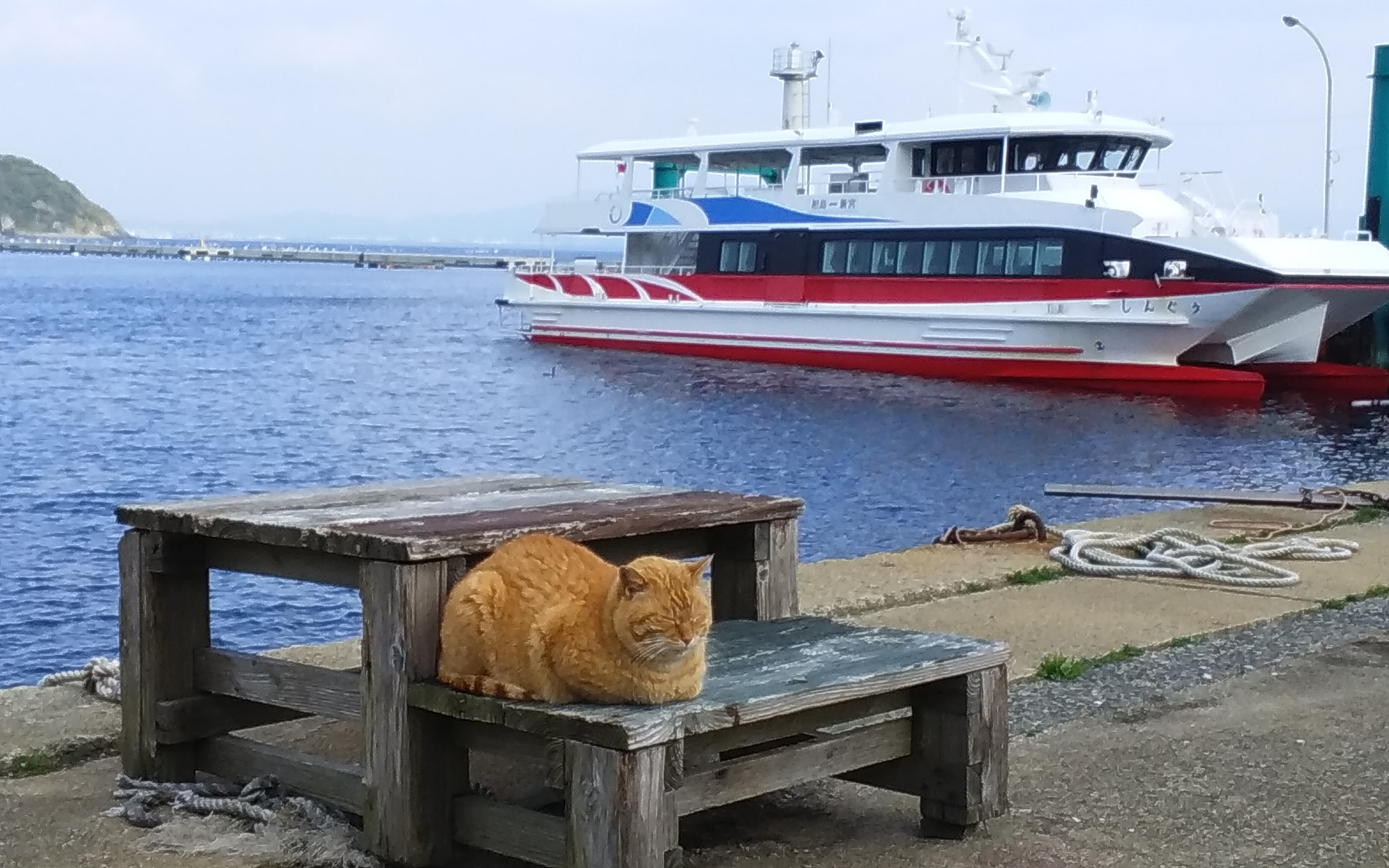
Ainoshima port

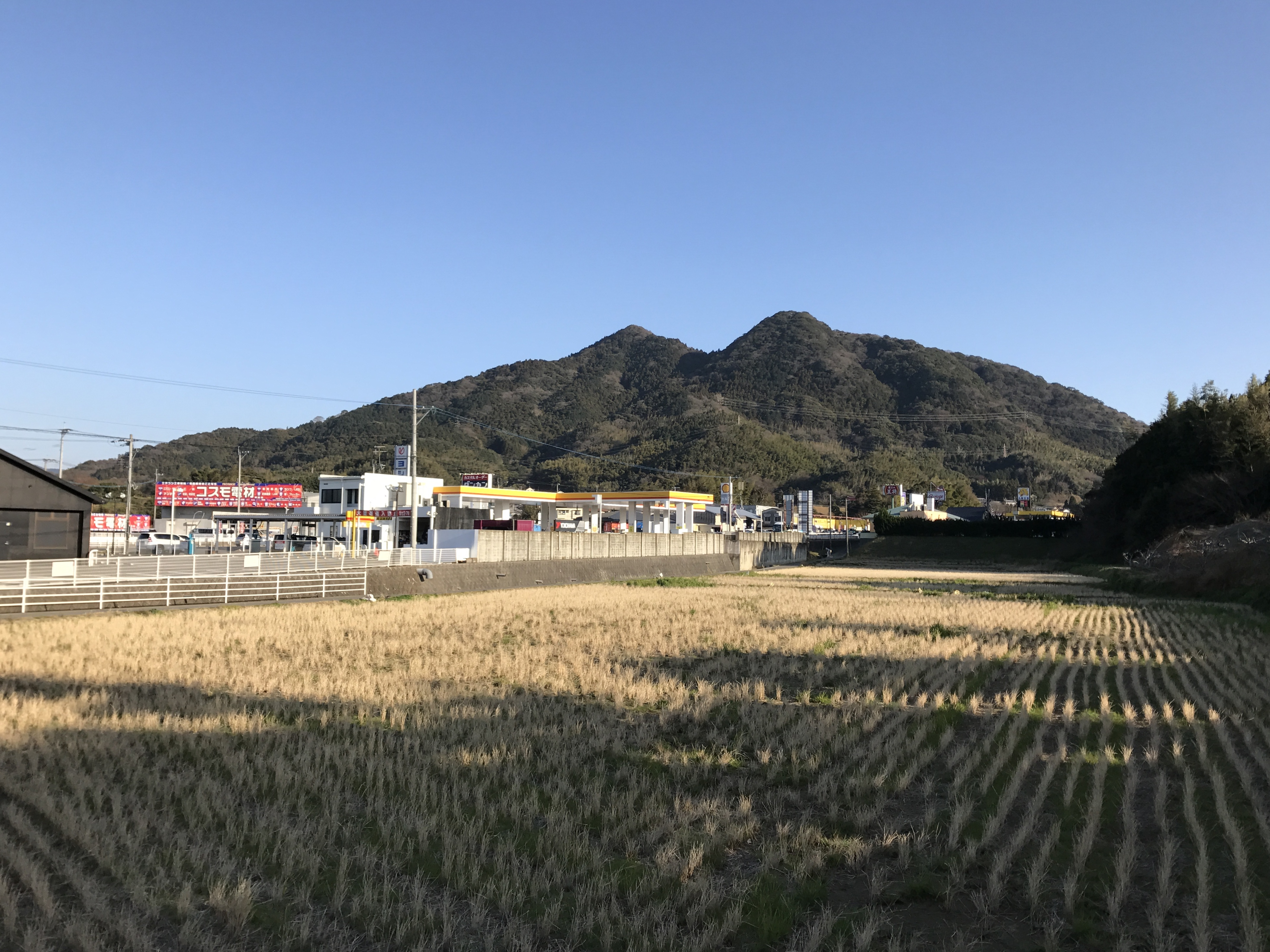
Mount Tachibana

Shingū (新宮町, Shingū-machi; Japanese pronunciation: [ɕiŋ.ɡɯꜜː, -ŋɯꜜː]) is a town located in Kasuya District, Fukuoka Prefecture. As of February 29, 2024, the town had an estimated population of 33,142 in 13664 households, and a population density of 1800 persons per km². The total area of the town is 18.93 km^{2} (7.31 sq mi), and includes the island Ainoshima.

== Geography ==
Shingū is located in northwestern Fukuoka Prefecture, adjacent to the eastern part of Fukuoka City. The northwestern part faces the Genkai Sea, and the coast is designated as part of Genkai Quasi-National Park. Ainoshima is located off the coast of the Genkai Sea. Mount Tachibana (367 meters) in the southeast is a prominent local landmark.

=== Neighboring municipalities ===
Fukuoka Prefecture

- Fukuoka
- Hisayama
- Koga

=== Climate ===
Shingū has a humid subtropical climate (Köppen Cfa) characterized by warm summers and cool winters with light to no snowfall. The average annual temperature in Shingū is 15.8 °C. The average annual rainfall is 1599 mm with September as the wettest month. The temperatures are highest on average in August, at around 26.2 °C, and lowest in January, at around 3.9 °C.

=== Demographics ===
Per Japanese census data, the population of Shingū is as shown below. Shingū has experienced very rapid growth in population in the 2010s due to the construction of large housing developments.

Historical population
Year	Pop.	±%
1940	5,715	—
1950	7,867	+37.7%
1960	8,420	+7.0%
1970	10,824	+28.6%
1980	13,863	+28.1%
1990	15,493	+11.8%
2000	22,431	+44.8%
2010	24,688	+10.1%
2020	32,927	+33.4%

== History ==
The area of Shingū was part of ancient Chikuzen Province. During the Sengoku period, it was the stronghold of the Tachibana clan, and during the Edo Period, the area was under the control of Fukuoka Domain. After the Meiji restoration, the village of Shingū was established with the creation of the modern municipalities system on April 1, 1889. It was raised to town status on November 1, 1954.

== Government ==
Shingū has a mayor-council form of government with a directly elected mayor and a unicameral town council of 12 members. Shingū, together with the other municipalities in Kasuya District contributes three members to the Fukuoka Prefectural Assembly. In terms of national politics, the city is part of the Fukuoka 4th district of the lower house of the Diet of Japan.

== Economy ==
The local economy is largely based on commercial fishing and commerce. An increasing percentage of the labor force commutes to neighboring Fukuoka for work.

== Education ==
Shingū has five public elementary schools and two public junior high schools operated by the town government, and one public high school operated by the Fukuoka Prefectural Board of Education.

== Transportation ==
=== Railways ===
JR Kyushu - Kagoshima Main Line

JA Shingū-Chūō

Nishitetsu Kaizuka Line

- Nishitetsu Shingū

=== Highways ===
- Kyushu Expressway
- National Route 3
- National Route 495

== Local attractions ==
- Tachibanayama Castle ruins
