= Chidori =

Chidori (千鳥, Japanese pronunciation: [tɕiꜜ.do.ɾʲi], transl. a plover; zigzaggy movements or patterns; a great many birds, lit. 'a thousand birds'), is the name of a number of characters and objects in Japanese traditional literature and drama. It may refer to:

== Anime and manga ==
- Chidori Kuruma (来間 千鳥), a character from the manga series Ceres, Celestial Legend
- Chidori Takashiro (高城 千鳥), a character from the Kiznaiver anime series
- Chidori Yoshino (吉野 千鳥), a character from Persona 3
- Chidori Ujimatsu (宇治松 千鳥), a character from the manga series Is the Order a Rabbit?
- Kaname Chidori (千鳥 かなめ), the female protagonist of Full Metal Panic!
- Kaname Chidori (千鳥 要), a character in Koi Kaze
- The character prototype in the Brave Witches anime television series
- A skill in the Naruto series
- A katana in Katana Maidens ~ Toji No Miko

== Other uses ==
- Chidori, a neighborhood in Ōta, Tokyo
- Chidori (comedy duo), Japanese comedy duo consisting of Daigo and Nobu as the members
- Chidori-class torpedo boat, an Imperial Japanese Navy class of torpedo boats that served during the Second World War
- Chidori Station, a train station on the Kagoshima Main Line in Koga, Fukuoka, Japan
- A famous sword wielded by the Sengoku Period samurai Tachibana Dōsetsu
