= Funabaru Kofun =

Burial mound in Fukuoka, Japan

- 船原古墳 (Japanese)
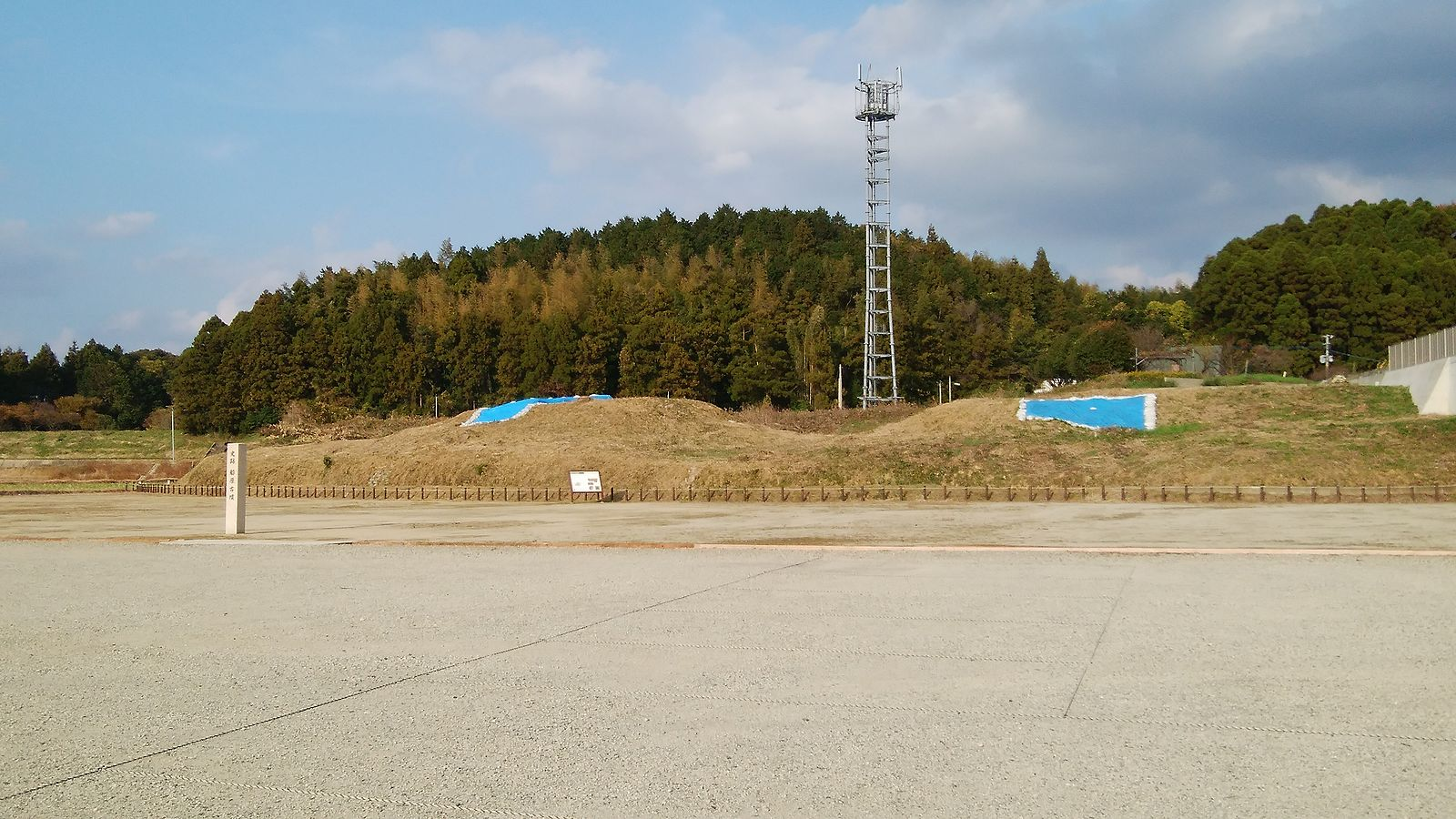
- Funabaru Kofun

- Funabaru Kofun Funabaru Kofun (Japan)
- 33°42′53″N 130°30′9″E
- Type: Kofun
- Periods: Kofun period
- Location: Koga, Fukuoka, Japan
- Region: Kyushu

History
- Built: c.6th century

Site notes
- Public access: Yes (no facilities)
- National Historic Site of Japan

The Funabaru Kofun (船原古墳) is a Kofun period burial mound, located in the Taniyama neighborhood of the city of Koga, Fukuoka Prefecture, Japan. The tumulus was designated a National Historic Site of Japan in 2016.

== Overview ==
The Funabaru Kofun was discovered in 1995 during land reclamation for farmland improvement. It is a zenpō-kōen-fun (前方後円墳), which is shaped like a keyhole, having one square end and one circular end, when viewed from above, and is estimated to have been constructed between the end of the 6th century and the beginning of the 7th century. The existing length is 37.4 meters, and the restored total length is estimated to be over 45 meters. It was excavated from 2012 to 2013. The burial chamber was a horizontal-entry stone chamber made of monoliths, with an anterior and posterior room. The site is noteworthy for its wealth of grave goods, which were unusually buried in pits outside the main tumulus. The No. 1 earthen pit, which has an inverted L-shape, contained over 500 items. These included the first chandelier-shaped gilt-bronze horse harness decorations found in Japan, including a cross-piece fitting with a green glass bead set in the center, and metal weapons, armor and agricultural tools. The luxury of the harness was comparable to the quality of the artifacts excavated from the Fujinoki Kofun in Nara Prefecture. After the excavation was completed, both the burial chamber was backfilled. In April 2018, a plaza and parking lot were built adjacent to the tumulus, and it is possible to visit the exterior.

The tumulus is approximately 4.7 kilometres southeast of Koga Station on the JR Kyushu Kagoshima Main Line (12 minutes by car).

== See also ==
- List of Historic Sites of Japan (Fukuoka)
