= Shishibu Station =

Railway station in Koga, Fukuoka Prefecture, Japan

JA 08 Shishibu Station ししぶ駅
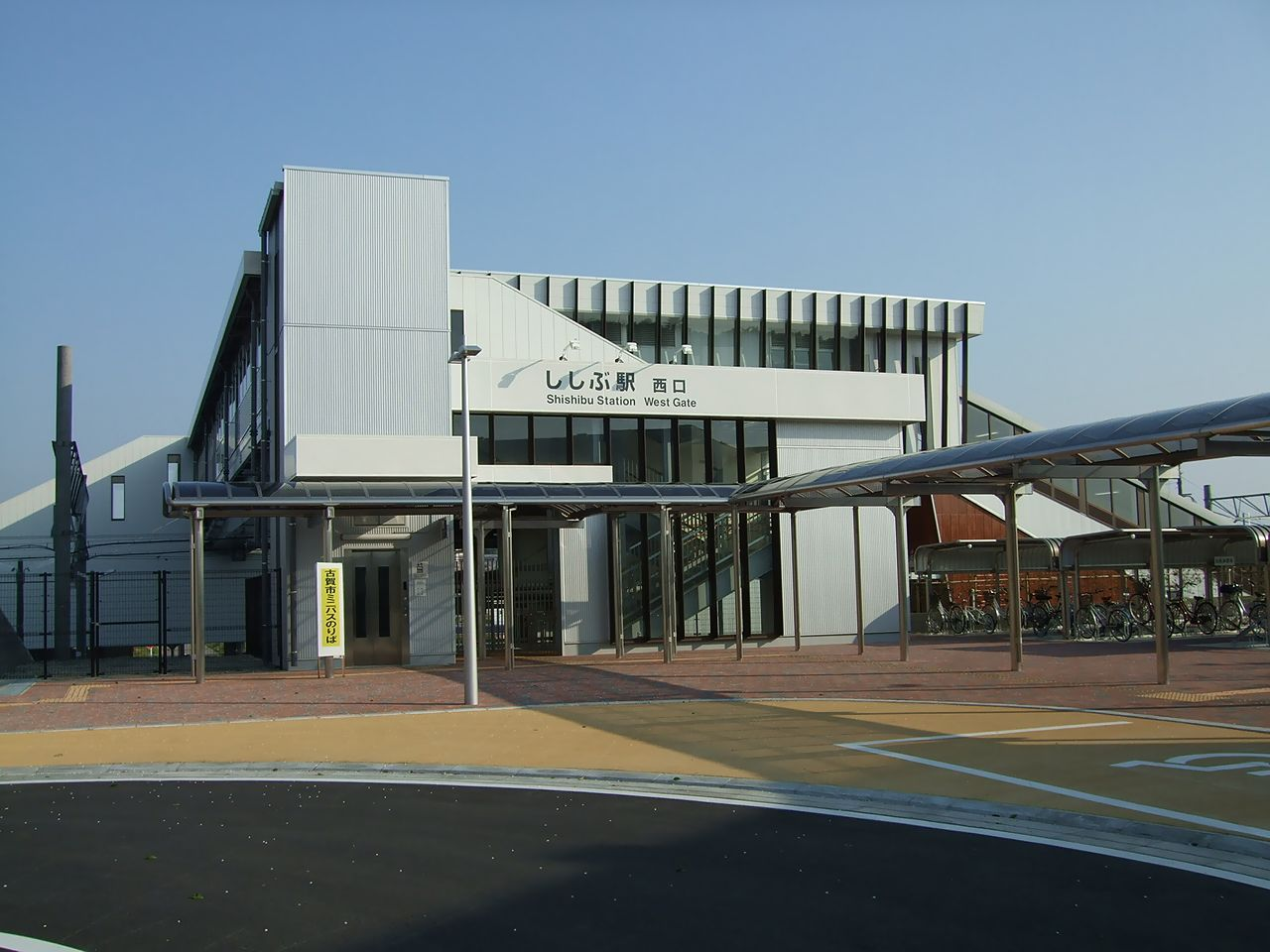
- Shishibu Station in 2009

General information
- Location: 2 Chome-28-1 Miake, Koga-shi, Fukuoka-ken 811-3107; Japan
- Coordinates: 33°43′18″N 130°27′30″E
- Operator: JR Kyushu
- Line: JA Kagoshima Main Line
- Distance: 62.0 km from Mojikō
- Platforms: 2 side platforms
- Tracks: 2

Construction
- Structure type: At grade

Other information
- Website: Official website

History
- Opened: 14 March 2009

Passengers
- FY2020: 1375 daily
- Rank: 105th (among JR Kyushu stations)

Services
Preceding station	JR Kyushu	Following station
Shingū-Chūō towards Kagoshima	Kagoshima Main Line	Koga towards Mojikō
Location
- Location within Fukuoka Prefecture Location within Japan

Shishibu Station (ししぶ駅, Shishibu-eki) is a passenger railway station located in the city of Koga, Fukuoka Prefecture, Japan. It is operated by JR Kyushu.

The name of the station was officially announced by JR Kyushu on September 24, 2008. Until then, the station was provisionally called Shishibu Station but was written in kanji as "鹿部駅".

== Lines ==
The station is served by the Kagoshima Main Line and is located 62.0 km from the starting point of the line at Mojikō.

== Layout ==
The station consists of two opposed side platforms serving two tracks, connected by an elevated station building. The station is staffed.

=== Platforms ===
1	■ JA Kagoshima Main Line	for Kurume, Tosu and Hakata
2	■ JA Kagoshima Main Line	for Orio and Kokura

== History ==
The station was opened by JR Kyushu on 14 March 2009 as an added station on the existing Kagoshima Main Line track.

== Passenger statistics ==
In fiscal 2020, the station was used by an average of 1375 passengers daily (boarding passengers only), and it ranked 105th among the busiest stations of JR Kyushu.

== Surrounding area ==
- Japan National Route 495
- Japan National Route 3
- Koga Industrial Park

== See also ==
- List of railway stations in Japan
