= Hideki Miyauchi =

Japanese politician

- 宮内 秀樹
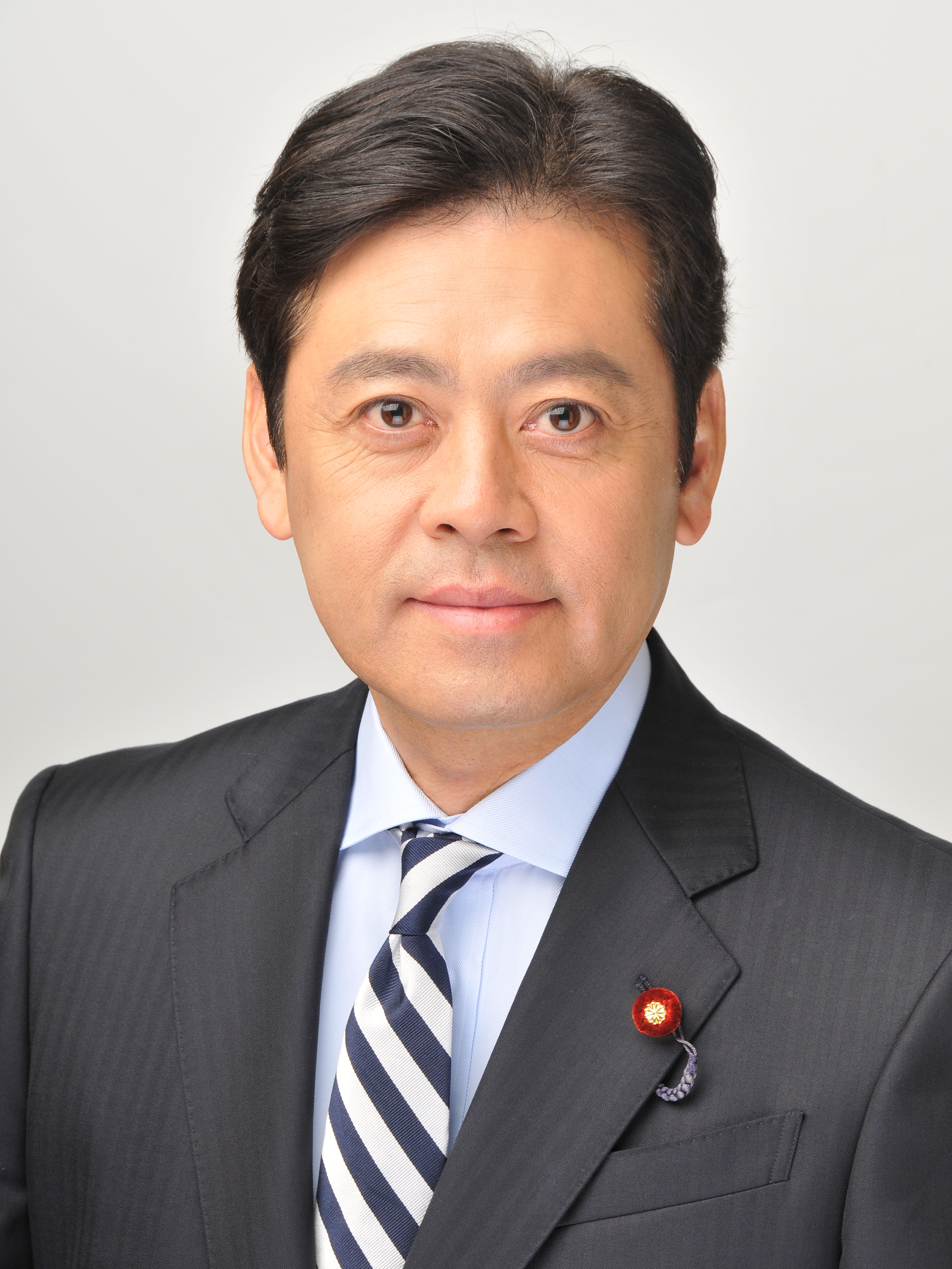
- Official portrait, 2016

Member of the House of Representatives
- Incumbent
- Assumed office 19 December 2012
- Preceded by: Takaaki Koga
- Constituency: Fukuoka 4th

Personal details
- Born: 19 October 1962 (age 63) Matsuyama, Ehime, Japan
- Party: Liberal Democratic
- Education: Aoyama Gakuin University

Hideki Miyauchi is a Japanese politician who is a member of the House of Representatives of Japan.

== Biography ==
He graduated from School of Business, Aoyama Gakuin University. He was elected in 2012 and re-elected in 2014, 2017, and 2021.
