= Shingū-Chūō Station =

Railway station in Shingū, Fukuoka Prefecture, Japan

JA 07 Shingū-Chūō Station 新宮中央駅
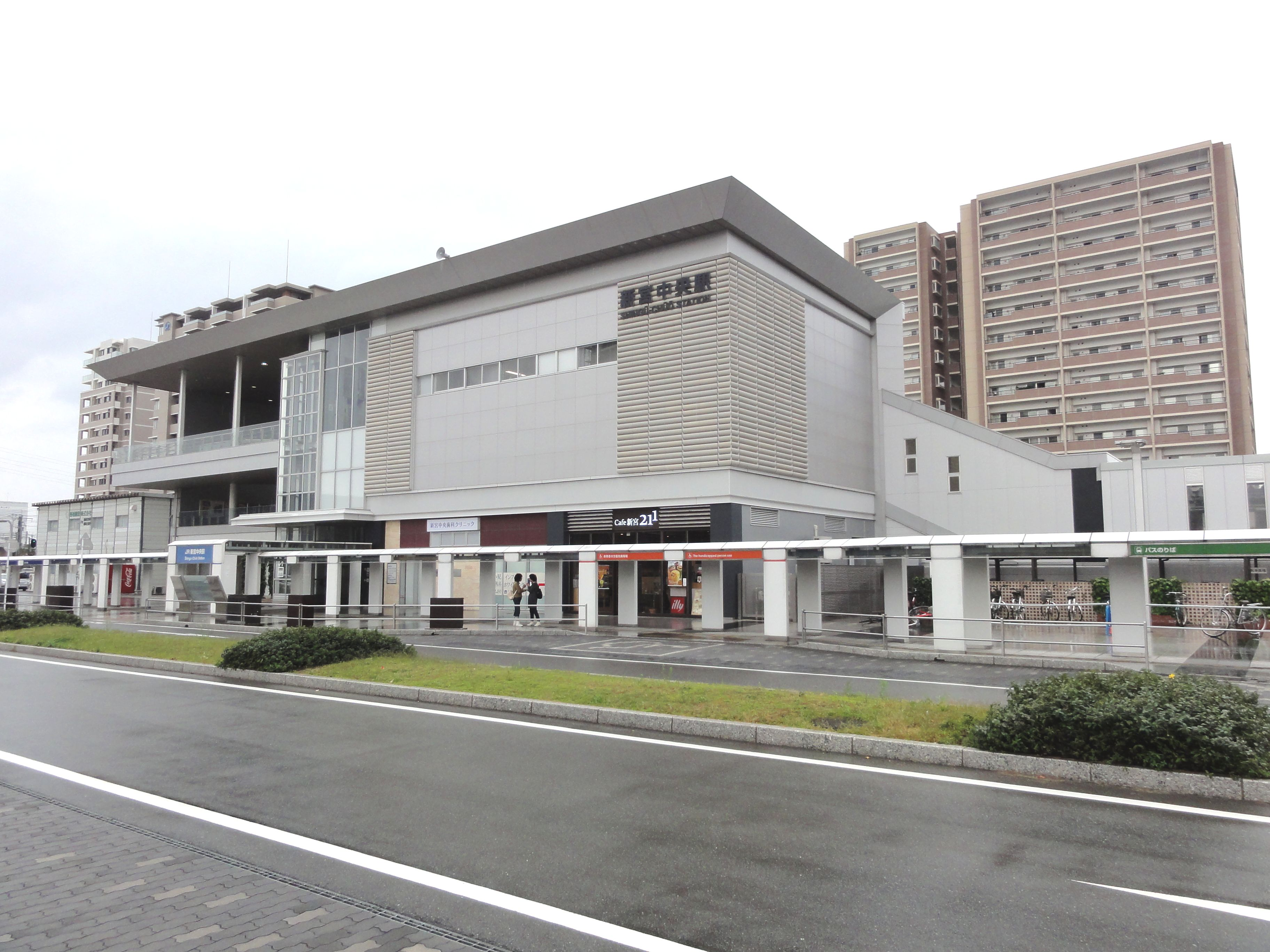
- Shingū-Chūō Station in 2014

General information
- Location: 2-chōme-1 Chūō Ekimae, Shingu-cho, Kasuya-gun, Fukuoka-ken 811-0120; Japan
- Coordinates: 33°42′42″N 130°26′57″E
- Operator: JR Kyushu
- Line: JA Kagoshima Main Line
- Distance: 63.4 km from Mojikō
- Platforms: 2 side platforms
- Tracks: 2

Construction
- Structure type: Elevated

Other information
- Status: Staffed (Midori no Madoguchi)
- Website: Official website

History
- Opened: 13 March 2010

Passengers
- FY2020: 4311
- Rank: 35th (among JR Kyushu stations)

Services
| Preceding station | JR Kyushu | Following station |
|---|---|---|
| Fukkōdaimae towards Kagoshima | Kagoshima Main Line | Shishibu towards Mojikō |
Location
- Location within Fukuoka Prefecture Location within Japan

Shingū-Chūō Station (新宮中央駅, Shingū-Chūō-eki) is a passenger railway station located in the town of Shingū, Fukuoka Prefecture, Japan. It is operated by JR Kyushu.

== Lines ==
The station is served by the Kagoshima Main Line and is located 63.4 km from the starting point of the line at Mojikō.

== Layout ==
The station consists of two opposed side platforms serving two tracks, connected by an elevated station building. The station has a Midori no Madoguchi staffed ticket office.

=== Platforms ===
| 1 | ■ JA Kagoshima Main Line | for Hakata and Kurume |
| 2 | ■ JA Kagoshima Main Line | for Orio and Kokura |

== History ==
The station was opened by JR Kyushu on 13 March 2010 as an added station on the existing Kagoshima Main Line track.

== Passenger statistics ==
In fiscal 2020, the station was used by an average of 4311 passengers daily (boarding passengers only), and it ranked 35th among the busiest stations of JR Kyushu.

== Surrounding area ==
The station is located in the northwestern part of Shingu Town. There are many commercial facilities on the east side, including IKEA immediately adjacent to the station, and there are many residences, factories, and offices on the west side, but large-scale condominiums are lined up on both the east and west sides.

== See also ==
- List of railway stations in Japan
