= Koga, Fukuoka =

Koga 古賀市
- City
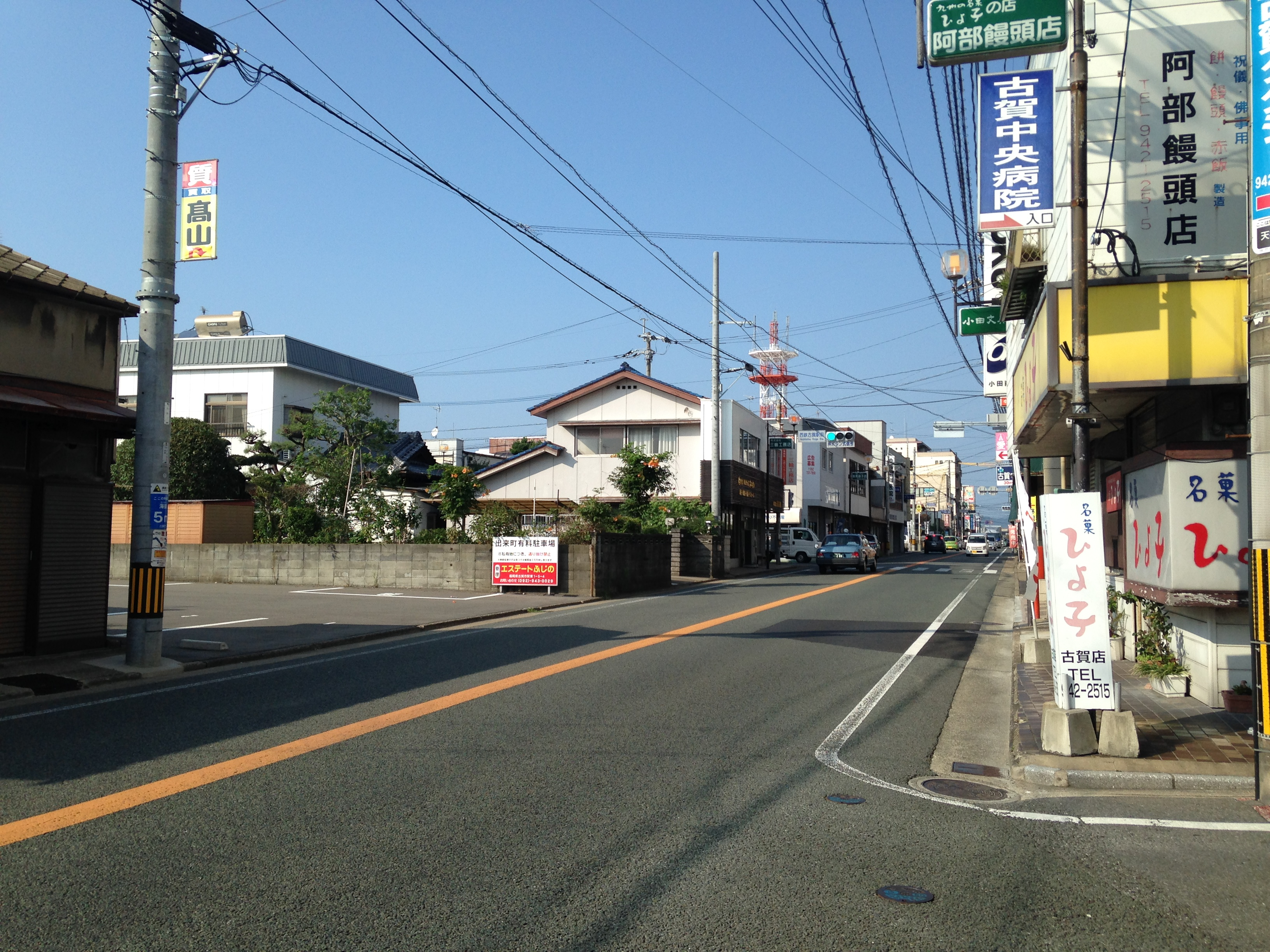
- Japan National Route 495 in Koga.

- Flag Emblem
- Interactive map of Koga
- Location in Japan
- Coordinates: 33°43′44″N 130°28′12″E
- Country: Japan
- Region: Kyushu
- Prefecture: Fukuoka

Area
  - Total: 42.07 km^{2} (16.24 sq mi)

Population (February 29, 2024)
  - Total: 59,282
  - Density: 1,409/km^{2} (3,650/sq mi)
- Time zone: UTC+09:00 (JST)
- City hall address: 1-1-1 Ekihigashi, Koga-shi, Fukuoka-ken 811-3102
- Website: Official website
- Symbols
- Flower: Cosmos
- Tree: Ilex rotunda

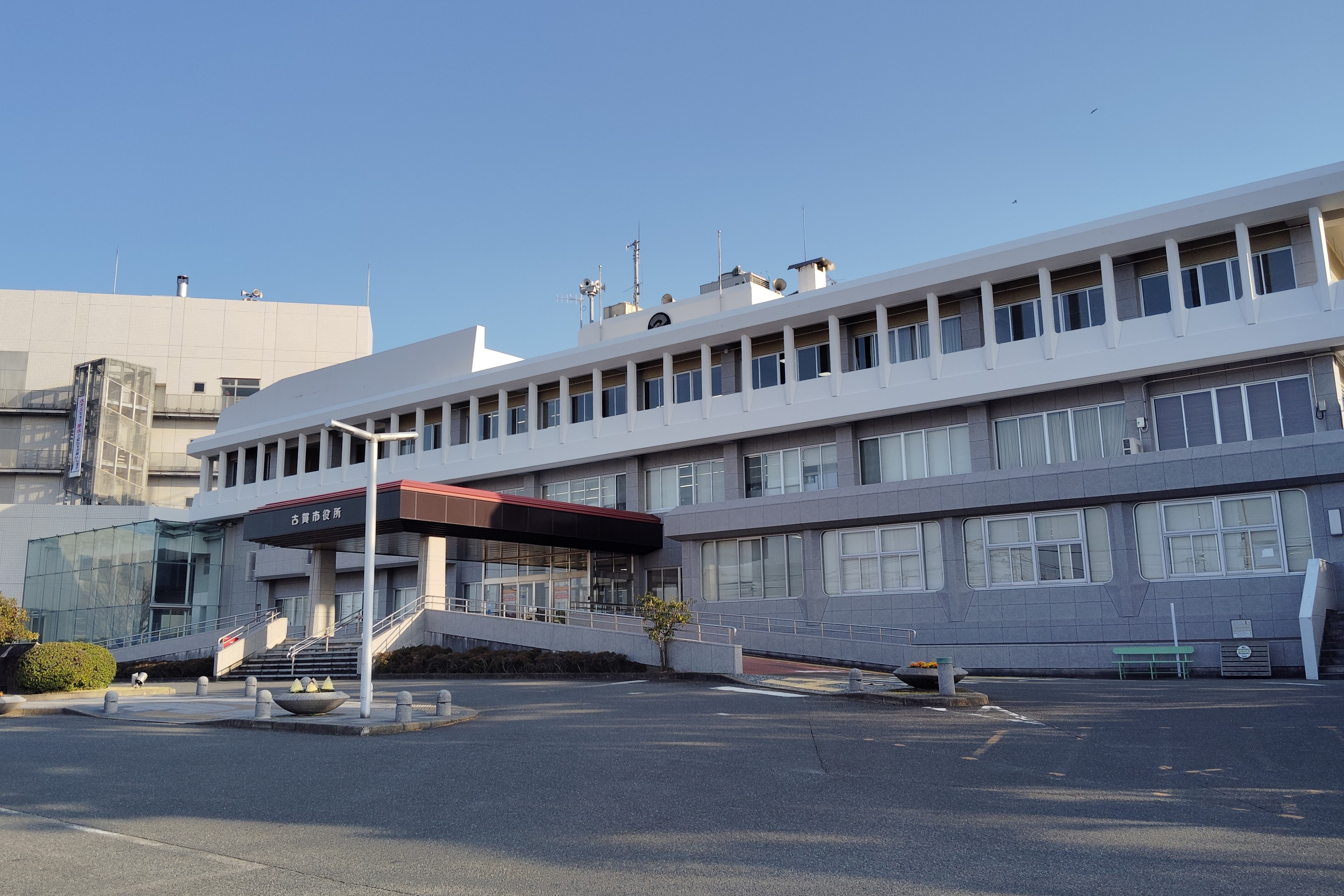
Koga City Hall

Koga (古賀市, Koga-shi) is a city located in Fukuoka Prefecture, Japan. As of 29 February 2024, the city had an estimated population of 59,282 in 26981 households, and a population density of 1400 persons per km². The total area of the city is 42.07 km^{2} (16.24 sq mi).

== Geography ==
Koga is located in northern Fukuoka Prefecture, approximately 15 kilometers northeast of Fukuoka City and approximately 15 kilometers southwest of Munakata City. It belongs to the commuting area of the Fukuoka metropolitan area and has been steadily growing in population as a commuter town. The city faces the Genkai Sea to the west, and is a sand dune area with pine fields. There are hilly areas in the north and south, bordering Fukutsu and Shingu, respectively. To the east lies the Inunaki Mountains, which extend from the Mikori Mountains. The Daikon River (Hanazuru River) flows from the mountains into the center of the town. A small flatland is formed by the deposits and alluvial fan of the Daikon River and the adjacent Nakagawa River. The center of the area is the Tenjin area, but there have been concerns about its hollowing out in recent years. Parts of the city are within the borders of the Genkai Quasi-National Park.

=== Neighboring municipalities ===
Fukuoka Prefecture

- Fukutsu
- Hisayama
- Miyawaka
- Shingū

=== Climate ===
Koga has a humid subtropical climate (Köppen Cfa) characterized by warm summers and cool winters with light to no snowfall. The average annual temperature in Koga is 15.7 °C. The average annual rainfall is 1599 mm with September as the wettest month.

=== Demographics ===
Per Japanese census data, the population of Koga is as shown below

Historical population
Year	Pop.	±%
1940	10,625	—
1950	16,383	+54.2%
1960	18,877	+15.2%
1970	25,195	+33.5%
1980	35,562	+41.1%
1990	45,725	+28.6%
2000	55,476	+21.3%
2010	57,930	+4.4%
2020	59,658	+3.0%

== History ==
The area of Koga was part of ancient Chikugo Province. During the Edo Period the area was under the control of Fukuoka Domain. After the Meiji restoration, the villages of Ogōri and Aoyagi were established on May 1, 1889 with the creation of the modern municipalities system. The villages merged to form the town of Koga on April 1, 1955. Koga was raised to city status on October 1, 1997.

== Government ==
Koga has a mayor-council form of government with a directly elected mayor and a unicameral city council of 19 members. Koga contributes one member to the Fukuoka Prefectural Assembly. In terms of national politics, the city is part of the Fukuoka 4th district of the lower house of the Diet of Japan.

== Economy ==
Koga has a mixed economy centering on agriculture and light manufacturing and food processing. An increasing percentage of the working population commutes to nearby Fukuoka City for work.

== Education ==
Koga has eight public elementary schools and three public junior high schools operated by the city government and two public high schools operated by the Fukuoka Prefectural Board of Education. The Fukuoka Jogakuin Nursing University is located in Koga.

== Transportation ==
=== Railways ===
JR Kyushu - Kagoshima Main Line

JA Chidori - Koga - Shishibu

=== Highways ===
- Kyushu Expressway
- National Route 3
- National Route 495

== Local attractions ==
- Funabaru Kofun, National Historic Site

== Notable people from Koga ==
- Hiromu Shinozuka, manga artist
- Yui, singer-songwriter and multi-instrumentalist
