= Onga, Fukuoka =

Onga 遠賀町
- Town
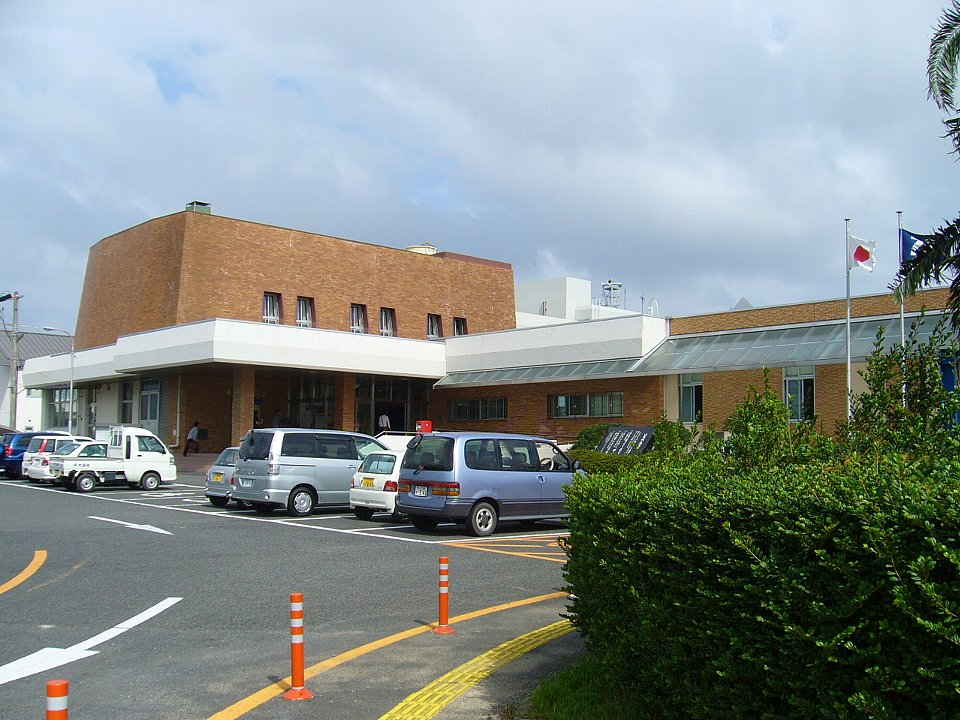
- Onga Town hall

- Flag Emblem
- Location of Onga in Fukuoka Prefecture

- Location in Japan
- Coordinates: 33°50′52″N 130°40′06″E
- Country: Japan
- Region: Kyushu
- Prefecture: Fukuoka
- District: Onga

Area
  - Total: 22.15 km^{2} (8.55 sq mi)

Population (February 29, 2024)
  - Total: 18,970
  - Density: 856.4/km^{2} (2,218/sq mi)
- Time zone: UTC+09:00 (JST)
- City hall address: 513 Konkoga, Onga-machi, Onga-gun, Fukuoka-ken 811-4303
- Website: Official website
- Symbols
- Flower: Narcissus
- Tree: Osmanthus fragrans

Onga (遠賀町, Onga-chō) is a town located in Onga District, Fukuoka Prefecture, Japan. As of 29 February 2024, the town had an estimated population of 18,970 in 8712 households, and a population density of 860 persons per km^{2}. The total area of the town is 11.01 km^{2} (4.25 sq mi).

== Geography ==
Onga is located in north-central Fukuoka Prefecture, approximately halfway between Kitakyūshū City and Fukuoka City. The Onga River flows through the eastern edge of the town.

=== Neighboring municipalities ===
Fukuoka Prefecture

- Ashiya
- Kurate
- Mizumaki
- Munakata
- Nakama
- Okagaki

=== Climate ===
Onga has a humid subtropical climate (Köppen Cfa) characterized by warm summers and cool winters with light to no snowfall. The average annual temperature in Onga is 15.6 °C. The average annual rainfall is 1560 mm with September as the wettest month. The temperatures are highest on average in August, at around 26.8 °C, and lowest in January, at around 5.0 °C.

=== Demographics ===
Per Japanese census data, the population of Onga is as shown below

Historical population
Year	Pop.	±%
1940	9,553	—
1950	10,181	+6.6%
1960	9,505	−6.6%
1970	9,368	−1.4%
1980	14,188	+51.5%
1990	17,107	+20.6%
2000	19,309	+12.9%
2010	19,163	−0.8%
2020	18,723	−2.3%

== History ==
The area of Onga was part of ancient Chikuzen Province. About 3000 years ago, the large Ko-Onga Bay covered the area where the town of Ong now lies. Soil and silt carried by the Onga River gradually built up until a flat plain was built up in the area. People began living and planting rice crops on that ground. Terrible floods continually plagued the area. During the Edo Period the area was under the control of Fukuoka Domain. After the Meiji restoration, the villages of Shimamon and Asaki were established on May 1, 1889 with the creation of the modern municipalities system. The villages merged on April 1, 1929 to form the village of Onga, which was raised to town status on February 1, 1964.

== Government ==
Onga has a mayor-council form of government with a directly elected mayor and a unicameral town council of 13 members. Onga, collectively with the other municipalities of Onga District, contributes two members to the Fukuoka Prefectural Assembly. In terms of national politics, the town is part of the Fukuoka 8th district of the lower house of the Diet of Japan.

== Economy ==
Agriculture, notably the production of rice, forms the backbone of the local economy. Due to its proximity to the two large urban centers of Fukuoka and Kitakyushu, the town is increasingly a commuter town with a substantial portion of its working labor force commuting daily to either city.

== Education ==
Onga has three public elementary schools and two public junior high schools operated by the town government, and one public high school operated by the Fukuoka Prefectural Board of Education.

== Transportation ==
=== Railways ===
JR Kyushu - Kagoshima Main Line

JA Ongagawa

=== Highways ===
- National Route 3
- National Route 495

== Notable people from Onga ==
- Asahiko Mihara, politician
- Mika Iwata, is a Japanese professional wrestler
