= Fukuma, Fukuoka =

Dissolved municipality in Fukuoka prefecture, Japan

Fukuma (福間町, Fukuma-machi) was a town located in Munakata District, Fukuoka Prefecture, Japan.

As of 2003, the town had an estimated population of 41,719 and a density of 1,417.57 persons per km^{2}. The total area was 29.43 km^{2}.

On January 24, 2005, Fukuma, along with the town of Tsuyazaki (also from Munakata District), was merged to create the city of Fukutsu.
