= Miyajidake Shrine =

Shinto shrine in Fukuoka Prefecture, Japan

Miyajidake-jinja 宮地嶽神社
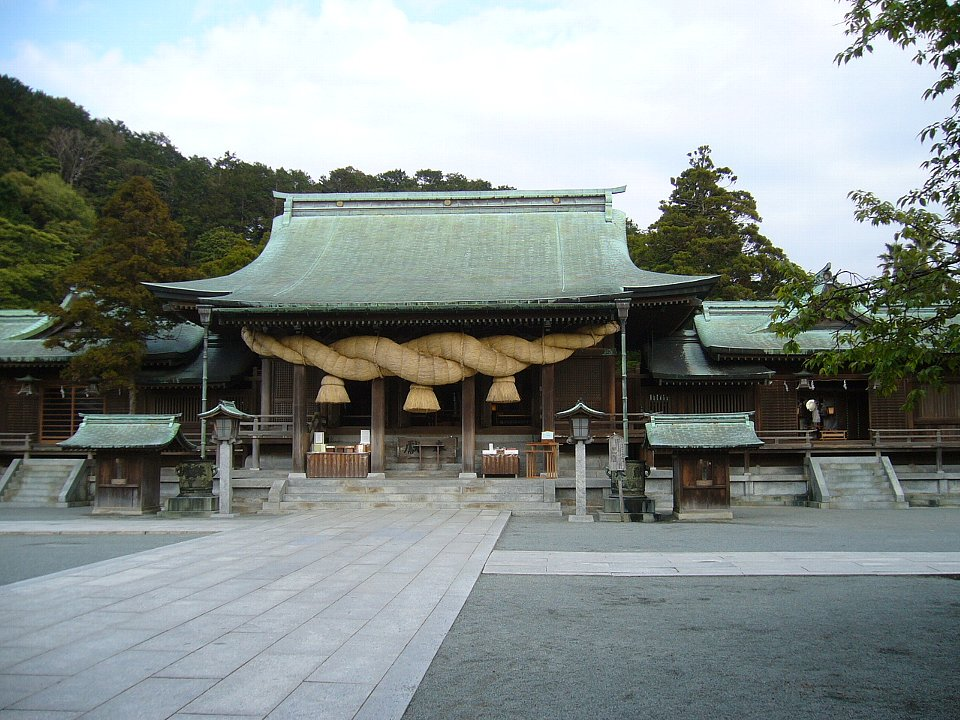

- Location within Japan

Religion
- Affiliation: Shinto
- Deity: Empress Jingū

Location
- Location: 7-1, Miyaji Motomachi, Fukutsu; Fukuoka 811-3309
- Coordinates: 33°46′47″N 130°29′10″E

Architecture
- Established: C.400 AD

Website
- www.miyajidake.or.jp

Miyajidake Shrine (宮地嶽神社, Miyajidake-jinja) is a Shinto shrine located in Fukutsu, Fukuoka, Japan. It is dedicated to Empress Jingū

== See also ==
- List of Shinto shrines
