= Okagaki, Fukuoka =

Okagaki 岡垣町
- Town
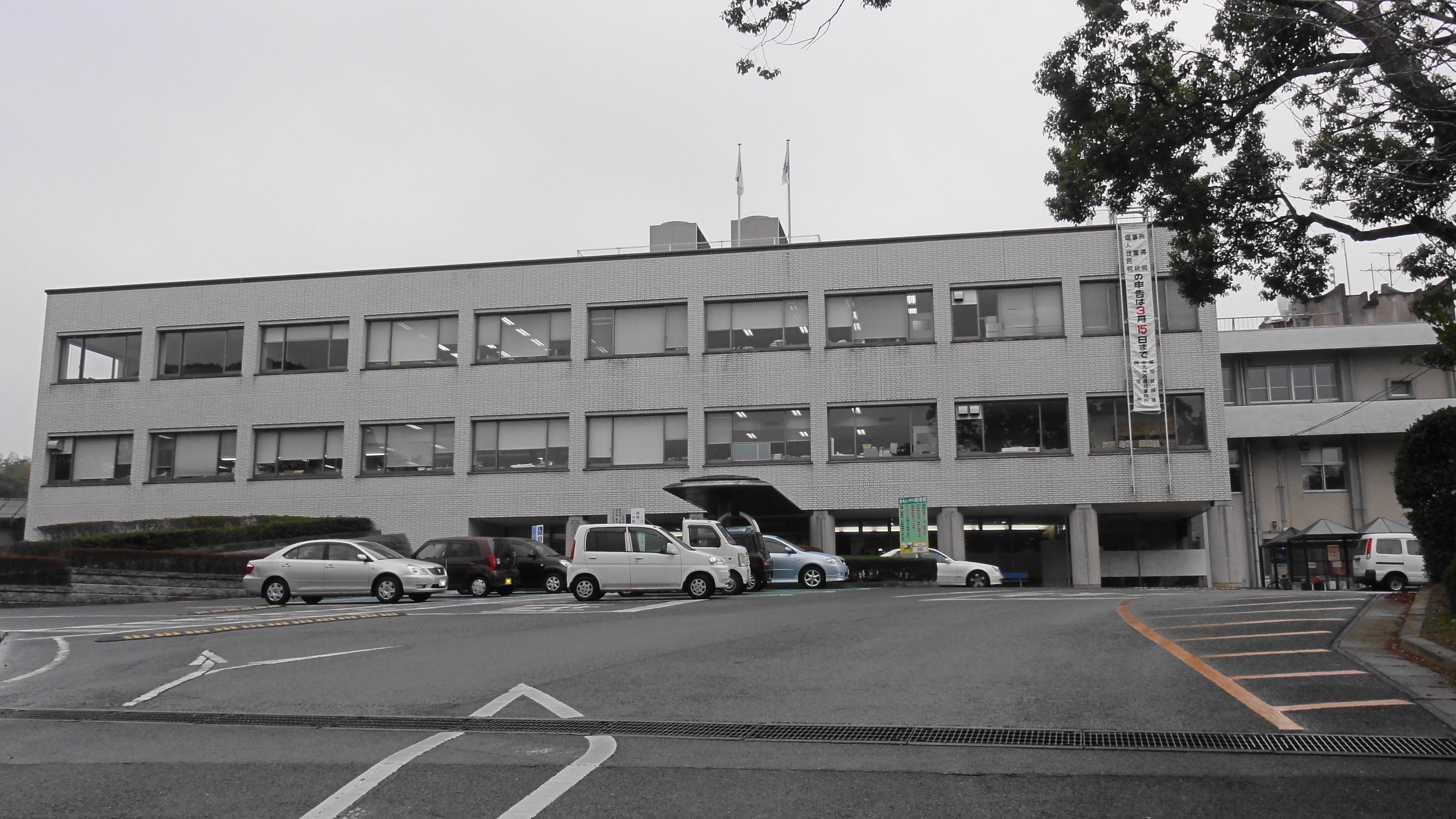
- Okagaki Town Hall

- Flag Chapter
- Location of Okagaki in Fukuoka Prefecture

- Location in Japan
- Coordinates: 33°51′13″N 130°36′40″E
- Country: Japan
- Region: Kyushu
- Prefecture: Fukuoka
- District: Onga

Area
  - Total: 48.64 km^{2} (18.78 sq mi)

Population (December 31, 2023)
  - Total: 31,553
  - Density: 648.7/km^{2} (1,680/sq mi)
- Time zone: UTC+09:00 (JST)
- City hall address: 1-1-1 Noma, Okagaki-cho, Onga-gun, Fukuoka-ken 811-4233
- Website: Official website
- Symbols
- Bird: Common Kingfisher
- Flower: Azalea
- Tree: Cinnamomum camphora

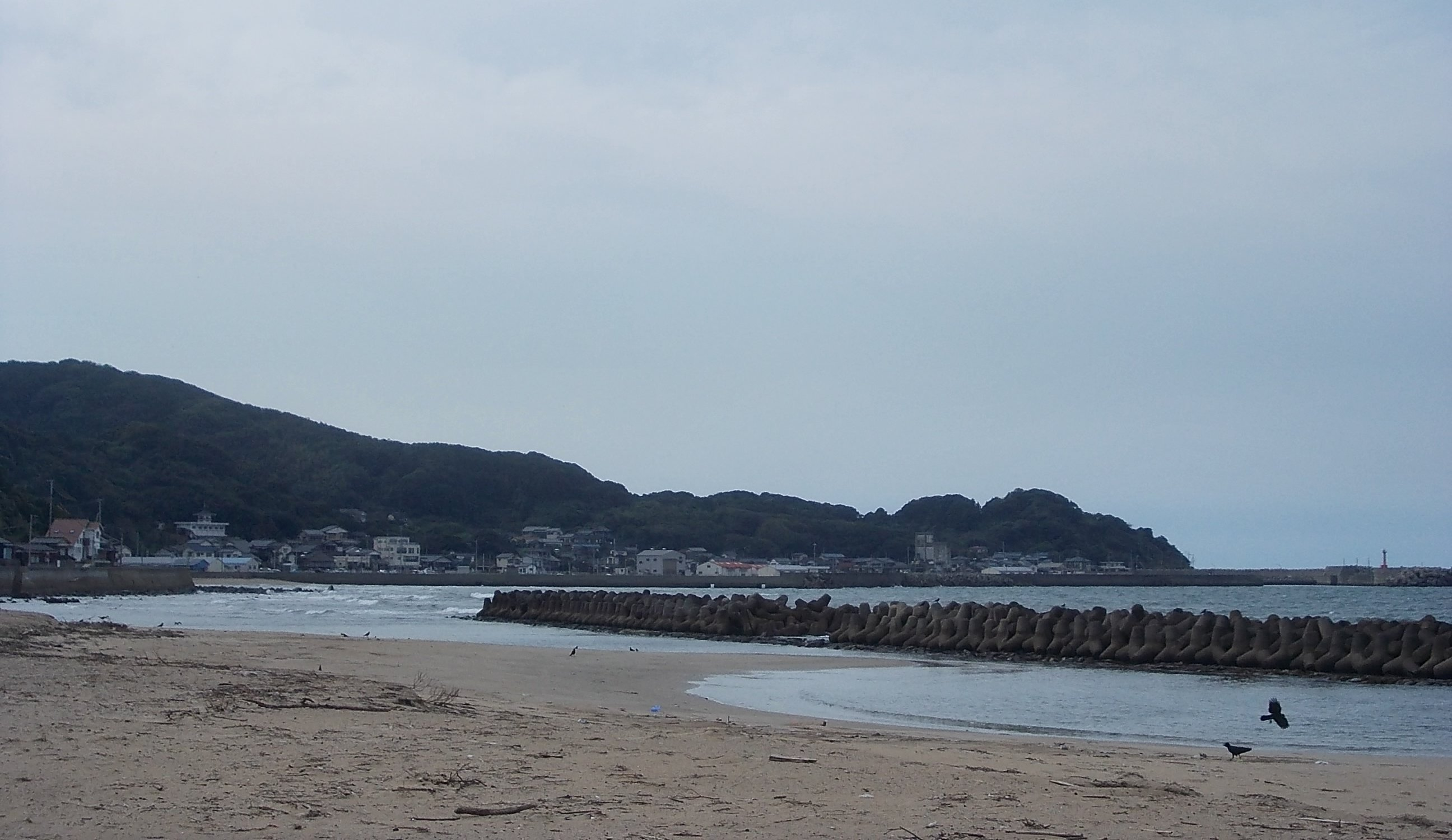
Hatsu fishing harbor

Okagaki (岡垣町, Okagaki-machi) is a town located in Onga District, Fukuoka Prefecture, Japan. As of 31 December 2023, the town had an estimated population of 31,553 in 14376 households, and a population density of 490 persons per km^{2}. The total area of the town is 48.64 km^{2} (18.78 sq mi).

== Geography ==
Okagaki is located in the northern part of Fukuoka Prefecture, approximately 30 kilometers west of Kitakyushu and approximately 40 kilometers northeast of Fukuoka City. The northern part of the town faces the Gulf of Hibiki, and in the western part of the town, on the border with Munakata City, there is a series of mountains with heights of 300 to 400 meters called the Munakata Yotsuzuka.

=== Neighboring municipalities ===
Fukuoka Prefecture

- Ashiya
- Munakata
- Onga

=== Climate ===
Onga has a humid subtropical climate (Köppen Cfa) characterized by warm summers and cool winters with light to no snowfall. The average annual temperature in Onga is 15.6 °C. The average annual rainfall is 1560 mm with September as the wettest month. The temperatures are highest on average in August, at around 26.8 °C, and lowest in January, at around 5.0 °C.

=== Demographics ===
Per Japanese census data, the population of Okagaki is as shown below

Historical population
Year	Pop.	±%
1950	11,635	—
1960	14,339	+23.2%
1970	13,417	−6.4%
1980	16,760	+24.9%
1970	25,327	+51.1%
1990	27,896	+10.1%
2000	30,417	+9.0%
2010	32,101	+5.5%
2020	31,648	−1.4%

== History ==
The area of Okagaki was part of ancient Chikuzen Province. During the Edo Period, the area was under the control of Fukuoka Domain. After the Meiji restoration, the villages of Okaken and Yahagi were established with the creation of the modern municipalities system on April 1, 1889. The two villages had many similarities in geography and customs, and had also worked together to attract a railway station (which culminated in Ebitsu Station in 1910), increasing the momentum for a merger, and in 1907, the two villages merged. Okagaki was raised to town status on October 1, 1962.

== Government ==
Okagaki has a mayor-council form of government with a directly elected mayor and a unicameral town council of 13 members. Okagaki, collectively with the other municipalities in the Onga District, contributes two members to the Fukuoka Prefectural Assembly. In terms of national politics, the town is part of the Fukuoka 8th district of the lower house of the Diet of Japan.

== Economy ==
Okagaki is largely a commercial center and commuter town for nearby Kitakyushu and Fukuoka. In terms of agriculture, the town is known within the region for its production of the loquat fruit.

== Education ==
Okagaki has five public elementary schools and two public junior high school by the town government. The town does not have a high school.

== Transportation ==
=== Railways ===
JR Kyushu - Kagoshima Main Line

JA Ebitsu

=== Highways ===
- National Route 3
- National Route 495
