= Fukuoka 4th district =

Parliamentary constituency in Fukuoka Prefecture, Japan

- Parliamentary constituency for the Japanese House of Representatives
- Numbered map of the Fukuoka Prefecture single seats
- Prefecture: Fukuoka
- Proportional District: Kyushu
- Electorate: 397,301

Current constituency
- Created: 1994
- Seats: One
- Party: LDP
- Representatives: Hideki Miyauchi
- Municipalities: Part of Higashi-ku of Fukuoka city. Cities Fukutsu, Koga, and Munakata. District of Kasuya

Fukuoka 4th district (福岡県第4区, Fukuoka-ken dai-yonku or simply 福岡4区, Fukuoka-yonku) is a single-member constituency of the House of Representatives in the national Diet of Japan located in Fukuoka Prefecture.

== Areas covered ==
=== Since 2022 ===
- Part of Fukuoka city
  - Part of Higashi-ku
- Fukutsu
- Koga
- Munakata
- Kasuya District

=== 2013 - 2022 ===
- Fukutsu
- Koga
- Munakata
- Kasuya District

=== 2002 - 2013 ===
- Koga
- Munakata
- Kasuya District
- Munakata District

=== 1994 - 2002 ===
- Munakata
- Kasuya District
- Munakata District

== List of representatives ==
Election	Representative	Party	Notes
1996	Tomoyoshi Watanabe	LDP	
2000	Tomoyoshi Watanabe	LDP	
2003	Tomoyoshi Watanabe	LDP	
2005	Tomoyoshi Watanabe	LDP	
2009	Takaaki Koga	Democratic	
2009	Takaaki Koga	PLF	
2009	Takaaki Koga	Tomorrow	
2012	Hideki Miyauchi	LDP	
2014	Hideki Miyauchi	LDP	
2017	Hideki Miyauchi	LDP	
2021	Hideki Miyauchi	LDP	
2024	Hideki Miyauchi	LDP	
2026	Hideki Miyauchi	LDP	

== Election results ==
=== 2026 ===
2026
Party	Candidate	Votes	%	±%
LDP	Hideki Miyauchi (Incumbent)	110,544	53.6	▲20.03
DPP	Ryotaro Konomi (Won PR seat)	63,519	30.8	▲10.85
Sanseitō	Yuichi Harada	32,082	15.6	▲10.01
Majority		47,025	22.8	▲9.18
Registered electors		397,424		
Turnout		206,145	55.35	▲1.87
LDP hold				

=== 2024 ===
2024
Party	Candidate	Votes	%	±%
LDP	Hideki Miyauchi (Incumbent)	68,585	33.57	▼15.85
DPP	Ryotaro Konomi (Won PR seat)	40,753	19.95	New
Ishin	Hiroki Abe (Won PR seat)	34,572	16.92	▼2.12
Independent	Motoaki Yoshimatsu	28,915	14.15	New
Social Democratic	Akiko Sō	20,051	9.82	▲3.98
Sanseitō	Yoshihiro Yukihira	11,401	5.59	New
Majority		27,832	13.62	
Registered electors		396,139		
Turnout			53.48	▼0.49
LDP hold				

=== 2021 ===
2021
Party	Candidate	Votes	%	±%
LDP	Hideki Miyauchi (Incumbent)	96,023	49.42	▼6.14
CDP	Shintaro Morimoto	49,935	25.70	New
Ishin	Hiroki Abe (Won PR seat)	36,998	19.04	▼8.24
Social Democratic	Nobuaki Takeuchi	11,338	5.84	New
Majority		46,088	23.72	
Registered electors		369,215		
Turnout			53.97	▼0.13
LDP hold				

=== 2017 ===
2017
Party	Candidate	Votes	%	±%
LDP	Hideki Miyauchi (Incumbent)	104,726	55.56	▲1.64
Ishin	Masami Kawano	51,426	27.28	New
JCP	Kiyotaka Shindome	32,340	17.16	▲3.39
Majority		53,300	28.28	
Registered electors		361,451		
Turnout			54.10	▲3.49
LDP hold				

=== 2014 ===
2014
Party	Candidate	Votes	%	±%
LDP	Hideki Miyauchi (Incumbent)	91,222	53.92	▲9.23
Innovation	Masami Kawano (Won PR seat)	54,663	32.31	New
JCP	Kiyotaka Shindome	23,285	13.77	▲7.56
Majority		36,559	21.61	
Registered electors		347,219		
Turnout			50.61	▼7.47
LDP hold				

=== 2012 ===
2012
Party	Candidate	Votes	%	±%
LDP	Hideki Miyauchi	86,039	44.69	▼1.24
Restoration	Masami Kawano (Won PR seat)	42,319	21.98	New
Democratic	Yoshinari Kishimoto	31,432	16.33	▼35.39
Tomorrow	Takaaki Koga (Incumbent)	17,237	8.95	New
JCP	Kiyotaka Shindome	11,946	6.21	N/A
Happiness Realization	Kazue Yoshitomi	3,543	1.84	▼0.51
Majority		43,720	22.71	
Registered electors				
Turnout			58.08	
LDP gain from Tomorrow				

=== 2009 ===
2009
Party	Candidate	Votes	%	±%
Democratic	Takaaki Koga	119,500	51.72	▲12.03
LDP	Tomoyoshi Watanabe (Incumbent)	106,124	45.93	▼7.18
Happiness Realization	Kōji Suzuki	5,437	2.35	New
Majority		13,376	5.79	
Registered electors				
Turnout				
Democratic gain from LDP				

=== 2005 ===
2005
Party	Candidate	Votes	%	±%
LDP	Tomoyoshi Watanabe (Incumbent)	114,613	53.11	▲2.30
Democratic	Kinya Narasaki	85,658	39.69	▼2.73
JCP	Kiyotaka Shindome	15,542	7.20	▲0.43
Majority		28,955	13.42	
Registered electors				
Turnout				
LDP hold				

=== 2003 ===
2003
Party	Candidate	Votes	%	±%
LDP	Tomoyoshi Watanabe (Incumbent)	95,469	50.81	▲3.42
Democratic	Kinya Narasaki (Won PR seat)	79,712	42.42	▲0.02
JCP	Kiyotaka Shindome	12,713	6.77	▼3.44
Majority		15,757	8.39	
Registered electors				
Turnout				
LDP hold				

=== 2000 ===
2000
Party	Candidate	Votes	%	±%
LDP	Tomoyoshi Watanabe (Incumbent)	87,327	47.39	▼3.05
Democratic	Kinya Narasaki (Won PR seat)	78,128	42.40	New
JCP	Torahiko Matsuo	18,802	10.21	▼0.96
Majority		9,199	4.99	
Registered electors				
Turnout				
LDP hold				

=== 1996 ===
1996
Party	Candidate	Votes	%	±%
LDP	Tomoyoshi Watanabe	86,765	50.44	New
New Frontier	Junji Higashi	62,051	36.07	New
JCP	Teruo Yoshida	19,211	11.17	New
Liberal League	Takashi Hatae	3,984	2.32	New
Majority		24,714	14.37	
Registered electors				
Turnout				
LDP win (new seat)				
