= Tsuyazaki, Fukuoka =

Dissolved municipality in Fukuoka prefecture, Japan

Tsuyazaki (津屋崎町, Tsuyazaki-machi) was a town located in Munakata District, Fukuoka Prefecture, Japan.

As of 2003, the town had an estimated population of 14,362 and a density of 616.92 persons per km^{2}. The total area was 23.28 km^{2}.

On January 24, 2005, Tsuyazaki, along with the town of Fukuma (also from Munakata District), was merged to create the city of Fukutsu.
