= Tomoyoshi Watanabe =

Japanese politician (born 1941)

- 渡辺 具能
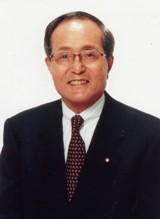
- Official portrait, 2006

Member of the House of Representatives
- In office 20 October 1996 – 21 July 2009
- Preceded by: Constituency established
- Succeeded by: Takaaki Koga
- Constituency: Fukuoka 4th

Personal details
- Born: 7 April 1941 (age 85) Sue, Fukuoka, Japan
- Party: Liberal Democratic
- Education: Kyushu University

Tomoyoshi Watanabe (渡辺 具能, Watanabe Tomoyoshi; born 7 April 1941) is a retired Japanese politician of the Liberal Democratic Party, who served as a member of the House of Representatives in the Diet (national legislature). A native of Kasuya District, Fukuoka and graduate of Kyushu University, he worked at the Ministry of Transport from 1964 to 1994. After teaching at Fukuoka University, he was elected to the House of Representatives for the first time in 1996.
