= Munakata District, Fukuoka =

Former district in Fukuoka prefecture, Japan

Munakata (宗像郡, Munakata-gun) was a district located in Fukuoka Prefecture, Japan.

== Description ==
The cities once part of the district:

- Munakata
- Fukutsu

Now dissolved towns located in Munakata District:

- Fukuma - Now part of the city of Fukutsu
- Genkai - Now part of the city of Munakata
- Ōshima - Now part of the city of Munakata
- Tsuyazaki - Now part of the city of Fukutsu

== District Timeline ==
- On April 1, 2003 - the town of Genkai was merged into the expanded city of Munakata.
- On January 24, 2005 - the towns of Fukuma and Tsuyazaki were merged to create the city of Fukutsu.
- On March 28, 2005 - the village of Ōshima was merged into the expanded city of Munakata. Munakata District was dissolved as a result of this merger.
