= Fukutsu =

Fukutsu 福津市
- City
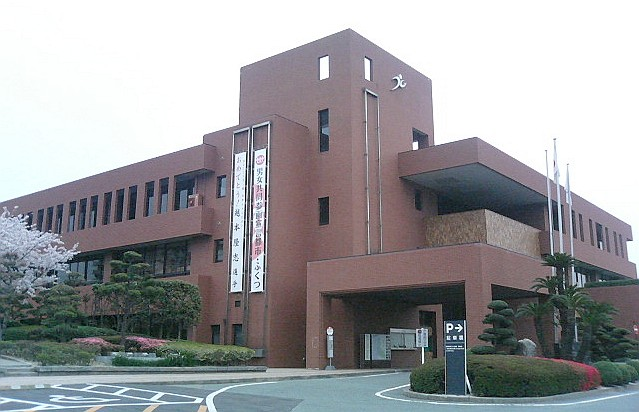
- Fukutsu City Hall

- Flag Emblem
- Location of Fukutsu in Fukuoka Prefecture

- Location in Japan
- Coordinates: 33°46′01″N 130°29′28″E
- Country: Japan
- Region: Kyushu
- Prefecture: Fukuoka

Government
  - Mayor: Tatsuo Koyama (since February 2009)

Area
  - Total: 52.76 km^{2} (20.37 sq mi)

Population (February 29, 2024)
  - Total: 68,834
  - Density: 1,305/km^{2} (3,379/sq mi)
- Time zone: UTC+09:00 (JST)
- City hall address: 1-1-1 Chuo, Fukutsu-shi, Fukuoka-ken 811-3293
- Website: Official website
- Symbols
- Flower: Field mustard
- Tree: Pine, Apricot

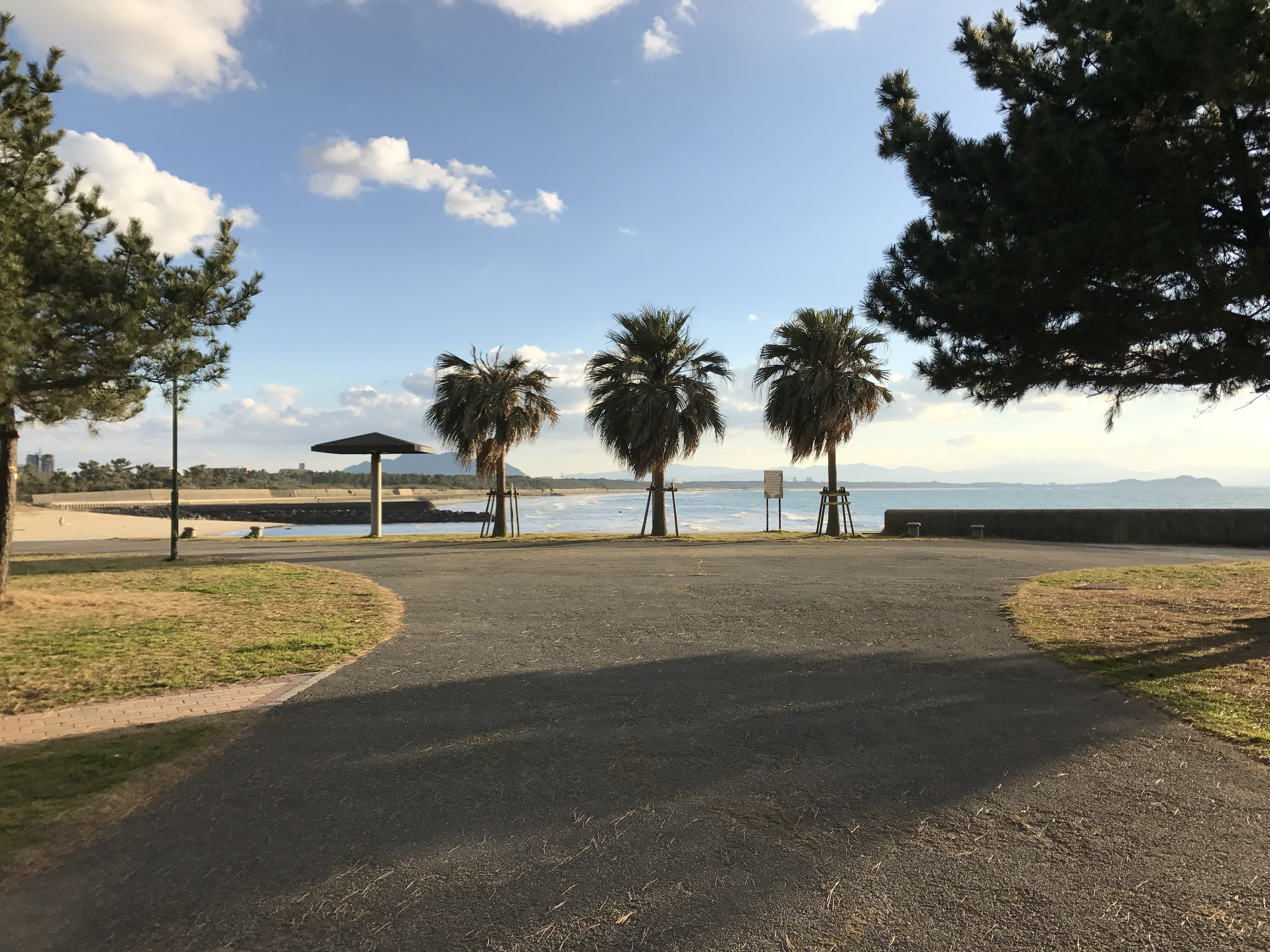
Fukuma Fishing Port Seaside Park

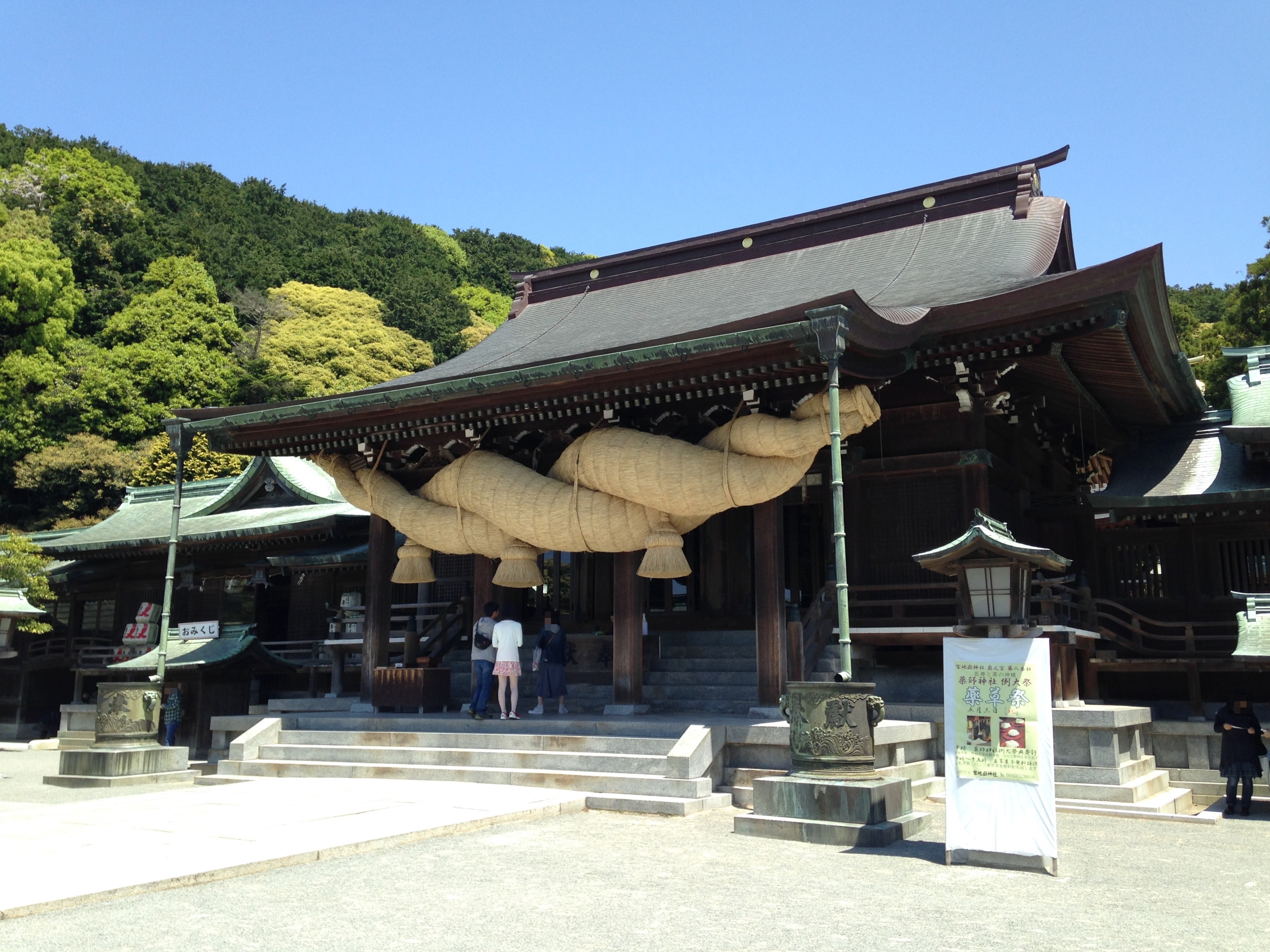
Miyajidake Shrine

Fukutsu (福津市, Fukutsu-shi) is a city located in Fukuoka Prefecture, Japan. As of 29 February 2024, the city had an estimated population of 68,834 in 31114 households, and a population density of 1300 persons per km^{2}. The total area of the city is 52.76 km^{2} (20.37 sq mi).

== Geography ==
Fukutsu is located in northern Fukuoka Prefecture, approximately midway between Fukuoka City and Kitakyushu City. It is surrounded by Mt. Kohbi, Mt. Motoki, and Mt. Iimori from the east to the south, and the Genkai Sea (Sea of Japan) to the northwest. The coast has been designated as part of the Genkai Quasi-National Park, and is a scenic area.

=== Neighboring municipalities ===
Fukuoka Prefecture

- Koga
- Miyawaka
- Munakata

=== Climate ===
Fukutsu has a humid subtropical climate (Köppen Cfa) characterized by warm summers and cool winters with light to no snowfall. The average annual temperature in Fukutsu is 15.8 °C. The average annual rainfall is 1599 mm with September as the wettest month.

=== Demographics ===
Per Japanese census data, the population of Fukutsu is as shown below

Historical population
Year	Pop.	±%
1940	22,569	—
1950	23,611	+4.6%
1960	31,023	+31.4%
1970	42,131	+35.8%
1980	49,573	+17.7%
1990	55,778	+12.5%
2000	55,436	−0.6%
2010	55,979	+1.0%
2020	67,033	+19.7%

== History ==
The area of Fukutsu was part of ancient Chikugo Province. During the Edo Period the area was under the control of Fukuoka Domain. After the Meiji restoration, the villages of Jingō and Kami-Saigō were established on May 1, 1889, with the creation of the modern municipalities system. The villages merged to form the town of Fukuma on April 1, 1954. Fukuma merged with the town of Tsuyazaki on January 24, 2005, and became the city of Fukutsu.

== Government ==
Fukutsu has a mayor-council form of government with a directly elected mayor and a unicameral city council of 18 members. Fukuma contributes one member to the Fukuoka Prefectural Assembly. In terms of national politics, the city is part of the Fukuoka 4th district of the lower house of the Diet of Japan.

== Economy ==
Fukutsu has a mixed economy centering on agriculture, commercial fishing and light manufacturing and food processing. An increasing percentage of the working population commutes to nearby Fukuoka or Kitakyushu cites for work, since large-scale public housing developments were built in the 1960s and 1970s.

== Education ==
Fukutsu has seven public elementary schools and three public junior high schools operated by the city government and two public high schools operated by the Fukuoka Prefectural Board of Education.

== Transportation ==
=== Railways ===
JR Kyushu - Kagoshima Main Line

JA Fukuma - Higashi-Fukuma

=== Highways ===
- National Route 3
- National Route 495

== Local attractions ==
- Miyajidake Shrine
