= Ongagawa Station =

Railway station in Onga, Fukuoka Prefecture, Japan

JA 17 Ongagawa Station 遠賀川駅
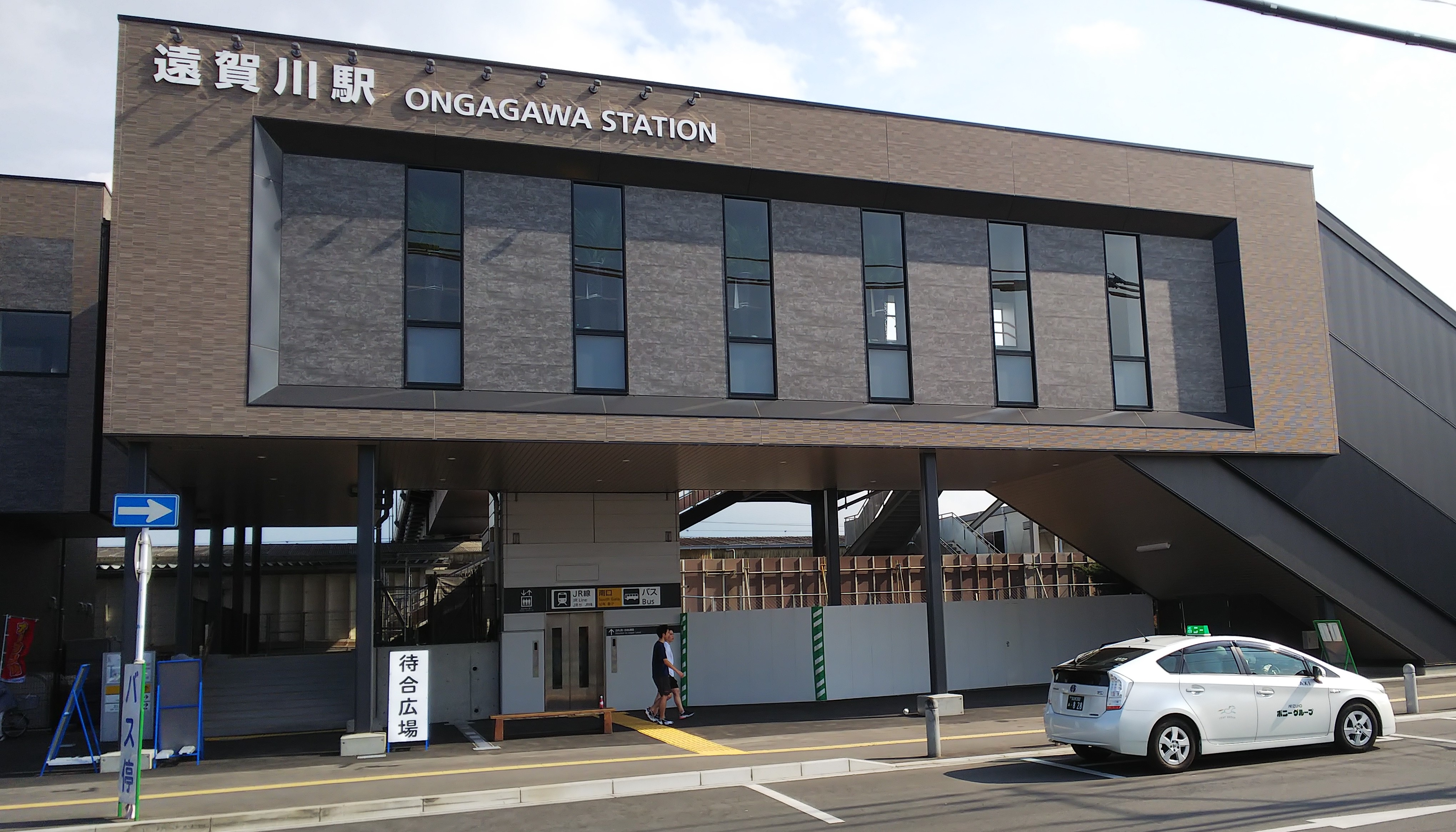
- Ongagawa Station in July 2021

General information
- Location: 1-chōme-1 Ongagawa, Onga-cho, Onga-gun, Fukuoka-ken 811-4307; Japan
- Coordinates: 33°50′49.01″N 130°40′24.42″E
- Operator: JR Kyushu
- Line: JA Kagoshima Main Line
- Distance: 34.3 km from Mojikō
- Platforms: 1 side + 1 island platforms
- Tracks: 3 + 1 passing loop + numerous sidings

Construction
- Structure type: At grade

Other information
- Status: Staffed (Midori no Madoguchi)
- Website: Official website

History
- Opened: 15 November 1890

Passengers
- FY2020: 1896 daily
- Rank: 77th (among JR Kyushu stations)

Services
Preceding station	JR Kyushu	Following station
Ebitsu towards Kagoshima	Kagoshima Main Line	Mizumaki towards Mojikō
Location
- Location within Fukuoka Prefecture Location within Japan

Ongagawa Station (遠賀川駅, Ongagawa-eki) is a passenger railway station located in the town of Onga, Fukuoka Prefecture, Japan. It is operated by JR Kyushu.

== Lines ==
The station is served by the Kagoshima Main Line and is located 34.3 km from the start of the line at Mojikō.

== Layout ==
The station consists of a side platform and an island platform serving three tracks, connected by footbridges with the station building. Track 1 is served by the platform 1, the side platform. A passing loop runs next to it and is designated track 2. Tracks 3 and 4 are served by platforms 2 and 3 (the island platform). Numerous sidings run to the south of track 4. The station has a Midori no Madoguchi staffed ticket office.

=== Platforms ===
1	■ JA Kagoshima Main Line	for Shimonoseki and Kokura
2, 3	■ JA Kagoshima Main Line	for Akama and Hakata

== History ==
The station was opened by the privately run Kyushu Railway on 15 November 1890 as the northern terminus of a stretch of track from Kurume. It became a through-station on 28 February 1891 when the track was extended further north to Kurosaki. When the Kyushu Railway was nationalized on 1 July 1907, Japanese Government Railways (JGR) took over control of the station. On 12 October 1909, the station became part of the Hitoyoshi Main Line and then on 21 November 1909, part of the Kagoshima Main Line. With the privatization of Japanese National Railways (JNR), the successor of JGR, on 1 April 1987, JR Kyushu took over control of the station. On 30 August 2017, the station building was destroyed in a fire which spread from a food-retail tenant. A new station building was completed on 31 July 2021.

== Passenger statistics ==
In fiscal 2020, the station was used by an average of 1896 passengers daily (boarding passengers only), and it ranked 77th among the busiest stations of JR Kyushu.

== Surrounding area ==
- Onga Town Hall
- Japan National Route 3

== See also ==
- List of railway stations in Japan
