= Mizumaki, Fukuoka =

Mizumaki 水巻町
- Town
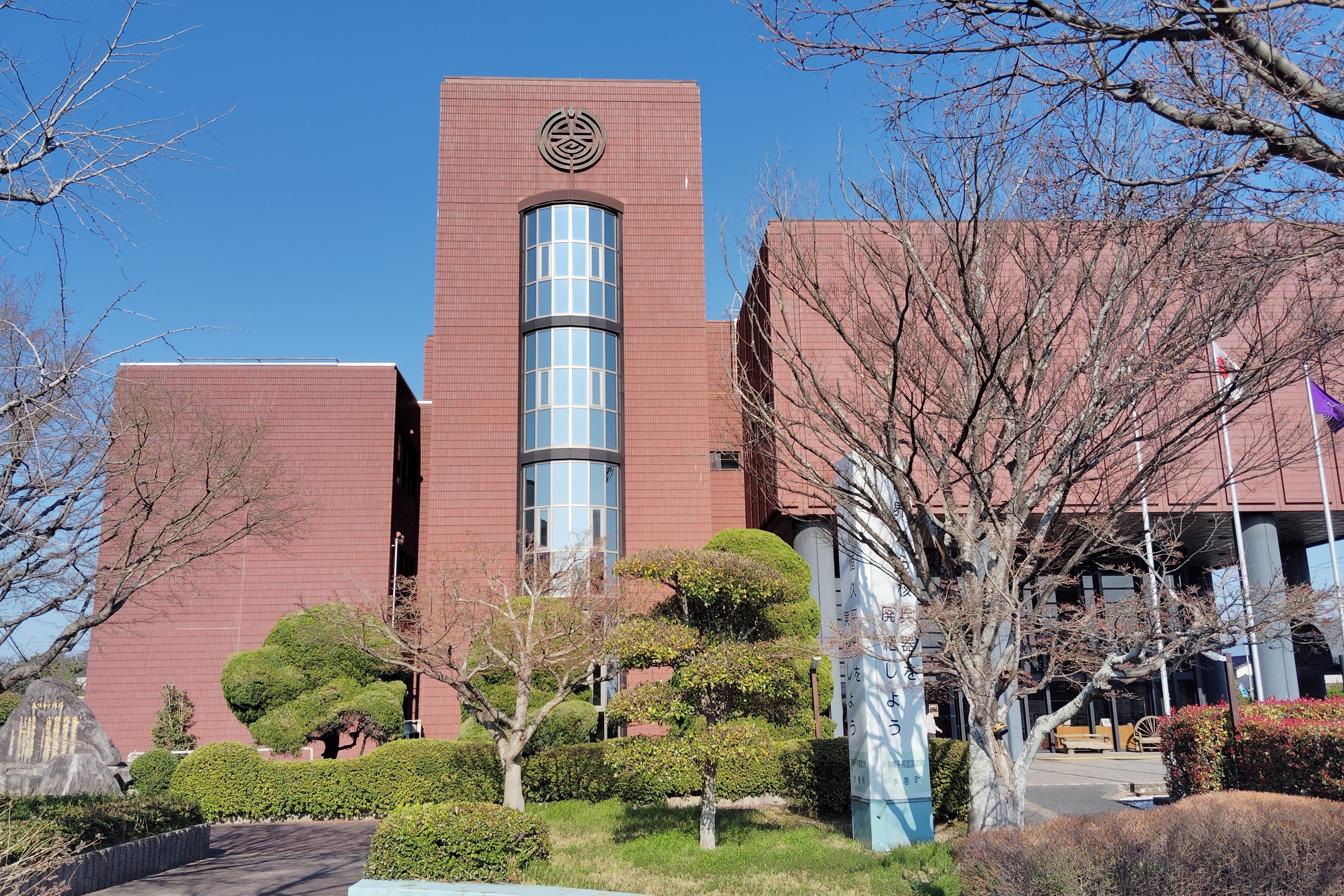
- Mizumaki Town hall

- Flag Emblem
- Interactive map of Mizumaki
- Location in Japan
- Coordinates: 33°51′17″N 130°41′42″E
- Country: Japan
- Region: Kyushu
- Prefecture: Fukuoka
- District: Onga

Area
  - Total: 11.01 km^{2} (4.25 sq mi)

Population (February 29, 2024)
  - Total: 27,571
  - Density: 2,504/km^{2} (6,486/sq mi)
- Time zone: UTC+09:00 (JST)
- City hall address: 1-1-1 Suekita, Mizumaki-cho, Onga-gun, Fukuoka-ken 807-0021
- Website: Official website
- Symbols
- Flower: Cosmos
- Tree: Ginkgo

Mizumaki (水巻町, Mizumaki-machi) is a town located in Onga District, Fukuoka Prefecture, Japan. As of 29 February 2024, the town had an estimated population of 27,571 in 13687 households, and a population density of 2500 persons per km^{2}. The total area of the town is 11.01 km^{2} (4.25 sq mi).

== Geography ==
Mizumaki is located in north-central Fukuoka Prefecture, bordered by Kitakyūshū City on the east and the Onga River on the west.

=== Neighboring municipalities ===
Fukuoka Prefecture

- Ashiya
- Kitakyūshū
- Nakama
- Onga

=== Climate ===
Mizumaki has a humid subtropical climate (Köppen Cfa) characterized by warm summers and cool winters with light to no snowfall. The average annual temperature in Mizumaki is 16.0 °C. The average annual rainfall is 1560 mm with September as the wettest month. The temperatures are highest on average in August, at around 27.1 °C, and lowest in January, at around 5.7 °C.

=== Demographics ===
Per Japanese census data, the population of Mizumaki is as shown below

Historical population
Year	Pop.	±%
1940	24,740	—
1950	31,386	+26.9%
1960	34,927	+11.3%
1970	26,977	−22.8%
1980	27,196	+0.8%
1990	29,756	+9.4%
2000	31,623	+6.3%
2010	30,028	−5.0%
2020	28,114	−6.4%

== History ==
The area of Mizumaki was part of ancient Chikuzen Province. About 3000 years ago, the large Ko-Onga Bay covered the area where the town of Mizumaki now lies. Soil and silt carried by the Onga River gradually built up until a flat plain was built up in the area. People began living and planting rice crops on that ground. Terrible floods continually plagued the area. During the Edo Period the area was under the control of Fukuoka Domain. After the Meiji restoration, the village of Mizumaki was established on May 1, 1889, with the creation of the modern municipalities system. Mizumaki was raised to town status on February 1, 1940.

Mizumaki was the site of "Japan Coal Mining Company, Onga Coal Mine" which used forced laborers in the mine, particularly Dutch, American and British POWs in World War II. A memorial called "The Memorial Cross " commemorates the allied POWs who died during the war.

== Government ==
Mizumaki has a mayor-council form of government with a directly elected mayor and a unicameral town council of 14 members. Mizumaki, collectively with the other municipalities of Onga District, contributes two members to the Fukuoka Prefectural Assembly. In terms of national politics, the town is part of the Fukuoka 8th district of the lower house of the Diet of Japan.

== Economy ==
During the Meiji period, Mizumaki, along with the municipalities of the Chikuho area, developed with the Kitakyushu industrial zone through coal mining, and is still considered part of to the Greater Kitakyushu Metropolitan Area. However, as the demand for coal decreased due to the energy revolution, the coal mines that had sponsored prosperity have closed, leading to depopulation. The population continued to decline as coal mines closed. However, as the city began to develop as a commuter town by taking advantage of its location near Kitakyushu City,

== Education ==
Mizumaki has five public elementary schools and two public junior high schools operated by the town government. The town does not have a high school.

== Transportation ==
=== Railways ===
JR Kyushu - Kagoshima Main Line

JA Mizumaki

JR Kyushu - Chikuhō Main Line

JC Higashi-Mizumaki

=== Highways ===
- National Route 3
