= Koga Station (Fukuoka) =

Railway station in Koga, Fukuoka Prefecture, Japan

JA 09 Koga Station 古賀駅
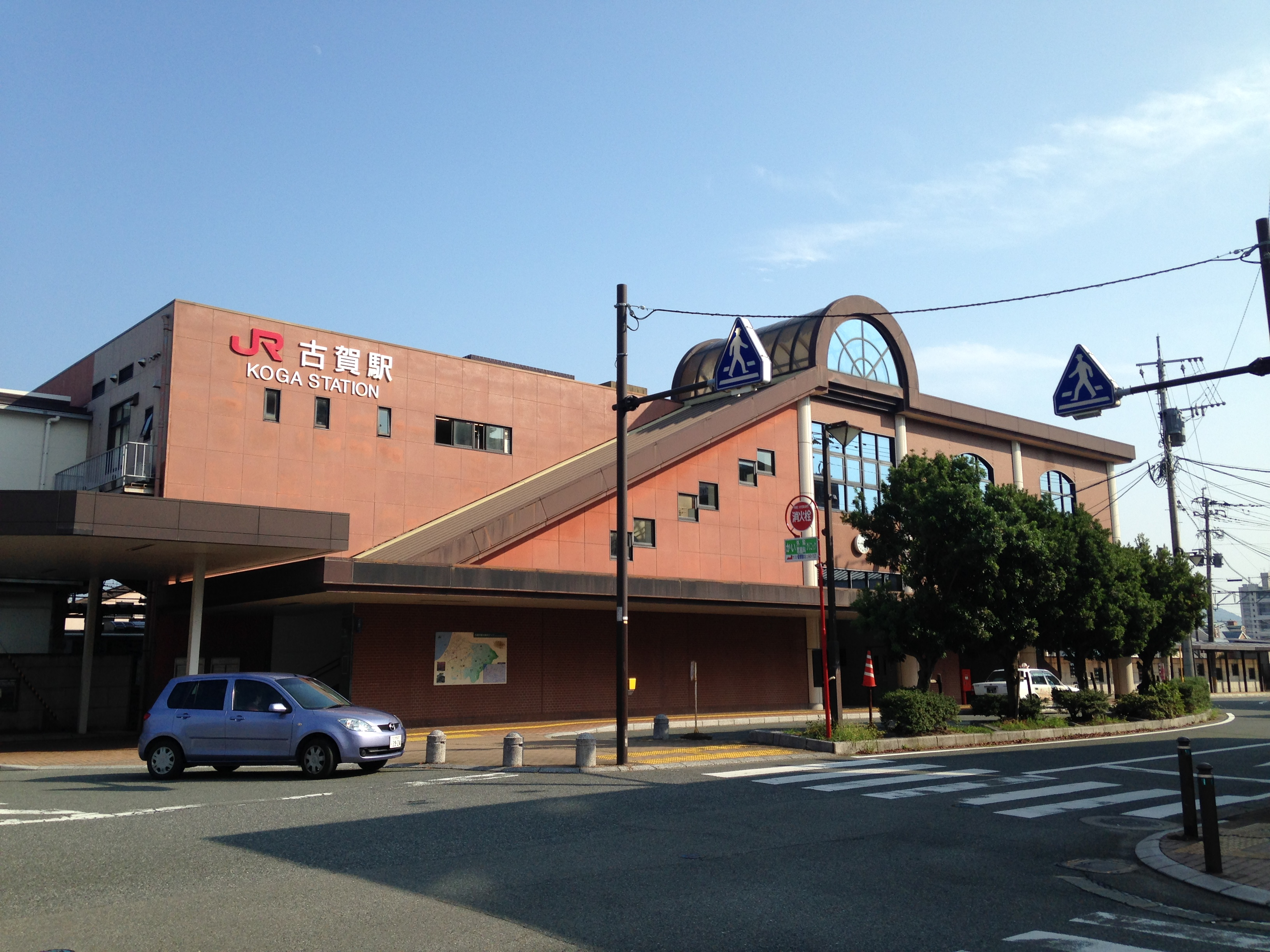
- Koga Station in 2016

General information
- Location: 3-chōme-2 Ekihigashi, Koga-shi, Fukuoka-ken 811-3102; Japan
- Coordinates: 33°43′58″N 130°28′00″E
- Operator: JR Kyushu
- Line: JA Kagoshima Main Line
- Distance: 60.6 km from Mojikō
- Platforms: 2 island platforms
- Tracks: 4 + 2 sidings

Construction
- Structure type: Elevated

Other information
- Status: Staffed ( Midori no Madoguchi )
- Website: Official website

History
- Opened: 28 September 1890

Passengers
- FY2020: 5432 daily
- Rank: 21st (among JR Kyushu stations)

Services
Preceding station	JR Kyushu	Following station
Shishibu towards Kagoshima	Kagoshima Main Line	Chidori towards Mojikō
Location
- Location within Fukuoka Prefecture Location within Japan

Koga Station (古賀駅, Koga-eki) is a passenger railway station located in the city of Koga, Fukuoka Prefecture, Japan. It is operated by JR Kyushu.

== Lines ==
The station is served by the Kagoshima Main Line and is located 60.6 km from the starting point of the line at Mojikō.

== Layout ==
The station consists of two island platforms serving four tracks. Two sidings branch off track 4. The platforms are connected by an elevated station building which has a Midori no Madoguchi staffed ticket office.

=== Platforms ===
1, 2	■ JA Kagoshima Main Line	for Orio and Kokura
3, 4	■ JA Kagoshima Main Line	for Kurume and Hakata

== History ==
The privately run Kyushu Railway had begun laying down its network on Kyushu in 1889 and by 1890 had a stretch of track from Hakata southwards to Kurume. The track was extended northwards from Hakata to Akama by 28 September 1890, with Koga being opened on the same day as one of the intermediate stations. When the Kyushu Railway was nationalized on 1 July 1907, Japanese Government Railways (JGR) took over control of the station. On 12 October 1909, the station became part of the Hitoyoshi Main Line and then on 21 November 1909, part of the Kagoshima Main Line. With the privatization of Japanese National Railways (JNR), the successor of JGR, on 1 April 1987, JR Kyushu took over control of the station.

== Passenger statistics ==
In fiscal 2020, the station was used by an average of 5,432 passengers daily (boarding passengers only), and it ranked 21st among the busiest stations of JR Kyushu.

== Surrounding area ==
- Fukuoka Prefectural Public Koga Jinseikan High School
- Fukuoka Jo Gakuin Nursing University and Graduate School of Fukuoka Jo Gakuin Nursing University
- Koga City History Museum/Koga City Library

== See also ==
- List of railway stations in Japan
