= Chidori Station =

Railway station in Koga, Fukuoka Prefecture, Japan

JA 10 Chidori Station 千鳥駅
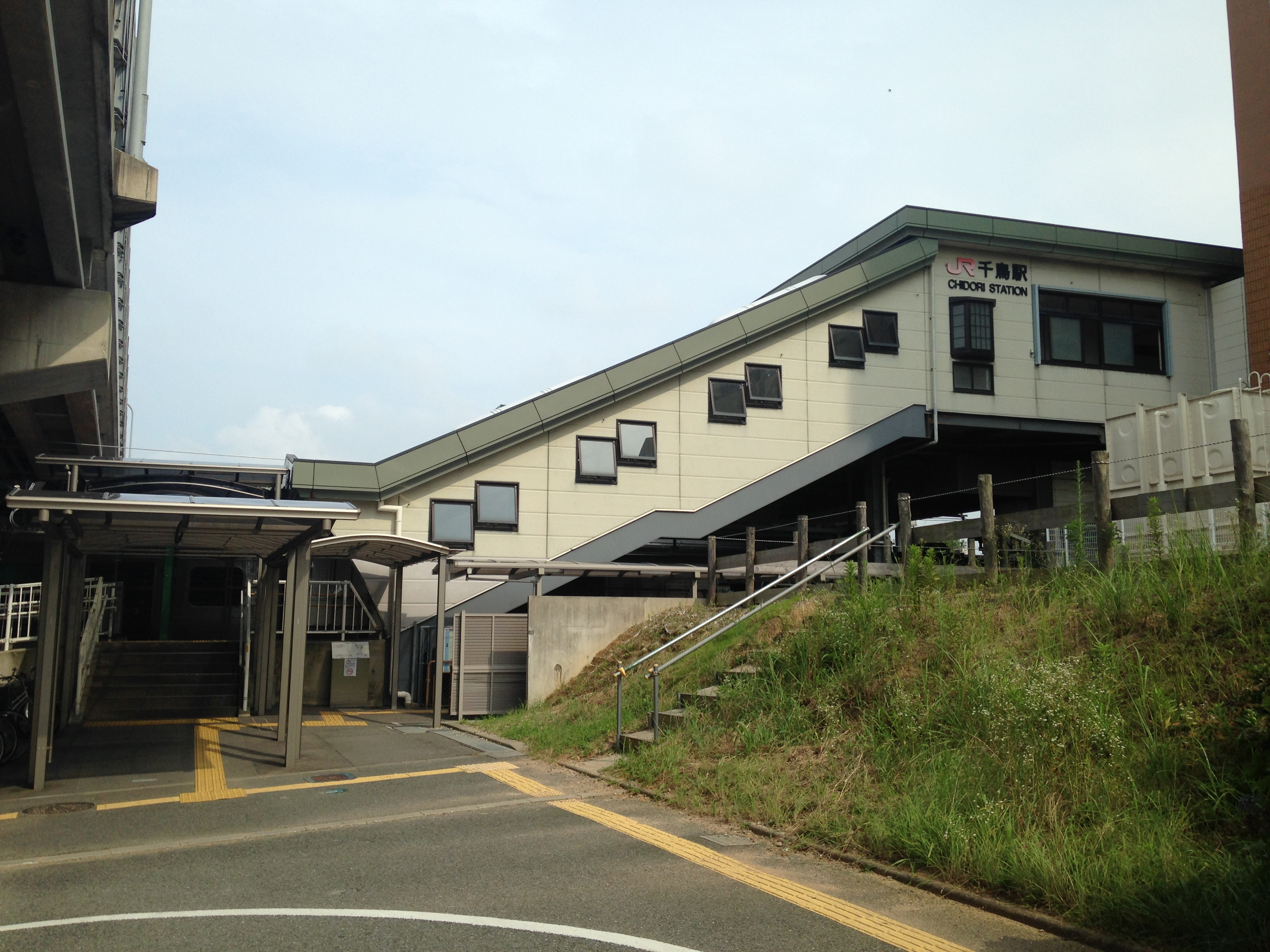
- Chidori Station in 2016

General information
- Location: 5 Chome-9-1 Chidori, Koga-shi, Fukuoka-ken 811-3113; Japan
- Coordinates: 33°44′56″N 130°28′35″E
- Operator: JR Kyushu
- Line: JA Kagoshima Main Line
- Distance: 58.5 km from Mojikō
- Platforms: 2 side platforms
- Tracks: 2

Construction
- Structure type: Elevated

Other information
- Status: Staffed
- Website: Official website

History
- Opened: 30 September 1991

Passengers
- FY2020: 3039 daily
- Rank: 52nd (among JR Kyushu stations)

Services
Preceding station	JR Kyushu	Following station
Koga towards Kagoshima	Kagoshima Main Line	Fukuma towards Mojikō
Location
- Location within Fukuoka Prefecture Location within Japan

Chidori Station (千鳥駅, Chidori-eki) is a passenger railway station located in the city of Koga, Fukuoka Prefecture, Japan. It is operated by JR Kyushu.

== Lines ==
The station is served by the Kagoshima Main Line and is located 58.5 km from the starting point of the line at Mojikō.

== Layout ==
The station consists of two opposed side platforms serving two tracks. The platforms are connected by an elevated station building, which is staffed.

=== Platforms ===
1	■ JA Kagoshima Main Line	for Orio and Kokura
2	■ JA Kagoshima Main Line	for Kurume, Tosu and Hakata

== History ==
The station was opened by JR Kyushu on 30 September 1991 as an added station on the existing Kagoshima Main Line track.

== Passenger statistics ==
In fiscal 2020, the station was used by an average of 3039 passengers daily (boarding passengers only), and it ranked 52nd among the busiest stations of JR Kyushu.

== Surrounding area ==
- Koga City Koga Kita Junior High School
- Koga City Chidori Elementary School
- Fukuoka Prefectural Koga Special Needs School

== See also ==
- List of railway stations in Japan
