= Mizumaki Station =

Railway station in Mizumaki, Fukuoka Prefecture, Japan

JA 18 Mizumaki Station 水巻駅
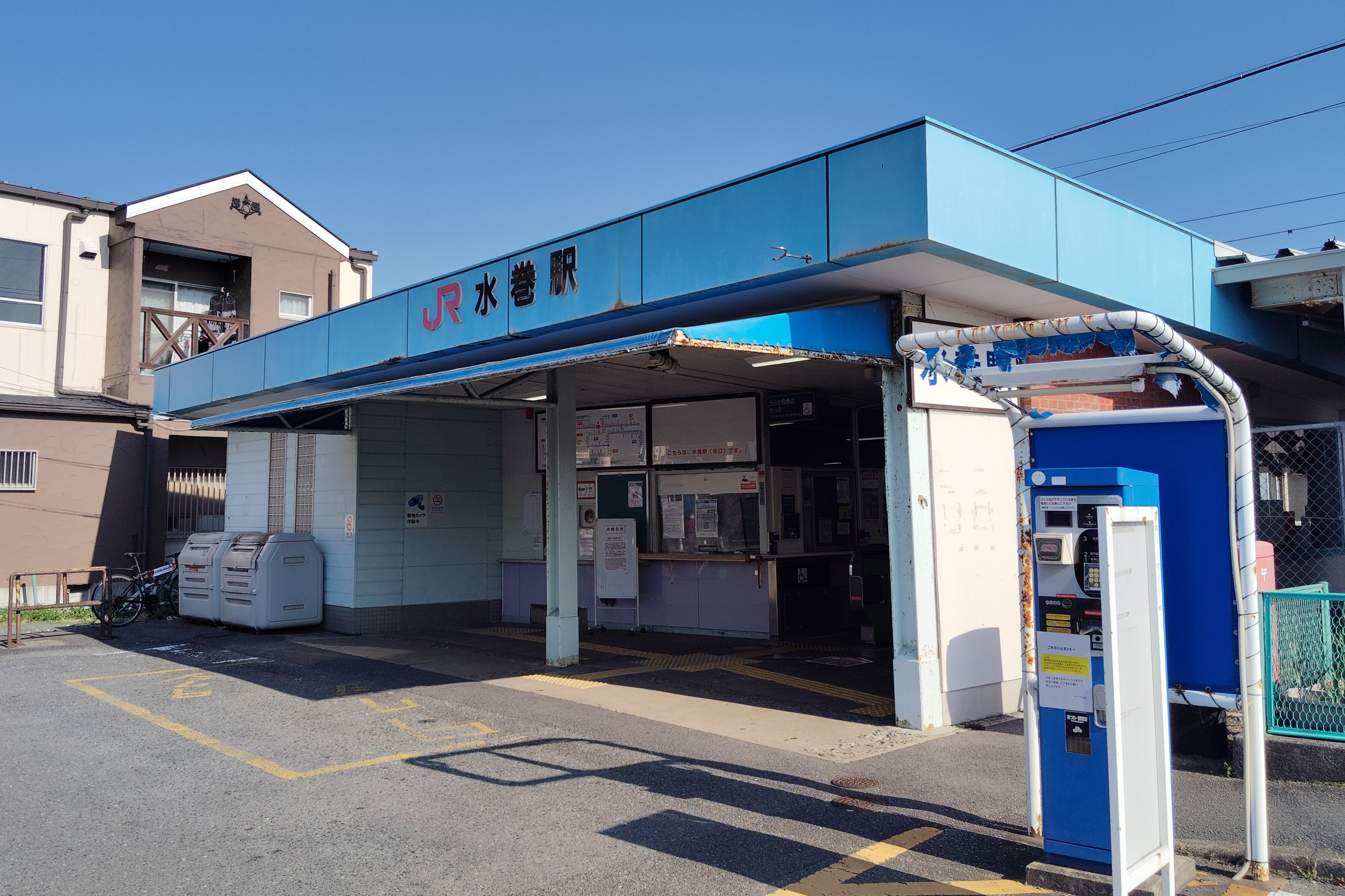
- Mizumaki Station in 2026

General information
- Location: 1-chōme-6 Korosueminami, Mizumaki-cho, Onga-gun, Fukuoka-ken 807-0025; Japan
- Coordinates: 33°51′8.38″N 130°41′40.58″E
- Operator: JR Kyushu
- Line: JA Kagoshima Main Line
- Distance: 32.2 km from Mojikō
- Platforms: 2 side platforms
- Tracks: 2

Construction
- Structure type: At grade

Other information
- Status: Staffed
- Website: Official website

History
- Opened: 1 October 1961

Passengers
- FY2020: 1598 daily
- Rank: 90th (among JR Kyushu stations)

Services
Preceding station	JR Kyushu	Following station
Ongagawa towards Kagoshima	Kagoshima Main Line	Orio towards Mojikō
Location
- Location within Fukuoka Prefecture Location within Japan

Mizumaki Station (水巻駅, Mizumaki-eki) is a passenger railway station located in the town of Mizumaki, Fukuoka Prefecture, Japan. It is operated by JR Kyushu.

== Lines ==
The station is served by the Kagoshima Main Line and is located 32.2 km from the start of the line at Mojikō.

== Layout ==
The station consists of two opposed side platforms serving two tracks. There is a level crossing on the west side of the station (near the Onga River), and the station building (ticket gates) are located on both platforms 1 and 2. The north exit station building is adjacent to platform 1, and the south exit station building is adjacent to platform 2. However, during the day, the south exit is unstaffed and only the automatic ticket gates are in operation. There is an underground passage within the ticket gate, and it is also possible to move between the two platforms within the ticket gate. A slope has been built from the north exit to platform 1, and an elevator has been built from the south exit to platform 2, but there are steps as there is no connection to the underground passage.

=== Platforms ===
1	■ JA Kagoshima Main Line	for Shimonoseki and Kokura
2	■ JA Kagoshima Main Line	for Akama and Hakata

== History ==
The station was opened by Japanese National Railways (JNR) on 1 October 1961 as an added station on the existing Kagoshima Main Line track. With the privatization of JNR on 1 April 1987, JR Kyushu took over control of the station.

== Passenger statistics ==
In fiscal 2020, the station was used by an average of 1598 passengers daily (boarding passengers only), and it ranked 90th among the busiest stations of JR Kyushu.

== Surrounding area ==
- Japan National Route 3

== See also ==
- List of railway stations in Japan
