= Japan National Route 495 =

Road in Fukuoka prefecture, Japan

National Route 495
- 国道495号
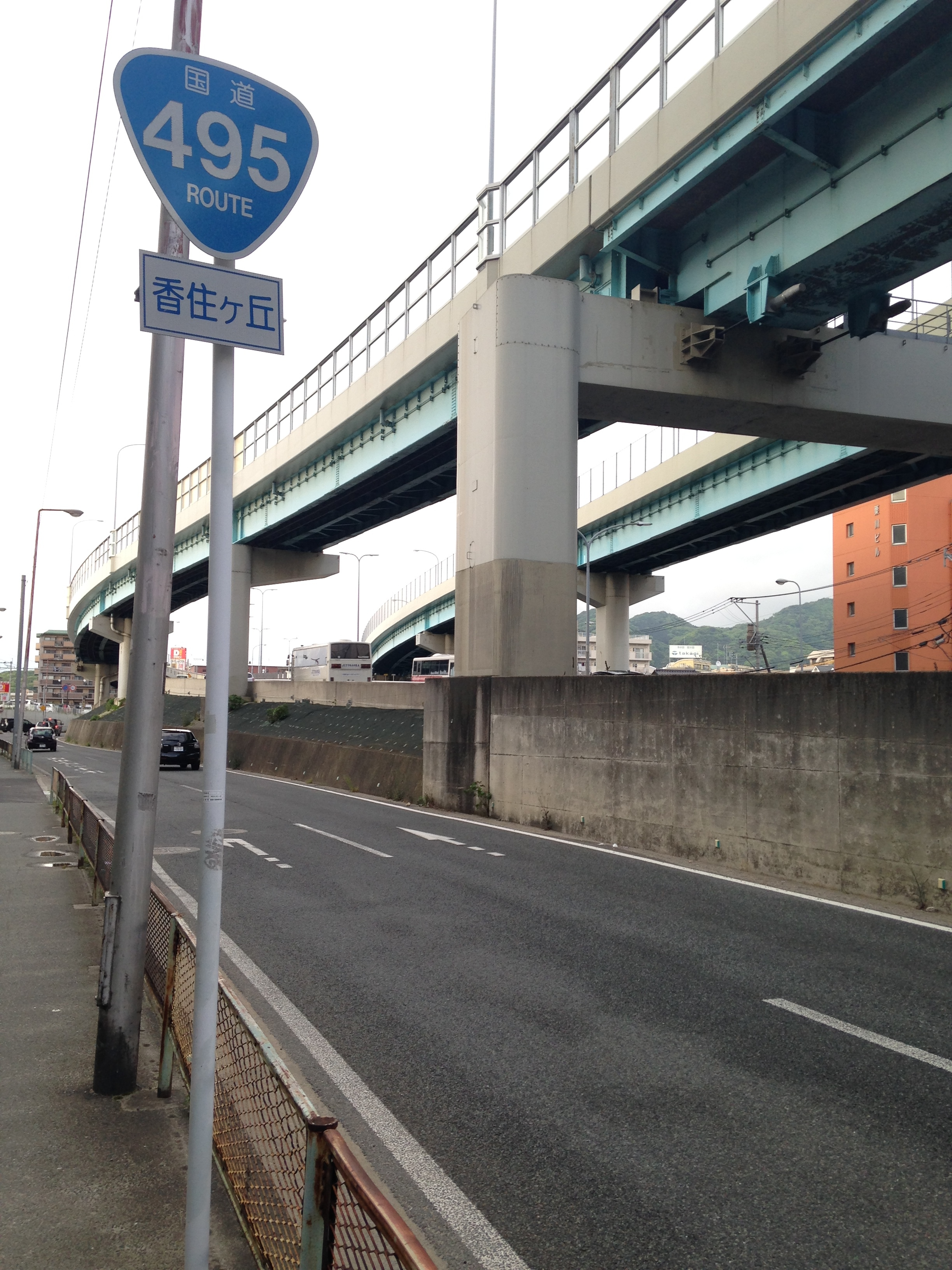

Route information
- Length: 63.4 km (39.4 mi)

Location
- Country: Japan

Highway system
- National highways of Japan; Expressways of Japan
← National Route 494	→ National Route 496

National Route 495 is a national highway of Japan connecting between Wakamatsu-ku, Kitakyushu and Higashi-ku, Fukuoka in Japan, with total length has 63.4 km (39.4 mi).
