= Sakurakyō Kofun =

Kofun period burial mound in Munakata, Japan

- 桜京古墳 (Japanese)
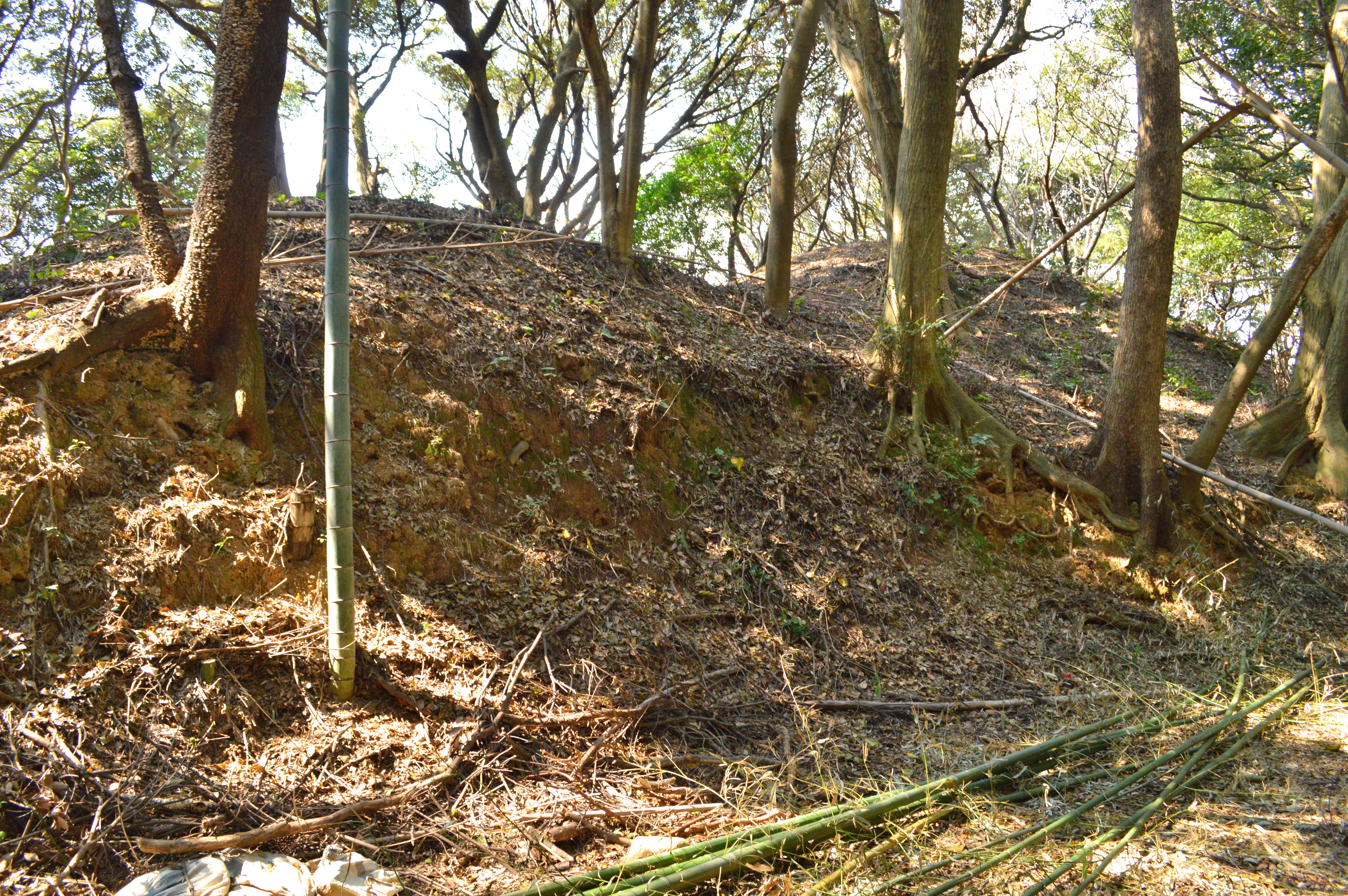
- Sakurakyō Kofun

- Sakurakyō Kofun Sakurakyō Kofun (Japan)
- Interactive map of Sakurakyō Kofun
- 33°50′38″N 130°29′43″E
- Type: Kofun
- Periods: Kofun period
- Location: Munakata, Fukuoka, Japan
- Region: Kyushu

History
- Built: c.6th century

Site notes
- Public access: Yes (no facilities)

The Sakurakyō Kofun (桜京古墳) is a Kofun period burial mound, located in the Mutajiri neighborhood of the city of Munakata, Fukuoka Prefecture Japan. The tumulus was designated a National Historic Site of Japan in 1976.

== Overview ==
The Sakurakyō Kofun is a zenpō-kōen-fun (前方後円墳), which is shaped like a keyhole, having one square end and one circular end, when viewed from above. It is the center of a cluster of approximately 80 burial mounds facing the Genkai Sea on a hill with an elevation of about 42 meters. It has a total length is about 41 meters; the diameter of the posterior circular portion is about 18 meters, the height is about 4 meters, and the width of the anterior rectangular portion is about 10 meters with a height of 2.5 meters. The tumulus is orientated to the south, and the west side is slightly deformed. No fukiishi or shards of haniwa have been found, nor has any trace of a moat been discovered. The horizontal-entry cave-style stone burial chamber is a multi-chambered structure in the center of the posterior circle, opening to the west. The back room is 3.7 meters long, about 2.2 meters wide, and about 3.6 meters high, with a stone house shaped sarcophagus attached to the rear wall, and the front room is about half the size of the back room. It was already opened in 1673, and no grave goods have been passed down. The tumulus is a decorated kofun. The pillar stones and back wall are divided into sections with a triangular pattern made of vertical, horizontal, and diagonal line carvings, and each section is painted with red, yellow, and blue pigments, and the upper part is painted red. Judging from the structure of the burial chamber and the shape of the tumulus, it is believed to have been constructed in the 6th century, or the last Kofun period. From the five small enpun (円墳) circular tumuli surrounding the main tumulus, iron arrowheads, metal utensils (bow fittings), and shards of Sue ware and Haji ware pottery have been found.

Although many decorated kofun have been found along the coast of the Ariake Sea in the Kyushu, this is the only one to have been found in along the coast of the Genkai Sea, and its presence outside the distribution area for decorative kofun suggests cultural or political interaction between the regions. This kofun was included in the UNESCO World Heritage Site Sacred Island of Okinoshima and Associated Sites in the Munakata Region submission in 2009, but was later removed from the constituent assets when it was officially registered in 2017.

The tumulus is approximately 2.4 kilometers northwest of Munakata Shrine or 7.4 kilometers (15 minutes by car) from JR Kyushu Kagoshima Main Line Tōgō Station.

== See also ==
- List of Historic Sites of Japan (Fukuoka)
- Decorated kofun
