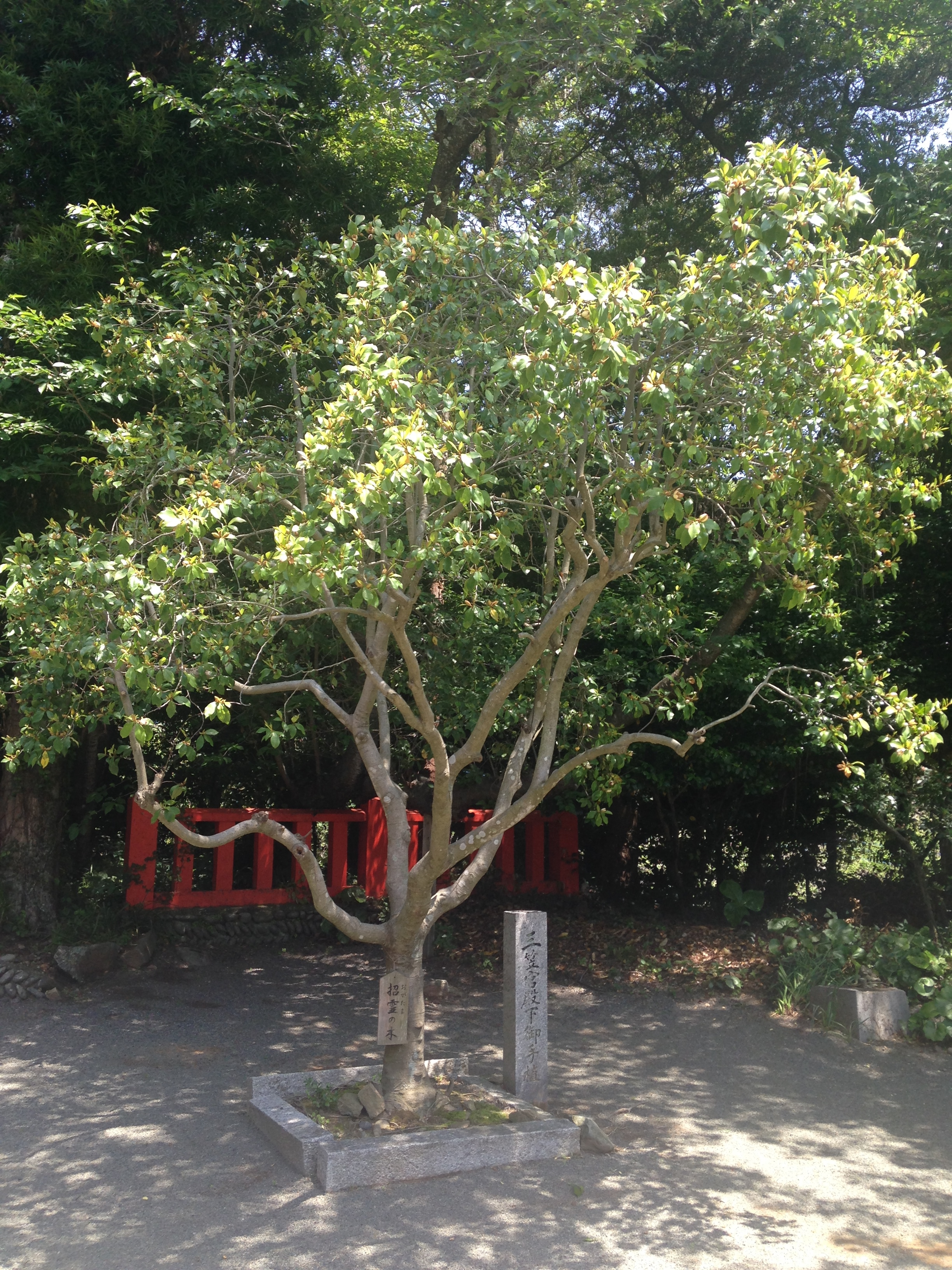
- A specimen planted by Prince Mikasa at Nakatsu shrine on Ōshima island
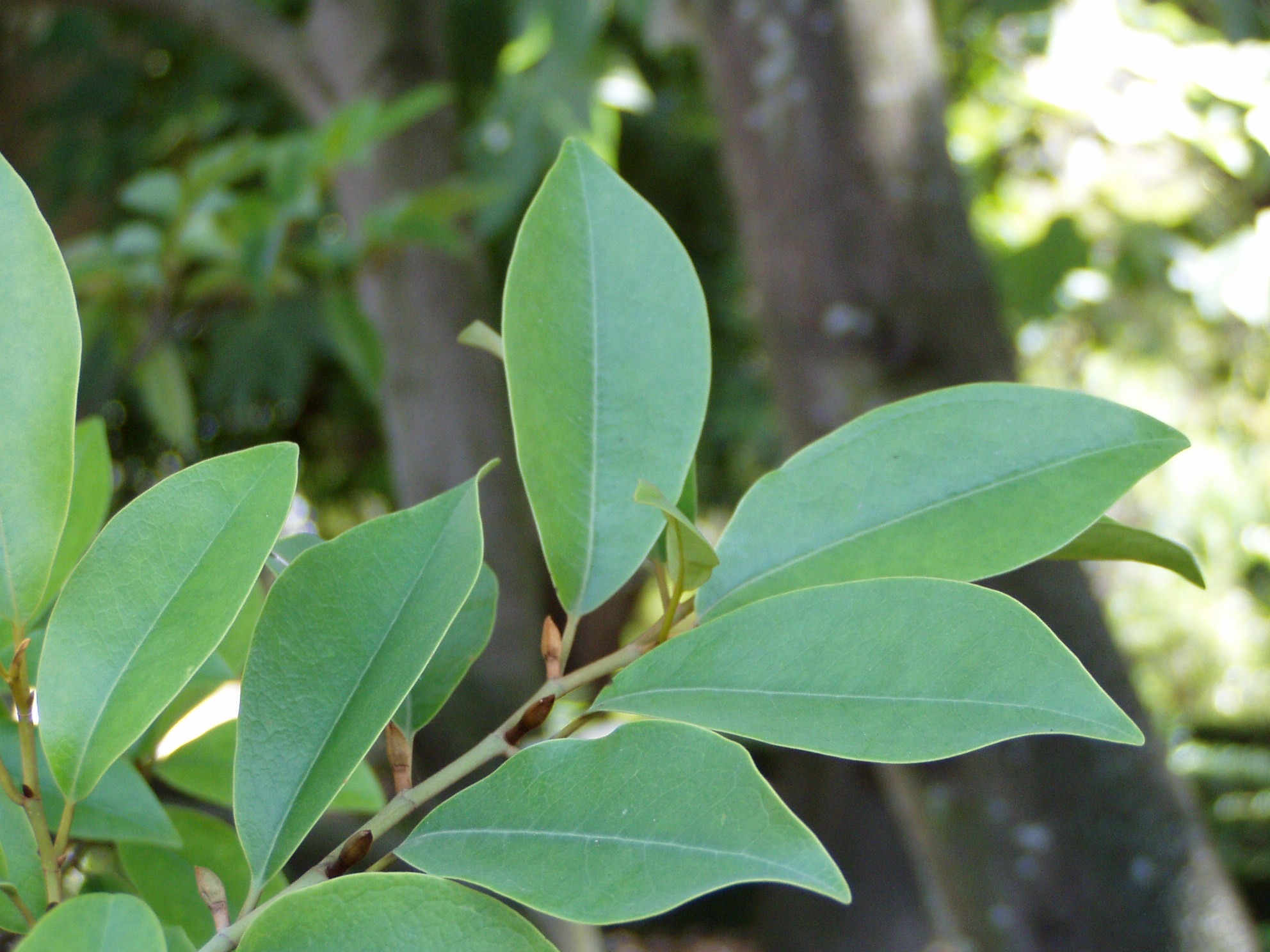
- Leaves

Conservation status
- Data Deficient (IUCN 3.1)

Scientific classification
- Kingdom: Plantae
- Clade: Embryophytes
- Clade: Tracheophytes
- Clade: Spermatophytes
- Clade: Angiosperms
- Clade: Magnoliids
- Order: Magnoliales
- Family: Magnoliaceae
- Genus: Magnolia
- Species: M. compressa

Binomial name
- Magnolia compressa Maxim.

Synonyms
- List: Magnolia compressa var. formosana (Kaneh.) C.F.Chen; Magnolia compressa var. lanyuensis (S.Y.Lu) C.F.Chen; Magnolia formosana (Kaneh.) Yonek.; Michelia compressa (Maxim.) Sarg.; Michelia compressa var. formosana Kaneh.; Michelia compressa var. lanyuensis S.Y.Lu; Michelia cumingii Merr. & Rolfe; Michelia formosana (Kaneh.) Masam. & Suzuki; Michelia parviflora Merr.

= Magnolia compressa =

Species of flowering plant

Magnolia compressa is a species of flowering plant in the family Magnoliaceae, native to Yunnan, Taiwan, the Ryukyu Islands, and southwest Japan, and introduced to South Korea. A small tree when in cultivation, it is hardy only to USDA zone 10. It may be planted in containers and brought indoors in the winter.

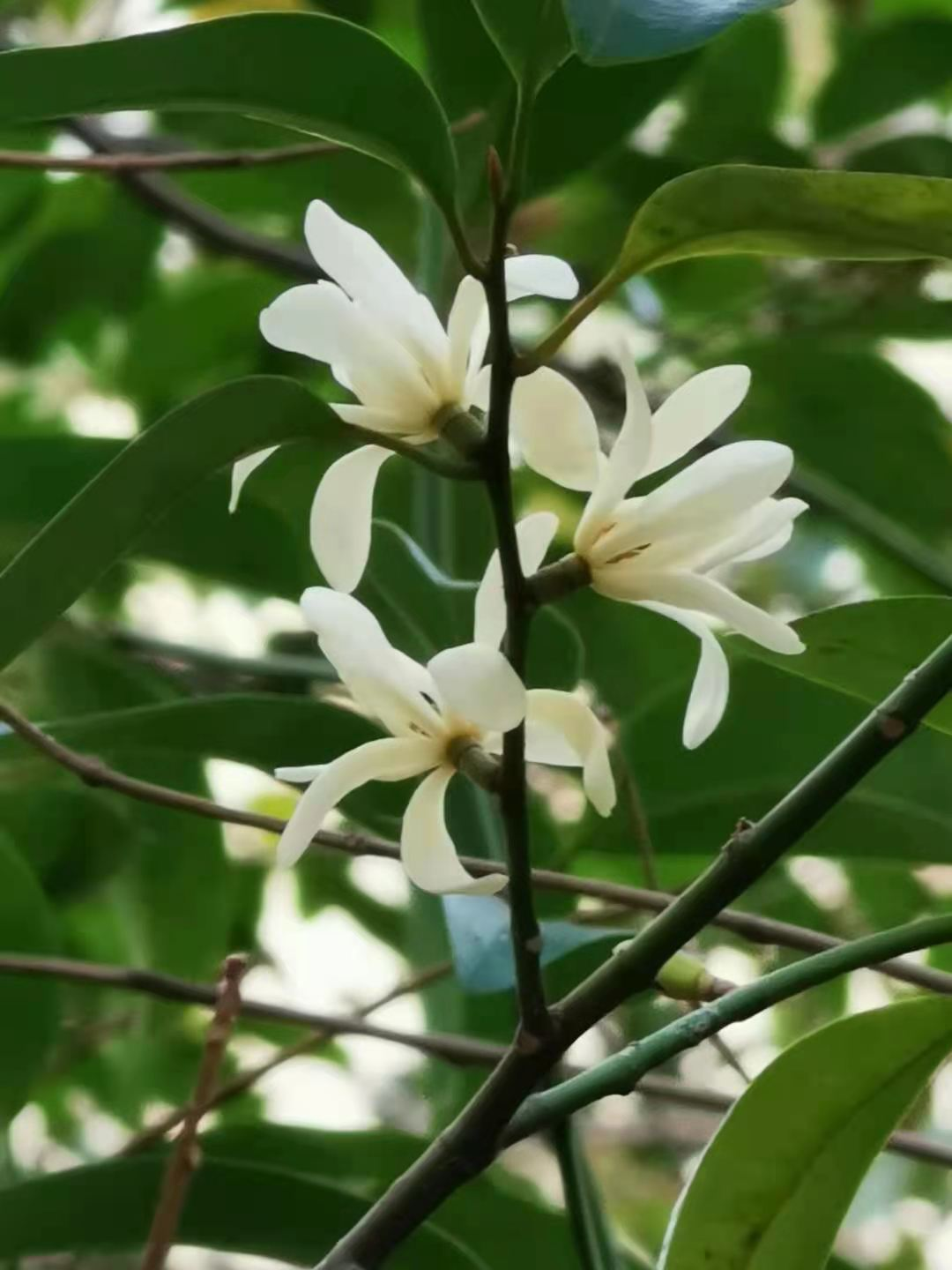
Michelia compressa var. lanyuensis. In 2000, it was published as endemic to Taiwan.

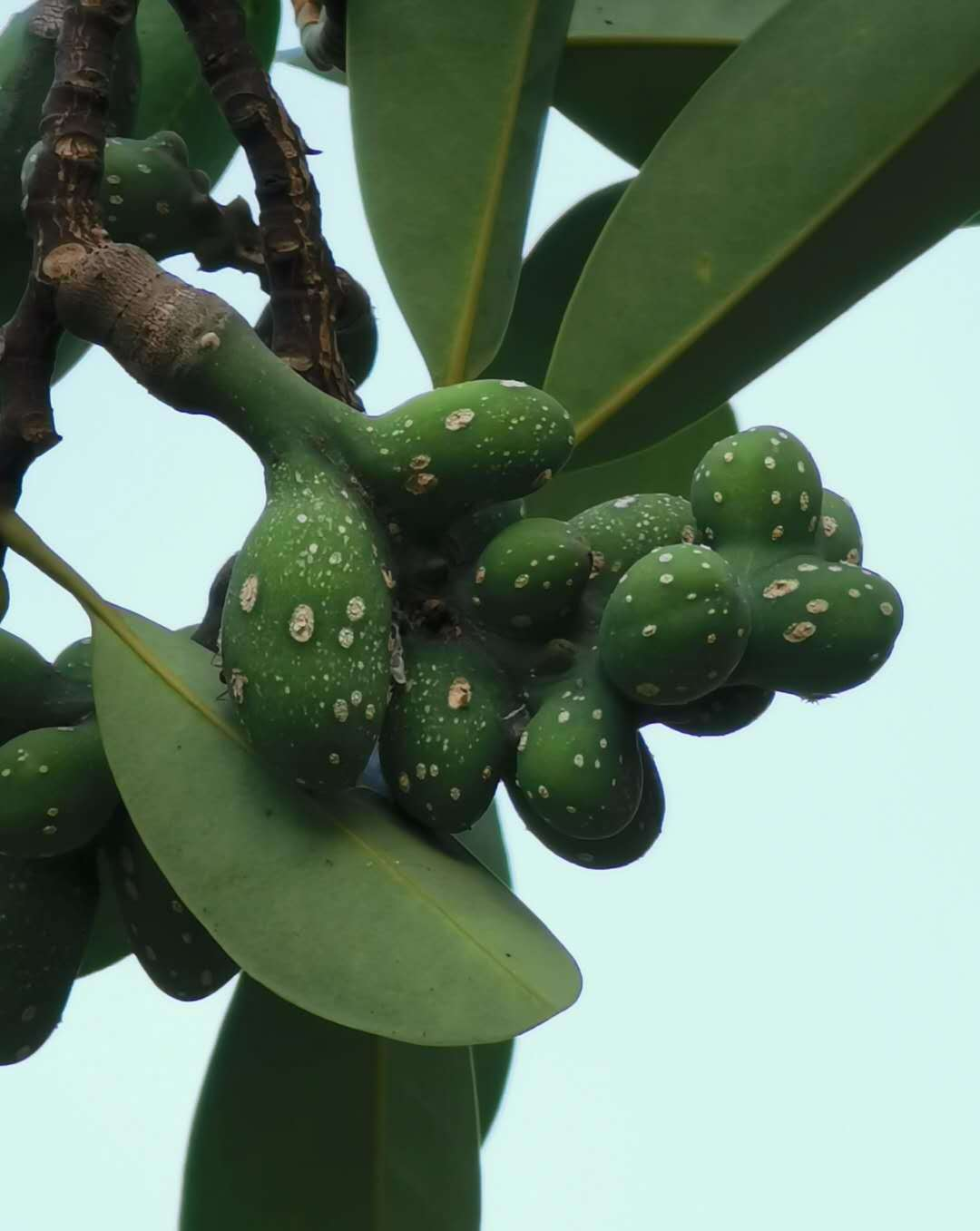
Michelia compressa var. lanyuensis

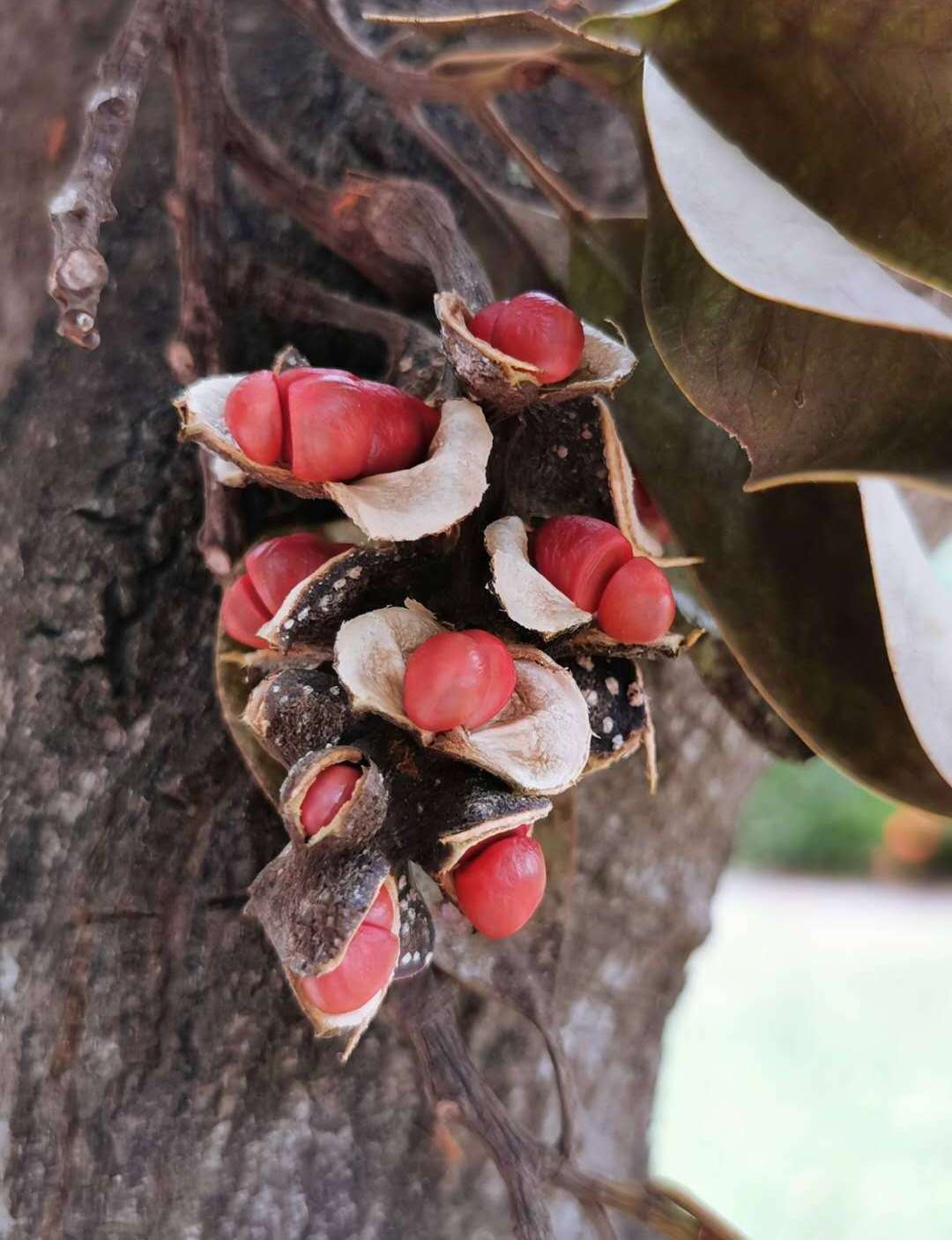
Michelia compressa var. lanyuensis

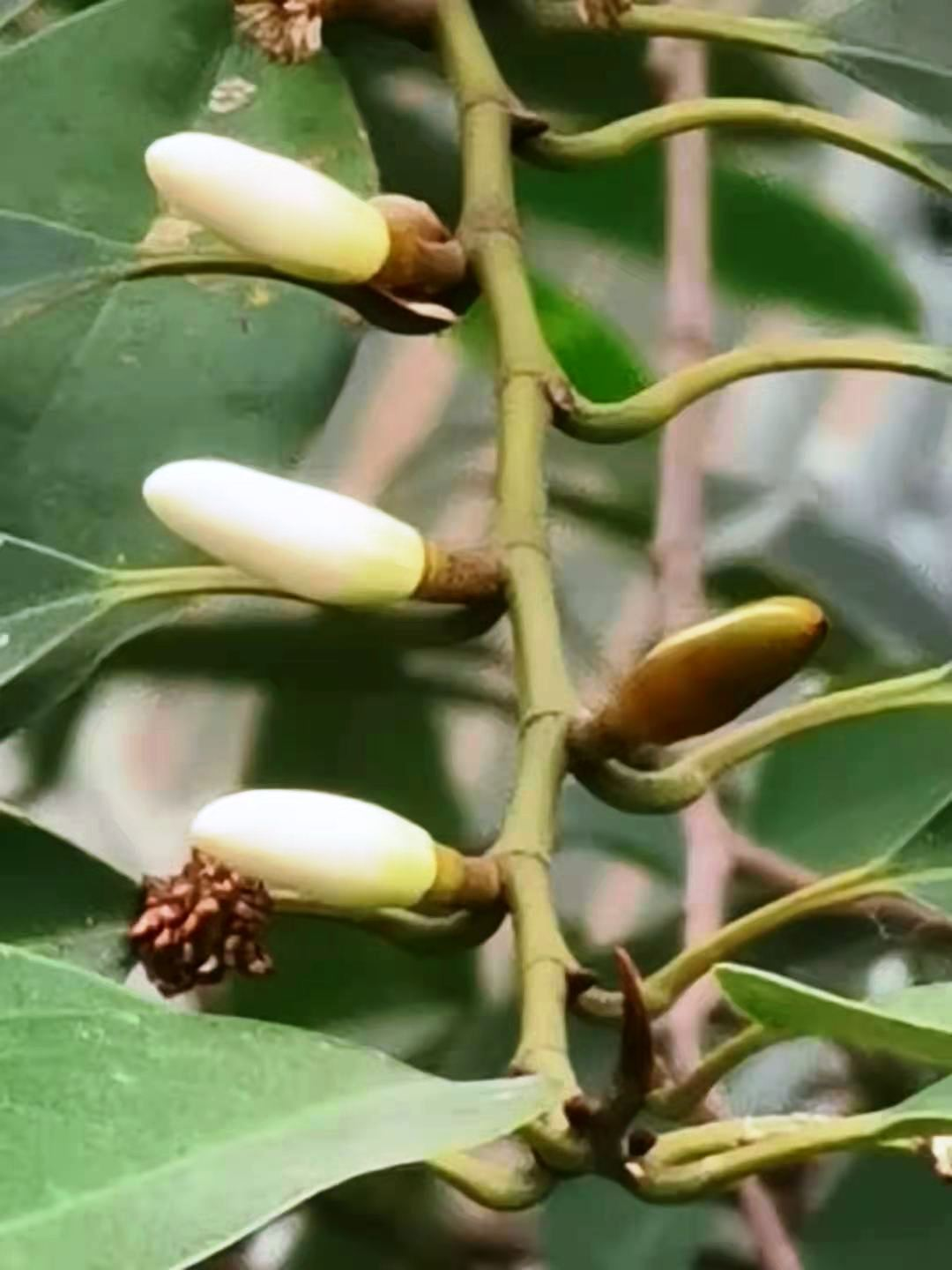
Michelia compressa var. lanyuensis

Michepressine

An aporphine alkaloid contained within Michelia compressa is called michepressine [25454-85-7].
