= Taguma Ishihatake Site =

Archaeological site in Japan

- 田熊石畑遺跡 (Japanese)
- Taguma Ishihatake Site Taguma Ishihatake Site (Japan)
- 33°48′02″N 130°32′14″E
- Type: Settlement ruins
- Periods: Yayoi period
- Location: Munakata, Fukuoka, Japan
- Region: Kyushu

History
- Built: 1st century AD

Site notes
- Elevation: 10 m (33 ft)
- Public access: Yes (archaeological park)
- National Historic Site of Japan

The Taguma Ishihatake Site (田熊石畑遺跡, Taguma Ishihatake iseki) is an archaeological site with the traces of a Yayoi period settlement located on the Taguma neighborhood of the city of Munakata, Fukuoka Prefecture on the island of Kyushu, Japan. The site was designated a National Historic Site in 2010, with the area under protection expanded in 2017.

== Overview ==
The Taguma Ishihatake Site is located in on the left bank of the middle reaches of the Tsuri River, at an elevation of 12 meters. In 1933 a teacher at Fukuoka Prefectural Munakata Girls' High School (currently Fukuoka Prefectural High School), which was located in this area at the time, discovered the ruins, and published an article in the same year in the magazine "Archaeology" (Tokyo Archaeological Association). After World War II, the area became the site of Munakata City Chuo Junior High School, but for many years the lot remained vacant. In 2008, an archaeological excavation found a grave area dating from the first half of the middle Yayoi period, and the traces of a residential area spread out to the north of the cemetery, with pit dwellings, postholes, and prehistoric storage pits. The settlement was surrounded by a ring moat estimated to be approximately 60 meters in diameter. Although there were also remains of buildings from the Kofun period and remains of ditches and wells into the Muromachi period, the main remains are from the late early to mid-Yayoi period.

Unusually, the building ruins are not located within the ring moat, but to the south of the survey area and east of the grave area. However, 170 earthen pots and storage pits were confirmed throughout the survey area. The feature that attracted the most attention were nine burial mounds from the first half of the Middle Yayoi period, six of which were excavated. Grave goods included jade, jasper or glass beads and magatama. At least one bronze weapon (bronze sword, bronze spear, bronze halberd) was unearthed from each of the six excavated graves, for a total of 15 pieces.These bronze weapons are the largest number ever found in a single tomb group from this period, suggesting the importance of this settlement. The unexcavated graves also had a reaction with a metal detector, and there is a high possibility that bronze artifacts were buried there as well. The excavated bronze weapons have been designated National Important Cultural Properties.

At this site, the jar coffin tombs that are characteristic of northern Kyushu are not seen. A small number of pot coffin graves can be seen in the Koga City area to the west of this site, but no pot coffin graves can be seen east of the Aoyagi River, which flows through Koga City, indicating that the boundary of the cultural area is here. Furthermore, the bronze artifacts appear to be related to the San'in region and western Seto Inland Sea, whereas the excavated pottery also shows characteristics of both the Gulf of Hibiki area to the east and the Genkai Sea area to the west, indicating that this site is located at the point of contact between eastern and western Yayoi cultures.

Currently, the site is maintained as an archaeological park, with reconstructions of pit dwellings and a museum. The site is approximately a 15-minute walk from Tōgō Station on the JR Kyushu Kagoshima Main Line.

== See also ==
- List of Historic Sites of Japan (Fukuoka)
