= Akama =

Akama may refer to:

== Places ==
- Akama, a historical district in Munakata, Fukuoka, Japan
- Akama Shrine, a Shinto shrine in Shimonoseki, Yamaguchi Prefecture, Japan
- Akama Station, a train station in Munakata, Fukuoka, Japan

== People ==
- Alberto Akama
- Jiro Akama (born 1968), Japanese politician
- Liz Akama (born 2009), Japanese skateboarder
- Denkichi Akama, a character in the Akira Kurosawa film The Idiot

== See also ==
- Akamas (Turkish: Akama), a promontory in northwest Cyprus
