= Sacred Island of Okinoshima and Associated Sites in the Munakata Region =

UNESCO World Heritage Site
- Location within Japan
- Location: Munakata, Fukuoka Prefecture, Kyushu, Japan
- Criteria: Cultural: (ii)(iii)
- Reference: 1535
- Inscription: 2017 (41st Session)
- Area: 98.93 ha (244.5 acres)
- Buffer zone: 79,363.48 ha (196,111.4 acres)
- Coordinates: 34°14′42″N 130°6′20″E

Sacred Island of Okinoshima and Associated Sites in the Munakata Region (「神宿る島」宗像・沖ノ島と関連遺産群), officially Sacred Island of Okinoshima and Associated Sites in the Munakata Region, is a group of sites in northwest Kyūshū, Japan, that was inscribed on the UNESCO World Heritage List in 2017, under criteria ii and iii.

== Background ==
The three Munakata kami are said in the Kojiki and Nihon Shoki to be daughters of Amaterasu, spawned upon the sun-goddess' consumption of giant swords. Okitsu-Miya on the island of Okinoshima is part of the Shinto shrine complex of Munakata Taisha; no formal shrine buildings were constructed on the island; instead rock piles or yorishiro provided the focus for veneration. Over 80,000 artefacts were ritually deposited at the site from the fourth to the tenth centuries. These have been designated a National Treasure. They include mirrors and bronze dragon-head finials from Wei China; gold rings and horse-trappings similar to those found in Silla tombs in Korea; and fragments of a glass bowl from Sassanian Persia. The Munakata clan (宗像氏), powerful local rulers, controlled the route to the continent and "presided over the rituals". The many kofun or tumuli in the area are believed to be their burial ground.

== Component Sites ==
Site	Municipality	Comments	Image	Coordinates
Okinoshima 沖ノ島; Okinoshima	Munakata	the island's primeval forest is a Natural Monument and the island a Wildlife Protection Area		34°14′48″N 130°06′15″E
Munakata Taisha - Okitsu-Miya 宗像神社境内 沖津宮; Munakata Jinja keidai - Okitsumiya	Munakata	on the island of Okinoshima; Tagori-hime (田心姫神) is enshrined; the precincts of Munakata Taisha are an Historic Site		34°14′29″N 130°06′14″E
Munakata Taisha - Nakatsu-Miya 宗像神社境内 中津宮; Munakata Jinja keidai - Nakatsumiya	Munakata	on the island of Ōshima; Tagitsu-hime (湍津姫神) is enshrined		33°53′49″N 130°25′56″E
Munakata Taisha - Hetsu-Miya 宗像神社境内 辺津宮; Munakata Jinja keidai - Hetsumiya	Munakata	on the mainland of Kyūshū; Ichikishima-hime (市杵島姫神) is enshrined; the ICP honden and haiden date respectively to 1578 and 1590		33°49′52″N 130°30′52″E
Tsuyazaki Tumulus Cluster - Shinbaru-Nuyama Tumulus Cluster 津屋崎古墳群 新原・奴山古墳群; Tsuyazaki kofun-gun - Shinbaru-Nuyama kofun-gun	Fukutsu	On the mainland, five keyhole-shaped tumuli, one square tumulus, and 41 round tumuli within sight of the island of Okinoshima, believed to be the 5th - 6th century graves of the Munakata clan chieftains		33°48′59″N 130°29′16″E

== Original submission ==
The following sites were included in the original nomination, but were excluded from the final inscription:

Site	Municipality	Image	Coordinates
Tsuyazaki Tumulus Cluster - Katsuura Takahara Tumulus Cluster 津屋崎古墳群 勝浦高原古墳群; Tsuyazaki kofun-gun - Katsuura Takahara kofun-gun	Fukutsu		33°50′29″N 130°29′16″E
Tsuyazaki Tumulus Cluster - Katsuura Minenohata Tumulus 津屋崎古墳群 勝浦峯ノ畑古墳; Tsuyazaki kofun-gun - Katsuura Minenohata kofun	Fukutsu		33°50′15″N 130°29′08″E
Tsuyazaki Tumulus Cluster - Katsuura Inoura Tumulus 津屋崎古墳群 勝浦井ノ浦古墳; Tsuyazaki kofun-gun - Katsuura Inoura kofun	Fukutsu		33°50′16″N 130°29′10″E
Tsuyazaki Tumulus Cluster - Yukue Ōtsuka Tumulus 津屋崎古墳群 生家大塚古墳; Tsuyazaki kofun-gun - Yukue Ōtsuka kofun	Fukutsu		33°48′38″N 130°29′02″E
Tsuyazaki Tumulus Cluster - Ōishi Okanotani Tumulus 津屋崎古墳群 大石岡ノ谷古墳群; Tsuyazaki kofun-gun - Ōishi Okanotani kofun	Fukutsu		33°48′15″N 130°29′04″E
Tsuyazaki Tumulus Cluster - Sudata Kaminokuchi Tumulus 津屋崎古墳群 須多田上ノ口古墳; Tsuyazaki kofun-gun - Sudata Kaminokuchi kofun	Fukutsu		33°48′11″N 130°29′01″E
Tsuyazaki Tumulus Cluster - Sudata Amafurijinja Tumulus 津屋崎古墳群 須多田天降天神社古墳; Tsuyazaki kofun-gun - Sudata Amafurijinja kofun	Fukutsu		33°48′12″N 130°28′54″E
Tsuyazaki Tumulus Cluster - Sudata Shimonokuchi Tumulus 津屋崎古墳群 須多田下ノ口古墳; Tsuyazaki kofun-gun - Sudata Shimonokuchi kofun	Fukutsu		33°48′10″N 130°28′54″E
Tsuyazaki Tumulus Cluster - Sudata Misotsuka Tumulus 津屋崎古墳群 須多田ミソ塚古墳; Tsuyazaki kofun-gun - Sudata Misotsuka kofun	Fukutsu		33°48′09″N 130°28′50″E
Tsuyazaki Tumulus Cluster - Sudata Nitatsuka Tumulus 津屋崎古墳群 須多田ニタ塚古墳; Tsuyazaki kofun-gun - Sudata Nitatsuka kofun	Fukutsu		33°48′16″N 130°28′42″E
Tsuyazaki Tumulus Cluster - Araji Tsurugizuka Tumulus 津屋崎古墳群 在自剣塚古墳; Tsuyazaki kofun-gun - Araji Tsurugizuka kofun	Fukutsu		33°47′47″N 130°29′10″E
Tsuyazaki Tumulus Cluster - Miyajidake Tumulus 津屋崎古墳群 宮地嶽古墳; Tsuyazaki kofun-gun - Miyajidake kofun	Fukutsu		33°46′50″N 130°29′18″E
Tsuyazaki Tumulus Cluster - Miyaji Idenokami Tumulus 津屋崎古墳群 宮司井手ノ上古墳; Tsuyazaki kofun-gun - Miyaji Idenokami kofun	Fukutsu		33°46′43″N 130°29′21″E
Tsuyazaki Tumulus Cluster - Tebika Namikirifudō Tumulus 津屋崎古墳群 手光波切不動古墳; Tsuyazaki kofun-gun - Tebika Namikirifudō kofun	Fukutsu		33°46′18″N 130°29′59″E
Tsuyazaki Tumulus Cluster - Tebika Yunoura Tumulus Cluster 津屋崎古墳群 手光湯ノ浦古墳群; Tsuyazaki kofun-gun - Tebika Yunoura kofun	Fukutsu		33°46′43″N 130°29′31″E
Sakurakyō Tumulus 桜京古墳; Sakurakyō kofun	Munakata		33°50′38″N 130°29′43″E
Tōgō Takatsuka Tumulus 東郷高塚古墳; Tōgō Takatsuka kofun	Munakata		33°47′56″N 130°32′26″E

== See also ==
- List of National Treasures of Japan (archaeological materials)
- Yorishiro
- World Heritage Sites in Japan
