= Ebitsu Station =

Railway station in Okagaki, Fukuoka Prefecture, Japan

JA 16 Ebitsu Station 海老津駅
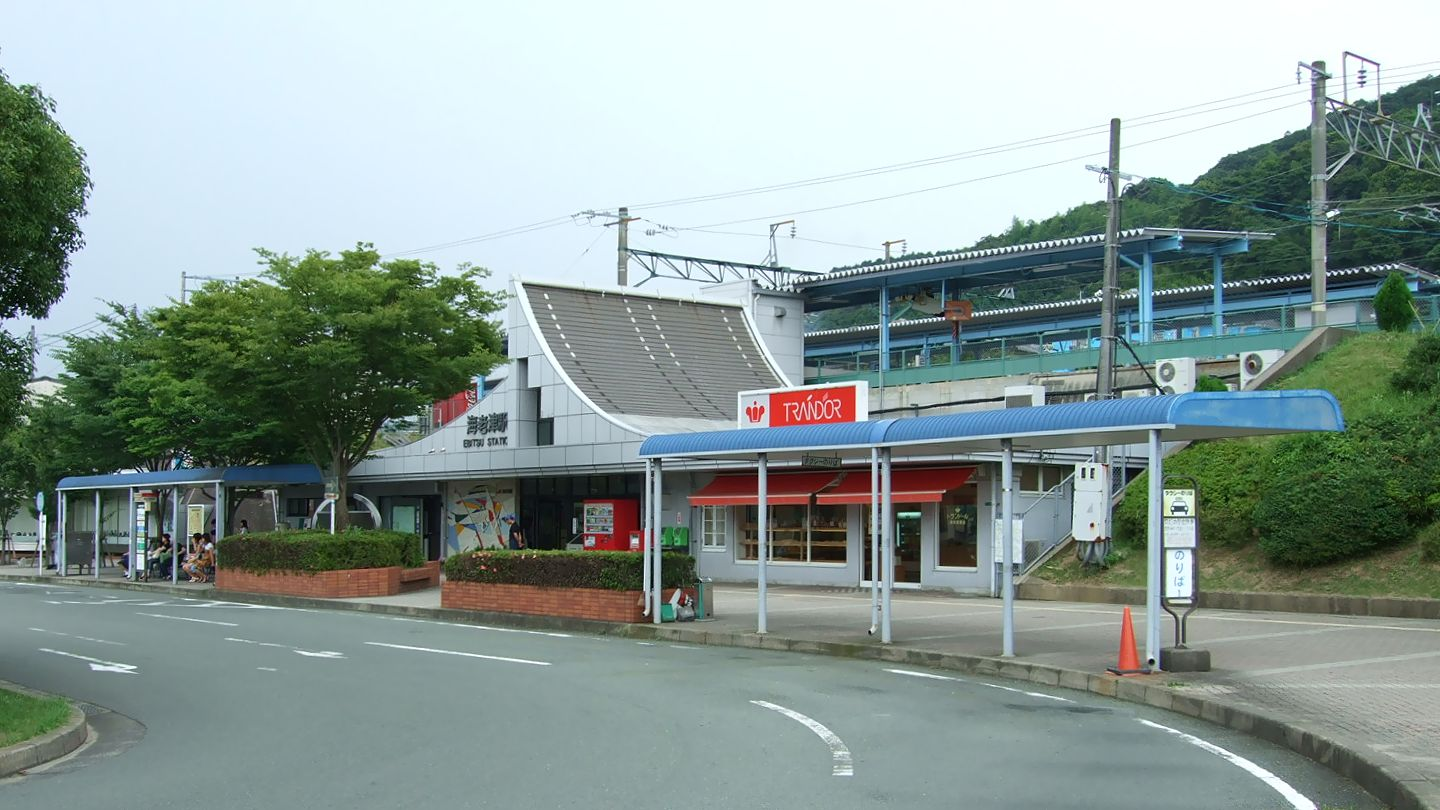
- Ebitsu Station in 2008

General information
- Location: 1 Ebitsu Ekimae, Okagaki-machi, Onga-gun, Fukuoka-ken 811-4236; Japan
- Coordinates: 33°50′24″N 130°37′27″E
- Operator: JR Kyushu
- Line: JB Kagoshima Main Line
- Distance: 39.4 km (24.5 mi) from Mojikō
- Platforms: 1 side + 1 island platforms
- Tracks: 3 + 1 passing loop + 1 siding

Construction
- Structure type: Embankment

Other information
- Status: Staffed (Midori no Madoguchi )
- Website: Official website

History
- Opened: 6 February 1910

Passengers
- FY2020: 2,842 daily
- Rank: 55th (among JR Kyushu stations)

Services
Preceding station	JR Kyushu	Following station
Kyōikudaimae towards Kagoshima	Kagoshima Main Line	Ongagawa towards Mojikō
Location
- Location within Fukuoka Prefecture Location within Japan

Ebitsu Station (海老津駅, Ebitsu-eki) is a passenger railway station located in the town of Okagaki, Fukuoka Prefecture, Japan. It is operated by JR Kyushu.

== Lines ==
The station is served by the Kagoshima Main Line and is located 39.4 km (24.5 mi) from the starting point of the line at Mojikō.

== Layout ==
The station consists of a side platform and an island platform on an embankment serving three tracks. The station building is located near the side platform (north side of the station) and is connected with the island platform by an underground passage. A passing loop designated as track 4 runs beyond track/platform 3 and a siding branches of it. The station has a Midori no Madoguchi staffed ticket office.

=== Platforms ===
1, 2	■ JB Kagoshima Main Line	for Shimonoseki and Kokura
2, 3	■ JB Kagoshima Main Line	for Akama and Hakata

== History ==
The station was opened by Japanese Government Railways on 6 February 1910 as an added station on the existing Kagoshima Main Line track. With the privatization of the successor Japanese National Railways, on 1 April 1987, JR Kyushu took over control of the station.

== Passenger statistics ==
In fiscal 2020, the station was used by an average of 2,842 passengers daily (boarding passengers only), and it ranked 55th among the busiest stations of JR Kyushu.

== Surrounding area ==
- Okagaki Town Hall Information Plaza Hito-no-Eki

== See also ==
- List of railway stations in Japan
