= Kyōikudai-mae Station =

Railway station in Munakata, Fukuoka Prefecture, Japan

JA 15 Kyōikudai-mae Station 教育大前駅
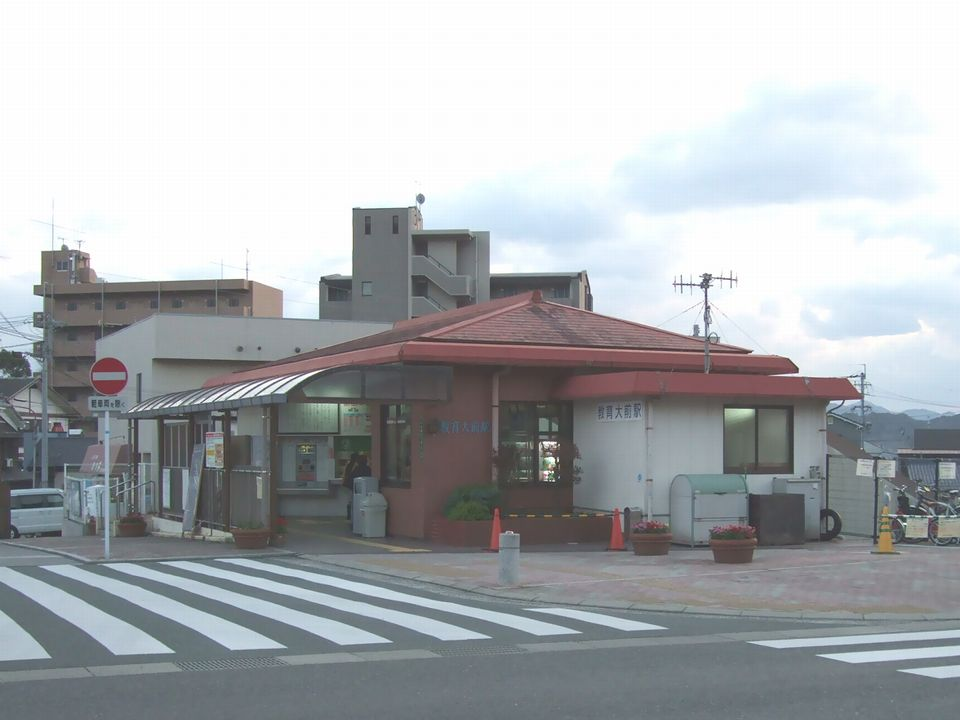
- Kyōikudai-mae Station in 2007

General information
- Location: 6-chōme-3 Akama, Munakata-shi, Fukuoka-ken 811-4146; Japan
- Coordinates: 33°48′30″N 130°35′25″E
- Operator: JR Kyushu
- Line: JA Kagoshima Main Line
- Distance: 44.6 km from Mojikō
- Platforms: 2 side platforms
- Tracks: 2

Construction
- Structure type: At grade

Other information
- Status: Staffed
- Website: Official website

History
- Opened: 13 March 1988

Passengers
- FY2020: 1625
- Rank: 88th (among JR Kyushu stations)

Services
Preceding station	JR Kyushu	Following station
Akama towards Kagoshima	Kagoshima Main Line	Ebitsu towards Mojikō
Location
- Location within Fukuoka Prefecture Location within Japan

Kyōikudai-mae Station (教育大前駅, Kyōikudaimae-eki) is a passenger railway station located in the city of Munakata, Fukuoka Prefecture, Japan. It is operated by JR Kyushu. It is the nearest station to the Fukuoka University of Education (Fukuoka Kyoiku Daigaku) hence the station name which means literally "in front of the University of Education."

== Lines ==
The station is served by the Kagoshima Main Line and is located 44.6 km from the start of the line at Mojikō.

== Layout ==
The station consists of two opposed side platforms serving two tracks. The railroad tracks run through a cut-through, and a station building is attached to the road bridge built above it. The station is staffed.

=== Platforms ===
1	■ JA Kagoshima Main Line	for Hakata and Kurume
2	■ JA Kagoshima Main Line	for Kokura and Shimonoseki

== History ==
The station was opened by JR Kyushu on 13 March 1988 as an added station on the existing Kagoshima Main Line track.

== Passenger statistics ==
In fiscal 2020, the station was used by an average of 1625 passengers daily (boarding passengers only), and it ranked 88th among the busiest stations of JR Kyushu.

== Surrounding area ==
- Fukuoka University of Education
- Munakata City Shiroyama Junior High School

== See also ==
- List of railway stations in Japan
