= Okinoshima (Fukuoka) =

Native name: 沖ノ島
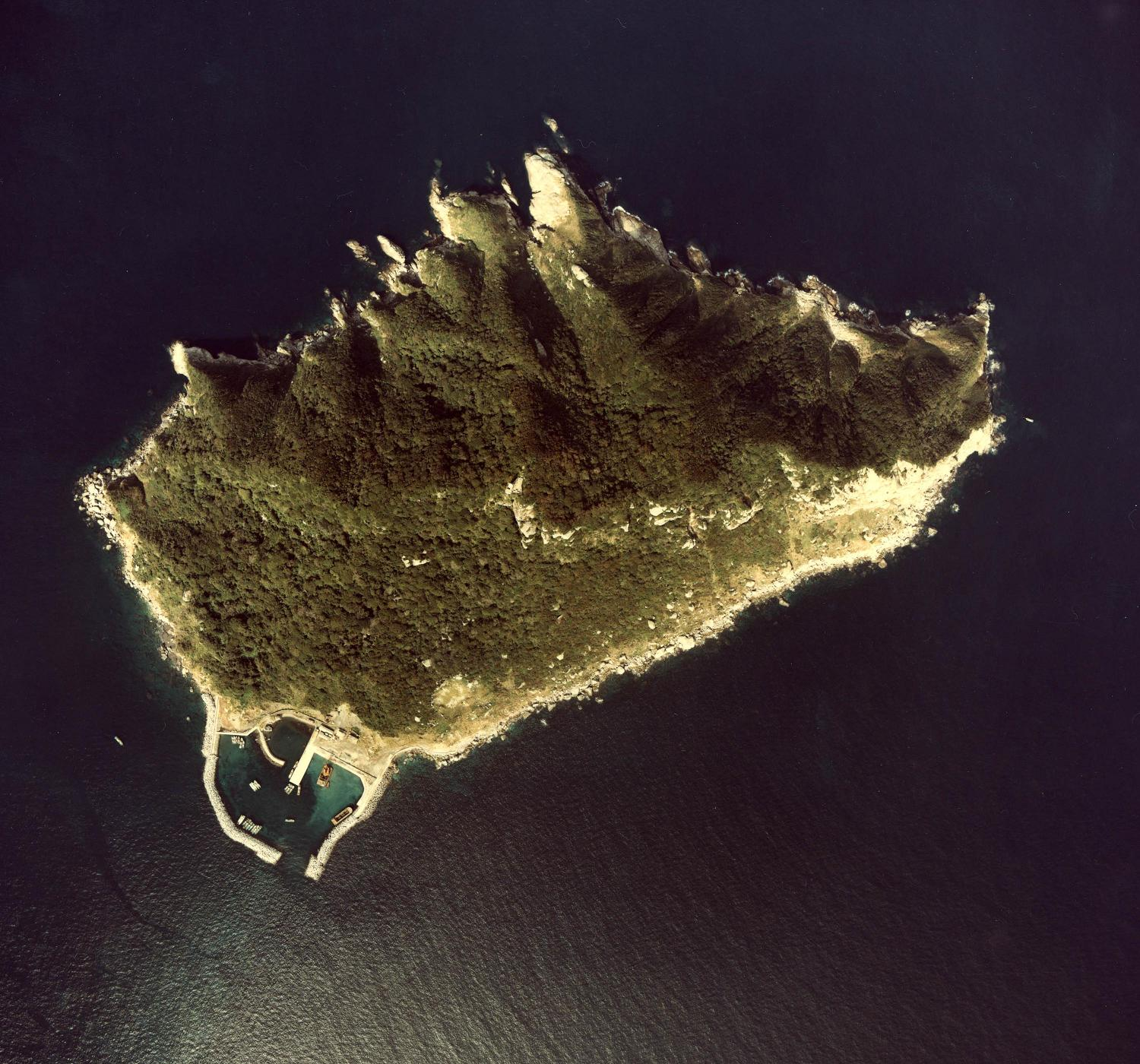

- Location within Japan

Geography
- Location: Sea of Japan; East China Sea
- Coordinates: 34°14′N 130°6′E
- Archipelago: Japanese archipelago

Administration
- Japan
- Region: Kyushu
- Prefecture: Fukuoka Prefecture
- City: Munakata, Fukuoka

Demographics
- Population: 1
- Ethnic groups: Japanese

UNESCO World Heritage Site
- Part of: Sacred Island of Okinoshima and Associated Sites in the Munakata Region
- Criteria: Cultural: (ii), (iii)
- Reference: 1535-001
- Inscription: 2017 (41st Session)
- Area: 68.38 ha (169.0 acres)

Okinoshima (沖ノ島, Okinoshima) is an island off the coast of Munakata, Fukuoka, Japan. It is considered sacred land by the local Munakata Taisha. The island's population consists of a single employee of the shrine. He is one of about two dozen Shinto priests who spend 10-day intervals on the island, praying and guarding against intruders.

The entire island is considered a shinto kami, and the island is off limits to women. One proposed reason is that Shinto views blood as impure and menstruation would desecrate the island. For centuries, only 200 men were allowed on the island on one day each year after they had ritually purified themselves in the surrounding sea.

The island covers area of 97 ha (240 acres) and has maximum elevation of approximately 244 m (801 ft).

== Munakata Taisha Okitsu shrine ==
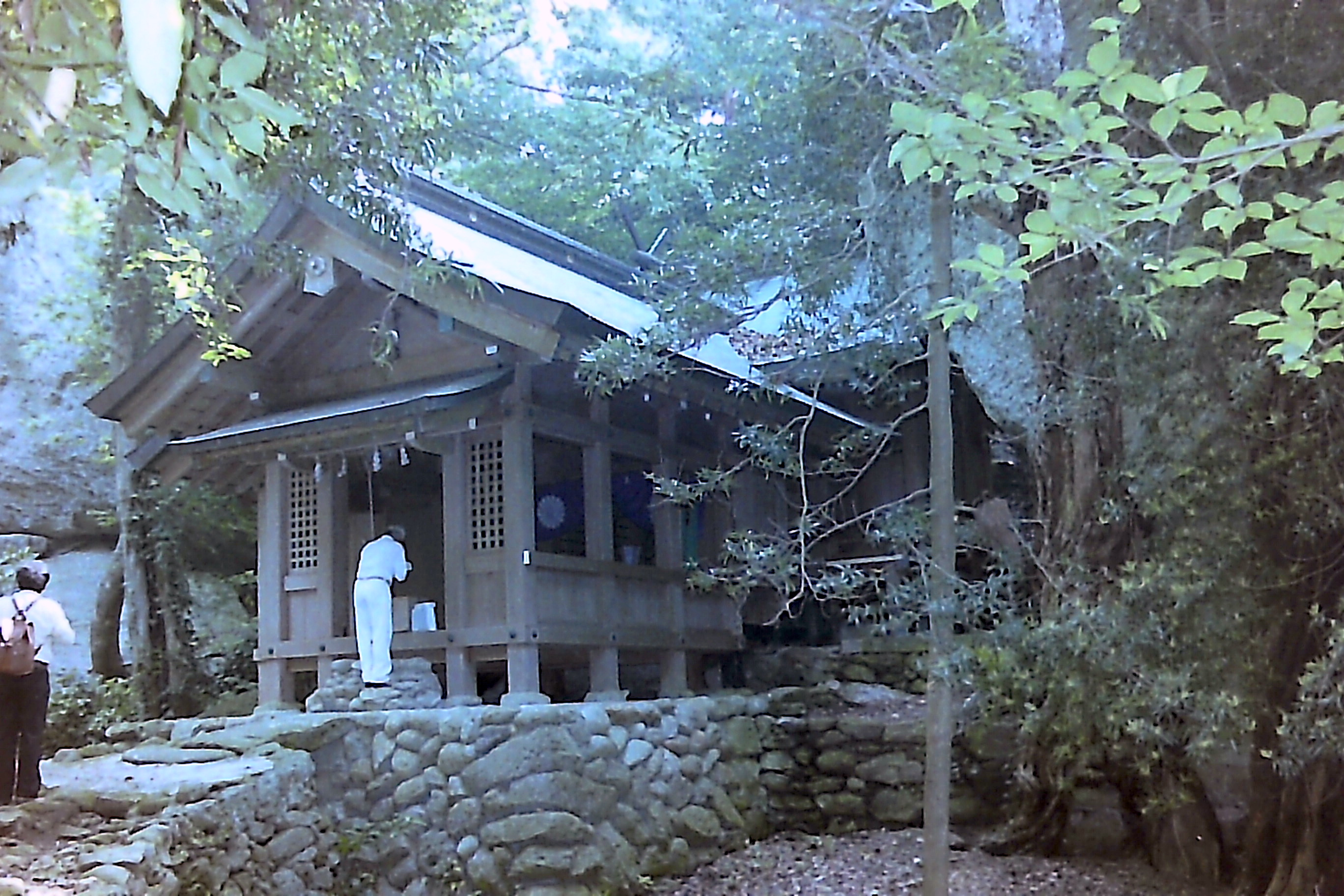
Okitsu-gū

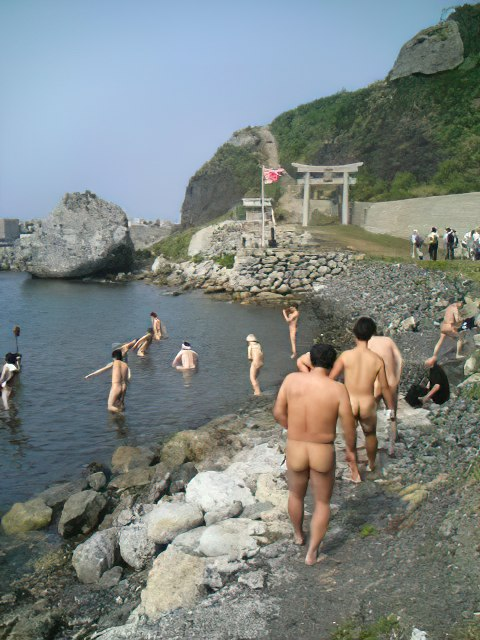
Ritual purification is mandatory to enter the island

The Okitsu-gū shrine is located at the southwestern portion of Okinoshima. It was established in the mid 17th-century. Prior to the shrine's establishment as a sacred natural site, the surrounding site served as a location for the worship of the kami. The shrine has been maintained in relatively the same condition since the Shōwa period, prior to which it had undergone repair and rebuilding several times.

== Legend ==
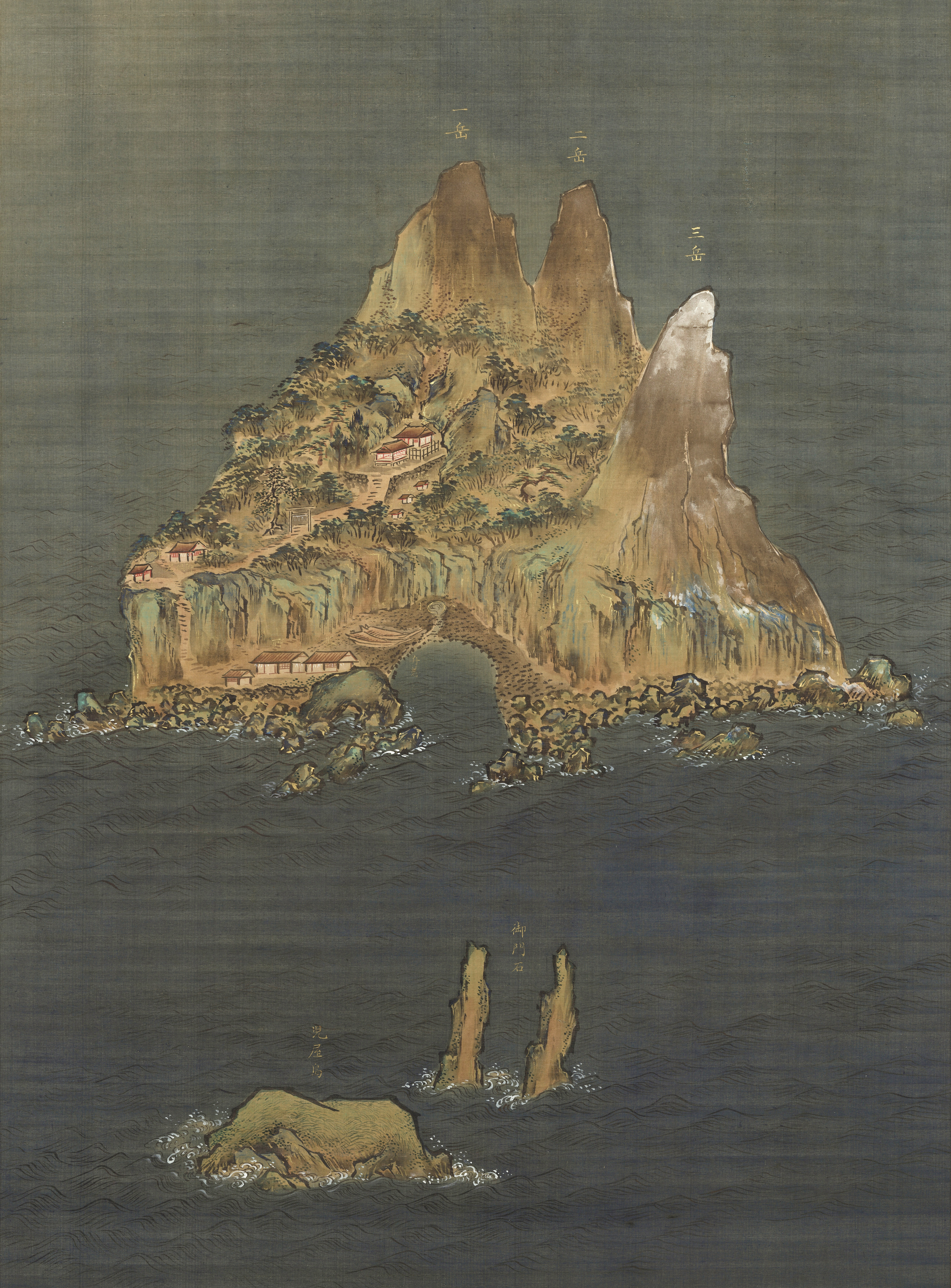
Painting of Okinoshima, by Kuroda Tsunamasa, 1689-1711

Japan's two oldest historical documents, the Kojiki and the Nihon Shoki, include references to Okinoshima. Per the Kojiki and Nihon Shoki, When Amaterasu Omikami and Susanoo no Mikoto made a vow, Amaterasu bit into pieces Susanoo's sword, and the three Munakata goddesses were born from the pieces that blew out. She then sent them to Japan where they were by the Munakata clan. The Munakata Taisha, a collection of three shrines in Munakata, is dedicated to the goddesses. Locals continue to worship them for protection across the sea. Likewise, the island itself is considered a deity. The mainland has several Okinoshima worship sites as travel to the island is restricted.

Okinoshima has several traditions and taboos involving conduct both on and off the island. Ritual purification must be performed by undressing and bathing in the ocean. Nothing, even a blade of grass, may be removed from the island. No one may speak of what they have seen or heard during their stay (oiwazu-no-shima お言わずの島). Women are not allowed to set foot on the island (nyonin kinsei 女人禁制). The only men permitted on the island are priests, researchers, military, and the media. Fishermen limit themselves to the port and do not enter the interior. Prior to receiving UNESCO World Heritage status in 2017, two hundred people (all-male) would visit the island once a year to celebrate the 1905 victory at the battle of Tsushima situated nearby. Following the site's heritage inscription, this yearly event has since been canceled.

These restrictions contribute to Okinoshima's reputation as a place of mystery. Other names for the island include “Island where gods dwell,” “Shosoin Treasury of the sea,” “Island of mystery,” and “The Unspoken One.” Archeological evidence dates religious rituals since the 4th century. Numerous iwakura (sacred rocks) from that time remain intact. Over 80,000 artifacts have been unearthed, which are now considered national treasures. The sacred view of Okinoshima and various taboos and prohibitions may have deterred travel to the island and preserved the artifacts.

The island's deity was said to guard a popular trade route to Korea. In exchange for safe passage, fishermen provided offerings that included swords, flat-iron ingots, elaborate mirrors and bronze dragon heads. The offerings were concealed underneath stones or scattered between boulders.

In the 1600s, a Christian feudal lord, Kuroda Nagamasa, collected the offerings and put them in a tower of his castle. According to legend, the tower began to shake, bright objects streaked through the sky, and diseases plagued Nagamasa's people. Nagamasa returned the objects to the island, and the unsettling events stopped.

Today, many of the treasures are on display in the Munakata shrine on Kyushu.

== UNESCO status ==
In 2009, the island was submitted for future inscription on the UNESCO World Heritage List as part of the serial nomination Okinoshima Island and Related Sites in Munakata Region. The island gained status as a UNESCO World Heritage site on July 9, 2017.

Local residents had expressed their worry that the island's inclusion on the UNESCO list would cause an increase of tourism that would threaten its sacredness. Takayuki Ashizu, the chief priest at Munakata Taisha, said that regardless whether or not Okinoshima is added to the UNESCO cultural heritage list, they would not open it to the public because "people shouldn't visit out of curiosity."

== Important Bird Area ==
The island, along with the nearby reef islet of Koyajima, have been recognised as an Important Bird Area (IBA) by BirdLife International because they support populations of Japanese wood pigeons, streaked shearwaters, Japanese murrelets and Pleske's grasshopper warblers.

== See also ==
- List of National Treasures of Japan (archaeological materials)
- World Heritage Sites in Japan
- Mount Athos
