= Fukuma Station =

Railway station in Fukutsu, Fukuoka Prefecture, Japan

JA 11 Fukuma Station 福間駅
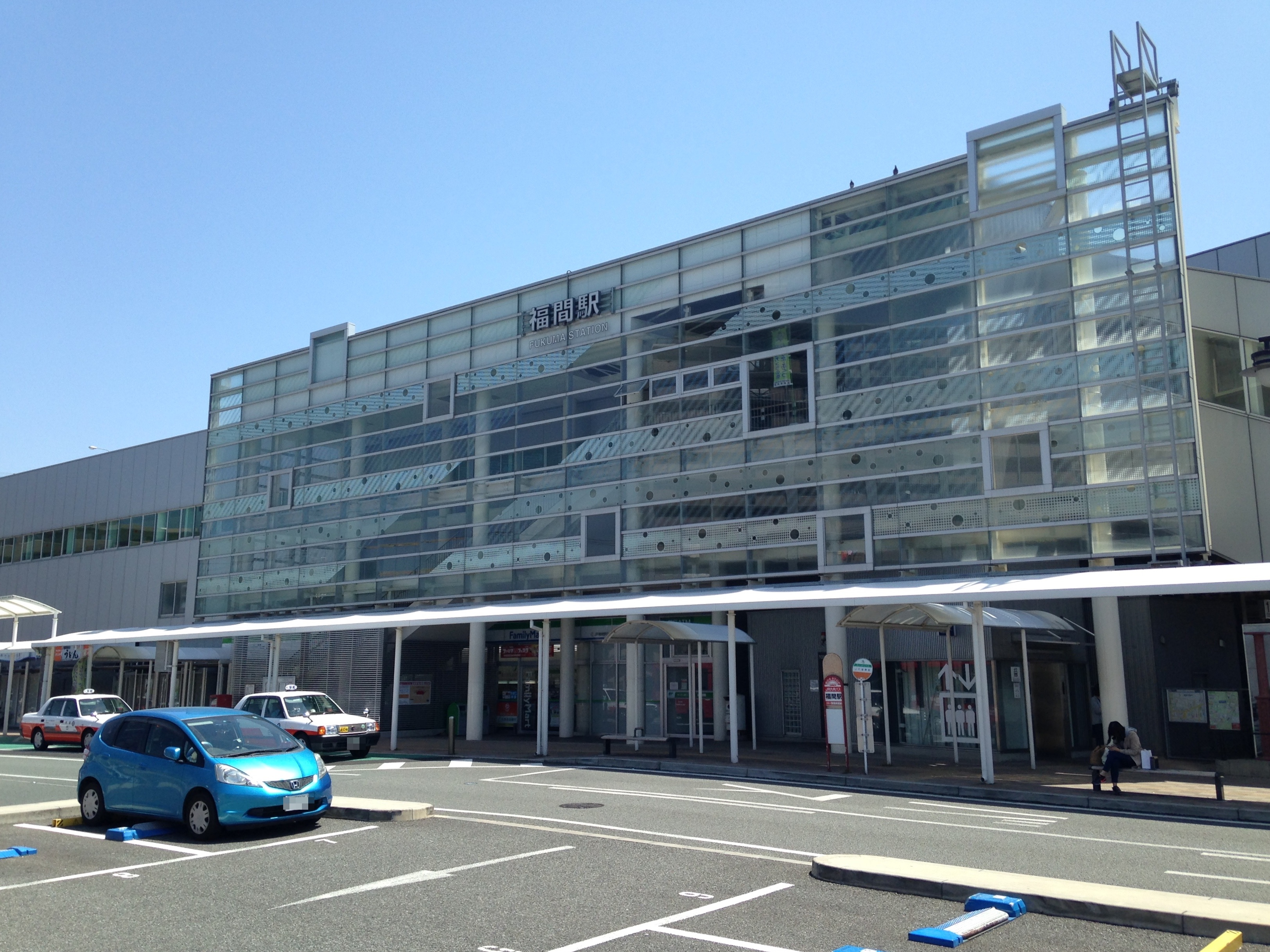
- Fukuma Station in 2015

General information
- Location: 3-chōme-1 Chūō, Fukutsu-shi, Fukuoka-ken 811-3217; Japan
- Coordinates: 33°45′50″N 130°29′14″E
- Operator: JR Kyushu
- Line: JA Kagoshima Main Line
- Distance: 56.6 km from Mojikō
- Platforms: 1 side + 2 island platforms
- Tracks: 5 + 1 siding

Construction
- Structure type: At grade

Other information
- Status: Staffed ( Midori no Madoguchi )
- Website: Official website

History
- Opened: 28 September 1890

Passengers
- FY2020: 7305
- Rank: 15th (among JR Kyushu stations)

Services
Preceding station	JR Kyushu	Following station
Chidori towards Kagoshima	Kagoshima Main Line	Higashi-Fukuma towards Mojikō
Location
- Location within Fukuoka Prefecture Location within Japan

Fukuma Station (福間駅, Fukuma-eki) is a passenger railway station located in the city of Fukutsu, Fukuoka Prefecture, Japan. It is operated by JR Kyushu.

== Lines ==
The station is served by the Kagoshima Main Line and is located 56.6 km from the starting point of the line at Mojikō.

== Layout ==
The station consists of a side platform and two island platforms serving five tracks. The platforms are connected by an elevated station building, which has a Midori no Madoguchi staffed ticket office. A siding branches off track 1.

=== Platforms ===
1, 2	■ JA Kagoshima Main Line	for Orio and Kokura
3, 4, 5	■ JA Kagoshima Main Line	for Fukkōdai-mae, Kurume and Hakata

== History ==
The privately run Kyushu Railway had begun laying down its network on Kyushu in 1889 and by 1890 had a stretch of track from Hakata southwards to Kurume. The track was extended northwards from Hakata to Akama by 28 September 1890, with Fukuma being opened on the same day as an intermediate station. When the Kyushu Railway was nationalized on 1 July 1907, Japanese Government Railways (JGR) took over control of the station. On 12 October 1909, the station became part of the Hitoyoshi Main Line and then on 21 November 1909, part of the Kagoshima Main Line. With the privatization of Japanese National Railways (JNR), the successor of JGR, on 1 April 1987, JR Kyushu took over control of the station.

== Passenger statistics ==
In fiscal 2020, the station was used by an average of 7305 passengers daily (boarding passengers only), and it ranked 15th among the busiest stations of JR Kyushu.

== Surrounding area ==
- Fukutsu City Hall Fukuma Government Building (former Fukuma Town Hall)

== See also ==
- List of railway stations in Japan
