= Higashi-Fukuma Station =

Railway station in Fukutsu, Fukuoka Prefecture, Japan

JA 12 Higashi-Fukuma Station 東福間駅
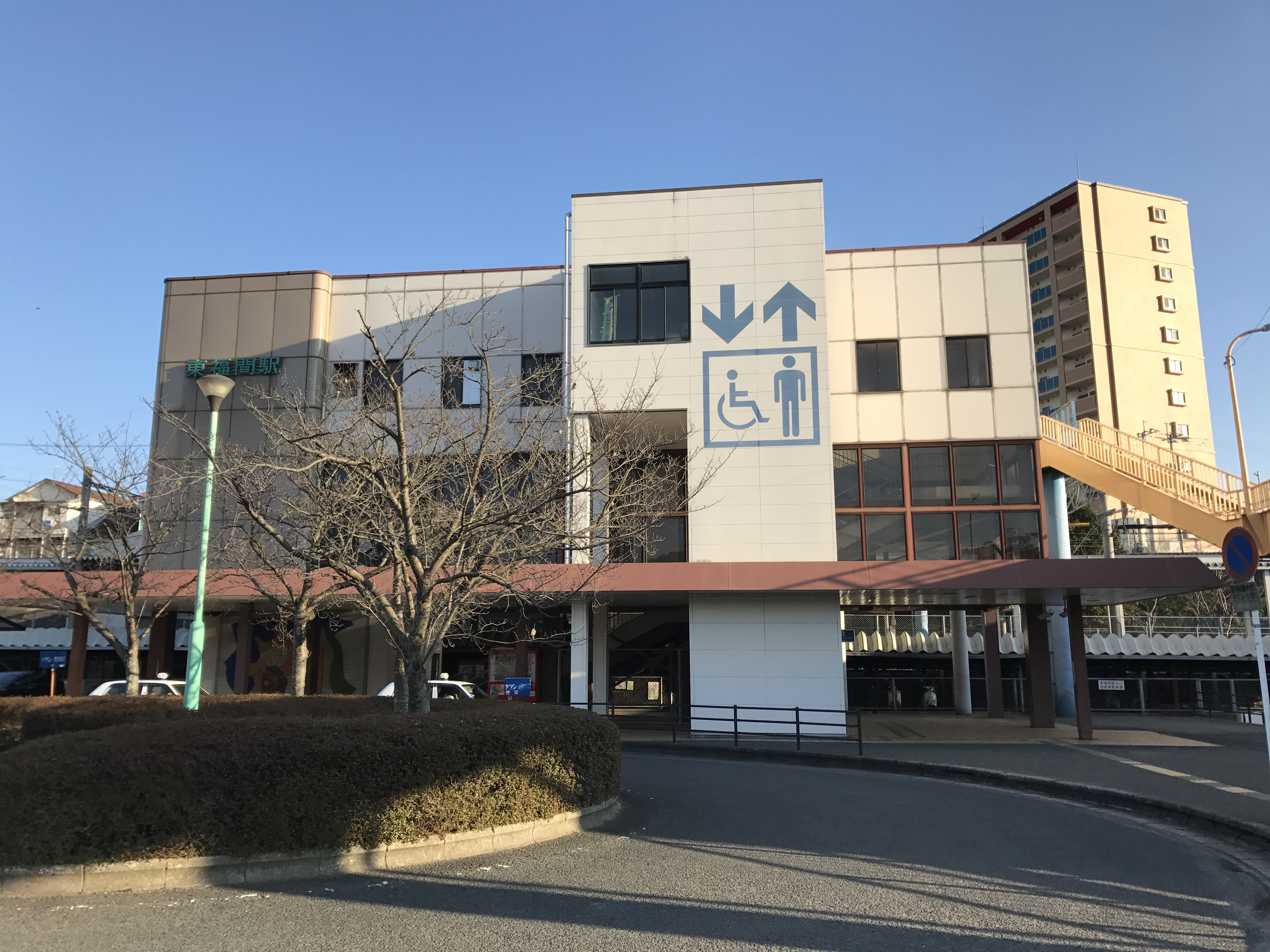
- Higashi-Fukuma Station in 2017

General information
- Location: 1-chōme-1 Wakakidai, Fukutsu-shi, Fukuoka-ken 811-3225; Japan
- Coordinates: 33°46′26″N 130°30′41″E
- Operator: JR Kyushu
- Line: JA Kagoshima Main Line
- Distance: 53.9 km from Mojikō
- Platforms: 2 side platforms
- Tracks: 2

Construction
- Structure type: At grade

Other information
- Website: Official website

History
- Opened: 2 October 1978

Passengers
- FY2020: 2033
- Rank: 69th (among JR Kyushu stations)

Services
Preceding station	JR Kyushu	Following station
Fukuma towards Kagoshima	Kagoshima Main Line	Tōgō towards Mojikō
Location
- Location within Fukuoka Prefecture Location within Japan

Higashi-Fukuma Station (東福間駅, Higashi-Fukuma-eki) is a passenger railway station located in the city of Fukutsu, Fukuoka Prefecture, Japan. It is operated by JR Kyushu.

== Lines ==
The station is served by the Kagoshima Main Line and is located 53.9 km from the starting point of the line at Mojikō.

== Layout ==
The station consists of two opposed side platforms serving two tracks. The platforms are connected by an elevated station building, which is staffed.

=== Platforms ===
1	■ JA Kagoshima Main Line	for Orio and Kokura
2	■ JA Kagoshima Main Line	for Kurume and Hakata

== History ==
The station was opened by Japanese National Railways (JNR) on 2 October 1978 as an added station on the existing Kagoshima Main Line track. With the privatization of JNR on 1 April 1987, JR Kyushu took over control of the station.

== Passenger statistics ==
In fiscal 2020, the station was used by an average of 2033 passengers daily (boarding passengers only), and it ranked 69th among the busiest stations of JR Kyushu.

== Surrounding area ==
- Higashifukuma housing complex
- Fukutsu City Jingo Elementary School
- Tokyu Fukuma New Town Wakagidai
- Fukutsu City Jingo Higashi Elementary School

== See also ==
- List of railway stations in Japan
