= Munakata Taisha =

Shinto shrines in Japan

Munakata Taisha 宗像大社
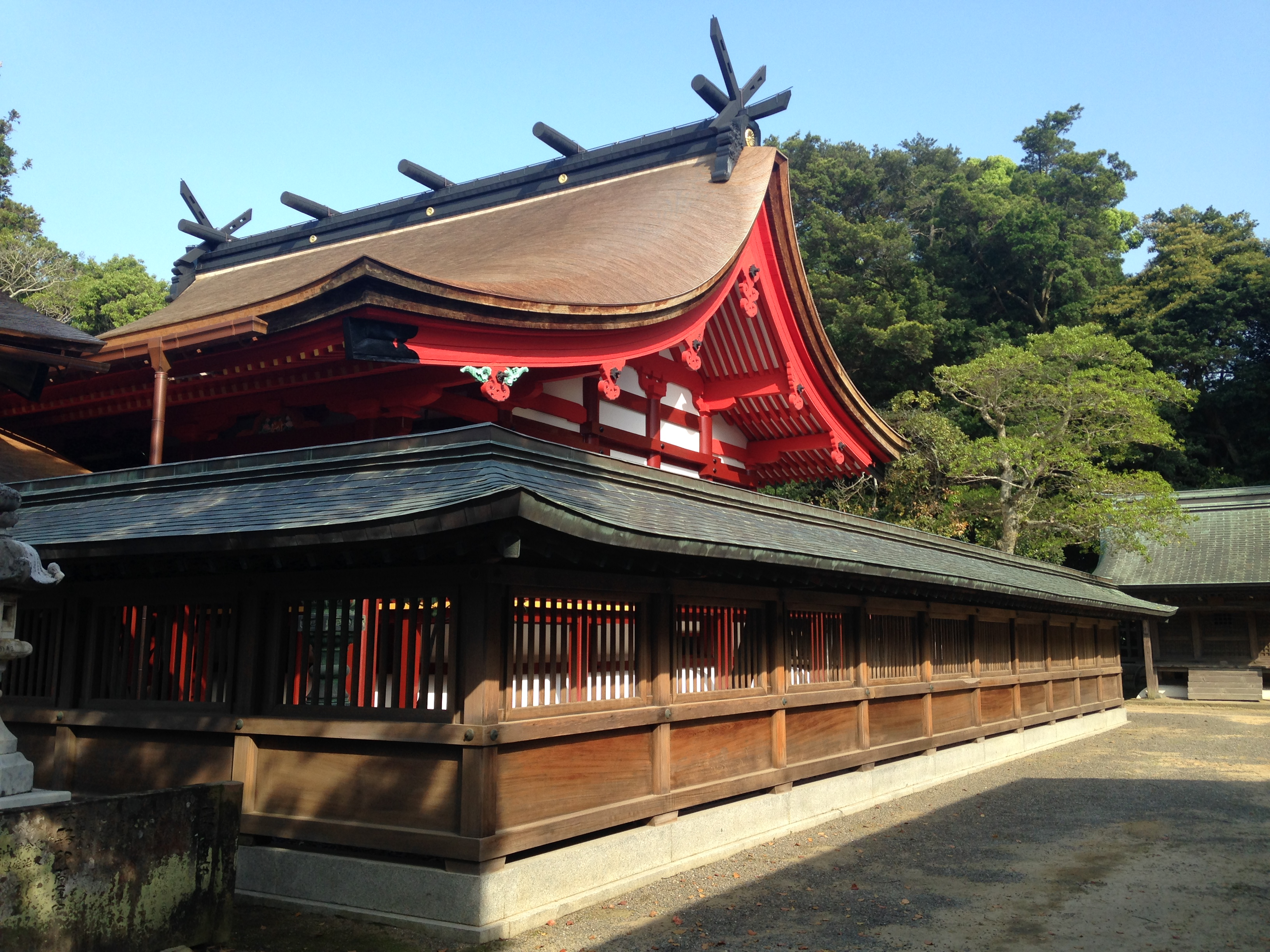
- Hetsu-no-Miya Honden of 1578 (ICP)

- Location within Japan

Religion
- Affiliation: Shinto
- Deity: Ichikishima Hime-no-Kami; Tagitsu Hime-no-Kami; Tagori Hime-no-Kami
- Type: Munakata Shrine

Location
- Location: 2331, Tashima, Munakata-shi, Fukuoka-ken 811-3505; 1811, Nii Ōshima, Munakata-shi, Fukuoka-ken 811-3701
- Coordinates: 33°49′53″N 130°30′50″E

Architecture
- UNESCO World Heritage Site
- Type: Cultural
- Criteria: ii, iii
- Designated: 2017
- Reference no.: 1535
- National Treasure of Japan

Website
- Official website
- Glossary of Shinto Important Cultural Property National Historic Site of Japan Munakata Taisha

Munakata Taisha (宗像大社) is the collective name for three Shinto shrines located in the city of Munakata, northern Fukuoka Prefecture, Japan. It is the head of the approximately 6,000 Munakata shrines all over the country. Although the name Munakata Taisha refers to all three shrines—Hetsu-gū, Nakatsu-gū and Okitsu-gū—it is commonly used to refer to Hetsu-gū alone. Hetsumiya is located in Tajima, Munakata City, and is also known locally as "Tajima-sama." Chikuzen-Oshima also houses the Okitsumiya remote worship site (Etsumiya). Nakatsumiya, 11 km from Hetsumiya, and Okitsumiya, 49 km away, are all located in a straight line on a map. One of Japan's oldest shrines, with its history recorded in the Kojiki and Nihon Shoki, it has served as a maritime route for politics, economics, and culture between the Asian continent and Korean peninsula since ancient times. While worshipped since ancient times as the god of maritime safety, today it is worshipped not only at sea but also on all roads, including land and traffic safety. Munakata Taisha is also home to many Japanese treasures. Hetsu-gū's honden (main shrine) and haiden (main prayer hall) are both designated Important Cultural Properties and the precincts are a Historic Site. The Shinpō-kan (神寶館), the shrine's treasure hall located on the east corner of Hetsu-gū's grounds, houses many important relics including six National Treasures of Japan. Over 120,000 artifacts housed in the Shinpō-kan were unearthed on Okinoshima.

== Enshrined kami ==
The kami enshrined at Munakata Taisha is:

- three Munakata goddesses (宗像三女神, Munakata-sanjojin). These kami are believed to be daughters of the goddess Amaterasu, the ancestress of the imperial family or to be the daughters of Susanoo, who has also been worshipped there for many years as the god of mariners, and he has come to be worshipped as the god of traffic safety on land as well.

== Three shrines ==
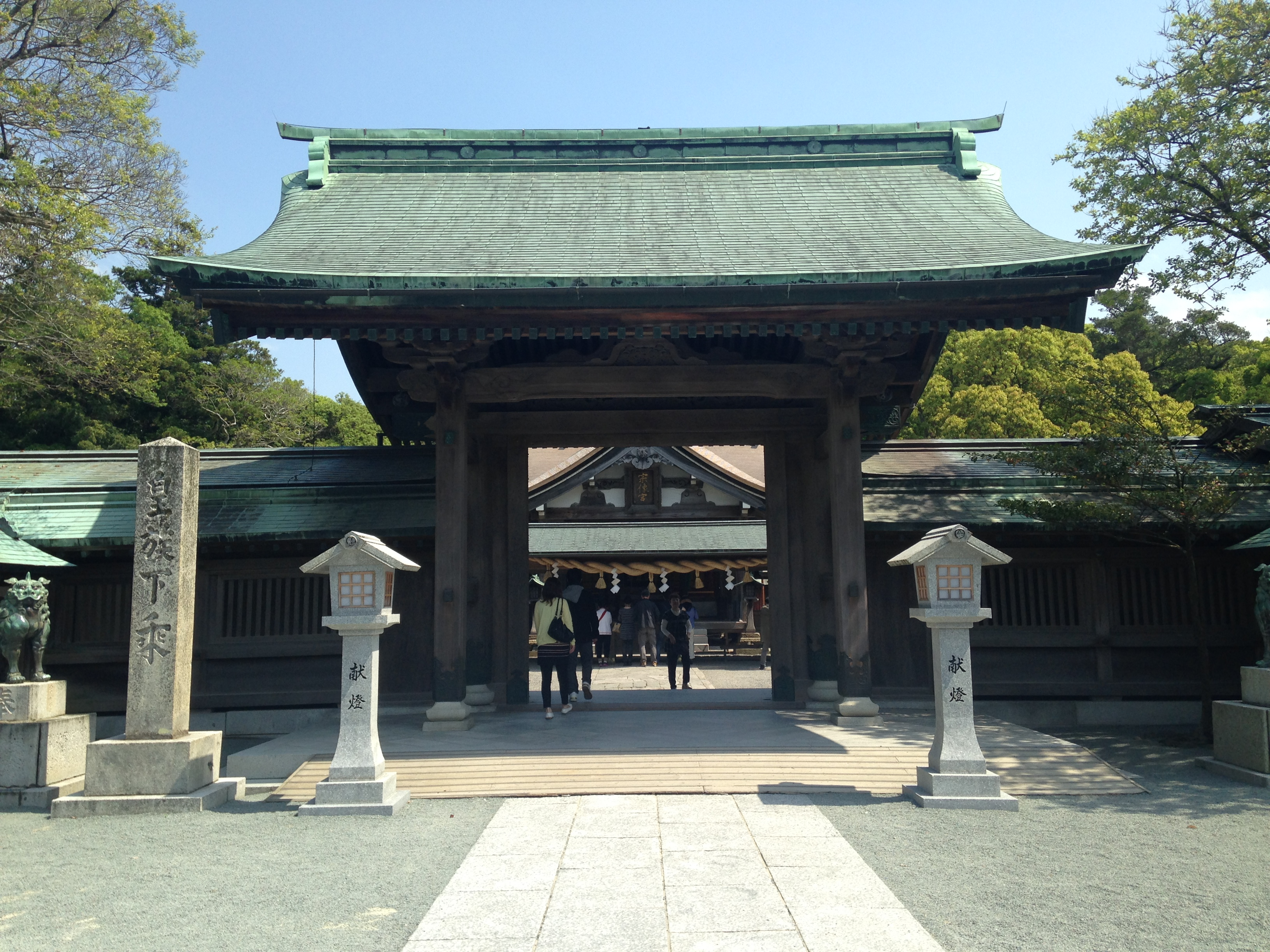
Gate of Hetsu-no-miya

All three shrines are located in Fukuoka Prefecture, yet they are all on separate islands. The main shrine, Hetsu-gū, is located on the mainland of Kyūshū. Nakatsu-gū is established at the foot of Mt. Mitake on the island of Ōshima off the west coast of Kyūshū. The final shrine, Okitsu-gū, is on the island of Okinoshima located in the middle of the Genkai Sea. The shrine occupies the entire island, therefore women are not allowed to set foot on the island and men must perform a purification ceremony before landing.

In 2009 the three shrines were submitted for future inscription on the UNESCO World Heritage List as part of the serial nomination Sacred Island of Okinoshima and Associated Sites in the Munakata Region.

In July, 2017 Japan's Okinoshima Island gained UNESCO World Heritage Site status.

Shrine Name	Enshrined Deity	Island Location	Coordinates
Hetsu-gū (辺津宮)	Ichikishimahime (市杵島姫神)	Kyūshū	33°49′53″N 130°30′50″E
Nakatsu-gū (中津宮)	Tagitsuhime (湍津姫神)	Ōshima	33°53′49″N 130°25′56″E
Okitsu-gū (沖津宮)	Takiribime (田心姫神)	Okinoshima	34°14′33″N 130°6′14″E

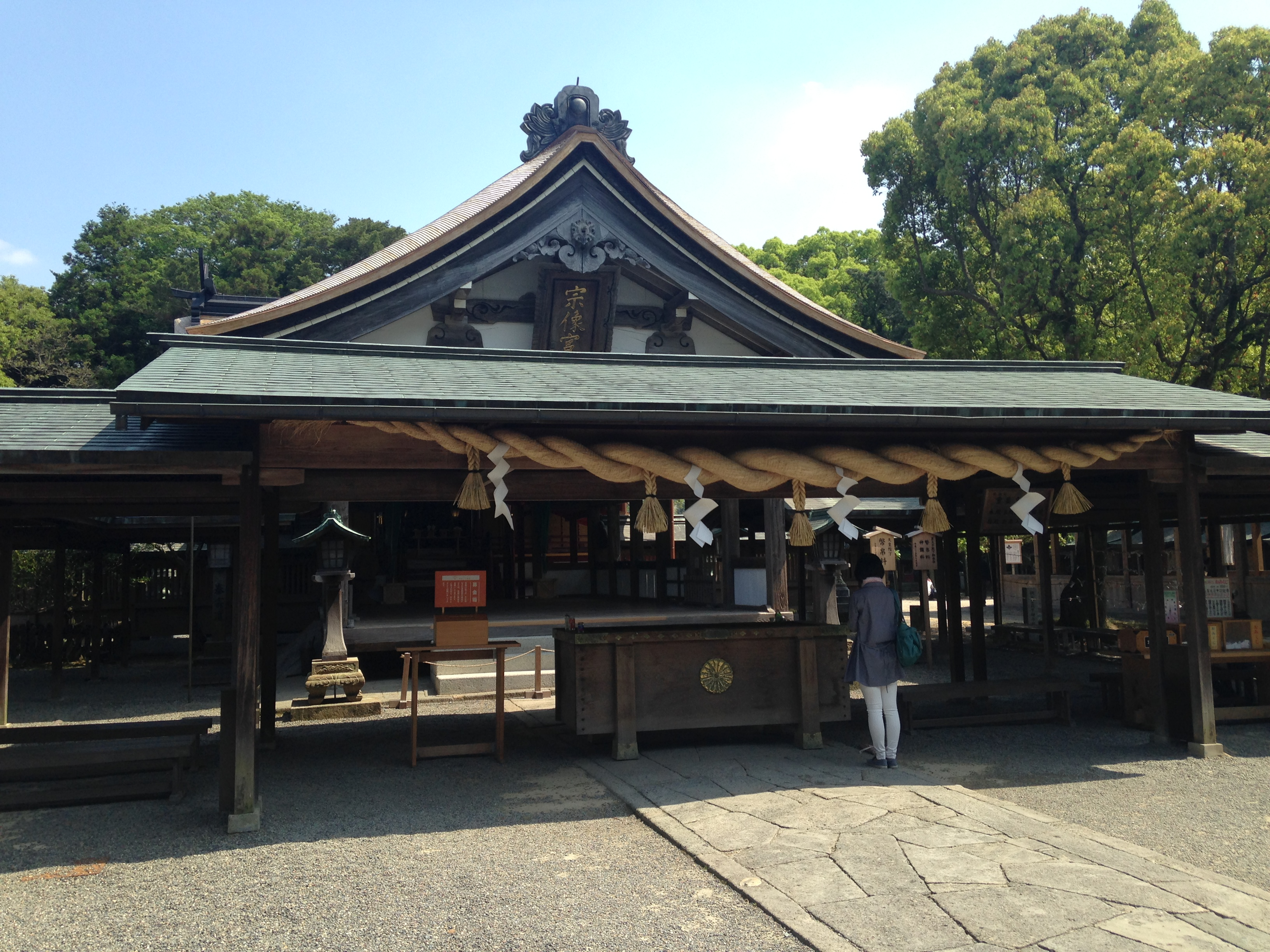
Hetsugu Haiden

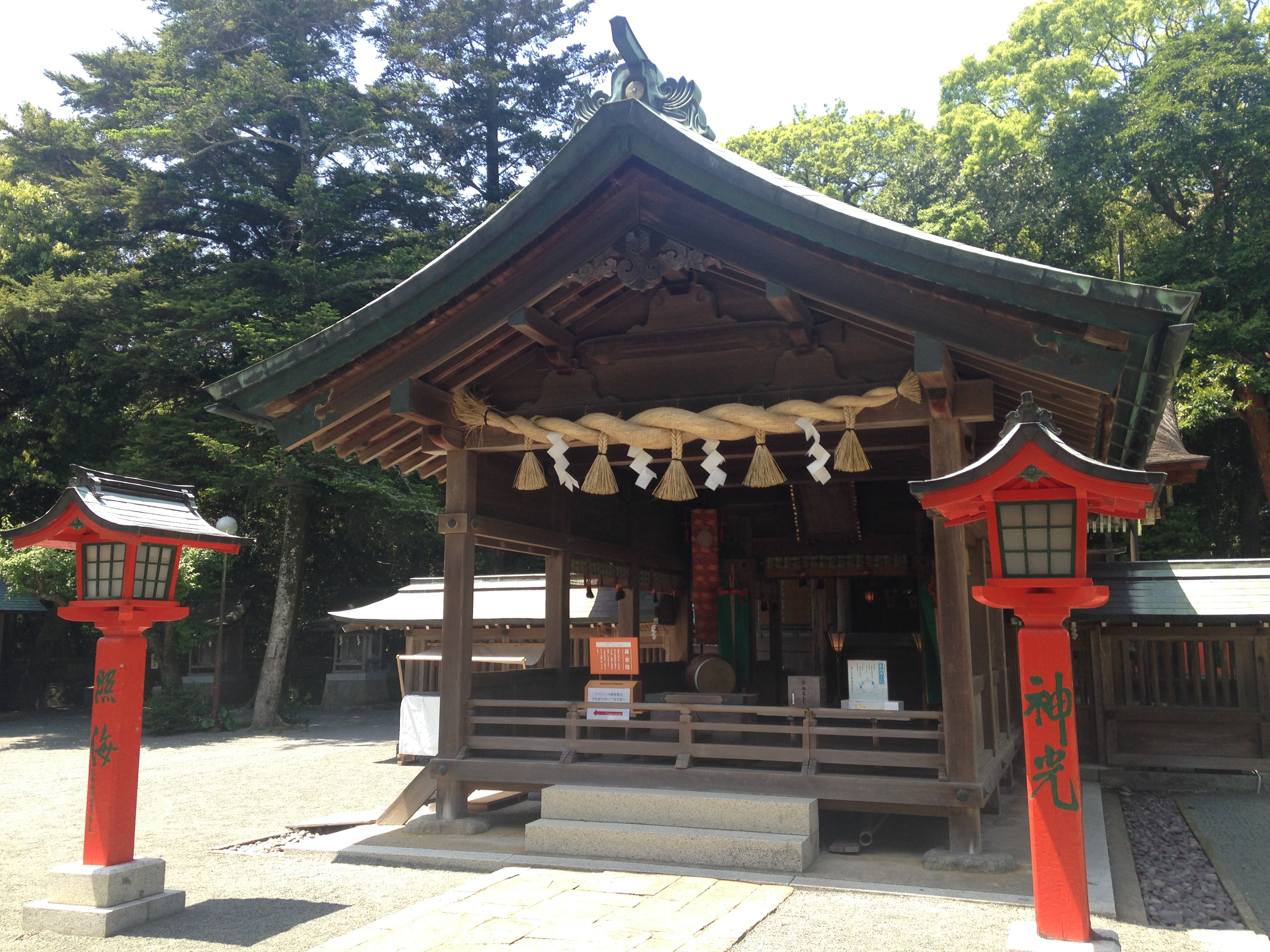
Nakatsugu Haiden

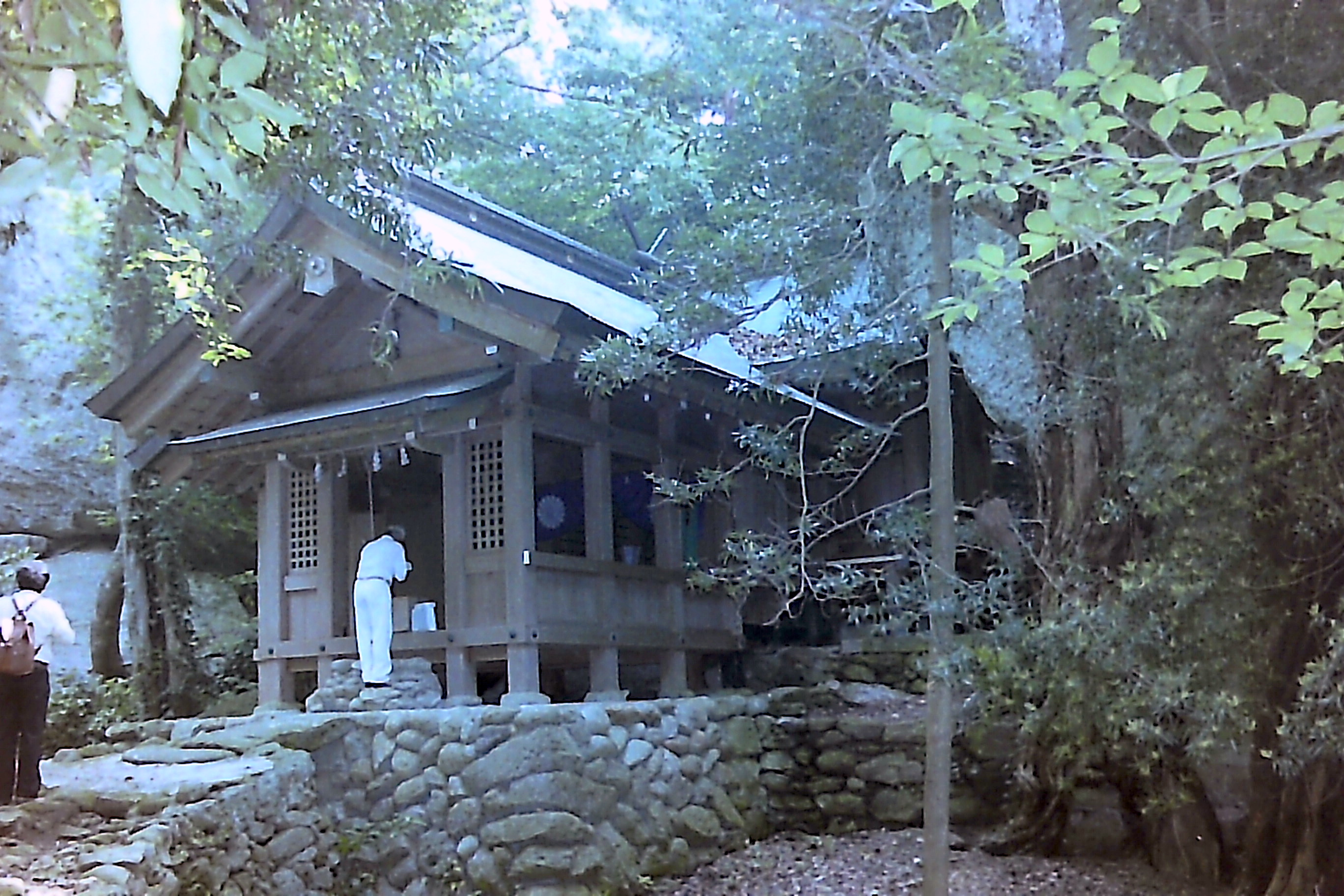
Okitsugu Heiden

== History ==
The three shrines correspond to the three daughters of Susanoo shown on the right

According to legend, the origins of Munakata lie in Japanese mythology. Per the Kojiki and Nihon Shoki, When Amaterasu Omikami and Susanoo no Mikoto made a vow, Amaterasu bit into pieces Susanoo's sword, and the three Munakata goddesses were born from the pieces that blew out. The goddesses, following Amaterasu's divine command, descended to the Tsukushi Munakata Islands in the Genkai Sea to watch over and help the imperial grandson Ninigi no Mikoto, and began to rule this land, which is said to be the origin of Munakata Taisha Shrine. Regarding the sacred objects and shrines of the three Munakata shrines, the Chikuzen Fudoki states, 'When Munakata-no-Okami descended from the heavens to Mount Saimon, he presented the blue jewel-placed in Okutsu Shrine, the eight-foot purple jewel-placed in Nakatsu Shrine, and the Yatagara-no-kagami-in Henotsu Shrine. Per these accounts,Empress Jingu prayed here for the safety of her voyage during her conquest of the Three Kingdoms of Korea, and this miraculous power led to the custom of sending offering messengers to Munakata on various occasions. The Yamato court held the shrine in high esteem, and whenever the capital was relocated in ancient times, a branch shrine was enshrined in the Kashikodokoro (a sacred place) within the palace. This anecdote also provides insight into how the shrine came to be worshipped as the guardian deity of safe navigation.

When the Ritsuryo system was established, the entire Munakata district was granted as a sacred territory, and the local powerful Munakata clan served the shrine as priest and also oversaw the secular administration of the district. According to a stone monument recording the history of the Munakata clan, two generations of Munakata clan leaders married the daughters of Chinese merchants. Furthermore, Munakata Tokuyoshi married his daughter, Amago no Musume, into the harem of Emperor Tenmu. Their first son, Prince Takaichi, born in 654, assisted his father in the Jinshin War and achieved great success, later becoming Grand Minister of State. Prince Nagaya was Takaichi's son and also the ancestor of the Takashina clan. From the Kamakura period onwards, the Munakata clan, transformed into samurai and grew into powerful local lords. However, during the Sengoku period, they were mobilized in wars between neighboring daimyō such as the Ōuchi, Ōtomo, and Shōni clans, and Munakata Taisha became the target of military attacks, frequently suffering from arson and destruction, and the Munakata clan itself declined. However, each time, the shrine was rebuilt thanks to the support of the Imperial Court and samurai. The current Hetsumiya Honden, with its beautiful large thatched roof, was rebuilt in 1578 by Grand Priest Munakata Ujisada, while the Hetsumiya Heiden was rebuilt in 1590 by Kobayakawa Takakage, lord of Chikuzen Province. Both the Honden and Heiden of Hetsumiya are designated as Important Cultural Properties of Japan. The rituals previously performed by the Munakata clan were later passed on to the Kusakari clan (Kusakari Shigetsugu). During the Edo period, there are numerous accounts of the construction and repair of shrine buildings and donations of land by the Kuroda clan, daimyō of Fukuoka Domain. Subsequently, during the anti-Buddhist movement from the end of the Edo period to the Meiji era, Byobuyama Chinkoku-ji, the jingū-ji, was separated from the shrine

In 1871 (Meiji 4), under the Modern system of ranked Shinto Shrines, as "Munakata Jinja" the shrine was ranked as a National shrine, 2nd class. On April 22 of the following year, it was elevated to an Imperial shrine, 2nd class. On July 11, 1901, it was promoted to the highest rank of National shrine, 1st rank (官幣大社, Kanpei Taisha). After World War II, the temple grounds, which had fallen into disrepair, were renovated thanks to a donation from Sazō Idemitsu, businessman and founder of the petroleum company Idemitsu Kosan, who had been born in Akama (Akama district, Munakata City)

== Cultural Properties ==
=== National Treasures ===
- Excavated items from the Okitsumiya ritual site at Munakata Taisha Shrine in Fukuoka Prefecture (福岡県宗像大社沖津宮祭祀遺跡出土品・伝福岡県宗像大社沖津宮祭祀遺跡出土品) Kofun to Heian period; This collection of artifacts was unearthed at over 20 ritual sites on Okinoshima. The artifacts were unearthed during the first three excavations, conducted from 1954 to 1971, spanning the Kofun period through the Heian period (4th to 10th centuries). The artifacts include various bronze mirrors, including those from China and Korea, gilt-bronze (gold-plated copper) horse equipment, Haji ware, sancai pottery, talc products, beads, and swords. Among the artifacts were fragments of glass bowls believed to be from the Sassanid dynasty of Persia. In 1962, the items excavated from the first and second excavations were designated as national treasures, and in 2003, the items excavated from the third excavation were additionally designated. As a collection of approximately 80,000 artifacts, it is the largest collection of national treasures in Japan in terms of quantity.

=== National Important Cultural Properties ===
- Munakata Shrine Hetsugu Haiden (宗像神社辺津宮拝殿) Azuchi-Momoyama period (1590);
- Munakata Shrine Hetsugu Honden (宗像神社辺津宮本殿) Azuchi-Momoyama period (1578);
- Wooden statues of Komainu (木造狛犬一対) Azuchi-Momoyama period;
- Stone statues of Komainu (石造狛犬一対) South Sung Dynasty (1291);
- Kabuto helm (藍韋威肩白胴丸〈兜、壺袖付／〉) Muromachi period;
- Sutra stone (経石（正面阿弥陀如来像・背面阿弥陀経）) Sung Dynasty);
- Munakata Shrine records (宗像神社文書) Heian to Edo Period;
- Complete Sutra of the Master Shikijo (色定法師一筆一切経) Kamakura period;
- Talc Sutra container (滑石製経筒) Heian Period (1154);

=== Fukuoka Prefecture Designated Tangible Cultural Properties ===
- Munakata Shrine Nakatsugu Honden (宗像神社中津宮本殿) Azuchi-Momoyama period (1566);

== See also ==
- Itsukushima Shrine which was dedicated to the same goddesses
- Munakata Saikaku
- List of Shinto shrines
- List of National Treasures of Japan (archaeological materials)
- World Heritage Sites in Japan
- List of Historic Sites of Japan (Fukuoka)
