= Akama Station =

Railway station in Munakata, Fukuoka Prefecture, Japan

JA 14 Akama Station 赤間駅
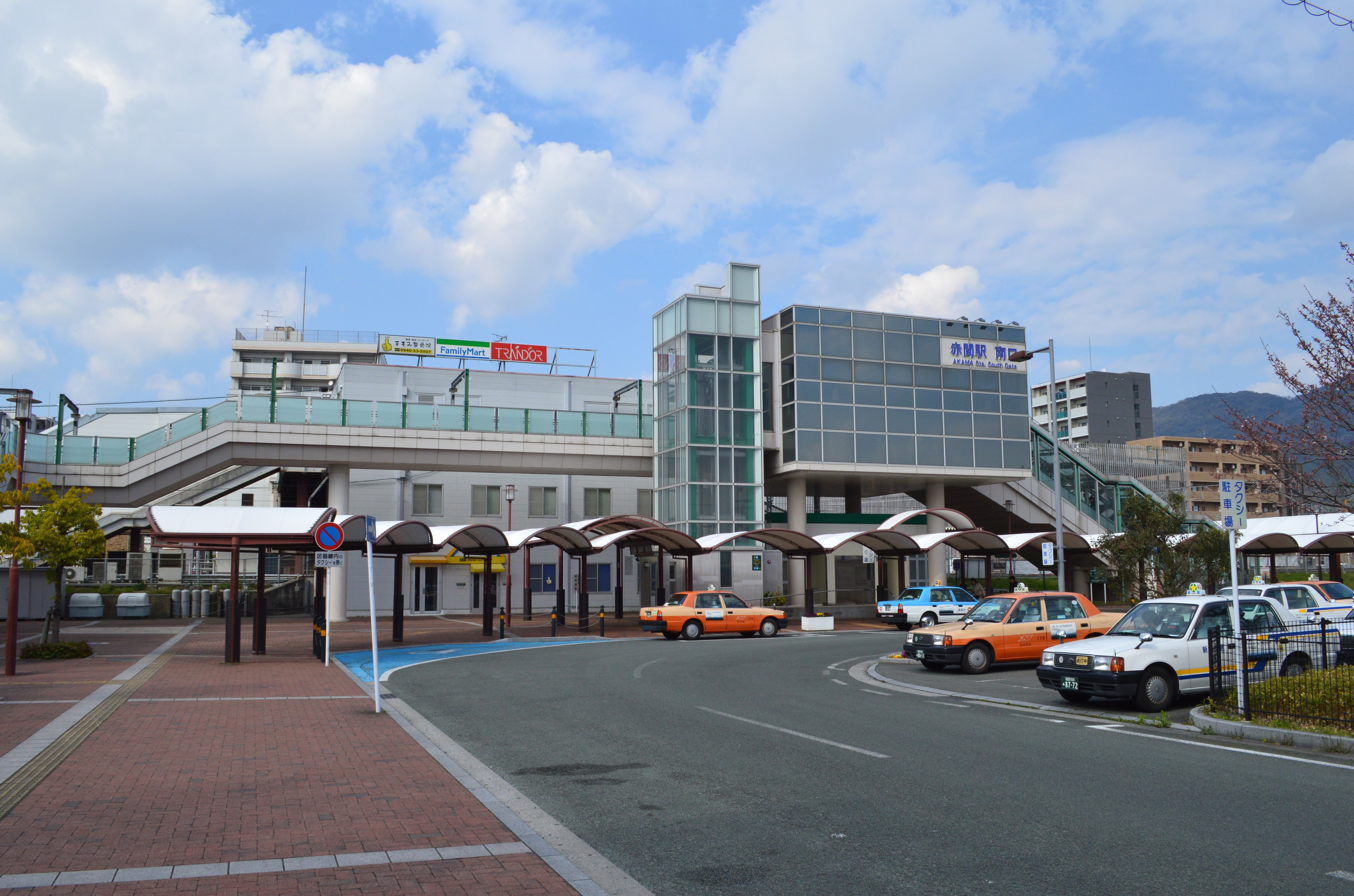
- Akama Station in 2016

General information
- Location: 1-chōme-1 Akama Ekimae, Munakata-shi, Fukuoka-ken 811-4185; Japan
- Coordinates: 33°48′28″N 130°34′09″E
- Operator: JR Kyushu
- Line: JA Kagoshima Main Line
- Distance: 46.5 km from Mojikō
- Platforms: 2 island platforms
- Tracks: 4

Construction
- Structure type: Elevated

Other information
- Status: Staffed (Midori no Madoguchi)
- Website: Official website

History
- Opened: 28 September 1890

Passengers
- FY2020: 6582
- Rank: 17th (among JR Kyushu stations)

Services
Preceding station	JR Kyushu	Following station
Tōgō JA 13 towards Kagoshima	Kagoshima Main Line	Kyōikudaimae JA 15 towards Mojikō
Location
- Location within Fukuoka Prefecture Location within Japan

Akama Station (赤間駅, Akama-eki) is a passenger railway station located in the city of Munakata, Fukuoka Prefecture, Japan. It is operated by JR Kyushu. It is the nearest station to Tokai University Fukuoka Junior College.

== Lines ==
The station is served by the Kagoshima Main Line and is located 46.5 km from the starting point of the line at Mojikō.

== Layout ==
The station consists of two island platforms serving four tracks, connected by an elevated station building. The station has a Midori no Madoguchi staffed ticket office.

=== Platforms ===
1, 2	■ JA Kagoshima Main Line	for Orio, Kokura and Shimonoseki
3, 4	■ JA Kagoshima Main Line	for Fukuma and Hakata

== History ==
The privately run Kyushu Railway had begun laying down its network on Kyushu in 1889 and by 1890 had a stretch of track from Hakata southwards to Kurume. The track was extended northwards from Hakata and on 28 September 1890, Akama was opened as the new northern terminus. On 15 November 1890, Akama became a through station when the track was further extended to Ongagawa. When the Kyushu Railway was nationalized on 1 July 1907, Japanese Government Railways (JGR) took over control of the station. On 12 October 1909, the station became part of the Hitoyoshi Main Line and then on 21 November 1909, part of the Kagoshima Main Line. With the privatization of Japanese National Railways (JNR), the successor of JGR, on 1 April 1987, JR Kyushu took over control of the station.

== Passenger statistics ==
In fiscal 2020, the station was used by an average of 6582 passengers daily (boarding passengers only), and it ranked 17th among the busiest stations of JR Kyushu.

== Surrounding area ==
- Tokai University Fukuoka High School

== See also ==
- List of railway stations in Japan
