= Tokai University Fukuoka Junior College =

Private junior college in Munakata, Fukuoka, Japan

Coordinates: 33°48′12″N 130°33′57″E

- 東海大学福岡短期大学
- Type: Private
- Established: 1990
- Location: Munakata, Fukuoka, Japan
- Website: www.ftokai-u.ac.jp

Tokai University Fukuoka Junior College (東海大学福岡短期大学, Tōkai Daigaku Fukuoka Tanki Daigaku) is a private junior college in Munakata, Fukuoka, Japan. The college opened in 1990, and is affiliated with Tokai University.
