= Munakata, Fukuoka =

Munakata 宗像市
- City
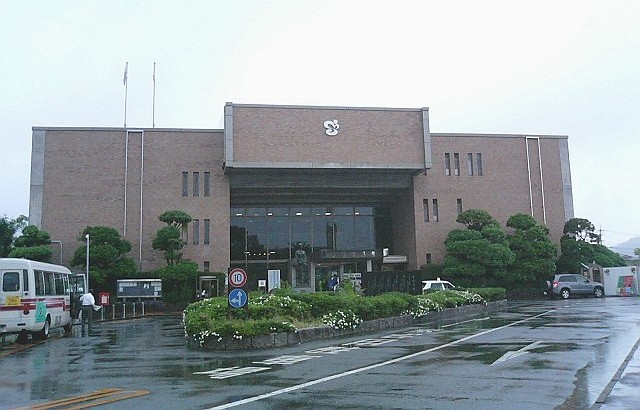
- Munakata City Hall

- Flag Emblem
- Location of Munakata in Fukuoka Prefecture

- Location in Japan
- Coordinates: 33°48′20″N 130°32′27″E
- Country: Japan
- Region: Kyushu Region
- Prefecture: Fukuoka

Government
  - Mayor: Misako Izu (from May 2018)

Area
  - Total: 119.94 km^{2} (46.31 sq mi)

Population (March 31, 2024)
  - Total: 96,786
  - Density: 806.95/km^{2} (2,090.0/sq mi)
- Time zone: UTC+09:00 (JST)
- City hall address: 1-1-1 Tōgō, Munakata-shi, Fukuoka-ken 811-3492
- Climate: Cfa
- Website: Official website
- Symbols
- Flower: Japanese lily
- Tree: Camphor laurel

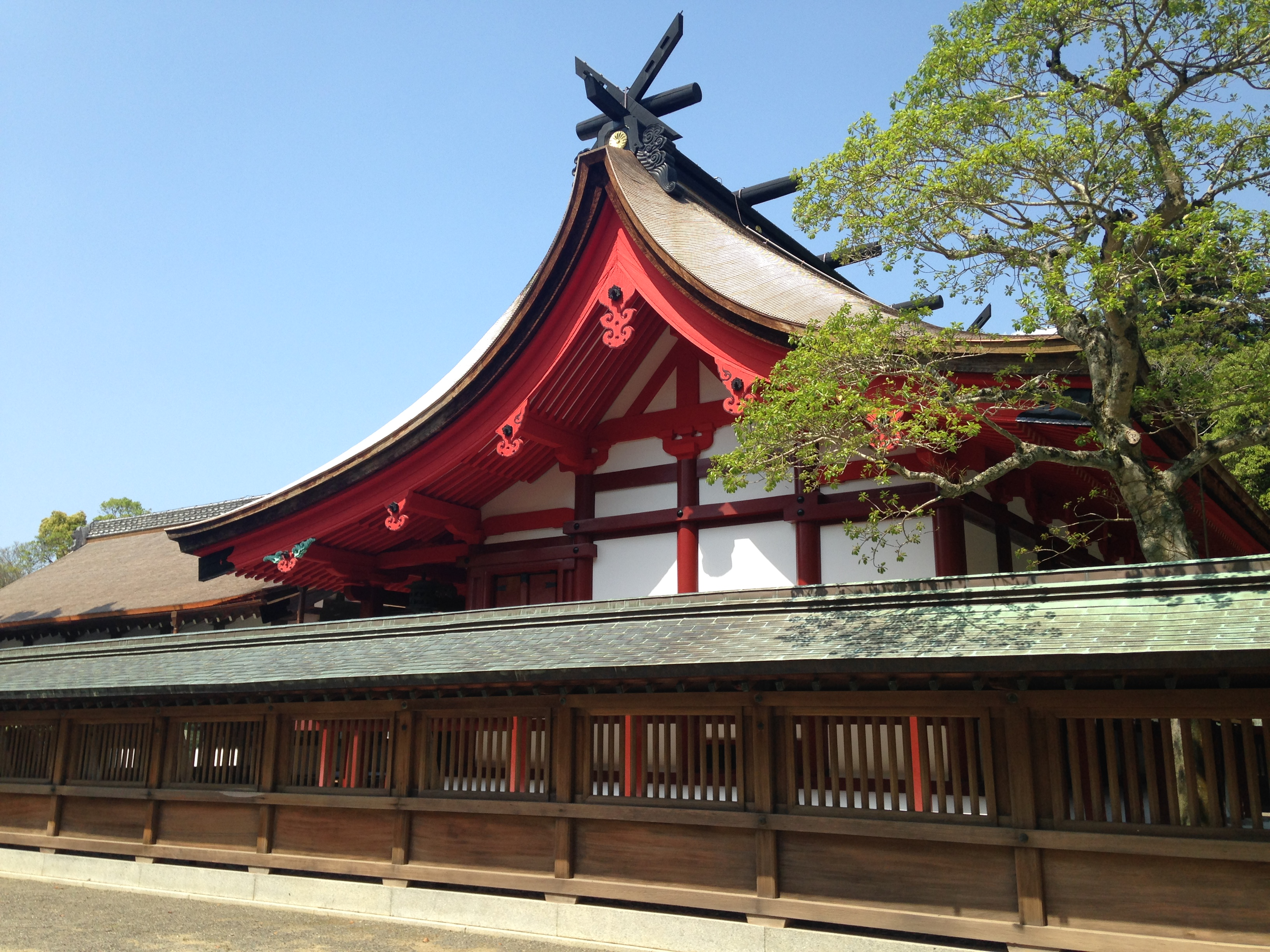
Munakata Taisha

Munakata (宗像市, Munakata-shi) is a city in Japan, located in Fukuoka Prefecture. As of 31 March 2024, the city had an estimated population of 96,786 in 44884 households, and a population density of 810 persons per km². The total area of the city is 119.94 km^{2} (46.31 sq mi).

== History ==
The origin of the name Munakata is said to be from "Minokatachi" or "Minokata" from the enshrinement of three Munakata goddesses, descended from sword of Susanoo-no-Mikoto and mentioned in the Kojiki. It is believed to have been the site of the kingdom of Matsurokoku, one of the countries described in Wajinden, Liangshu and History of the Northern Dynasties, and is the first place where emissaries from China landed on the mainland of Wa. The area was part of ancient Chikugo Province, and prospered from trade with China and Korea from ancient times. From the Asuka period through the Sengoku period, Munakata Taisha controlled most of northern Kyūshū, with the Munakata clan ruling as temporal daimyō over what is now Onga in the east, south to Wakamiya and Miyata, and Shingū in the west. Munakata Ujisada of Munakata Shrine established Tsutagadake castle (Mount Jo) as a defense from invasion by other warlords such as Tachibana Dōsetsu and the Ōtomo clan. There are also ghost stories connected with the area since the Yamada incident arose. During the Edo Period much of the area was under the control of Fukuoka Domain.

After the Meiji restoration, the villages of Akama and Tōgō were established on May 1, 1889 with the creation of the modern municipalities system. Akama was raised to town status on June 25, 1898 and Tōgō on October 1, 1925. Both towns merged with the villages of Yoshitake, Nango, and Kawato in Munakata District to form the town of Munakata on April 1, 1954. Munakata was raised to city status on April 1, 1981. On April 1, 2003, Munakata annexed the town of Gekai, followed by the village of Ōshima on March 28, 2005.

In the earthquake on March 20, 2005, damage was done in various parts of the city. The quake registered just under five on the Japan Meteorological Agency seismic intensity scale.

== Geography ==
Munakata is located in northern Fukuoka Prefecture, approximately halfway between Fukuoka City and Kitakyushu City. It faces the Gulf of Hibiki and the Genkai Sea, and also includes inhabited islands of Oshima and Jijima, and the UNESCO World Heritage Site of Okinoshima offshore.

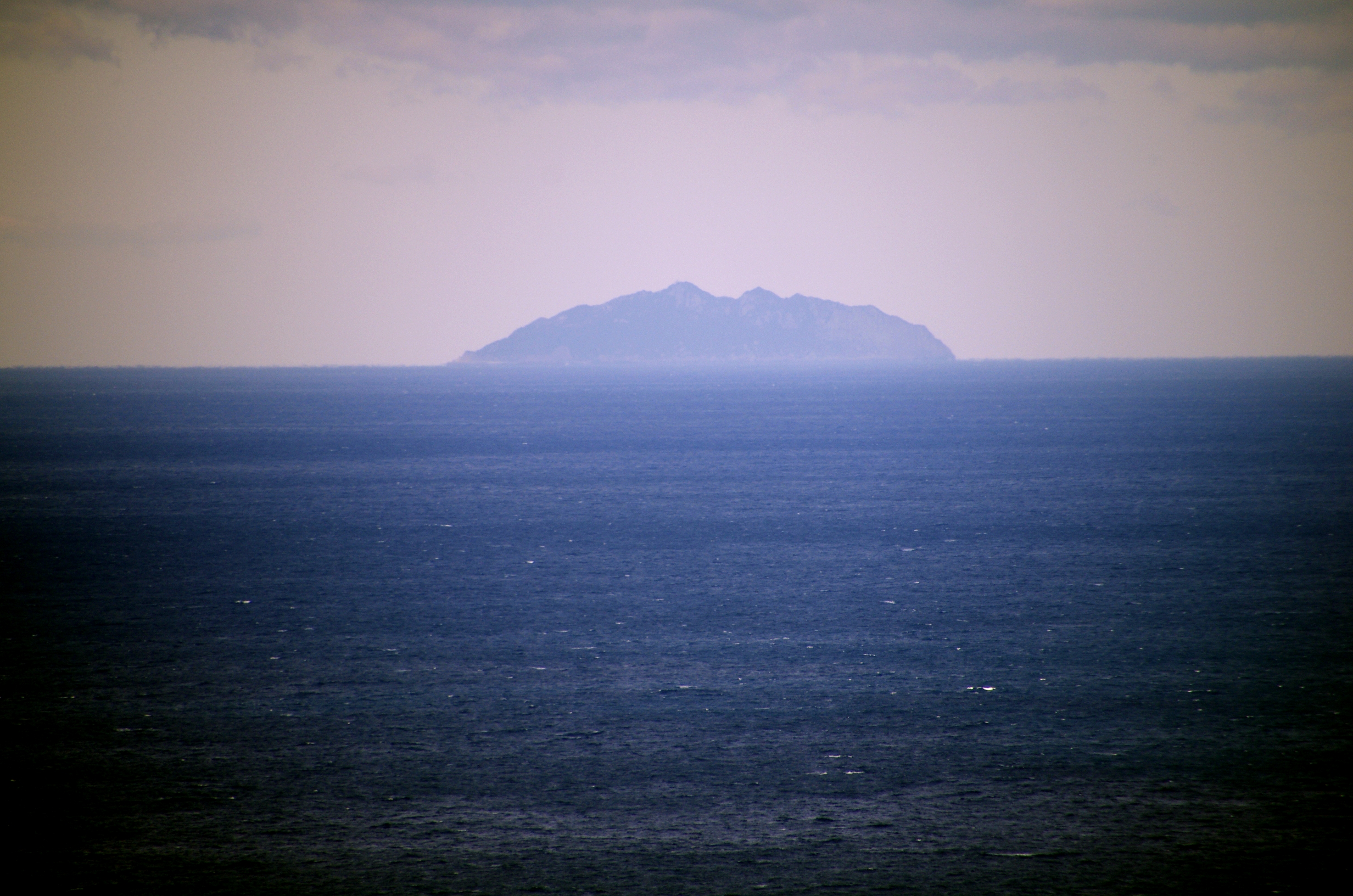
A view of Okinoshima Island, a World Heritage site

=== Mountains ===
- Mount Hakuzan
- Mount Joyama (Mount Tsurugatake)
- Mount Kanayama
- Mount Kodaishiyama
- Mount Konomiyama
- Mount Shintateyama
- Mount Yugawayama

=== Rivers ===
- Tsuri river

=== Neighboring municipalities ===
Fukuoka Prefecture

- Fukutsu
- Koga
- Kurate
- Miyawaka
- Okagaki

=== Climate ===
Munakata has a humid subtropical climate (Köppen: Cfa). The average annual temperature in Munakata is 15.9 °C (60.6 °F). The average annual rainfall is 1,665.2 mm (65.56 in) with July as the wettest month. The temperatures are highest on average in August, at around 27.0 °C (80.6 °F), and lowest in January, at around 5.8 °C (42.4 °F). The highest temperature ever recorded in Munakata was 38.3 °C (100.9 °F) on 26 August 2026; the coldest temperature ever recorded was −9.2 °C (15.4 °F) on 19 February 1977.

Climate data for Munakata (1991−2020 normals, extremes 1977−present)
Month	Jan	Feb	Mar	Apr	May	Jun	Jul	Aug	Sep	Oct	Nov	Dec	Year
Record high °C (°F)	20.4 (68.7)	23.5 (74.3)	25.4 (77.7)	30.4 (86.7)	32.0 (89.6)	34.6 (94.3)	36.6 (97.9)	38.3 (100.9)	36.4 (97.5)	32.4 (90.3)	27.5 (81.5)	24.8 (76.6)	38.3 (100.9)
Mean daily maximum °C (°F)	9.7 (49.5)	10.7 (51.3)	13.9 (57.0)	18.8 (65.8)	23.5 (74.3)	26.4 (79.5)	29.8 (85.6)	31.0 (87.8)	27.4 (81.3)	22.7 (72.9)	17.5 (63.5)	12.1 (53.8)	20.3 (68.5)
Daily mean °C (°F)	5.8 (42.4)	6.5 (43.7)	9.4 (48.9)	13.8 (56.8)	18.4 (65.1)	22.2 (72.0)	26.2 (79.2)	27.0 (80.6)	23.3 (73.9)	18.0 (64.4)	12.7 (54.9)	7.8 (46.0)	15.9 (60.7)
Mean daily minimum °C (°F)	1.7 (35.1)	1.9 (35.4)	4.4 (39.9)	8.6 (47.5)	13.4 (56.1)	18.6 (65.5)	23.1 (73.6)	23.8 (74.8)	19.7 (67.5)	13.4 (56.1)	7.9 (46.2)	3.3 (37.9)	11.7 (53.0)
Record low °C (°F)	−5.7 (21.7)	−9.2 (15.4)	−5.1 (22.8)	−1.9 (28.6)	2.8 (37.0)	5.9 (42.6)	14.4 (57.9)	16.3 (61.3)	6.7 (44.1)	1.1 (34.0)	−1.9 (28.6)	−4.7 (23.5)	−9.2 (15.4)
Average precipitation mm (inches)	85.7 (3.37)	76.3 (3.00)	119.1 (4.69)	134.4 (5.29)	137.0 (5.39)	230.2 (9.06)	302.4 (11.91)	177.1 (6.97)	150.7 (5.93)	84.9 (3.34)	91.2 (3.59)	76.2 (3.00)	1,665.2 (65.56)
Average precipitation days (≥ 1.0 mm)	10.5	9.9	10.9	10.3	8.9	11.9	11.1	9.3	9.9	7.4	8.9	9.2	118.2
Mean monthly sunshine hours	100.1	118.2	159.3	185.4	200.6	139.9	178.8	209.0	164.8	173.1	134.4	106.5	1,870.1
Source: Japan Meteorological Agency

=== Demographics ===
Per Japanese census data, the population of Munakata in 2020 is 97,095 people. Munakata has been conducting censuses since 1950.

Historical population
Year	Pop.	±%
1950	34,217	—
1955	34,942	+2.1%
1960	33,537	−4.0%
1965	34,029	+1.5%
1970	40,309	+18.5%
1975	56,194	+39.4%
1980	66,985	+19.2%
1985	71,389	+6.6%
1990	78,197	+9.5%
1995	86,938	+11.2%
2000	92,056	+5.9%
2005	94,148	+2.3%
2010	95,481	+1.4%
2015	96,516	+1.1%
2020	97,095	+0.6%
Munakata population statistics

== Government ==
Munakata has a mayor-council form of government with a directly elected mayor and a unicameral city council of 20 members. Munakata contributes two members to the Fukuoka Prefectural Assembly. In terms of national politics, the city is part of the Fukuoka 4th district of the lower house of the Diet of Japan.

== Economy ==
Agriculture, commercial fishing and commerce are the mainstays of the local economy. Munakata belongs to both the Fukuoka metropolitan area and the Kitakyushu metropolitan area, and the commuter percentage is within 10% of both metropolitan areas. It continues to develop as a commuter town, and the population is increasing because it is located halfway between the two cities and has good transportation links. The city is rich in tourist resources, and is also home to Munakata Taisha, a UNESCO World Heritage Site that is said to be the guardian deity of maritime and traffic safety.

== Education ==
=== Colleges and universities ===
- The Japanese Red Cross Kyushu International College of Nursing
- Tokai University Fukuoka Junior College
- University of Teacher Education Fukuoka

=== Primary and secondary education ===
Munakata has 14 public elementary schools and six public junior high schools operated by the city government and one public combined middle/high schools operated by the Fukuoka Prefectural Board of Education. There is also one private high school.

== Transportation ==
=== Railways ===
JR Kyushu - Kagoshima Main Line

JA Kyōikudaimae - Akama - Tōgō

=== Highways ===
- Kyushu Expressway
- National Route 3
- National Route 495

== Sister cities ==
- Gimhae, Gyeongsangnam-do, South Korea, sister city since 1992. At the time of conclusion, former Munakata City.
- Seongsan-eup, Seogwipo, Jeju-do, South Korea, friendship and exchange city since 1991. At the time of conclusion, former Genkai Town and former Seongsan-eup, Namjeju County.
- Kazanlak, Stara Zagora Province, Bulgaria, friendship and exchange city since 2010

== Local attractions ==
- Akama, historical district and city center of Munakata. It contains rows of old houses belonging, along two now-ruined castles: Hakusan Castle and Tsutagadake Castle.
- Munakata Taisha
- Sakurakyō Kofun, National Historic Site
- Taguma Ishihatake Site, National Historic Site

== Sports facilities ==
- Genkai Ground, which hosts the Munakata Sanix Blues rugby team
- Global Arena, which has hosted the Sanix World Rugby Youth Invitational Tournament since 2000

== Notable people from Munakata ==
- Toru Abe, actor
- Sazō Idemitsu, entrepreneur
- Takuji Nakamura, painter
- Eri Nobuchika, singer-songwriter
