= Tōgō Station =

Railway station in Munakata, Fukuoka Prefecture, Japan

JA 13 Tōgō Station 東郷駅
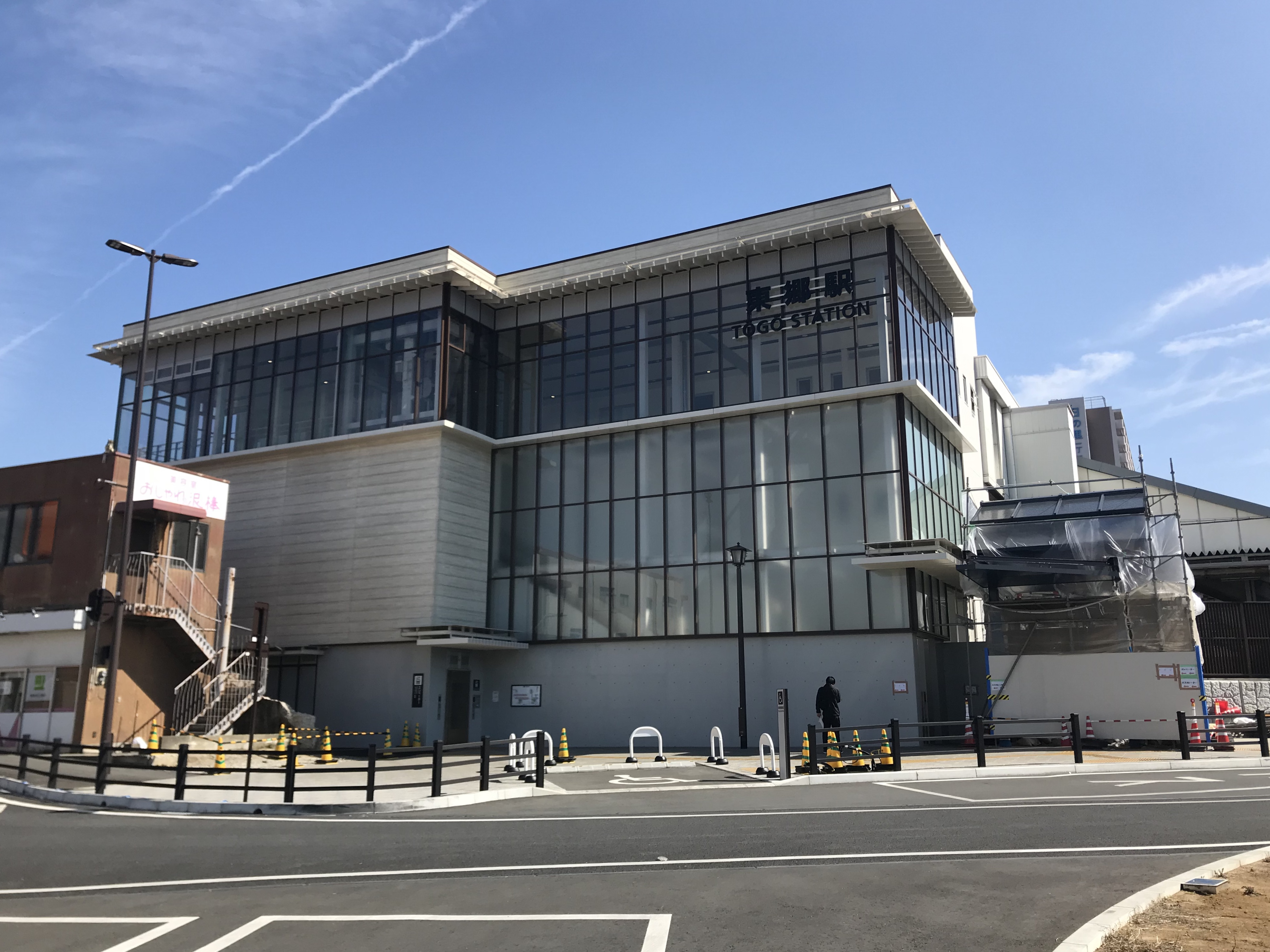
- The north entrance of Tōgō Station in 2018

General information
- Location: 4-chōme-9 Taguma, Munakata-shi, Fukuoka-ken 811-3431; Japan
- Coordinates: 33°47′40″N 130°31′41″E
- Operator: JR Kyushu
- Line: JA Kagoshima Main Line
- Distance: 50.7 km from Mojikō
- Platforms: 2 side platforms
- Tracks: 2 + 2 sidings

Construction
- Structure type: Elevated

Other information
- Status: Staffed (Midori no Madoguchi)
- Website: Official website

History
- Opened: 1 April 1913

Passengers
- FY2020: 4144
- Rank: 38th (among JR Kyushu stations)

Services
Preceding station	JR Kyushu	Following station
Higashi-Fukuma towards Kagoshima	Kagoshima Main Line	Akama towards Mojikō
Location
- Location within Fukuoka Prefecture Location within Japan

Tōgō Station (東郷駅, Tōgō-eki) is a passenger railway station located in the city of Munakata, Fukuoka Prefecture, Japan. It is operated by JR Kyushu.

== Lines ==
The station is served by the Kagoshima Main Line and is located 50.7 km from the starting point of the line at Mojikō.

== Layout ==
The station consists of two side platforms serving two tracks, connected by an elevated station building. The station has a Midori no Madoguchi staffed ticket office. Two sidings branch off the main tracks.

=== Platforms ===
1	■ JA Kagoshima Main Line	for Kokura and Shimonoseki
2	■ JA Kagoshima Main Line	for Hakata and Kurume

== History ==
The station was opened by Japanese Government Railways (JGR) on 1 April 1913 as an added station on the existing Kagoshima Main Line track. With the privatization of Japanese National Railways (JNR), the successor of JGR, on 1 April 1987, JR Kyushu took over control of the station.

== Passenger statistics ==
In fiscal 2020, the station was used by an average of 4144 passengers daily (boarding passengers only), and it ranked 38th among the busiest stations of JR Kyushu.

== Surrounding area ==
The station is located on the west side of Munakata City. This station is the closest station to Munakata City Hall, but it is approximately 1.5 kilometers away from the station.

- Munakata City Hall
- Fukuoka Prefectural Munakata Junior and Senior High School
- Munakata City Chuo Junior High School

== See also ==
- List of railway stations in Japan
