= Nii Ōshima =

Island in Ehime, Japan

Native name: 新居大島
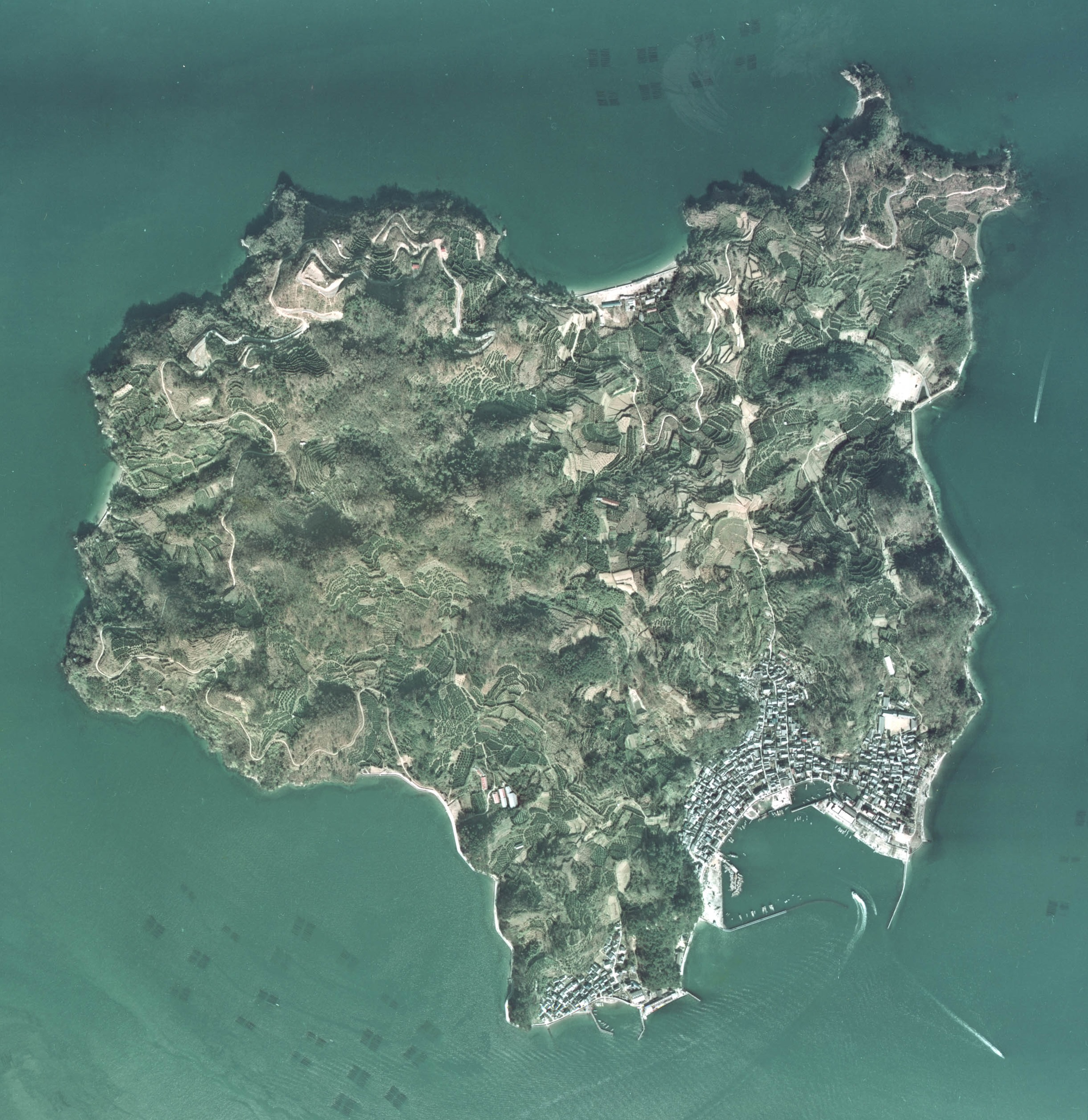

- Location within Ehime Prefecture Location within Japan

Geography
- Location: Geiyo Islands (Seto Inland Sea)
- Coordinates: 33°59′51″N 133°21′45″E
- Total islands: 1
- Area: 2.13 km^{2} (0.82 sq mi)
- Coastline: 9.1 km (5.65 mi)

Administration
- Japan

Demographics
- Population: 280 (2013)
- Ethnic groups: Japanese

Nii Ōshima (新居大島), or sometimes just Ōshima (大島), is an inhabited island located roughly 1.5 kilometers northeast of the city of Niihama (which it is officially a part of) in Ehime Prefecture, Japan.

== Geography ==
Nii Ōshima is located in the Seto Inland Sea. It has a circumference of approximately 8 kilometers and a total area of 2.13 square kilometres (0.82 sq mi). The island is mostly hilly, with its highest point at 146.48 meters above sea level. The northern part of the island is covered with dense forests, has many cliffs. The main settlement is in the southern part of the island. There is a ferry that runs between Nii Ōshima and Niihama approximately once every hour, taking fifteen minutes to complete a one-way journey. At one point, there was the possibility that a bridge might be built to connect Ōshima and Shikoku, but these plans are now considered unlikely. There is no public transportation on the island, but there is a road that circles the island.

== History ==
Nii Ōshima was the birthplace of Murakami Yoshihiro (d.1374), founder of the "Murakami Navy", who ruled the Seto Inland Sea in the Muromachi and Sengoku period. On the southern side of the island sit the remains of Ōshima Castle, which was one of the Murakami strongholds. The island became Ōshima Village in Ehime Prefecture, with the establishment of the modern municipalities system on December 15, 1889. The village was absorbed by Niihama City on May 3, 1953. Due to its rapidly aging population and its geographic isolation from Niihama and the main island of Shikoku, Nii Ōshima faces serious problems of rural depopulation. At the time of 1950 census, the population of the island was 1838 people. However, per Niihama City residency records, the population as of March 31, 2013, was only 280, with half the population over the age of 70. The primary occupations on the island include shrimp farming and agriculture, particularly mikan and a distinctive type of white potato.
