= Genkai Sea =

Body of water in the Sea of Japan

Coordinates: 33°40′N 130°00′E

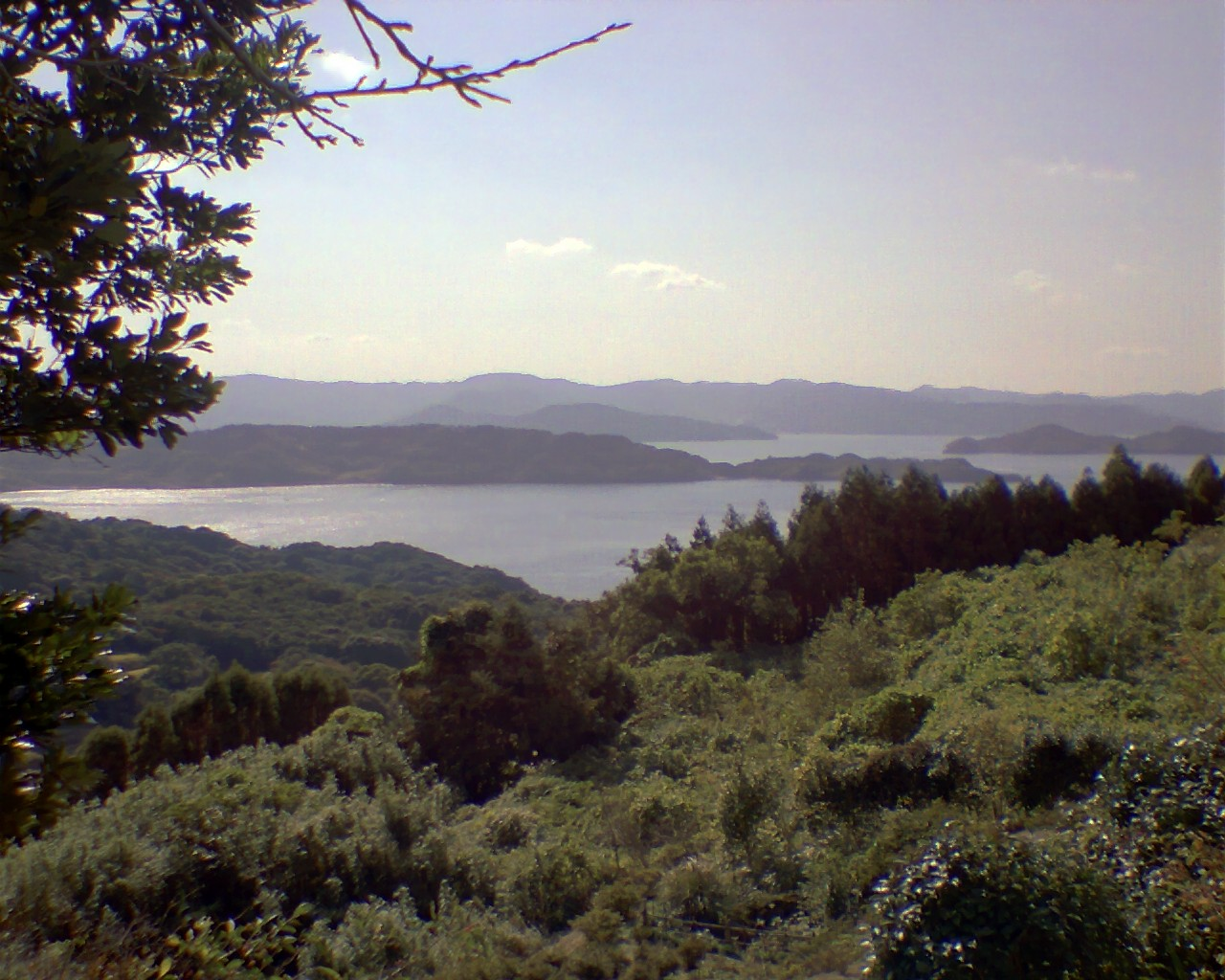
Genkai Sea in 2005

The Genkai Sea (玄界灘, Genkai-nada) is a body of water that comprises the southwestern tip of the Sea of Japan and borders the northern coasts of Fukuoka and Saga prefectures. It is the part of Korea Strait that lies between Kyushu and Iki Island.
