= Asahi Station =

Asahi Station is the name of four train stations in Japan:

- Asahi Station (Chiba) (旭駅)
- Asahi Station (Kōchi) (旭駅)
- Asahi Station (Mie) (朝日駅)
- Ise-Asahi Station (伊勢朝日駅)
- Asahi Station (Nagano) (朝陽駅)

== See also ==
- Hizen-Asahi Station, on the Kagoshima Main Line in Tosu, Saga
