= Kasuga Station =

Kasuga Station is the name of two train stations in Japan:

- Kasuga Station (Fukuoka)
- Kasuga Station (Tokyo)
