= Ōnojō Station =

Railway station in Ōnojō, Fukuoka Prefecture, Japan

JB 05 Ōnojō Station 大野城駅
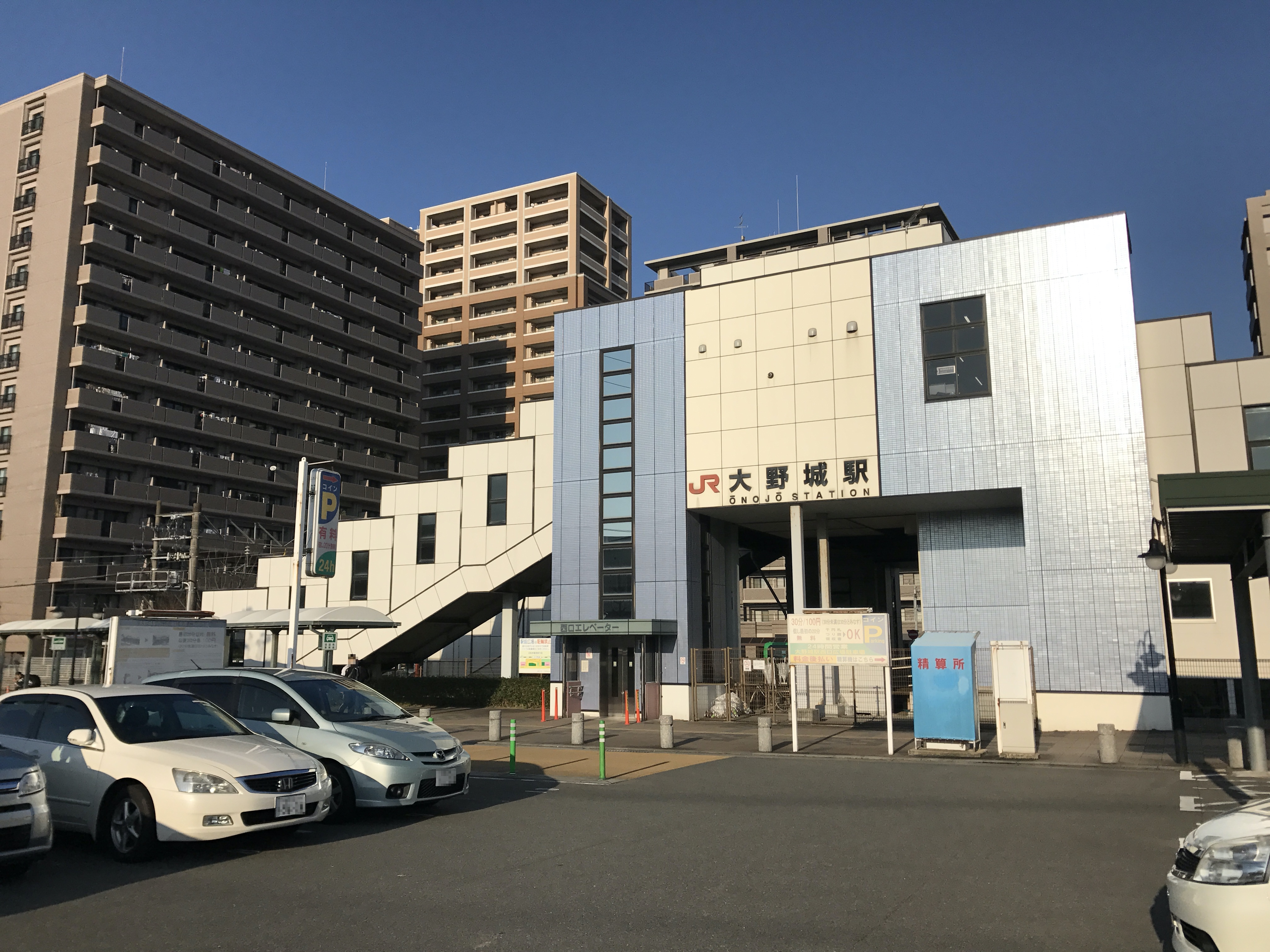
- Ōnojō Station in 2017

General information
- Location: 1-17-12 Shirakihara, Ōnojō-shi, Fukuoka-ken 816-0943; Japan
- Coordinates: 33°31′29″N 130°28′48″E
- Operator: JR Kyushu
- Line: JB Kagoshima Main Line
- Distance: 87.4 km from Mojikō
- Platforms: 2 side platforms
- Tracks: 2

Construction
- Structure type: At grade

Other information
- Status: Staffed ticket window (Midori no Madoguchi)
- Website: Official website

History
- Opened: 10 June 1946
- Former names: Shirakibaru (until 1989)

Passengers
- FY2020: 6554 daily
- Rank: 18th (among JR Kyushu stations)

Services
Preceding station	JR Kyushu	Following station
Mizuki towards Kagoshima	Kagoshima Main Line	Kasuga towards Mojikō
Location
- Location within Fukuoka Prefecture Location within Japan

Ōnojō Station (大野城駅, Ōnojō-eki) is a passenger railway station located in the city of Ōnojō, Fukuoka Prefecture, Japan. It is operated by JR Kyushu.

== Lines ==
The station is served by the Kagoshima Main Line and is located 87.4 km from the starting point of the line at Mojiko.

== Layout ==
The station consists of two opposed side platforms serving two tracks at grade. The platforms are connected by an elevated station building, which has a Midori no Madoguchi staffed ticket office.

=== Platforms ===
1	■ JB Kagoshima Main Line	for Futsukaichi and Tosu
2	■ JB Kagoshima Main Line	for Hakata and Kokura

== History ==
On 10 June 1946, Japanese Government Railways (JGR) opened the Kasuga Signal Box at the present location of the station. On 1 October 1961, Japanese National Railways (JNR), the successor of JGR, upgraded the facility to a full station and renamed it Shirakibaru Station (白木原駅, Shirakibaru-eki). With the privatization of JNR on 1 April 1987, JR Kyushu took over control of the station. On 11 March 1989, the station was renamed Ōnojō.

== Passenger statistics ==
In fiscal 2020, the station was used by an average of 6554 passengers daily (boarding passengers only), and it ranked 18th among the busiest stations of JR Kyushu.

== Surrounding area ==
- Kyushu University Chikushi Campus
- Shirakibaru Station (Nishitetsu Tenjin Ōmuta Line)
- Dazaifu Mizuki-ato
- Kasuga Park

== See also ==
- List of railway stations in Japan
