= Chihaya Yard =

Railway yard in Higashi-ku, Fukuoka, Japan

Coordinates: 33°38′44″N 130°26′14″E

Chihaya Yard (千早操車場, Chihaya sōshajō) is a classification yard on the Kagoshima Main Line operated by Japan Freight Railway Company in Higashi-ku, Fukuoka, Japan. It is located between Chihaya Station and Hakozaki Station.
