= Higashi-Kokura Freight Terminal =

Freight terminal in Kitakyushu, Japan

Coordinates: 33°53′16″N 130°53′58″E

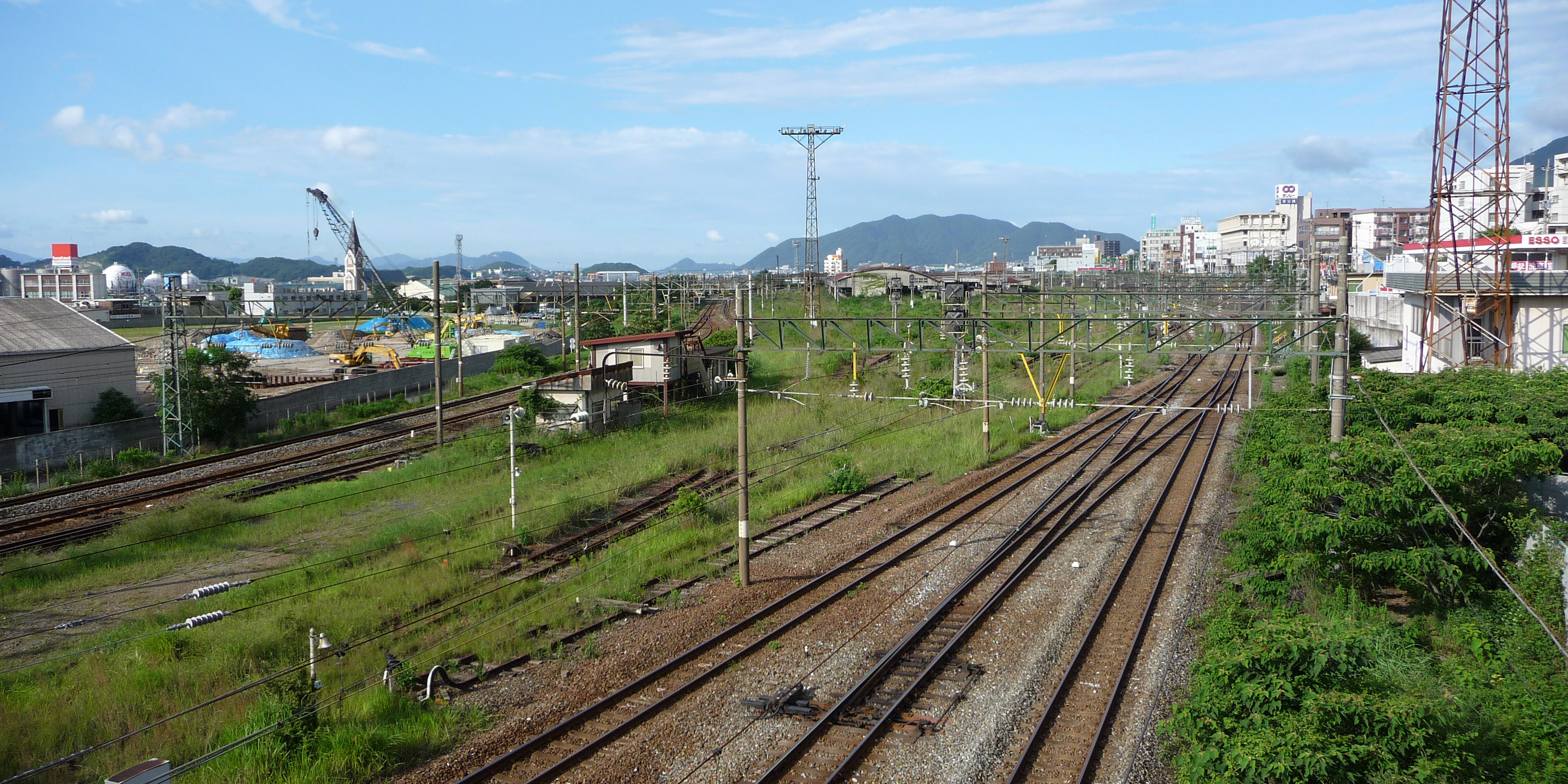
Higashi-Kokura railway

Higashi-Kokura Freight Terminal (東小倉駅, Higashi-Kokura-eki) is a freight terminal on the Kagoshima Main Line in Kokurakita-ku, Kitakyūshū, Japan, operated by Japan Freight Railway Company (JR Freight). Presently it handles no trains.

== History ==
The terminal was originally a station serving both passenger and freight trains. It opened on April 1, 1915, as the terminal of the Kokura Railway, the predecessor of the Hitahikosan Line. When the Japanese Government Railways purchased the Kokura Railway on May 1, 1943, the station was reestablished on the Kagoshima Main Line as a junction of the two lines, but the station served no passenger trains on the Kagoshima Main Line. The passenger service at the station was ceased on November 19, 1956, as the section between Higashi-Kokura and Ishida on the Hitahikosan Line ceased to operate passenger trains.

Although the freight-only section of the Hitahikosan Line was closed on October 1, 1962, the terminal continued the freight operation on the Kagoshima Main Line until March 23, 2002 when the new Kitakyūshū Freight Terminal opened. The station has not been officially closed.
