= Mizuki Station =

Railway station in Ōnojō, Fukuoka Prefecture, Japan

JB 06 Mizuki Station 水城駅
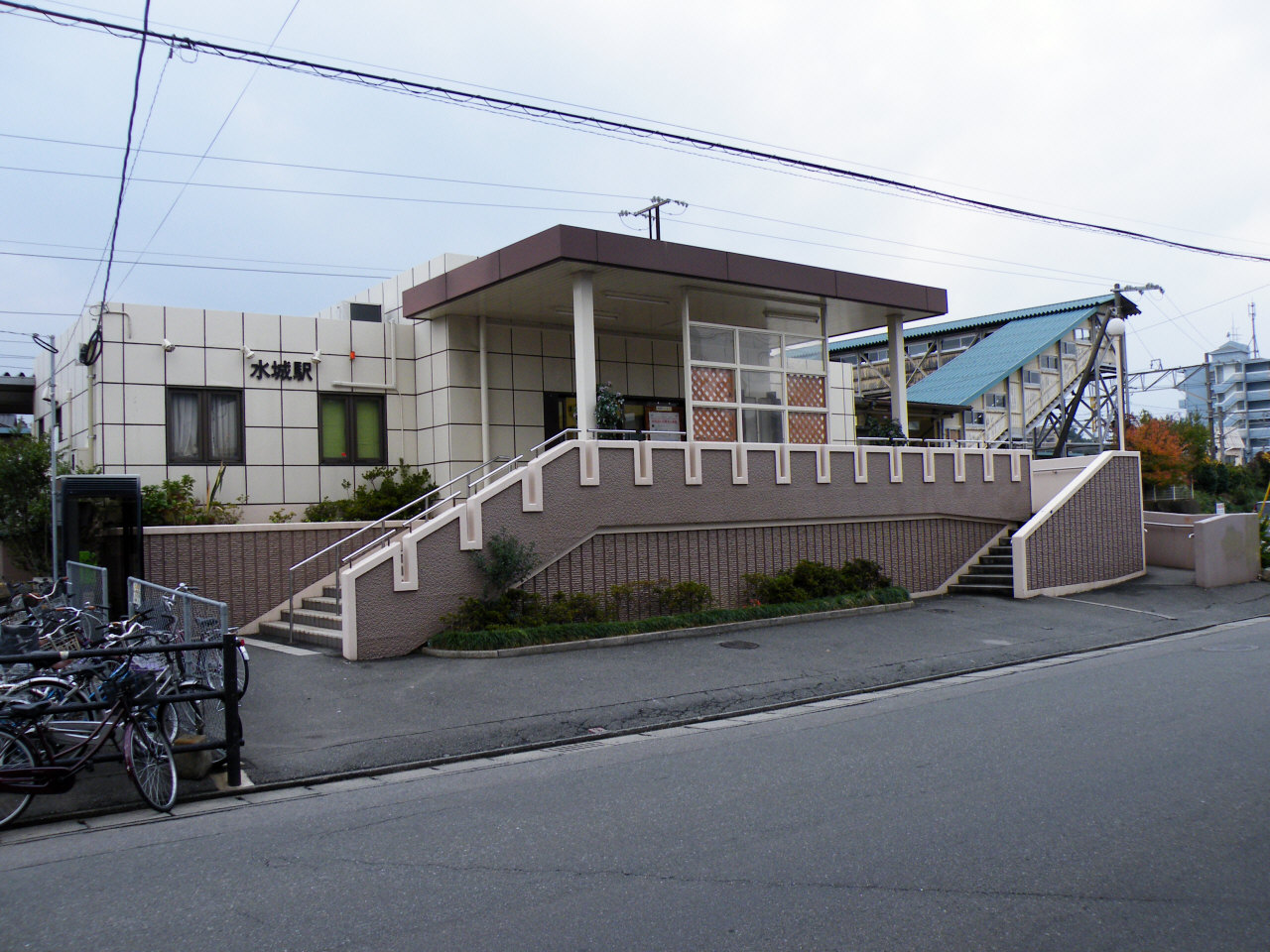
- Mizuki Station

General information
- Location: 3-chōme-1 Shimoōri, Ōnojō-shi, Fukuoka-ken 816-0952; Japan
- Coordinates: 33°31′04″N 130°29′25″E
- Operator: JR Kyushu
- Line: JB Kagoshima Main Line
- Distance: 88.8 km from Mojikō
- Platforms: 2 side platforms
- Tracks: 2

Construction
- Structure type: At grade

Other information
- Status: Staffed (Ask me anything! "Do~zo"(なんでも私に聞いてください！「ど～ぞ」))
- Website: Official website

History
- Opened: 21 September 1913

Passengers
- FY2020: 1661 daily
- Rank: 86th (among JR Kyushu stations)

Services
Preceding station	JR Kyushu	Following station
Tofurōminami towards Kagoshima	Kagoshima Main Line	Ōnojō towards Mojikō
Location
- Location within Fukuoka Prefecture Location within Japan

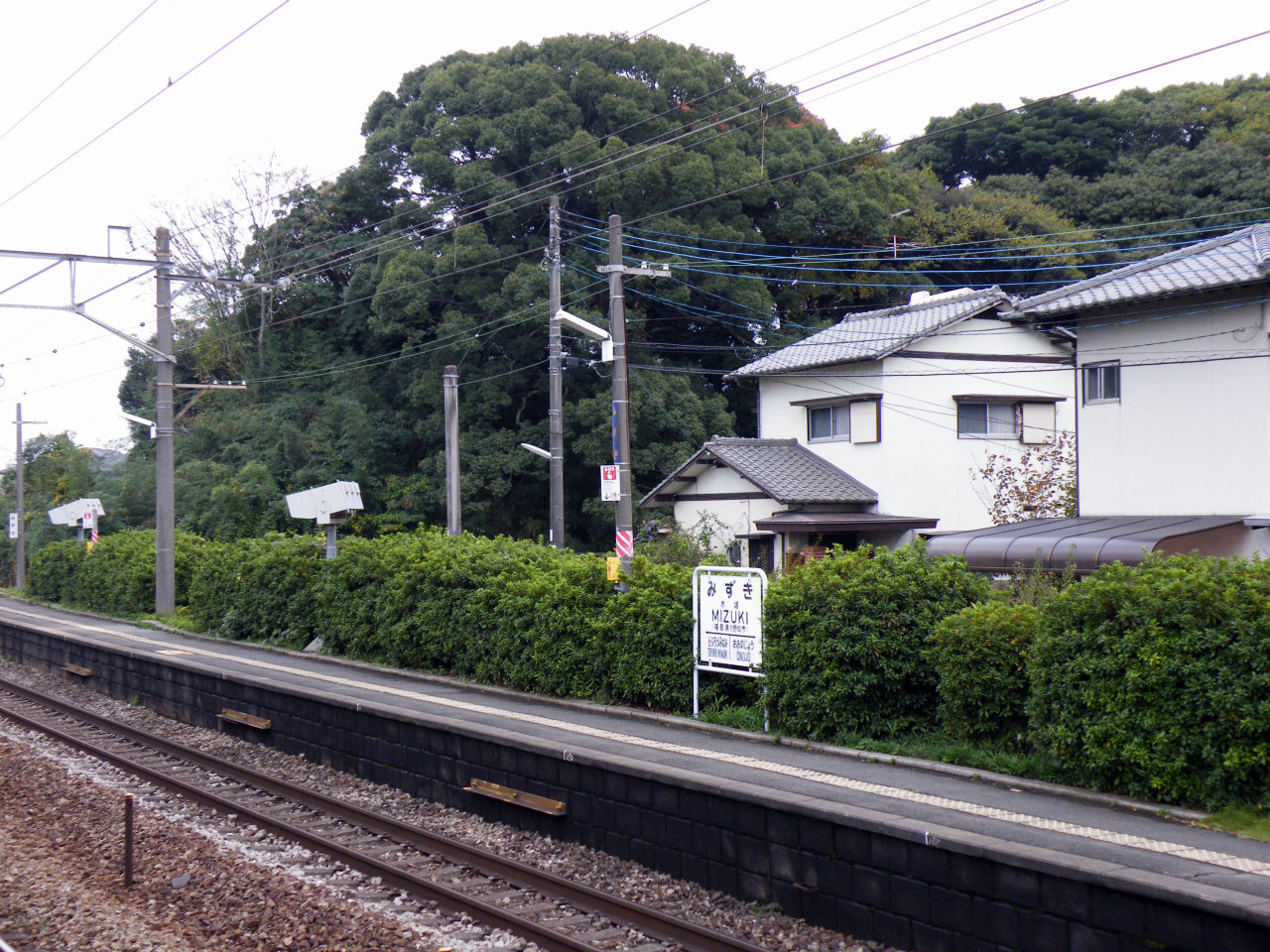
Platform for Mojikō and "Mizuki".

Mizuki Station (水城駅, Mizuki-eki) is a passenger railway station located in the city of Ōnojō, Fukuoka Prefecture, Japan. It is operated by JR Kyushu.

== Lines ==
The station is served by the Kagoshima Main Line and is located 88.8 km from the starting point of the line at Mojiko.

== Layout ==
The station consists of two opposed side platforms serving two tracks at grade, which are connected to the station building by a footbridge. The station is staffed.

=== Platforms ===
1	■ JB Kagoshima Main Line	for Futsukaichi and Tosu
2	■ JB Kagoshima Main Line	for Hakata and Kokura

== History ==
The station was opened by Japanese Government Railways (JGR) on 21 September 1913 as an additional station on the existing Kagoshima Main Line track. With the privatization of Japanese National Railways (JNR), the successor of JGR, on 1 April 1987, JR Kyushu took over control of the station.

== Passenger statistics ==
In fiscal 2020, the station was used by an average of 1661 passengers daily (boarding passengers only), and it ranked 86th among the busiest stations of JR Kyushu.

== Surrounding area ==
- Mizuki Castle, a very early Japanese castle dating from 664 AD.
- Minami-Fukuoka Driving School
- Shimoōri Station (Nishitetsu Tenjin Ōmuta Line)

== See also ==
- List of railway stations in Japan
