= Tofurōminami Station =

Railway station in Dazaifu, Fukuoka Prefecture, Japan

JB 07 Tofurōminami Station 都府楼南駅
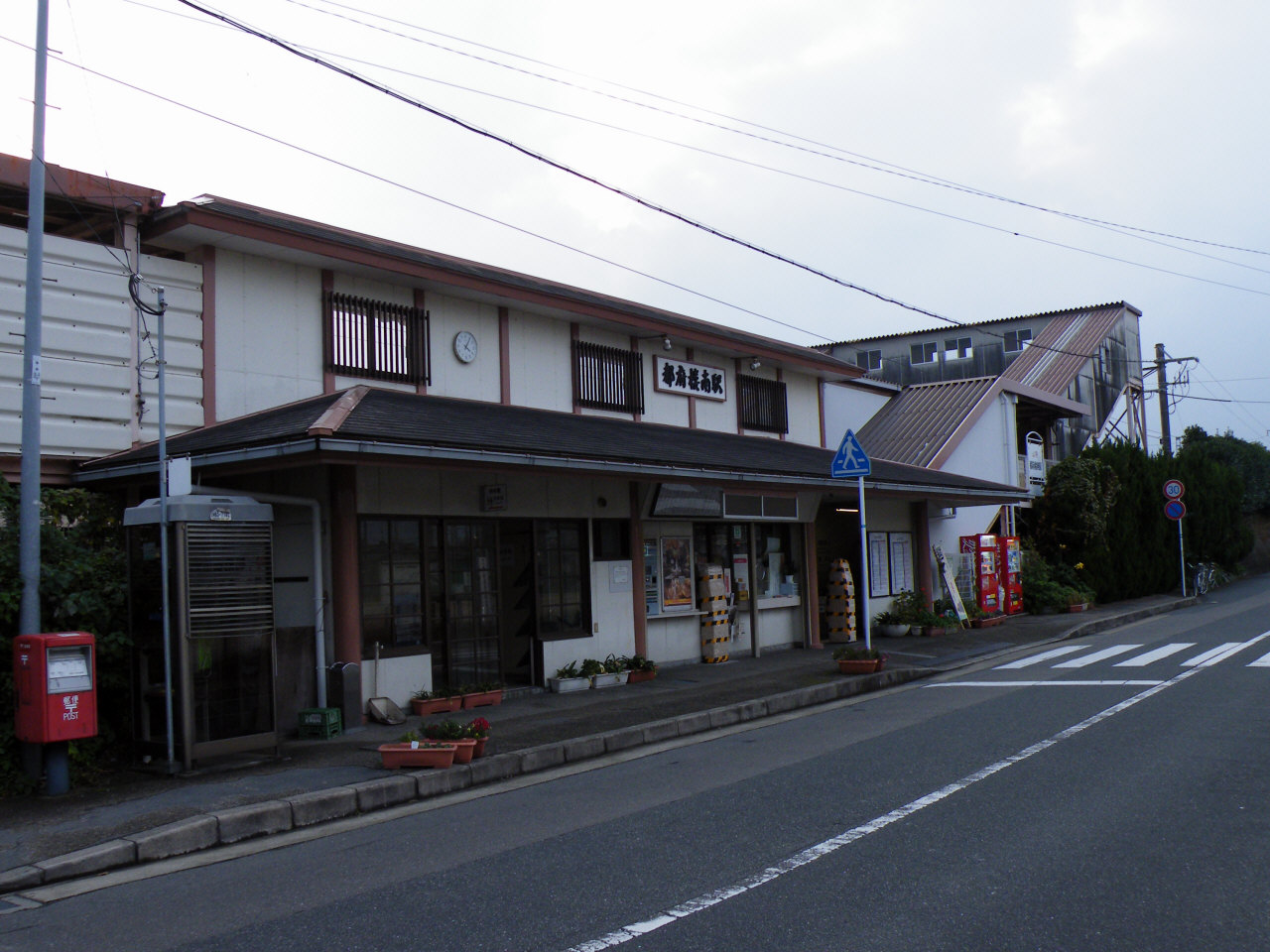

Japanese name
- Shinjitai: 都府楼南駅
- Kyūjitai: 都府樓南驛
- Hiragana: とふろうみなみ

General information
- Location: 3-21-1 Tofurominami, Dazaifu-shi, Fukuoka-ken 818-0105; Japan
- Coordinates: 33°30′12″N 130°30′24″E
- Operator: JR Kyushu
- Line: JB Kagoshima Main Line
- Distance: 91.0 km (56.5 mi) from Mojikō
- Platforms: 2 side platforms
- Tracks: 2

Construction
- Structure type: At grade

Other information
- Status: Unstaffed station (automatic ticket vending machines installed)
- Station code: JB07
- Website: Official website

History
- Opened: 11 March 1989; 37 years ago

Passengers
- 2020: 931 daily

Services
Preceding station	JR Kyushu	Following station
Futsukaichi JB 08 towards Kagoshima	Kagoshima Main Line Local	Mizuki JB 06 towards Mojikō
Location
- Location within Fukuoka Prefecture Location within Japan

Tofurōminami Station (都府楼南駅, Tofurōminami-eki) is a passenger railway station located in the city of Dazaifu, Fukuoka Prefecture, Japan. It is operated by JR Kyushu.

== Lines ==
The station is served by the Kagoshima Main Line and is located 91.0 km from the starting point of the line at Mojikō.

== Layout ==
The station consists of two opposed side platforms serving two tracks. Although it is an unstaffed station, there is an automatic ticket vending machine.

=== Platforms ===
1	■ JB Kagoshima Main Line	for Futsukaichi and Tosu
2	■ JB Kagoshima Main Line	for Hakata and Kokura

== History ==
The station was opened by JR Kyushu on 11 March 1989 as an added station on the existing Kagoshima Main Line track.

== Passenger statistics ==
In fiscal 2020, the station was used by an average of 931 passengers daily (boarding passengers only), and it ranked 142nd among the busiest stations of JR Kyushu.

== Surrounding area ==
- Fukuoka Prefectural Fukuoka Agricultural High School
- Fukuoka Prefectural Musashidai High School

== See also ==
- List of railway stations in Japan
