= Kagoshima Main Line =

Railway line in Japan

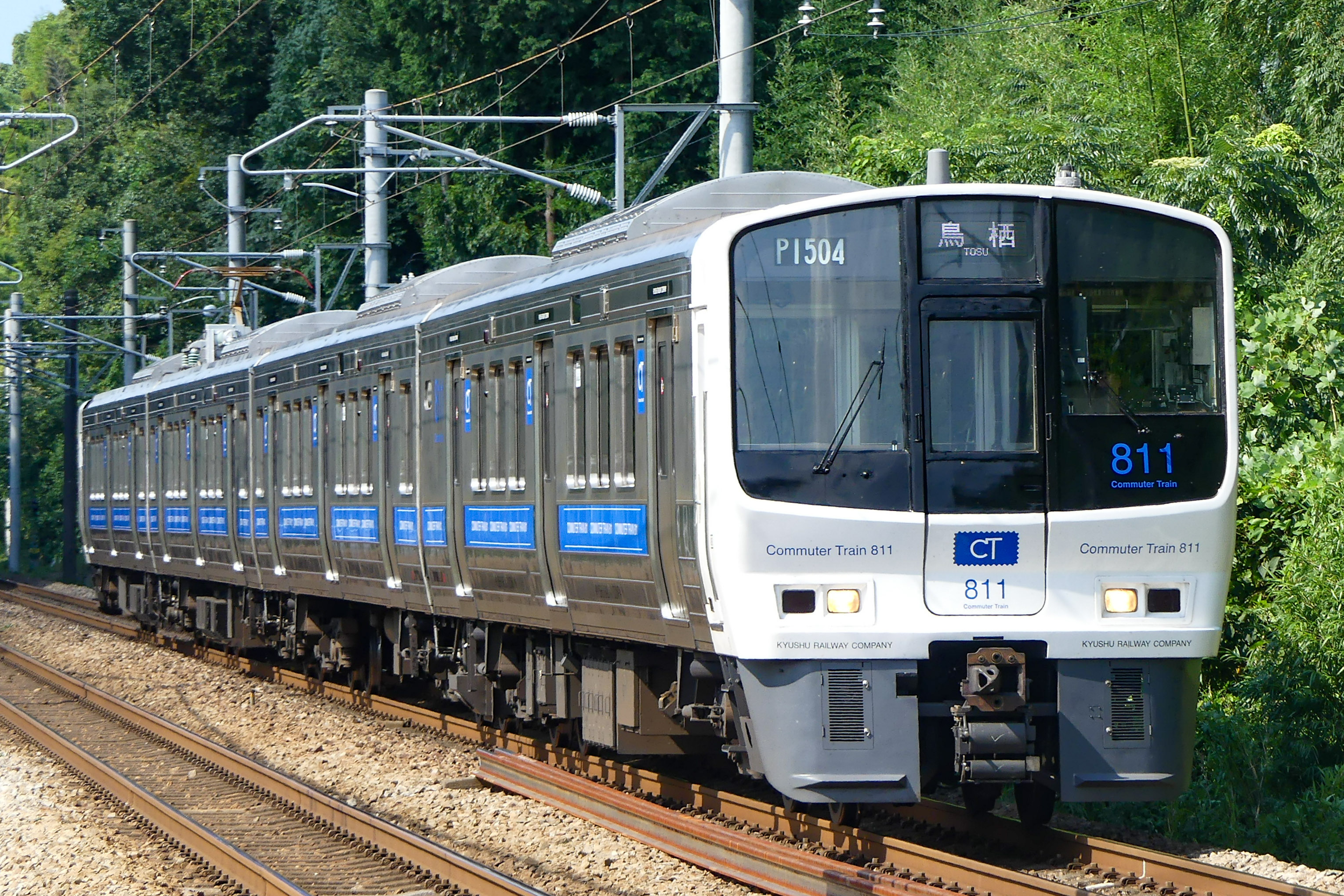
- Local train on the Kagoshima Main Line in August 2017

Overview
- Status: In operation
- Owner: JR Kyushu, JR Freight
- Locale: Fukuoka, Kumamoto and Kagoshima Prefecture
- Termini: Mojikō, Sendai; Yatsushiro, Kagoshima
- Stations: 102

Service
- Type: Heavy rail
- Operator(s): JR Kyushu, JR Freight, Hisatsu Orange Railway
- Rolling stock: 415 series, 811 series, 813 series, 815 series, 817 series, 783 series, 787 series, 883 series, 885 series, KiHa 72, Hisatsu Orange Railway HSOR-100

History
- Opened: 1889; 137 years ago

Technical
- Line length: 285.3 km (177.3 mi)
- Track gauge: 1,067 mm (3 ft 6 in)
- Electrification: 20 kV AC 60 Hz overhead
- Operating speed: 130 km/h (81 mph)
Route map
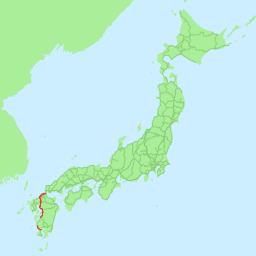

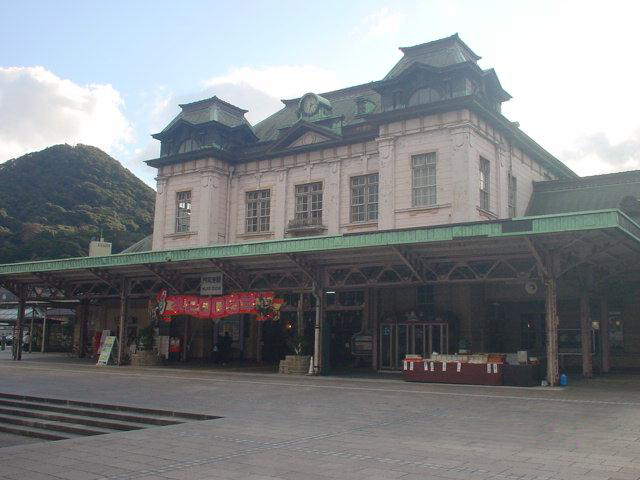
Mojikō station (terminus)

The Kagoshima Main Line (鹿児島本線, Kagoshima-honsen) is a major railway line operated by the Kyushu Railway Company (JR Kyushu) between Mojikō in Kitakyushu, and Kagoshima Station in Kagoshima City, at the southern end of Kyushu. Until March 13, 2004, it extended 393 km (244 mi) between its two termini; however, with the opening of the Kyushu Shinkansen on 13 March, the section between Yatsushiro and Sendai was transferred to the third-sector Hisatsu Orange Railway. The line is important within Kyushu, as it connects Fukuoka (Hakata Station) to many other major cities. It is the main line through the Fukuoka urban district, and as such many long-distance express trains from all parts of Kyushu use the section between Kokura Station (Kitakyushu) and Tosu Station, where the Nagasaki Main Line meets the Kagoshima Main Line.

== Operations ==
=== Rapid Service ===
Rapid Service (快速, Kaisoku) operates mainly during the morning and evening rush hours, as well as at night, between Mojikō and Arao. Some trains stop at Takeshita and Sasabaru during the morning rush hour. On weekends and holidays, some trains also stop at Space World (Space World Station).

=== Regional Rapid Service ===
Regional Rapid Service (区間快速, Kukan-kaisoku) operates between Mojikō and Yatsushiro. Each train has a designated "rapid section", where it makes the same stops as the Rapid Service trains.

=== Local ===
Trains stop at all passenger stations.

== Stations ==
=== From Mojikō to Hakata ===
- Stopping patterns:
  - Local trains stop at all passenger stations.
  - Rapid Service and Regional Rapid Service:
    - ● : All trains stop.
    - | : All trains pass.
    - ★ : Trains outside the rapid section stop.
    - ＊ : Some trains stop on weekends and holidays.
    - ▼ : All trains stop except the Regional Rapid Service bound for Hakata, departing from Kokura at 6:45.
    - ▽ : Only the Regional Rapid Service bound for Hakata, departing from Kokura at 6:45 stops.
- All stations are located in the Fukuoka Prefecture.

No.	Station	Distance in km (mi)		Regional Rapid	Rapid	Transfers	Location	
No.	Station	Between stations	Total	Regional Rapid	Rapid	Transfers	Location	
JA 31	Mojikō 門司港	—N/a	0 (0)	●	●	Mojikō Retro Scenic Line	Moji Ward	Kitakyushu City
JA 30	Komorie 小森江	4.0 (2.5)	4.0 (2.5)	●	●		Moji Ward	Kitakyushu City
JA 29	Moji 門司	1.5 (0.93)	5.5 (3.4)	●	●	JA San'yō Main Line (JA52)	Moji Ward	Kitakyushu City
	Kitakyūshū Freight Terminal (貨）北九州貨物ターミナル	—	6.9 (4.3)	|	|		Moji Ward	Kitakyushu City
	Higashi-Kokura Freight Terminal (貨）東小倉	—	9.4 (5.8)	|	|		Kokurakita Ward	Kitakyushu City
JA 28	Kokura 小倉	5.5 (3.4)	11.0 (6.8)	●	●	San'yō Shinkansen; JA San'yō Main Line (JA51); JF Nippō Main Line (JF01); JI Hitahikosan Line (JI01); Kitakyushu Monorail	Kokurakita Ward	Kitakyushu City
JA 27	Nishi-Kokura 西小倉	0.8 (0.50)	11.8 (7.3)	●	●	JF Nippō Main Line (JF02); JI Hitahikosan Line (JI02)	Kokurakita Ward	Kitakyushu City
	Hama-Kokura Freight Terminal (貨）浜小倉	—	13.4 (8.3)	|	|		Kokurakita Ward	Kitakyushu City
JA 26	Kyūshūkōdai-mae 九州工大前	1.9 (1.2)	15.3 (9.5)	▼	|		Tobata ward	Kitakyushu City
JA 25	Tobata 戸畑	1.9 (1.2)	17.2 (10.7)	●	●		Tobata ward	Kitakyushu City
JA 24	Edamitsu 枝光	2.8 (1.7)	20.0 (12.4)	▼	|		Yahatahigashi ward	Kitakyushu City
JA 23	Space World スペースワールド	1.1 (0.68)	21.1 (13.1)	▼	＊		Yahatahigashi ward	Kitakyushu City
JA 22	Yahata 八幡	1.1 (0.68)	22.2 (13.8)	●	●		Yahatahigashi ward	Kitakyushu City
JA 21	Kurosaki 黒崎	2.7 (1.7)	24.9 (15.5)	●	●	JA Fukuhoku Yutaka Line (Kagoshima Main Line); CK Chikuhō Electric Railroad Line	Yahatanishi ward	Kitakyushu City
	Higashi-Orio Yard 東折尾信号場	—	26.8 (16.7)	|	|		Yahatanishi ward	Kitakyushu City
JA 20	Jinnoharu 陣原	2.2 (1.4)	27.1 (16.8)	▼	|		Yahatanishi ward	Kitakyushu City
JA 19	Orio 折尾	3.0 (1.9)	30.1 (18.7)	●	●	JC Fukuhoku Yutaka Line (Chikuhō Main Line); JE Wakamatsu Line (Chikuhō Main Line)	Yahatanishi ward	Kitakyushu City
JA 18	Mizumaki 水巻	2.1 (1.3)	32.2 (20.0)	★	|		Mizumaki Town	Onga District
JA 17	Ongagawa 遠賀川	2.1 (1.3)	34.3 (21.3)	★	|		Onga Town	Onga District
JA 16	Ebitsu 海老津	5.1 (3.2)	39.4 (24.5)	●	●		Okagaki Town	Onga District
JA 15	Kyōikudai-mae 教育大前	5.2 (3.2)	44.6 (27.7)	★	|		Munakata City	
JA 14	Akama 赤間	1.9 (1.2)	46.5 (28.9)	●	●		Munakata City	
JA 13	Tōgō 東郷	4.2 (2.6)	50.7 (31.5)	●	●		Munakata City	
JA 12	Higashi-Fukuma 東福間	3.2 (2.0)	53.9 (33.5)	★	|		Fukutsu City	
JA 11	Fukuma 福間	2.7 (1.7)	55.6 (34.5)	●	●		Fukutsu City	
JA 10	Chidori 千鳥	1.9 (1.2)	58.5 (36.4)	▽	|		Koga City	
JA 09	Koga 古賀	2.1 (1.3)	60.6 (37.7)	●	●		Koga City	
JA 08	Shishibu ししぶ	1.4 (0.87)	62.0 (38.5)	▽	|		Koga City	
JA 07	Shingū-Chūō 新宮中央	1.4 (0.87)	63.4 (39.4)	▽	|		Shingū Town, Kasuya District	
JA 06	Fukkōdai-mae 福工大前	1.7 (1.1)	65.1 (40.5)	●	●		Higashi Ward	Fukuoka City
JA 05	Kyūsandai-mae 九産大前	3.0 (1.9)	68.1 (42.3)	▽	|		Higashi Ward	Fukuoka City
JA 04	Kashii 香椎	1.7 (1.1)	69.8 (43.4)	●	●	JD Kashii Line	Higashi Ward	Fukuoka City
JA 03	Chihaya 千早	1.2 (0.75)	71.0 (44.1)	●	●	NK Nishitetsu Kaizuka Line (Nishitetsu Chihaya)	Higashi Ward	Fukuoka City
	Chihaya Yard 千早操車場	—	71.3 (44.3)	|	|		Higashi Ward	Fukuoka City
	JR Kaizuka; JR貝塚	—	73.3 (45.5)	|	|	Expected to open in 2027	Higashi Ward	Fukuoka City
JA 02	Hakozaki 箱崎	4.0 (2.5)	75.0 (46.6)	▽	|		Higashi Ward	Fukuoka City
JA 01	Yoshizuka 吉塚	1.4 (0.87)	76.4 (47.5)	●	●	JC Fukuhoku Yutaka Line (JC01)	Hakata Ward	Fukuoka City
00	Hakata 博多	1.8 (1.1)	78.2 (48.6)	●	●	San'yō Shinkansen; Hakataminami Line; Kyūshū Shinkansen; Relay Kamome (Nishi Kyushu Shinkansen connection); JB Kagoshima Main Line (JB00); JC Fukuhoku Yutaka Line (JC00); Airport Line (K11); Nanakuma Line (N18)	Hakata Ward	Fukuoka City

=== From Hakata to Arao ===
- Stopping patterns
  - Local trains stop at all passenger stations.
  - Rapid Service and Regional Rapid Service:
    - ● : All trains stop.
    - | : All trains pass.
    - ★ : Trains outside the rapid section stop.
    - 〇 : Some trains stop during the morning rush hour.

No.	Station	Distance in km (mi)		Regional Rapid	Rapid	Transfers	Location		
No.	Station	Between stations	Total	Regional Rapid	Rapid	Transfers	Location		
00	Hakata	—N/a	78.2 (48.6)	●	●	San'yō Shinkansen; Hakataminami Line; Kyūshū Shinkansen; Relay Kamome (Nishi Kyushu Shinkansen connection); JA Kagoshima Main Line (JA00); JC Fukuhoku Yutaka Line (JC00); Airport Line (K11); Nanakuma Line (N18)	Hakata Ward	Fukuoka City	Fukuoka Prefecture
JB 01	Takeshita	2.7 (1.7)	80.9 (50.3)	★	〇		Hakata Ward	Fukuoka City	Fukuoka Prefecture
JB 02	Sasabaru	2.4 (1.5)	83.3 (51.8)	★	〇		Minami Ward	Fukuoka City	Fukuoka Prefecture
JB 03	Minami-Fukuoka	1.6 (0.99)	84.9 (52.8)	●	●		Hakata Ward	Fukuoka City	Fukuoka Prefecture
JB 04	Kasuga	1.2 (0.75)	86.1 (53.5)	|	|		Kasuga City		Fukuoka Prefecture
JB 05	Ōnojō	1.3 (0.81)	87.4 (54.3)	●	●		Ōnojō City		Fukuoka Prefecture
JB 06	Mizuki	1.4 (0.87)	88.8 (55.2)	|	|		Ōnojō City		Fukuoka Prefecture
JB 07	Tofurōminami	2.2 (1.4)	91.0 (56.5)	|	|		Dazaifu City		Fukuoka Prefecture
JB 08	Futsukaichi	1.4 (0.87)	92.4 (57.4)	●	●		Chikushino City		Fukuoka Prefecture
JB 09	Tempaizan	1.9 (1.2)	94.3 (58.6)	★	|		Chikushino City		Fukuoka Prefecture
JB 10	Haruda	3.6 (2.2)	97.9 (60.8)	●	●	JG Haruda Line (Chikuhō Main Line)	Chikushino City		Fukuoka Prefecture
JB 11	Keyakidai	2.0 (1.2)	99.9 (62.1)	★	|		Kiyama Town, Miyaki District		Saga Prefecture
JB 12	Kiyama	1.5 (0.93)	101.4 (63.0)	●	●	Amagi Railway; Amagi Line	Kiyama Town, Miyaki District		Saga Prefecture
JB 13	Yayoigaoka	2.1 (1.3)	103.5 (64.3)	★	|		Tosu City		Saga Prefecture
JB 14	Tashiro	2.1 (1.3)	105.6 (65.6)	★	|		Tosu City		Saga Prefecture
	Tosu Freight Terminal	—N/a	105.6 (65.6)	|	|		Tosu City		Saga Prefecture
JB 15	Tosu	1.2 (0.75)	106.8 (66.4)	●	●	JH Nagasaki Main Line	Tosu City		Saga Prefecture
JB 16	Hizen-Asahi	3.6 (2.2)	110.4 (68.6)	★	|		Tosu City		Saga Prefecture
JB 17	Kurume	3.5 (2.2)	113.9 (70.8)	●	●	Kyūshū Shinkansen ■ Kyūdai Main Line (Yufu Kōgen Line)	Kurume City		Fukuoka Prefecture
JB 18	Araki	4.9 (3.0)	118.8 (73.8)	●	●		Kurume City		Fukuoka Prefecture
JB 19	Nishimuta	3.8 (2.4)	122.6 (76.2)	★	|		Chikugo City		Fukuoka Prefecture
JB 20	Hainuzuka	3.5 (2.2)	126.1 (78.4)	●	●		Chikugo City		Fukuoka Prefecture
JB 21	Chikugo-Funagoya	3.6 (2.2)	129.7 (80.6)	●	●	Kyūshū Shinkansen	Chikugo City		Fukuoka Prefecture
JB 22	Setaka	2.5 (1.6)	132.2 (82.1)	●	●		Miyama City		Fukuoka Prefecture
JB 23	Minami-Setaka	3.0 (1.9)	135.2 (84.0)	★	|		Miyama City		Fukuoka Prefecture
JB 24	Wataze	3.9 (2.4)	139.1 (86.4)	★	|		Miyama City		Fukuoka Prefecture
JB 25	Yoshino	2.8 (1.7)	141.9 (88.2)	★	|		Ōmuta City		Fukuoka Prefecture
JB 26	Ginsui	2.4 (1.5)	144.3 (89.7)	★	|		Ōmuta City		Fukuoka Prefecture
JB 27	Ōmuta	3.2 (2.0)	147.5 (91.7)	●	●	T Tenjin Ōmuta Line	Ōmuta City		Fukuoka Prefecture
JB 28	Arao	4.1 (2.5)	151.6 (94.2)	●	●	■ Kagoshima Main Line	Arao City, Kumamoto Prefecture		

=== From Arao to Yatsushiro ===
- Stopping patterns:
  - Local and Regional Rapid Service trains stop at all passenger stations in this section.
- All stations are located in Kumamoto Prefecture.

Station	Distance in km (mi)		Transfers	Location	
Station	Between stations	Total	Transfers	Location	
Arao	4.1 (2.5)	151.6 (94.2)	JB Kagoshima Main Line	Arao City	
Minami-Arao	3.2 (2.0)	154.8 (96.2)		Arao City	
Nagasu	4.6 (2.9)	159.4 (99.0)		Nagasu Town, Tamana District	
Ōnoshimo	4.7 (2.9)	164.1 (102.0)		Tamana City	
Tamana	4.5 (2.8)	168.6 (104.8)		Tamana City	
Higo-Ikura	4.2 (2.6)	172.8 (107.4)		Tamana City	
Konoha	3.9 (2.4)	176.7 (109.8)		Gyokutō Town, Tamana District	
Tabaruzaka	3.5 (2.2)	180.2 (112.0)		Kita Ward	Kumamoto City
Ueki	4.4 (2.7)	184.6 (114.7)		Kita Ward	Kumamoto City
Nishisato	4.2 (2.6)	188.8 (117.3)		Kita Ward	Kumamoto City
Sōjōdaigakumae	2.9 (1.8)	191.7 (119.1)		Nishi Ward	Kumamoto City
Kami-Kumamoto	1.6 (0.99)	193.3 (120.1)	Kumamoto City Tram Kami-Kumamoto Line; Kumamoto Electric Railway Kikuchi Line	Nishi Ward	Kumamoto City
Kumamoto	3.3 (2.1)	196.6 (122.2)	Kyūshū Shinkansen ■ Hōhi Main Line; Kumamoto City Tram Trunk Line; Kumamoto City Tram Tasaki Line	Nishi Ward	Kumamoto City
Nishi-Kumamoto	3.2 (2.0)	199.8 (124.1)		Minami Ward	Kumamoto City
Kawashiri	2.1 (1.3)	201.9 (125.5)		Minami Ward	Kumamoto City
Tomiai	3.4 (2.1)	205.3 (127.6)		Minami Ward	Kumamoto City
Uto	2.2 (1.4)	207.5 (128.9)	■ Misumi Line (Amakusa Misumi Line)	Uto City	
Matsubase	4.8 (3.0)	212.3 (131.9)		Uki City	
Ogawa	6.2 (3.9)	218.5 (135.8)		Uki City	
Arisa	5.0 (3.1)	223.5 (138.9)		Yatsushiro City	
Senchō	4.1 (2.5)	227.6 (141.4)		Yatsushiro City	
Shin-Yatsushiro	1.9 (1.2)	229.5 (142.6)	Kyūshū Shinkansen	Yatsushiro City	
Yatsushiro	2.8 (1.7)	232.3 (144.3)	■ Hisatsu Line (Ebino Kōgen Line); Hisatsu Orange Railway Line (OR01)	Yatsushiro City	

=== Former Yatsushiro – Sendai section ===
This section was transferred to the Hisatsu Orange Railway on 13 March 2004. Some through services continue to operate over this section.

=== From Sendai to Kagoshima ===
- Stopping patterns:
  - Trains stop at all passenger stations in this section.
- Track symbols:
  - || : Double-track section.
  - | : Single-track section.
  - ◇ : Passing loop at station in a single-track section.
  - ∨ : Double-track section ends.
  - ∧ : Double-track section begins.
- All stations are located in the Kagoshima Prefecture.

Station	Distance in km (mi)			Transfers	Tracks	Location
Station	Between stations	From Sendai	From Mojikō	Transfers	Tracks	Location
Sendai	—N/a	0 (0)	349.2 (217.0)	Kyūshū Shinkansen; Hisatsu Orange Railway Line (OR28)	◇	Satsumasendai City
Kumanojō	2.6 (1.6)	2.6 (1.6)	351.8 (218.6)		◇	Satsumasendai City
Kobanchaya	3.1 (1.9)	5.7 (3.5)	354.9 (220.5)		∧	Satsumasendai City
Kushikino	6.3 (3.9)	12.0 (7.5)	361.2 (224.4)		∨	Ichikikushikino City
Kamimuragakuenmae	2.2 (1.4)	14.2 (8.8)			|	Ichikikushikino City
Ichiki	2.4 (1.5)	16.6 (10.3)	365.8 (227.3)		◇	Ichikikushikino City
Yunomoto	3.8 (2.4)	20.4 (12.7)	369.6 (229.7)		◇	Hioki City
Higashi-Ichiki	2.5 (1.6)	22.9 (14.2)	372.1 (231.2)		∧	Hioki City
Ijūin	5.9 (3.7)	28.8 (17.9)	378.0 (234.9)		||	Hioki City
Satsuma-Matsumoto	5.3 (3.3)	34.1 (21.2)	383.3 (238.2)		||	Kagoshima City
Kami-Ijūin	2.4 (1.5)	36.5 (22.7)	385.7 (239.7)		||	Kagoshima City
Hiroki	5.0 (3.1)	41.5 (25.8)			||	Kagoshima City
Kagoshima-Chūō	4.6 (2.9)	46.1 (28.6)	395.3 (245.6)	Kyūshū Shinkansen ■ Ibusuki Makurazaki Line ■ Nippō Main Line; Kagoshima City Tram Dai-Niki Line; Kagoshima City Tram Toso Line	||	Kagoshima City
Kagoshima	3.2 (2.0)	49.3 (30.6)	398.5 (247.6)	■ Nippō Main Line; Kagoshima City Tram Dai-Ikki Line	∨	Kagoshima City
Kagoshima Freight Terminal		49.3 (30.6)	398.5 (247.6)		∨	Kagoshima City

== History ==
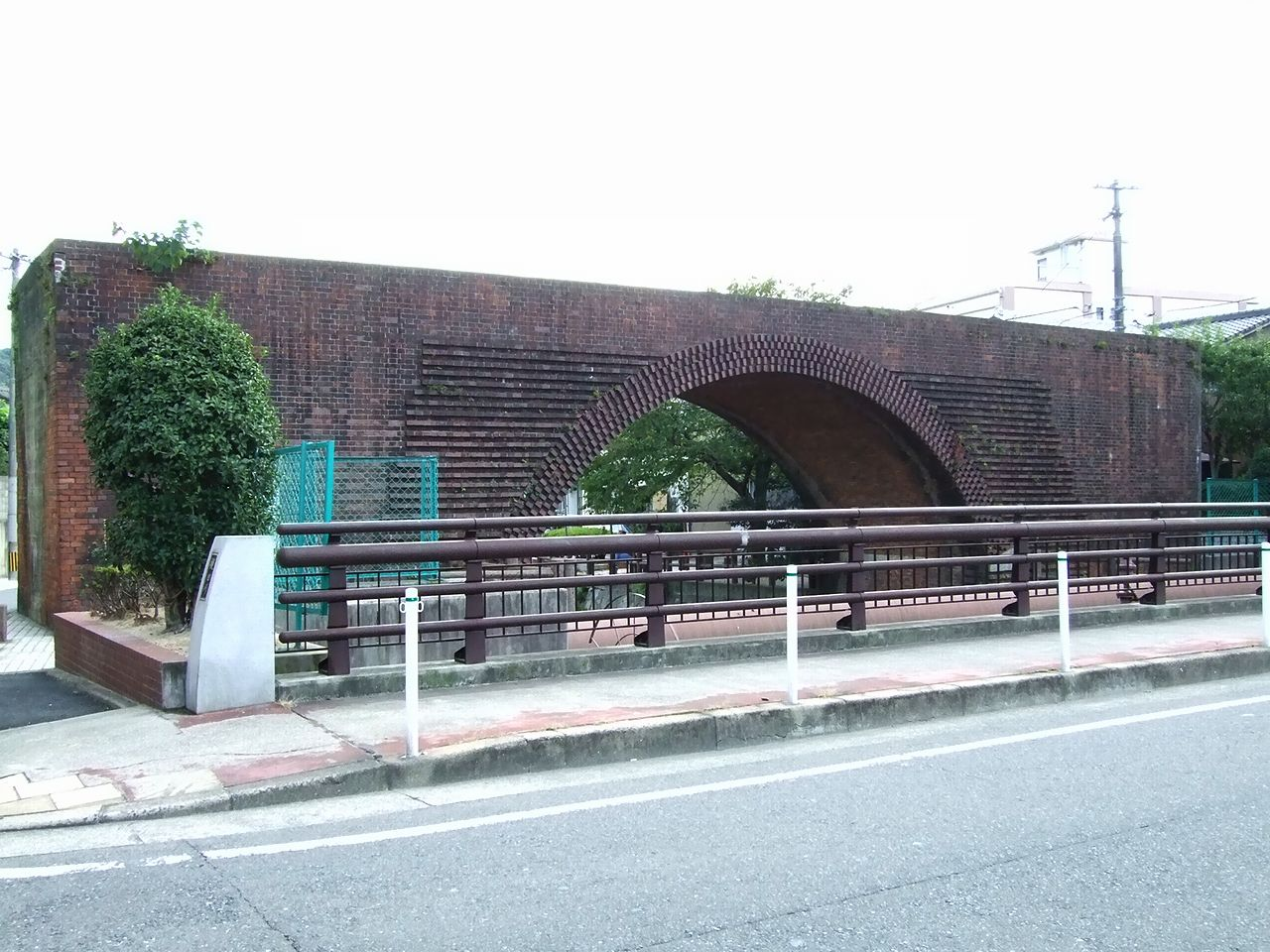
The Okura line arch bridge remains after over 100 years since the line closed

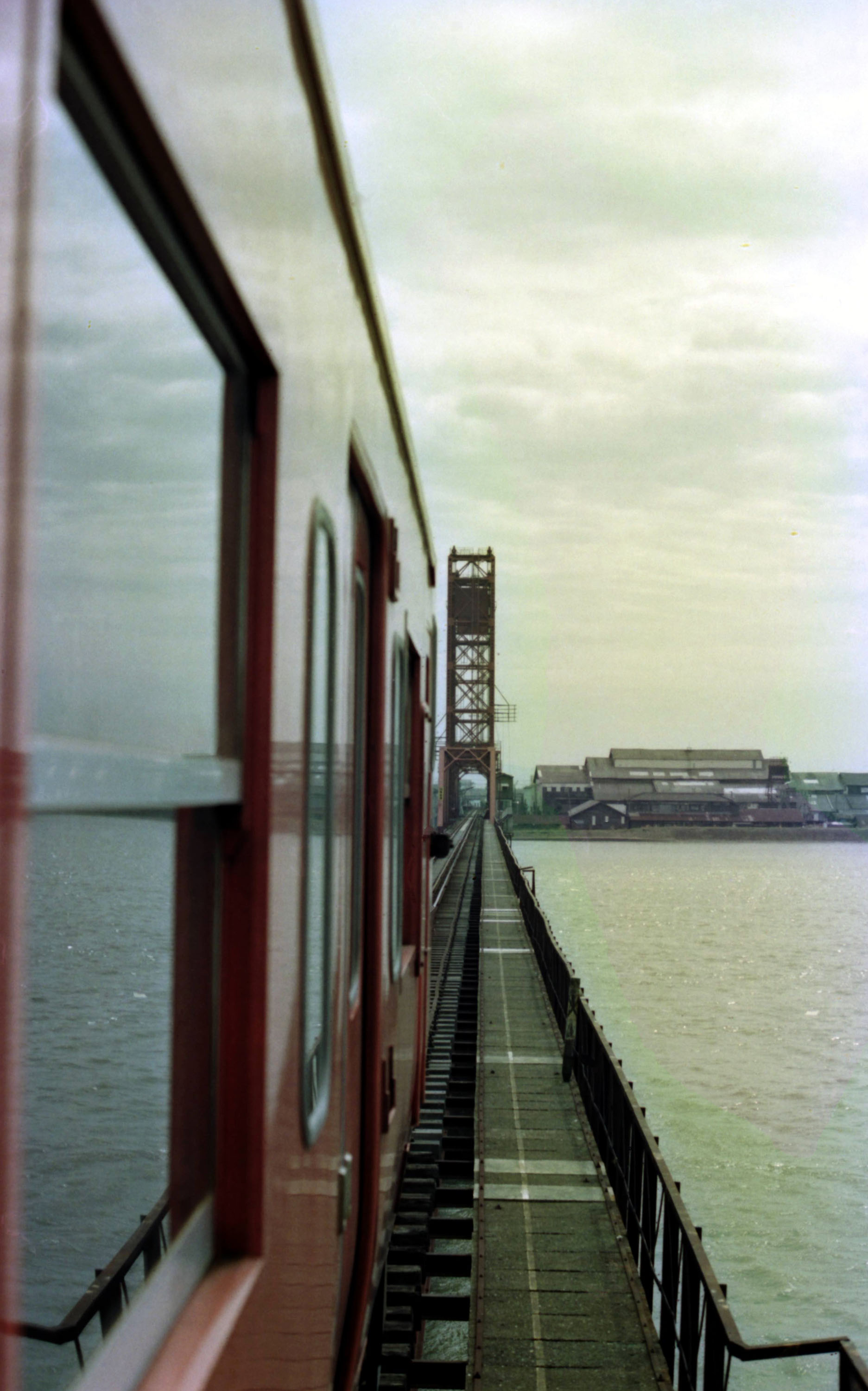
Chikugogawa Bridge on the Saga line in 1981

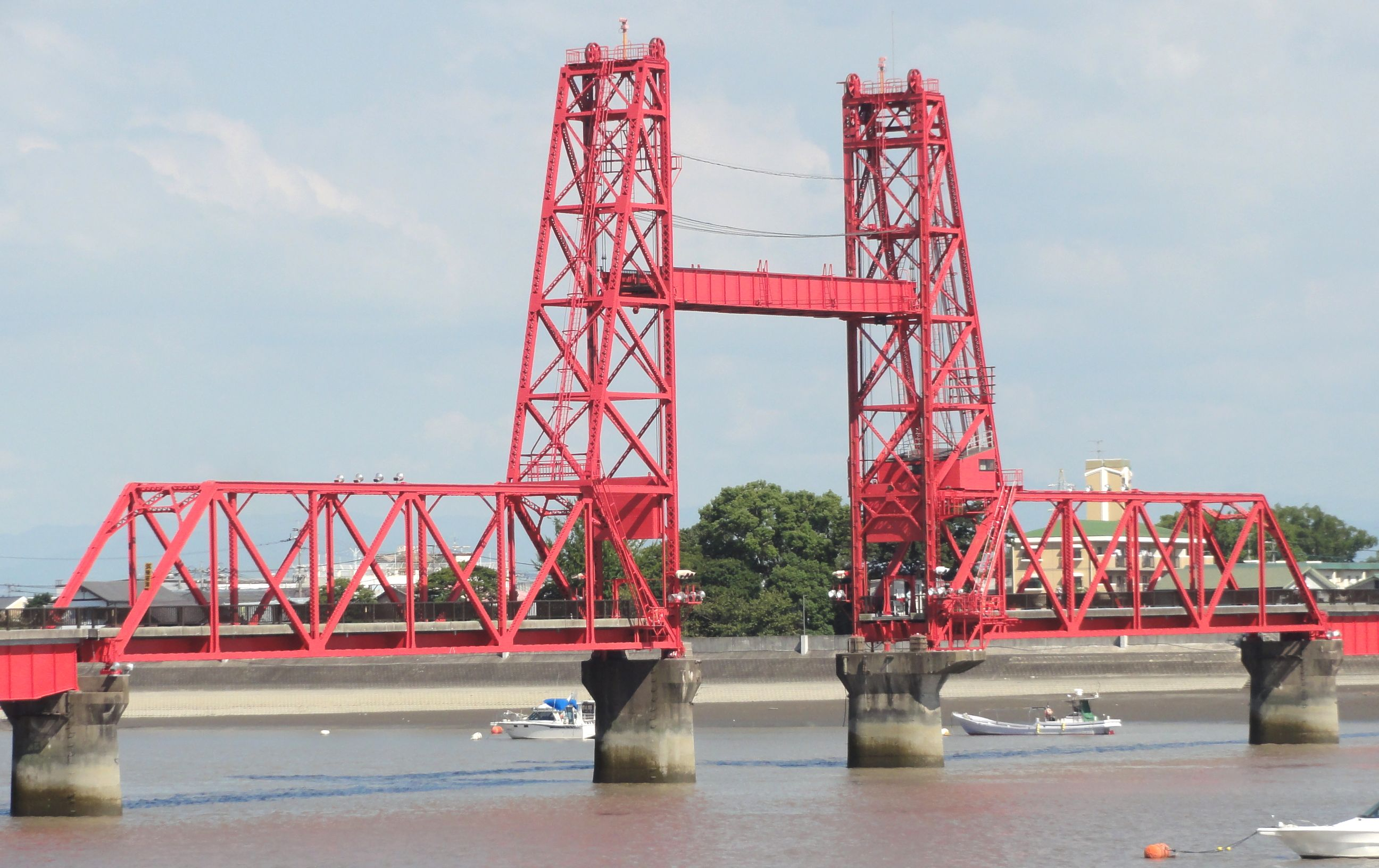
The heritage listed Chikugogawa Bridge on the Saga line

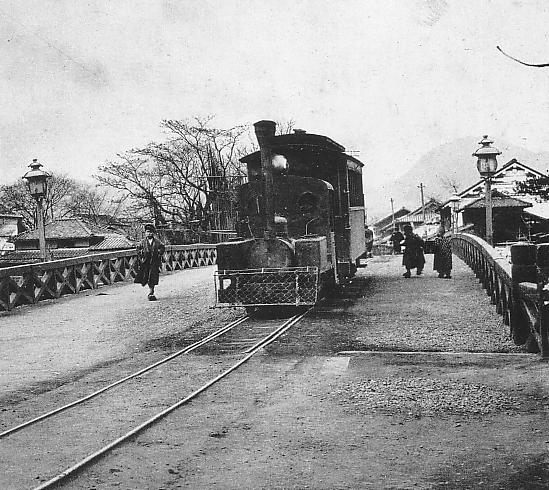
Kumamoto Light Railway

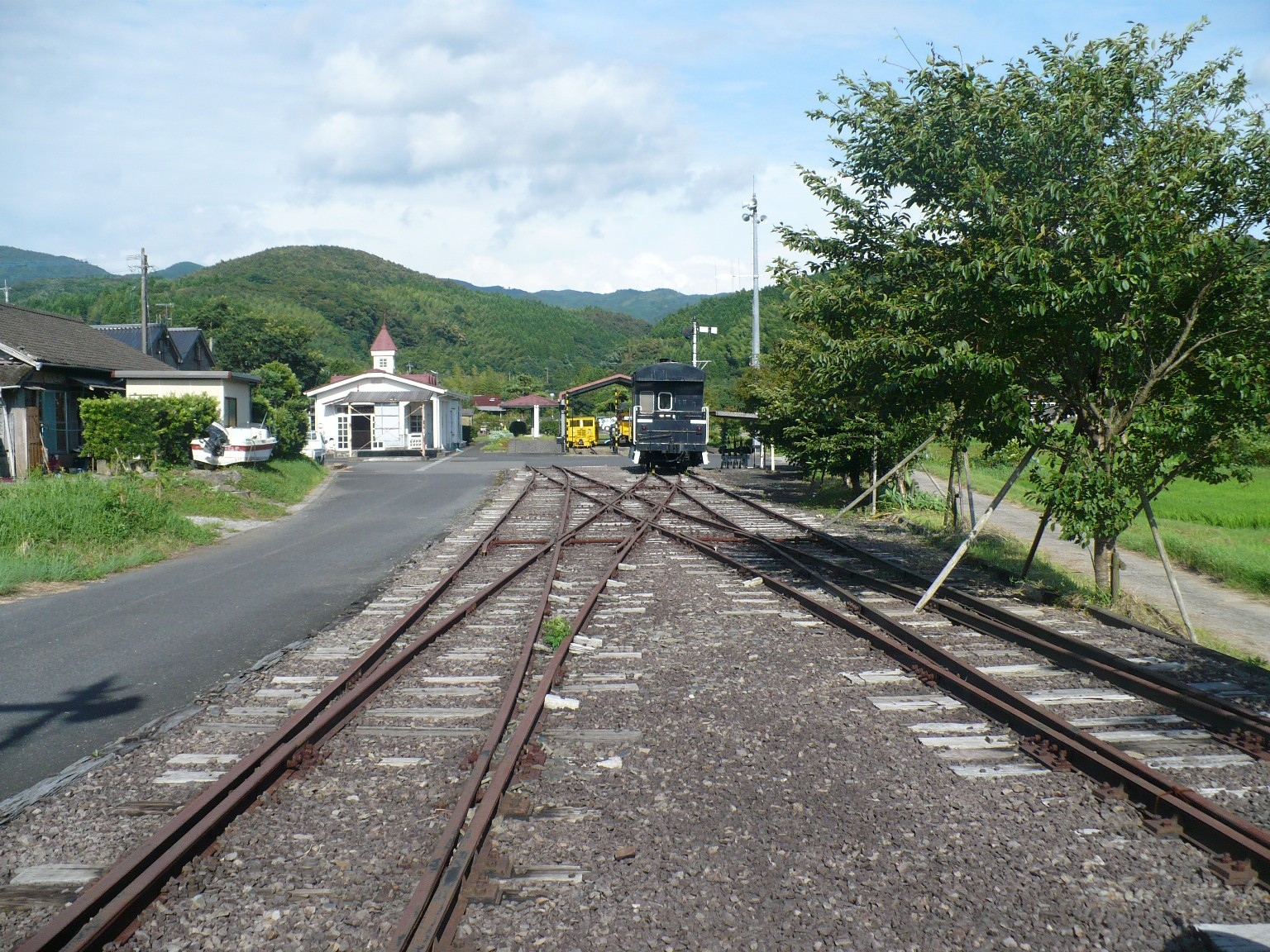
Satsuma Nagano station on the Miyanojo line, a reversing (or dead end) line arrangement

The Kyushu Railway opened the 197 km Mojiko - Hakata - Kumamoto section between 1889 and 1891, extended the line south to Yatsushiro by 1896 and the company was nationalised in 1907.

At the southern end the line from Kagoshima to Hayato (now part of the Nippo Main Line) opened as part of the Hisatsu Line in 1901. The Hayato to Yoshimatsu section of the Hisatsu line opened in 1903, the Yatsushiro to Hitoyoshi section opened in 1908, and the Hitoyoshi to Yoshimatsu section in 1909, providing the original connection from Kagoshima to Yatsushiro.

The Kagoshima to Sendai line opened between 1913 and 1914, and the Sendai to Yatsushiro section opened between 1922 and 1927, at which time this route replaced the Hisatsu Line to become the southern part of the Kagoshima Main Line.

In 2004, following the opening of the Kagoshima to Shin-Yatsushiro section of the Kyushu Shinkansen, the Yatsushiro to Sendai section was transferred to the third-sector Hisatsu Orange Railway.

=== Duplication ===
The Moji to Kokura section was double-tracked in 1897. The 14 km Kokura to Kurosaki section (on a new alignment to the west of the original line) opened in 1908, and was completed to Hakata by 1913. The line was double-tracked south of Hakata to Tosu between 1917 and 1921, with Tosu to Hizen Asahi opening 1934, and to Kurume in 1942.

The next section to Araki was double-tracked in 1961, to Kumamoto in 1968 and Yatsushiro in 1970. The Yunoura to Tsunagi section was double-tracked between 1966 and 1968. The line was double-tracked from Kagoshima to Higashichiki between 1969 and 1980.

=== Former connecting lines ===
The original Kokura to Kurosaki alignment avoided the coastline due to the Japanese army expressing concern at the vulnerability of a coastal route to enemy naval gunfire. A 3 km "Kokura Bypass" line (junctioning 2 km north of Kokura) to the Nippo Main Line was opened in 1903 for the same reason. However, following Japan's success in the 1904 Russo-Japanese War, this concern diminished and the Kokura to Kurosaki section was rebuilt (and duplicated) on a new easier (though 3 km longer) alignment to the west of the original line in 1908. The original 11 km section was then renamed the Okura Line and operated until 1911, when it closed together with the Kokura Bypass line.

- Ongagawa Station: An 11 km line to Muroki operated between 1908 and 1985. A 6 km 762 mm (2 ft 6 in) gauge line to Nishiashiya operated from 1915 to 1932. The Ashiya airfield was occupied by the USAF in 1945, and a 1,067 mm (3 ft 6 in) gauge line was built on the formation of the 762 mm gauge line to serve the airfield in 1947. Trains were mixed (i.e. freight wagons with a passenger car attached) and only available to US military personnel until 1950. The Korean War extended the use of the airfield by the USAF, and the line closed in 1961.
- Yoshizuka Station: A 14 km line to Chikuzenkatsuta opened between 1918 and 1919, hauling coal until the mine closed in 1965. The line closed in 1985.
- Futsukaichi Station: A 26 km light railway to Amagi operated between 1908 and 1940.
- Hainuzuka Station: The 20 km Yabe Line to Kuroki opened as a 915 mm (3 ft) gauge line in 1903, closing in 1940. The line was rebuilt as a 1,067 mm gauge line in 1945. Freight services ceased in 1978, and the line closed in 1985.
- Setaka Station: A 24 km line to Saga (on the Nagasaki Main Line) opened between 1931 and 1935, and closed in 1987. This line crossed three major watercourses by substantial bridges. The Kyushu Fertiliser Co. operated a 14 km line to Nankan from 1921 until 1938. The 8 km 915 mm (3 ft) gauge line to Yanagawa line operated from 1911 until 1932.
- Omuta Station: The Mitsui Mining Co. opened a 19 km line to Miike-ko coal mine in 1891. Two branch lines, 4 and 3 km long, were subsequently opened, closing in 1985 and 1969 respectively. Passenger services ceased in 1984. The majority of the system closed in 1997, when the coal fired power stations at Omuta supplied by the line converted to oil, with a 2 km section to Miyaura freight yard remaining to serve a chemical plant.
- Arao Station: A 5 km line to Midorigaoka, electrified at 500 V DC, operated from 1949 until 1964.
- Ueki Station: A 20 km line to Yamaga operated from 1917 until 1965.
- Kamikumamoto: The 22 km 762 mm (2 ft 6 in) gauge Kumamoto Light Railway to Otsu opened between 1907 and 1914, with a 2.4 km branch to Suizenji. Despite proposals to regauge the line to 1,067 mm (3 ft 6 in) gauge and electrify it, the anticipated development of the area did not occur at an acceptable rate and the line was closed in 1921.
- Minamata Station: The first section of the Yamano line was opened from Kurino (on the Hisatsu Line) 24 km to Yamano in 1921. The 14 km Minamata to Kugino section opened in 1934, and the 10 km Yamano to Satsuma section the following year. In 1937, the 8 km Kugino to Satsuma section, including the Okawa spiral opened. Freight services ceased in 1986, and the line closed in 1988.
- Sendai Station: The Kawamiya Railway commenced construction of a line towards Satsumaoguchi (on the Yamano line) in 1917. Construction was suspended in 1921, and the company was nationalised in 1923. Construction (as the Miyanojo Line) recommenced that year, and the 66 km line opened in stages between 1924 and 1937, closing in 1987.
- Kami Ijuin Station: The Kagoshima Prefectural Government opened a 50 km line to Makurazaki between 1914 and 1931. The JR Ibusuki Makurazaki Line connected when it opened in 1963. The line was closed in 1984 following landslides caused by torrential rain. It had two branch lines: the 16 km Ata to Chiran line opened between 1927 and 1930, and closed by landslides in 1965; and the 3 km Kaseda to Satsuma Man-sei line operated between 1916 and 1962.
