= Tenpaizan Station =

Railway station in Chikushino, Fukuoka Prefecture, Japan

JB 09 Tenpaizan Station 天拝山駅
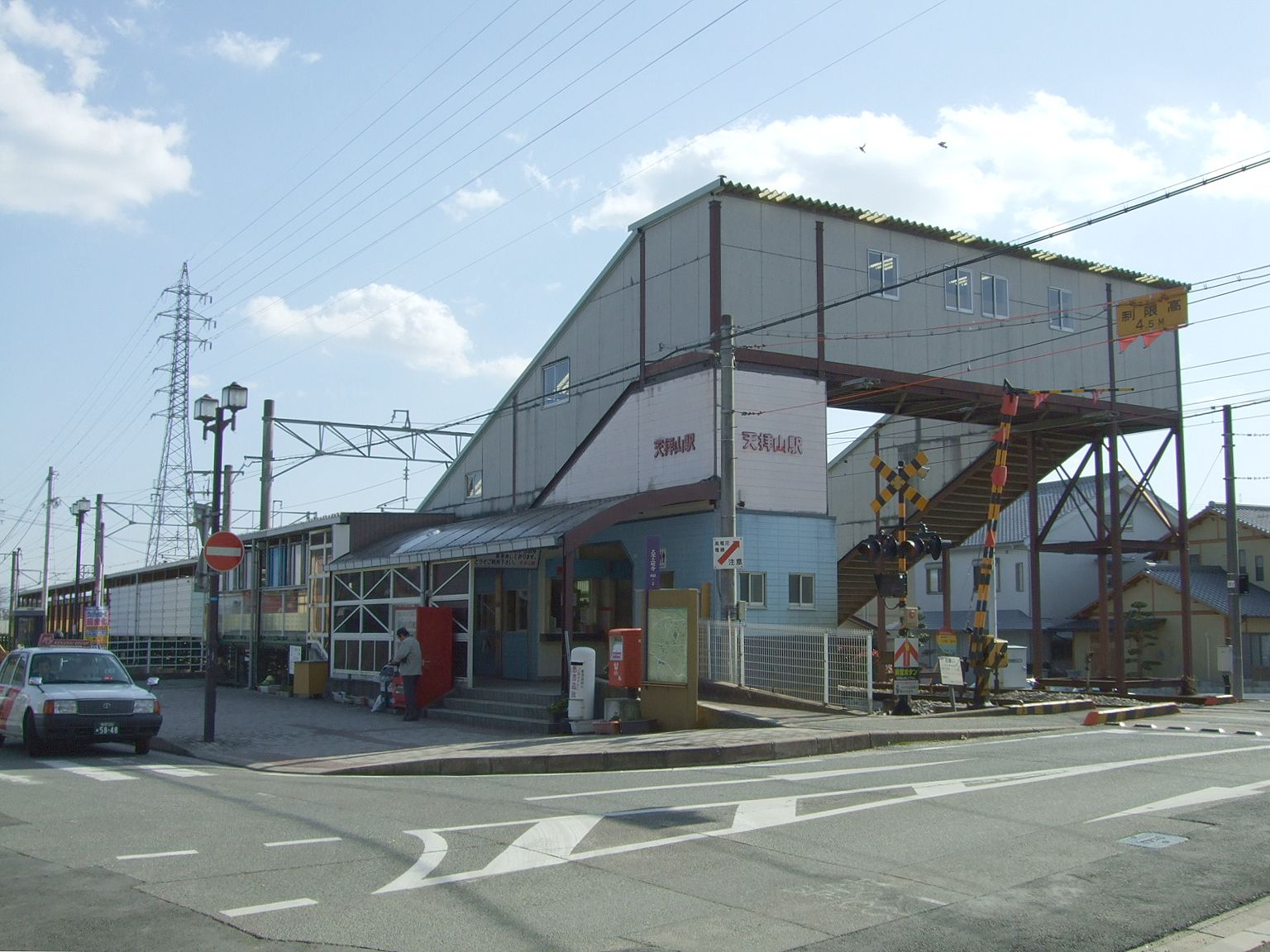
- Tenpaizan Station

General information
- Location: 643-2 Ryumyoji, Chikushino-shi, Fukuoka-ken 818-0042; Japan
- Coordinates: 33°28′55″N 130°31′49″E
- Operator: JR Kyushu
- Line: JB Kagoshima Main Line
- Distance: 94.3 km from Mojikō
- Platforms: 2 side platforms
- Tracks: 2

Construction
- Structure type: At grade

Other information
- Status: Unstaffed
- Website: Official website

History
- Opened: 11 March 1989

Passengers
- FY2020: 2166 daily
- Rank: 64th (among JR Kyushu stations)

Services
Preceding station	JR Kyushu	Following station
Haruda towards Kagoshima	Kagoshima Main Line	Futsukaichi towards Mojikō
Location
- Location within Fukuoka Prefecture Location within Japan

Tenpaizan Station (天拝山駅, Tenpaizan-eki) is a passenger railway station located in the city of Chikushino, Fukuoka Prefecture, Japan. It is operated by JR Kyushu. It is named after the local Mount Tenpai, on the route of a long distance Kyūshū hiking trail.

== Lines ==
The station is served by the Kagoshima Main Line and is located 94.3 km from the starting point of the line at Mojikō.

== Layout ==
The station consists of two opposed side platforms serving two tracks, connected by a footbridge. The station is unattended.

=== Platforms ===
1	■ JB Kagoshima Main Line	for Kurume and Ōmuta
2	■ JB Kagoshima Main Line	for Hakata and Kokura

== History ==
The station was opened by JR Kyushu on 11 March 1989 as an added station on the existing Kagoshima Main Line track.

== Passenger statistics ==
In fiscal 2020, the station was used by an average of 2166 passengers daily (boarding passengers only), and it ranked 64th among the busiest stations of JR Kyushu.

== Surrounding area ==
- Chikushino City Hall
- Fukuoka Prefectural Chikushi High School
- Chikushino City Chikushino Junior High School
- Fukuoka Prefectural Fukuoka Visual Special Needs School
- Nishitetsu Tenjin Omuta Line Asakura Kaido Station

== See also ==
- List of railway stations in Japan
