= Arisa Station =

Railway station in Yatsushiro, Kumamoto Prefecture, Japan

Arisa Station 有佐駅
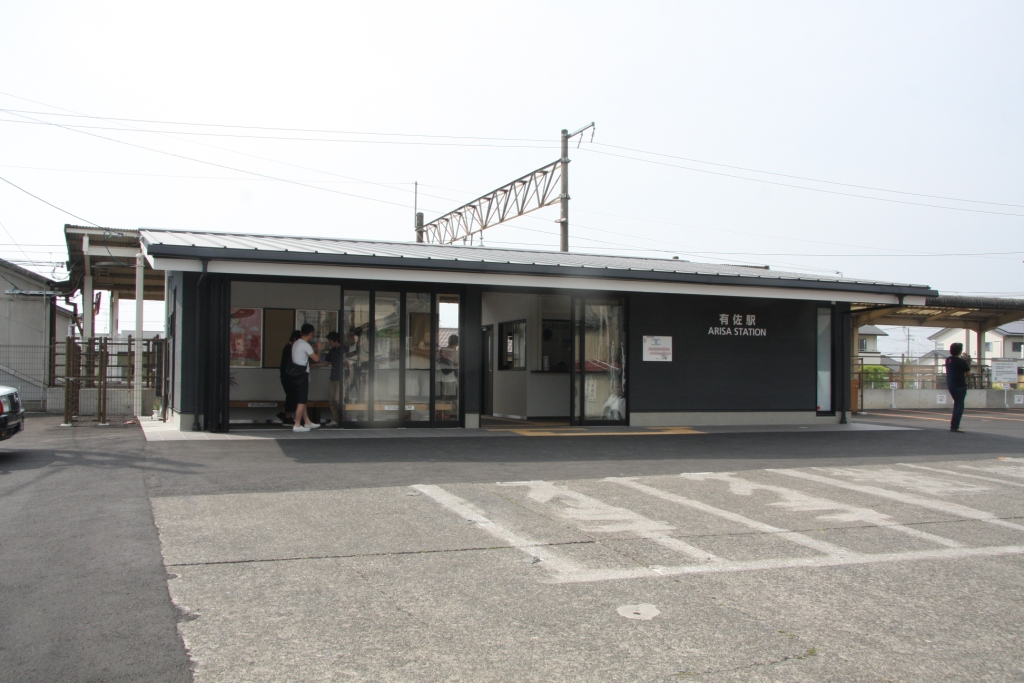
- Arisa Station in 2014

General information
- Location: 151-2, Arisa, Yatsushiro-shi, Kumamoto-ken 869-4212; Japan
- Coordinates: 32°33′45.87″N 130°40′13.72″E
- Operator: JR Kyushu
- Line: ■ Kagoshima Main Line
- Platforms: 1 side + 1 island platform
- Tracks: 3

Construction
- Structure type: At grade

Other information
- Website: Official website

History
- Opened: 21 November 1896

Passengers
- FY2020: 723 daily
- Rank: 179th (among JR Kyushu stations)

Services
Preceding station	JR Kyushu	Following station
Senchō towards Kagoshima	Kagoshima Main Line	Ogawa towards Mojikō
Location
- Location within Kumamoto Prefecture Location within Japan

Arisa Station (有佐駅, Arisa-eki) is a passenger railway station located in the city of Yatsushiro, Kumamoto Prefecture, Japan. It is operated by JR Kyushu.

== Lines ==
The station is served by the Kagoshima Main Line and is located 223.5 km from the starting point of the line at Mojiko.

== Layout ==
The station consists of one side platform and one island platform connected by an overpass. The station building is on the east side, but there is an underground passage on the uphill side, so it is possible to go to the west side as well. The station is unattended.

=== Platforms ===
1	■ ■ Kagoshima Main Line	for Shin-Yatsushiro and Yatsushiro
2, 3	■ ■ Kagoshima Main Line	for Kumamoto

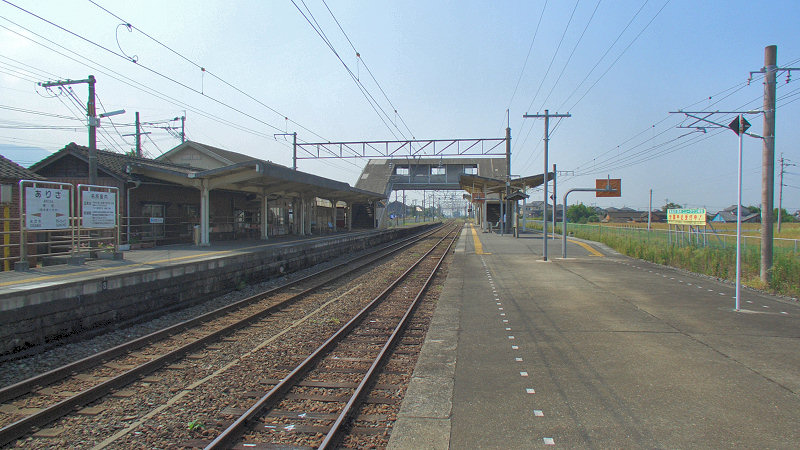
Tracks and footbridge

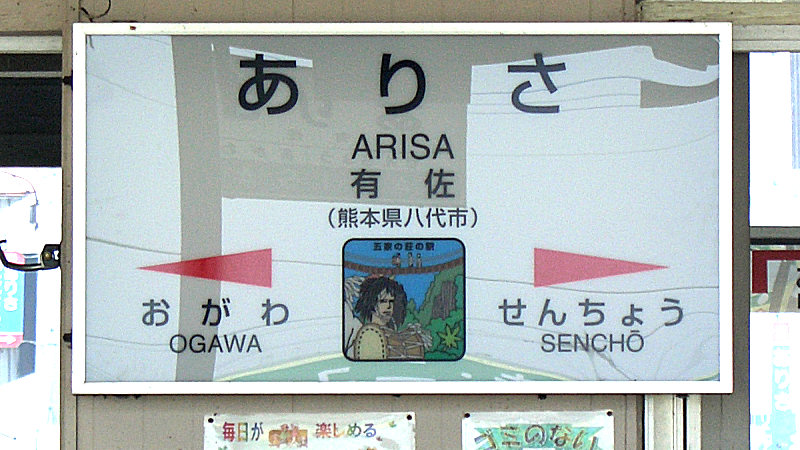
Signage

== History ==
Arisa Station was opened on 21 November 1896 as a station on the Kyushu Railway, which was nationalized in 1907. After the privatization of the Japanese National Railways (JNR) on 1 April 1987, the station came under JR Kyushu.

== Passenger statistics ==
In fiscal 2020, the station was used by an average of 723 passengers daily (boarding passengers only), and it ranked 179th among the busiest stations of JR Kyushu.

== See also ==
- List of railway stations in Japan

== Surrounding area ==
- Yatsushiro Municipal Kagami Elementary School
- Kumamoto Prefectural Yatsushiro Agricultural High School
