= Kasuga Station (Fukuoka) =

Railway station in Kasuga, Fukuoka Prefecture, Japan

JB 04 Kasuga Station 春日駅
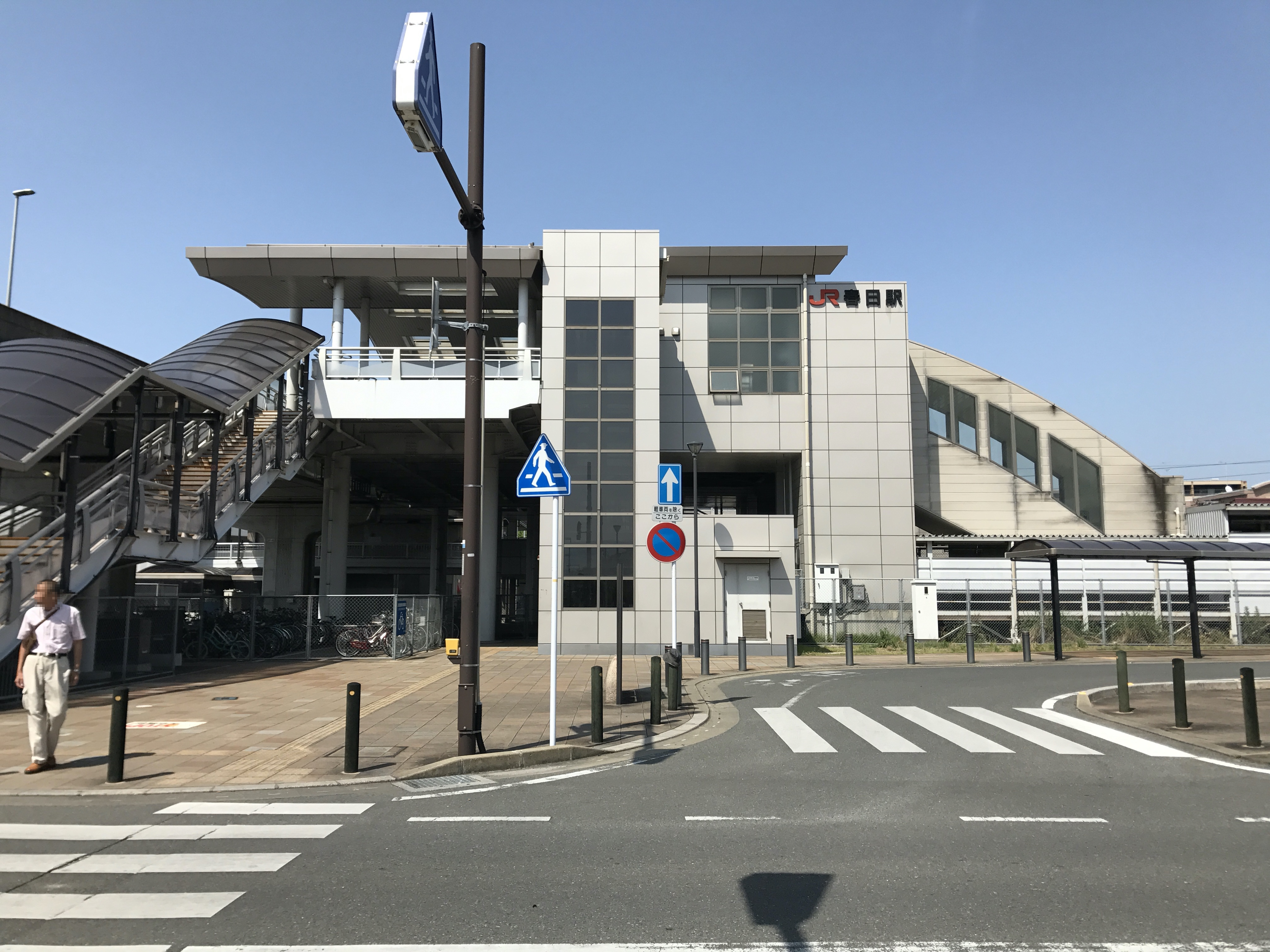
- Kasuga Station 2017

General information
- Location: 3 Chome Haramachi, Kasuga-shi, Fukuoka-ken 816-0804; Japan
- Coordinates: 33°32′08″N 130°28′07″E
- Operator: JR Kyushu
- Line: JB Kagoshima Main Line
- Distance: 86.1 km from Mojikō
- Platforms: 2 side platforms
- Tracks: 2

Construction
- Structure type: At grade

Other information
- Status: Staffed
- Website: Official website

History
- Opened: 11 March 1989

Passengers
- FY2020: 3676 daily
- Rank: 46th (among JR Kyushu stations)

Services
Preceding station	JR Kyushu	Following station
Ōnojō towards Kagoshima	Kagoshima Main Line	Minami-Fukuoka towards Mojikō
Location
- Location within Fukuoka Prefecture Location within Japan

Kasuga Station (春日駅, Kasuga-eki) is a passenger railway station located in the city of Kasuga, Fukuoka Prefecture, Japan. It is operated by JR Kyushu.

== Lines ==
The station is served by the Kagoshima Main Line and is located 86.1 km from the starting point of the line at Mojikō.

== Layout ==
The station consists of two opposed ground-level side platforms connected by an elevated station building. The station is staffed.

=== Platforms ===
1	■ JB Kagoshima Main Line	for Futsukaichi and Tosu
2	■ JB Kagoshima Main Line	for Hakata and Kokura

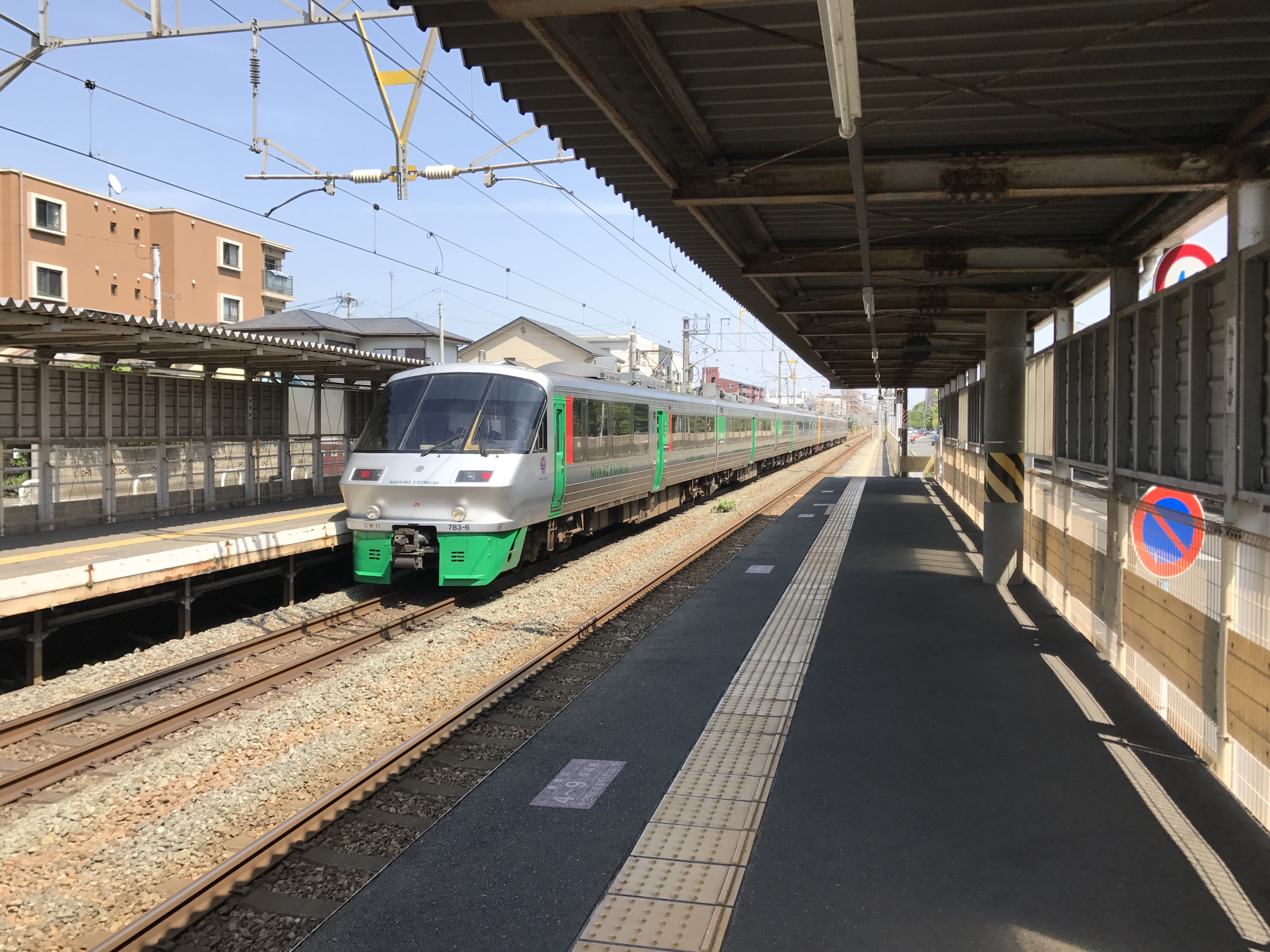
Platforms（2017）

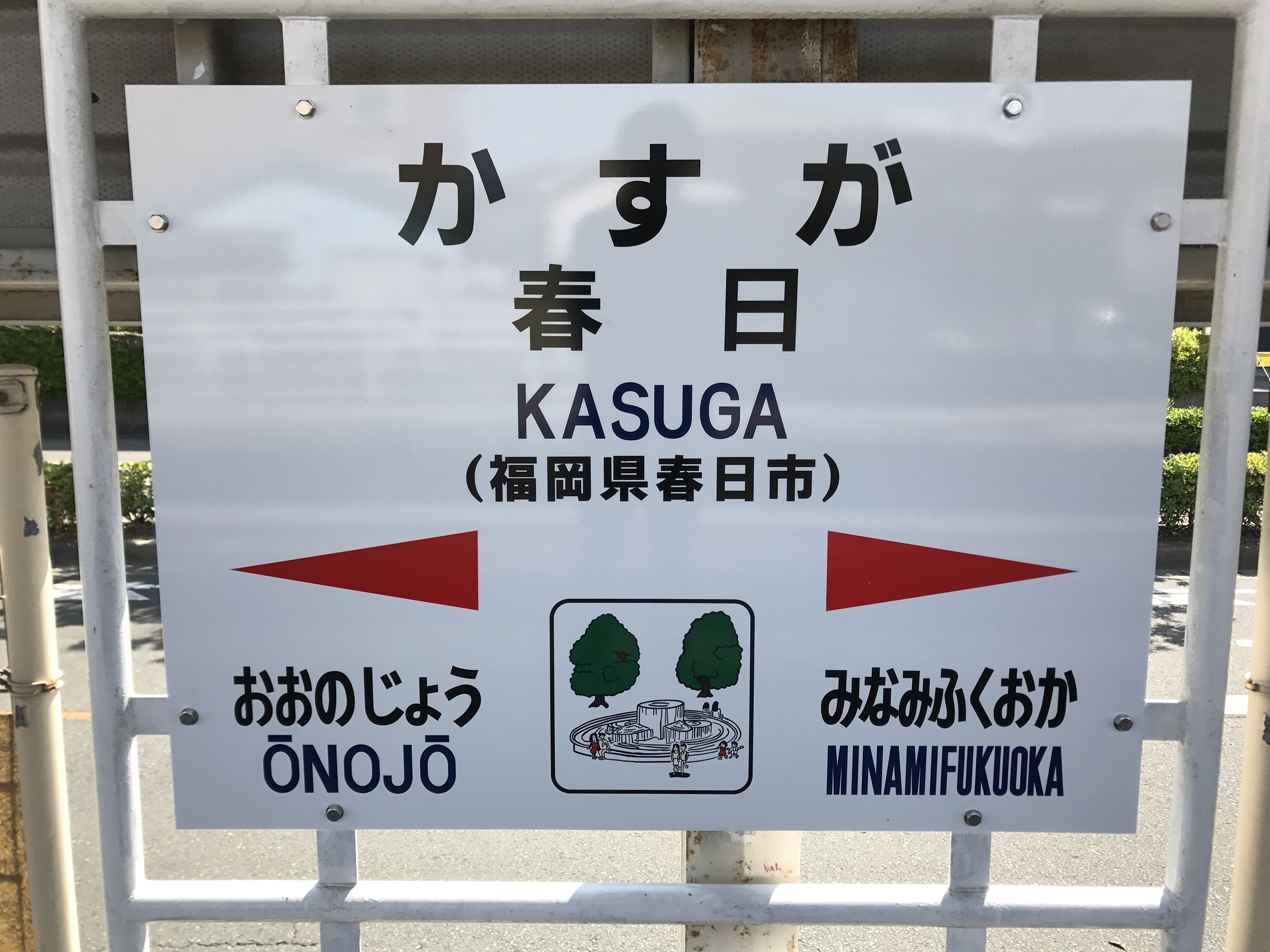
Station sign

== History ==
The station was opened by JR Kyushu on 11 March 1989 as an added station on the existing Kagoshima Main Line track.

== Passenger statistics ==
In fiscal 2020, the station was used by an average of 3676 passengers daily (boarding passengers only), and it ranked 46th among the busiest stations of JR Kyushu.

== Surrounding area ==
It is located in the northeastern part of Kasuga City. The distance from the station to Kasuga City Hall is about 250 meters, and there are many residential buildings around the station, as well as public facilities.

== See also ==
- List of railway stations in Japan
