= Senchō Station =

Railway station in Yatsushiro, Kumamoto Prefecture, Japan

Senchō Station 千丁駅
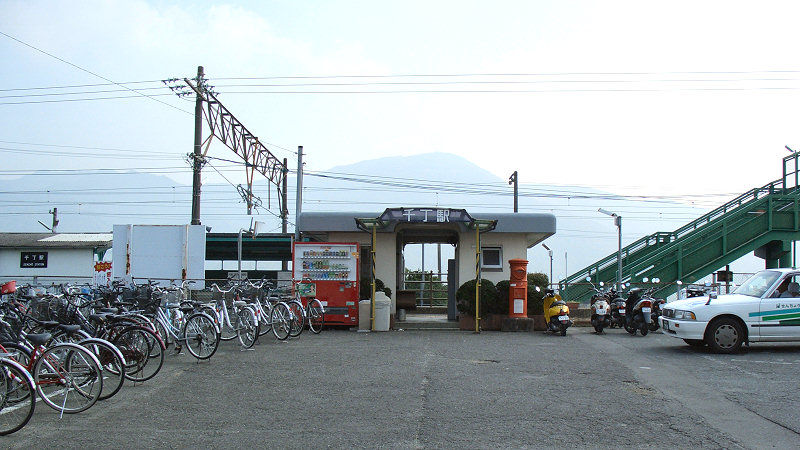
- Senchō Station in October 2006

General information
- Location: Kitsuōumaru, Senchō, Yatsushiro-shi, Kumamoto-ken 869-4702; Japan
- Coordinates: 32°31′58″N 130°38′45″E
- Operator: JR Kyushu
- Line: ■ Kagoshima Main Line
- Platforms: 2 side platforms
- Tracks: 2

Construction
- Structure type: At grade

Other information
- Website: Official website

History
- Opened: 1 June 1926

Passengers
- FY2014: 502 daily

Services
| Preceding station | JR Kyushu | Following station |
|---|---|---|
| Shin-Yatsushiro towards Kagoshima | Kagoshima Main Line | Arisa towards Mojikō |
Location
- Location within Kumamoto Prefecture Location within Japan

Senchō Station (千丁駅, Senchō-eki) is a passenger railway station located in the city of Yatsushiro, Kumamoto Prefecture, Japan. It is operated by JR Kyushu.

== Lines ==
The station is served by the Kagoshima Main Line and is located 227.6 km from the starting point of the line at Mojiko.

== Layout ==
The station consists of two opposed side platforms serving two tracks at grade, connected by a footbridge. The station building is unattended.

=== Platforms ===
| 1 | ■ ■ Kagoshima Main Line | for Kumamoto |
| 2 | ■ ■ Kagoshima Main Line | for Shin-Yatsushiro and Yatsushiro |

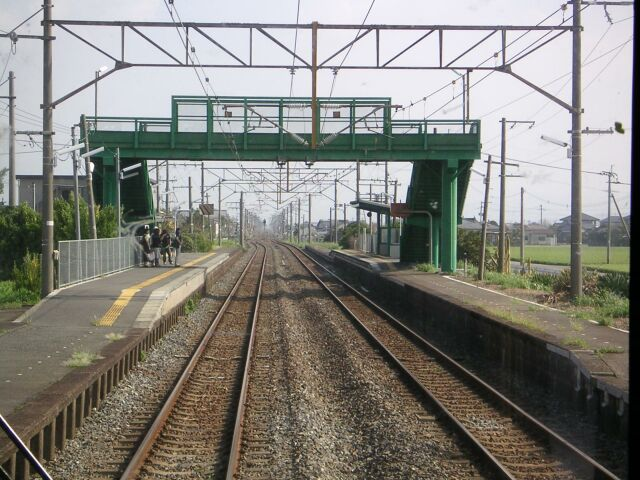
Tracks and footbridge

== History ==
Senchō Station was opened on 1 June 1926. After the privatization of the Japanese National Railways (JNR) on 1 April 1987, the station came under JR Kyushu.

== Passenger statistics ==
In fiscal 2014 the station was used by an average of 502 passengers daily (boarding passengers only).

== Surrounding area ==
- Yatsushiro City Hall Sencho Branch Office (formerly Sencho Town Hall)

== See also ==
- List of railway stations in Japan
