= Ogawa Station (Kumamoto) =

Railway station in Uki, Kumamoto Prefecture, Japan

Ogawa Station 小川駅
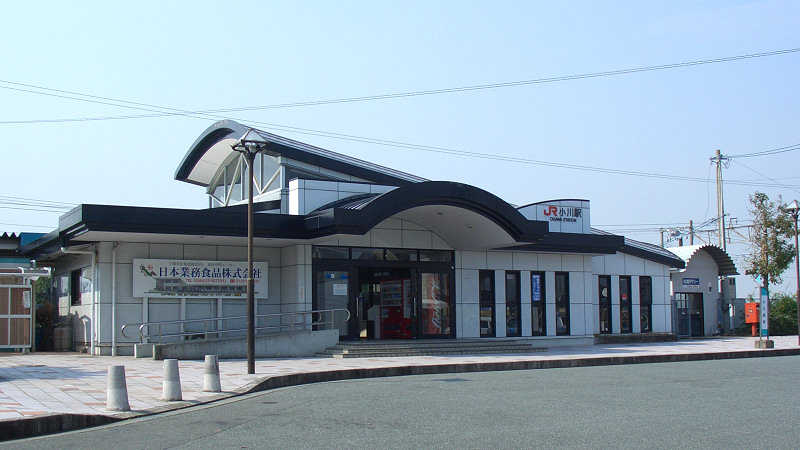
- Ogawa Station in October 2006

General information
- Location: 332-2, Ogawa-Chou Kawashiri, Uki-shi, Kumamoto-ken 869-0623; Japan
- Coordinates: 32°36′04″N 130°41′40″E
- Operator: JR Kyushu
- Line: ■ Kagoshima Main Line
- Platforms: 2 side platforms
- Tracks: 2

Construction
- Structure type: At grade

Other information
- Website: Official website

History
- Opened: 21 November 1896

Passengers
- FY2020: 949 daily
- Rank: 140th (among JR Kyushu stations)

Services
Preceding station	JR Kyushu	Following station
Arisa towards Kagoshima	Kagoshima Main Line	Matsubase towards Mojikō
Location
- Location within Kumamoto Prefecture Location within Japan

Ogawa Station (小川駅, Ogawa-eki) is a passenger railway station located in the city of Uki, Kumamoto Prefecture, Japan. It is operated by JR Kyushu.

== Lines ==
The station is served by the Kagoshima Main Line and is located 218.5 km from the starting point of the line at Mojiko.

== Layout ==
The station consists of two opposed side platforms serving two tracks at grade, connected by a footbridge. The station building, located on the east side of the tracks, is unattended.

=== Platforms ===
1	■ ■ Kagoshima Main Line	for Shin-Yatsushiro and Yatsushiro
2	■ ■ Kagoshima Main Line	for Kumamoto

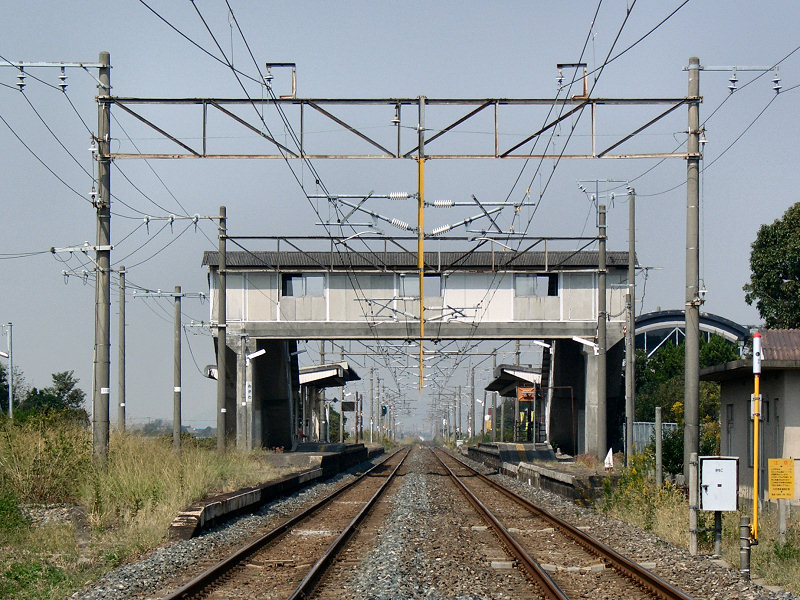
Tracks and footbridge

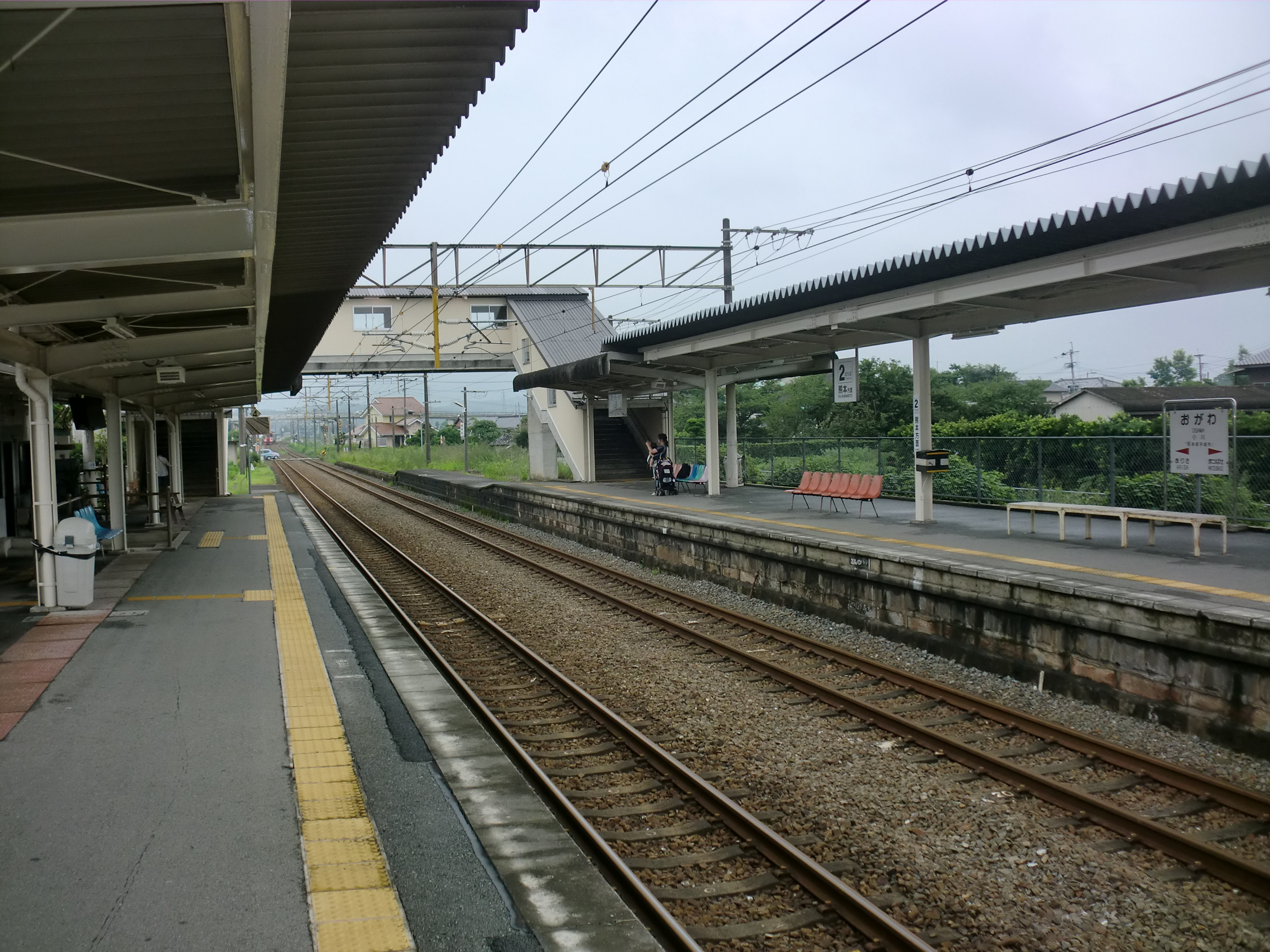
Platforms

== History ==
Ogawa Station was opened on 21 November 1896 as a station on the Kyushu Railway, which was nationalized in 1907. The first station building was destroyed in an air raid on 27 July 1945. After the privatization of the Japanese National Railways (JNR) on 1 April 1987, the station came under JR Kyushu.

== Passenger statistics ==
In the fiscal year ending March 31, 2025, the station was used by an average of 1,141 passengers daily (boarding passengers only), and it ranked the 151st busiest of JR Kyushu's stations.

== See also ==
- List of railway stations in Japan

== Surrounding area ==
- Uki City Hall Ogawa Branch (formerly Ogawa Town Hall)
- Kumamoto Prefectural Ogawa Technical High School
