= Hizen-Asahi Station =

Railway station in Tosu, Saga Prefecture, Japan

JB 16 Hizen-Asahi Station 肥前旭駅
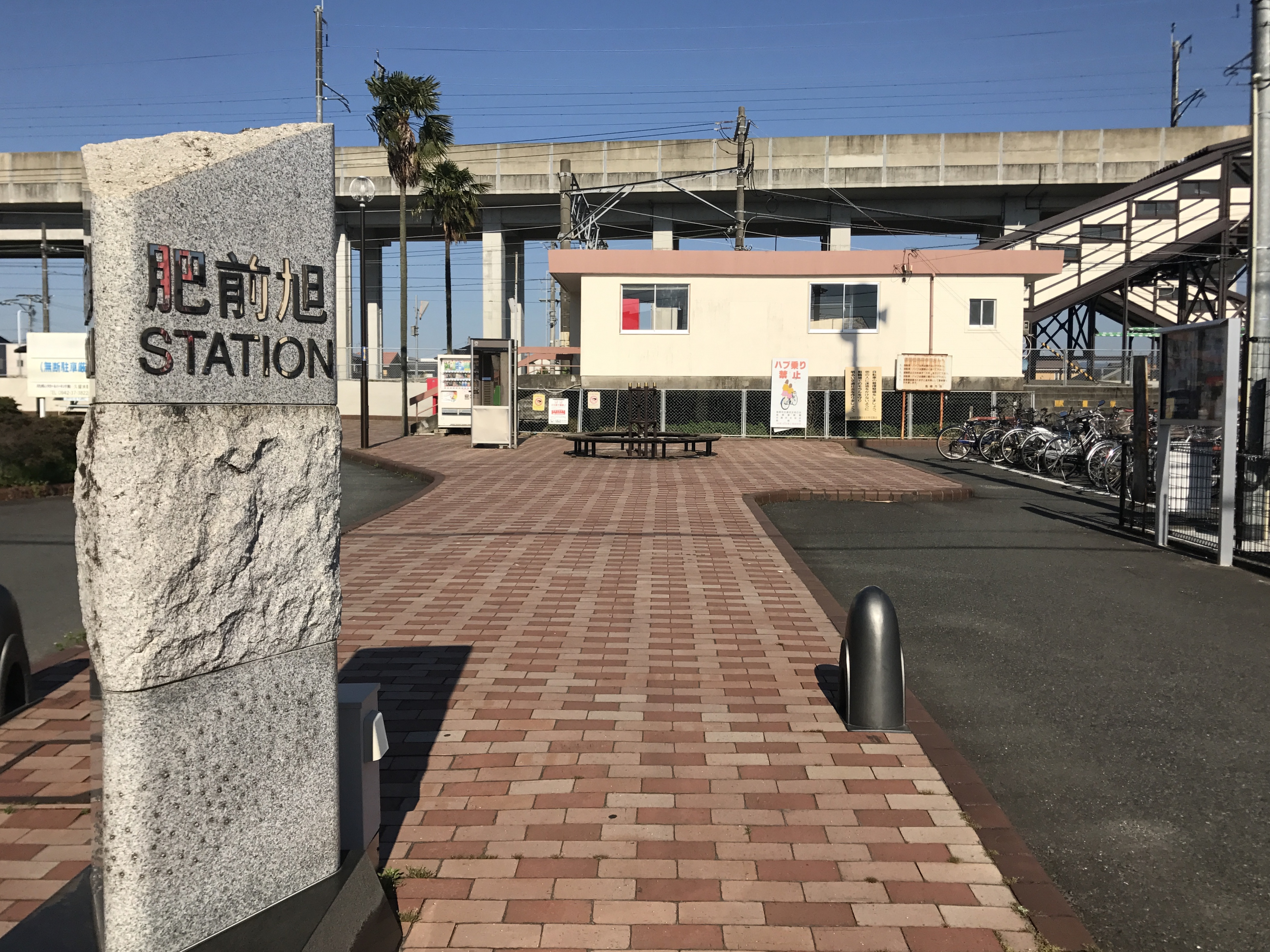
- Hizen-Asahi Station in 2017

General information
- Location: Gitokumachi, Tosu-shi, Saga-ken 841-0066; Japan
- Coordinates: 33°21′00″N 130°29′46″E
- Operator: JR Kyushu
- Line: JB Kagoshima Main Line
- Distance: 110.4 km from Mojikō
- Platforms: 2 side platforms
- Tracks: 2 + 2 sidings

Construction
- Structure type: At grade
- Cycle facilities: Designated parking area for bikes
- Accessible: No - platforms linked by footbridge

Other information
- Status: Unstaffed
- Website: Official website

History
- Opened: 23 December 1928
- Former names: Asahi Signal Box (until 7 June 1934)

Passengers
- FY2022: 683 daily
- Rank: 195th (among JR Kyushu stations)

Services
Preceding station	JR Kyushu	Following station
Kurume towards Kagoshima	Kagoshima Main Line	Tosu towards Mojikō
Location
- Location within Saga Prefecture Location within Japan

Hizen-Asahi Station (肥前旭駅, Hizen-Asahi-eki) is a passenger railway station located in the city of Tosu, Saga Prefecture, Japan. It is operated by JR Kyushu.

== Lines ==
The station is served by the Kagoshima Main Line and is located 110.4 km from the starting point of the line at Mojiko. Only local trains on the line stop at the station.

== Layout ==
The station consists of two opposed side platforms serving two tracks at grade. A siding branches off each of the two tracks near the station. The station building is a small concrete structure which is unstaffed and serves only to house a waiting area, an automatic ticket vending machine, a Sugoca charge machine and a Sugoca card reader. Access to the opposite side platform is by means of a footbridge.

=== Platforms ===
1	■ JB Kagoshima Main Line	for Kurume, Ōmuta
2	■ JB Kagoshima Main Line	for Kokura and Hakata

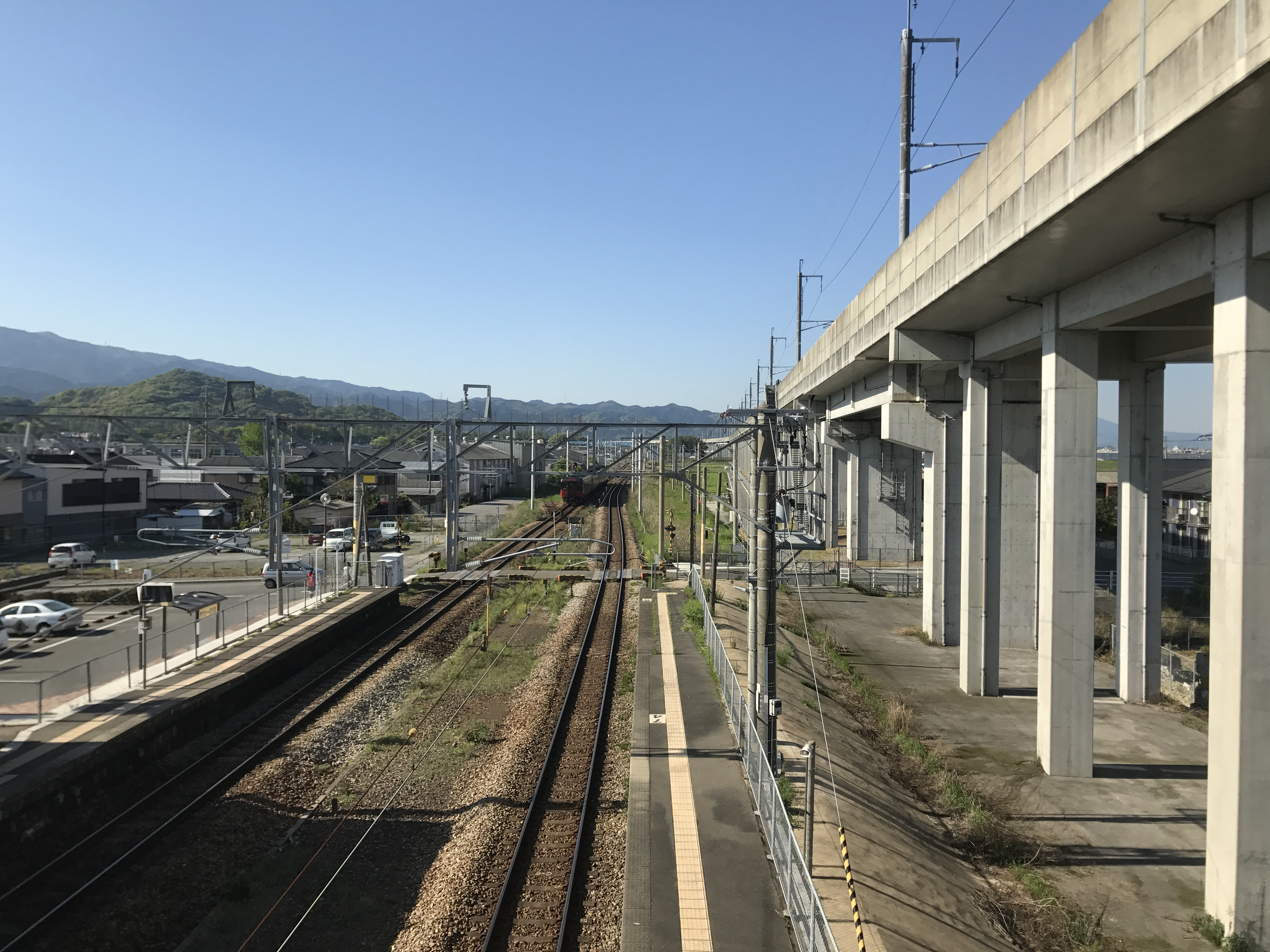
View of the platforms and tracks. A siding can be seen in the distance to the left.

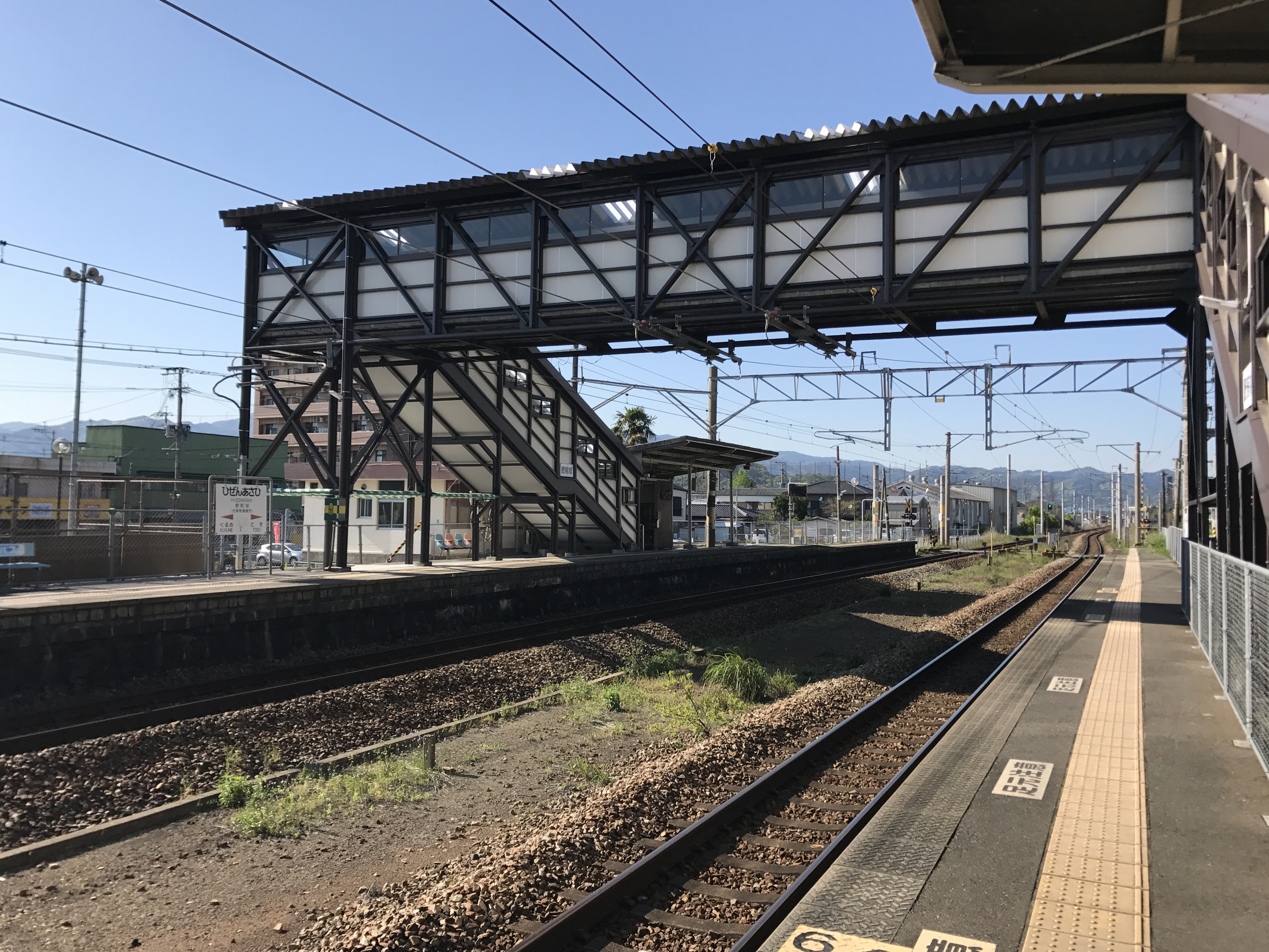
Close-up view of the footbridge.

== History ==
On 23 December 1928, Japanese Government Railways (JGR) opened the Asahi Signal Box at the present location of the station. On 7 June 1934, the facility was upgraded to a full station and renamed Hizen-Asahi. With the privatization of Japanese National Railways (JNR), the successor of JGR, on 1 April 1987, JR Kyushu took over control of the station.

== Passenger statistics ==
In fiscal 2020, the station was used by an average of 683 passengers daily (boarding passengers only), and it ranked 195th among the busiest stations of JR Kyushu.

== Surrounding area ==
The area around the station is far from national highways and major local roads, so there are no large-scale commercial facilities, and the area is filled with rice fields. However, as it is close to Fukuoka City and Kurume City, new housing has been built in recent years and it has become a commuter town.

== See also ==
- List of railway stations in Japan
