= Hakozaki Station =

Railway station in Fukuoka, Japan

JA 02 Hakozaki Station 箱崎駅
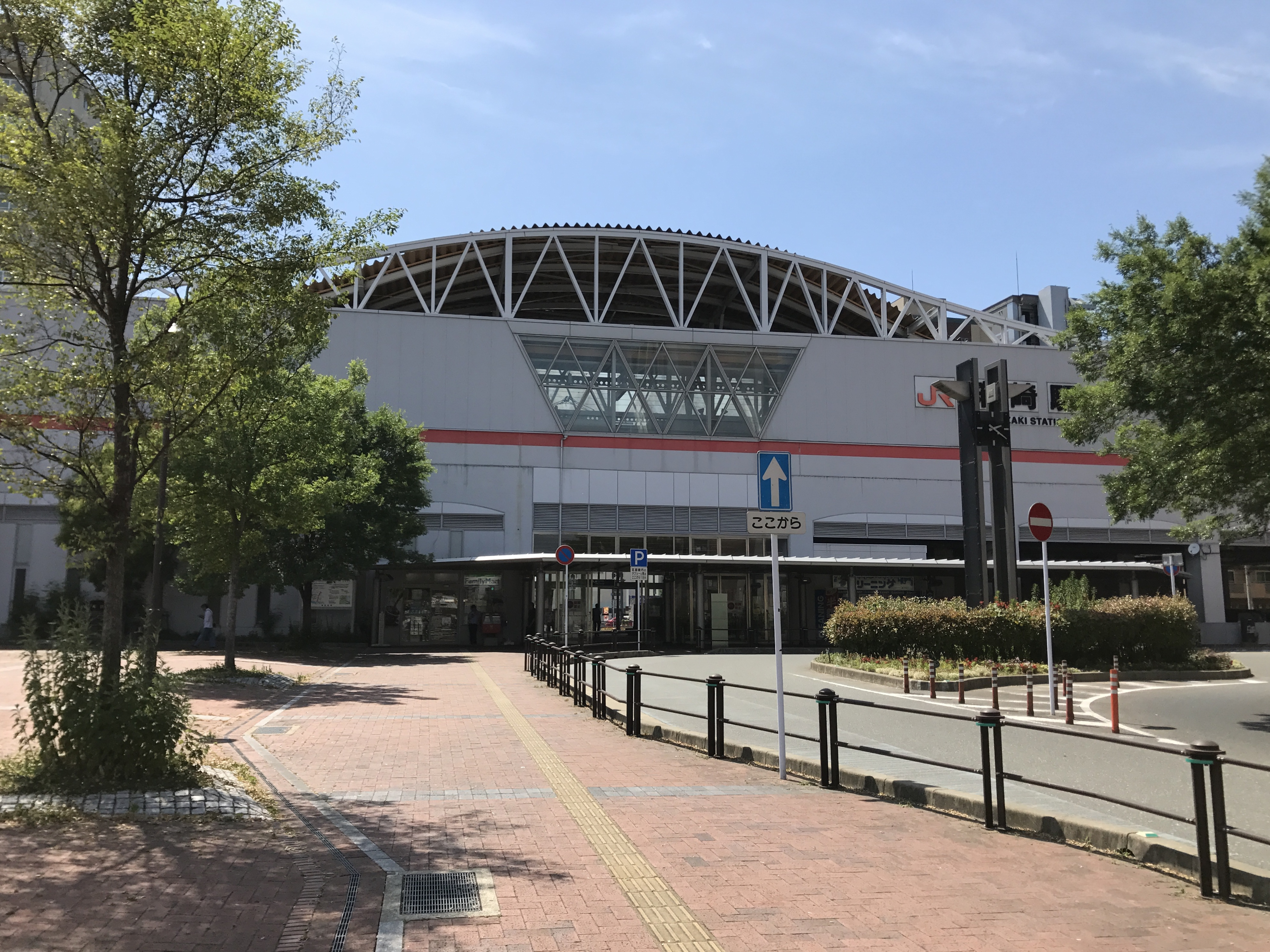
- Hakozaki Station in 2017

General information
- Location: 2 Chome-32 Hakomatsu, Higashi-ku, Fukuoka-shi, Fukuoka-ken 812-0061; Japan
- Coordinates: 33°37′04″N 130°25′36″E
- Operator: JR Kyushu
- Line: JA Kagoshima Main Line
- Distance: 75.0 km from Mojikō
- Platforms: 1 side + 1 island platforms
- Tracks: 3

Construction
- Structure type: Elevated

Other information
- Status: Staffed (Midori no Madoguchi)
- Website: Official website

History
- Opened: 28 September 1890

Passengers
- FY2020: 4927 daily
- Rank: 28th (among JR Kyushu stations)

Services
Preceding station	JR Kyushu	Following station
Yoshizuka towards Kagoshima	Kagoshima Main Line Local	Chihaya towards Mojikō
Location
- Location within Fukuoka Prefecture Location within Japan

Hakozaki Station (箱崎駅, Hakozaki-eki) is a passenger railway station located in Higashi-ku, Fukuoka, Kukuoka City, Fukuoka Prefecture, Japan. It is operated by JR Kyushu.

== Lines ==
The station is served by the Kagoshima Main Line and is located 75.0 km from the starting point of the line at Mojikō.

== Layout ==
The station consists of one side platform and one island platform serving three elevated tracks, connected by an elevated station building with a Midori no Madoguchi staffed ticket office.

=== Platforms ===
1	■ JA Kagoshima Main Line	for Kokura and Shimonoseki
2, 3	■ JA Kagoshima Main Line	for Hakata and Kurume

== History ==
The privately run Kyushu Railway had begun laying down its network on Kyushu in 1889 and by 1890 had a stretch of track from Hakata southwards to Kurume. The track was extended northwards from Hakata to Akama by 28 September 1890, with Hakozaki being opened on the same day as one of the intermediate stations. When the Kyushu Railway was nationalized on 1 July 1907, Japanese Government Railways (JGR) took over control of the station. On 12 October 1909, the station became part of the Hitoyoshi Main Line and then on 21 November 1909, part of the Kagoshima Main Line. With the privatization of Japanese National Railways (JNR), the successor of JGR, on 1 April 1987, JR Kyushu took over control of the station. From October 2001 to November 2003, construction work to build a new elevated station was undertaken. The new station was opened on 13 March 2004 and is about 400 metres north of the old location.

== Passenger statistics ==
In fiscal 2020, the station was used by an average of 4927 passengers daily (boarding passengers only), and it ranked 28th among the busiest stations of JR Kyushu.

== Surrounding area ==
The area around the station is an old urban area that developed around Kyushu University, and there are no large-scale commercial facilities.

- Hakozaki Shrine
- Fukuoka City Hakozaki Elementary School
- Fukuoka City Hakomatsu Elementary School
- Fukuoka City Higashi Ward Office

== See also ==
- List of railway stations in Japan
