= Kitakyūshū Freight Terminal =

Freight terminal in Kitakyushu, Japan

Coordinates: 33°53′47″N 130°55′23″E

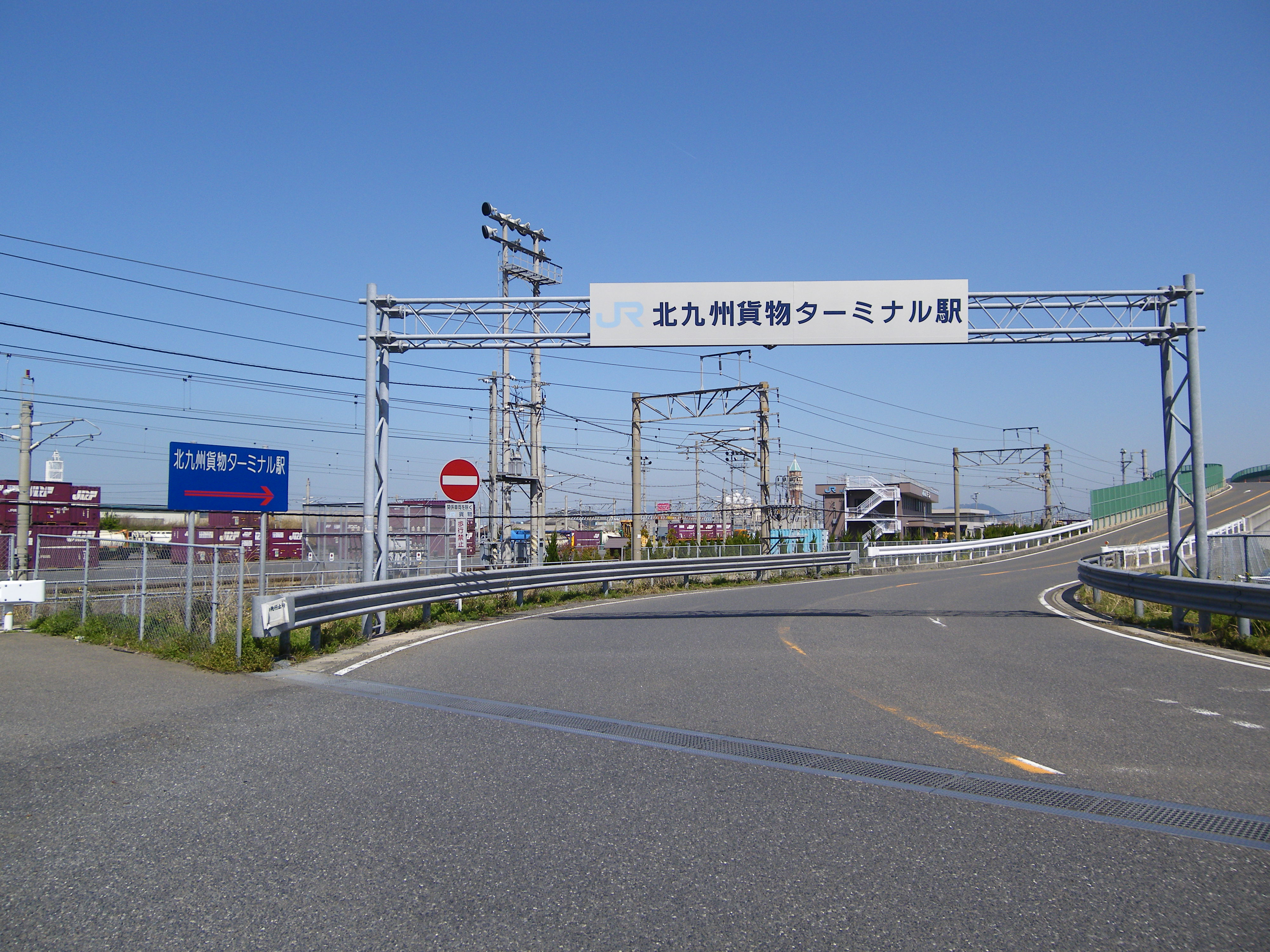
Main gate of Kitakyūshū Freight Terminal

Kitakyūshū Freight Terminal (北九州貨物ターミナル駅, Kitakyūshū Kamotsu-tāminaru-eki) is a freight terminal on the Kagoshima Main Line in Moji-ku, Kitakyūshū, Japan, operated by Japan Freight Railway Company (JR Freight).

The freight terminal opened on March 23, 2002.
