= Futsukaichi Station =

Railway station in Chikushino, Fukuoka Prefecture, Japan

JB 08 Futsukaichi Station 二日市駅
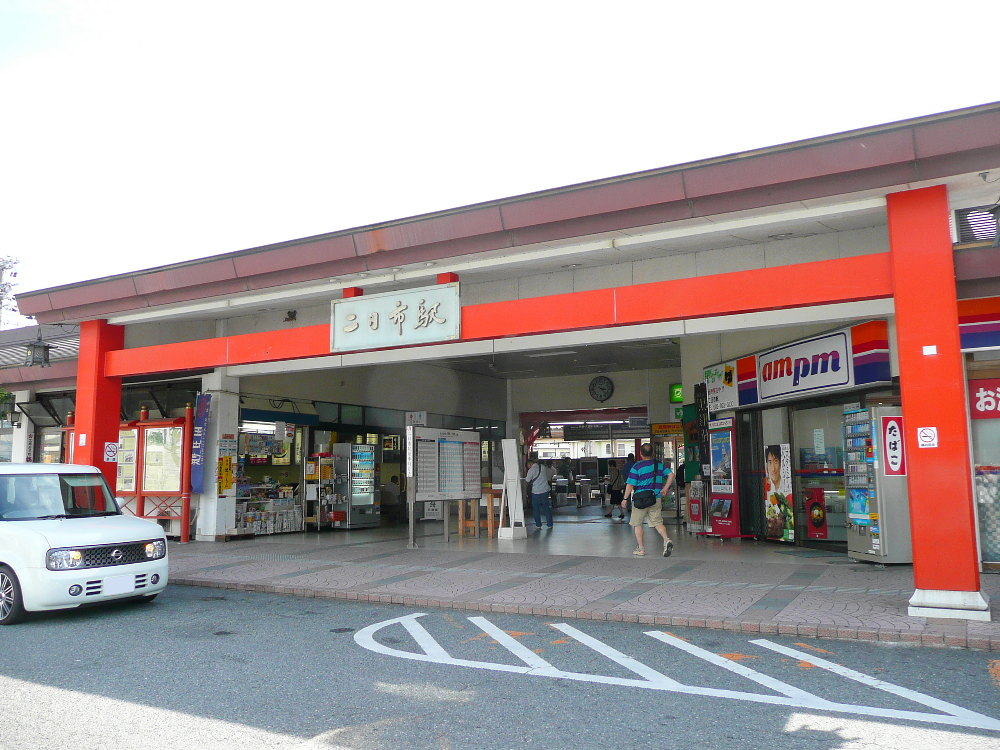
- Futsukaichi Station

General information
- Location: 1-chōme-1 Futsukaichichūō, Chikushino-shi, Fukuoka-ken 818-0072; Japan
- Coordinates: 33°29′42″N 130°31′07″E
- Operator: JR Kyushu
- Line: JB Kagoshima Main Line
- Distance: 92.4 km from Mojikō
- Platforms: 2 island platforms
- Tracks: 4 + 2 sidings

Construction
- Structure type: At grade

Other information
- Status: Staffed (Midori no Madoguchi)
- Website: Official website

History
- Opened: 11 December 1889

Passengers
- FY2020: 5320 daily
- Rank: 25th (among JR Kyushu stations)

Services
Preceding station	JR Kyushu	Following station
Tempaizan towards Kagoshima	Kagoshima Main Line	Tofurōminami towards Mojikō
Location
- Location within Fukuoka Prefecture Location within Japan

Futsukaichi Station (二日市駅, Futsukaichi-eki) is a passenger railway station located in the city of Chikushino, Fukuoka Prefecture, Japan. It is operated by JR Kyushu.

== Lines ==
The station is served by the Kagoshima Main Line and is located 92.4 km from the starting point of the line at Mojikō.

== Layout ==
The station consists of two island platforms serving four tracks, connected by a footbridge. Two sidings branch off the main tracks. The current station building is a one-story reinforced concrete building that was renovated in 1987, and was constructed in the image of Dazaifu Tenman-gu Shrine. The station has a Midori no Madoguchi staffed ticket office.

=== Platforms ===
1, 2	■ JB Kagoshima Main Line	for Kurume and Ōmuta
3, 4	■ JB Kagoshima Main Line	for Hakata and Kokura

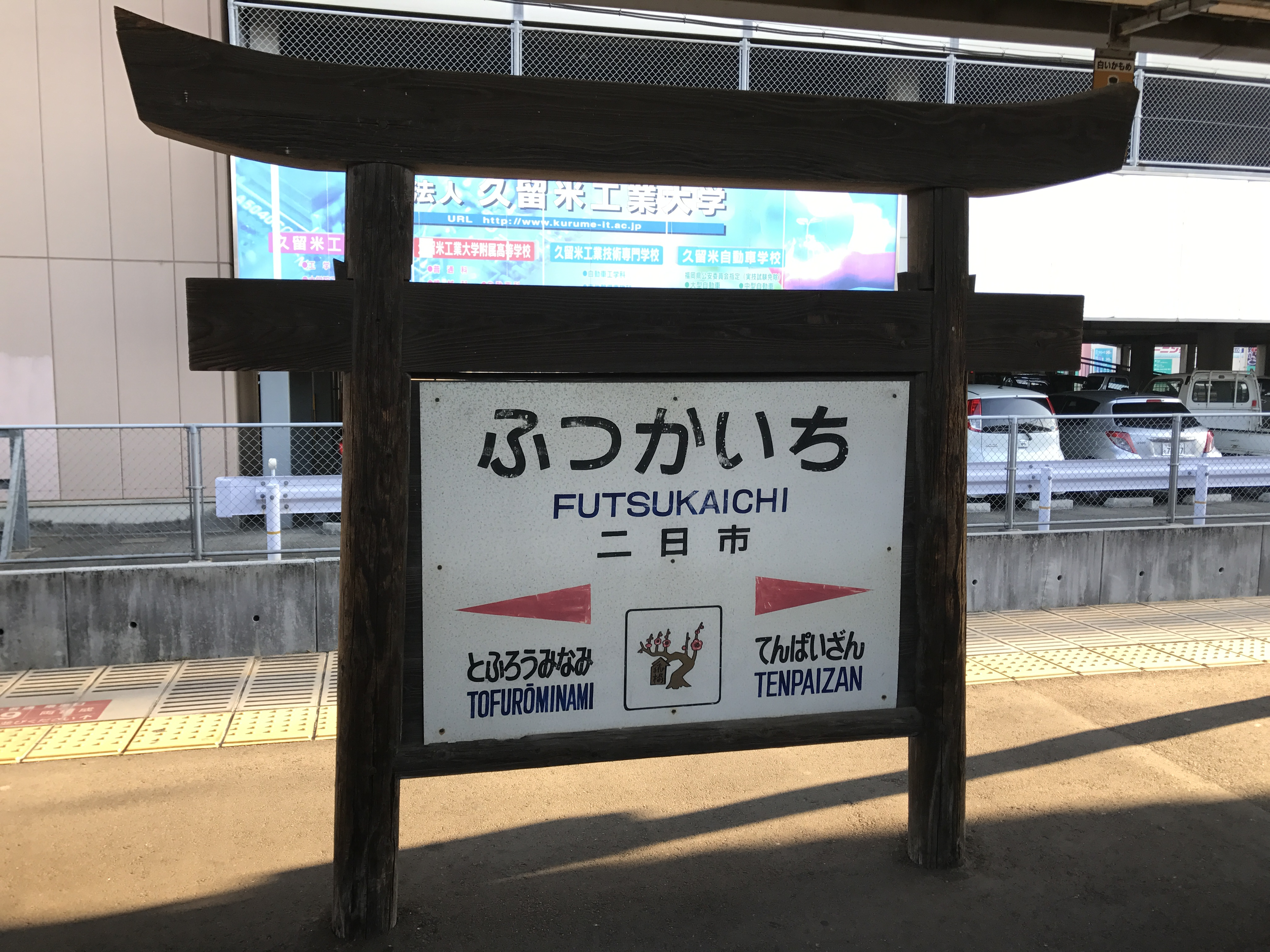
Station sign in torii shape with the illustration of “Tobi-ume”, Dazaifu Tenman-gū

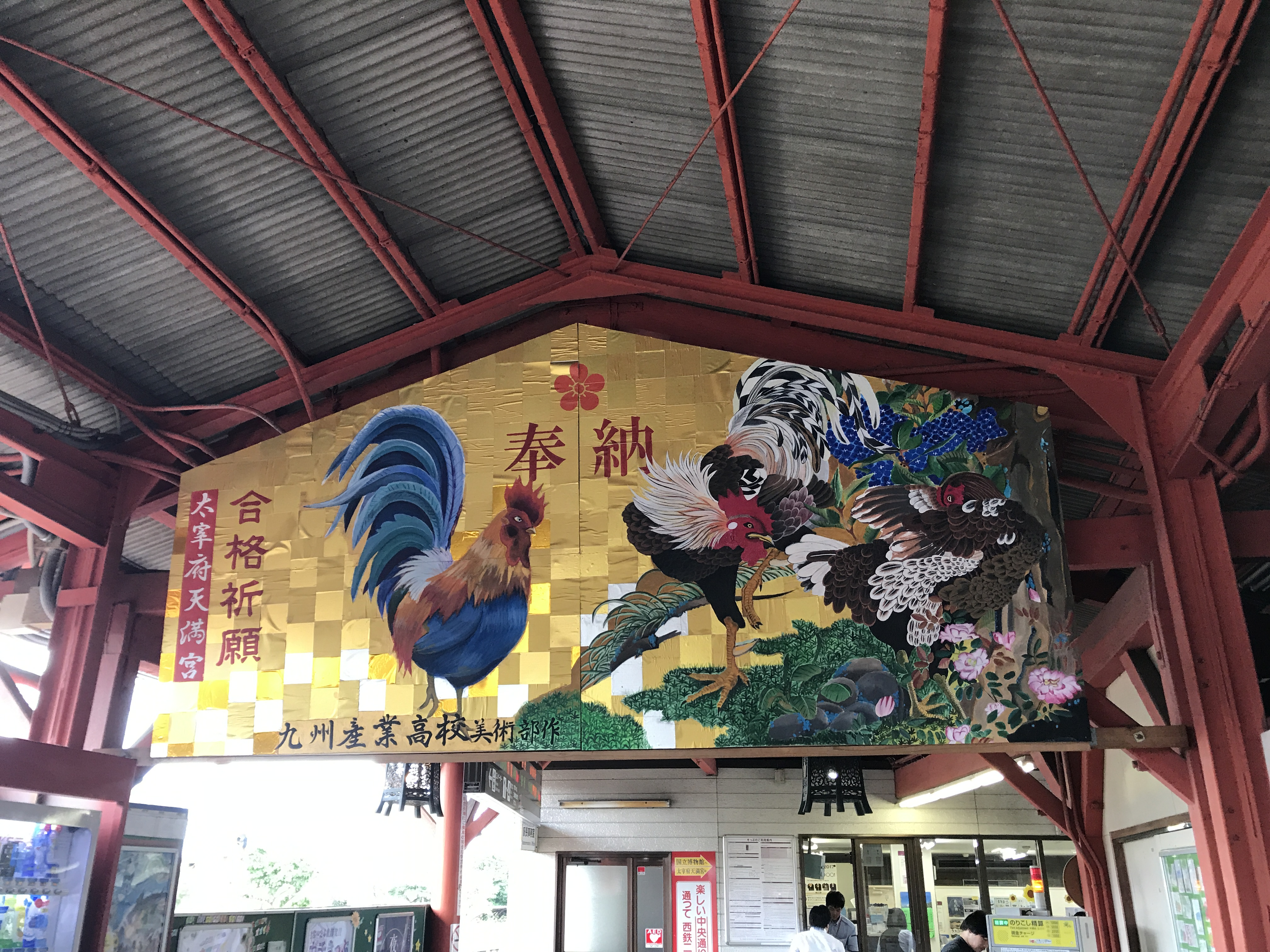
Decoration of huge ema

== History ==
The station was opened on 11 December 1889 by the privately run Kyushu Railway after the construction of a track between Hakata and the (now closed) Chitosegawa temporary stop with Tosu as one of several intermediate stations on the line. When the Kyushu Railway was nationalized on 1 July 1907, Japanese Government Railways (JGR) took over control of the station. On 12 October 1909, the station became part of the Hitoyoshi Main Line and then on 21 November 1909, part of the Kagoshima Main Line. With the privatization of Japanese National Railways (JNR), the successor of JGR, on 1 April 1987, JR Kyushu took over control of the station.

== Passenger statistics ==
In fiscal 2020, the station was used by an average of 5320 passengers daily (boarding passengers only), and it ranked 25th among the busiest stations of JR Kyushu.

== Surrounding area ==
- Chikushino City History Museum
- Kyushu Sangyo High School attached to Kyushu Sangyo University
- Chikushino City Futsukaichi Junior High School
- Chikushino City Futsukaichi Elementary School

== See also ==
- List of railway stations in Japan
