= Idemitsu Art Museum Station =

Railway station located in Kitakyushu, Fukuoka

Idemitsu Art Museum Station 出光美術館駅
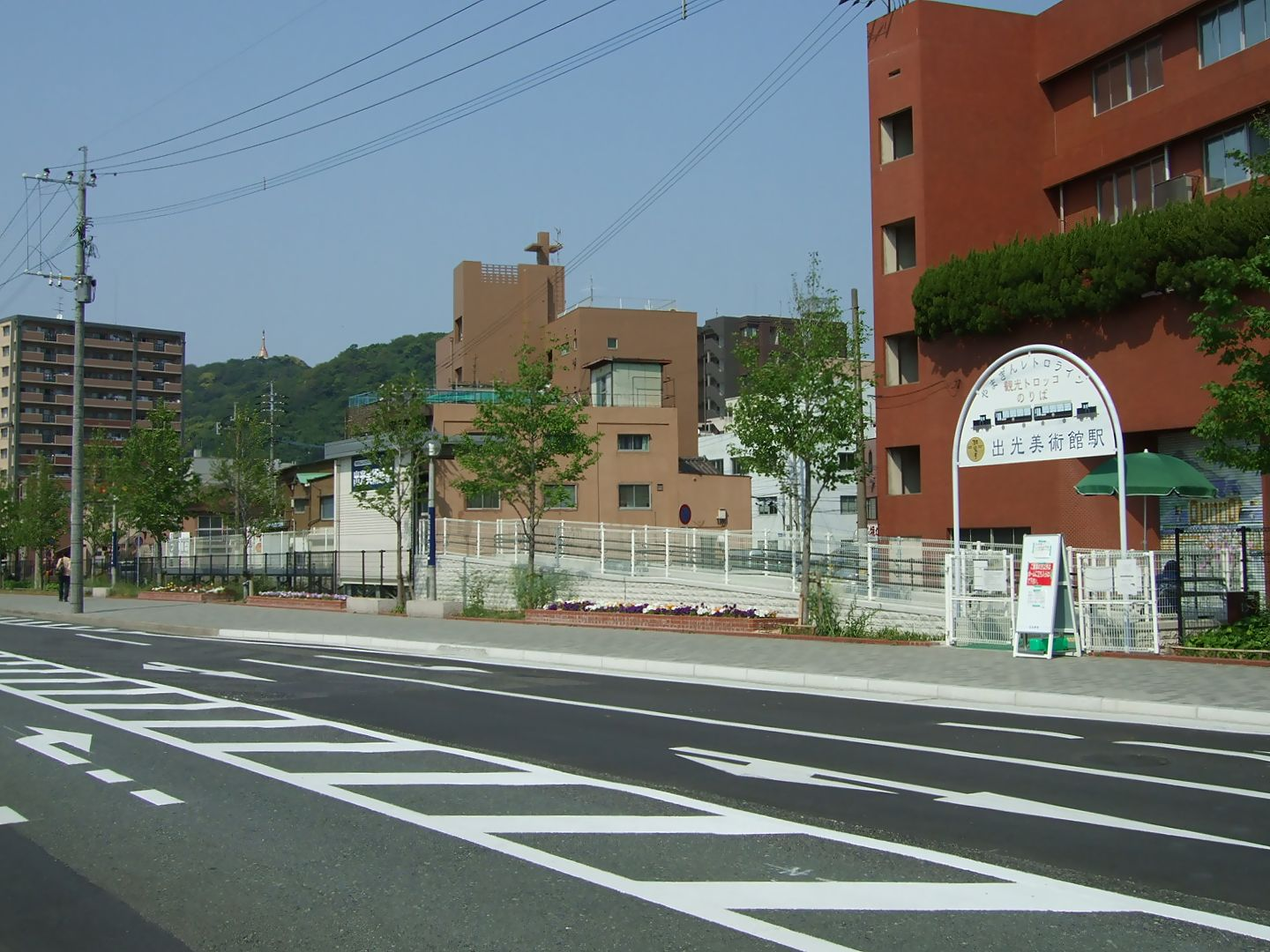
- Station entrance

General information
- Location: Kitakyushu, Fukuoka; Japan
- Coordinates: 33.9476°N 130.9652°E
- Operator: Heisei Chikuhō Railway
- Line: Mojikō Retro Scenic Line
- Distance: 0.5 from Kyushu Railway History Museum
- Platforms: 1 side platform

Construction
- Structure type: At-grade

History
- Opened: 26 April 2009

Services
Preceding station	Heisei Chikuhō Railway	Following station
Kyushu Railway History Museum Terminus	Mojikō Retro Scenic Line	Norfolk Hiroba towards Kanmonkaikyō Mekari
Location

Idemitsu Art Museum Station (出光美術館駅, Idemitsu-Bijutsukan-eki) is a train station in Moji ward of Kitakyushu, Fukuoka Prefecture, Japan. It is on the Mojikō Retro Scenic Line, a heritage railway operated by the Heisei Chikuhō Railway.

== Overview ==
Only a single four-car passenger train named the Shiokaze (潮風号) serves this station, operating between March and November. Except for certain weeks, trains only operate on the weekends and holidays. Eleven round-trip services are run per day at 40-minute intervals.
