= Fukkōdai-mae Station =

Railway station in Fukuoka, Japan

JA 06 Fukkōdai-mae Station 福工大前駅
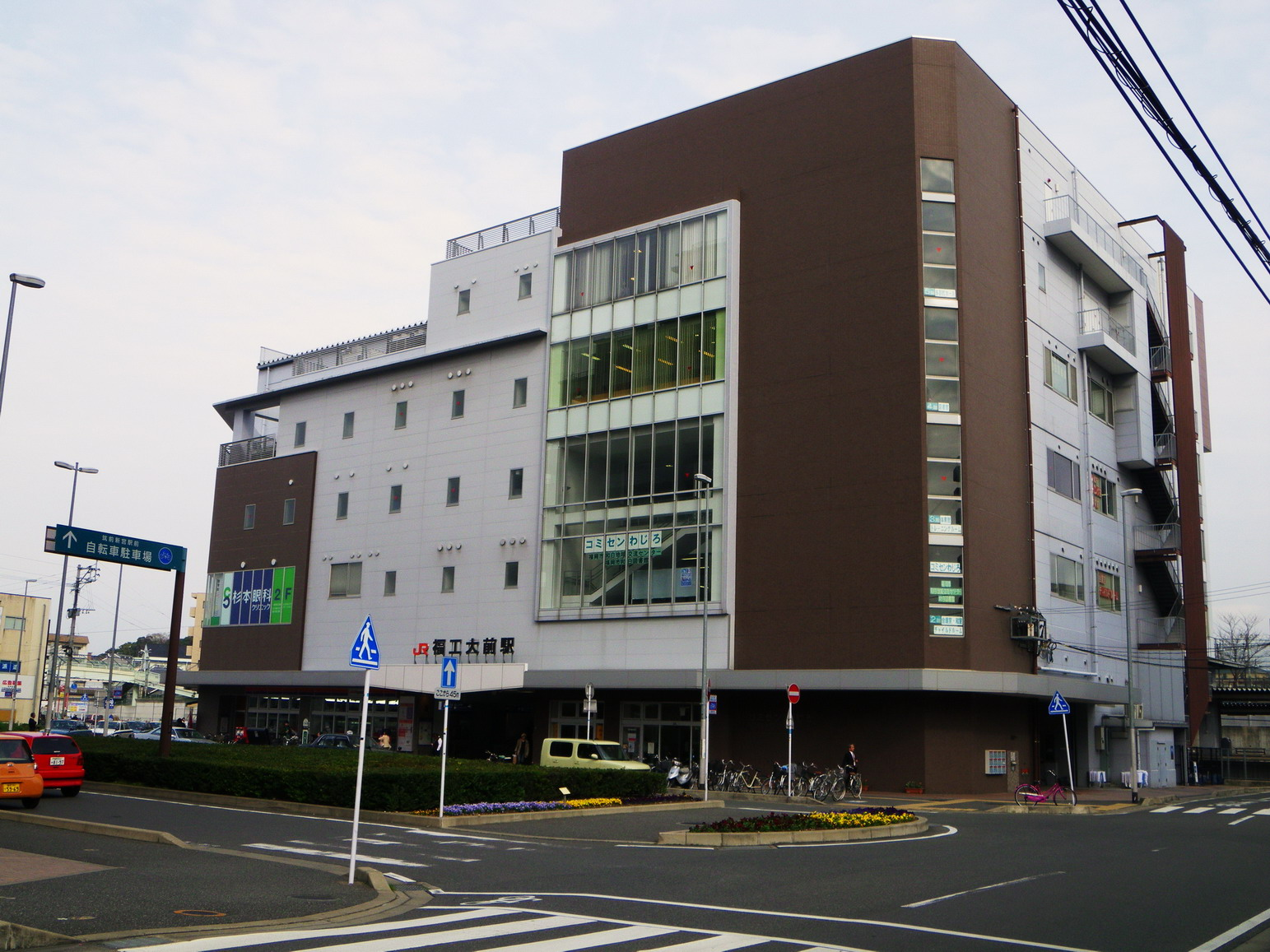
- Fukkōdai-mae Station in 2010

General information
- Location: 1-chōme-22 Wajirogaoka, Higashi-ku, Fukuoka-shi, Fukuoka-ken, 811-021; Japan
- Coordinates: 33°41′56″N 130°26′27″E
- Operator: JR Kyushu
- Line: JA Kagoshima Main Line
- Distance: 65.1 km from Mojikō
- Platforms: 2 island platforms
- Tracks: 4

Construction
- Structure type: Elevated

Other information
- Website: Official website

History
- Opened: 1 June 1915
- Former names: Chikuzen Shingũ (to 2008)

Passengers
- FY2020: 8,273
- Rank: 12th

Services
Preceding station	JR Kyushu	Following station
Kyusandaimae towards Kagoshima	Kagoshima Main Line	Shingū-Chūō towards Mojikō
Location
- Location within Fukuoka Prefecture Location within Japan

Fukkōdai-mae Station Station (福工大前駅, Fukkōdaimae-eki) is a passenger railway station located in Higashi-ku, Fukuoka Prefecture, Japan.

== Lines ==
The station is served by the Kagoshima Main Line and is located 65.1 km from the starting point of the line at Mojikō.

== Layout ==
The station consists of two island platforms serving four tracks, connected by an elevated station building. The station has a Midori no Madoguchi staffed ticket office. There are two entrances, the north exit where the station building is located, and the Fukuko Oguchi exit, which are connected by a free passage; however, Fukuko Oguchi is a passageway for people affiliated with the Fukuoka Institute of Technology, and is prohibited to anyone other than those affiliated with it (as this passageway is located within the school grounds).

=== Platforms ===
1	■ JA Kagoshima Main Line	for Orio and Kokura
2	■ JA Kagoshima Main Line	for Kurume, Tosu and Hakata

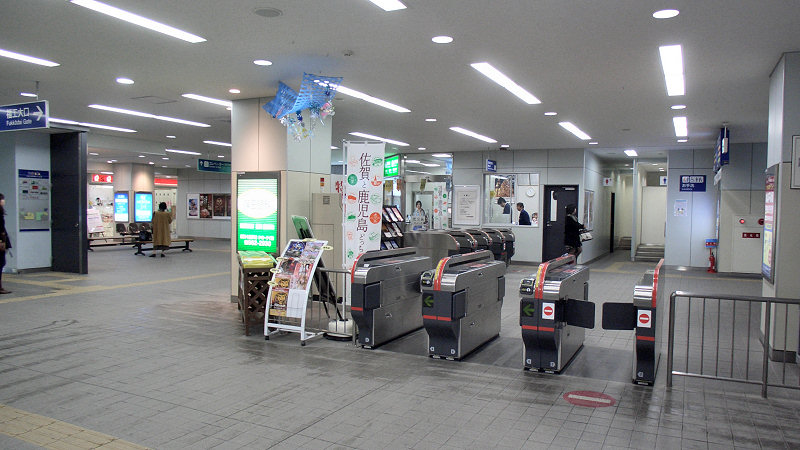
Concourse

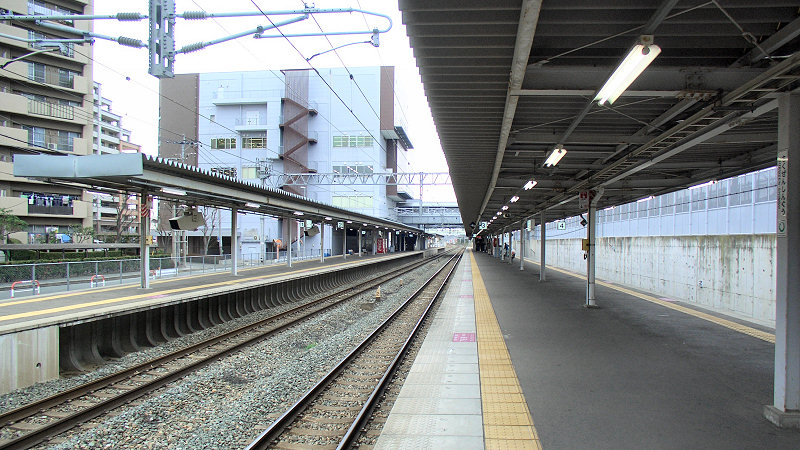
Platforms

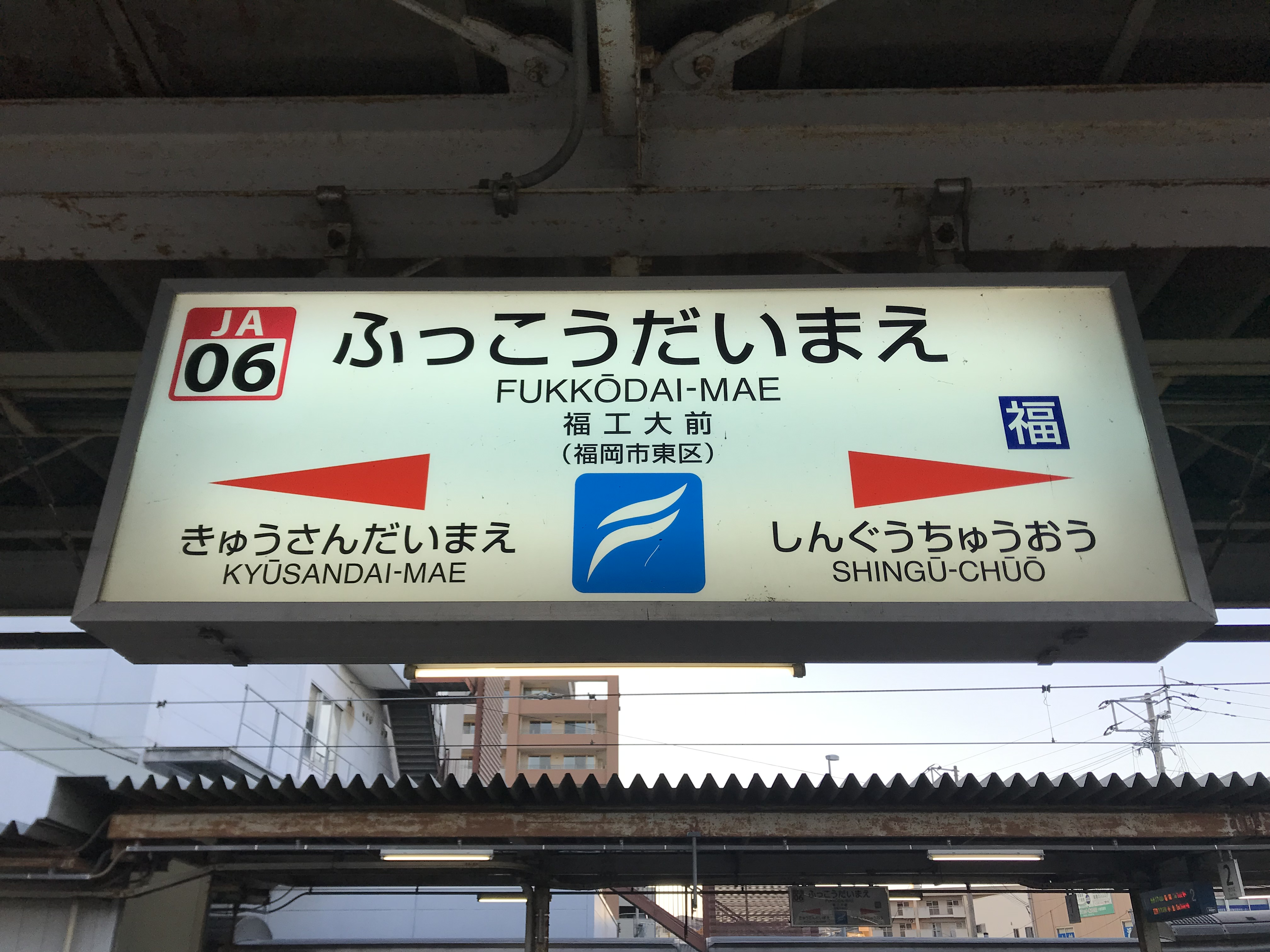
Station sign

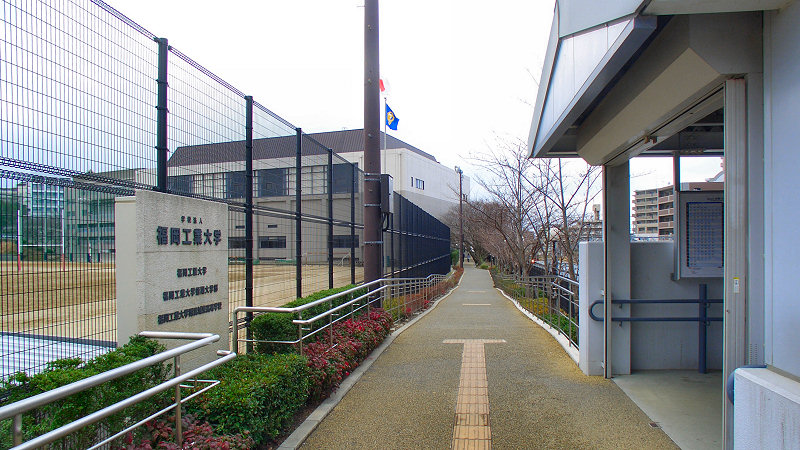
Fukuko Oguchi exit

== History ==
Japanese Government Railways (JGR) opened Shingū Signal Box (新官(信号所), Shingū shingosho) on 1 June 1915. On 1 October 1920 it was upgraded to a passenger station and its name was changed to Chikuzen Shingũ Station (筑前新官駅) and its location was shifted 100 metres further to the south on the line. Previously, the station building and platform spanned Higashi Ward in Fukuoka and Shingu Town, but after reconstruction in 1987, both the station building and the platform are entirely within Higashi Ward. With the privatization of Japanese National Railways (JNR), the successor of JGR, on 1 April 1987, JR Kyushu took over control of the station. The station was renamed Fukkōdai-mae on 15 March 2008. The name means, literally, "in front of the Fukuoka Institute of Technology".

== Passenger statistics ==
In fiscal 2020, the station was used by an average of 8,273 passengers daily (boarding passengers only), and it ranked 12th among the busiest stations of JR Kyushu.

== Surrounding area ==
- Fukuoka Institute of Technology
- Fukuoka Institute of Technology Joto High School
- Shingu town center

== See also ==
- List of railway stations in Japan
