= Kyūsandai-mae Station =

Railway station in Fukuoka, Japan

JA 05 Kyūsandai-mae Station 九産大前駅
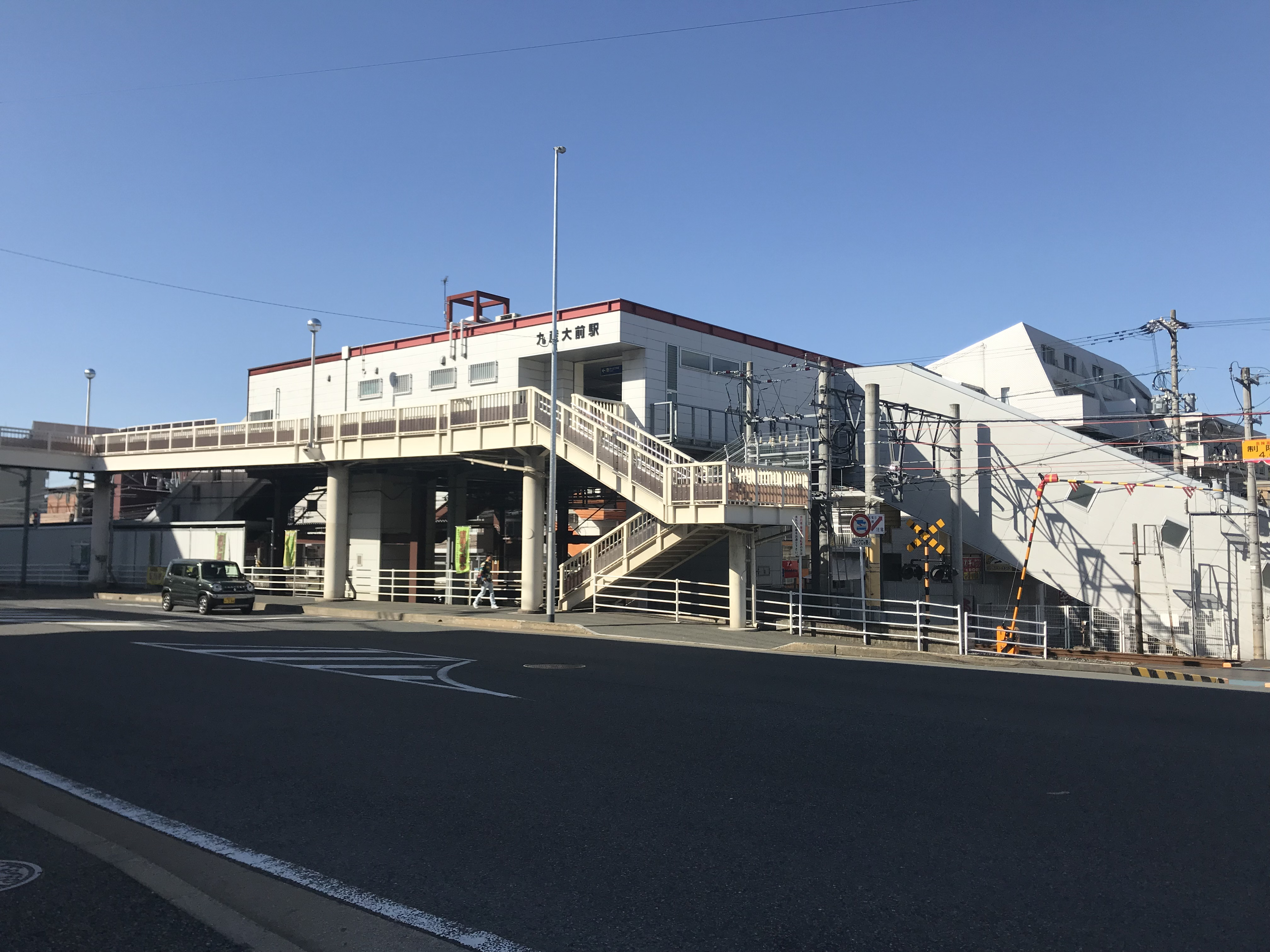
- Kyūsandai-mae Station in 2018

General information
- Location: 5-chōme-1 Tōnoharu, Higashi-ku, Fukuoka-shi, Fukuoka-ken, 813-0001; Japan
- Coordinates: 33°40′26″N 130°26′28″E
- Operator: JR Kyushu
- Line: JA Kagoshima Main Line
- Distance: 68.1 km from Mojikō
- Platforms: 2 side platforms
- Tracks: 2

Construction
- Structure type: At grade

Other information
- Status: Staffed (Midori no Madoguchi )
- Website: Official website

History
- Opened: 11 March 1989

Passengers
- FY2020: 4,832
- Rank: 30th

Services
Preceding station	JR Kyushu	Following station
Kashii towards Kagoshima	Kagoshima Main Line	Fukkōdaimae towards Mojikō
Location
- Location within Fukuoka Prefecture Location within Japan

Kyūsandai-mae Station (九産大前駅, Kyūsandaimae-eki) is a passenger railway station located in Higashi-ku, Fukuoka City, Fukuoka Prefecture, Japan. It is the nearest station of Kyushu Sangyo University. The station name means, literally, "in front of Kyushu Sangyo University".

== Lines ==
The station is served by the Kagoshima Main Line and is located 68.1 km from the starting point of the line at Mojikō.

== Layout ==
The station consists of two opposed side platforms serving two tracks, connected by an elevated station building. The station has a Midori no Madoguchi staffed ticket office.

=== Platforms ===
1	■ JA Kagoshima Main Line	for Orio and Kokura
2	■ JA Kagoshima Main Line	for Kurume, Tosu and Hakata

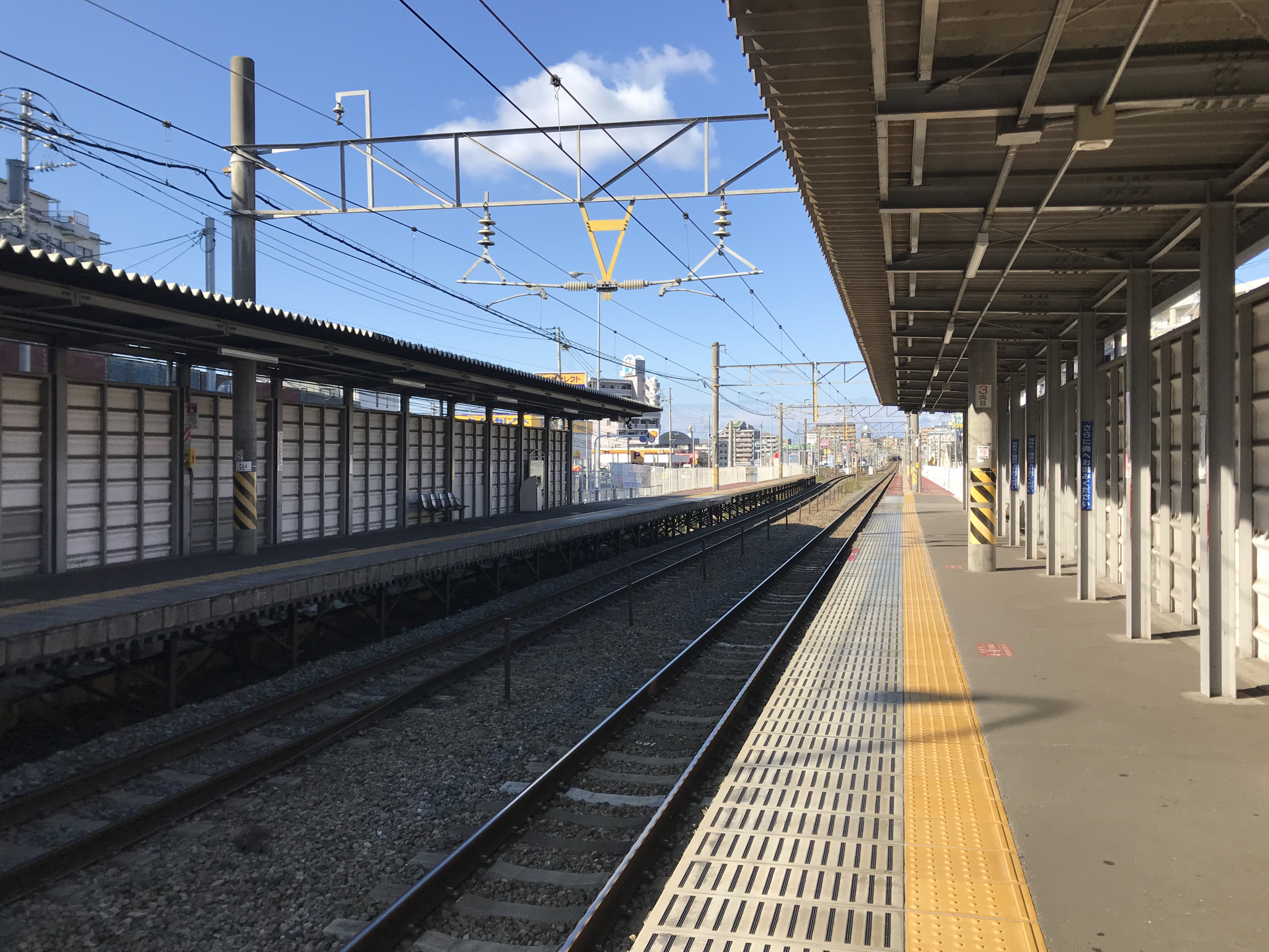
Platform

== History ==
The station was opened by JR Kyushu on 11 March 1989 as an added station on the existing Kagoshima Main Line track.

== Passenger statistics ==
In fiscal 2020, the station was used by an average of 4,832 passengers daily (boarding passengers only), and it ranked 30th among the busiest stations of JR Kyushu.

== Surrounding area ==
- Kyushu Sangyo University
- Fukuoka Prefectural Kasumioka High School
- Japan National Route 495
- Fukuoka City Kasumioka Elementary School

== See also ==
- List of railway stations in Japan
