= Kanmonkaikyō Mekari Station =

Railway station located in Kitakyushu, Fukuoka

Kanmonkaikyō Mekari Station 関門海峡めかり駅
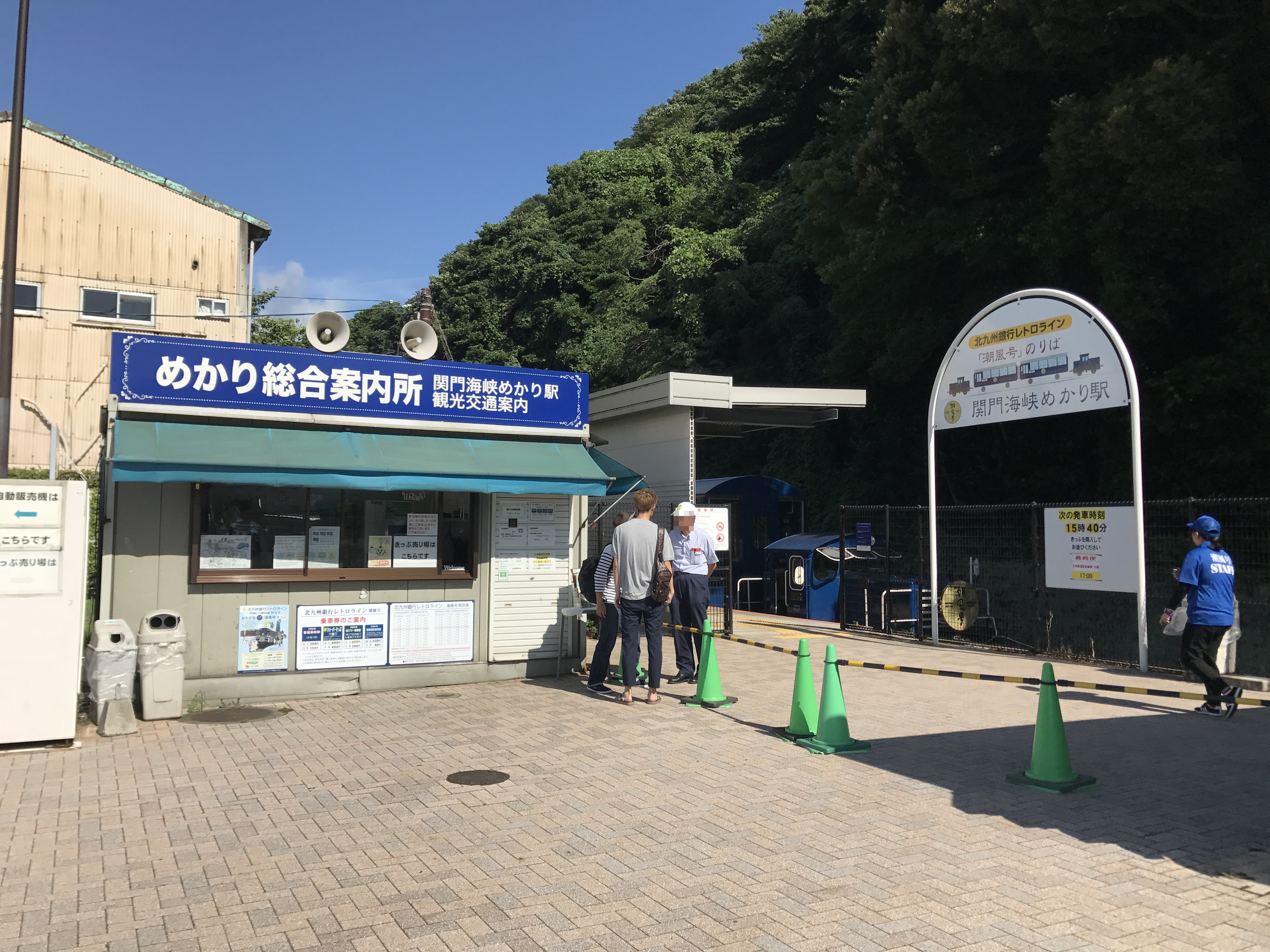
- Station entrance

General information
- Location: Kitakyushu, Fukuoka; Japan
- Coordinates: 33.9607°N 130.9676°E
- Operator: Heisei Chikuhō Railway
- Line: Mojikō Retro Scenic Line
- Distance: 2.1 from Kyushu Railway History Museum
- Platforms: 1 side platform

Construction
- Structure type: At-grade

History
- Opened: 26 April 2009

Services
Preceding station	Heisei Chikuhō Railway	Following station
Norfolk Hiroba towards Kyushu Railway History Museum	Mojikō Retro Scenic Line	Terminus
Location

Kanmonkaikyō Mekari Station (関門海峡めかり駅, Kanmonkaikyō-Mekari-eki) is a train station in Moji ward of Kitakyushu, Fukuoka Prefecture, Japan. It is on the Mojikō Retro Scenic Line, a heritage railway operated by the Heisei Chikuhō Railway. It is the northernmost train station in Kyushu.

The station name is derived from its position next to the Kanmon Straits and that it's within Mekari Park (和布刈公園).

== Overview ==
Only a single four-car passenger train named the Shiokaze (潮風号) serves this station, operating between March and November. Except for certain weeks, trains only operate on the weekends and holidays. Eleven round-trip services are run per day at 40-minute intervals.
