= Shiokaze =

Shiokaze may refer to:

- Shiokaze (train), a train service in Japan
- Shiokaze (broadcast), a Japanese shortwave radio broadcast aimed at North Korea
- Japanese destroyer Shiokaze, a Minekaze-class destroyer of the Imperial Japanese Navy
- Shiokaze, the name of the train on the Mojikō Retro Scenic Line
