= Kyushu Railway History Museum =

Railway museum in Kitakyushu, Japan

- 九州鉄道記念館
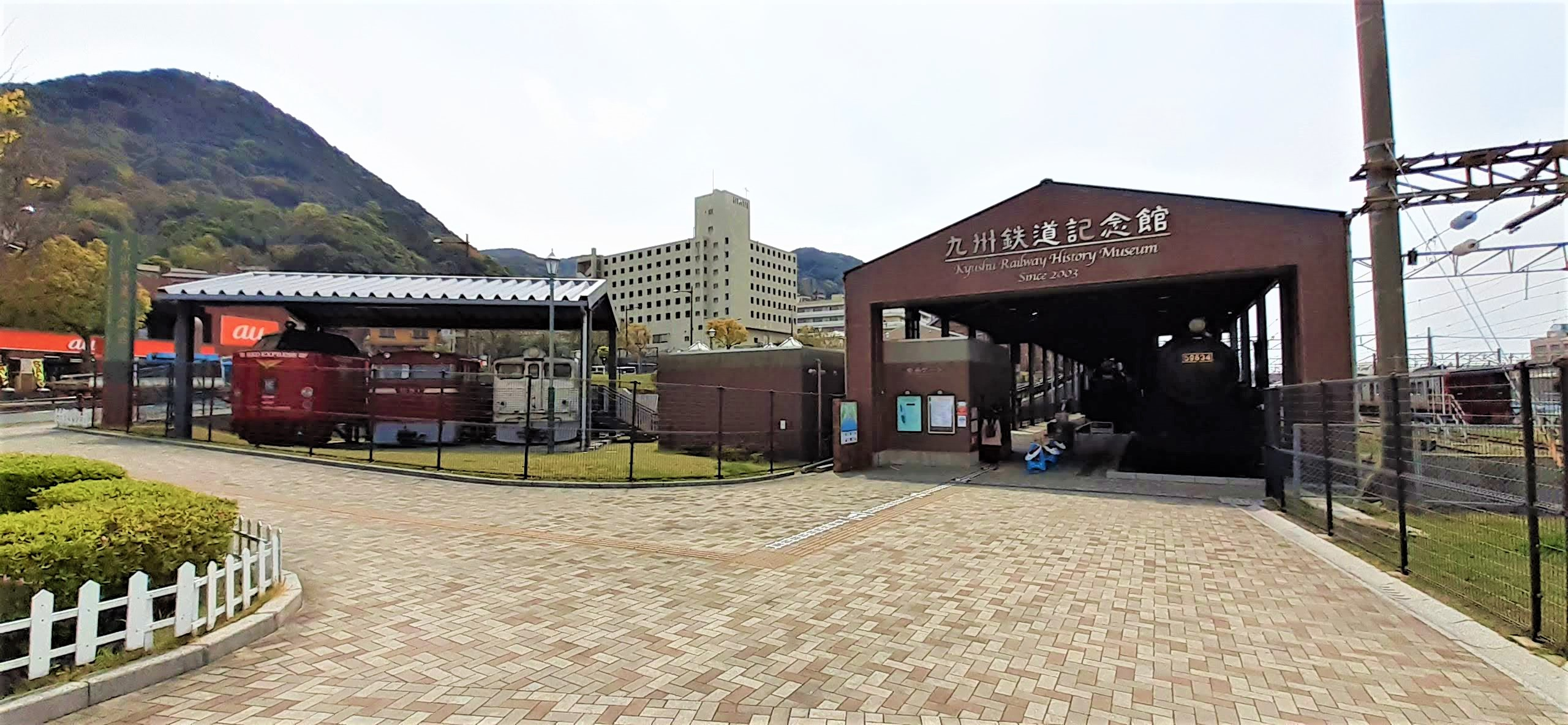
- The museum's entrance

- Location of the museum Kyushu Railway History Museum (Japan)
- Established: 9 August 2003
- Location: Kitakyushu, Japan
- Coordinates: 33.94317°N 130.96179°E
- Type: Railway museum
- Director: Masaaki Sato (佐藤正昭)
- Public transit access: Mojikō Station
- Website: www.k-rhm.jp

The Kyushu Railway History Museum is a railway museum owned by JR Kyushu in Kitakyushu, Japan.

== History ==
The museum's main building was the former head office of Kyushu Railway which was constructed doing 1891. In 2003 the Kyushu Railway Company opened the museum with many trains from all around Kyushu. In 2014 the main building was inscribed as a Tangible Cultural Property of Japan.

== Exhibits ==
The museum consists of three areas: the main building, the vehicle exhibition hall and a mini railway park. It is much smaller than other Japanese railway museums like the SCMaglev and Railway Park in Nagoya or the Kyoto Railway Museum.
