= Kyushu Railway History Museum Station =

Railway station located in Kitakyushu, Fukuoka

Kyushu Railway History Museum Station 九州鉄道記念館駅
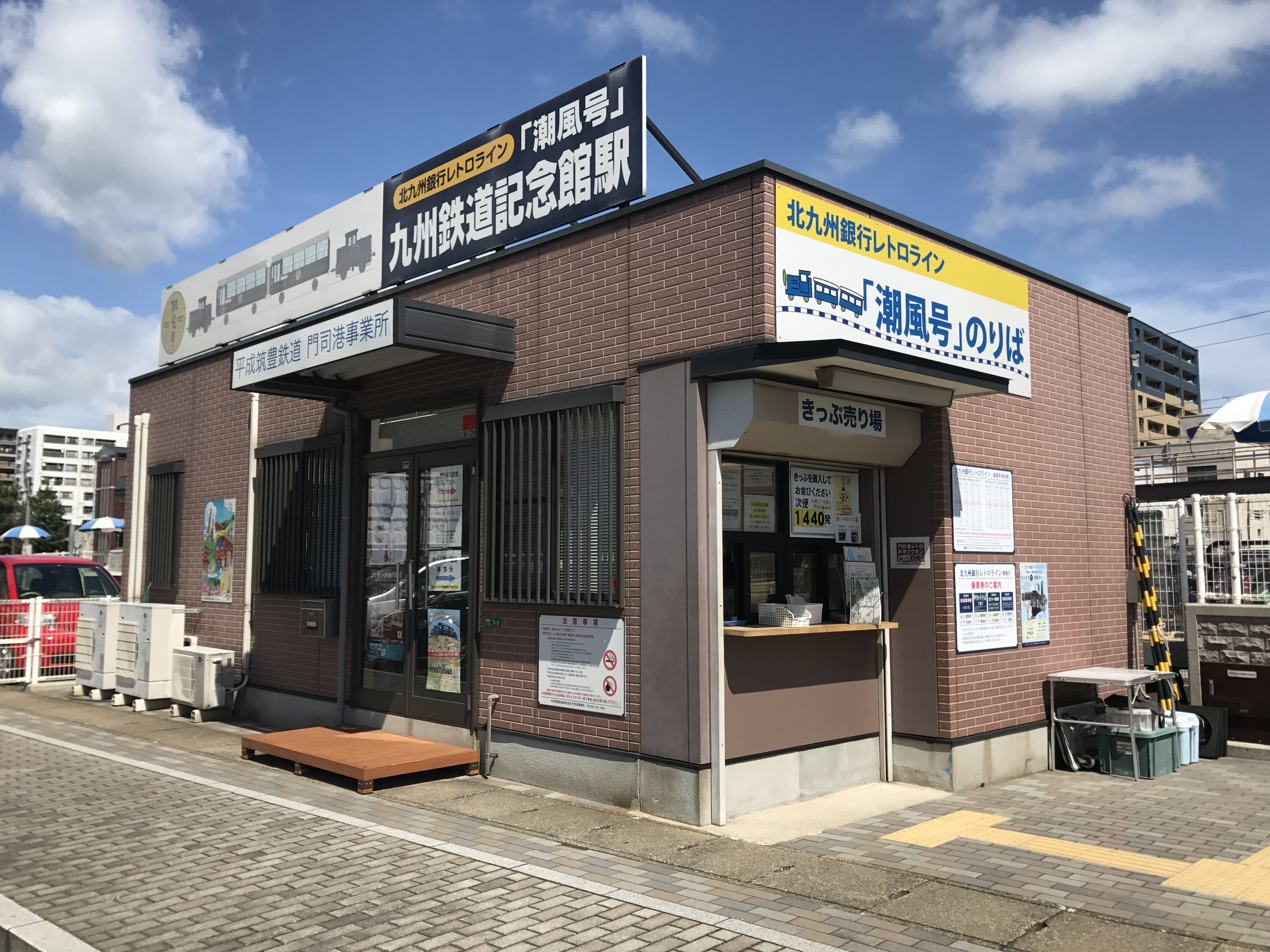
- Station entrance

General information
- Location: Kitakyushu, Fukuoka; Japan
- Coordinates: 33.9445°N 130.9625°E
- Operator: Heisei Chikuhō Railway
- Line: Mojikō Retro Scenic Line
- Distance: 0.0
- Platforms: 1 side platform
- Connections: JR Kyushu: Mojikō Station

Construction
- Structure type: At-grade

History
- Opened: 26 April 2009

Services
| Preceding station | Heisei Chikuhō Railway | Following station |
|---|---|---|
| Terminus | Mojikō Retro Scenic Line | Idemitsu Art Museum towards Kanmonkaikyō Mekari |
Location

Kyushu Railway History Museum Station (九州鉄道記念館駅, Kyūshū-Tetsudō-Kinenkan-eki) is a train station in Moji ward of Kitakyushu, Fukuoka Prefecture, Japan. It is on the Mojikō Retro Scenic Line, a heritage railway operated by the Heisei Chikuhō Railway.

== Overview ==
Only a single four-car passenger train named the Shiokaze (潮風号) serves this station, operating between March and November. Except for certain weeks, trains only operate on the weekends and holidays. Eleven round-trip services are run per day at 40-minute intervals.

Prior to the opening of the station, this station was tentatively named "Mojikō Station" due to its proximity to JR Kyushu's station of the same name. JR Kyushu acquired naming rights to the station and named it after the Kyushu Railway History Museum located nearby.

== Gallery ==
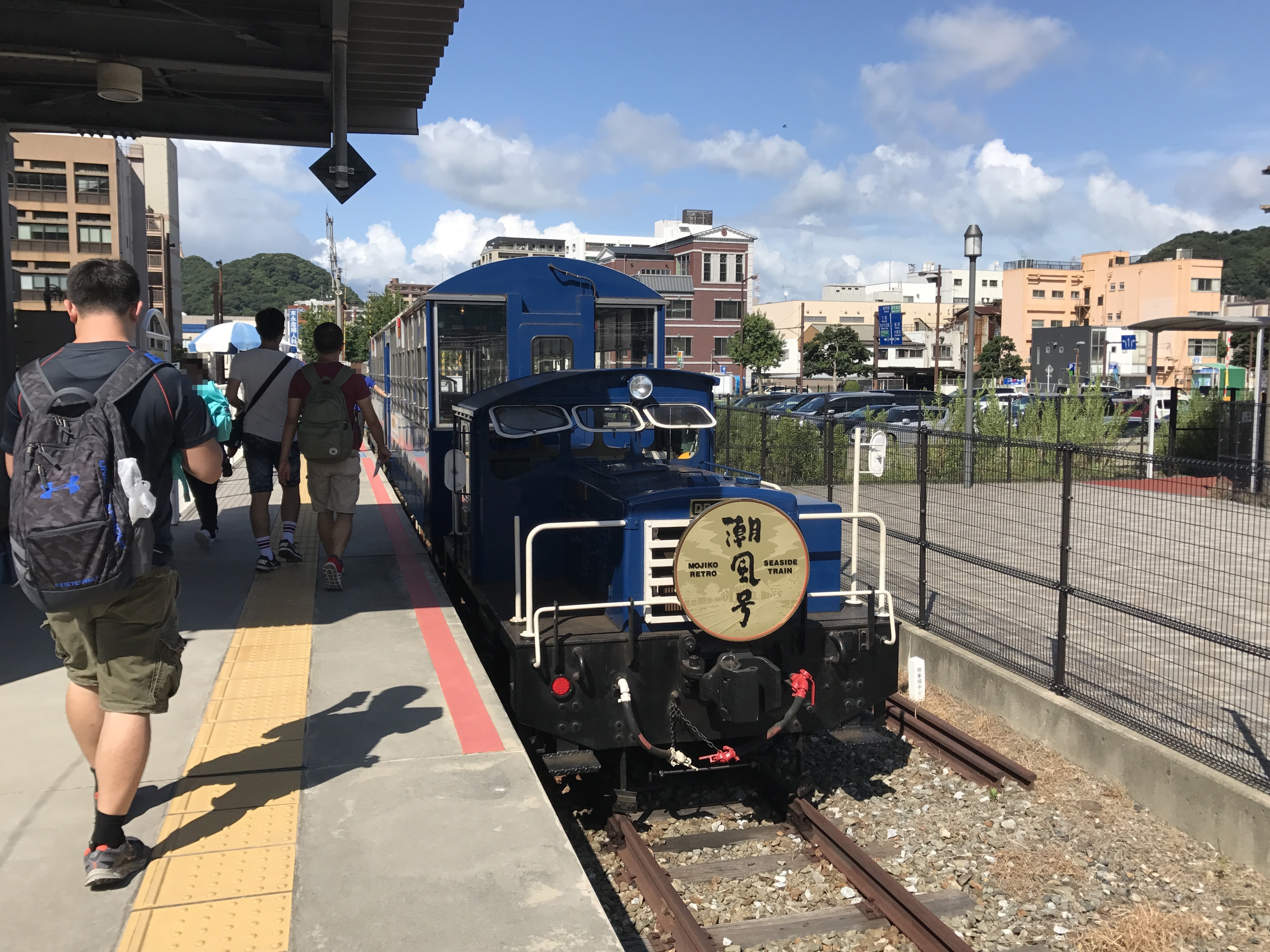
The Shiokaze at Kyushu Railway History Museum Station

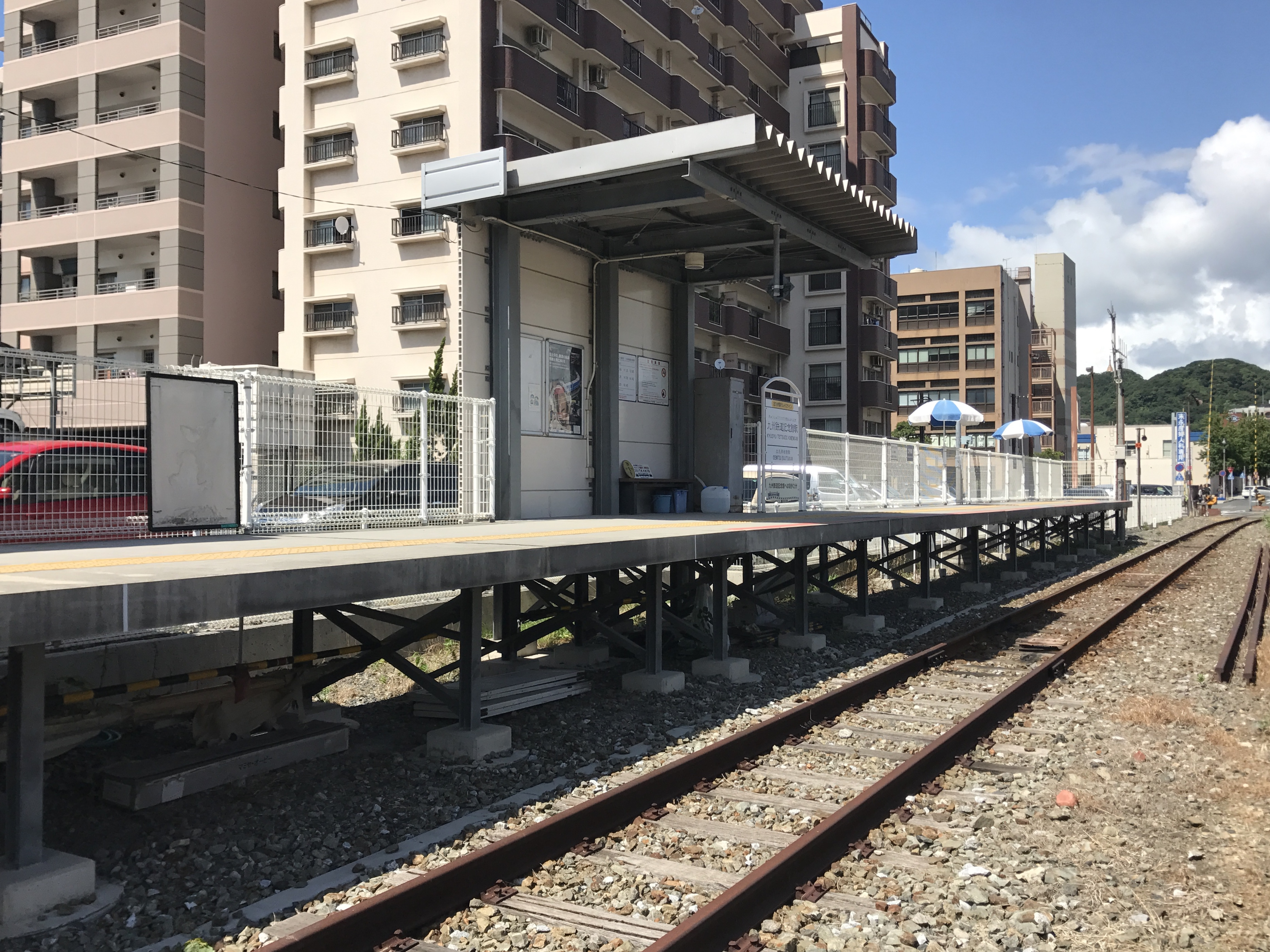
Station platform
