= Norfolk Hiroba Station =

Railway station located in Kitakyushu, Fukuoka

Norfolk Hiroba Station ノーフォーク広場駅
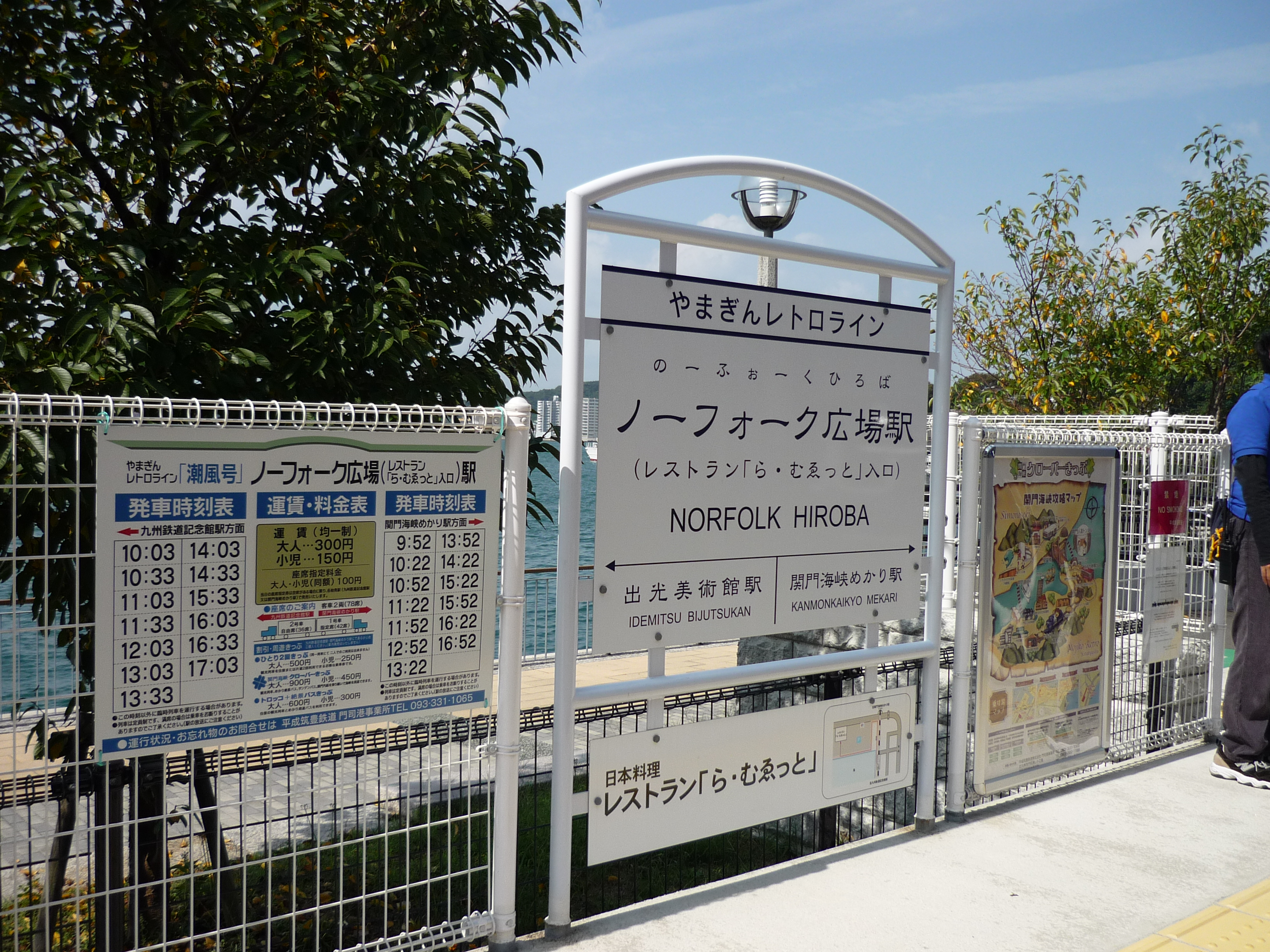
- Station sign

General information
- Location: Kitakyushu, Fukuoka; Japan
- Coordinates: 33.9559°N 130.9643°E
- Operator: Heisei Chikuhō Railway
- Line: Mojikō Retro Scenic Line
- Distance: 1.4 km from Kyushu Railway History Museum
- Platforms: 1 side platform

Construction
- Structure type: At-grade

History
- Opened: 26 April 2009
Location

Norfolk Hiroba (ノーフォーク広場駅, Nōfōku-Hiroba-eki) is a train station in Moji ward of Kitakyushu, Fukuoka Prefecture, Japan. It is on the Mojikō Retro Scenic Line, a heritage railway operated by the Heisei Chikuhō Railway.

== Overview ==
Only a single four-car passenger train named the Shiokaze (潮風号) serves this station, operating between March and November. Except for certain weeks, trains only operate on the weekends and holidays. Eleven round-trip services are run per day at 40-minute intervals.
