= Komorie Station =

Railway station in Kitakyushu, Japan

JA 30 Komorie Station 小森江駅
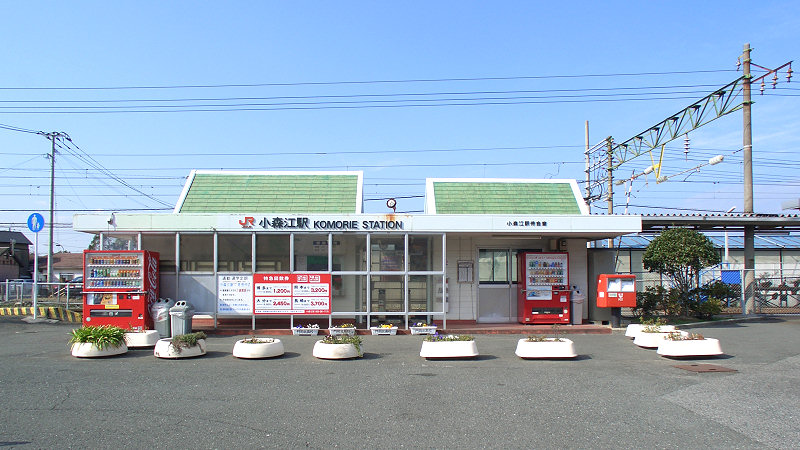
- The station building in January 2007

General information
- Location: 3-11 Komorie, Moji-ku, Kitakyūshū-shi, Fukuoka-ken 800-0062; Japan
- Coordinates: 33°55′00″N 130°56′20″E
- Operator: JR Kyushu
- Line: JA Kagoshima Main Line
- Distance: 4.0 km (2.5 mi) from Mojikō
- Platforms: 2 side platforms
- Tracks: 2

Construction
- Structure type: At grade

Other information
- Status: Unattended
- Station code: JA30
- Website: Official website

History
- Opened: 13 March 1988; 38 years ago

Passengers
- FY2020: 1165

Services
Preceding station	JR Kyushu	Following station
Moji JA 29 towards Kagoshima	Kagoshima Main Line Rapid Semi Rapid Local	Mojikō JA 31 Terminus
Location
- Location within Fukuoka Prefecture Location within Kyushu Location within Japan

Komorie Station (小森江駅, Komorie-eki) is a passenger railway station located in Moji-ku, Kitakyushu, Japan, operated by Kyushu Railway Company (JR Kyushu).

== Lines ==
Komorie Station is served by the Kagoshima Main Line, and is located 4.0 km from the starting point of the line at Mojikō.

== Station layout ==
The station consists of two opposed side platforms, connected to the station building by a level crossing. The station is unattended.

=== Platforms ===
1	■ JA Kagoshima Main Line	for Mojikō
2	■ JA Kagoshima Main Line	for Kokura and Hakata

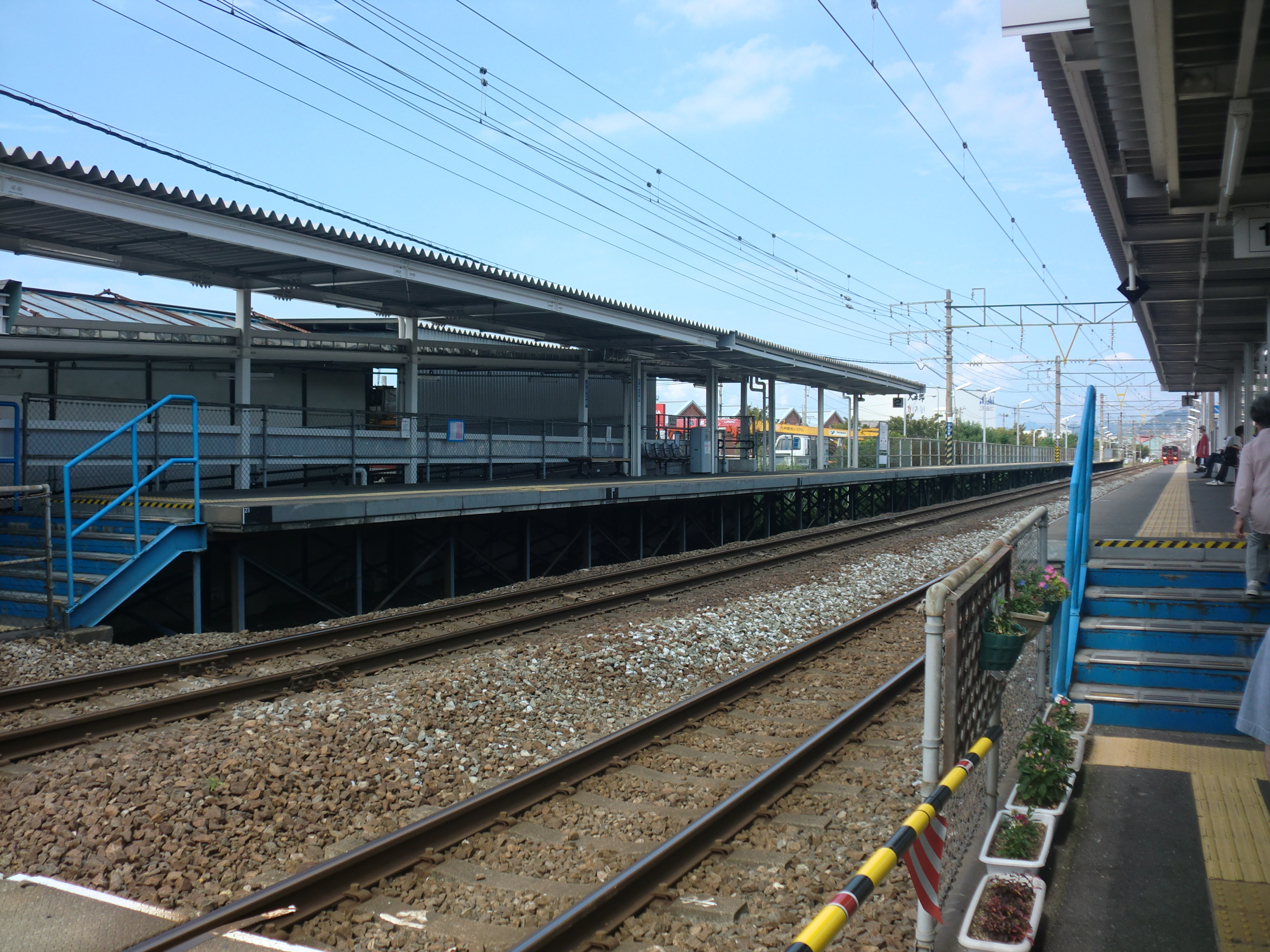
The platforms in September 2012

== History ==
The station opened on 13 March 1988.

== Passenger statistics ==
In fiscal 2020, the station was used by a daily average of 1165 boarding passengers.

== Surrounding area ==
- National Route 3
- National Route 199
- Moji Hospital

== See also ==
- List of railway stations in Japan
