= Moji Station =

Railway station in Kitakyushu, Japan

JA 29 JA 52 Moji Station 門司駅
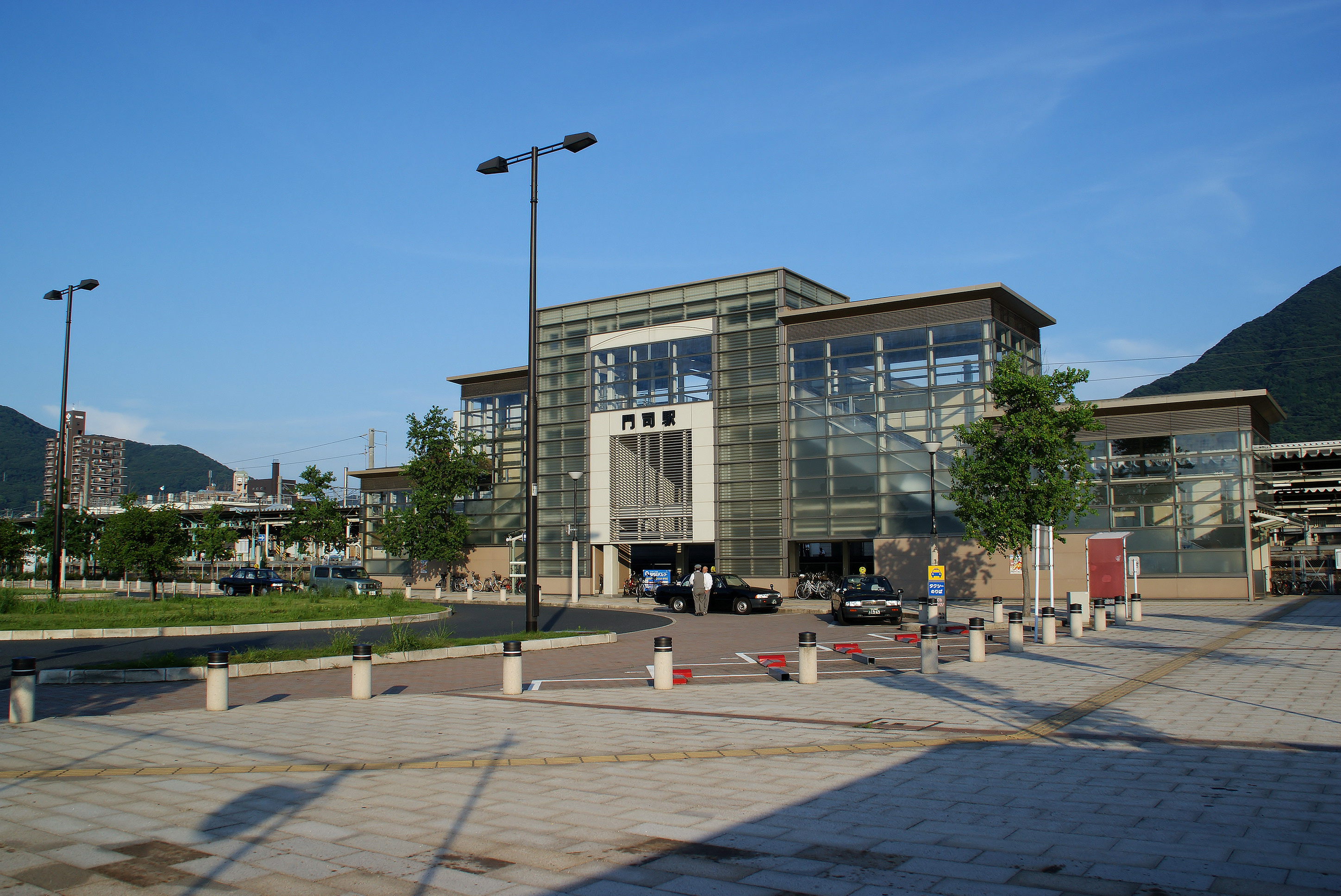
- Station building

General information
- Location: 2-1 Nakamachi, Moji-ku, Kitakyūshū-shi, Fukuoka-ken; Japan
- Coordinates: 33°54′15″N 130°55′59.3″E
- Operator: JR Kyushu
- Line: JAKagoshima Main Line JASan'yo Main Line
- Distance: 5.5 km from Mojikō (starting point of the Kagoshima Main Line); 0.0 km (station is the starting point of the San'yo Main Line)
- Platforms: 3 island platforms
- Tracks: 6

Construction
- Structure type: At grade

Other information
- Status: Staffed (Midori no Madoguchi)
- Website: Official website

History
- Opened: 1 April 1891; 135 years ago
- Former names: Ōsato Station (to 1942)

Passengers
- 2021 (Daily): 5,120

Services
Preceding station	JR Kyushu	Following station
Kokura JA 28 towards Kagoshima	Kagoshima Main Line Rapid Semi Rapid Local	Komorie JA 30 towards Mojikō
Terminus	San'yō Line	Shimonoseki JA 53 Terminus
Location
- Location within Fukuoka Prefecture Location within Japan

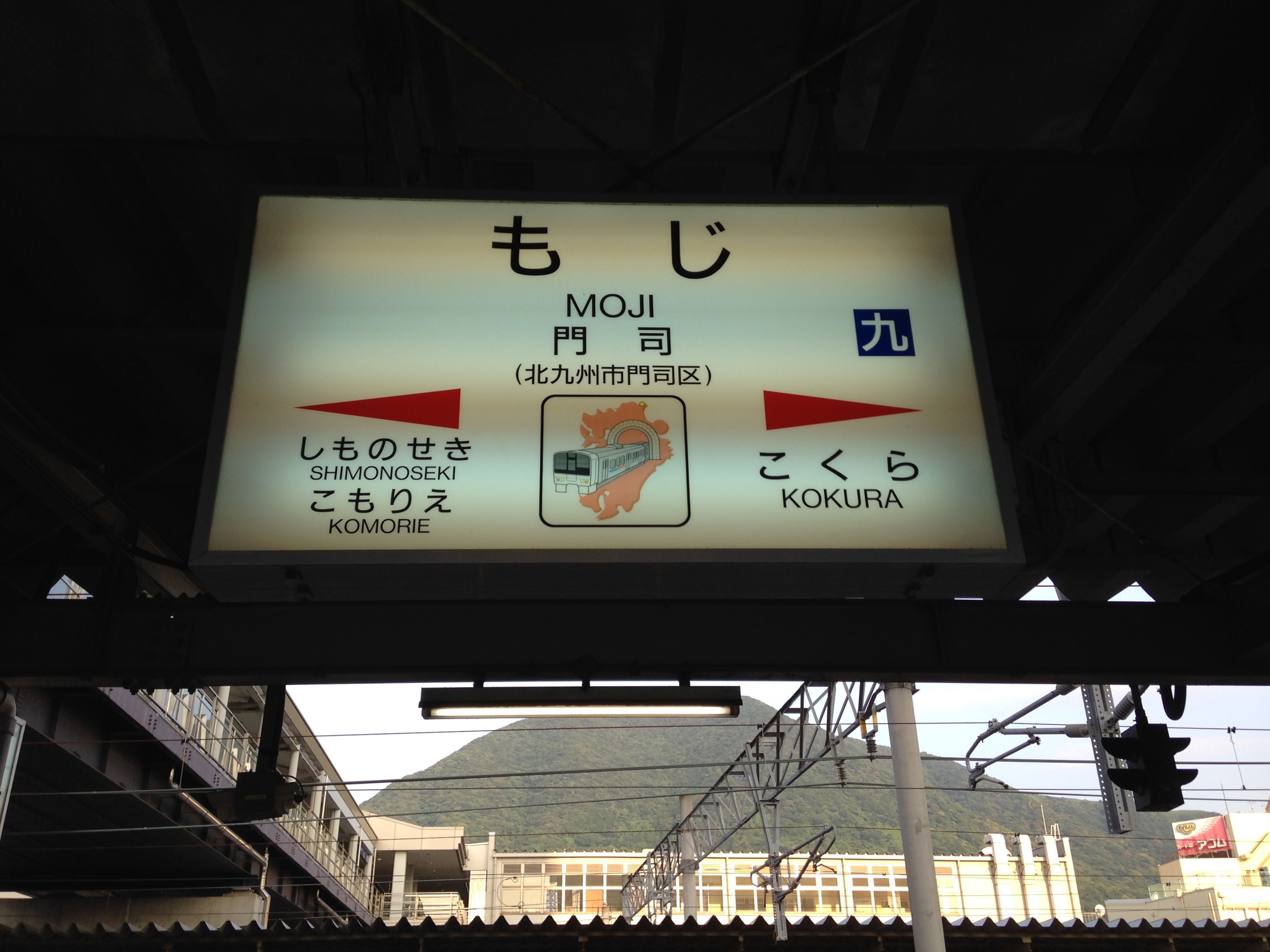
Station sign

Moji Station (門司駅, Moji-eki) is a junction passenger railway station located in Moji-ku, Kitakyushu, Fukuoka Prefecture, Japan. It is operated by JR Kyushu.

== Lines ==
The station is served by the Kagoshima Main Line and is located 5.5 km from the starting point of the line at Mojikō. It is also the terminus of the San'yo Main Line and is 534.4 kilometers from the opposing terminus of that line at Kōbe. Local and weekday rapid services on the Chikuhi Line stop at this station.

== Station layout ==
The station consists of three island platforms serving six tracks, with a three-story bridge station building which was completed in 2004. The station has a Midori no Madoguchi staffed ticket office.

=== Platforms ===
1	■ JA Kagoshima Main Line	for Kokura and Hakata
2, 3, 4	■ JA Kagoshima Main Line	for Kokura and Hakata
2, 3, 4	■ JF Nippo Main Line	for Yukuhashi and Nakatsu
2, 3, 4	■ JA San'yo Main Line	for Shimonoseki
5, 6	■ JA San'yo Main Line	for Shimonoseki
5, 6	■ JA Kagoshima Main Line	for Mojikō

== History ==
The station opened as Dairi Station (大里駅) on the Kyushu Railway on 1 April 1891. The railway was nationalized in 1907. On 1 April 1942, due to the completion of the Kanmon Railway Tunnel, the station was relocated approximately 400 meters toward Kagoshima and renamed Moji Station. At the same time, the current Mojiko Station was renamed from Moji Station to Mojiko Station. With the privatization of JNR on 1 April 1987, control of the station passed to JR Kyushu.

== Passenger statistics ==
In fiscal 2020, the station was used by an average of 4,876 passengers daily (boarding passengers only), and it ranked 29th among the busiest stations of JR Kyushu.

== Surrounding area ==
The station is located at the western end of Moji Ward. The area around the station is an urban area, but the center of Moji Ward is the area around Mojiko Station. Japan National Route 3 runs parallel to the railroad tracks in front of the station's south exit.

== See also ==
- List of railway stations in Japan
