= Mojikō Retro Scenic Line =

Railway line in Kitakyushu, Japan

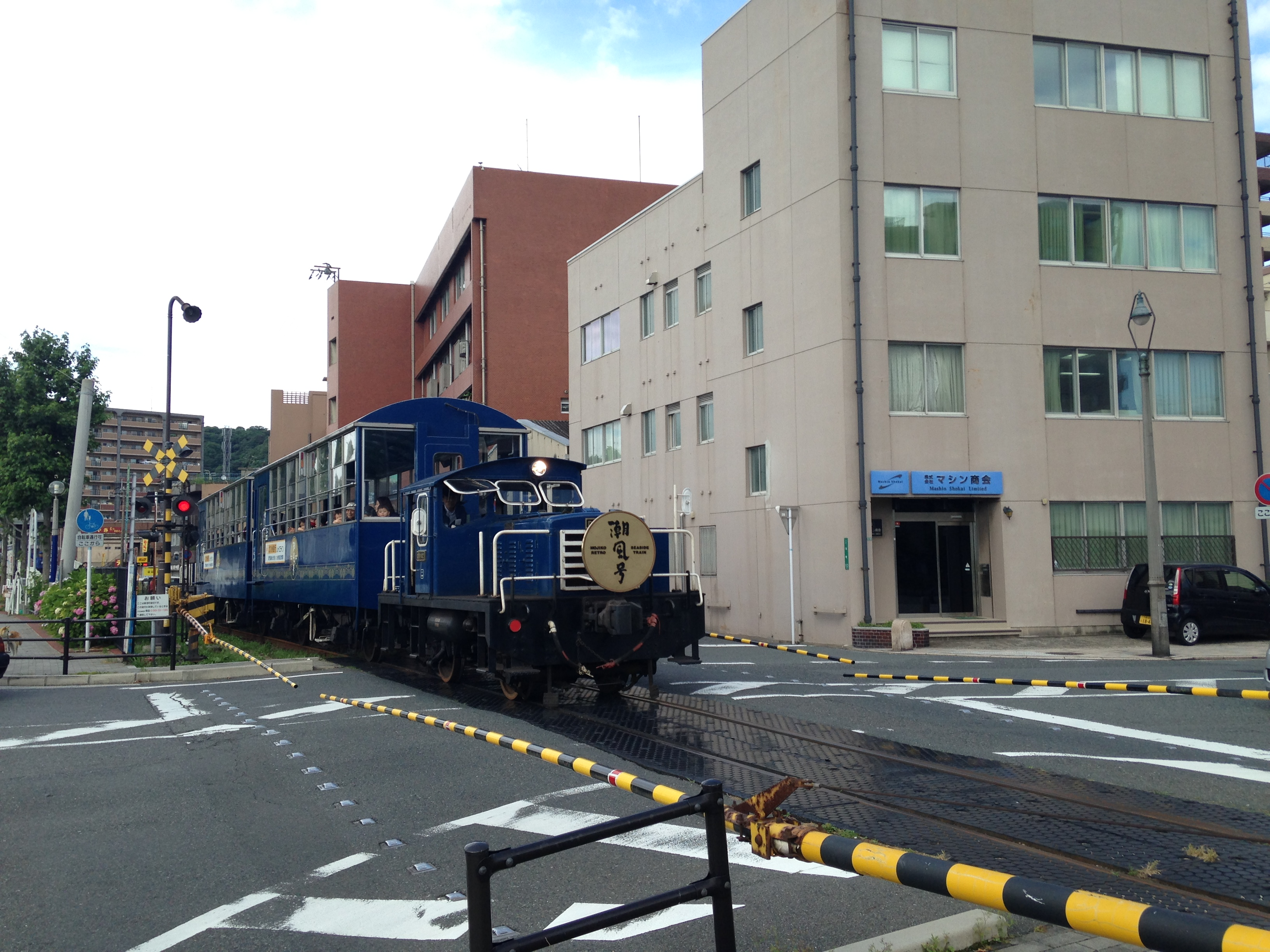
- The Shiokaze near Idemitsu Art Museum Station

Overview
- Native name: 門司港レトロ観光線
- Owner: Kitakyushu City
- Locale: Moji-ku, Kitakyushu; Fukuoka Prefecture
- Termini: Kyushu Railway History Museum; Kanmonkaikyō Mekari
- Stations: 4
- Website: www.retro-line.net

Service
- Type: Heritage railway
- Operator: Heisei Chikuhō Railway
- Depot: Setomachi

History
- Work began: 13 March 2008
- Opened: 26 April 2009; 17 years ago

Technical
- Line length: 2.1 km (1.3 mi)
- Number of tracks: 1
- Track gauge: 1,067 mm (3 ft 6 in)
- Electrification: None
- Operating speed: 15 km/h (9.3 mph)

The Mojikō Retro Scenic Line (Japanese: 門司港レトロ観光線, Hepburn: Mojikō-Retoro-Kankō-sen) is a 2.1-kilometre (1.3 mi) heritage railway line owned by Kitakyushu City and operated by Heisei Chikuhō Railway. The line runs on a former freight route in Moji-ku, Kitakyushu, Fukuoka Prefecture, Japan. One passenger train named the Shiokaze (潮風号) runs on the track.

== History ==
Various railroads have operated in the Moji area in the past, including a line by JR Freight to Sotohama Station (near present day Idemitsu Art Museum Station) and a private passenger line known as the "Tanoura Public Rinkai Line" (田野浦公共臨港鉄道). After the closure of these lines, multiple proposals were made to preserve these lines as a heritage railway. One such proposal by the Heisei Chikuhō Railway was finally approved on March 13, 2008 between Mojikō Station and Mekari Park (now Kanmon Straits Mekari Station).

In preparation for its reopening, promotional events were held on the tracks throughout 2008. Plans for the railroad was formally announced January 2009, and naming rights to the station were sold before its formal opening on April 26. For their preservation efforts, Kitakyushu City was awarded a "Railroad Cultural and Tourism Award" by the Ministry of Land, Infrastructure, Transport and Tourism.

The 2018 Japan floods heavily damaged the tracks, forcing the line to be closed for a month.

== Operations ==
One four-car passenger train named the Shiokaze (潮風号) runs on the track. The line operates year-round (previously, only between March and November). Except for certain weeks such as during the Obon period, trains only operate on weekends and holidays. Eleven round-trip services are run per day at 40-minute intervals.

Though operated by the Heisei Chikuhō Railway, this line does not connect to the rest of Heichiku's network. The line is not electrified and is single-tracked for the entire line.

== Stations ==
All stations are within Moji-ku, Kitakyushu, Fukuoka Prefecture.

Name	Distance in km (mi)	Connections
Kyushu Railway History Museum 九州鉄道記念館	0 (0)	Kagoshima Main Line (Mojikō: JA31)
Idemitsu Art Museum 出光美術館	0.5 (0.31)	
Norfolk Hiroba ノーフォーク広場	1.4 (0.87)	
Kanmonkaikyō Mekari 関門海峡めかり	2.1 (1.3)	
