= Moji-ku =

Ward of Kitakyūshū, in Fukuoka Prefecture, Japan

Coordinates: 33°56′28″N 130°57′35″E

Location of Moji-ku in Kitakyūshū

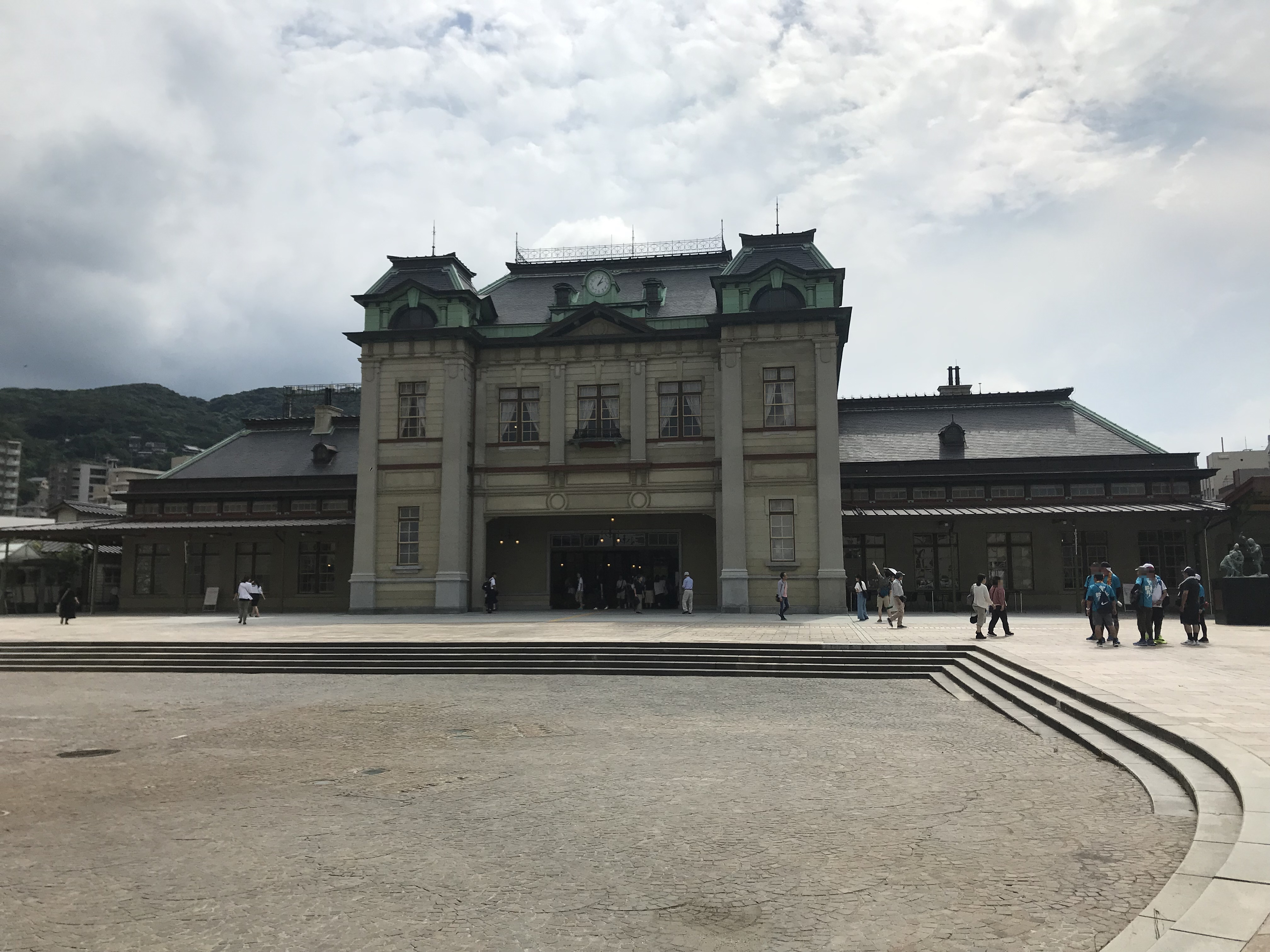
Mojikō Station

Moji-ku (門司区) is a Japanese ward of the city of Kitakyushu in Fukuoka Prefecture. It is the former city of Moji which was one of five merged to create Kitakyūshū in 1963. It faces the city of Shimonoseki across the Kanmon Straits between Honshū and Kyūshū.

The ward's area is 73.37 km^{2}. It had a population of 114,754 as of 2000.

== History ==
Moji was first made into a port by Suematsu Kenchō with the financial backing of Shibusawa Eiichi in 1889. It was chiefly used for the transportation of coal, though there is a traditional song about the sale of bananas imported into Moji from Southeast Asia which survives to this day (Banana no tataki-uri).

An imperial decree in July 1899 established Moji as an open port for trading with the United States and the United Kingdom.

In 1905, Moji was the departure point for many troops in the Russo-Japanese War who were ferried to Korea.

== Tourism ==
=== The Mojiko Retro District ===
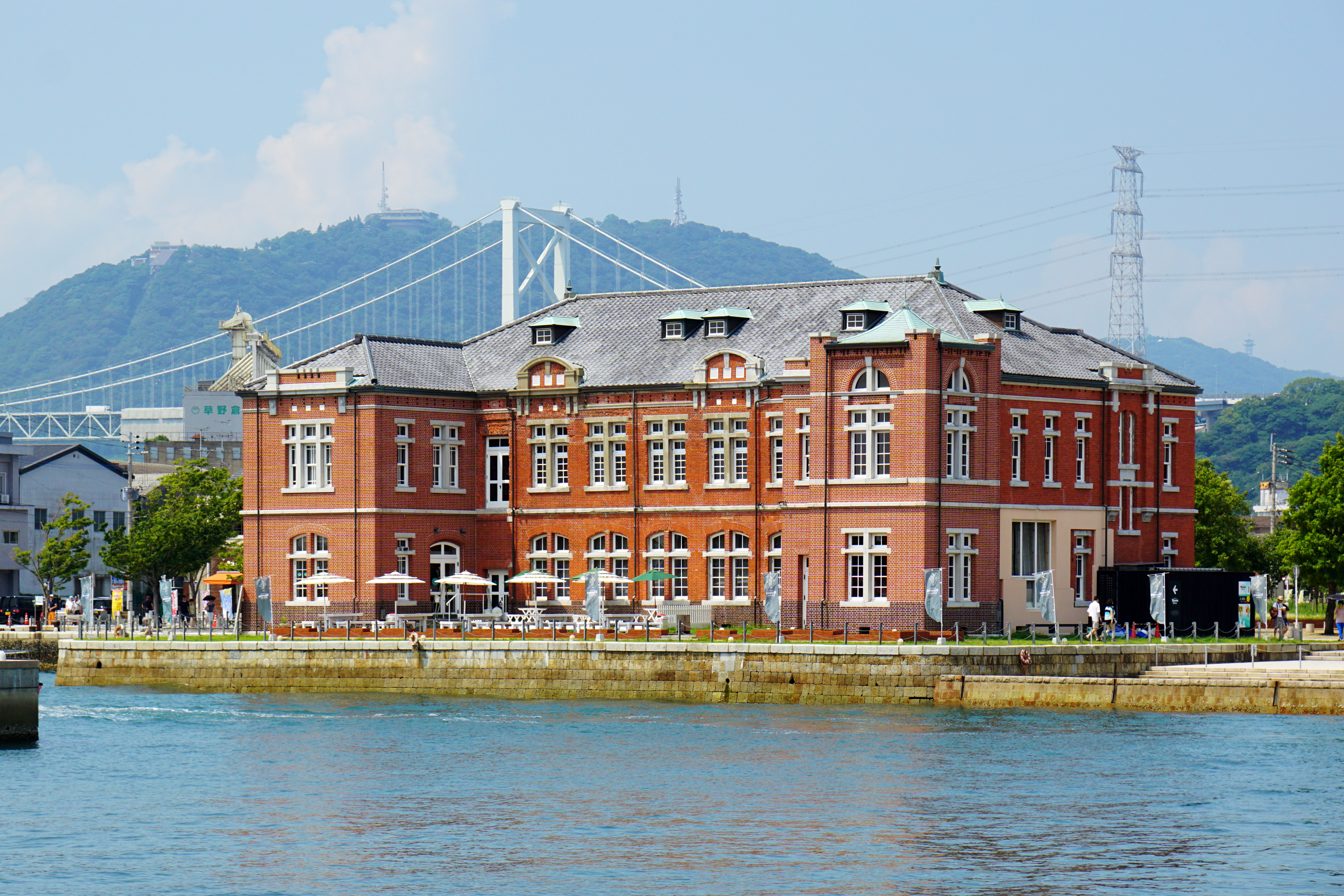
Former Moji customs building, Mojiko Retro

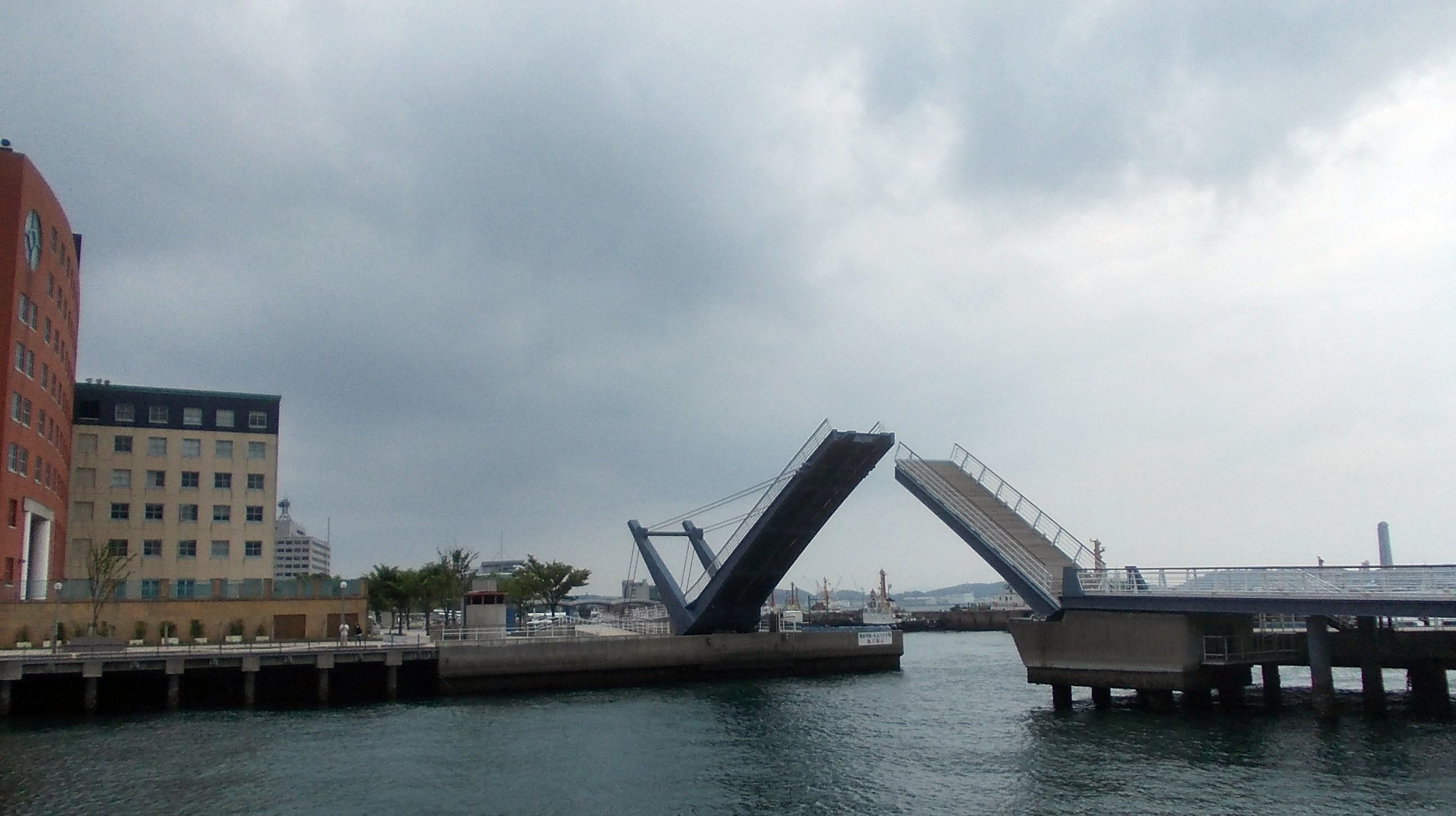
Blue Wing, a unique pedestrian drawbridge

Mojiko Retro, which officially opened under this name as a tourist site in 1995, is a historical area centered on JR Kyushu's Mojiko Station, which is a replica of Rome's Termini Station and is designated an Important Cultural Property of Japan.

The area boasts many interesting historic buildings. For instance, the former Moji Mitsui Club once hosted Dr. Albert Einstein and his wife when they visited Japan in the 1920s. Recent developments along the waterfront, such as the renovated customs building, a striking new hotel and the a unique pedestrian Blue Wing drawbridge add to the charm of Mojiko and make it a pleasant place to stroll.

=== Others ===
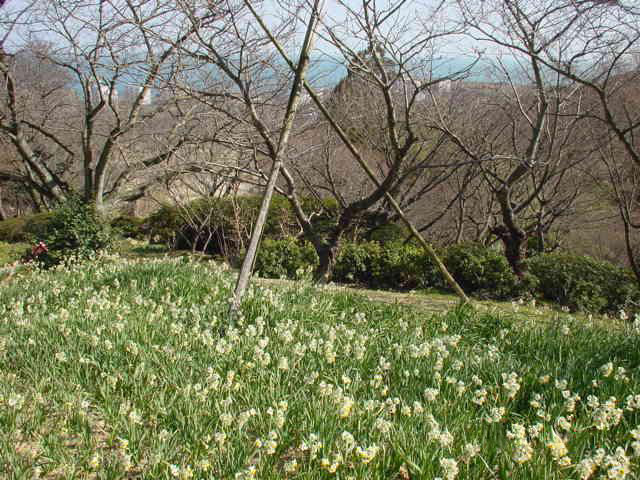
Shiranoe botanical gardens

- The Shiranoe botanical gardens face the Seto Inland Sea.
- Kanmon Kaikyo Fireworks Festival.

== Transport ==
Several ferry companies connect Kitakyushu with Tokyo and Osaka via Shin-Moji port on the Seto Inland Sea.

Moji is served by the Kagoshima Main Line, operated by JR Kyushu, and the Mojikō Retro Scenic Line, operated by Heichiku. Rail tunnels connect Kyushu and Honshu via Moji Station.
