= Mojikō Station =

Railway station in Kitakyushu, Japan

Coordinates: 33°56′42″N 130°57′41″E

JA 31 Mojikō Station 門司港駅
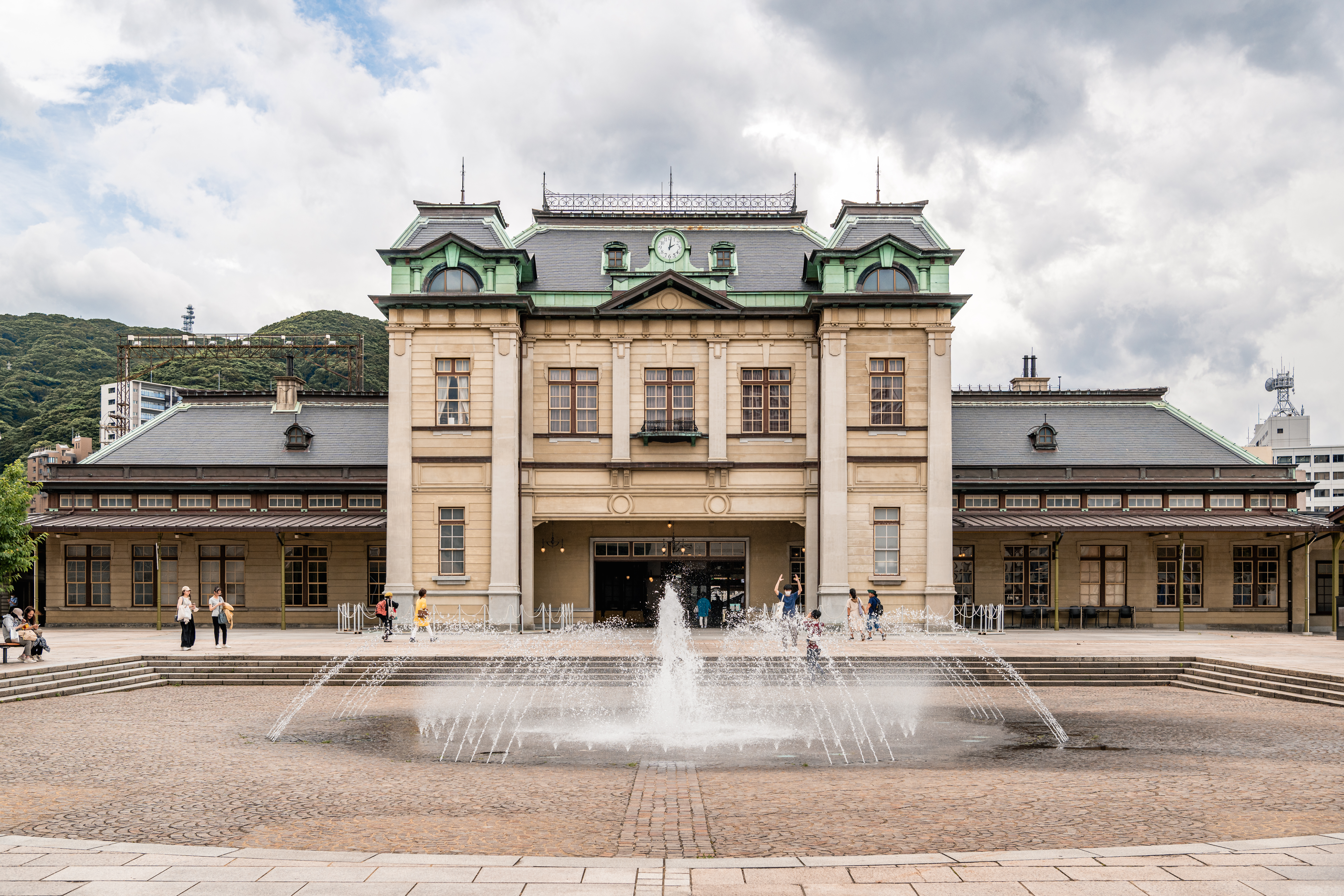
- Mojikō Station in June 2025

General information
- Location: 1-5-31 Nishi-Kaigan; Moji-ku, Kitakyūshū, Fukuoka; Japan
- Operator: JR Kyushu
- Line: Kagoshima Main Line
- Platforms: 2 island platforms
- Tracks: 4
- Connections: Mojikō Retro Scenic Line via Kyushu Railway History Museum Station

Construction
- Structure type: At grade

Other information
- Station code: JA31
- Website: Official website

History
- Opened: 1 April 1891; 135 years ago

Services
Preceding station	JR Kyushu	Following station
Komorie JA 30 towards Kagoshima	Kagoshima Main Line Rapid Semi Rapid Local	Terminus
Location
- Location within Kitakyushu Location within Fukuoka Prefecture Location within Kyushu Location within Japan

Mojiko Station (Japanese: 門司港駅, Hepburn: Mojikō-eki) is a railway station at the northern terminus of the Kagoshima Main Line in the Moji ward of Kitakyushu, Fukuoka Prefecture, Japan, operated by the Kyushu Railway Company (JR Kyushu). Prior to the opening of the Kanmon Railway Tunnel in 1942, it served as the gateway to Kyushu island, with frequent ferry service to Shimonoseki Station on the Honshu side of the Kanmon Straits. The station building is recognised by the Japanese government as an Important Cultural Property, and is now a popular tourist attraction.

== History ==
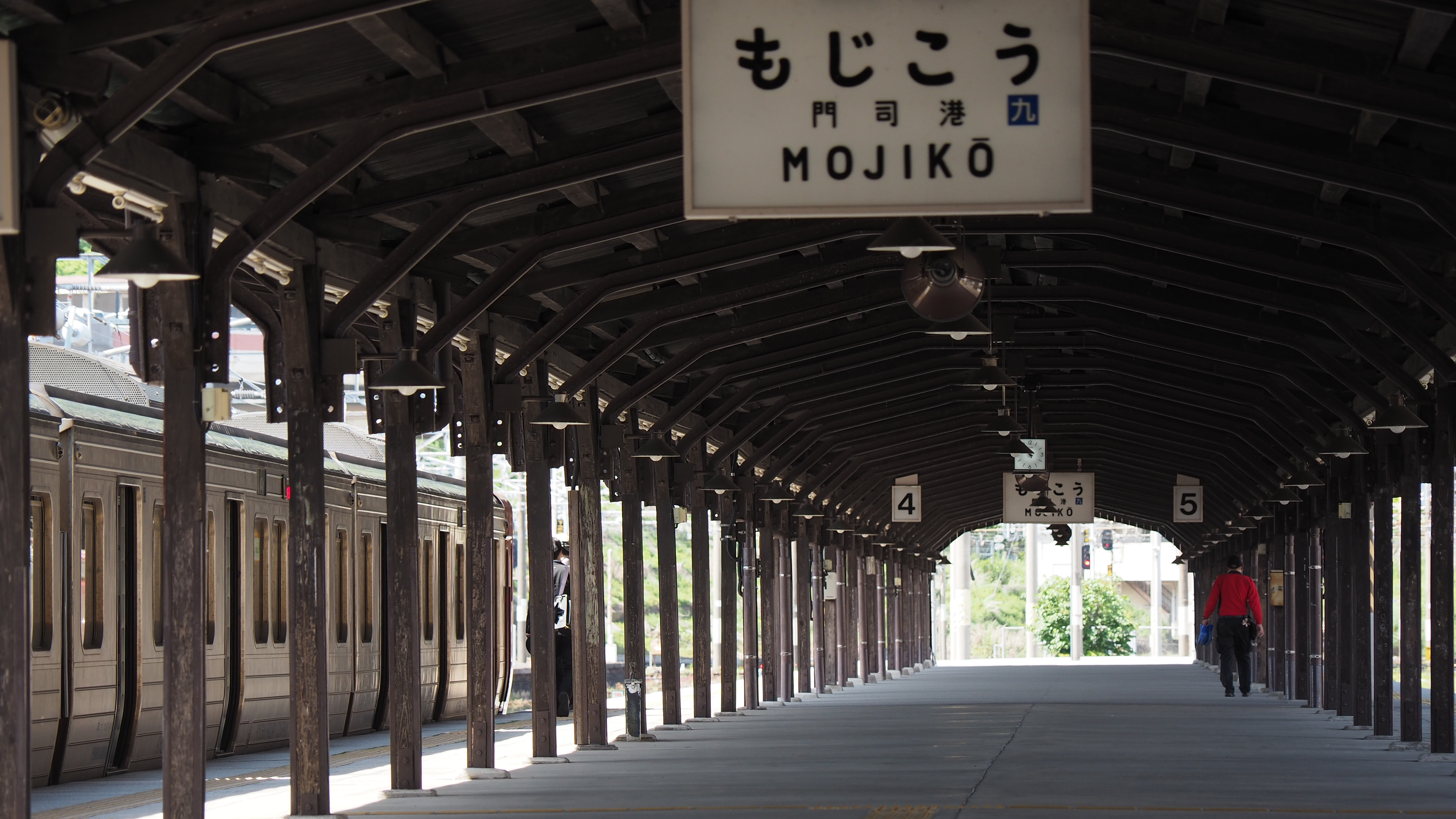
Platforms 4 & 5

The station opened as the starting point for Kyushu's railway network with the name "Moji Station" on 1 April 1891, serving as the northern terminus of the Kagoshima Main Line. The original station building was located to the east of the current structure, behind what is now the Moji branch of Kitakyushu Bank. Ferry service to Shimonoseki Station on the Honshu side of the Kanmon Straits began on 27 May 1901. Now linked with Honshu's railway network, the station became a hub for transport between the two islands. From October 1911, however, goods services were redirected to a new train ferry operated between Komorie Station and Shimonoseki, with Moji Station primarily relegated to passenger use.

The current Neo-Renaissance-style station building was completed in 1914. The station retained its status as the starting point for Kyushu's railway network, but when the Kanmon Railway Tunnel opened in 1942, it ceased to play any part in cross-strait transport. The nearby Dairi Station, now the focal point for connections with Honshu's San'yō Main Line, was renamed Moji Station, and this station was given its present name of "Mojikō" (門司港, lit. 'Moji Harbour'). During the Second World War, three people were killed in an American bombing of the station on 5 March 1945. Scars left by bomb damage were discovered during the 21st century restoration of the building.

Even after the opening of the Kanmon Tunnel, Mojikō continued to serve as a hub for railway management, with the Moji Railway Administration Bureau and Japanese National Railways (JNR) Kyushu Directorate located adjacent to the station complex. With the privatization of JNR on 1 April 1987, the station came under the control of JR Kyushu, which maintained two corporate headquarters, one at Mojikō and one in Fukuoka. The Mojikō HQ was closed in 2000, with all operations moved to the Fukuoka offices. The station, which was recognised as an Important Cultural Property by the Japanese government on 18 November 1988, then became popular with tourists as part of the "Mojikō Retro" area.

From 29 September 2012, the station building was closed for major restoration works. The refurbished station reopened on 10 March 2019.

== Facilities ==
The station has a "Midori no Madoguchi" staffed ticket counter.

== Passenger statistics ==
In fiscal 2024, the station was used by an average of 4,902 passengers daily (boarding passengers only), making it JR Kyushu's 43rd busiest station.

== Surrounding area ==
Mojikō Station is the gateway to the various tourist attractions and old buildings that have been preserved in the nearby area under the name "Mojikō Retro".

The Kyushu Railway History Museum is located adjacent to the station. The Mojikō Retro Scenic heritage railway line, which is operated by local railway company Heichiku, stops at the nearby Kyushu Railway History Museum Station.

== Gallery ==
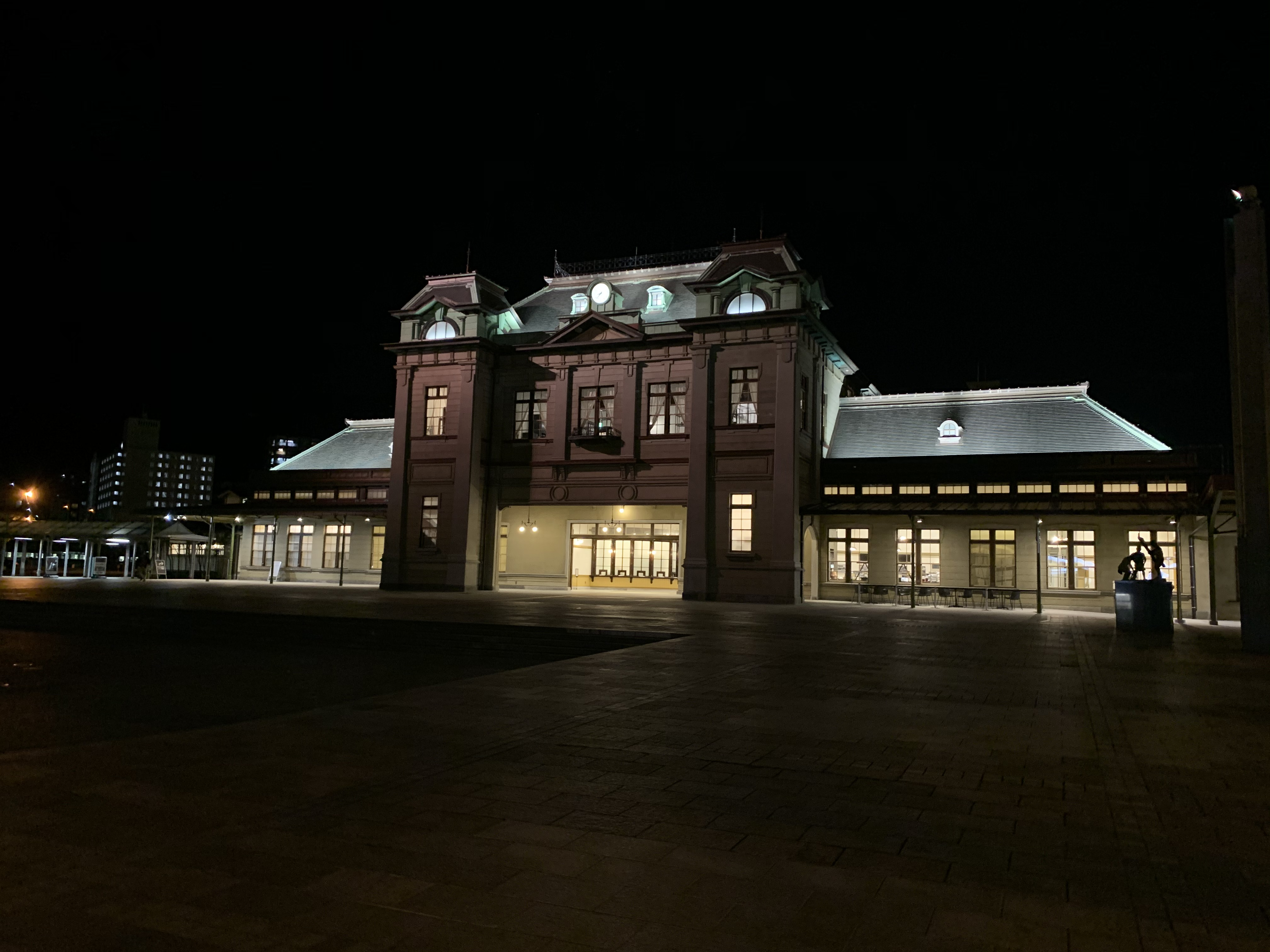
Mojikō Station at night, March 2020

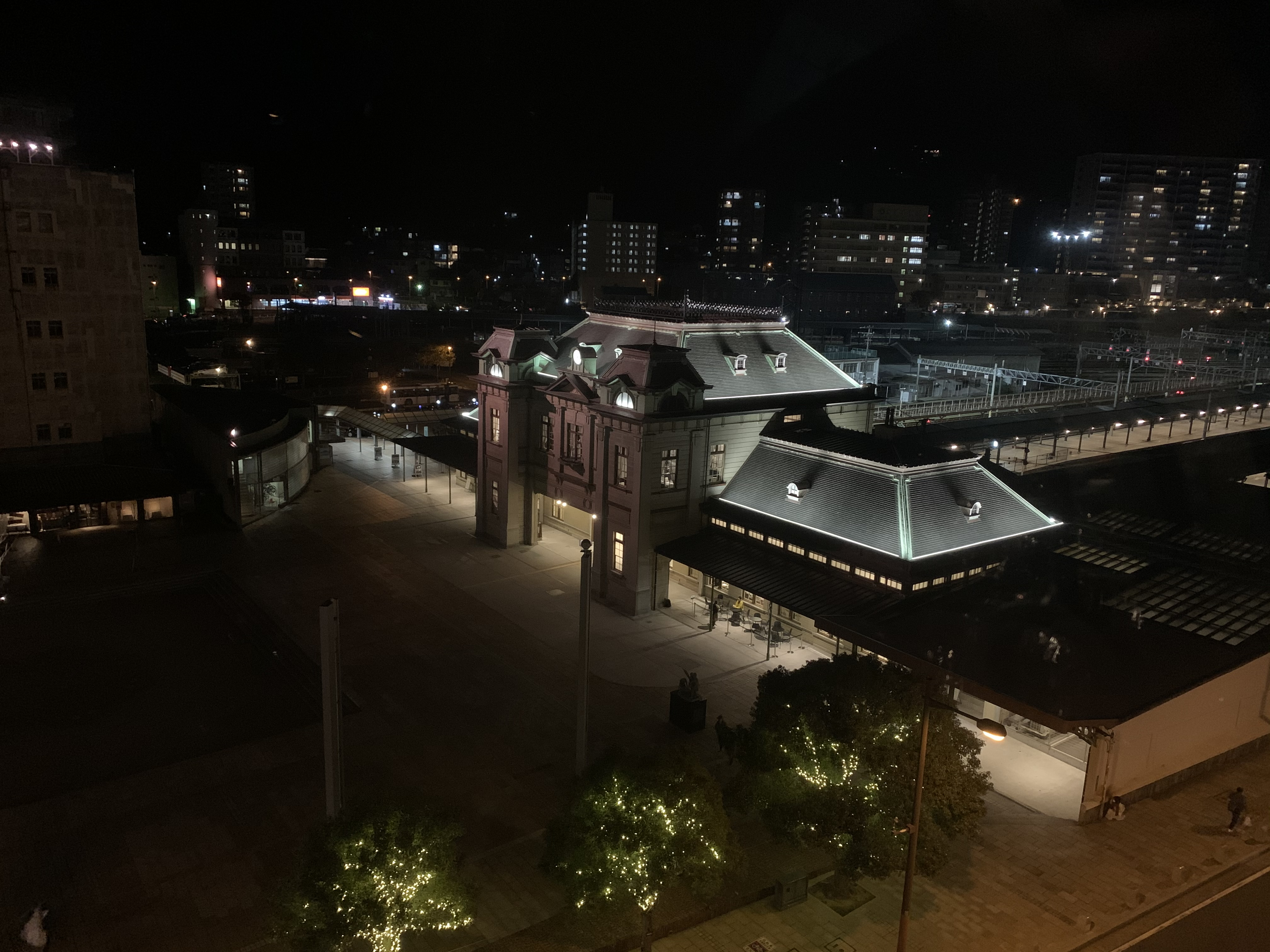
At night, March 2020

May 2019

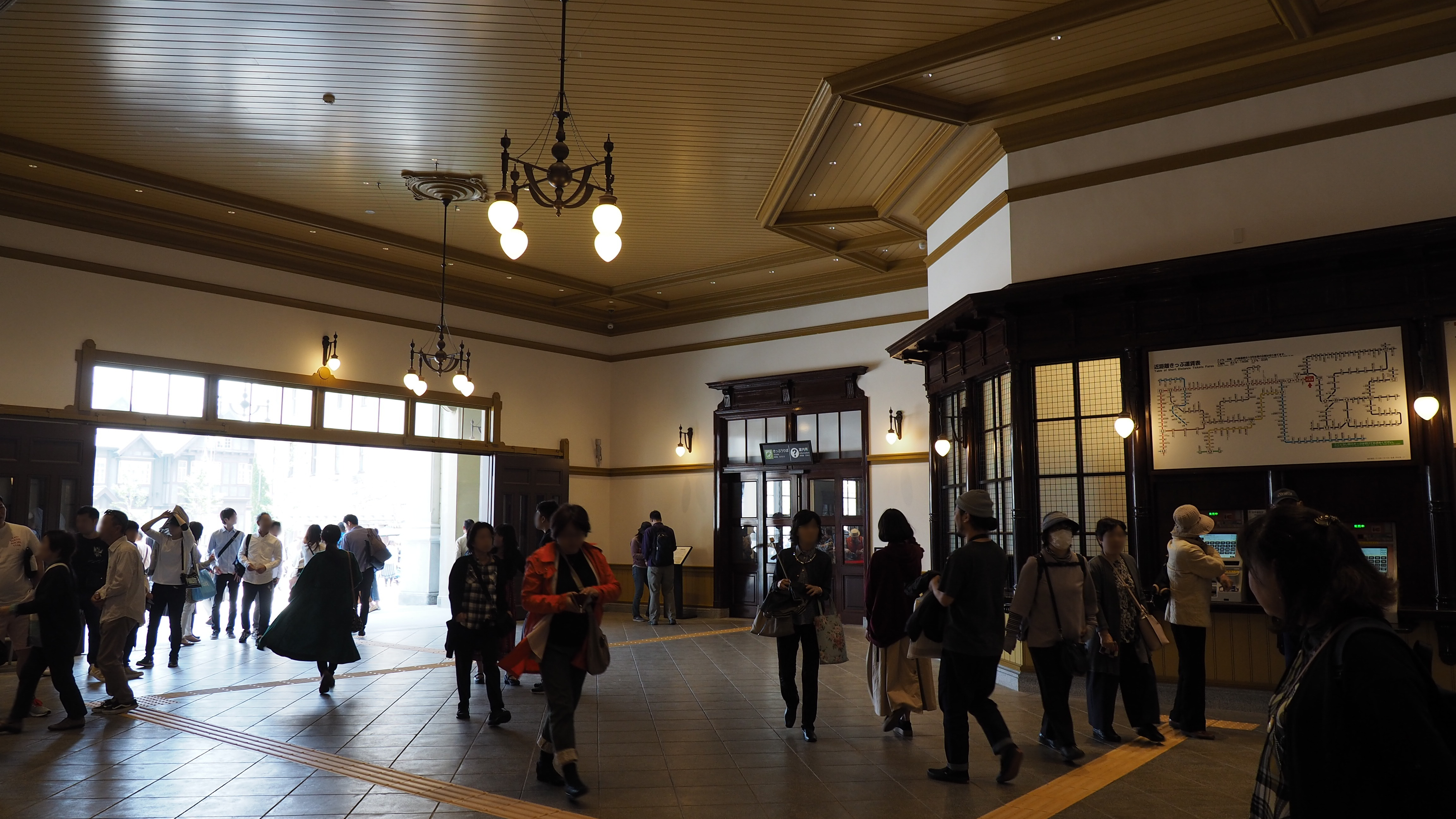
May 2019

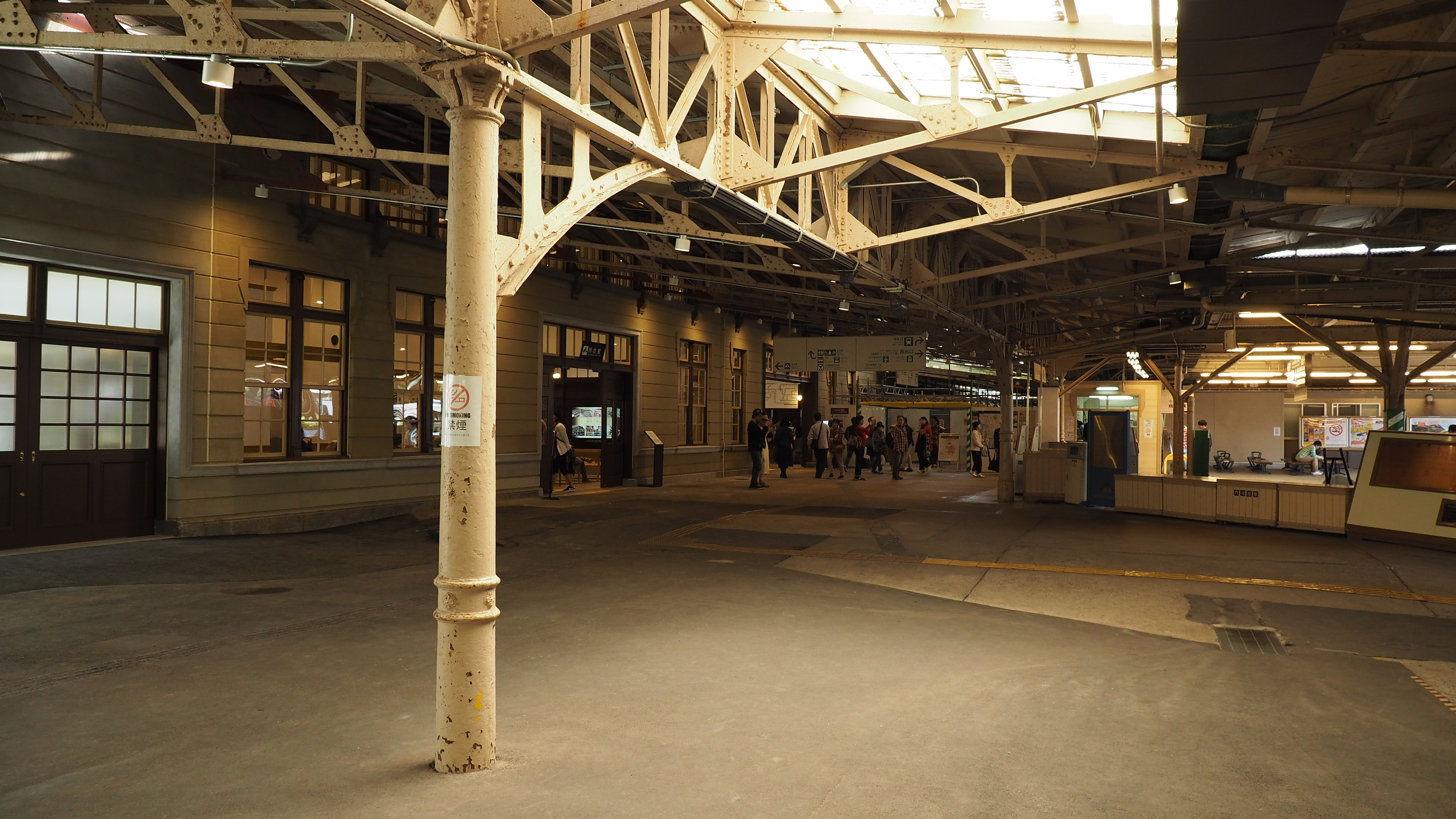
May 2019

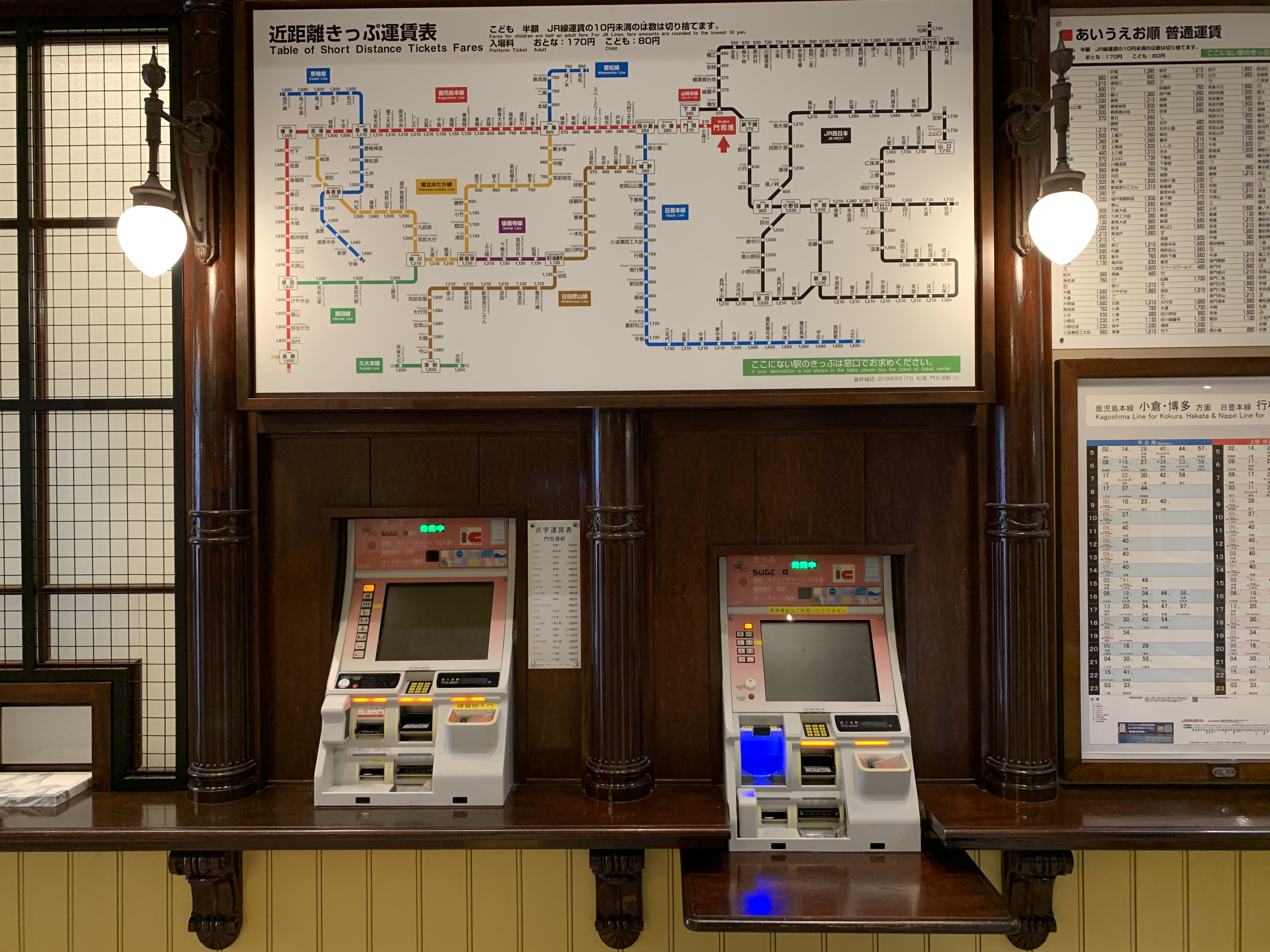
Ticket vending machines, March 2020

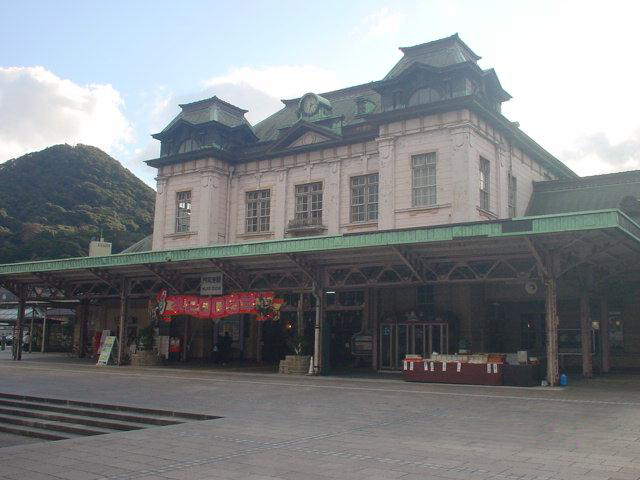
Mojikō Station in January 2005, prior to its restoration

== See also ==
- List of railway stations in Japan
- Kanmon Kaikyo Fireworks Festival
