= Kikuchi Castle =

Castle ruins in Kikuchi, Japan

- 城
- Kikuchi, Kumamoto Prefecture, Japan
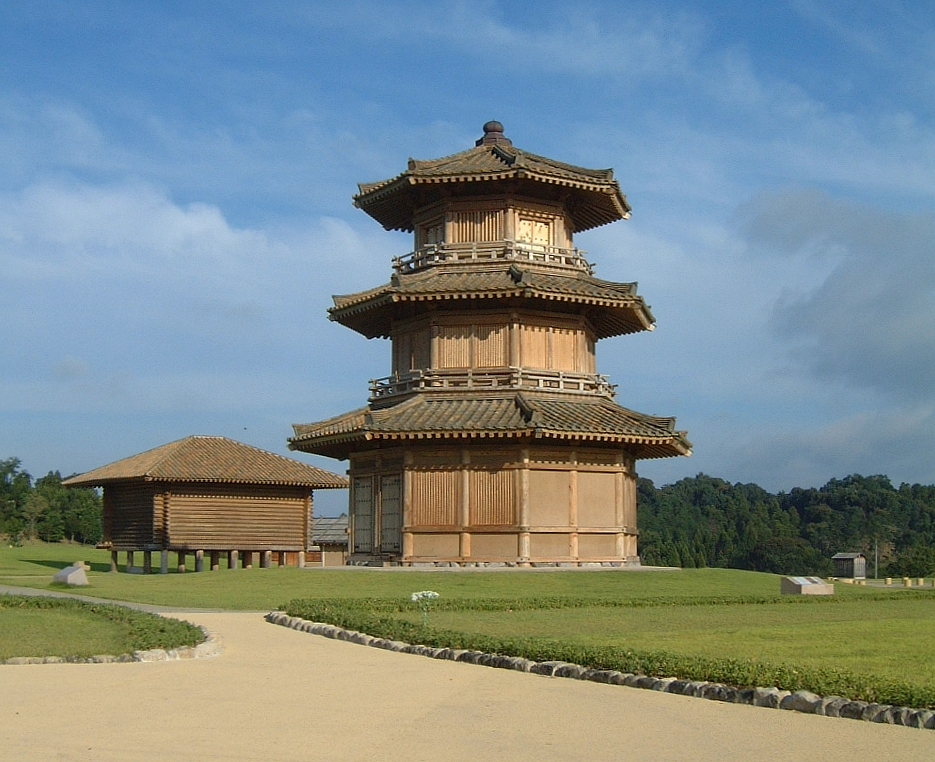
- Kikuchi Castle

Site information
- Type: Korean-style fortress
- Condition: Ruins; partial reconstruction

Site history
- Built: c.660s
- Built by: Yamato court
- In use: Asuka period
- Location of Kikuchi Castle and other major ancient mountain fortifications in Kyushu National Historic Site of Japan

Kikuchi Castle (鞠智城, Kikuchi-jo) was an ancient castle (also known as a Korean-style fortresses in Japan (朝鮮式山城, Chōsen-shiki yamajiro) in the city of Kikuchi, Kumamoto Prefecture Japan. Its ruins have been protected as a National Historic Site since 2004.

== History ==
After the defeat of the combined Baekje and Yamato Japan forces, at the hands of the Silla and Tang China alliance at the Battle of Hakusukinoe in 663, the Yamato court feared an invasion from either or both Tang or Silla. In response, a huge network of shore fortifications was constructed throughout the rest of the 600s, often with the assistance of Baekje engineers, generals and artisans. Unaware of the outbreak of the Silla-Tang War (670–676), the Japanese would continue to build fortifications until 701, even after finding out that Silla was no longer friendly with Tang. The name "kōgoishi" means "stones of divine protection," a name given them by the Meiji period archaeologist Tsuboi Shōgorō, who conjectured that they served as spiritual or practical protection for sacred sites. Scholars after Tsuboi determined that the structures are most likely the remains of practical, military fortifications, and were unlikely to have significant spiritual connections, although much remains unknown about these structures and there is very little contemporary documentary evidence.

Kikuchi Castle first appears in historical records in an entry in the Shoku Nihongi dated from the second year of Emperor Mommu's reign (698), which states that the Dazaifu Government Office repaired Ōno Castle, Kii Castle and Kikuchi Castle; its actual date of construction remains unknown. Archaeological excavations indicate that it existed for at least a 300 year period, from the late 7th century to the mid-10th century. Therefore, it is believed to have been built at about the same time as Mizuki, Ōno, and Kii Castles. In addition, the remains of two octagonal buildings and the discovery of a bronze standing Bodhisattva statue suggest that refugees from Baekje were involved.

The fortifications are located on a plateau at an elevation of 90 to 171 meters. The circumference of the castle walls, including the natural cliffs, is about 3.5 kilometers, and the castle area is about 55 hectares. It is located about 62 kilometers south of Dazaifu in a straight line, making it the southernmost ancient mountain castle. It is also about 30 kilometers inland, northeast of the mouth of the Kikuchi River, which flows into the Ariake Sea, and overlooks a river basin that is a fertile plain. The south side of the castle is located at a strategic point on a transportation route that is believed to have been an ancient official road. In addition to the unique discovery of octagonal-base buildings, the remains of three castle gates, earthworks, water gates, reservoirs, and other artifacts, such as wooden shipping tags and Baekje-style roof tiles have been found.

It is believed that the castle was renovated into a base for controlling northern Higo Province after the implementation of the Ritsuryō system at the end of the 7th century. From the second half of the 8th century onwards, it is believed that it was transformed into a facility specialising in the storage of goods, with a number of warehouses organized into row. .

The ruins have been developed as the "Kikuchi Castle Historical Park" and the octagonal drum tower, rice storehouse, barracks, and wooden storehouse have been restored and are open to the public. Kikuchi Castle was listed as one of the Continued Top 100 Japanese Castles in 2017.

== Gallery ==
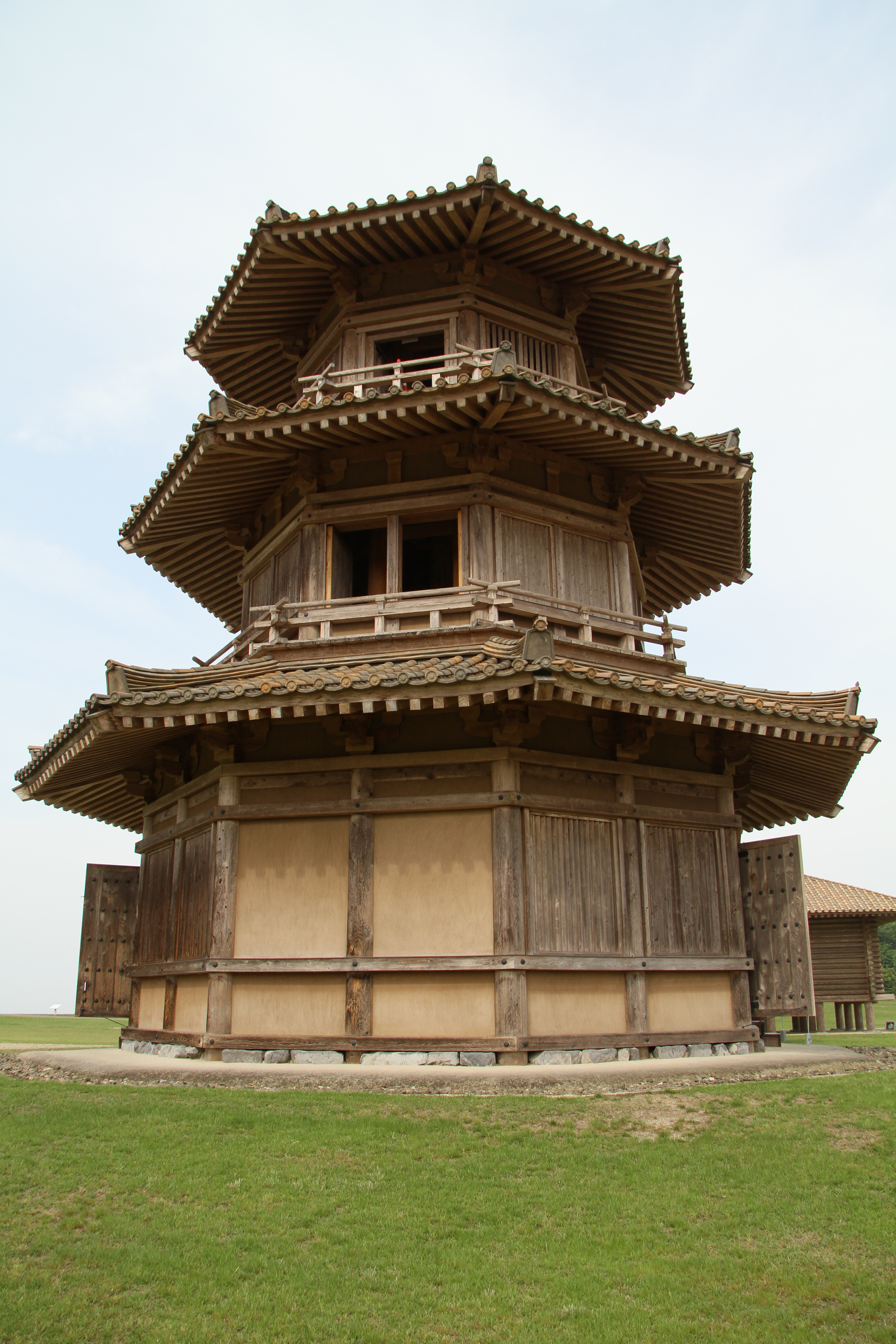
Octagonal drum tower

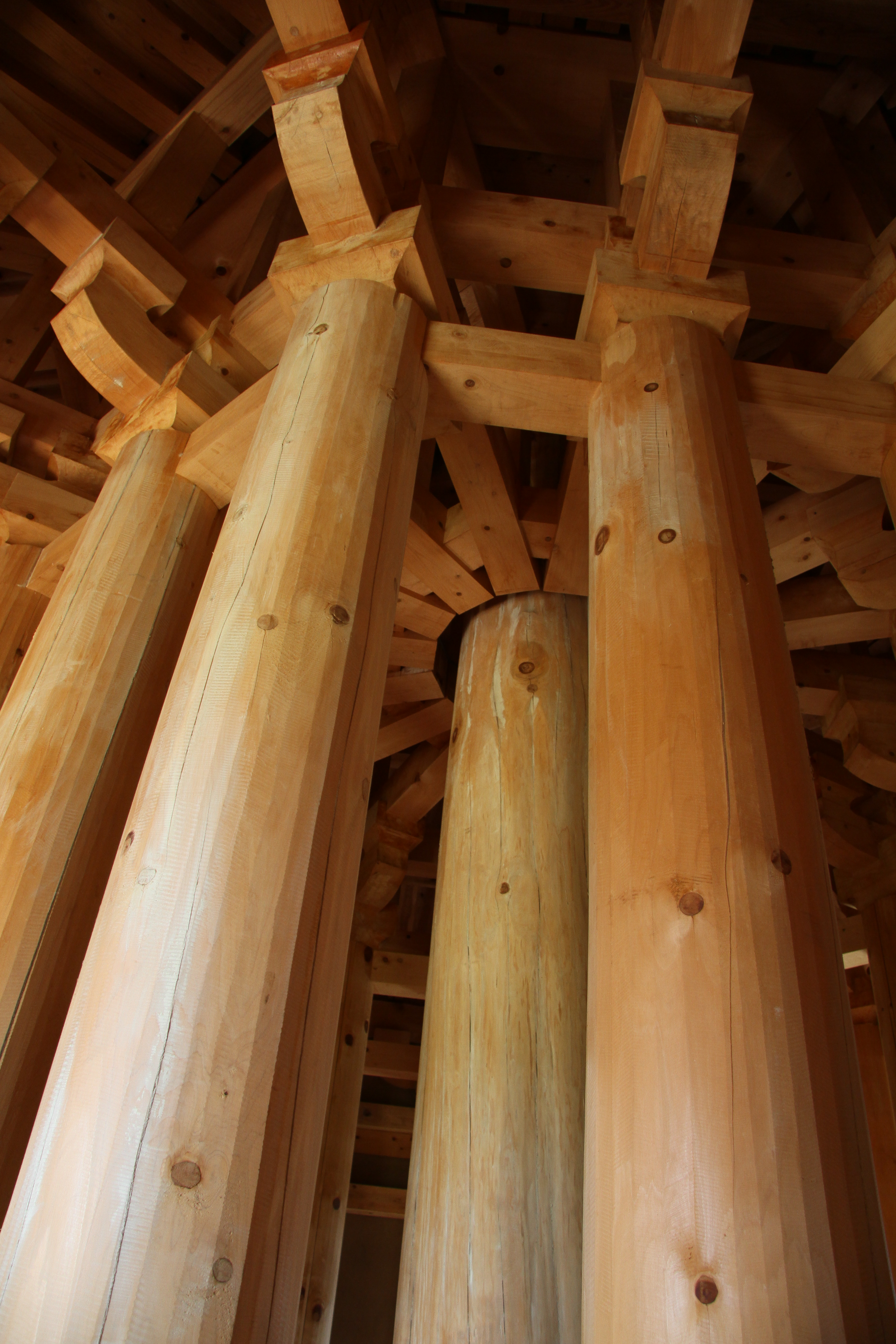
inside the octagonal tower

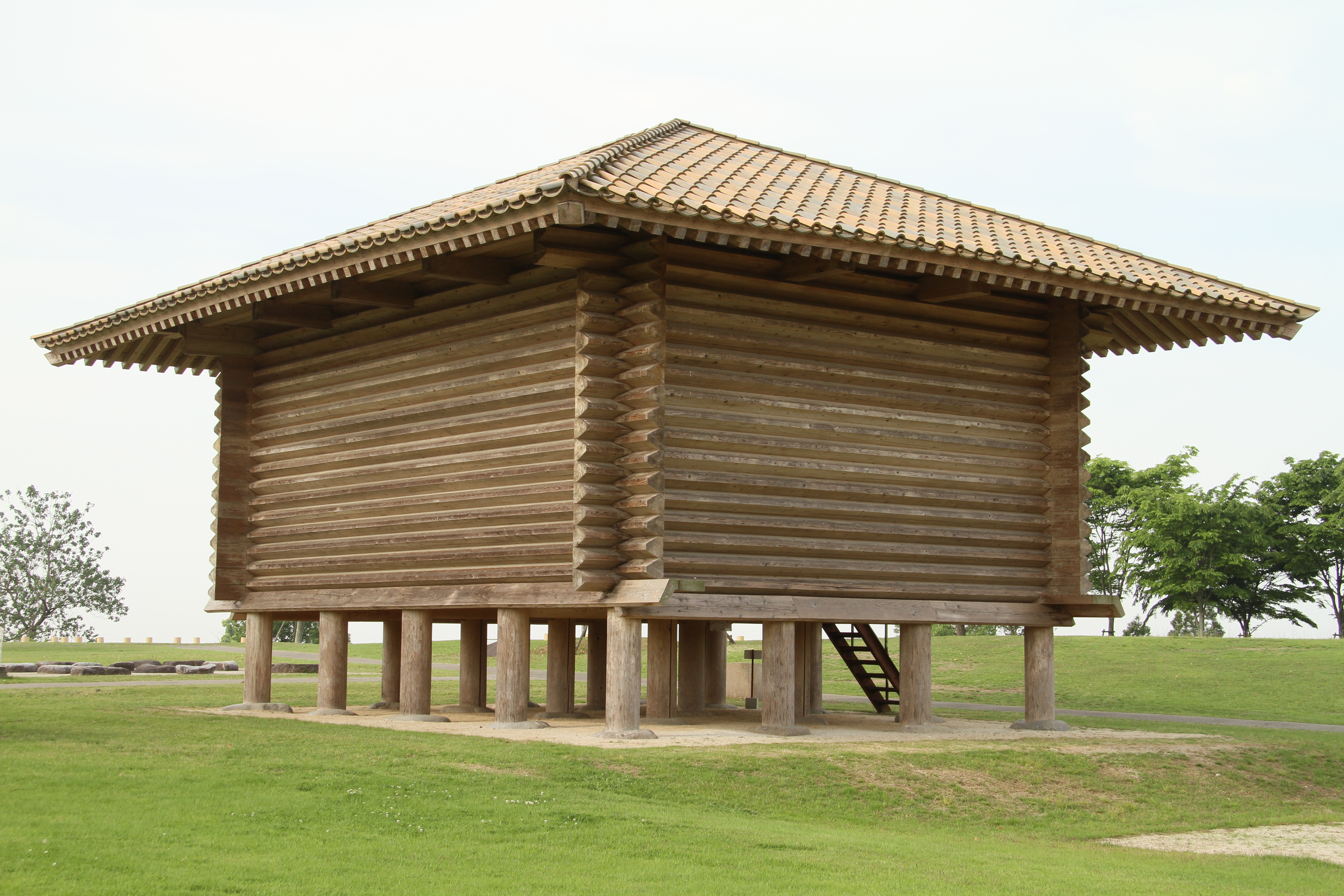
Rice granery

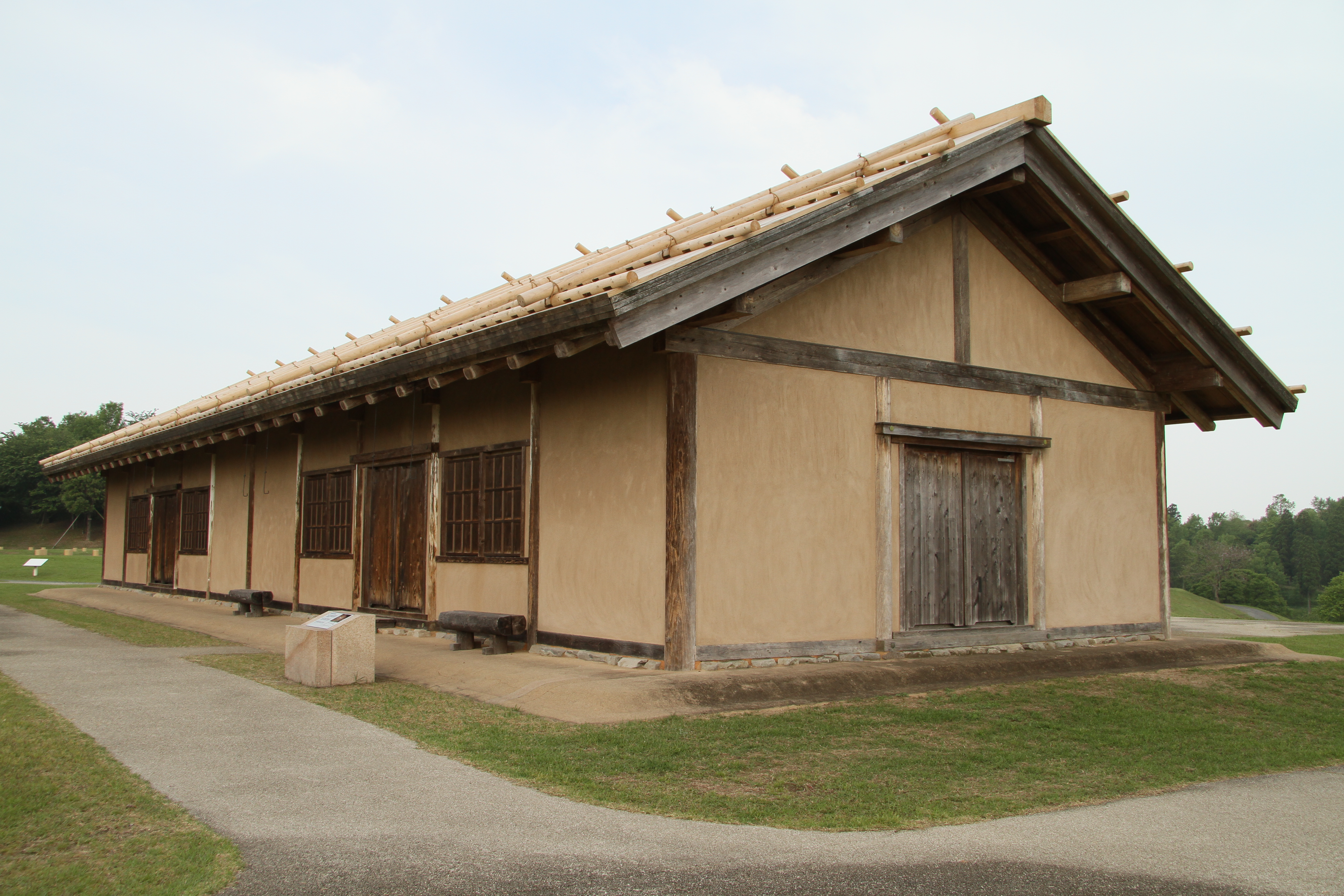
Barracks

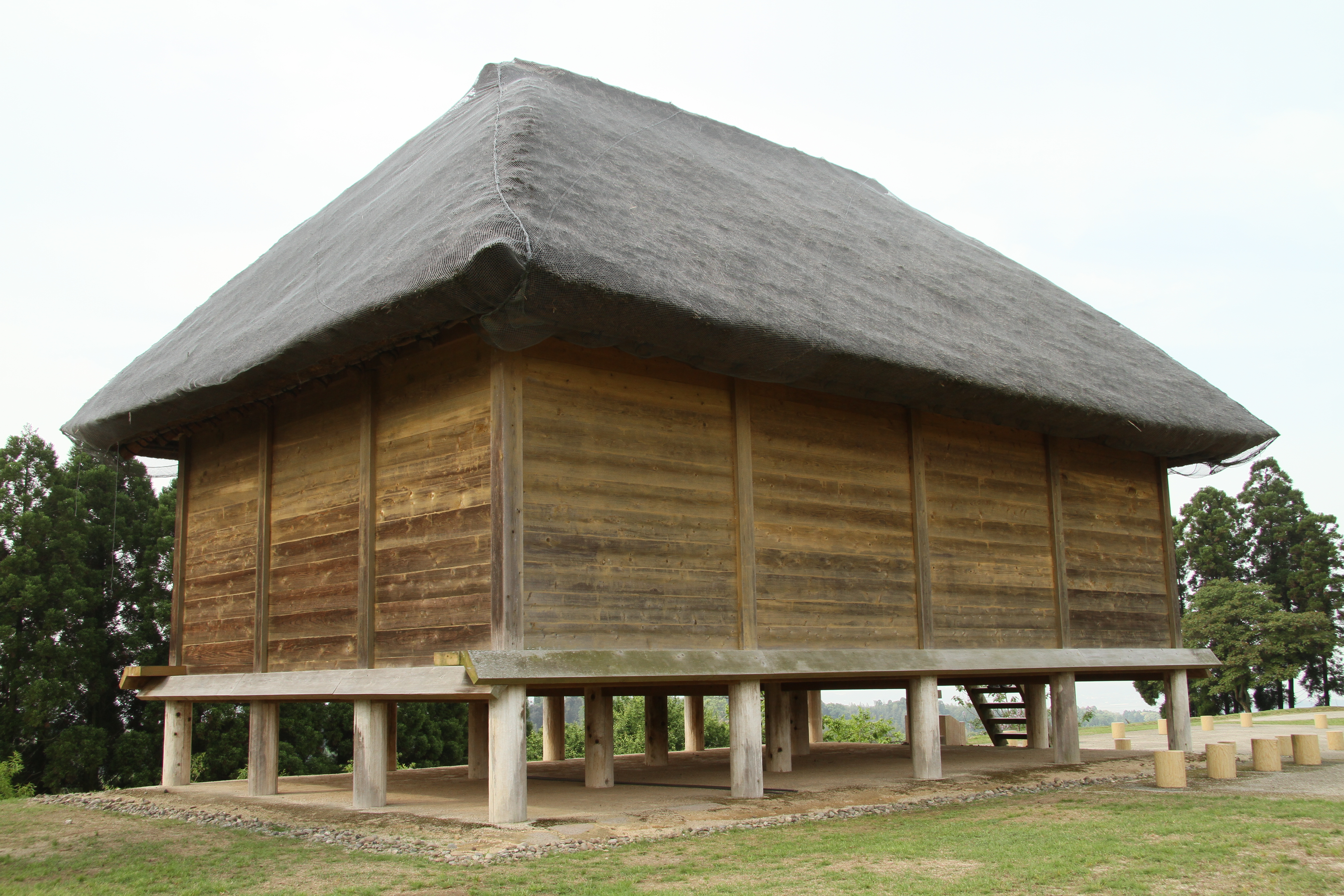
Storehouse

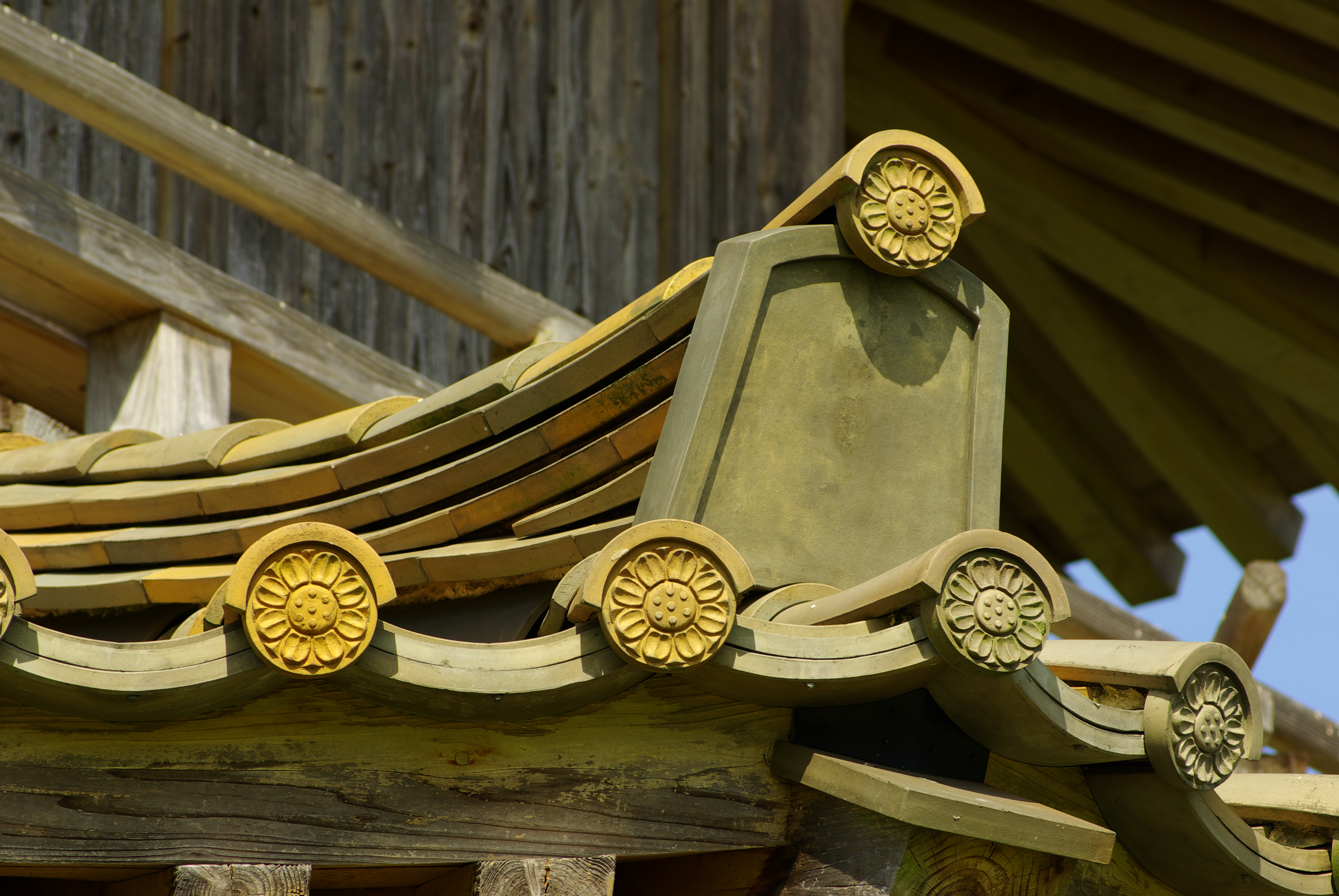
restorations of roof tiles

== See also ==
- List of Historic Sites of Japan (Kumamoto)
- List of foreign-style castles in Japan
- Kōgoishi
