= Einōsan Castle =

Historical castle ruins in Japan

- 永納山城
- Saijō, Ehime Prefecture, Japan
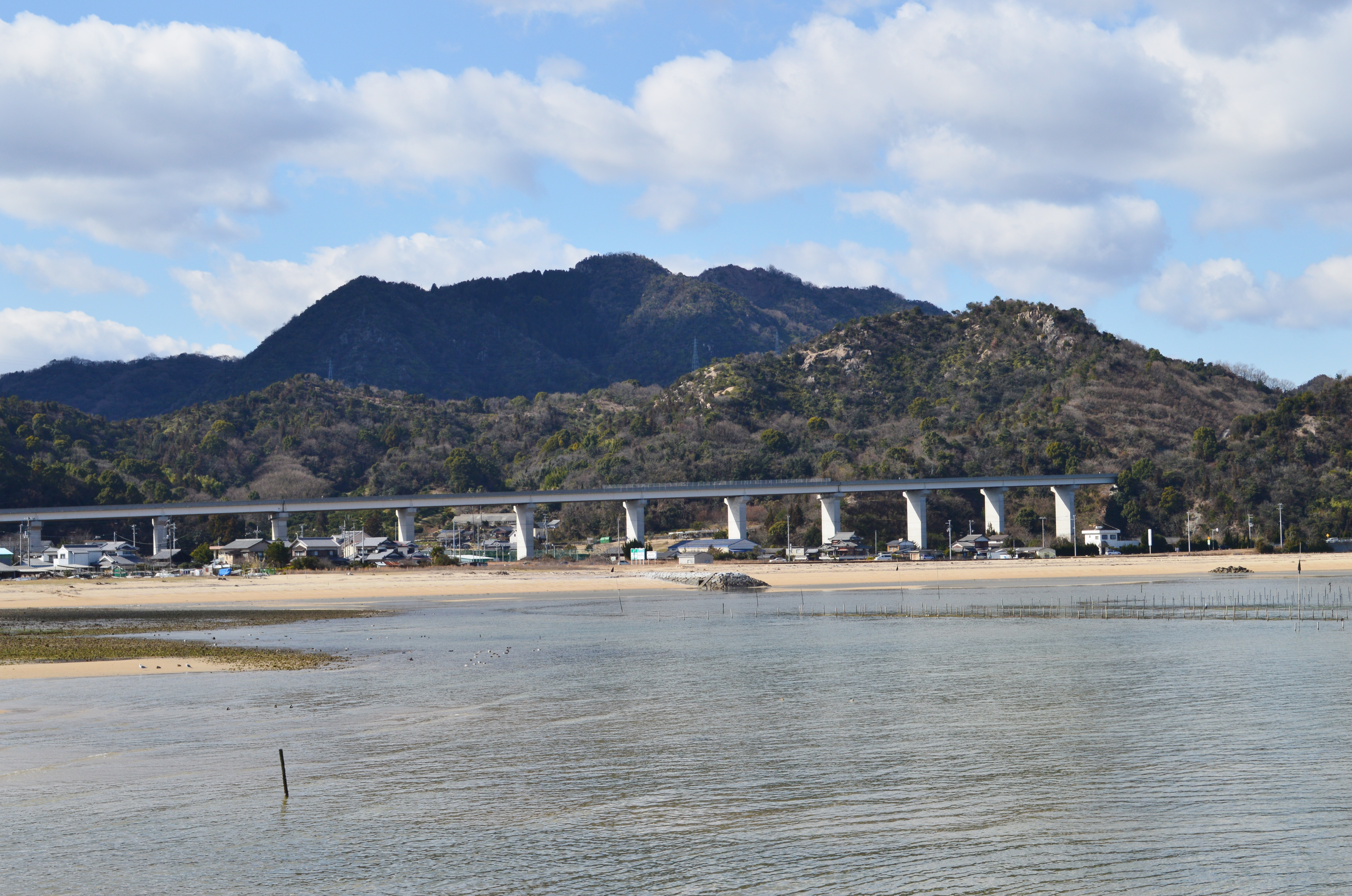
- Mount Eino

Site information
- Type: Korean-style fortresses in Japan (朝鮮式山城, Chōsen-shiki yamajiro)
- Condition: Ruins

Location
- Einōsan Castle Einōsan Castle (Japan)
- Coordinates: 33°58′40.30″N 133°3′21.25″E

Site history
- Built: c.7th century
- In use: Asuka - Nara period
- National Historic Site of Japan

Einōsan Castle (永納山城, Einōsan-jō) was an ancient castle (also known as a Korean-style fortresses in Japan (朝鮮式山城, Chōsen-shiki yamajiro) located in the city of Saijō, Ehime, Japan. Its ruins have been protected as a National Historic Site since 2005 with the area under protection expanded in 2007.

== History ==
After the defeat of the combined Baekje and Yamato Japan forces, at the hands of the Silla and Tang China alliance at the Battle of Hakusukinoe in 663, the Yamato court feared an invasion from either or both Tang or Silla. In response, they built a huge network of shore fortifications throughout the rest of the 600s, often with the assistance of Baekje engineers, generals and artisans. Unaware of the outbreak of the Silla-Tang War (670–676), the Japanese would continue to build fortifications until 701, after finding out that Silla was no longer friendly with Tang. The Einōsan Castle is one such fortification, and was situated at the eastern base of the Takanawa Peninsula, facing the Geiyo Islands in the Seto Inland Sea. It is also located narthex political center of ancient Iyo Province. The ruins of extend over 720 meters north-to-south, and 470 meters east-to-west, at an elevation of 130 meters above sea level. The walls measure about 2.5 kilometers in circumference. The site overlooks the Kurushima Straits on two independent mountain massifs, Einōsan and neighboring 132-meter Iyōzan.

It was discovered in a survey in 1977, and as a result of archaeological excavations surveys starting in 2002, granite cut stone rows and earthworks were confirmed on the massif. Artifacts related to blacksmithing have been found in the castle area, but details of castle gates, and internal layouts remain unknown, and the castle is not mentioned in any contemporary historical accounts. Judging from its structure and other similar examples, it is estimated that this fortification was built around the latter half of the 7th century, and from fragments of pottery from the early 8th century the castle is believed to have been in use until at least until that time.

The site is about 10 minutes by car from Iyo-Miyoshi Station on the JR Shikoku Yosan Line.

== Gallery ==
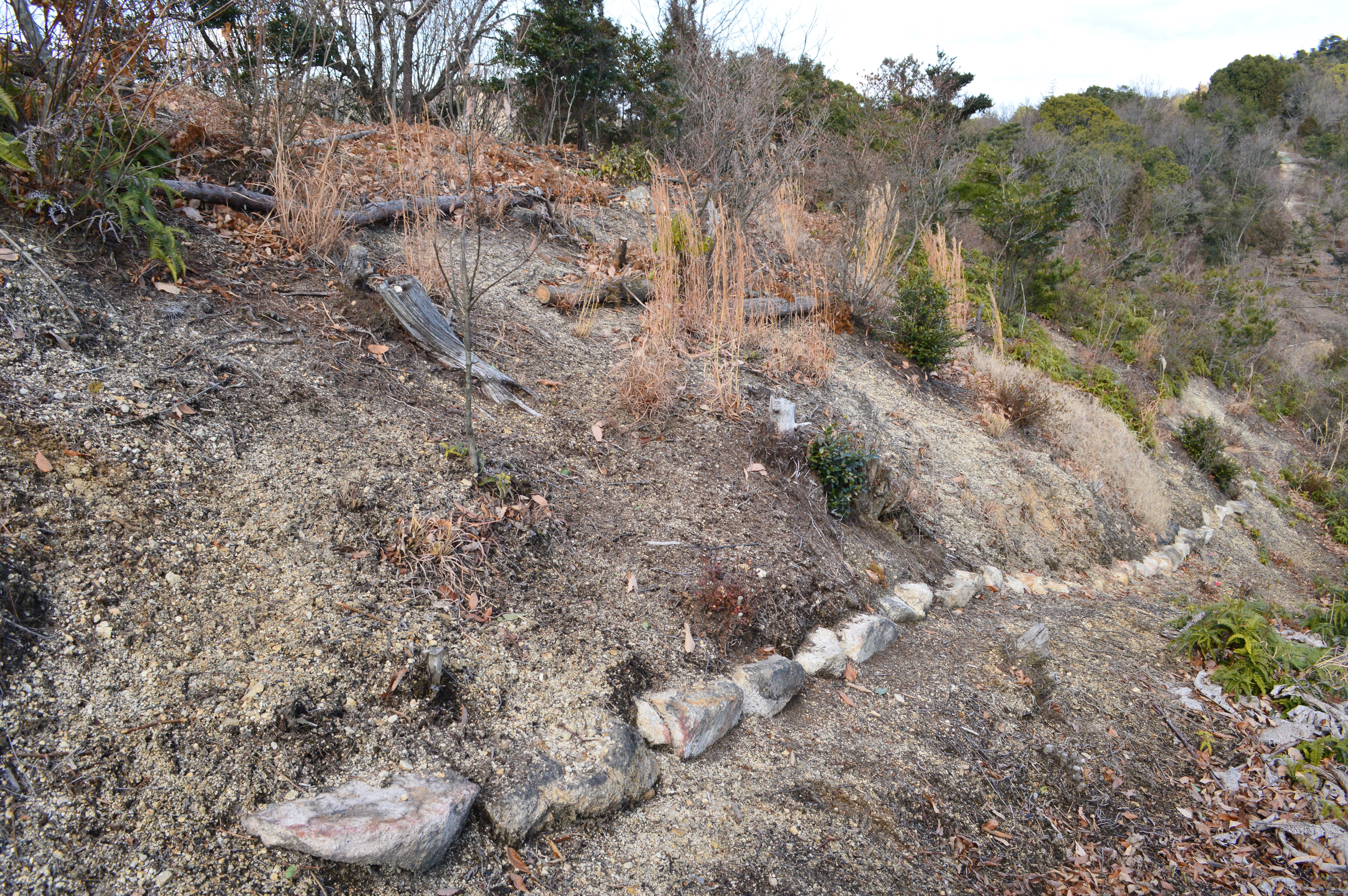
near the top of the southeast

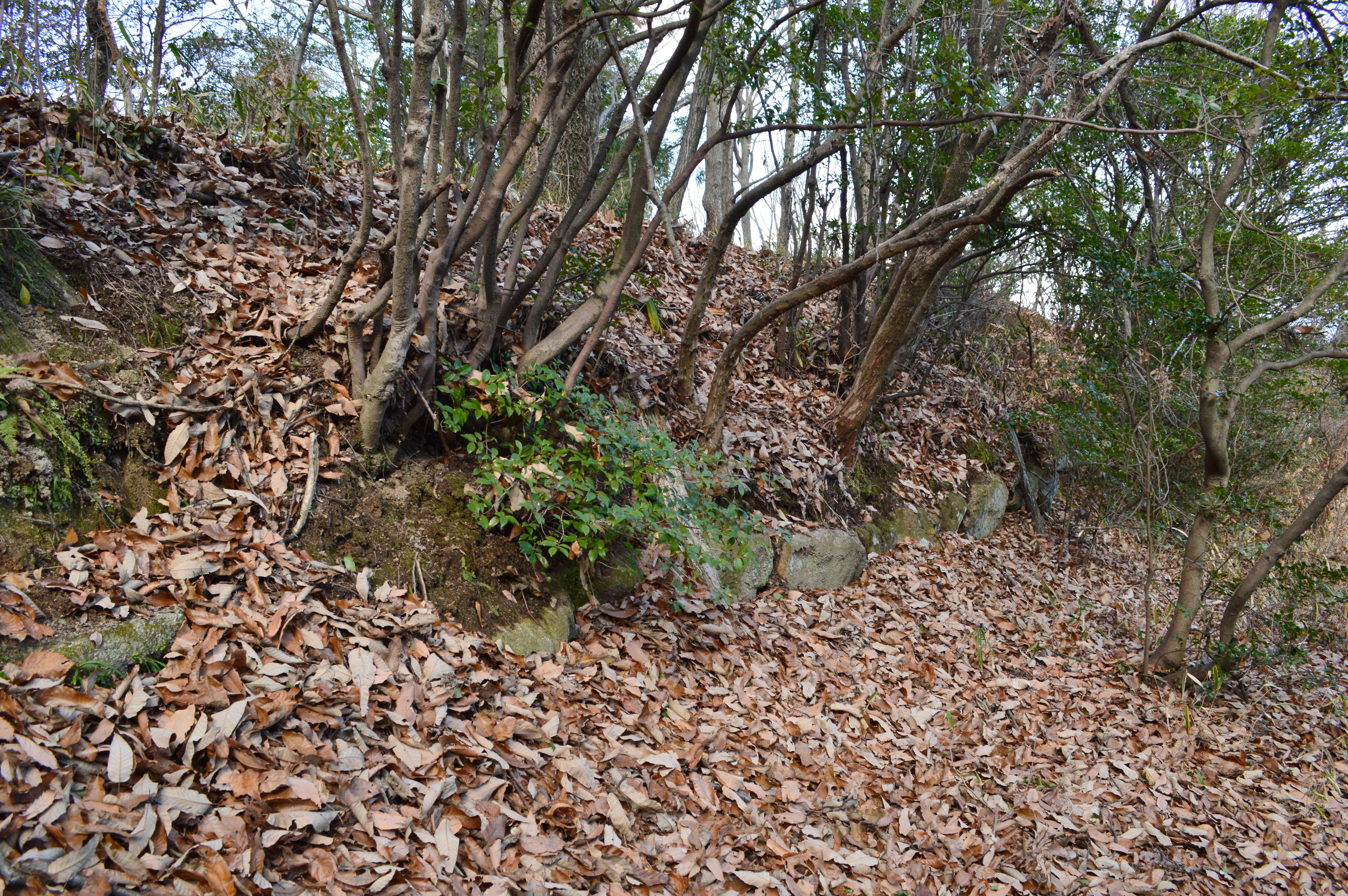
north of the summit

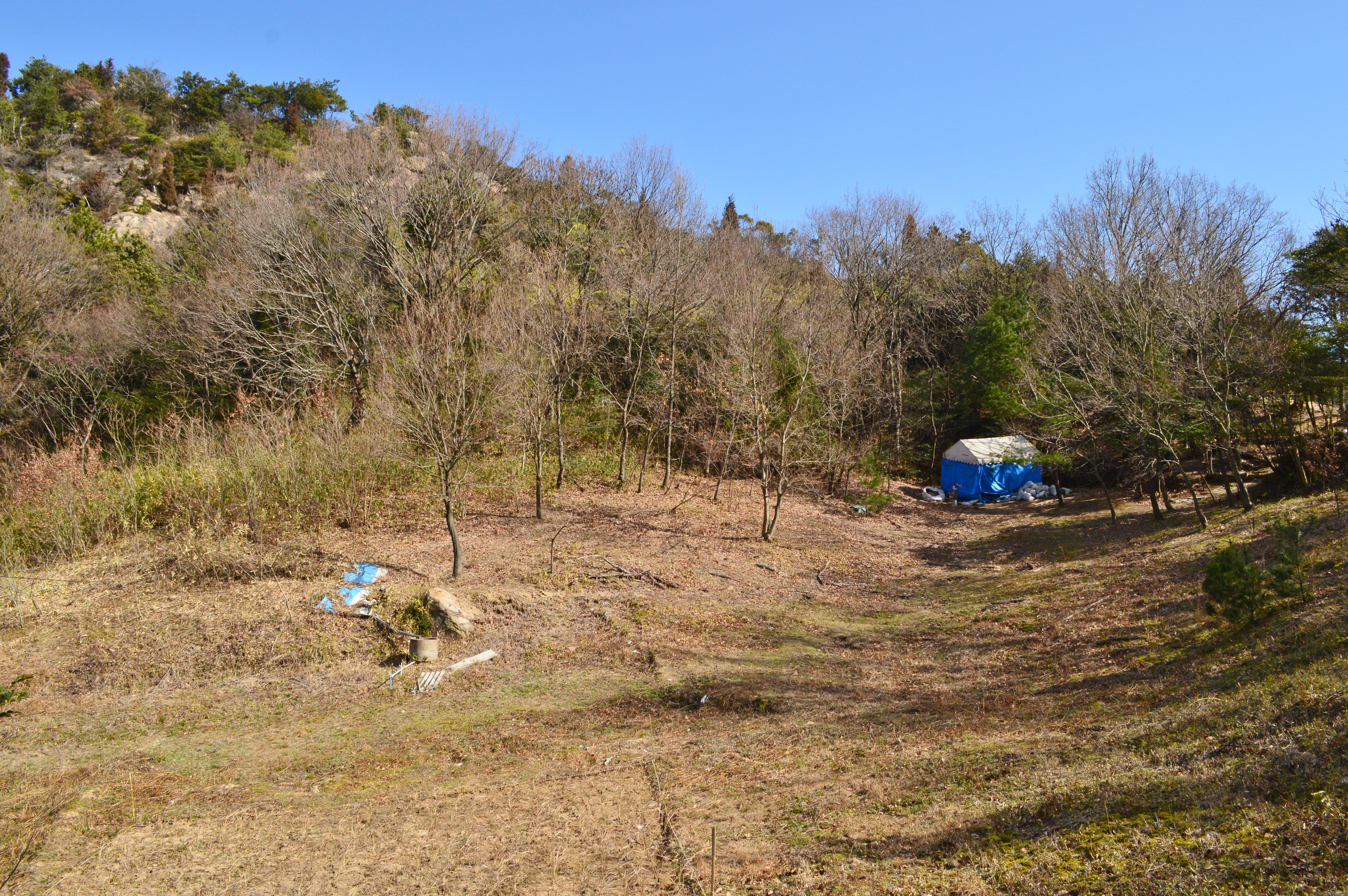
Blacksmith-related ruins

== See also ==
- List of Historic Sites of Japan (Ehime)
- List of foreign-style castles in Japan
- Kōgoishi

== Literature ==
- De Lange, William (2021). An Encyclopedia of Japanese Castles. Groningen: Toyo Press. pp. 600 pages. ISBN 978-9492722300.
- Motoo, Hinago (1986). Japanese Castles. Tokyo: Kodansha. pp. 200 pages. ISBN 0-87011-766-1.
