= Mizuki Castle =

Castle ruins in Ōnojō, Fukuoka, Japan

- 水城跡
- Ōnojō, Fukuoka, Japan
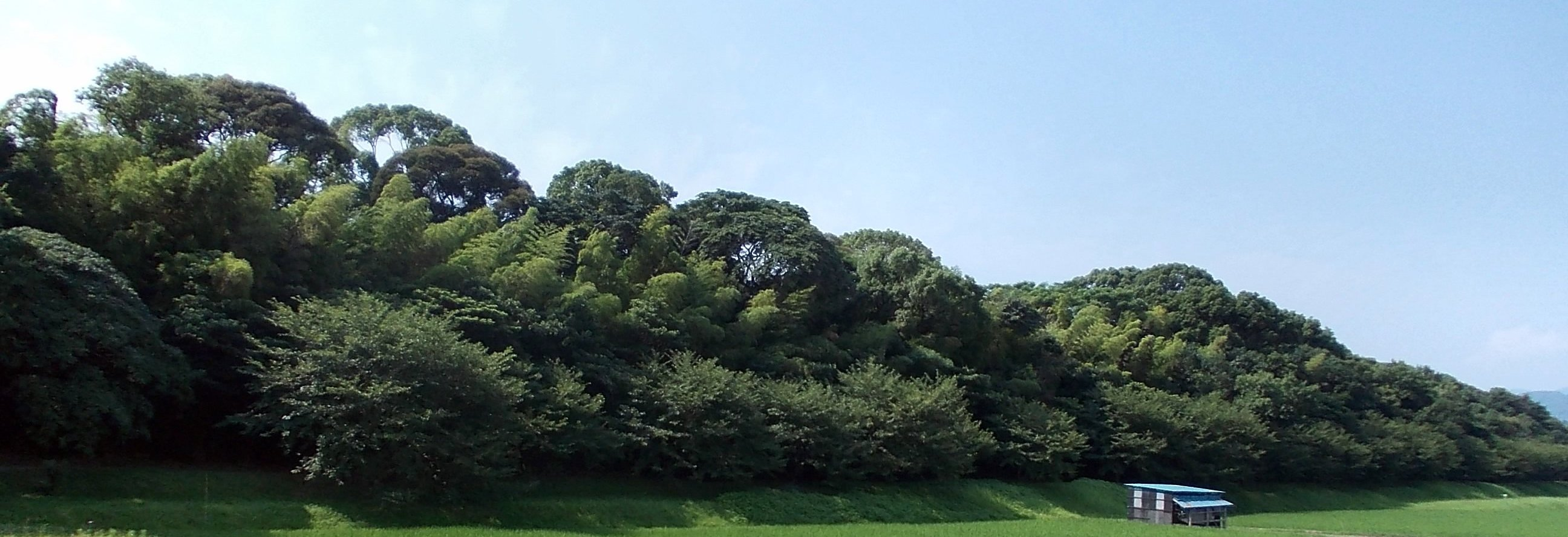
- Mizuki Castle ruins

Site information
- Type: Korean-style fortress
- Condition: Ruins

Site history
- Built: c.660s
- Built by: Yamato court
- In use: Asuka period
- Mizuki Castle (Fukuoka Prefecture) Mizuki Castle (Japan) National Historic Site of Japan

Mizuki Castle (水城跡, Mizuki-jō ato) was an ancient castle (also known as a Korean-style fortresses in Japan (朝鮮式山城, Chōsen-shiki yamajiro) straddling the border of the cities of Ōnojō, Dazaifu, and Kasuga, Fukuoka Prefecture Japan. Its ruins have been protected as a National Historic Site since 1921, and raised to a Special National Historic Site since 1953 with the area under protection expanded in 2013.

== History ==
After the defeat of the combined Baekje and Yamato Japan forces at the hands of the Silla and Tang China alliance at the Battle of Hakusukinoe in 663, the Yamato court feared they would invade Japan. In response, a huge network of shore fortifications was constructed throughout the rest of the 600s, often with the assistance of Baekje engineers, generals and artisans. Initially unaware of the outbreak of the Silla-Tang War (670–676), the Japanese would continue to build fortifications (the most prominent of which are the kōgoishi) until 701. Construction of Mizuki Castle began in 664 by order of Emperor Tenchi, although in the Nihon Shoki it is described only as "a large embankment in Tsukushi Province to store water".

Mizuki Castle was built to close the narrowest constriction between Ōno Castle and the Ushikubi Plateau to the west. It is a two-tiered earthwork with a total length of approximately 1.2 kilometers, a height of nine meters, a width of approximately 80 meters at the base, and a width of approximately 25 meters at the top, with east and west gates on both ends. The eastern gate was reserved for welcoming high-ranking officials sent from the Imperial Court, while the western gate was for foreign envoys, merchants and departing Japanese envoys. The wooden gutter across the base of the earthwork is 79.5 meters long, 1.2 meters wide, and 0.8 meters high. On the Hakata side of the earthworks, an outer moat approximately 60 meters wide and four meters deep exists five meters below the current paddy field surface. The fortification was built on the soft ground of alluvial land with the Mikasa River flowing north through the center. It was constructed using the "shikisoda" construction method, which strengthens the foundation by mixing a large amount of branches and leaves into the lowest layer of the earthwork. Furthermore, the upper layer of the earthwork is of rammed earth, made of piled earth of different soil types, and compacted in units of about ten centimeters. The road through the castle was the main route for connecting the government center at Dazaifu and Hakata Port, until the latter half of the 8th century, and would be the route travelled by foreign emissaries.

To the west of Mizuki, there are the remains of several small-scale earthworks that form a ring of outer fortifications. These are collectively known as the Shomizuki (small Mizuki): Kamidai-Komizu Castle has an earthwork of about 80 meters in length, Odoi-Komizu Castle has an earthwork of about 100 meters in length, and Tenjinyama Komizuki Castle has an earthwork of about 80 meters in length. Also, in neighboring Kiyama, are the Sekiya earthwork ruins and the Toregi earthwork ruins.

Archaeological excavations of the site include an investigation of the cross section of the earthworks in 1913, and the wood gutter in 1930, but a full-scale excavation only began from 1970, and is still ongoing. In 1975 the outer moat on the Hakata side of the fortification was discovered, and in 1978, Haji ware pottery with ink writing and the inscription "Mizuki" dating from the late 8th century was unearthed. From 2013 to 2014, the Fukuoka Prefectural Board of Education conducted a resurvey of the earthwork cross section. Mizuki Castle was listed as one of the Continued Top 100 Japanese Castles in 2017.

== Gallery ==
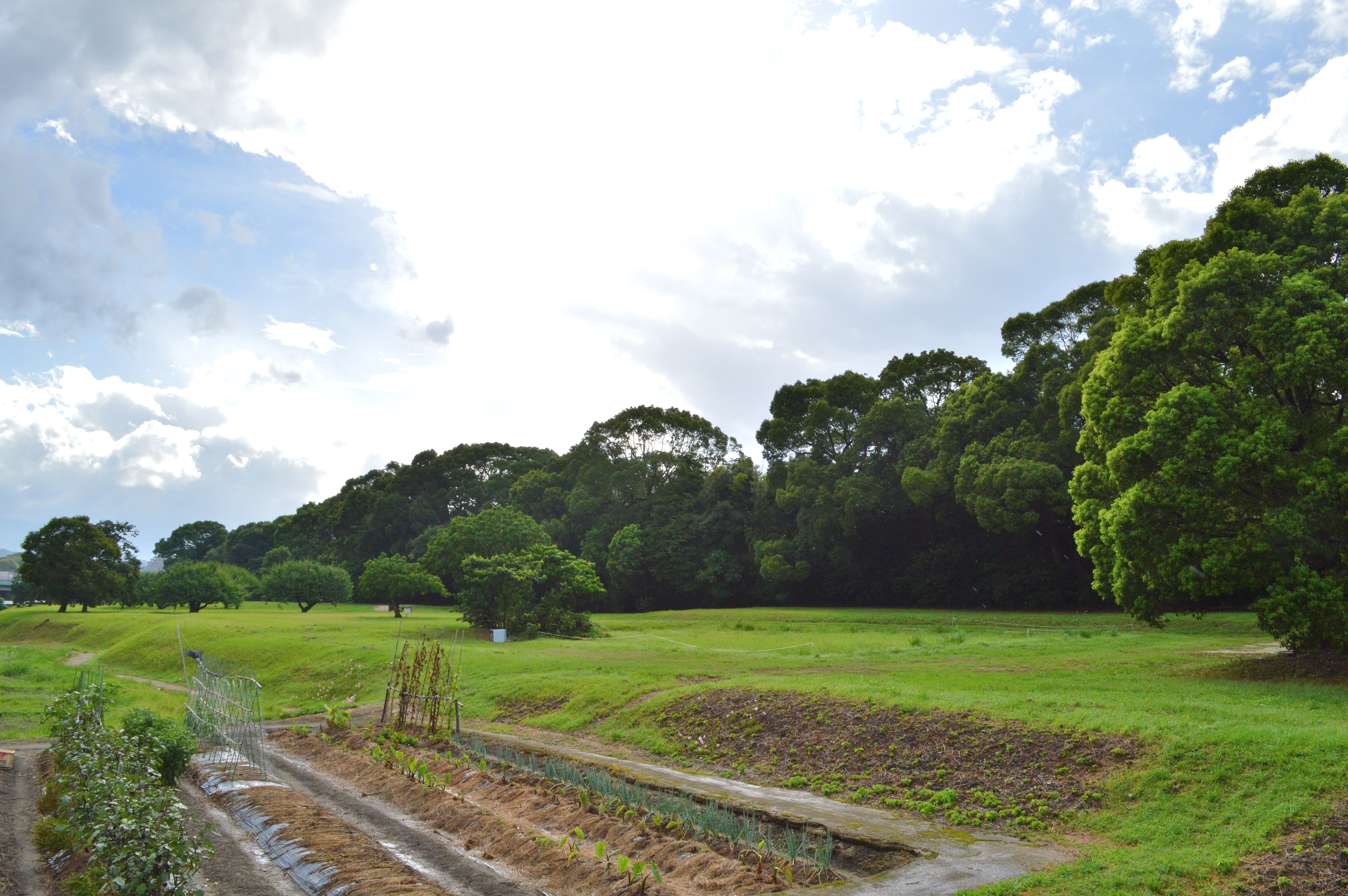
Panoramic view（from southeast）

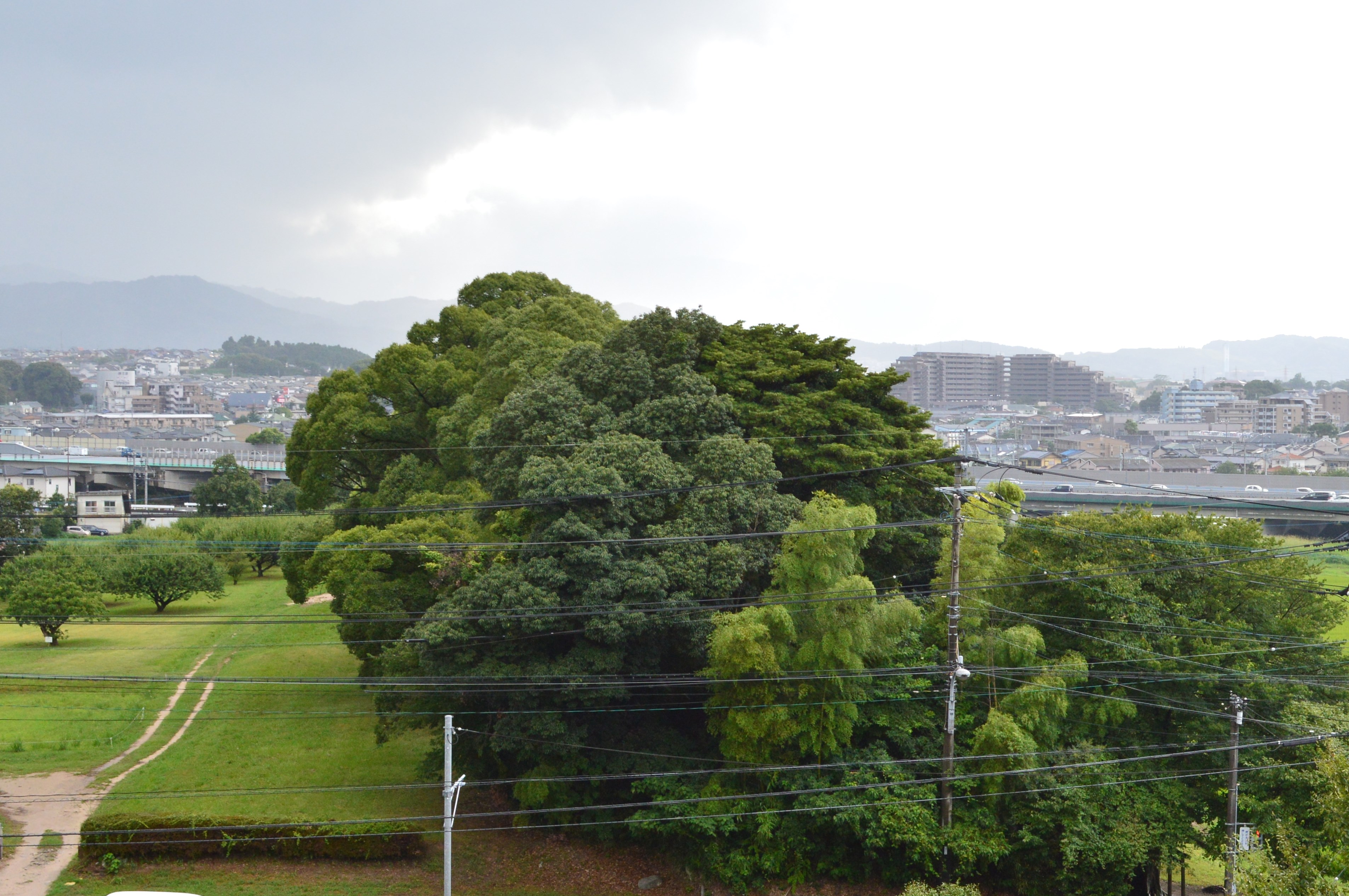
Front View（east east）

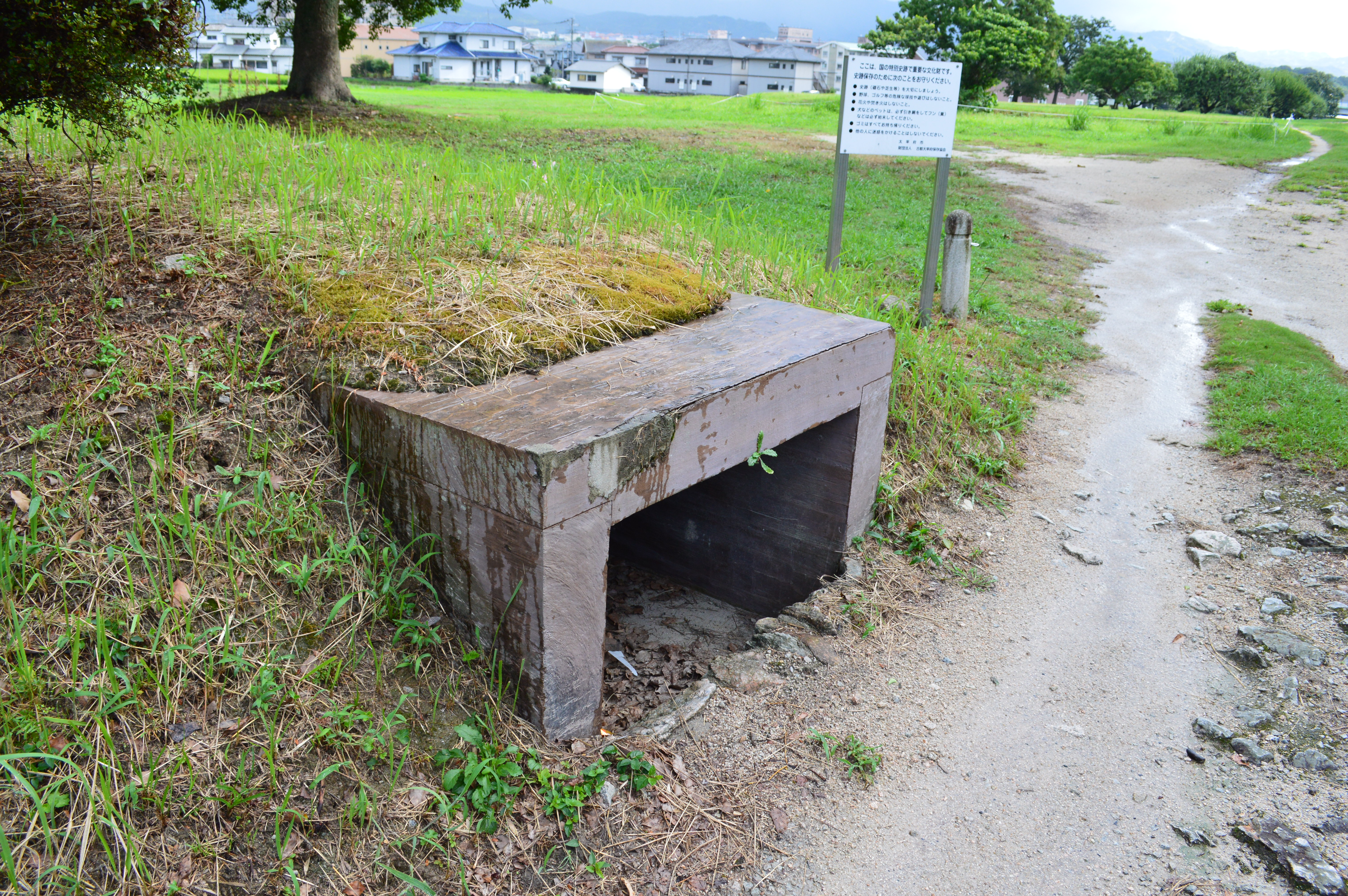
wooden gutter（reconstruction）

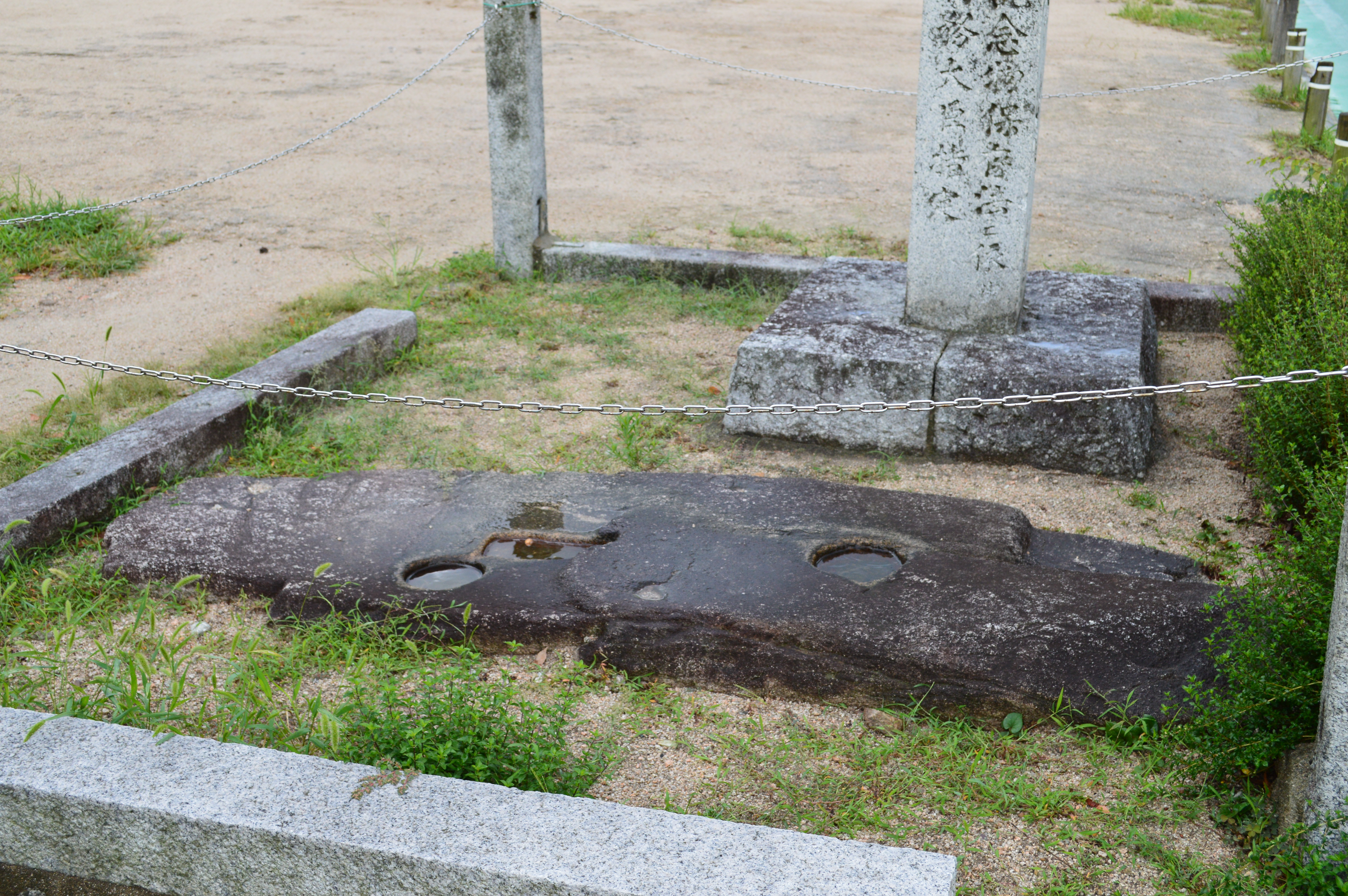
foundations of East Gate

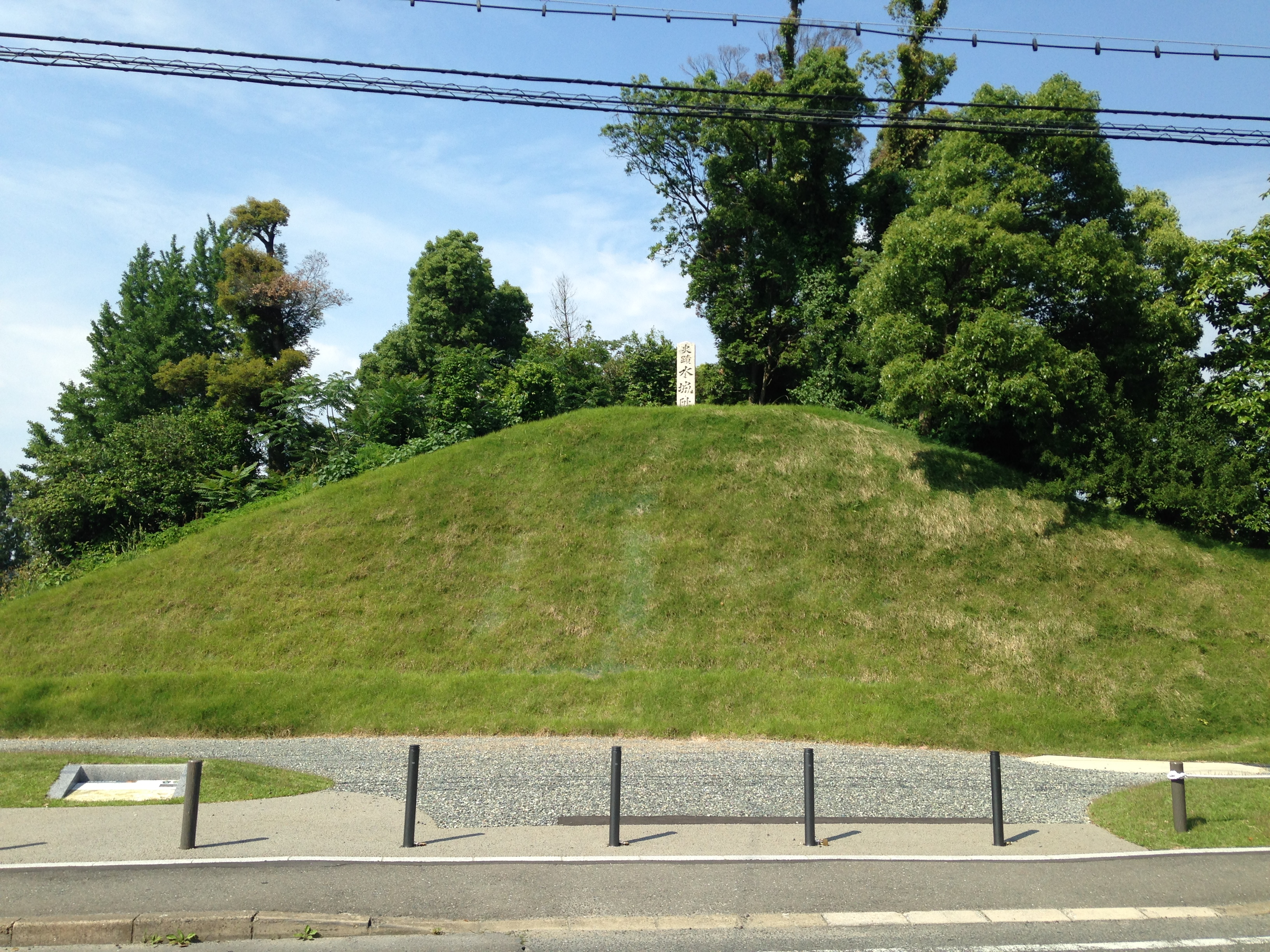
Cross-section of earthwork

The present site has a motorway running through it. There is nothing left of the Daifaru regional headquarters, except for an empty field. On site is a small museum, with information in English and Japanese. There is a model of Mizuki Castle in the nearby Kyushu National Museum.

The site is approximately a 25-minute walk from Tofurōmae Station on the Nishitetsu Tenjin Ōmuta Line.

== See also ==
- List of Historic Sites of Japan (Fukuoka)
- List of foreign-style castles in Japan
- Kōgoishi

== Literature ==
- De Lange, William (2021). An Encyclopedia of Japanese Castles. Groningen: Toyo Press. pp. 600 pages. ISBN 978-9492722300.
