= List of foreign-style castles in Japan =

This is a list of foreign-style castles in Japan. In Japan, the word '城(shiro) has broader meanings than western world, so this list includes the buildings near to fortresses.

== Korean style castles ==
Castle	Image	Location	First Built	Type	Status
Mizuki Castle		Dazaifu, Fukuoka Prefecture	663	Korean style defensive wall?	Ruins
Nagato Castle		Shimonoseki, Yamaguchi Prefecture?	665	Korean-style fortress	unknown location
Ōno Castle		Ōnojō, Fukuoka Prefecture	665	Korean-style fortress	Ruins
Kii Castle		Kiyama, Saga Prefecture	665	Korean-style fortress	Ruins
Takayasu Castle		Heguri, Nara Prefecture	667	Korean-style fortress	Ruins
Yashima Castle		Takamatsu, Kagawa Prefecture	667	Korean-style fortress	Ruins, restored stonewall
Kaneda Castle		Tsushima, Nagasaki Prefecture	667	Korean-style fortress	Ruins
Kikuchi Castle		Yamaga, Kumamoto Prefecture	698	Korean-style fortress	Partially reconstructed
Mino Castle		unknown	699	Korean-style fortress	unknown location
Inazumi castle		unknown	699	Korean-style fortress	unknown location
Mio Castle		Takashima, Shiga Prefecture?	672	Korean-style fortress?	unknown location
Ibara Castle		Fukuyama, Hiroshima Prefecture?	719	Korean-style fortress	unknown location
Tsune Castle		Fuchū, Hiroshima Prefecture?	719	Korean-style fortress	unknown location
Kiyama Castle		Tatsuno, Hyogo, Hyogo Prefecture	unknown	Kōgoishi	Ruins
Ōmeguri Komeguri-san Castle		Okayama, Okayama Prefecture	unknown	Kōgoishi	Ruins
Ki Castle		Sōja, Okayama Prefecture	unknown	Kōgoishi	Partially reconstructed
Iwaki-san Castle		Hikari, Yamaguchi prefecture	unknown	Kōgoishi	Ruins
Kiyama Castle		Sakaide, Kagawa prefecture	unknown	Kōgoishi	Ruins
Einōsan Castle		Saijō, Ehime Prefecture	unknown	Kōgoishi	Ruins
Kakenouma Castle		Iizuka, Fukuoka Prefecture	unknown	Kōgoishi	Ruins
Raizan Castle		Itoshima, Fukuoka, Fukuoka Prefecture	unknown	Kōgoishi	Ruins
Hagi Castle		Asakura, Fukuoka Prefecture	unknown	Kōgoishi	Ruins
Ashiki-san Castle		Chikushino, Fukuoka Prefecture	unknown	Kōgoishi	Ruins
Kōra-san Castle		Kurume, Fukuoka Prefecture	unknown	Kōgoishi	Ruins
Zoyama Castle		Miyama, Fukuoka Prefecture	unknown	Kōgoishi	Ruins
Goshogatani castle		Miyako, Fukuoka Prefecture	unknown	Kōgoishi	Ruins
Tōbaru-san Castle		Kōge, Fukuoka prefecture	unknown	Kōgoishi	Ruins
Obukuma-yama Castle		Saga, Saga prefecture	unknown	Kōgoishi	Ruins
Otsubo-yama Castle		Takeo, Saga, Saga Prefecture	unknown	Kōgoishi	Ruins

== Chinese style castle ==
Castle	Image	Location	First Built	Type	Status
Ito Castle		Itoshima, Fukuoka Prefecture	756–768	Chinese style fortress	Ruins

== Portuguese style castle ==
Castle	Location	First Built	Type	Status
Fortified City of Nagasaki	Nagasaki, Nagasaki Prefecture	1580?	Citadel	Possible ruins remains

== Western style bastion fort ==
Castle	Image	Location	First Built	Type	Status
Goryōkaku		Hakodate, Hokkaido	1866	19th century western military style star fort	Reconstructed
Tatsuoka Castle		Saku, Nagano Prefecture	1864–1867	19th century western military style star fort	One Building remains
Hekirichi Bastion Fort of Matsumae Clan		Hokuto, Hokkaido	1855	A defensive structure combining tactical theory adapted to the peak of artillery warfare with the star-shaped bastion style, developed 150 years after Vauban’s geometric refinements. The foundational theory is a Dutch translation of teachings from a professor at the Saint-Cyr Military Academy.	The outer fortifications and battery structures (earthworks)remain well
Shiryōkaku		Hakodate, Hokkaido	1869	19th century western military style bastion fort	Ruins
Togeshita daiba		Nanae, Hokkaido	?	Seven horned Star-shaped redoubt, however, none of its extremities feature bastions.	Ruins

== Japanese castles with French-style buildings ==
Castle	Image	Location	First Built	Western style buildings installed	Remaining French-style building
Shibata Castle		Shibata, Niigata Prefecture	Kamakura period	Meiji period	barracks
Nagoya Castle		Nagoya, Aichi Prefecture	Sengoku period	Meiji period	barracks (relocated to Meiji-mura)
Matsuyama Castle		Matsuyama, Ehime Prefecture	1603	1922	villa

== Japanese castles with English-style buildings ==
Castle	Image	Location	First Built	Western style buildings installed	Remaining English style buildings
Osaka Castle		Osaka, Osaka Prefecture	1583	Meiji period	Headquarters of the 4th Division of the Imperial Japanese Army (now Miraiza Osaka-jo)

== See also ==
- Chashi—fortifications built by Ainu people
- Gusuku—the castles of the Ryūkyū Kingdom
- List of castles
- List of castles in Japan
