= Kaneda Castle =

Castle ruins in Tsushima, Japan

- 金田城
- Tsushima, Nagasaki, Japan
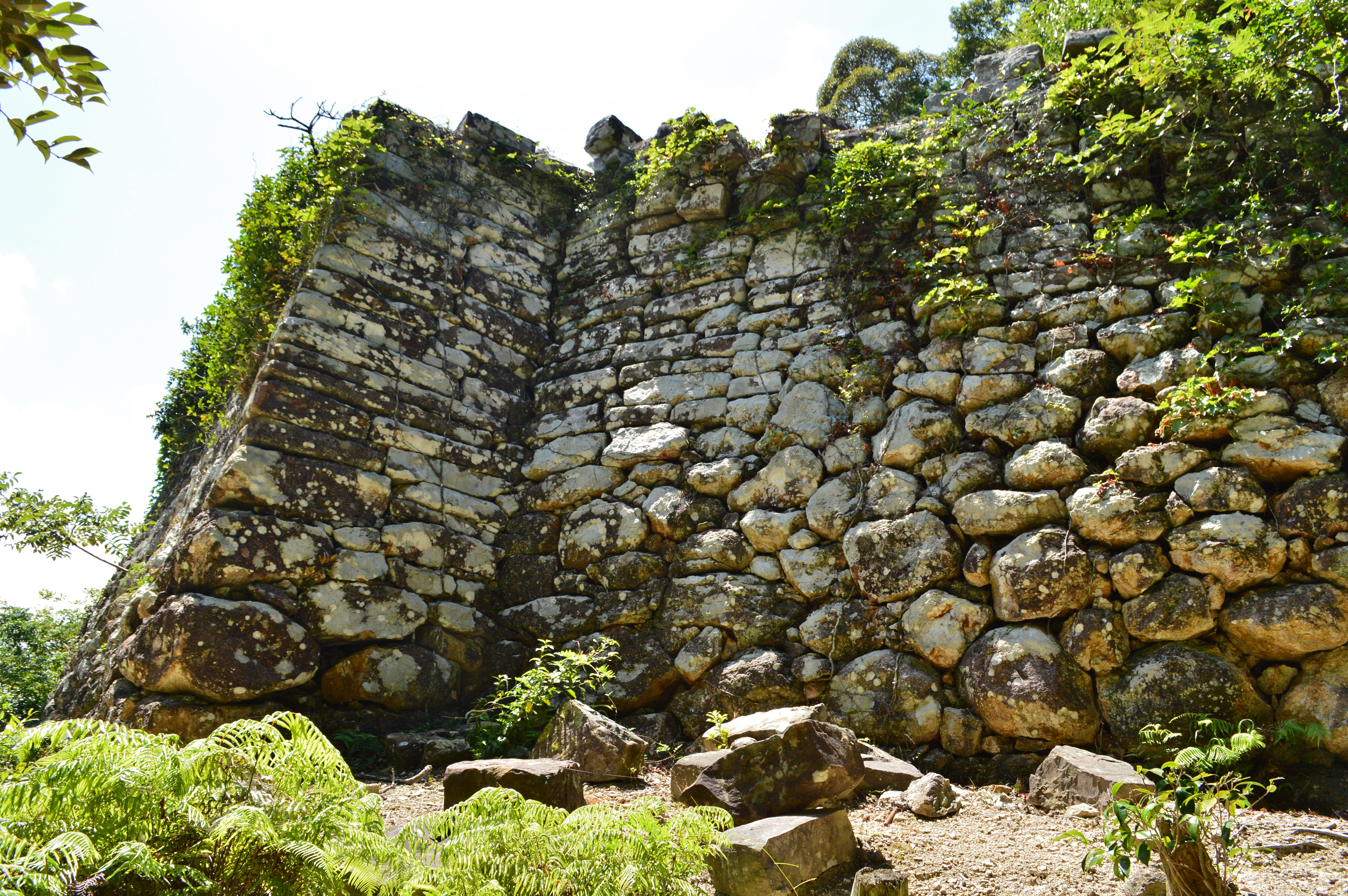
- Stone wall of Kaneda Castle ruins

Site information
- Type: Korean-style fortress
- Controlled by: Yamato court
- Condition: Ruins

Location
- Coordinates: 34.3007°N 129.2736°E

Site history
- Built: 667
- Built by: Yamato court
- In use: Unknown

Kaneda Castle (金田城, Kaneda-jō) was a Korean-style fortress located in Tsushima, Nagasaki prefecture. Kaneda castle has been designated as being of national special significance.

== History ==
Kaneda Castle was likely built by Yamato court. Following the defeat of the allied Yamato Japan and Korean Baekje in the 663 battle of Baekgang ( also known as the Battle of Hakusukinoe) by an alliance of Tang China and the Korean Silla, the fortress was constructed to withstand a potential invasion. This alliance between Korean Baekje and Yamato Japan, helps explain the Korean-style fortress or Chōsen-shiki yamajiro construction.

The castle was listed as one of the Continued Top 100 Japanese Castles in 2017.

== Shrine ==
It contains a shrine in it which is a Kokushi genzaisha

== See also ==
- List of Historic Sites of Japan (Nagasaki)
- List of foreign-style castles in Japan

== Literature ==
- De Lange, William (2021). An Encyclopedia of Japanese Castles. Groningen: Toyo Press. pp. 600 pages. ISBN 978-9492722300.
