= Shiryōkaku =

Fort in Hakodate, Japan

Coordinates: 41°49′32.5″N 140°46′14.5″E

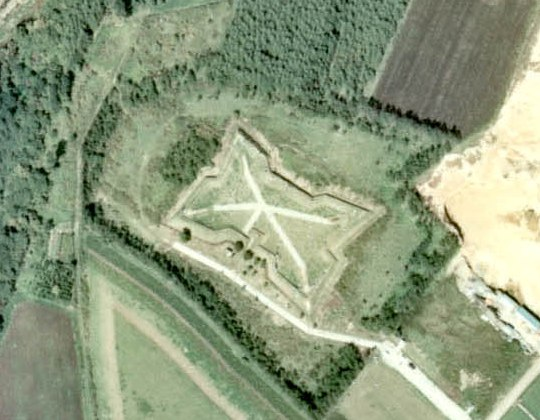
Aerial photograph of Shiryōkaku, courtesy of National Land Image Information (Color Aerial Photographs), Ministry of Land, Infrastructure, Transport and Tourism

Shiryōkaku (四稜郭) (literally, "four-point fort") is a fort in the city of Hakodate in southern Hokkaidō, Japan. It was constructed in April 1869, during the Battle of Hakodate, three kilometres to the northeast of Goryōkaku by 200 soldiers of the former Tokugawa shogunate and 100 local villagers, likely under the direction of Ōtori Keisuke. Shiryōkaku has four bastions, and is sometimes known as the "butterfly fort" as opposed to the "star fort".

The designated historic site area is 21,500 m², while the fort itself covers approximately 2,300 m², stretching approximately a hundred metres east to west and seventy metres north to south; the earthworks rise to a height of 3 m with a width of 5.4 m; they are surrounded by a dry moat 0.9 m deep and 2.7 m wide; the entrance is to the southwest.

Shiryōkaku fell to government forces within a few hours on 11 May 1869.

In 1934 the area was designated a Historic Site. Repairs were carried out from 1970 to 1972, and again in 1990.

== See also ==
- Ezo Republic
- Boshin War
- List of Historic Sites of Japan (Hokkaidō)
- List of foreign-style castles in Japan
