= Korean-style fortresses in Japan =

Fortresses built in the Yamato period (8th century and earlier)

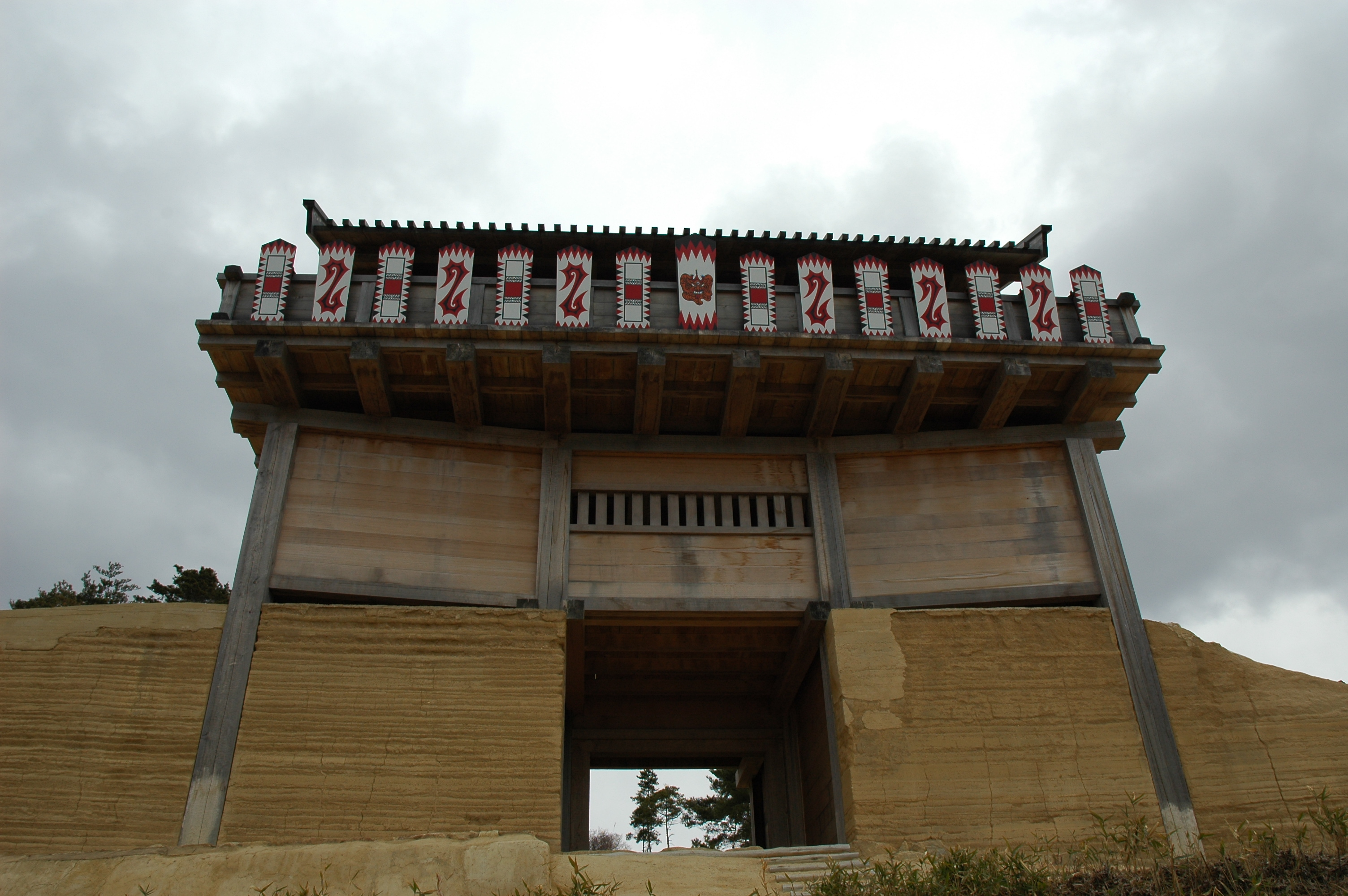
The Nishimon (Western Gate) of Kino Castle, reconstructed in 2004 to approximate the Korean-like style it may have had originally.

Over the course of the Yamato period, in the early centuries of the establishment of a Japanese state, a great number of Korean-style fortresses (朝鮮式山城, Chōsen-shiki yamajiro) were constructed in Japan. Old fortresses dating to the 8th century and earlier can be found all over western Japan. Many of these sites have been identified with fortresses whose construction, repair, and destruction are described in detail in ancient chronicles such as Nihon Shoki and Shoku Nihongi. According to some interpretations of these texts, these fortresses were built under the guidance of, and at the orders of, various members of the Korean nobility or royalty.

Comparisons of these sites have been made to other Japanese fortresses, and to sites of the same period in both Korea and China. The theory persists of direct Korean involvement in the construction of these fortresses and threat of invasion by the Korean Silla dynasty and Chinese Tang dynasty incited the Yamato court to build the Korean influenced castles. Many of the sites have been definitively dated to centuries earlier, however, and so, even if this theory holds for some sites, it does not encompass the majority.

Research on these sites is ongoing, and the questions of the purposes and origins of the fortresses, and their possible connections to Korea remain hotly debated among scholars, in part due to the nationalistic elements involved. Though some scholarship questions the identification of these fortresses with Korean origins, the Japanese term Chōsen-shiki yamajiro (朝鮮式山城, lit. "Korean-style mountain castles/fortresses") continues to be used, likely because of the high probability of Korean influence—Yamato Japan had very little need for major fortifications until that time and likely lacked such expertise, which was then likely contributed by residents of Korean descent. The term kodai yamajiro (古代山城, lit. "old period mountain castle/fortresses") is sometimes used, but its opponents argue that it can be interpreted too broadly; Chōsen-shiki yamajiro, even if not an entirely accurate description, denotes a very particular group of sites.

== Research and debate ==
Cooperative research and discussions between the two countries, over the issue of determining the origins of these fortresses began in the 1970s. Fortresses of roughly the same type are extant in Korea, but only because they have been repaired or restored, either during the Joseon period or in the 20th century, and thus arguments of their similarity to the Japanese fortresses in question are difficult to prove. On the other hand, enough of the ruins do remain that most scholars believe it obvious that these fortresses in question have far more in common with one another than with other Japanese fortresses, particularly later ones.

Much of the debate over these fortresses began in the late Meiji period (1868–1912) and early Taishō period (1912–1923), when geography and archaeology took off in Japan for the first time, and the classification of kōgoishi fortresses emerged. One key element of the debate was, and continues to be, whether these fortresses were built in the late 7th century, following Japan's defeat in the Battle of Baekgang, as defenses against a possible Silla–Tang invasion of Japan, or whether they were built earlier, possibly independently from the policies or orders of the Yamato court. During the first decades of the 20th century, a vibrant discourse was expounded regarding the time these fortresses were built, their similarities to one another and to Korean structures, the way in which they spread, and the reasons they were built. This debate continues among archaeologists today.

As it relates quite closely to the origins of Japanese culture and society, nationalistic bias on the parts of both Korean and Japanese scholars continues to have a major effect on this discourse.

== Sites ==
Name	Kanji	Romanization	Year of construction	Possible location	Current situation
Takayasu Castle	高安城	Takayasu no ki	667	Kyūan-ji, Nara Prefecture; Takayasu-yama, Osaka Prefecture	The outer walls and water gate may have been found, but the extent of the fortress' remains, records of its history, and the area it covered have not been extensively investigated.
Yashima Castle	屋嶋城	Yashima no ki	667	Takamatsu, Kagawa Prefecture	Stone walls, earthworks, water gate, remains of the lookout towers and other remains have been found, but site has not been extensively investigated. Site of the 1185 battle of Yashima.
Nagato fortress	長門城	Nagato no ki	665	Shimonoseki, Yamaguchi Prefecture	Unknown
Ōno Castle	大野城	Ōno jō	665	Dazaifu, Fukuoka Prefecture	Earthworks, stone walls, water gate, and remnants of buildings remain.
Kii Castle	基肄城	Kii jō	665	Kiyama, Saga Prefecture	Ruins remain of the castle foundations, main gates, earthworks, stone walls, and water gate.
Kaneda Castle	金田城	Kaneta no ki	667	Tsushima, Nagasaki Prefecture	Ruins remain of castle walls, main gate, water gate, and lookout towers.
Kikuchi Castle	鞠智城	Kikuchi jō	Nara–early Heian periods	Yamaga or Kikuchi, Kumamoto Prefecture	Ruins of 64 buildings or towers remain.
Ibara fortress	茨城	Ibaraki	Nara period	Fukuyama, Hiroshima Prefecture	Unknown
Tsune fortress	常城	Tsuneki	665	Fuchū or Fukuyama, Hiroshima Prefecture	Unknown
Minō castle	三野城	Minō-jō	late 7th century	Hakata-ku, Fukuoka, Fukuoka Prefecture	Unknown
Inazumi fortress	稲積城	Inazumi no ki	late 7th century	Shima, Fukuoka Prefecture	Unknown
Mio fortress	三尾城	Mio no ki		Takashima, Shiga Prefecture	Unknown
Kiyama Castle	城山城	Kiyama-jō	late 7th century	Sakaide, Kagawa Prefecture	Ruins remain of the castle foundations, stone walls
Kino Castle	鬼ノ城	Kino-jō	late 7th century	Sōja, Okayama Prefecture	Ruins of stone walls, water gate, various buildings remain. Western gate, several other buildings, reconstructed in first years of the 21st century.

== See also ==
- List of foreign-style castles in Japan

== Notes and references ==
- This article's content is derived largely from that of the corresponding article on the Japanese Wikipedia.
