= Ōno Castle (Chikuzen Province) =

Castle ruins in Ōnojō, Fukuoka, Japan

- 大野城
- Umi, Ōnojō, Dazaifu, Fukuoka, Japan
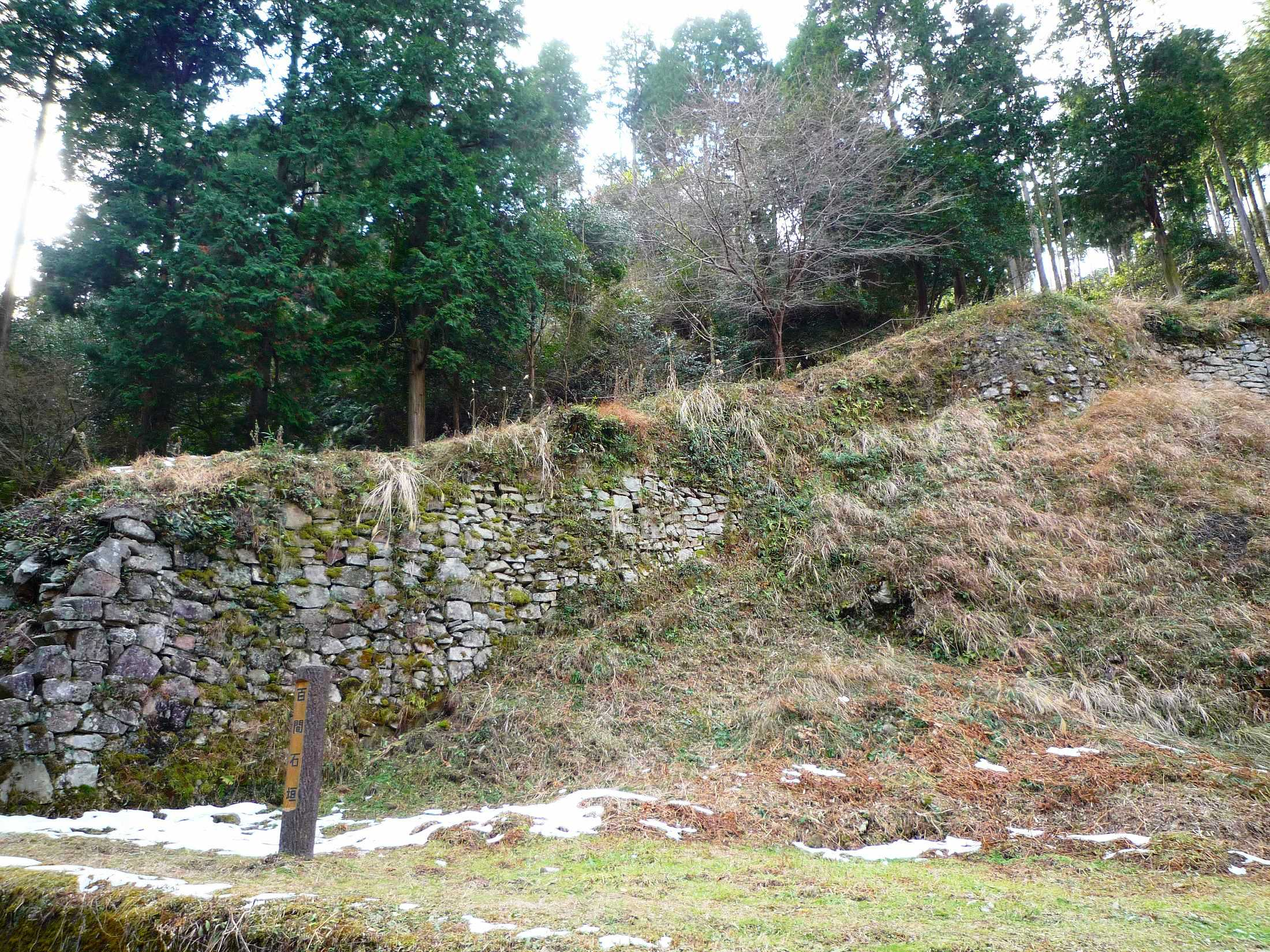
- "Hyakken-Ishigaki" stone wall of Ōno Castle

Site information
- Type: Korean-style fortress
- Condition: Ruins

Site history
- Built: c.660s
- Built by: Yamato court
- In use: Asuka period
- Ōno Castle (Chikuzen Province) (Fukuoka Prefecture) Ōno Castle (Chikuzen Province) (Japan) Special National Historic Site of Japan

Ōno Castle (大野城, Ōno-jō) was an ancient castle (also known as one of the Korean-style fortresses in Japan (朝鮮式山城, Chōsen-shiki yamajiro) straddling the border of the cities of Ōnojō and Dazaifu, and the town of Umi, Fukuoka Prefecture Japan. Its ruins have been protected as a National Historic Site since 1932, and raised to a Special Historic Site since 1953 with the area under protection expanded in 2012. The name of Ōnojō City comes from this castle; however, approximately 80% of the castle area is within the boundaries of Umi Town.

== History ==
After the defeat of the combined Baekje and Yamato Japan forces, at the hands of the Silla and Tang China alliance at the Battle of Hakusukinoe in 663, the Yamato court feared an invasion from either or both Tang or Silla. In response, a huge network of shore fortifications was constructed throughout the rest of the 600s, often with the assistance of Baekje engineers, generals and artisans. Unaware of the outbreak of the Silla-Tang War (670–676), the Japanese would continue to build fortifications until 701, even after finding out that Silla was no longer friendly with Tang. The name "kōgoishi" means "stones of divine protection," a name given them by the Meiji period archaeologist Tsuboi Shōgorō, who conjectured that they served as spiritual or practical protection for sacred sites. Scholars after Tsuboi determined that the structures are most likely the remains of practical, military fortifications, and were unlikely to have significant spiritual connections, although much remains unknown about these structures and there is very little contemporary documentary evidence.

Ōno Castle is located on Mt. Shiōji (also known as Mt. Ōshirō), which towers behind the Dazaifu Government Office ruins on the north side and has an elevation of 410 meters. The outer wall of earthworks and stone embankments, which runs from the horseshoe-shaped ridge around the mountaintop to the valley, is approximately 6.8 kilometers long. The earthworks on the south and north sides are doubled (total wall length is 8.4 km) to strengthen the defense. The castle area is approximately 1.5 kilometers from east-to-west and approximately three kilometers from north-to-south, making it the largest ancient mountain castle in Japan. The sites of nine castle gates have been identified. In addition, in the valley, in addition to the Hyakken Ishigaki and Mizunote Ishigaki stone walls, which have infiltration and natural drainage, there are also Tunsui Ishigaki stone wall with water outlets.

Per the Nihon Shoki, the castle was built in fourth year of the reign of Emperor Tenchi, or 665 AD, with construction carried out largely by exiles from Baekje. An entry dated 698 in the Shoku Nihongi mentions repair work undertaken at Ōno Castle.

Archaeological excavations revealed that the Dazaifu Gate was rebuilt in three stages. In addition, the Kita Ishigaki Gate has a suspended gate structure with a step of approximately one meter in front of the entrance, and this is the first time in Japan that bearing metal fittings for the gatepost have been excavated. The remains of approximately 70 buildings have been confirmed, and several buildings form a group, distributed in eight locations within the castle, including the foundation stones of the main castle keep. There are buildings with standing pillars and buildings with foundation stones, and there are many buildings with all pillars and foundation stones that are thought to be warehouses, but these buildings are said to date from after the initial castle construction period. Excavated artifacts include earthenware with calligraphy, roof tiles, and carbonized rice. Excavations are ongoing.

In July 2003, unusually heavy rains caused landslides, and over a period of six years starting in 2004, restoration work related to the ruins was carried out at approximately 30 locations. Due to the collapse of the earthworks, it was discovered that there were rows of stones at the base of the earthworks throughout the outer perimeter. In addition, a row of postholes was detected in front of the stone row.

On April 6, 2006, Ōno Castle was selected as one of Japan's Top 100 Castles by the Japan Castle Foundation in 2006.

== Gallery ==
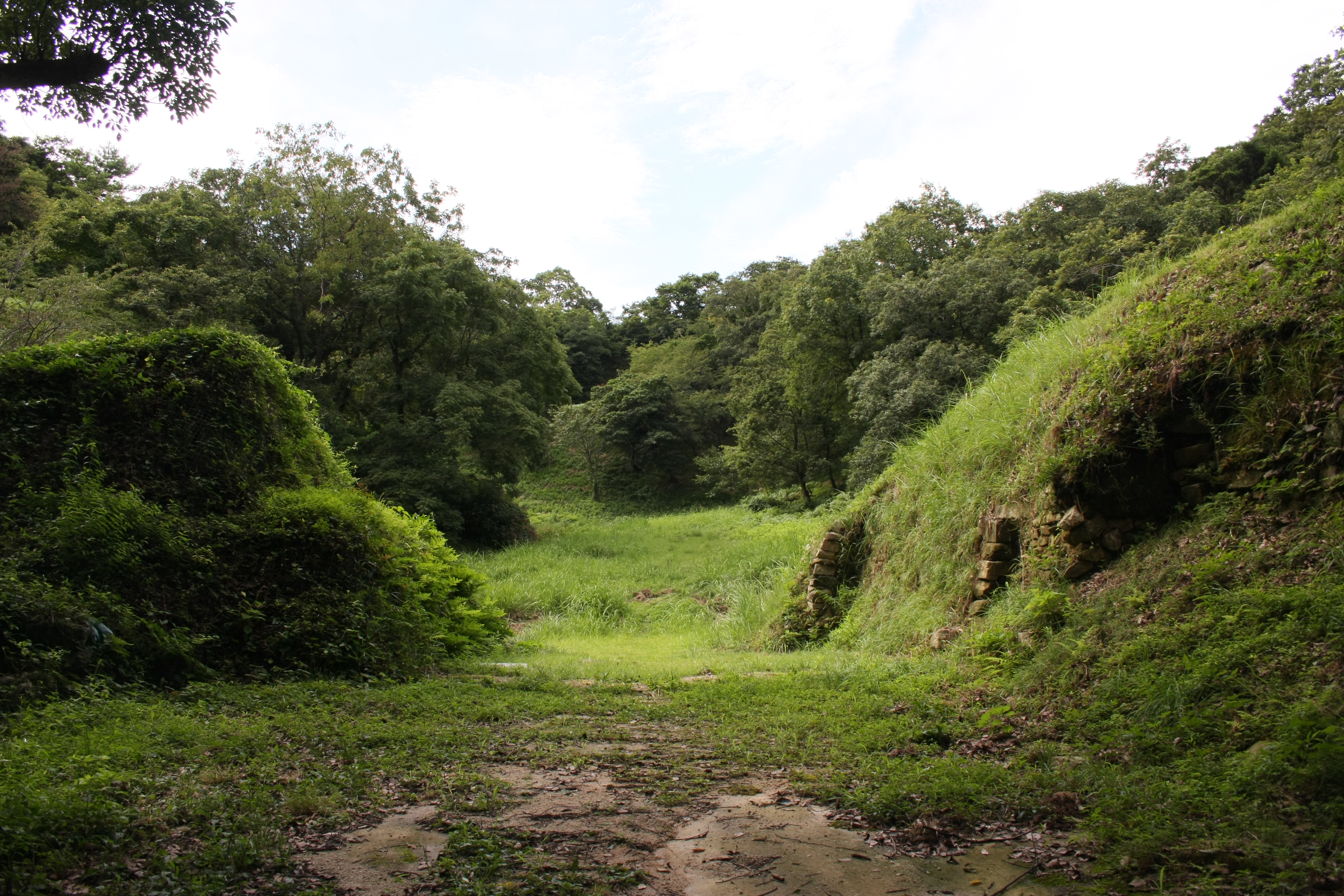
Dazaifu Castle Gate ruis

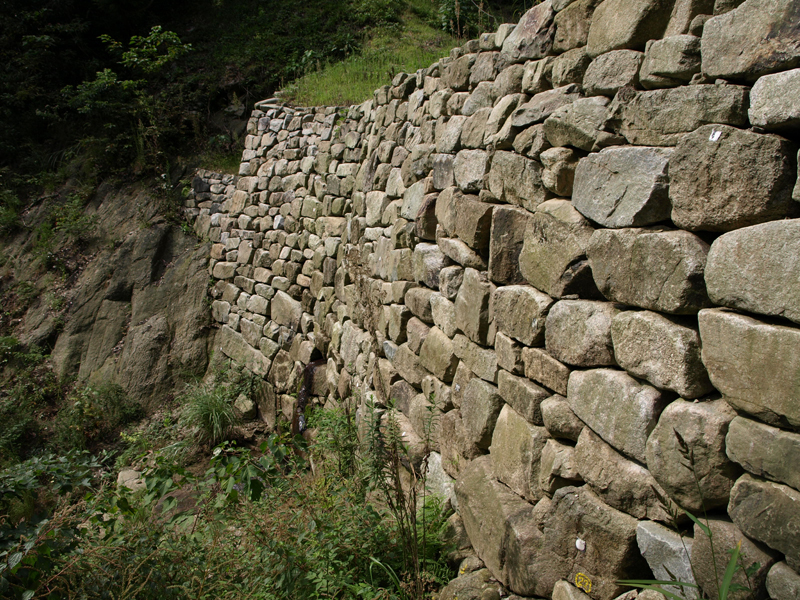
Oishigaki（height 6 meters）

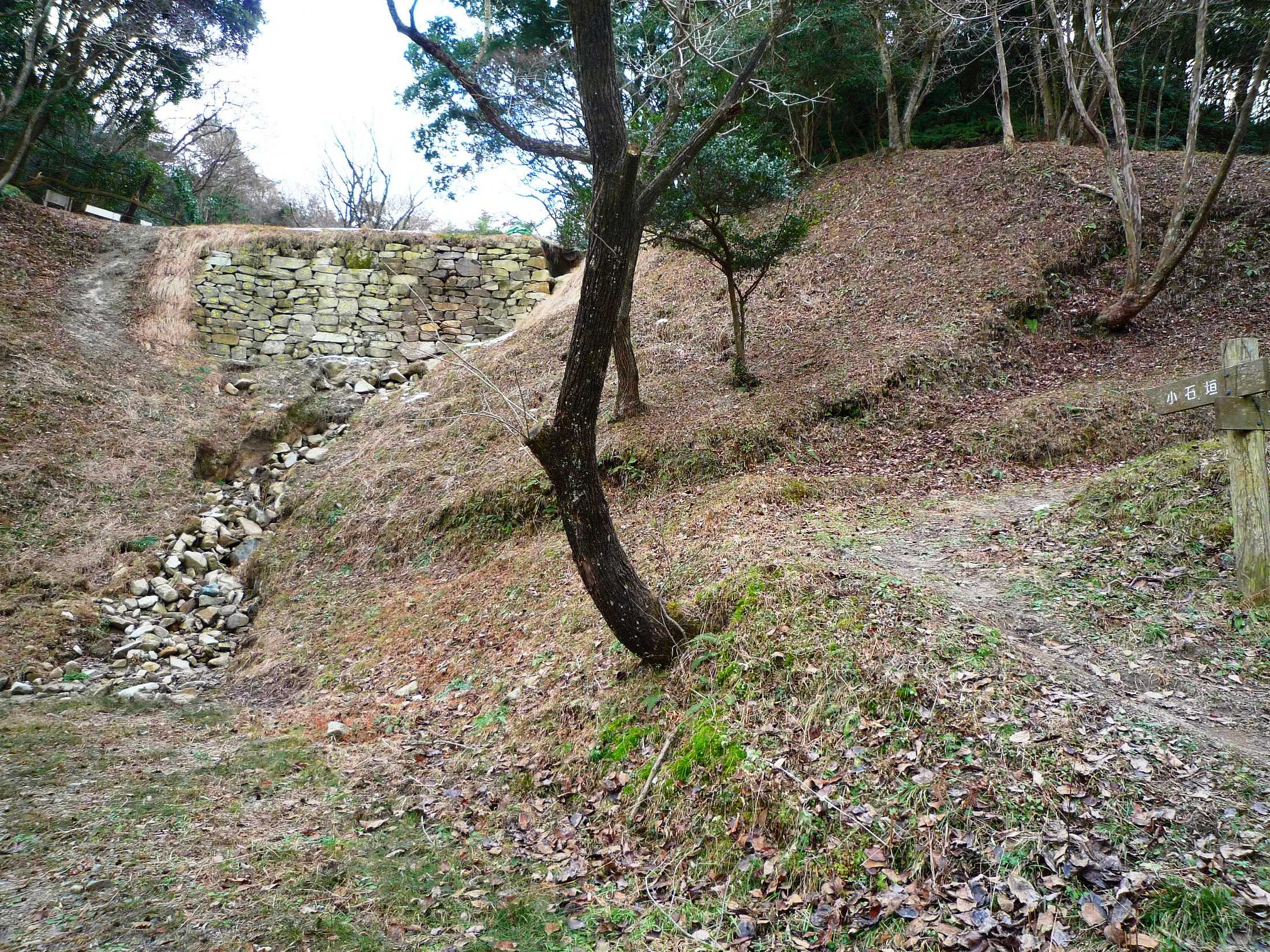
Koishigaki（height 10 meters）

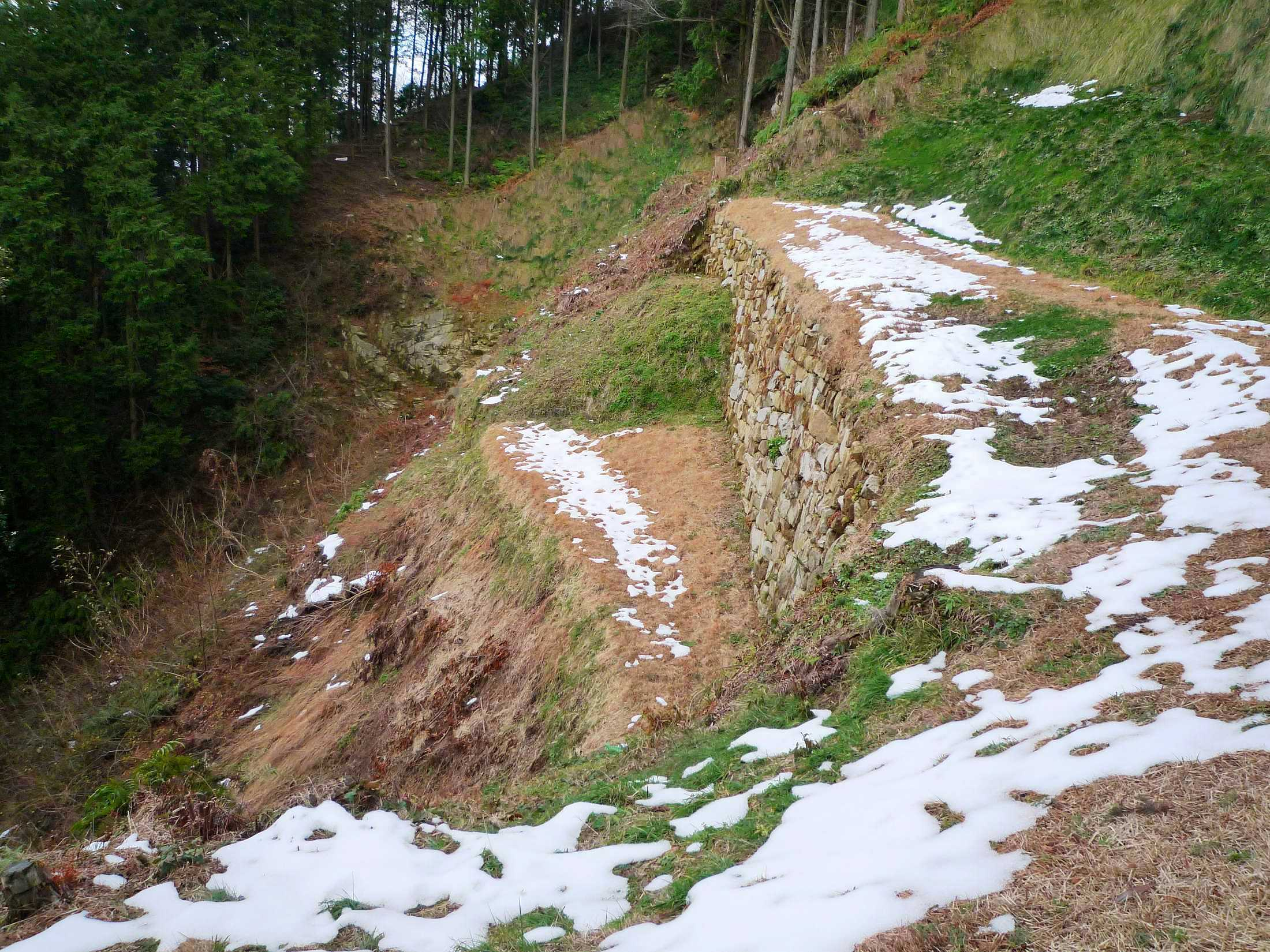
Kitaishigaki（upper level height 4 meters）

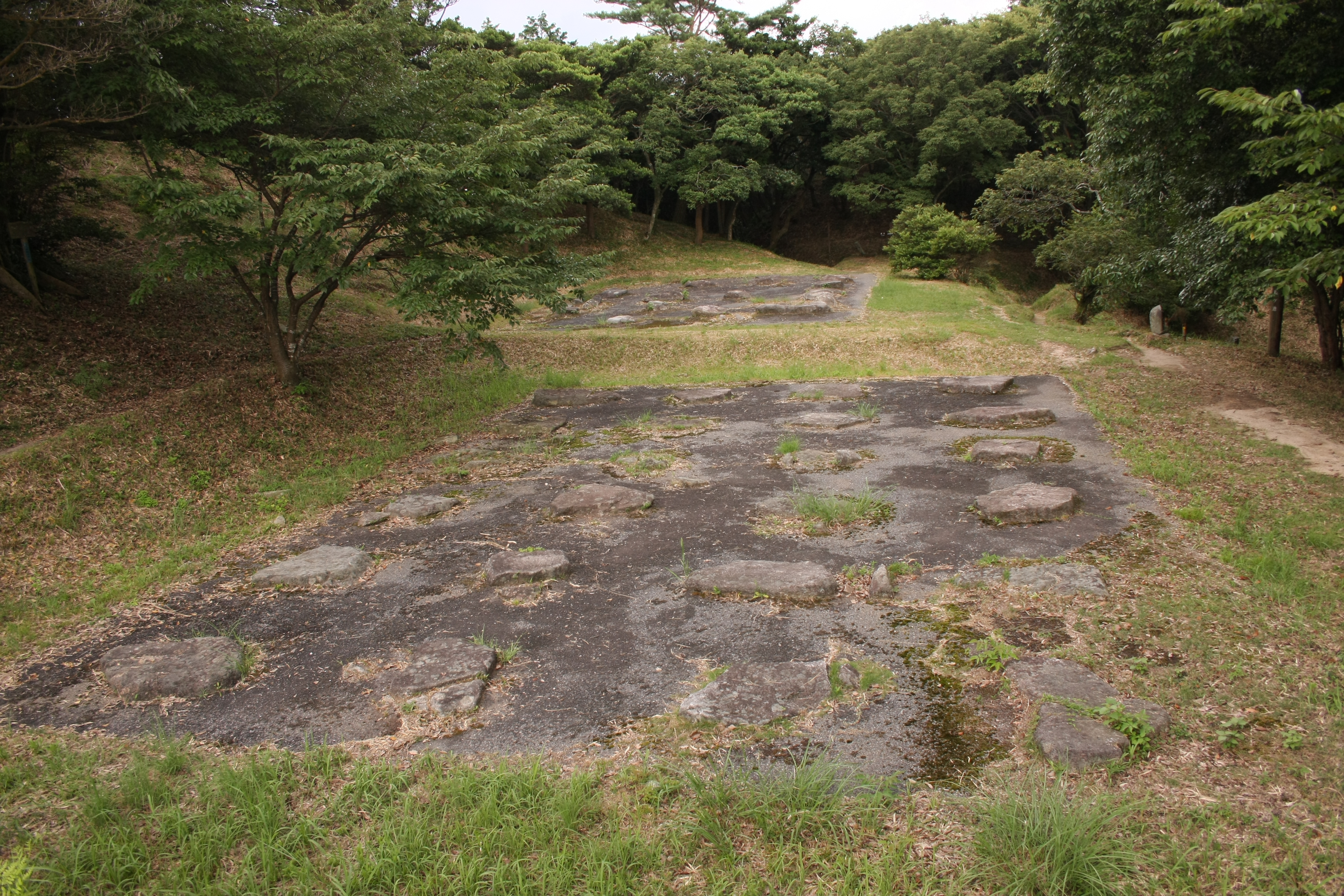
foundation stones

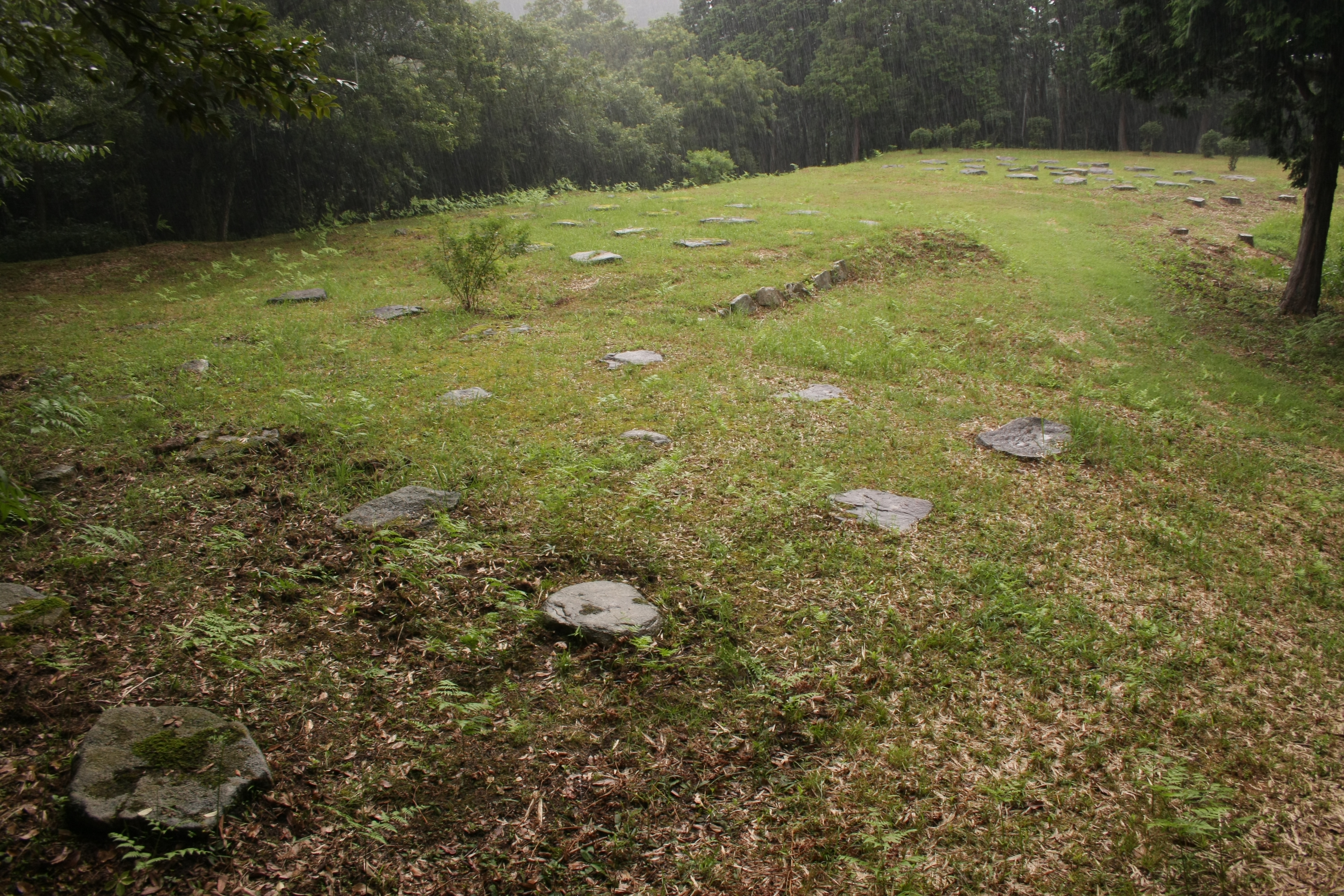
Foundation stones

== See also ==
- List of Historic Sites of Japan (Fukuoka)
- Ōno Castle (Echizen Province)
- Ōno Castle (Chita District, Owari Province)
- List of foreign-style castles in Japan
- Kōgoishi
