= 667 =

Calendar year

667 in various calendars
Gregorian calendar	667; DCLXVII
Ab urbe condita	1420
Armenian calendar	116; ԹՎ ՃԺԶ
Assyrian calendar	5417
Balinese saka calendar	588–589
Bengali calendar	73–74
Berber calendar	1617
Buddhist calendar	1211
Burmese calendar	29
Byzantine calendar	6175–6176
Chinese calendar	丙寅年 (Fire Tiger); 3364 or 3157 — to — 丁卯年 (Fire Rabbit); 3365 or 3158
Coptic calendar	383–384
Discordian calendar	1833
Ethiopian calendar	659–660
Hebrew calendar	4427–4428
- Hindu calendars
Vikram Samvat	723–724
Shaka Samvat	588–589
Kali Yuga	3767–3768
Holocene calendar	10667
Iranian calendar	45–46
Islamic calendar	46–47
Japanese calendar	Hakuchi 18 (白雉１８年)
Javanese calendar	558–559
Julian calendar	667; DCLXVII
Korean calendar	3000
Minguo calendar	1245 before ROC 民前1245年
Nanakshahi calendar	−801
Seleucid era	978/979 AG
Thai solar calendar	1209–1210
Tibetan calendar	མེ་ཕོ་སྟག་ལོ་ (male Fire-Tiger); 793 or 412 or −360 — to — མེ་མོ་ཡོས་ལོ་ (female Fire-Hare); 794 or 413 or −359

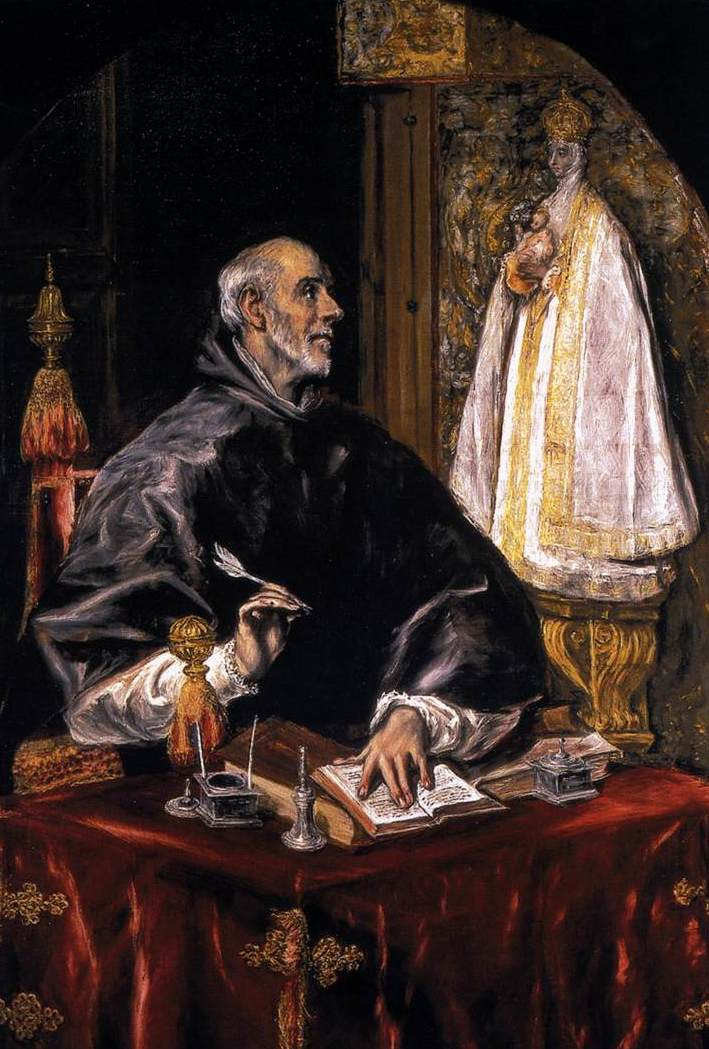
Ildefonsus of Toledo by El Greco (1600–1604)

Year 667 (DCLXVII) was a common year starting on Friday of the Julian calendar. The denomination 667 for this year has been used since the early medieval period, when the Anno Domini calendar era became the prevalent method in Europe for naming years.

== Events ==
=== By place ===
==== Byzantine Empire ====
- Arab–Byzantine War: Caliph Muawiyah I launches a series of attacks against Byzantine holdings in Africa, Sicily and the East.

==== Europe ====
- The Lombards, under King Grimoald I, destroy Oderzo (Northern Italy). Much of its population flees to the nearby city of Heraclea.

==== Arabian Empire ====
- King Javanshir of Caucasian Albania (modern Azerbaijan) revolts against the Muslim-Arabs, but is defeated (approximate date).

=== By topic ===
==== Religion ====
- Wighard, archbishop of Canterbury, dies of the bubonic plague while returning from his consecration in Rome.
- The Abbey of St. Vaast in Arras (France) is founded.

== Births ==
- Hisham ibn Urwah, prominent narrator of hadith and scholar
- Qasim ibn Hasan, son of Hassan ibn Ali

== Deaths ==
- January 23 – Ildefonsus, bishop of Toledo
- Daoxuan, Chinese Buddhist monk (b. 596)
- Severus Sebokht, Syrian scholar and bishop
- Su Dingfang, general of the Tang dynasty (b. 591)
- Wighard, archbishop of Canterbury (approximate date)
