= Kōgoishi =

Earthworks of the Japanese Asuka Period

Kōgoishi (神篭石 or 神籠石) are earthenwork structures, on a stone foundation, constructed in Japan during the Asuka period, particularly in areas around Fukuoka, on the island of Kyūshū. The name "kōgoishi" means "stones of divine protection," a name given them by the Meiji period archaeologist Tsuboi Shōgorō, who conjectured that they served as spiritual or practical protection for sacred sites.

Kōgoishi date to the 6th or 7th century CE, and are found predominantly in northern Kyūshū and on the shores of the Inland Sea. The longest one to be found, at 2.3 km in length, lies near the summit of Mount Kōra (ja:高良山), near Fukuoka. The stones there are roughly one meter long, 50 cm high and 70 cm thick.

Scholars after Tsuboi determined that the structures are most likely the remains of practical, military fortifications, and were unlikely to have significant spiritual connections. The style and form of the ruins matches many in Korea; the period when these were built was one of flourishing contact with Korea, and it is theorized that Korean stoneworkers, artisans, and architects may have played a role in the construction of these fortresses. Many scholars believe that some kōgoishi were built in anticipation of an attack from Korea, which never materialized.
