= Yamato period =

Period of Japanese history from c. 250 to 710

The Yamato period (大和時代, Yamato-jidai) is the period of Japanese history when the imperial court ruled from modern-day Nara Prefecture, then known as Yamato Province.

While conventionally assigned to the period 250–710, including both the Kofun period (c. 250–538) and the Asuka period (538–710), the actual start of Yamato rule is disputed. The Yamato court's supremacy was challenged during the Kofun period by other polities centered in various parts of Japan. What is certain is that Yamato clans had major advantages over their neighbouring clans in the 6th century. This period is divided by the relocation of the capital to Asuka, in modern Nara Prefecture. However, the Kofun period is an archaeological period while the Asuka period is a historical period. Therefore, many think of this as an old division and this concept of period division is no longer applicable.

At the era of Prince Shōtoku in the early 7th century, a new constitution was prescribed for Japan based on the Chinese model. After the fall of Baekje (660 AD), the Yamato government sent envoys directly to the Chinese court, from which they obtained a great wealth of Confucian philosophical and social structure. In addition to ethics and government, they also adopted the Chinese calendar and many of its religious practices, including Confucianism and Taoism (Japanese: Onmyo).

== Background of Yamato society and culture ==
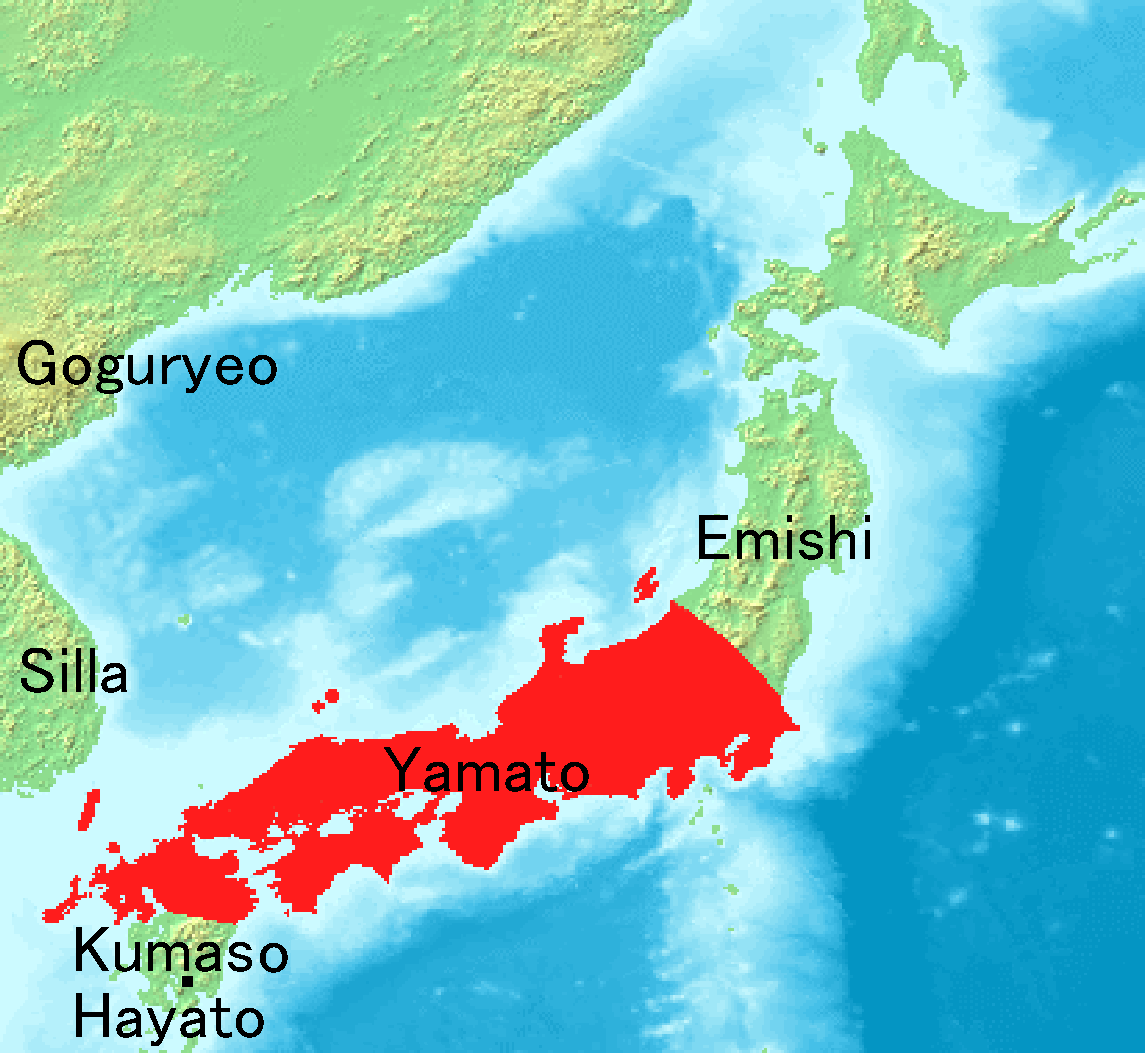
Yamato, in the 7th century

A millennium earlier, the Japanese archipelago had been inhabited by the Jōmon people. In the centuries prior to the beginning of the Yamato period, elements of the Northeast Asian and Chinese civilizations had been introduced to the Japanese archipelago in waves of migration. According to Kojiki, the oldest record of Japan, Amenohiboko, Korean prince of Silla, came to Japan to serve the Japanese Emperor and he lived in Tajima Province. His descendant is believed to be Tajimamori. Archaeological evidence indicates contacts between mainland China, Korea, and Japan since prehistory of the Neolithic period, and its continuation also at least in the Kofun period.

The rice-growing, politically fragmented Yayoi culture either evolved into the new Japanese culture characterized by the more centralized, patriarchal, militaristic Kofun period or came to be dominated and eventually overrun by Yamato society.

By this time, Japonic had also spread to the Ryukyu Islands such as Okinawa. The Ryukyuan languages and Japanese most likely diverged during this period.

== Kofun period ==
The Kofun period (古墳時代, Kofun-jidai) is an era in the history of Japan from around 250 to 538. The word kofun is Japanese for the type of burial mounds dating from this era.

During the Kofun period, elements of Chinese culture continued to influence culture in the Japanese archipelago, both through waves of migration and through trade, travel, and cultural change. Archaeological evidence indicates contacts between the mainland and Japan also during this period. Most scholars believe that there were massive transmissions of technology and culture from China via Korea peninsula to Japan which is evidenced by material artifacts in tombs of both states in the Proto–Three Kingdoms of Korea and Kofun period, as well as the later wave of Baekje refugees to Yamato.

Archaeological records and ancient Chinese sources Book of Song indicate that the various tribes and chiefdom of the Japanese Archipelago did not begin to coalesce into more centralized and hierarchical polities until 300 (well into the Kofun period), when large tombs begin to appear while there were no contacts between the Wa and China. Some describe the "mysterious century" as a time of internecine warfare as various local monarchies competed for hegemony on Kyūshū and Honshū.

Japan of the Kofun age was positive in the introduction of Chinese culture. Several kinds of goods were imported. Books from China were one of the most important trade goods. Chinese philosophy that had been introduced in this era, had a big influence on the history of Japan. Decorated bronze mirrors (Shinju-kyo) were imported from China. Japan imported iron from Korean peninsula until the latter half of the 6th century.

In this period, Baekje received military support from Japan. According to the Samguk Sagi, King Asin of Baekje sent his son Jeonji to Japan in 397 and King Silseong of Silla sent his son Misaheun to Japan in 402 in order to solicit military aid.

=== Kofun tombs ===
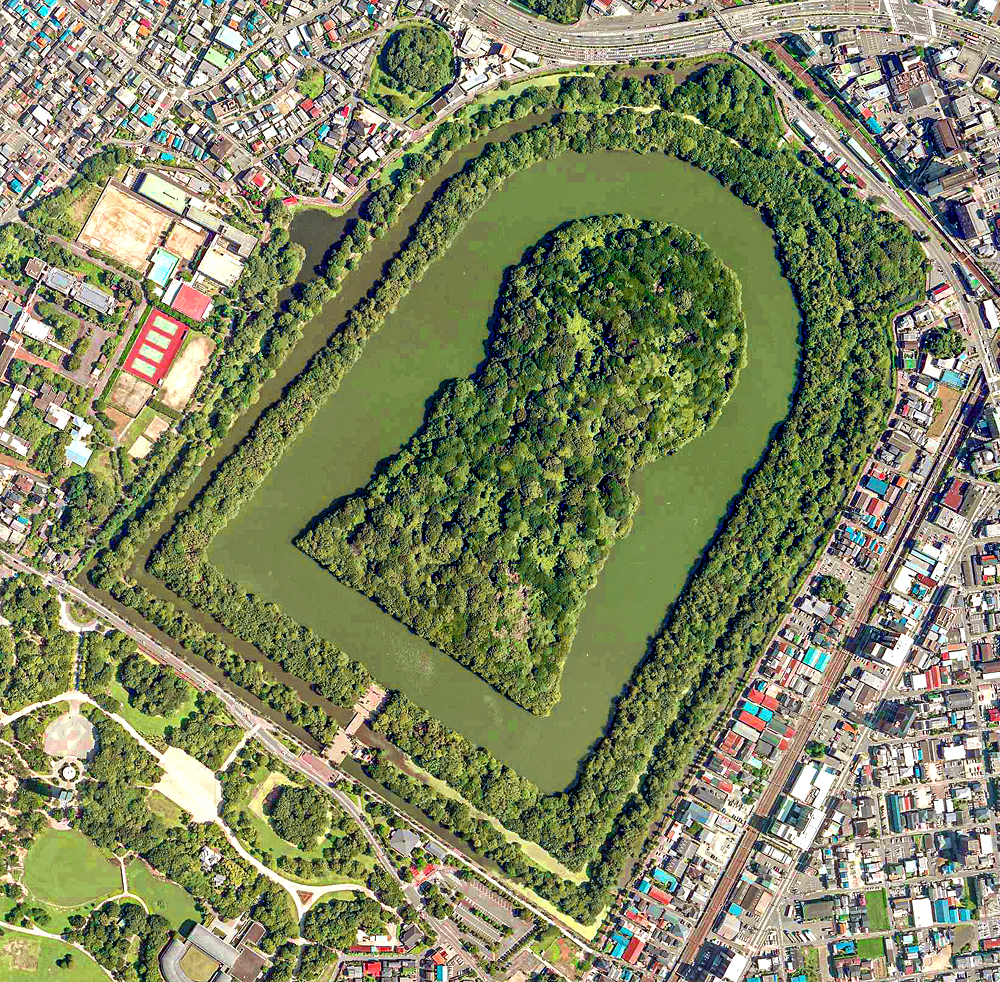
Daisen Kofun, the tomb of Emperor Nintoku, Osaka, 5th century.

Kofun (古墳, "old tomb") are burial mounds which were built for the people of the ruling class during the 3rd to 7th centuries. The Kofun period takes its name from these distinctive earthen mounds which are associated with the rich funerary rituals of the time. The mounds contained large stone burial chambers. Some are surrounded by moats.

Kofun came in many shapes, with round and square being the simplest. A distinct style is the keyhole kofun (前方後円墳 zenpō kōen fun), with its square front and round back. Many kofuns were natural hills, which might have been sculpted to their final shape. Kofun range in size from several meters to over 400 meters in length.

By the late Kofun period, the distinctive burial chambers, originally used by the ruling elite, were also built for commoners.

The biggest kofun are believed to be the tombs of emperors like Emperor Ōjin (応神天皇 Ōjin Tennō) and Emperor Nintoku (仁徳天皇 Nintoku Tennō). Kofun are also classified according to whether the entrance to the stone burial chamber is vertical (縦穴 tate-ana) or horizontal (横穴 yoko-ana).

=== Immigrants in early Japan ===
Japan of the Kofun period was very receptive to influence from China. Chinese and Korean immigrants played an important role in introducing elements of Chinese culture to early Japan.

Yamato links to the mainland and the Liu Song dynasty in 425 and 478 were facilitated by the maritime knowledge and diplomatic connections of China and the Three Kingdoms of the Korean Peninsula, especially Baekje.

Many important figures were immigrants from East Asia. Yamato Imperial Court officially edited the Shinsen Shōjiroku in 815 as a directory of aristocrats which lists 1182 names of clans which were in Kinai area, it lists a number of clans from Mainland Asia. According to the directory, 120 clans have roots in Baekje, 48 clans in Goguryeo, 17 clans in Silla, 9 clans in Gaya and the other 174 clans "Kan (漢)" (now obsolete general term for ancient Koreans) of the Korean peninsula.

The Azumi people were a warrior tribe from northern Kyushu. They were extremely skilled seafarers. The Azumi gained early contact with the Yamato Court and provided maritime trade links and influenced the Yamato Court's military and diplomatic approach in the seas. Thus the Japanese imperial government employed them as their naval force from the 3rd to 5th centuries. Certain experts regard the Azumi as "the oldest known maritime force of [Japan's] emerging imperial state." Some Japanese historians think they were of Austronesian origin and related to the Hayato people who lived in southern Kyushu.

=== Kofun society ===
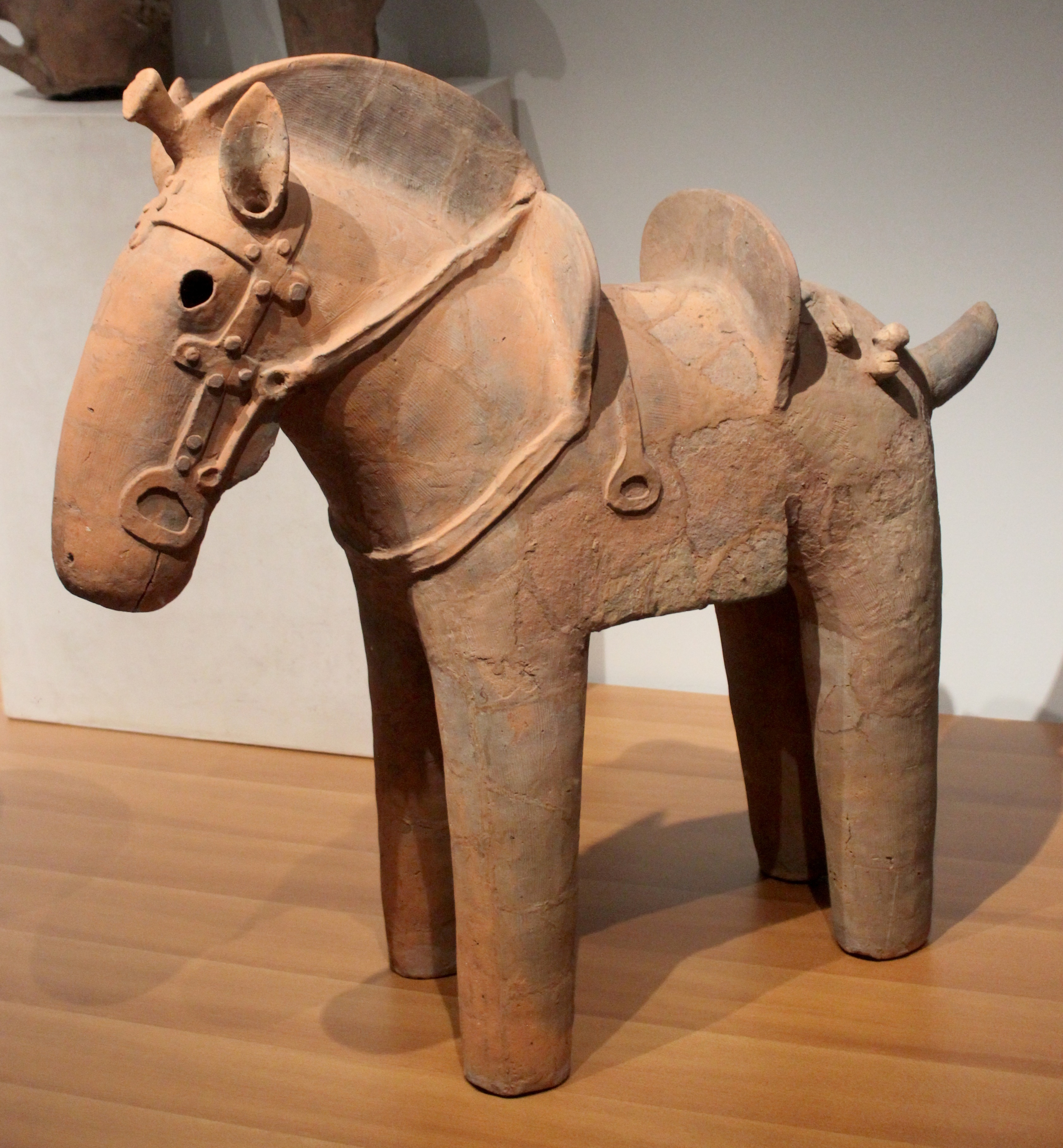
Haniwa horse statuette, complete with saddle and stirrups, 6th century.

The Kofun period was a critical stage in Japan's evolution toward a more cohesive and recognized state. This society was most developed in the Kansai Region and the easternmost part of the Inland Sea. Japan's rulers of the time even petitioned the Chinese court for confirmation of royal titles. The Yamato polity, which emerged by the late 5th century, was distinguished by powerful great clans or extended families, including their dependants. Each clan was headed by a patriarch who performed sacred rites to the clan's kami to ensure the long-term welfare of the clan. Clan members were the aristocracy, and the kingly line that controlled the Yamato court was at its pinnacle. The Kofun period of Japanese culture is also sometimes called the Yamato period by some Western scholars since this local chieftainship arose to become the Imperial dynasty at the end of the Kofun period.

== Asuka period ==
The Asuka period (飛鳥時代, Asuka-jidai) is generally defined as from 538 to 710. The arrival of Buddhism marked a change in Japanese society and affected the Yamato government.

The Yamato state evolved much during the Asuka period, which is named after the Asuka region, south of modern Nara, the site of numerous temporary imperial capitals established during the period. The Asuka period is known for its significant artistic, social, and political transformations, which had their origins in the late Kofun period.

Artistically, the term Tori Style is often used for the Asuka period. This is from the sculptor Kuratsukuri Tori, grandson of Chinese immigrant Shiba Tatto. Tori Style inherits Chinese Northern Wei style.

The arts during the Asuka and Nara periods are similar to contemporaneous art in China and Korea. One example of this is Tori Busshi's Shaka Triad which reflects the style of early to mid-sixth-century Chinese style.

=== Introduction of Buddhism ===
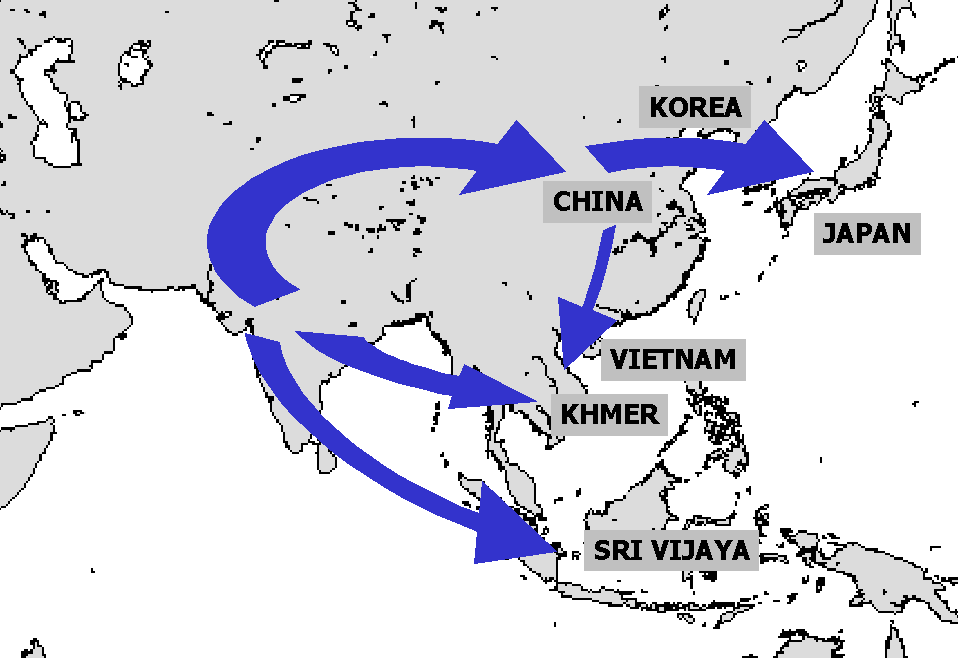
Mahāyāna Buddhism officially introduced to Japan in 538.

According to Nihon Shoki, Mahāyāna Buddhism (大乗仏教, Daijō Bukkyō) was officially introduced to the Yamato court through Baekje in 552, while it is widely recognized Buddhism was introduced in 538 based on the biography of Prince Shōtoku (Jōgū Shōtoku Hōō Teisetsu) and the record of Gangō-ji (Gangōji Garan Engi).

Initial uptake of Buddhism was slow. Nihon Shoki records that when Emperor Kinmei discussed about the acceptance of this new foreign religion, Soga no Iname expressed his support while Mononobe no Okoshi and Nakatomi no Kamako (later the Fujiwara clan) opposed not on religious grounds, but more so as the results of feelings of nationalism and a degree of xenophobia.

With the dawn of the Asuka period, the use of elaborate kofun tombs by the imperial family and other elite fell out of use because of prevailing new Buddhist beliefs, which put greater emphasis on the transience of human life. Commoners and the elite in outlying regions, however, continued to use kofun until the late seventh century, and simpler but distinctive tombs continued in use throughout the following period.

Buddhism only started to spread after Mononobe no Moriya lost in the Battle of Shigisan in 587 where the Mononobe clan was defeated and crushed, and Empress Suiko openly encouraged the acceptance of Buddhism among all Japanese people. In 607, in order to obtain copies of Sutras, an imperial embassy was dispatched to Sui dynasty China.

== Yamato Imperial Court ==
The Yamato Imperial Court (大和朝廷, Yamato-Chōtei) was named because there were many palace capitals in the southern part of the Yamato Plain in Nara during the Kofun period and the Asuka period. The Asuka period is known for its significant artistic, social, and political transformations, which had their origins in the late Kofun period.

The second half of the Kofun period, exercised power over clans in Kyushu and Honshu, bestowing titles, some hereditary, on clan chieftains. The Yamato name became synonymous with all of Japan as the Yamato rulers suppressed the clans and acquired agricultural lands. Based on Chinese models (including the adoption of the Chinese written language), they developed a central administration and an imperial court attended by subordinate clan chieftains but with no permanent capital. Asuka period mid-seventh century, the agricultural lands had grown to a substantial public domain, subject to the central policy. The basic administrative unit of the Gokishichido system was the county, and society was organized into occupation groups. Most people were farmers; others were fishers, weavers, potters, artisans, armorers, and ritual specialists.

== Events ==
- 538: The Korean kingdom of Baekje dispatches a delegation to introduce Buddhism to the Japanese emperor
- 593: Prince Shōtoku of the Soga clan rules Japan and promotes Buddhism
- 600: Prince Shōtoku sends the first official Japanese mission to China
- 604: Prince Shōtoku issues a Chinese-style constitution (Kenpo Jushichijo), based on Confucian principles, which de facto inaugurates the Japanese empire
- 605: Prince Shōtoku declares Buddhism and Confucianism the state religions of Japan
- 607: Prince Shōtoku builds the Buddhist temple Horyuji in the Asuka valley
- 645: Prince Shōtoku is succeeded by Kotoku Tenno, who strengthens imperial power over aristocratic clans (Taika Reform), turning their states into provinces
- 663: Yamato naval and allied Korean Baekje forces are defeated by the naval forces of China's Tang dynasty at the Battle of Baekgang

== See also ==
- Asuka
- History of Japan
- Kofun era
- Nara period
- Yayoi
- Zenpokoenfun
- Origins of Japan
