= Ito Castle =

Castle ruins in Itoshima, Fukuoka, Japan

- 怡土城
- Itoshima, Fukuoka, Japan
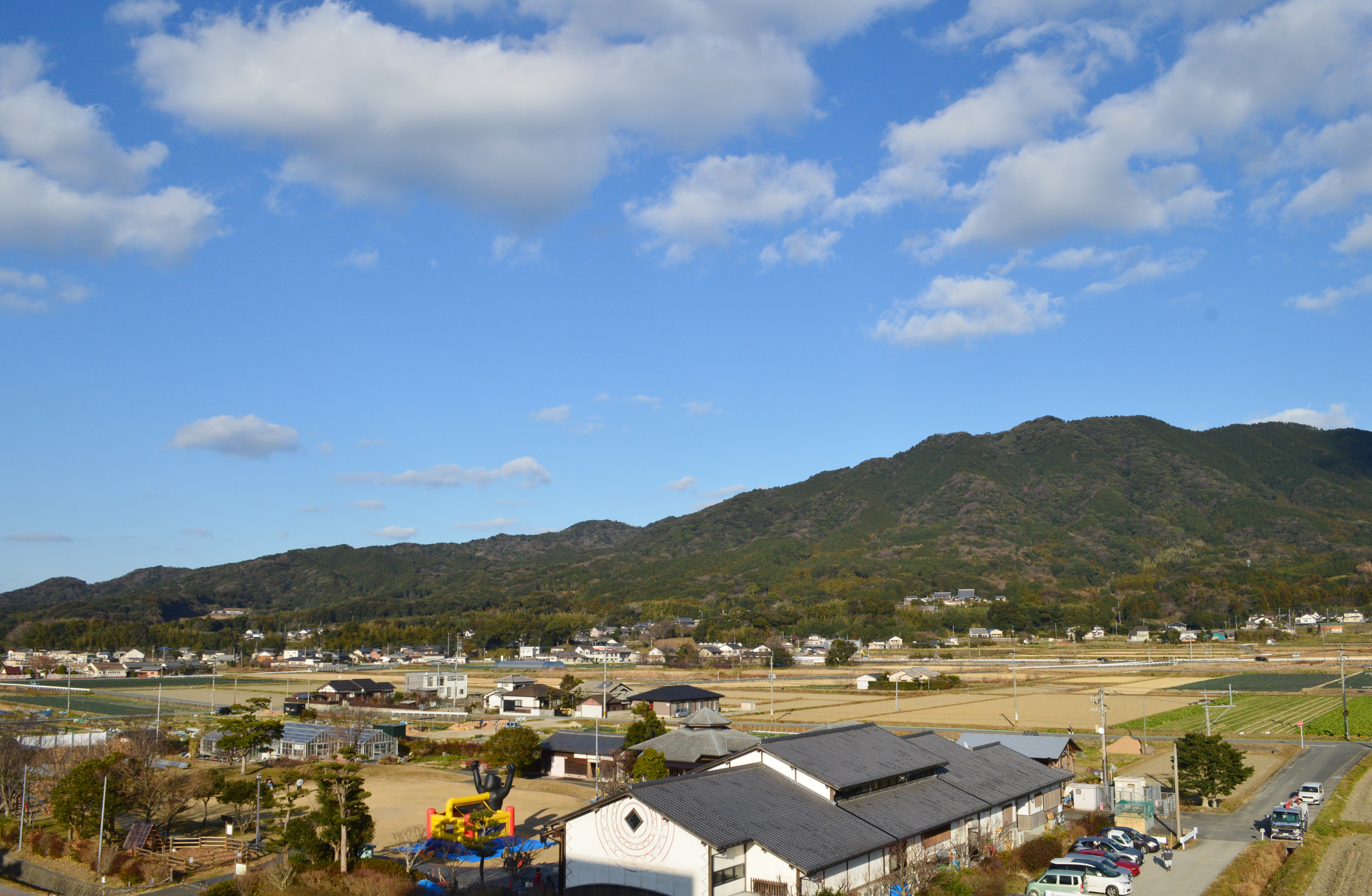
- Mount Takasu, site of Ito Castle

Site information
- Type: Chinese-style fortress
- Condition: Ruins

Site history
- Built: c.660s
- Built by: Yamato court
- In use: Nara period
- Ito Castle (Fukuoka Prefecture) Ito Castle (Japan) National Historic Site of Japan

Ito Castle (怡土城, Ito-jō) was an ancient castle (also known as a Korean-style fortresses in Japan (朝鮮式山城, Chōsen-shiki yamajiro) located in the city of Itoshima, Fukuoka Prefecture Japan. Its ruins have been protected as a National Historic Site since 1938, with the area under protection expanded in 1944 and in 2007.

== History ==
After the defeat of the combined Baekje and Yamato Japan forces, at the hands of the Silla and Tang China alliance at the Battle of Hakusukinoe in 663, the Yamato court feared an invasion from either or both Tang or Silla. In response, a huge network of shore fortifications was constructed throughout the rest of the 600s, often with the assistance of Baekje engineers, generals and artisans. Unaware of the outbreak of the Silla-Tang War (670–676), the Japanese would continue to build fortifications until 701, even after finding out that Silla was no longer friendly with Tang. The name "kōgoishi" means "stones of divine protection," a name given them by the Meiji period archaeologist Tsuboi Shōgorō, who conjectured that they served as spiritual or practical protection for sacred sites. Scholars after Tsuboi determined that the structures are most likely the remains of practical, military fortifications, and were unlikely to have significant spiritual connections, although much remains unknown about these structures and there is very little contemporary documentary evidence. Ito Castle in unique in this class of fortifications, in that it was built much later, in the Nara period and details of its construction dates and the people involved are known. It is also less in the style of Korean-style fortresses, but exhibits characteristics of continental Chinese-style mountain fortresses.

Ito Castle is located on the western slopes of 955-meter Mount Takasuyama at an elevation of 416 meters. The ruins include the remains of eight watchtowers (monomiyagura) along the line of the ridge, and a two kilometer stretch of earthen ramparts from north-to-south at the base of the mountain. Studies of some of the earthworks indicate that concentrated seawater and lime-based materials may have been mixed in with the earth to increase the strength of the rampart.There was once a moat 15 meters wide on the outside of the earthworks, and it is assumed that there was also an inner moat in some parts of the castle.

Per the Shoku Nihongi, construction of the castle was started in 756 AD by Kibi no Makibi, who went to Tang China twice as an envoy from the Japanese court and it was completed in 768. Kibi no Makibi was a man skilled in military tactics, and it is assumed that be obtained knowledge of contemporary Chinese fortifications during these visits. The purpose of building the castle was either in preparation for the conquest of Silla by Japan, or protection against invasion by Tang China during the An Lushan rebellion. Also, as Kibi no Makibi was a political rival of Fujiwara no Nakamaro, construction of the castle also served the purpose of removing him from proximity to the Imperial court for several years. The castle was never used in combat, and fell into ruins by the early Heian period. Centuries later, the Harada clan, who ruled Itoshima during the Sengoku period, reused this site and built Takaso Castle, which served as their base until it was destroyed by Toyotomi Hideyoshi in 1587.

Numerous pieces of roof tiles, pottery, and walls have been discovered from the castle area in archaeological excavations starting in 1938. While most of the tiles are flat tiles, no round tiles or eaves tiles have been excavated. A flat tiles are large, measuring approximately 41 by 31 centimeters, and approximately five centimeters in thick, with a weight of ten kilograms. The location of the tile kiln where the tiles were fired is not clear. Excavated items are displayed at the Itokoku History Museum in Itoshima.

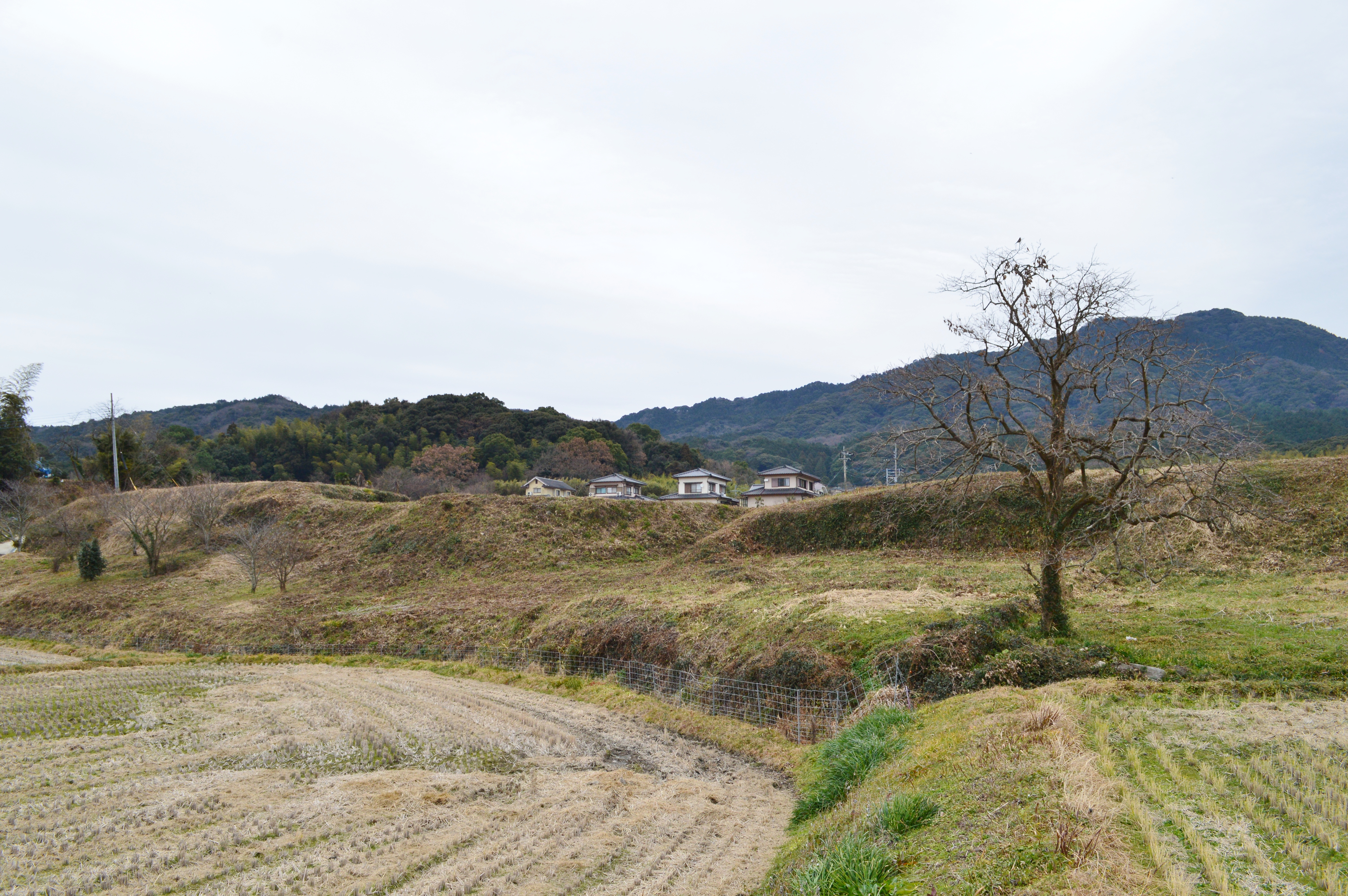
Remnants of earthen ramparts

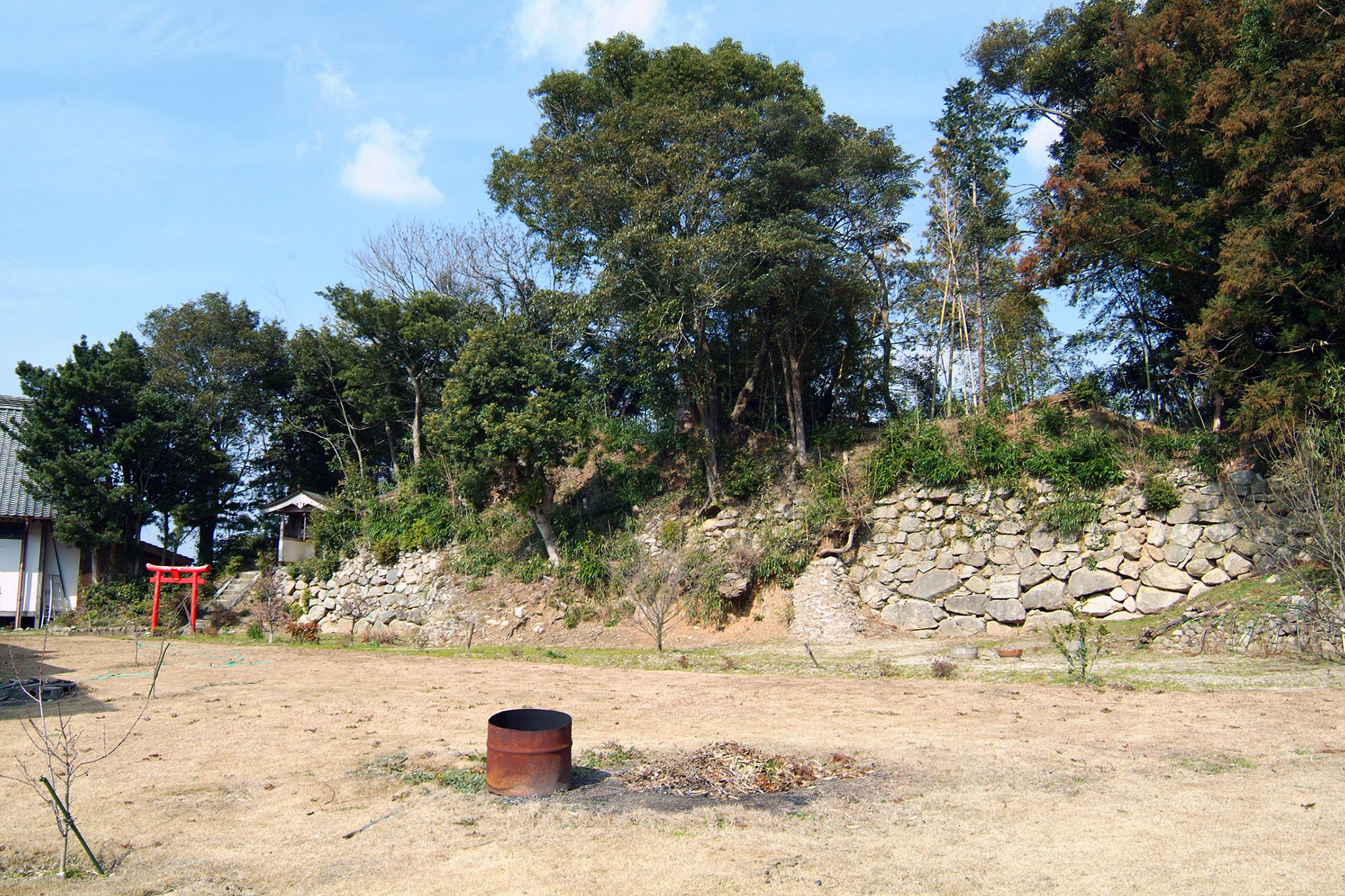
Remnants of stone walls

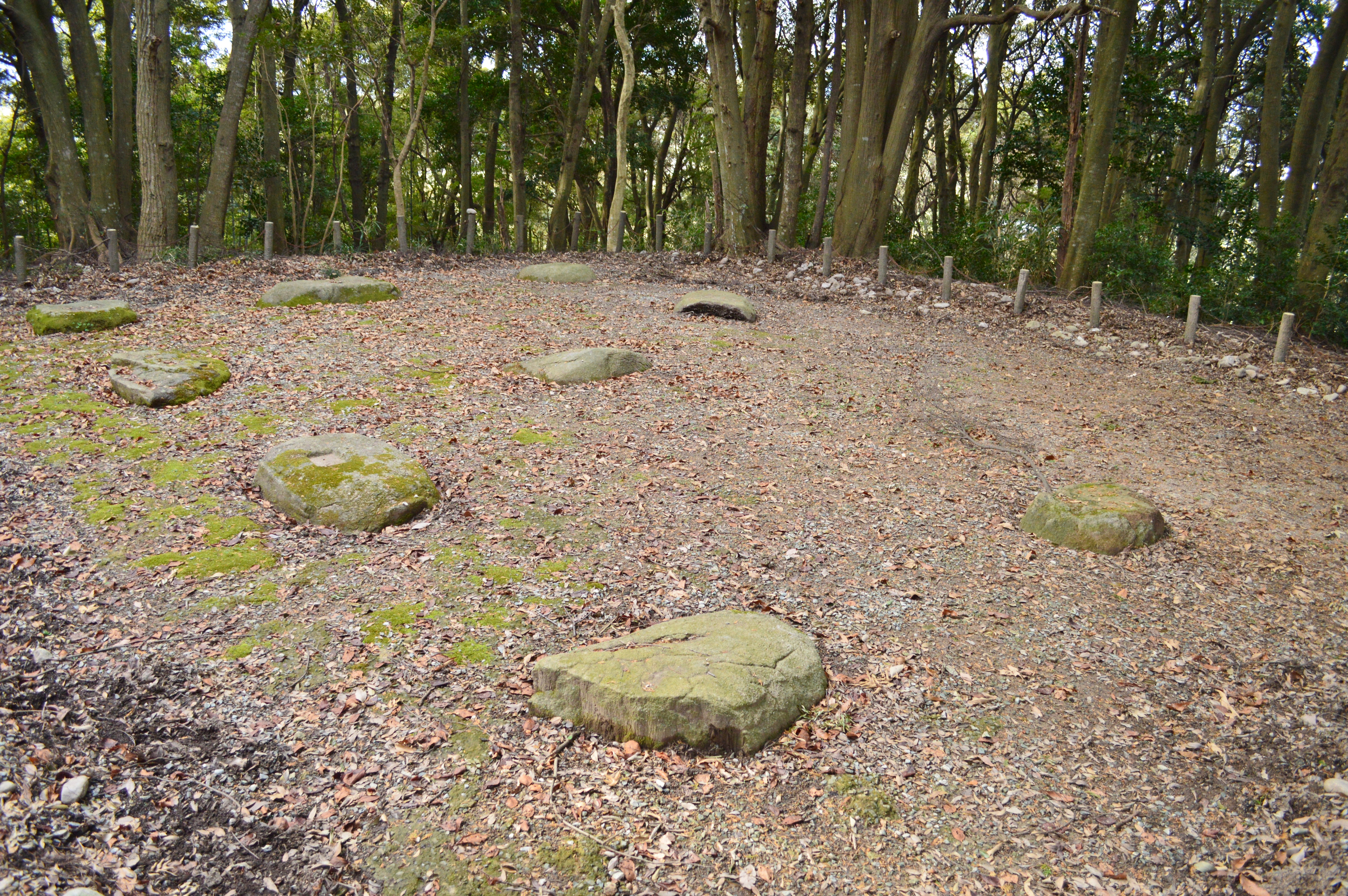
Foundation stones for watchtower

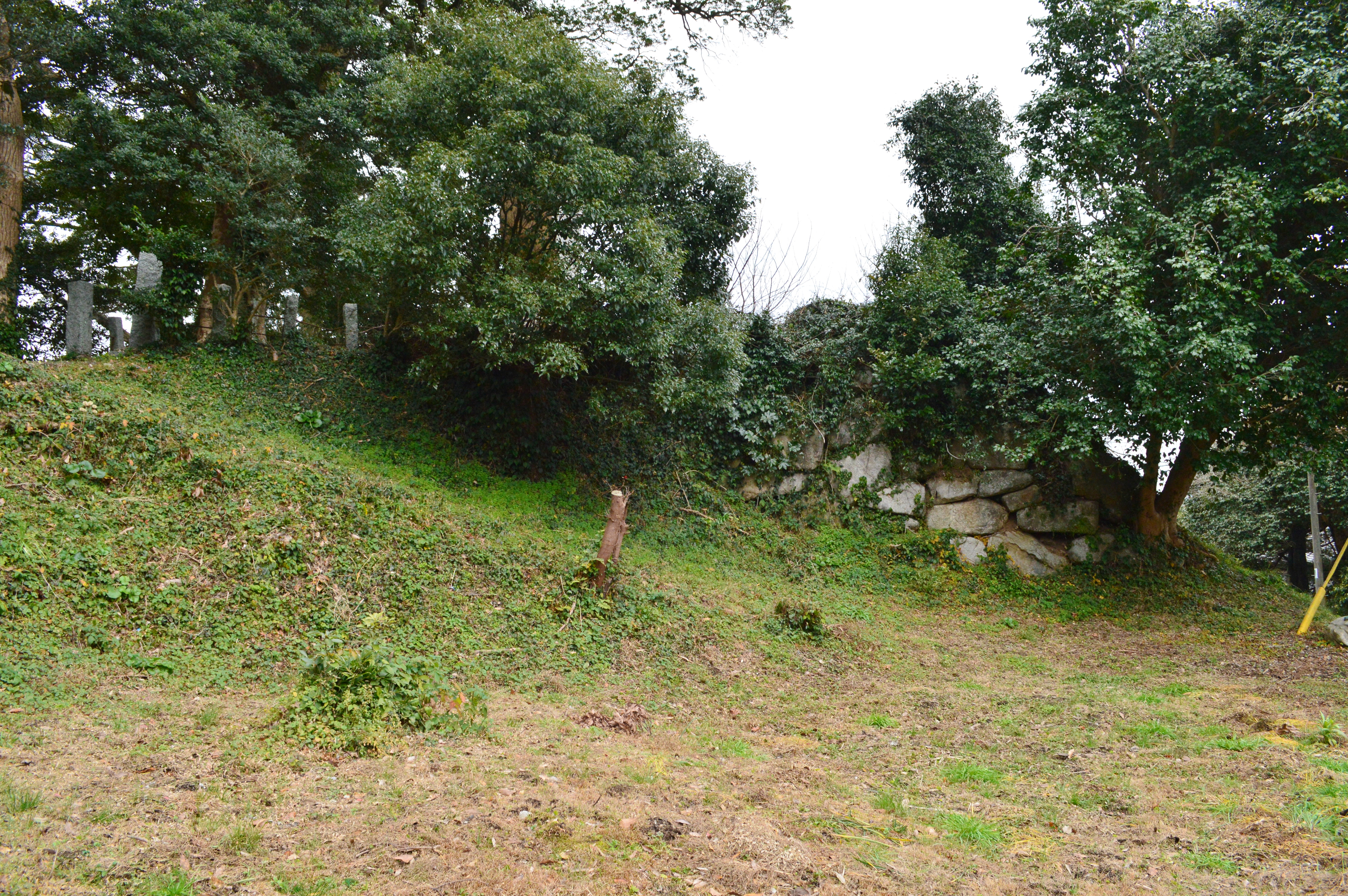
Ruins of a gate

== See also ==
- List of Historic Sites of Japan (Fukuoka)
- List of foreign-style castles in Japan
- Kōgoishi

== Literature ==
- De Lange, William (2021). An Encyclopedia of Japanese Castles. Groningen: Toyo Press. pp. 600 pages. ISBN 978-9492722300.
