= Wakoku =

Historical state

Wa-koku (倭國, literally "Wa-nation") was the name used by early imperial China and its neighbouring states to refer to the nation usually identified as Japan. There are various theories regarding the extent of power of the early kings of Japan. According to the Book of Sui and the History of the Northern Dynasties, its borders were five months from east to west and three months from north to south. The Wajin ethnic group who lived in the Japanese archipelago appear in historical documents such as the Book of Han which was finished in 111 CE. In the late 7th century, the Yamato kingdom changed its external name to Japan (Nippon, 日本). The earliest record of this appears in the Chinese Old Book of Tang, which notes the change in 703 when Japanese envoys requested that its name be changed. Given the ambiguity in the Hou Hanshu, it is unclear if the Chinese imperial agreed to the changes. There are also some discrepancies in the descriptions of the event between the Old and the New Book of Tang.

== History ==
=== Formation of small states and the Civil War of Wa ===
In 57 CE, the chief of Nakoku of Wa, which is said to have been located in northern Kyushu (along the coast of Hakata Bay), received a gold seal from Emperor Guangwu of Han.

In the 2nd year of the jianwu zhongyuan reign period [57 CE], the Nakoku state of Wa sent an envoy with tribute. The envoy introduced himself as a high official. The state lies in the far south of Wa. [Emperor] Guangwu bestowed on him a seal with a tassel.

— Book of the Later Han, Volume 85 - Treatise on the Dongyi

It is believed that this was the result of the consolidation of Japanese polities in northern Kyushu, and that the Yamato Kingship sent an envoy to the Eastern Han Dynasty as a representative of these groups.

The Nakoku found in the Wajinden of the Records of the Three Kingdoms is said to be located in the plains of Fukuoka. The gold seal, described in the Hou Hanshu, has been excavated from this area, as well as a Western Han mirror dating back to the 1st century BCE.

Several burial sites from the Yayoi period have been found and excavated around the area of Itoshima City. Among these are the dolmen grave clusters of Shinmachi and Shito and the burial mounds located in the Sone and Arita neighborhoods of Itoshima, which is thought to have been the center of the ancient "Ito Province”.

In the first year of the reign of Emperor An of Han, called the Yongchu era, which began in the year 107 CE, the Japanese king Suishō sent an envoy to the Eastern Han Dynasty and presented 160 people to the Emperor.

In the first year of the reign of Emperor An's Yongchu, the king of the Yamato kingdom, Suishō, and others presented a hundred and sixty people to the court.

— Book of the Later Han, Volume 85 - Treatise on the Dongyi

Suishō is the earliest figure in Japanese history to be named in a text and the first to have been named King of Wa. Furthermore, the term "Wakoku" also appears for the first time in relation to Suishō. These facts suggest that it was most likely during this period that the Kingdom of Wa was consolidated.

The Hou Hanshu was compiled by the Chinese scholar and historian Fan Ye and others in the 5th century CE. Even so, some believe that a powerful political force representing the Japanese state to some extent emerged at some point between the end of the 1st century and the beginning of the 2nd. However, there is little to no evidence that the Gōzoku (powerful regional families) in the regions of the Japanese archipelago had any influence on the development of a Japanese state. In any case, from this time until the end of the 7th century, the political power representing the "Yamato people" continued to refer to itself externally as "Wakoku".

After Suishō, it is said that a male lineage succeeded to the throne of Yamato, but in the late 2nd century, a large-scale conflict broke out between the various political forces within Yamato (the Great War of Yamato).

=== Wajinden and Himiko ===
This great uprising was settled when Himiko, who resided in Yamatai/Ibataikoku (see Ibataikoku), was appointed queen regnant of Japan. Himiko died in the 240s, and the next king of Japan was a male, but civil war broke out again, and the rebellion ended when another female, Taeyeo/Ichibayo (see Taiyo), became queen of Japan.

In the Records of the Three Kingdoms, Book of Wei, Biography of the Eastern Barbarians, Wajinden, there are several detailed descriptions of Emataikoku, Tsushima Province, Ichiji Province, Suerokoku, Itsukoku, Nakoku, and other provinces. It takes 20 days by water to reach Toumadai from Fumikuni, and 10 days by water and 1 month by land to reach the south from Toumadai to Yamataikuni. Queen Himiko of Yamatai-koku also paid tribute to Wei and was given the title of Wei-familial King of Wa.

After Iyo, the record of tribute to the Chinese dynasty by Wakoku was cut off for a while. According to the Kujiki, there were more than 120 Kuni-no-Miyatsu in various parts of the Japanese archipelago, forming regional states.

Among them, the kings of the Yamato kingdom, which is said to have been established by a confederation by the first half of the Kofun era in the 4th century, were known externally as "Yamato kings" or "Yamato kings," but the early Yamato kingdom was an alliance of Regional states of various powerful families and was not a despotic kingdom or dynasty. It is thought that kings of regional states sometimes referred to themselves externally as Wakoku Kings.

From the late 4th century, tribute to the Northern and Southern dynasties, such as the Eastern Jin Dynasty, was seen, and this tribute to the Southern Dynasty continued intermittently until the end of the 5th century. These were the Five kings of Wa, as described in the Book of Song, and five kings are known: San, Jin, Je, Heung, and Wu.

The king of Japan was called "King of Wako" or "King of Japan" to the dynasties of the Southern Dynasty on the continent, and domestically he was called "King" or "Okimi", as the inscription on an iron sword excavated from the Eta Funayama Kofun in Kumamoto Prefecture reads.

=== From Wa to Japan ===
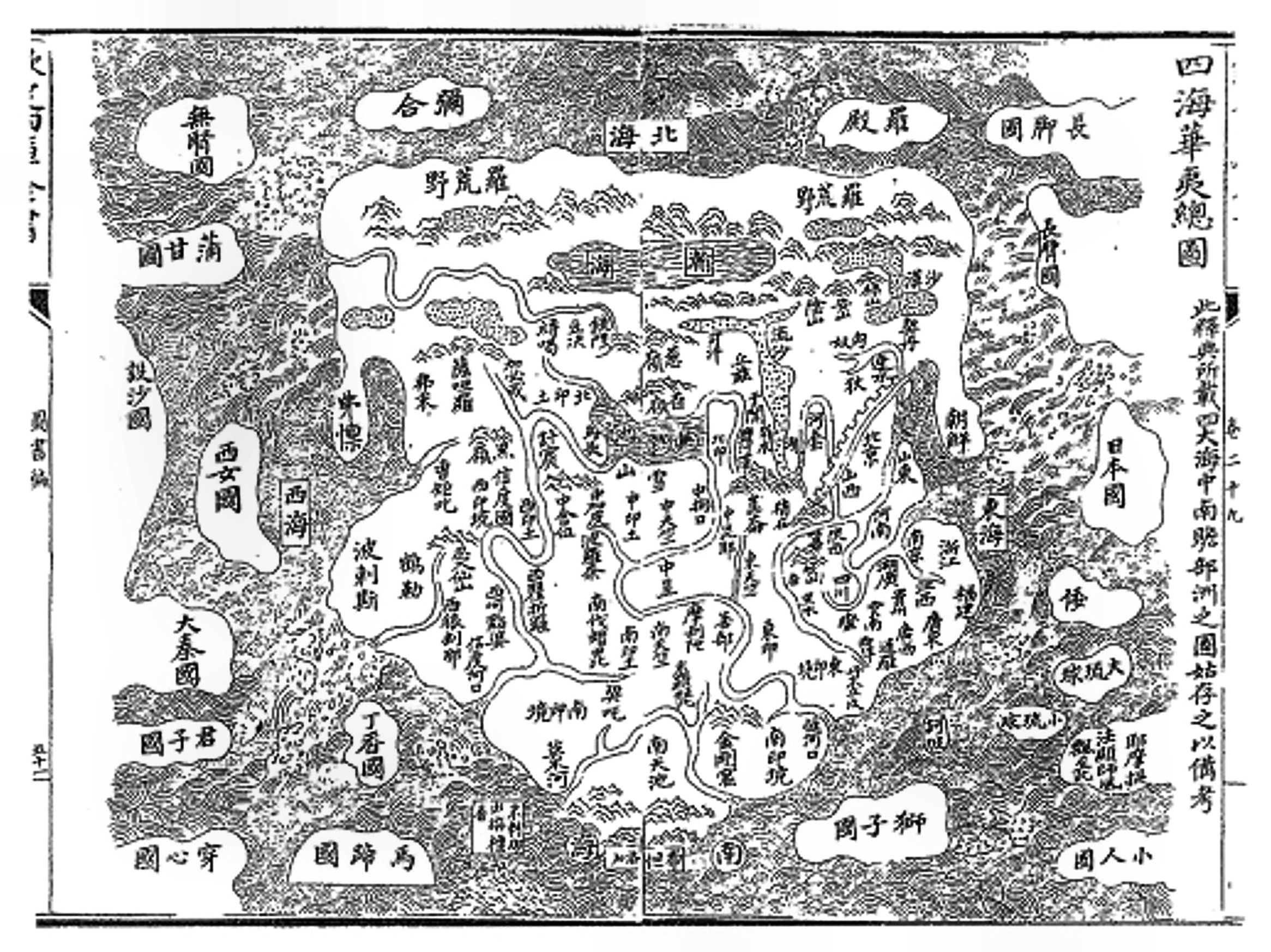
Sihai huayi zongtu (四海華夷總圖), a map of the world created in 1532. Daqin State is shown in the far west.

According to the Book of Sui, Wakoku is a country located in the southeastern part of Baekje/Silla, in the land of Sansenri. The country's territory stretches five months from east to west and three months from north to south. This information is found in the 81st volume of the Suisho Wakoku historical record, specifically in the 46th Dongyi Wakoku section.

In 607, a messenger of the Mission to Sui brought a national book to Sui. In this book, instead of using the notation "Wakoku," the country is referred to as "the place where the sun rises (日出處天子)," . This notation is simply to indicate that Wakoku is in the east, as in Buddhist scriptures of the time.

As Japan developed, the word "倭" used to refer to the country became inappropriate, and there is a theory that it was changed to "Japan" for that reason. However, the notation of the national name remained Wakoku/Wa until the latter half of the 7th century.

"Old Tang Books" Volume 199, Column 149, Dongyi, Japan, Japan
The Japanese, a different species of the Japanese, is named after Japan because its country is in Japan. Or: "The Japanese country hates its indecent name and changes it to Japan."
"New Book of Tang" Volume 220, Column 145, Dongyi, Japan
In the first year of Xianheng, He Ping Gaoli was sent as an envoy. After a while, I learned about summer sounds, evil Japanese names, and changed their names to Japan. The messenger said that he had recently come out of the country and thought it was famous. Or it said: "Japan is a small country, and it was annexed by Japanese, so it took its name."
"Song History" Volume 491 Foreign Dens Japan
The Japanese country, the Japanese slave country, is named after Japan since it came out of the country recently. Or cloud, hate its old name and change it.
"Records of the History of the Three Kingdoms" Silla Benji, December of the tenth year of King Munmu
The Japanese country has changed the name to Japan, saying that it has been published recently, and that it is famous.

When Baekje was destroyed in 660, the Japanese attempted to revive it, and the Battle of Baekgang broke out in 663 between the Tang dynasty and Silla, but they were defeated and forced to withdraw completely from the Korean peninsula. Emperor Tenmu, who won the Imjin War in 672, accelerated the construction of the Ritsuryo State, and in the process, he tried to prevent the Tang Dynasty from invading Japan by showing the Northern Tang Dynasty that Japan was a separate country from the Southern Tang Dynasty and Japan from the Southern Tang Dynasty. The compilation of the Daiho Ritsūritsu, which regulated the new state system, was almost completed at the end of the 7th century, and it is said that the country name was changed from Wa (Japan) to Japan around 701, just before the implementation of the said code. Thereafter, the central political power in the Japanese archipelago would refer to itself as Yamato.

The New Tang Book and the Old Tang Book describe the change of the country's name at this time, saying that the name "Japan" was changed to "Japan. In both books, there is also a description that "Japan, originally a small country, annexed Japan," which is generally understood to refer to the Imjin War in which Emperor Tenmu destroyed the Omi Imperial Court of Emperor Kōbun. The "K" in "K" is the first letter of the Japanese alphabet. In the Sangokushi, a history book of the Korean Peninsula, "Shilla honki", December of the 10th year of King Munmu (670), there is an article that reads, "Japan is renamed as the Japanese nation. The article states, "Japan was renamed as 'Japan' in the 10th year of King Munmu's reign (670), and was named after its proximity to the rising sun. In the New Book of Tang, it is written that Me-tarishibikō was the first emperor to have contact with China.

For a while afterwards in Japan, "Yamato" was sometimes used to refer to Japan, but around the middle of the Nara period (the Tempyō-shōhō era), "Wa" (和), which has the same pronunciation, began to be used in combination, and gradually became the predominant character. The word "Japan" was initially read as "Yamato," but eventually came to be read phonetically as "Zippon" or "Nippon," which became established around the Heian era and has continued to the present day.

== al-Wakwak ==
In the Middle Ages Islamic world, the ninth-century Ibn Khordadbeh wrote "Book of Roads and Kingdoms (Arabic: كتاب المسالك والممالك, Kitāb al-Masālik w'al-Mamālik)" and the "Story of One Thousand and One Nights" (Arabic: ألف ليلة وليلة, Kitāb alf laylah wa-laylah), and as a country east of China and India, al-Wakwak (Arabic: الواق واق, al-Wāqwāq) is mentioned as a place name, which some believe to be a reference to Japan.

== See also ==
- Wa (Japan)
- Wajin
- Yamato Kingship
- Goguryeo–Wa War
- Yayoi period
- Kofun period
- Yamatai
- Five kings of Wa
- Al-Wakwak

== Published ==
- 西嶋定生『倭国の出現』東京大学出版会、1999年。ISBN 4-130-21064-5
- 白石太一郎『日本の時代史1 倭国誕生』吉川弘文館、2002年。ISBN 4-642-00801-2

== Bibliography ==
- 岩橋小弥太『日本の国号』吉川弘文館、新装版1997年（初版1970）。ISBN 4-642-07741-3
- 岡田英弘『倭国』中央公論新社〈中公新書〉、1977年。ISBN 4-121-00482-5
- 森浩一編『日本の古代1 倭人の登場』中央公論社、1985年。ISBN 4-124-02534-3
- 田中琢『日本の歴史2 倭人争乱』集英社、1991年。ISBN 4-081-95002-4
- 井上秀雄『倭・倭人・倭国』人文書院、1991年。ISBN 4-409-52017-2
- 諏訪春雄編『倭族と古代日本』雄山閣出版、1993年。ISBN 4-639-01191-1
- 西嶋定生『邪馬台国と倭国』吉川弘文館、1994年。ISBN 4-642-07410-4
- 網野善彦『日本社会の歴史 上』岩波書店〈岩波新書〉、1997年。ISBN 4004305004
- 吉田孝『日本の誕生』岩波書店〈岩波新書〉、1997年。ISBN 4-004-30510-1
- 宮崎正勝『ジパング伝説』中央公論新社〈中公新書〉、2000年。ISBN 4121015584
- 網野善彦『日本の歴史00 「日本」とは何か』小学館、2000年。ISBN 4-062-68900-6
- 寺沢薫『日本の歴史02 王権誕生』講談社、2000年。ISBN 4-062-68902-2
- 神野志隆光『「日本」とは何か』講談社〈講談社現代新書〉、2005年。ISBN 4-061-49776-6
- 佐々木憲一「クニの首長」『古代史の基礎知識』角川書店〈角川選書〉、2005年。ISBN 4047033731
- 吉村武彦・川尻秋生「王権と国家」『古代史の基礎知識』角川書店〈角川選書〉、2005年。ISBN 4047033731
- 倉本一宏「大和王権の成立と展開」『新体系日本史1 国家史』山川出版社、2006年。ISBN 4634530104
- 松木武彦『全集日本の歴史1 列島創世記』小学館、2007年。ISBN 4-096-22101-5
