= Eboshijima Lighthouse =

Eboshijima Lighthouse Ebosi Sima 烏帽子島灯台
- Location: Eboshijima; Itoshima, Fukuoka; Japan
- Coordinates: 33°41′23″N 129°58′57″E

Tower
- Constructed: 1 August 1875 (first)
- Construction: concrete tower
- Height: 16 metres (52 ft)
- Shape: cylindrical tower with balcony and lantern
- Markings: white tower
- Operator: Karatsu Coast Guard Office

Light
- First lit: 1975 (current)
- Focal height: 56 metres (184 ft)
- Intensity: 80,000 cd
- Range: 20 nautical miles (37 km; 23 mi)
- Characteristic: Fl W 15s.
- Japan no.: JCG-5859

Eboshijima Lighthouse (烏帽子島灯台, eboshijima tōdai) is an unmanned lighthouse in Eboshijima, a tiny island administered by Itoshima, Fukuoka, Japan. The island is in Karatsu Bay.

== History ==
This lighthouse was one of those designed by Richard Henry Brunton, who was hired by the government of Japan in the Meiji period to help construct lighthouses to make it safe for foreign ships to come to Japan following the opening of Japan to the West. Work began in June 1873. It was first lit on 1 August 1875; 149 years ago.

== See also ==
- List of lighthouses in Japan
