= The legend of Himiko =

Shamaness-queen of Yamatai-koku in Wakoku

Himiko(卑弥呼 c. 170–247/248 AD), a shamaness-queen of Yamatai-koku in Wakoku sitting on the throne at the age of 20. Himiko was the kind of Queen everyone would love, but everything changed once she came to power. Himiko had and still has many, many names, but the names aren't quite what the legend about her says, it is worse than anything ever imaginable.

=== The Legend ===
Himiko was young when she first came to power, and she was nice, polite and generous to everyone before she came to power in 190(AD). The tales said about her was that she had something called the devil’s touch. The devil's touch is a decaying disease which decays the touched body slowly. While being Queen she gained so much power that most people will never even experience or witness. The land of Japan was in danger as Himiko was invading other provinces from China, Korea and Japan itself, the land she was already leading. After Himiko died the curse lived inside her dead body.

=== The devil's touch ===
The devil's touch is a curse applied to a person who hates, has greed, wants more power, control and even sexual greed. The curse decays the applied soul's body and energy. There is no way to get rid of it, no way to just ignore it. The person decays, slowly, no matter what the person does. If the person commits suicide, the curse still lives and carries on. The curse never stops, it keeps moving to the person's successor, children, parents, friends etc.
