= Eboshijima =

Small Japanese island

Coordinates: 33°40′59″N 129°58′59″E

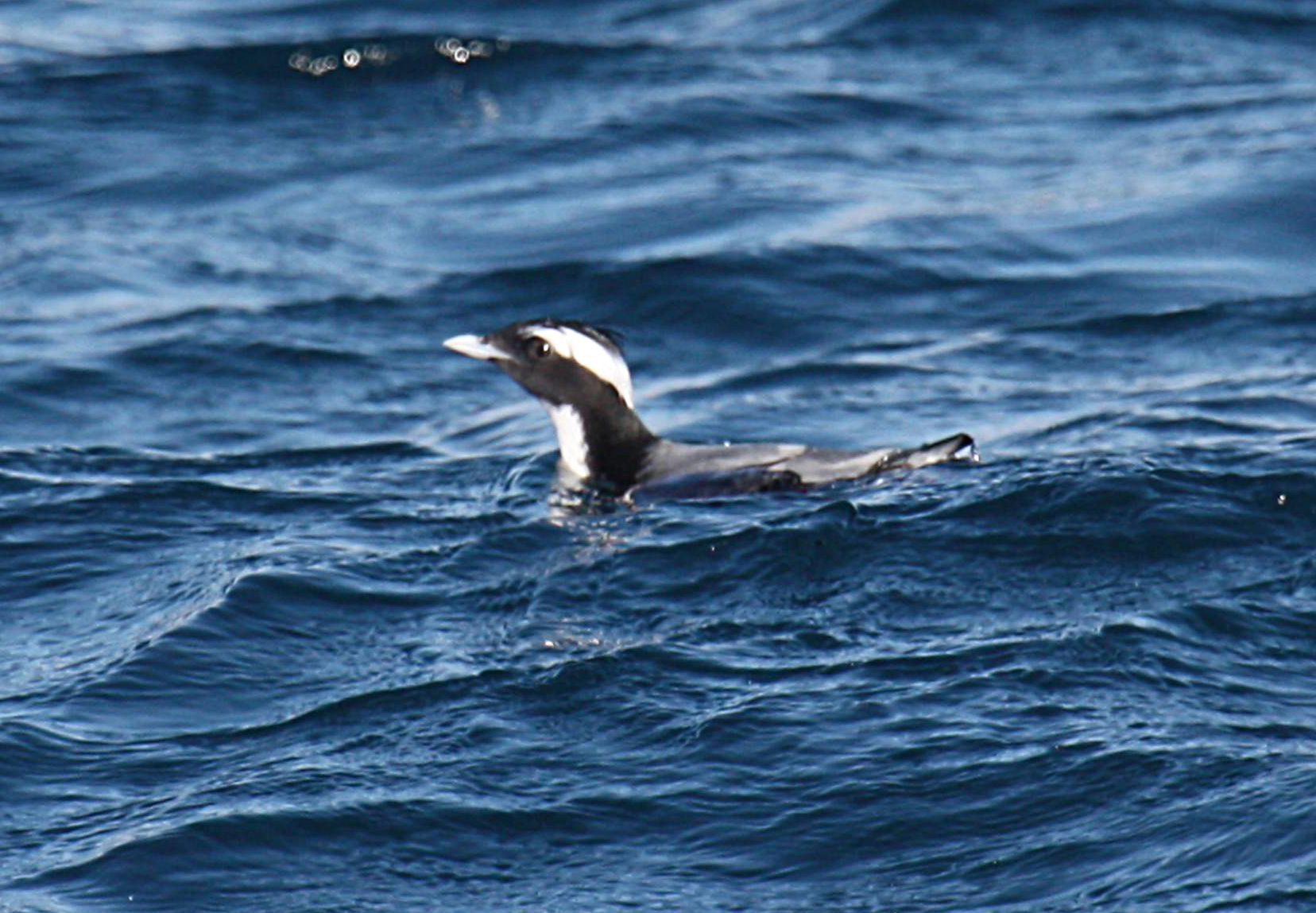
Japanese murrelets breed on Eboshijima

Eboshijima is a tiny (1 ha) island in Karatsu Bay, north-west of the Itoshima peninsula in Fukuoka Prefecture, Japan. Although uninhabited, it is the location of the unmanned Eboshijima Lighthouse. The islet is composed of rocky reefs surrounded by cliffs. It has been recognised as an Important Bird Area (IBA) by BirdLife International because it supports a population of Japanese murrelets which nest in cracks in the rocks.
