= Shito Dolmen Cluster =

- 志登支石墓群 (Japanese)
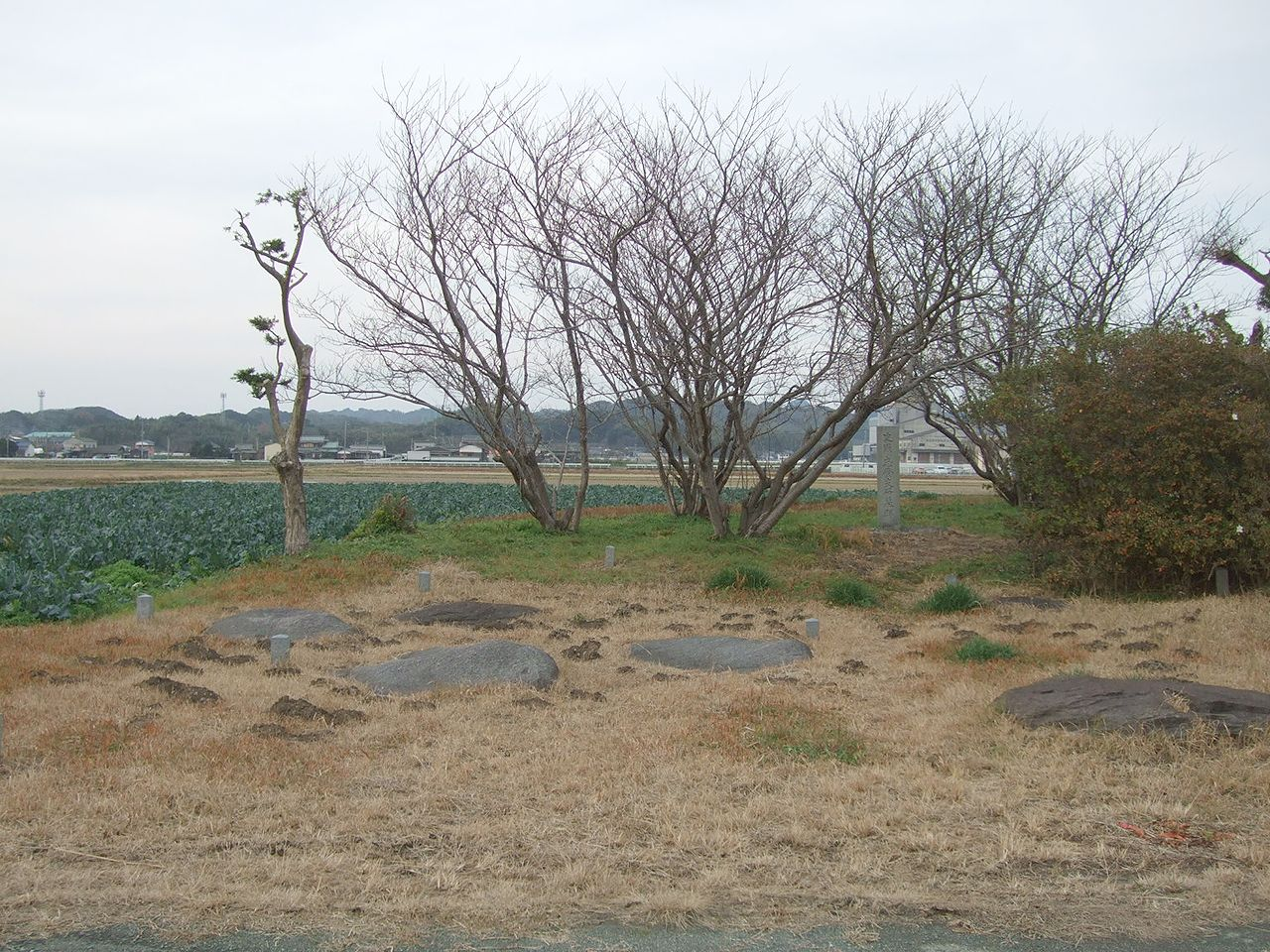
- Shito Dolmen Cluster

- Shito Dolmen Cluster Shito Dolmen Cluster (Japan)
- Interactive map of Shito Dolmen Cluster
- 33°34′9.2″N 130°13′4.1″E
- Periods: Yayoi period
- Location: Itoshima, Fukuoka, Japan
- Region: Kyushu

History
- Built: c.2nd century BC

Site notes
- Public access: Yes (museum)

The Shito Dolmen Cluster (志登支石墓群) is an archaeological site with a Yayoi period cemetery containing numerous dolmens, located in the city of Itoshima, Fukuoka Prefecture Japan. The site was designated a National Historic Site of Japan in 1954.

== Overview ==
The Shito Dolmen Cluster is located on a slightly elevated area in the alluvial plain on the left bank of the Zuibaiji River, which flows through the Itoshima Plain that extends to the west of the Fukuoka Plain, at the base of the Itoshima Peninsula that juts out into the Genkai Sea. It consists of ten dolmens lined up at intervals of one to two meters apart, about one meter higher in elevation than the surrounding paddy fields. The site was discovered in 1952, and during archaeological excavations the following year, eight burials were confirmed. Stone pillars support a flat or tortoise-shaped cap stone made of basalt or granite with a diameter of 1.5 to 2 meters and thickness of about 50-cm. The lower structure is a rectangular stone enclosure made of block stones, with a jar burial in a shallow earthen pit underneath. Grave goods included six obsidian stone arrowheads and four willow leaf-shaped polished stone arrowheads, thought to be made in the Korean Peninsula. These graves are estimated to date from the early to middle Yayoi period. The excavated artifacts are stored at the Itokoku History Museum.

The site is approximately a 15-minute walk from Hatae Station on the JR Kyushu Chikuhi Line.

== See also ==
- List of Historic Sites of Japan (Fukuoka)
