= Sone Sites =

Historic site in Itoshima, Fukuoka, Japan

Sone Site
- 曽根遺跡群 (Japanese)
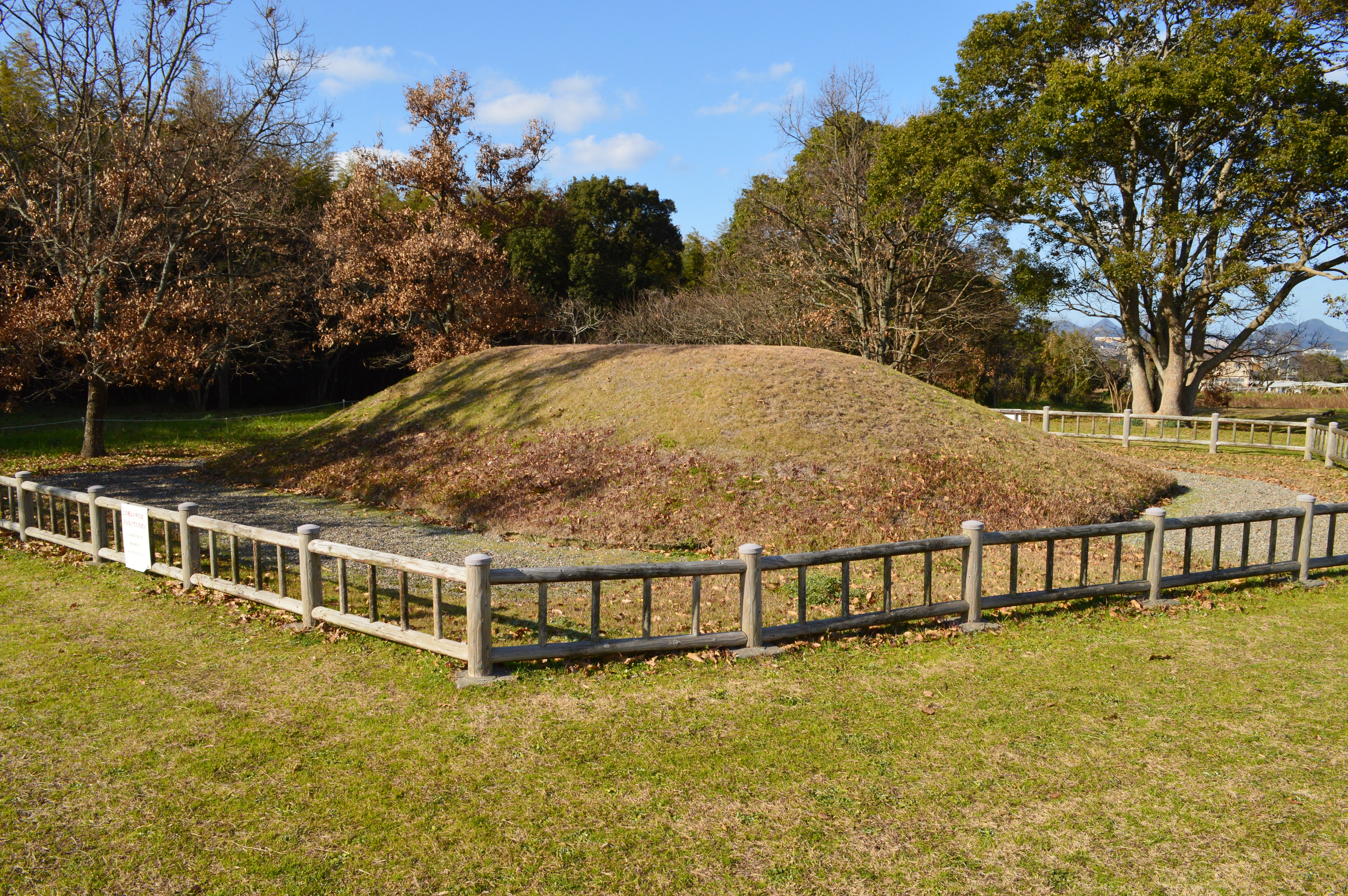
- Hirabaru Tomb No.1 at the Sone Site

- Sone Site Sone Sites (Japan)
- Interactive map of Sone Site
- 33°32′32.3″N 130°13′42.3″E
- Periods: Yayoi period
- Location: Itoshima, Fukuoka, Japan
- Region: Kyushu

History
- Built: 1st century

Site notes
- Public access: Yes (park)

The Sone Site (曽根遺跡群) is a group of Yayoi period burial mounds, located in the Sone and Arita neighborhoods of the city of Itoshima, Fukuoka Prefecture, Japan. The site was designated a National Historic Site of Japan in 1982, with the area under protection expanded in 2000.

== Hirabaru Site ==
The Hirabaru Site (平原遺跡) consists of three square moated burial mounds and two circular moated burial mounds. In January 1965, Tomb No. 1 was discovered by chance during the reclamation of a mandarin orange orchard. From 1988 to 1999, the investigation area was expanded and four more burial mounds were discovered. This site is now known as "Hirahara Historical Park", but only Tomb No. 1 has been restored. This burial mound is about 14 meters east-to-west and 10.5 meters north-to-south, surrounded by a moat about two meters wide. It is thought to have been built around the end of the Yayoi period.

Archaeological excavations of Tomb No.1 found traces of a three-meter long split bamboo-shaped wooden coffin, and grave goods included many fragments of bronze mirrors made in Japan and China, which were restored to 40 pieces, including five Large flower mirrors with a diameter of 46.5 cm, with a floral pattern on the inside. One of these large mirrors is on display at the Kyushu National Museum, and the other four at the Itokoku History Museum. This is the largest number of bronze mirrors excavated from a single tomb in Japan (as of 2009). The size, shape and age of the mirrors has prompted speculation that the Yata no Kagami, one of the Imperial Regalia of Japan now kept at Ise Grand Shrine may be of the same type. Other artifacts included agate tubular beads, and a large amount of glass products, and the grave goods from this tumulus were collectively designated as a National Treasure in 2006. As no weapons were found among the grave goods, it is believed that the person buried in this tomb was a woman. Traces of post holes surrounding the burial pit indicate that it was one covered by a large raised-floor gabled warehouse building with a ridge pillar seen in paintings on Yayoi pottery or embossed into dōtaku bronze bells. The unprecedented number of bronze mirrors indicates someone of extremely high status, and thus proponents of the theory that Yamataikoku was located in Kyushu support the premise that this tumulus is the grave of Himiko.

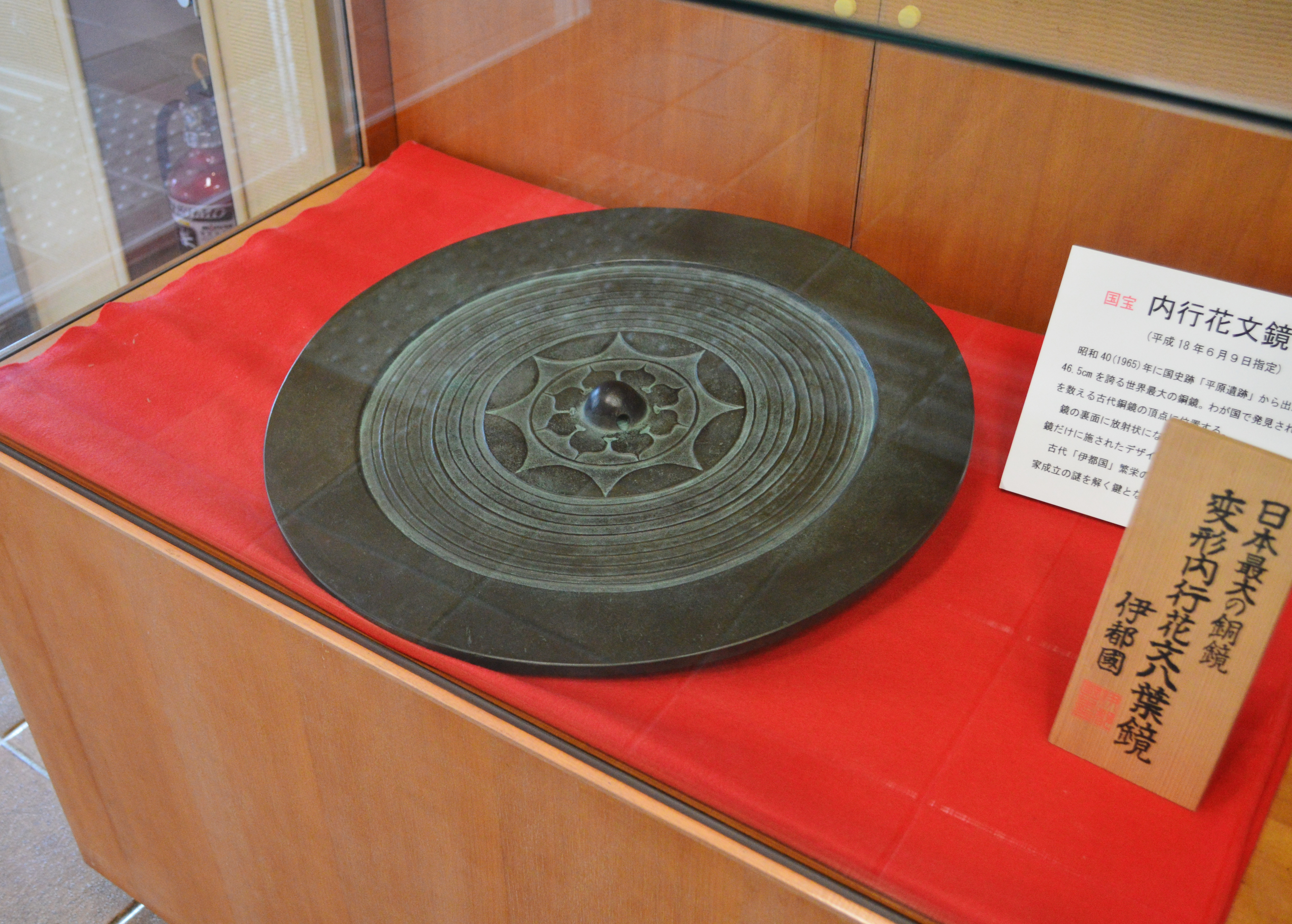
Large flower mirror from the Hirabaru Kofun, NT

== Warezuka Kofun ==
The Warezuka Kofun (ワレ塚古墳) is a zenpō-kōen-fun (前方後円墳), which is shaped like a keyhole, having one square end and one circular end, when viewed from above. It built in the middle of the Kofun period. Its dimensions are approximately 43 meters in length, with the circular mound at the rear approximately 29 meters in diameter and 4.5 meters in height, and the front approximately 15 meters in length and 0.6 meters in height. The circular mound is built in three tiers, and was covered with fukiishi roofing stones. There are traces of a moat surrounding it. The tumulus has not been excavated, so details of its burial chamber or grave goods are unknown. It is located in the center of the Sone Hills.

== Zengamezuka Kofun ==
The Zengamezuka Kofun (銭瓶塚古墳) is also a zenpō-kōen-fun keyhole-shaped tumulus thought to have been built in the middle of the Kofun period. Its dimensions are approximately 50 meters in length, with the circular rear part measuring approximately 37 meters in diameter, 5 meters in height, and 16 meters in length in the front part. The circular rear part is built in three tiers, and part of the tumulus was destroyed during the construction of a road. It is thought that there was a moat approximately 6 meters wide around the tumulus, and morning glory-shaped haniwa, cylindrical haniwa, and figurative haniwa have been unearthed during excavations in the moat. It has not been excavated. It is located in the center of the Sone Hills.

== Kitsunezuka Kofun ==
The Kitsunezuka Kofun (狐塚古墳) is an enpun (円墳)-style circular tomb is thought to have been built in the middle of the Kofun period. It is built in three tiers, is 33 meters in diameter and 4 meters high, and has a surrounding moat 6 to 10 meters wide. Inside is a horizontal stone burial chamber 2.6 meters long and 1.65 meters wide, divided into four sections, with a paved floor, but it is considerably damaged. Grave goods excavated include five knives, one iron axe, and two iron arrowheads. It is located at the eastern end of the Sone Hills.

The site is approximately 3.3 kilometers south of Hatae Station on the JR Kyushu Chikuhi Line.

== See also ==
- List of Historic Sites of Japan (Fukuoka)
