= Itoshimakōkō-mae Station =

Railway station in Itoshima, Fukuoka Prefecture, Japan

JK 07 Itoshima-Kokomae Station 糸島高校前駅
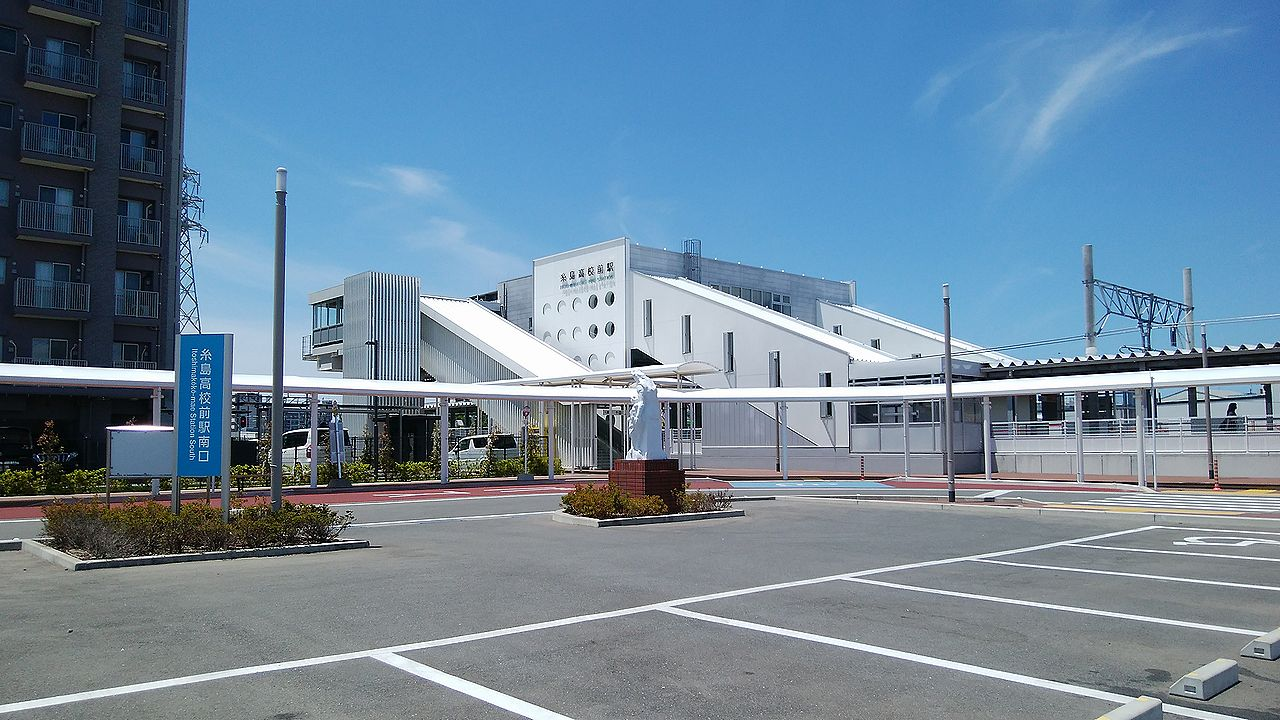
- Itoshima-Kokomae Station, July 2021

General information
- Location: Urashi, Itoshima-shi, Fukuoka-ken 819-1112; Japan
- Coordinates: 33.5607°N 130.2133°E
- Operator: JR Kyushu
- Line: JK Chikuhi Line
- Distance: 11.3 km from Meinohama
- Platforms: 2 side platforms
- Tracks: 2

Construction
- Structure type: At grade

Other information
- Status: Staffed (Midori no Madoguchi )
- Station code: JK-07
- Website: Official website

History
- Opened: 16 March 2019; 7 years ago

Passengers
- FY2020: 1471 daily
- Rank: 100th (among JR Kyushu stations)

Services
Preceding station	JR Kyushu	Following station
Chikuzen-Maebaru towards Nishi-Karatsu	Chikuhi Line Local	Hatae towards Meinohama
Location
- Location within Fukuoka Prefecture Location within Japan

Itoshima-Kokomae Station (糸島高校前駅, Itoshima-Kōkōmae-eki) is a passenger railway station located in the city of Itoshima, Fukuoka, Japan. It is operated by Kyushu Railway Company (JR Kyushu). Named after the nearby Itoshima High School, the station opened on March 16, 2019.

== Lines ==
Itoshima-Kōkōmae Station is served by the Chikuhi Line and is located 11.3 km from the starting point of the line at Meinohama.

== Station layout ==
The station has two side platforms serving a double track line. The elevated station building is located above the platforms, and are connected to them via stairs and elevators. The station has a Midori no Madoguchi staffed ticket office.

=== Platforms ===
1	■ JK Chikuhi Line	for Tenjin and Hakata
2	■ JK Chikuhi Line	for Chikuzen-Maebaru, Karatsu and Nishi-Karatsu

== History ==
The proposed station was initially given the provisional name of Urashi New Station (浦志新駅), but a request to have the station named Itoshima-Kokomae was submitted by the City of Itoshima to JR Kyushu in July 2017. Construction of the new station started in 2017, and the station was opened on March 16, 2019.

== Passenger statistics ==
In fiscal 2020, the station was used by an average of 1471 passengers daily (boarding passengers only), and it ranked 100th among the busiest stations of JR Kyushu.

== Surrounding area ==
- Itoshima High School

== See also ==
- List of railway stations in Japan
