= Raizan Kōgoishi =

Castle ruins in Itoshima, Fukuoka, Japan

Raizan Kōgoishi'
- 雷山神籠石
- Itoshima, Fukuoka, Japan
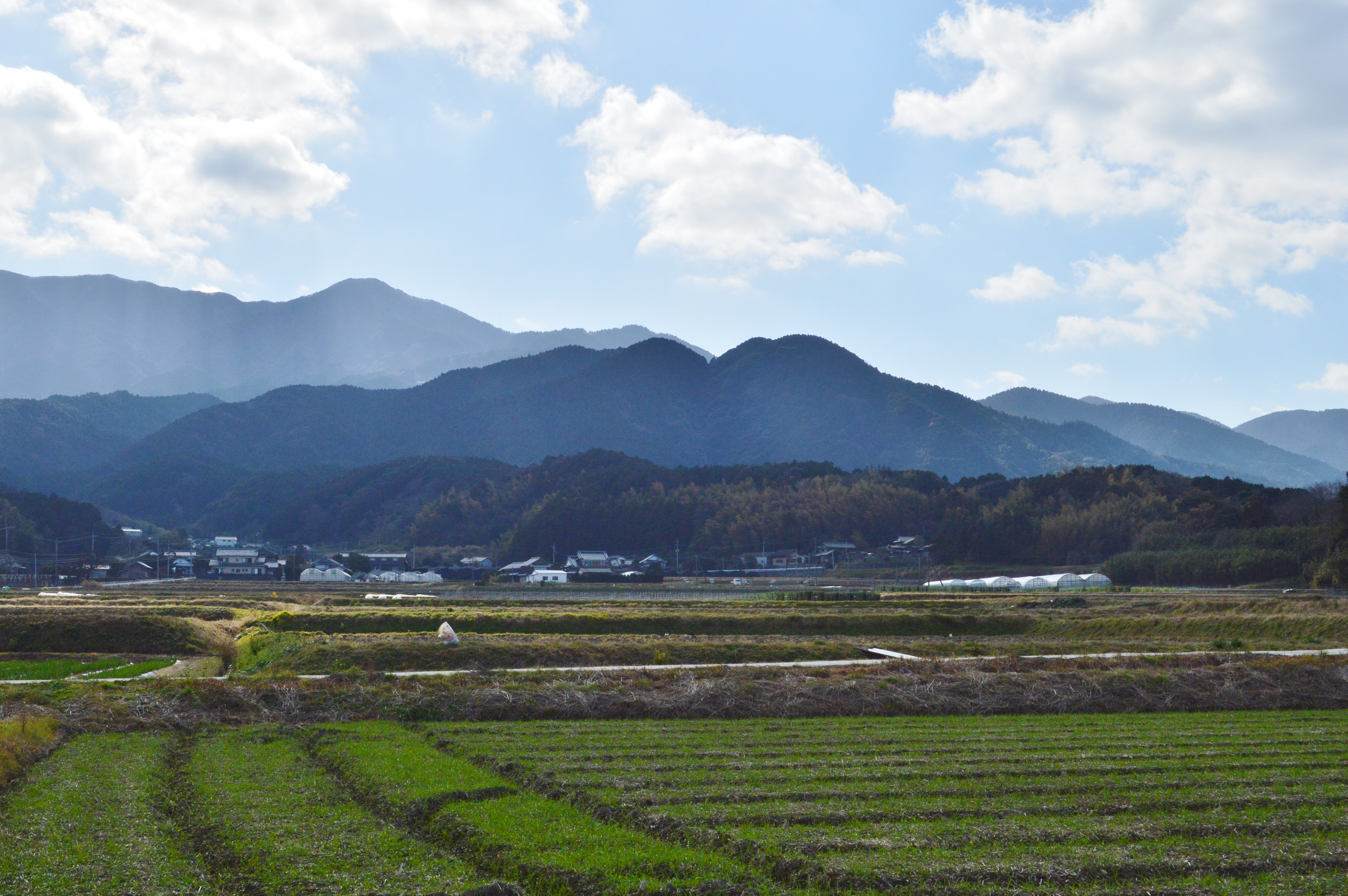
- Mount Raizan

Site information
- Type: Korean-style fortress
- Condition: Ruins

Site history
- Built: c.660s
- Built by: Yamato court
- In use: Asuka period
- Raizan Kōgoishi (Fukuoka Prefecture) Raizan Kōgoishi (Japan) National Historic Site of Japan

Raizan Kōgoishi (雷山神籠石) was an ancient castle (also known as a Korean-style fortresses in Japan (朝鮮式山城, Chōsen-shiki yamajiro) located in the city of Itoshima, Fukuoka Prefecture Japan. Its ruins have been protected as a National Historic Site since 1932.

== History ==
After the defeat of the combined Baekje and Yamato Japan forces, at the hands of the Silla and Tang China alliance at the Battle of Hakusukinoe in 663, the Yamato court feared an invasion from either or both Tang or Silla. In response, a huge network of shore fortifications was constructed throughout the rest of the 600s, often with the assistance of Baekje engineers, generals and artisans. Unaware of the outbreak of the Silla-Tang War (670–676), the Japanese would continue to build fortifications until 701, even after finding out that Silla was no longer friendly with Tang. The name "kōgoishi" means "stones of divine protection," a name given them by the Meiji period archaeologist Tsuboi Shōgorō, who conjectured that they served as spiritual or practical protection for sacred sites. Scholars after Tsuboi determined that the structures are most likely the remains of practical, military fortifications, and were unlikely to have significant spiritual connections, although much remains unknown about these structures and there is very little contemporary documentary evidence.

The Raizan Kōgoishi is located on the northern slopes of 955-meter Mount Raizan, one of the Sefuri Mountains forming the border between Fukuoka and Saga Prefecture. It is located at an elevation of between 400 and 480 meters above sea level, and is estimated to be about 300 meters from east-to-west and 700 meters from-north to-south. As it is located on a ridge that juts out north from Mount Raizan, it offers a panoramic view of the Itoshima Peninsula, as well as Hakata Bay and the Genkai Sea. It was built with castle walls blocking two valleys (approximately 730 meters apart), north and south. In most Kōgoishi, the fortifications surround the peak of the mountain, but Raizan Kōgoishi is unique in that the castle area does not include the mountain peak, and the castle wall crosses the same valley twice.

The ruins include water gates built on the north and south sides of the valley, and a group of stones extending east and west from the water gates. At the south water gate, there are two types of sluice gates: one is a culvert installed at the bottom of the stone rows, and the other is a water gutter installed in a part of the stone embankment, from which water flows. The north water gate is a strong structure made of cut stones piled up 12 meters long, 10 meters wide, and 3 meters high. From both the east and west ends of the water gate, the rows of stones open out in the shape of a letter "C" and climb up a steep slope toward the top of the ridge. In addition, two breaks in the stone rows that are presumed to be castle gate ruins have been found near the south water gate.

Regarding the date of construction, the fortification is not mentioned in any ancient literature, so its name, construction date, etc. are all uncertain. The current name of the fortification is after the name of the mountain, which is mentioned in the Nihon Shoki and Man'yōshū, but with no mention of fortifications. However, mention is made of an "Inazumi Castle" in the 699 AD entry of the Shoku Nihongi and as the location of that castle remains unknown, there is a theory that this entry could be referring to the Raizan Kōgoishi. Based on the construction technique and similarities with other known Kōgoishi sites, the most likely theory is that it was built in the middle of the 7th century.

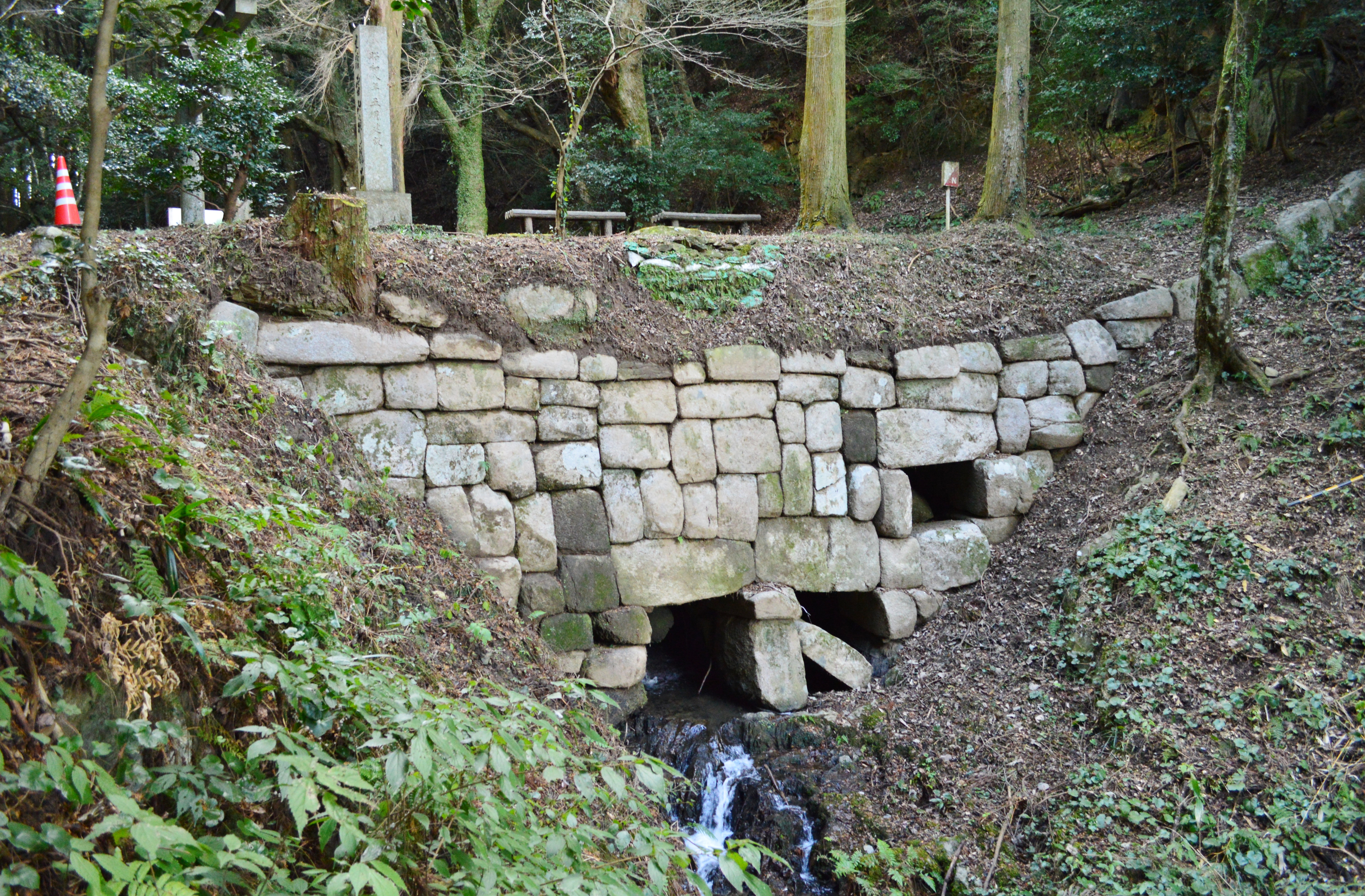
North Water Gate

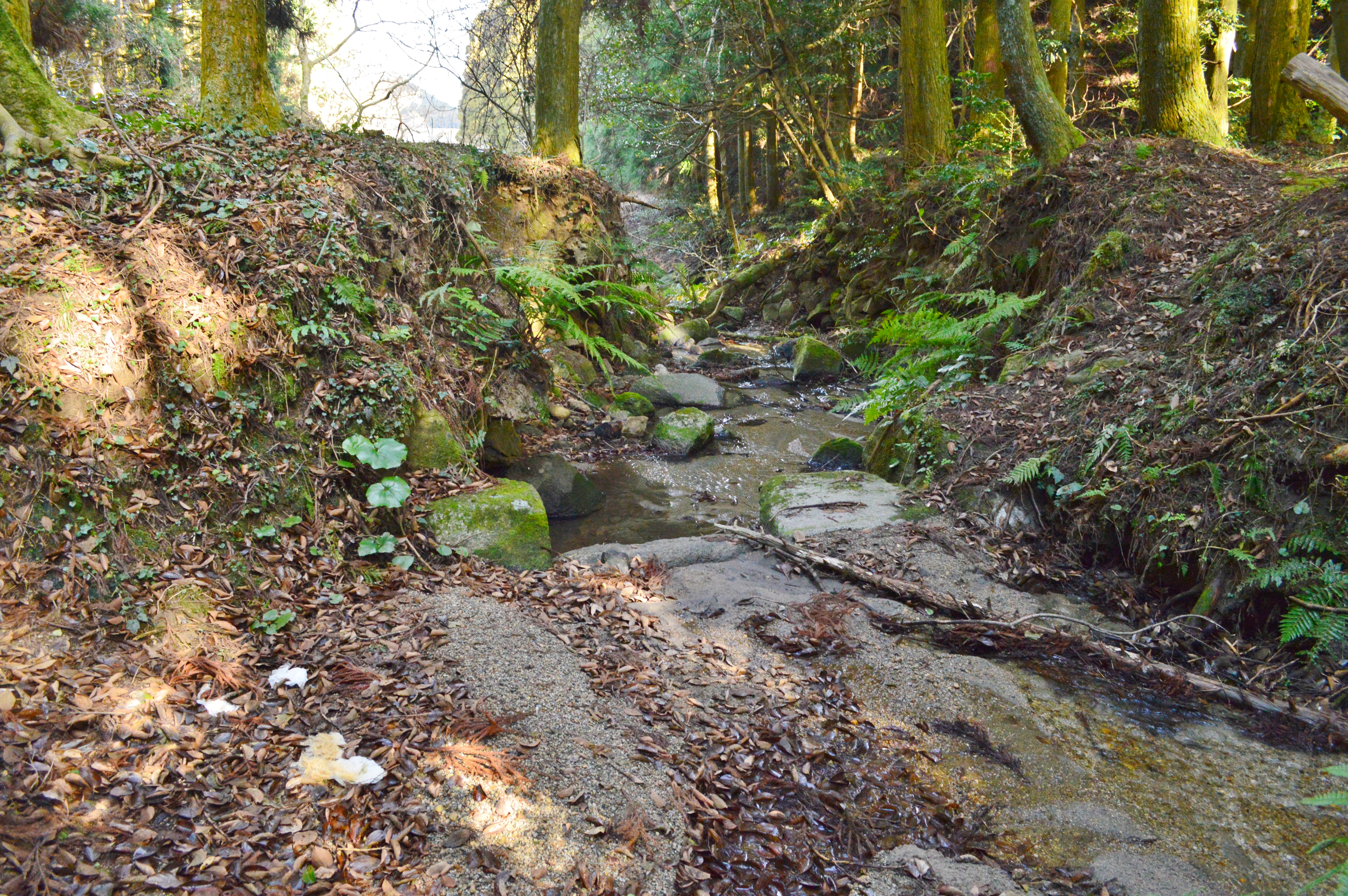
South Water Gate

== See also ==
- List of Historic Sites of Japan (Fukuoka)
- List of foreign-style castles in Japan
- Kōgoishi

== Literature ==
- De Lange, William (2021). An Encyclopedia of Japanese Castles. Groningen: Toyo Press. pp. 600 pages. ISBN 978-9492722300.
