= Ryuji Ichioka =

Japanese baseball player (born 1991)

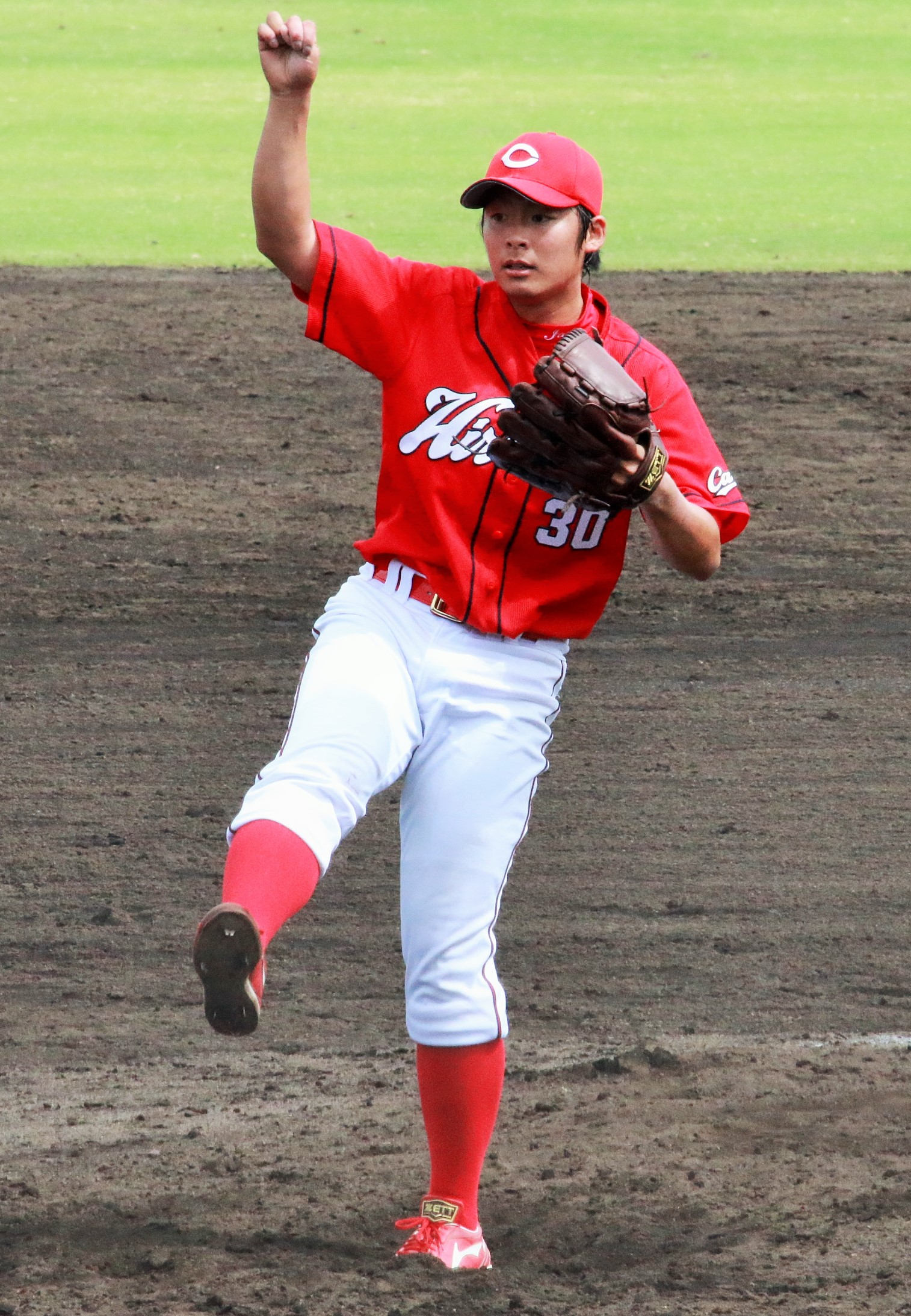
- Ichioka with the Hiroshima Toyo Carp
- Pitcher
- Born: January 11, 1991 (age 35); Itoshima, Fukuoka, Japan
- Batted: Right Threw: Right

NPB debut
- May 16, 2012, for the Yomiuri Giants

Last NPB appearance
- 2023, for the Hiroshima Toyo Carp

NPB statistics
- Win–loss record: 17–14
- Earned run average: 2.76
- Strikeouts: 253
- Saves: 7
- Stats at Baseball Reference

Teams
- Yomiuri Giants (2012–2013); Hiroshima Toyo Carp (2014–2020, 2022–2023)

Career highlights and awards
- 1× NPB All-Star (2014)

Ryuji Ichioka (一岡 竜司, Ichioka Ryuji; born January 11, 1991 in Itoshima, Fukuoka, Japan) is a former professional Japanese baseball player. He plays pitcher for the Hiroshima Toyo Carp.
