= Itokoku History Museum =

- 伊都国歴史博物館
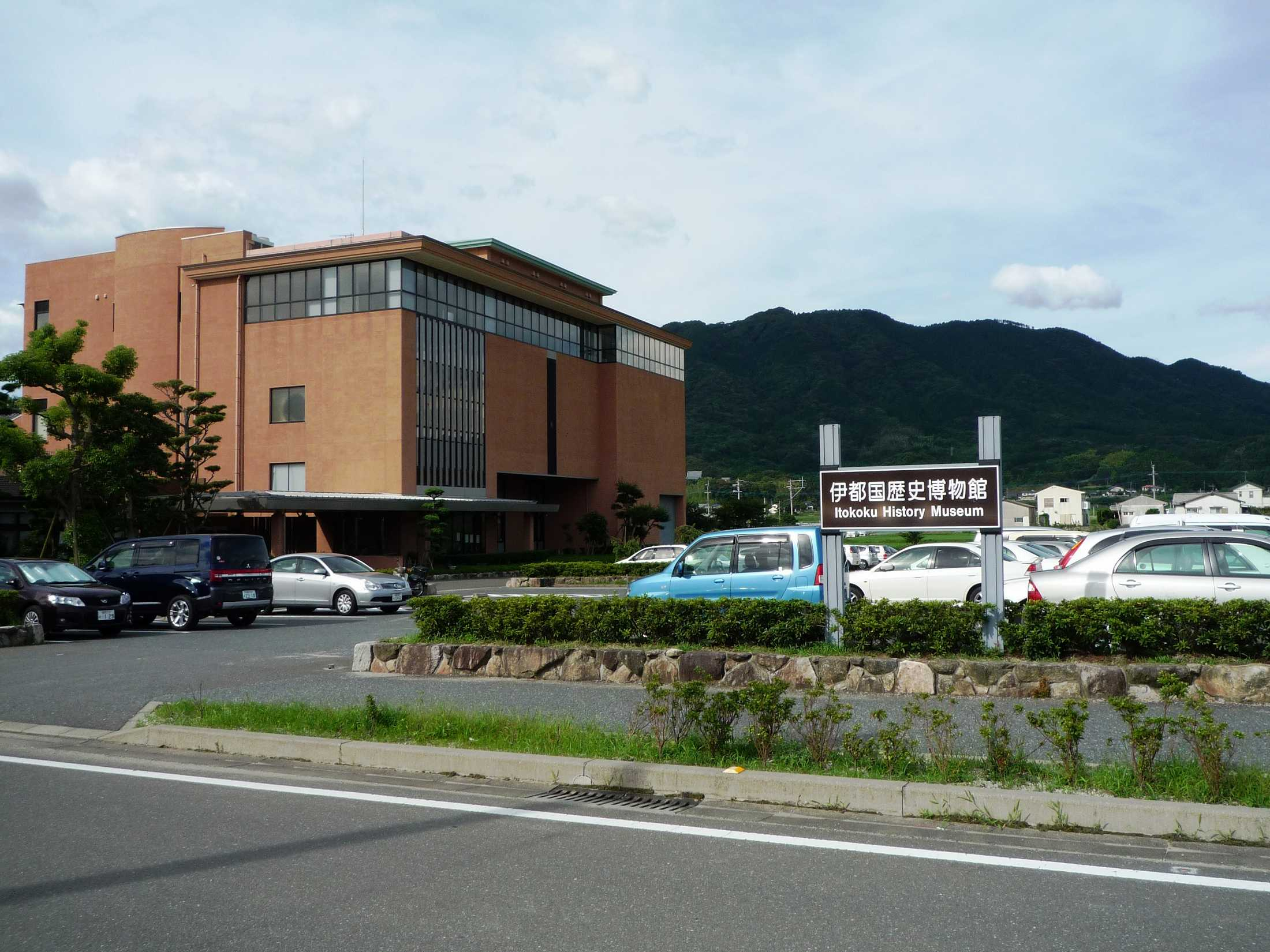
- Interactive map of the Itokoku History Museum area

General information
- Location: 916 Iwara, Itoshima, Fukuoka Prefecture, Japan
- Coordinates: 33°32′12″N 130°15′06″E
- Opened: 29 October 2004

Technical details
- Floor count: 4
- Floor area: 1,108.28 square metres (11,929.4 sq ft) (exhibition space)

Website
- Official website

Itokoku History Museum (伊都国歴史博物館, Ito-koku Rekishi Hakubutsukan) opened in Itoshima, Fukuoka Prefecture, Japan in 2004. It supersedes the former Ito Historical Museum (伊都歴史資料館), which opened in July 1987. With a focus on cultural properties excavated from the area, the museum's collection numbers some 19,500 objects. The display includes an assemblage of Yayoi-period artefacts excavated from the Hirabaru burial site (平原遺跡) that has been designated a National Treasure.

== See also ==
- List of National Treasures of Japan (archaeological materials)
- Kyushu Historical Museum
- List of Historic Sites of Japan (Fukuoka)
- Itokoku
