= Nishi-nippon Junior College =

Coordinates: 33.5981°N 130.3669°E

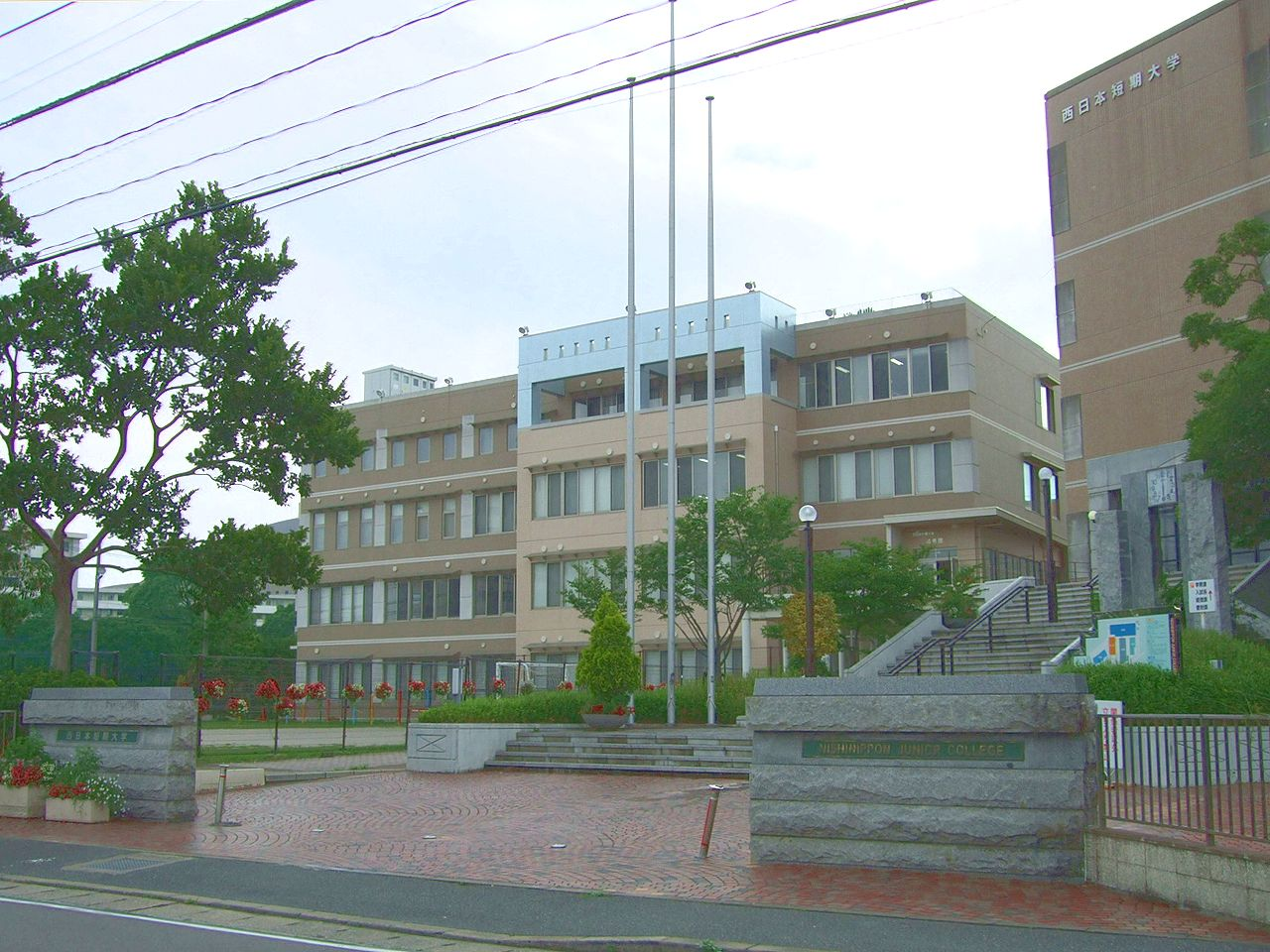
Nishinippon Junior College

Nishi-nippon Junior College (西日本短期大学, Nishi-nippon tanki daigaku) is a private junior college in Fukuoka, Fukuoka, Japan, established in 1957. The predecessor of the school, a juku, was founded in 1948. The present name was adopted in 1959.
