= Shinmachi Dolmen Cluster =

Archaeological site in Japan

- 新町支石墓群 (Japanese)
- Shinmachi Dolmen Cluster Shinmachi Dolmen Cluster (Japan)
- Interactive map of Shinmachi Dolmen Cluster
- 33°34′12″N 130°08′01″E
- Periods: Yayoi period
- Location: Itoshima, Fukuoka, Japan
- Region: Kyushu

History
- Built: c. 2nd century BC

Site notes
- Public access: Yes (museum)

The Shinmachi Dolmen Cluster (新町支石墓群) is an archaeological site with a Yayoi period cemetery containing numerous dolmens, located in the city of Itoshima, Fukuoka Prefecture Japan. The site was designated a National Historic Site of Japan in 2000.

== Overview ==
The Shinmachi Dolmen Cluster is located on the southwest side of the Itoshima Peninsula facing the Genkai Sea, on a sand dune facing Hikizu Bay. This site has been known since the early twentieth century, but a full-scale archaeological excavation was carried out until 1986. The site is a complex one, including shell middens from the late Jōmon period, the Mitoko Matsubara settlement ruins from the Yayoi Period where coins have been found, and box-style sarcophagus graves from the early Kofun period. The National Historic Site designation covers a cluster of dolmens and wooden coffin graves in a cemetery from the early Yayoi Period. As a result of several range confirmation surveys, the known extent of the grave area has expanded, and at the foot of the sand dunes on the south side, it extends for about 80 meters (260 ft) north–south and about 140 meters (460 ft) east–west. A total of 57 dolmens and grave sites were identified, including seven dolmens with the upper stone in its original position and ten dolmens without the upper stone. Approximately one-third of the 57 graves were dolmens. Similar dolmens have been found in the Korean Peninsula. About half of the graves were excavated, and half of these contained small pots. In addition, a total of 14 sets of human bones were excavated, and it appears that infants were buried in jar coffins and adults in wooden coffins. The human bones showed characteristics typical of the Jōmon people, such as a short face and short stature, and Jōmon-style tooth extraction was commonly observed.

Two tombs, No. 9 and No. 11, which have almost the same structure and size, have been completely excavated. Tomb No. 9 has a granite upper stone weighing approximately one ton supported by four dolmens, and the grave shaft is rectangular with a length of 180-cm, a width of 65-cm, and a depth of 60-cm. A human skeleton was discovered with knees in a slightly bent position. Judging from this burial posture and the presence of stones on all sides of the bottom of the earthen pit, which are believed to be coffin stands, it is thought that a wooden coffin was used to bury the remains.

In Tomb No. 24, the human remains of a middle-aged man were discovered with a Korean willow leaf-shaped polished stone arrowhead stuck in his left femur, sandwiched between four stones that appeared to be the backfill of a wooden coffin. It is speculated that he died in a battle during the early Yayoi period, and the find was widely described in popular media as the "first casualty of war in the Japanese archipelago". Directly below these remains was a small earthen pit in which the head of another person (only the teeth were found) was buried. It is further speculated that this was the head of the person killed by the man in battle. Currently, a roof has been placed over this tomb, and the adjacent Shinmachi Ruins Exhibition Hall (新町遺跡展示館) displays some of the opened graves in situ as well as artifacts found at the site.

== See also ==
- List of Historic Sites of Japan (Fukuoka)
