= Hatae Station =

Railway station in Itoshima, Fukuoka Prefecture, Japan

JK 06 Hatae Station 波多江駅
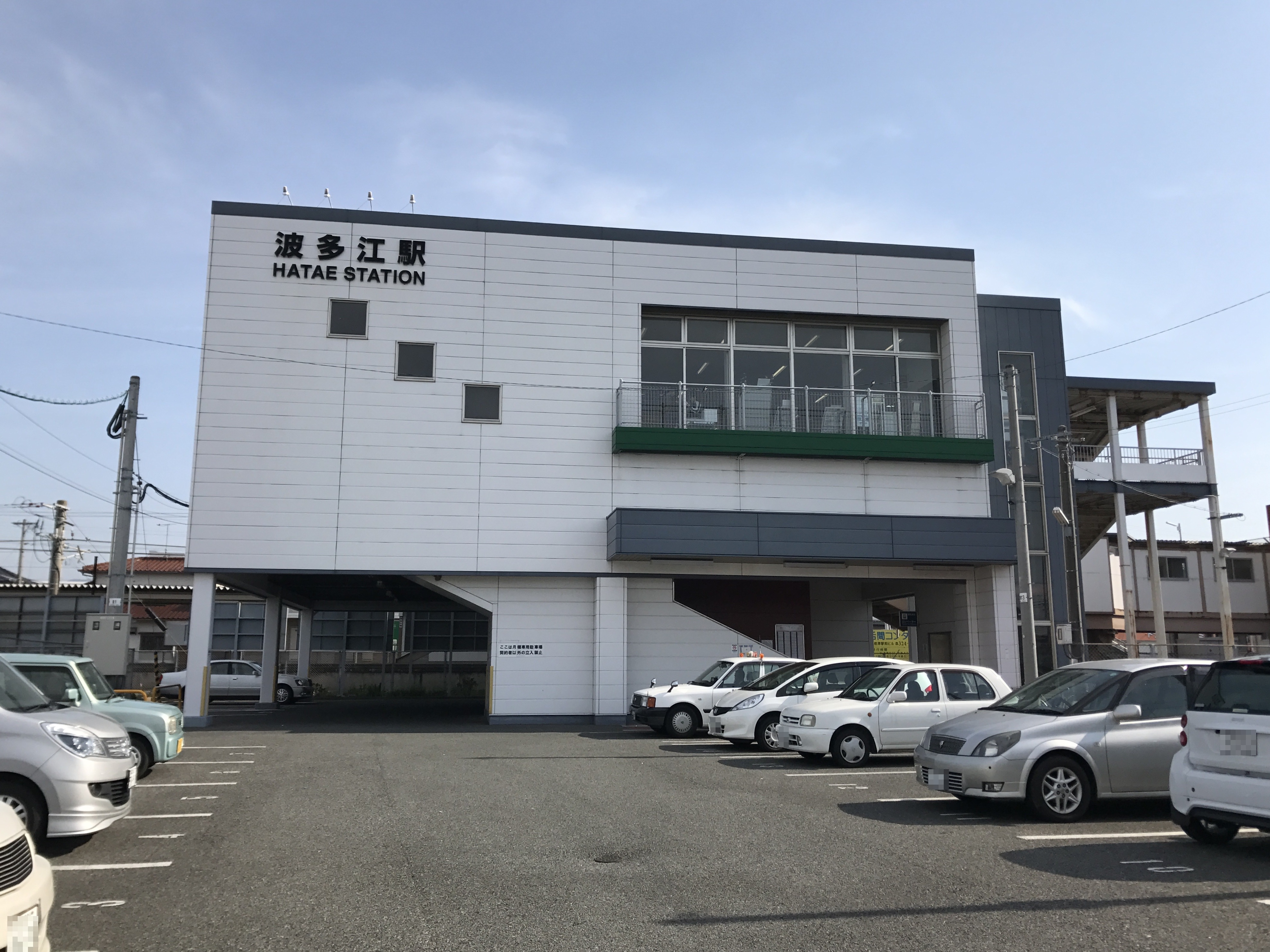
- Hatae Station in April 2017

General information
- Location: 4 Chome-3 Hataeekikita, Itoshima-shi, Fukuoka-ken 819-1107; Japan
- Coordinates: 33.5639°N 130.2265°E
- Operator: JR Kyushu
- Line: JK Chikuhi Line
- Distance: 10.1 km from Meinohama
- Platforms: 1 island platform
- Tracks: 2

Construction
- Structure type: At grade
- Parking: Available
- Accessible: Yes - platforms served by elevators

Other information
- Status: Staffed ticket window (Midori no Madoguchi) (outsourced)
- Website: Official website

History
- Opened: 1 July 1928
- Rebuilt: 2010; 16 years ago

Passengers
- FY2020: 1920 daily
- Rank: 76th (among JR Kyushu stations)

Services
Preceding station	JR Kyushu	Following station
Itoshimakōkō-mae towards Nishi-Karatsu	Chikuhi Line Local	Susenji towards Meinohama
Location
- Location within Fukuoka Prefecture Location within Japan

Hatae Station (波多江駅, Hatae-eki) is a passenger railway station located in the city of Itoshima, Fukuoka Prefecture, Japan, operated by JR Kyushu.

== Lines ==
The station is served by the Chikuhi Line and is located 10.1 km from the starting point of the line at Meinohama. Local and weekday rapid services on the Chikuhi Line stop at this station.

== Station layout ==
The station consists of an island platform two tracks. The station building is a modern elevated structure where the station facilities are located on a bridge spanning the platform and which has entrances on both sides of the tracks. The bridge houses a waiting area, a staffed ticket window and ticket gates. From there, steps and an elevator give access to the island platform.

Management of the station has been outsourced to the JR Kyushu Tetsudou Eigyou Co., a wholly owned subsidiary of JR Kyushu specialising in station services. It staffs the ticket counter which is equipped with a Midori no Madoguchi facility.

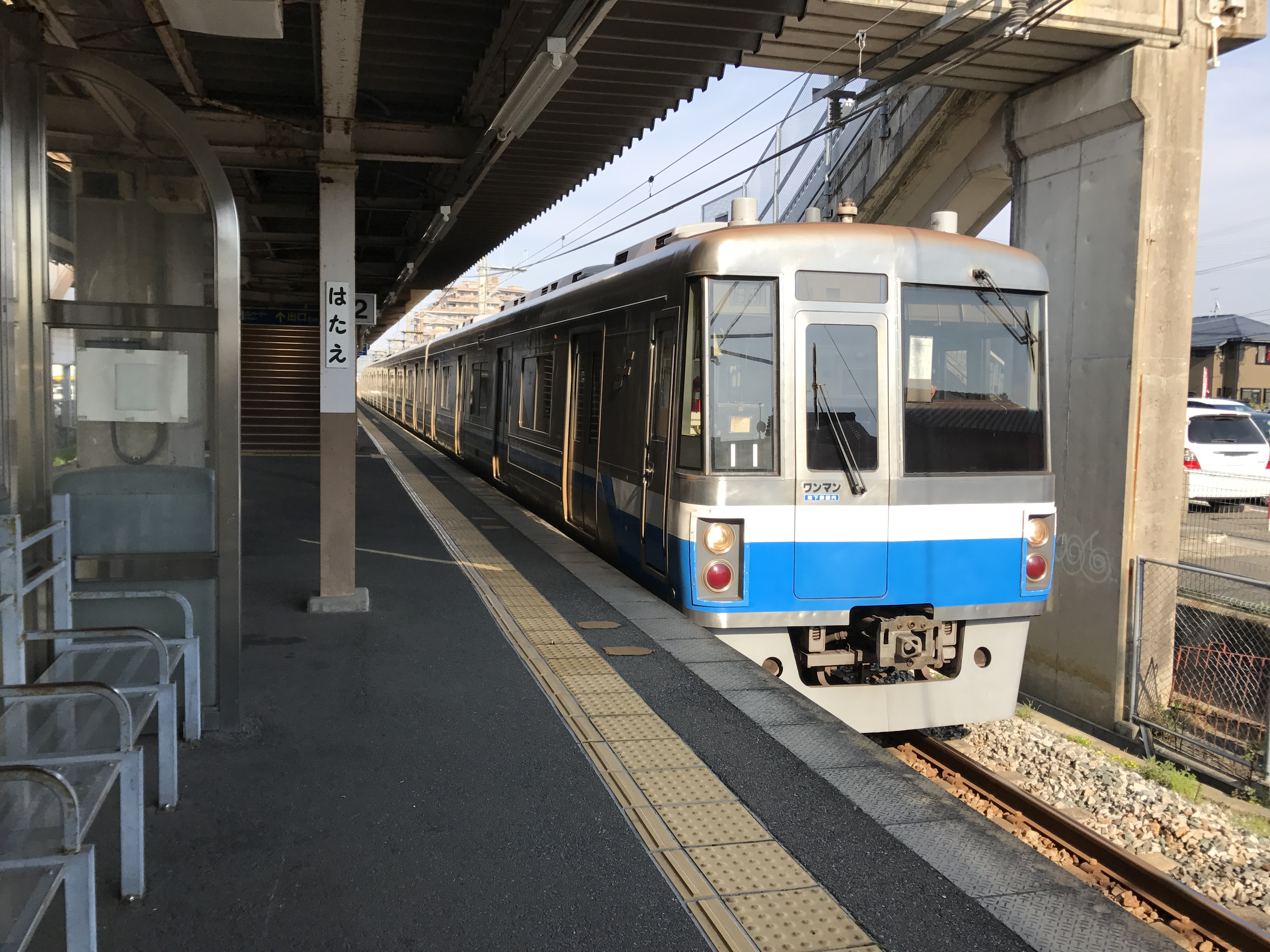
A view of platform 2. The stairs at the south entrance to the station building can be seen to the right.

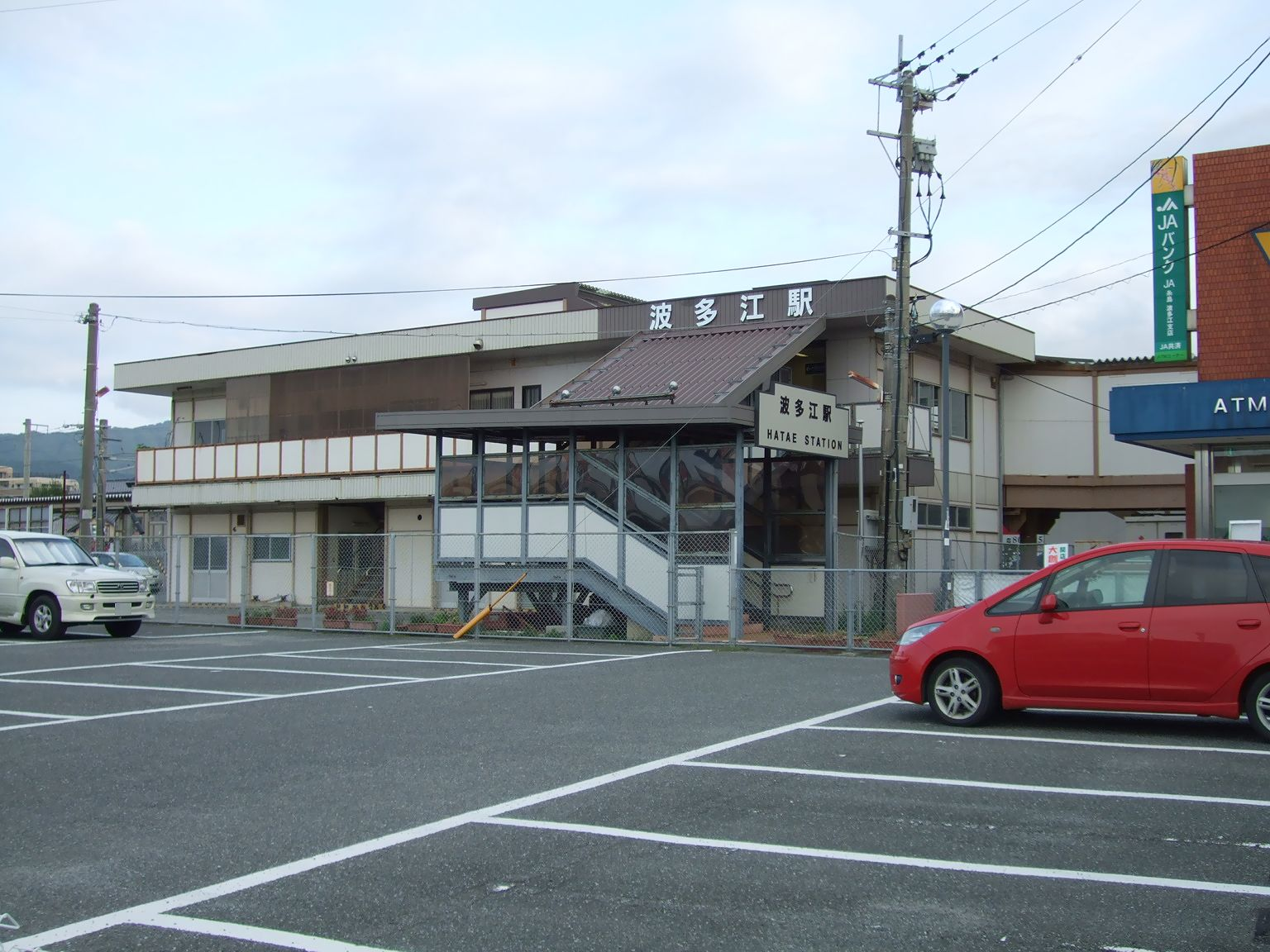
The old station building. This picture was taken in 2008.

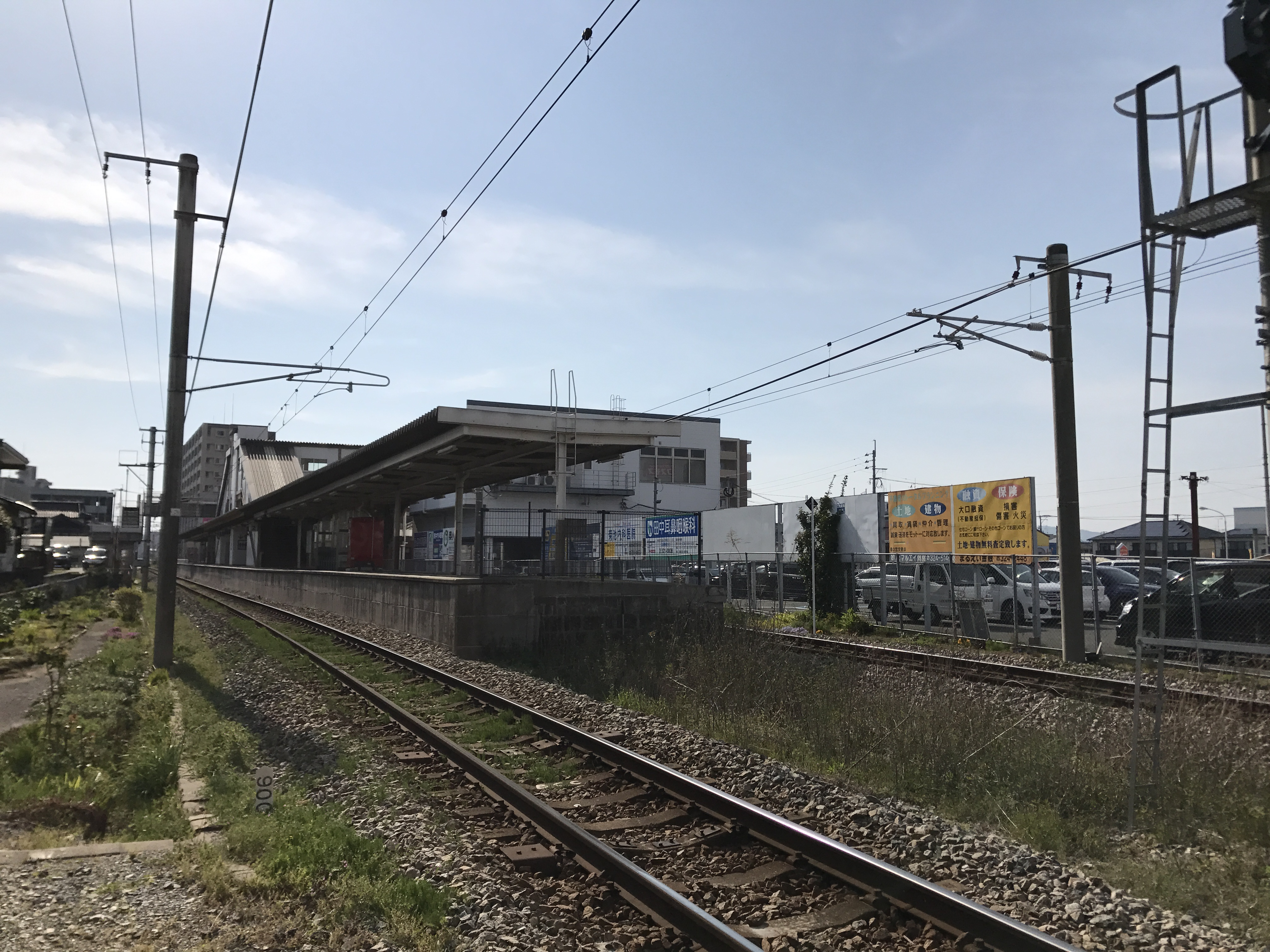
A distant view of the station, looking westwards. Note the hashigami station above the platform. To the left, the narrow stairwell of the south entrance can be seen.

=== Platforms ===
1	■ JK Chikuhi Line	for Meinohama; Airport Line for Tenjin, Hakata, and Fukuoka Airport
2	■ JK Chikuhi Line	for Chikuzen-Maebaru, Chikuzen-Fukae, Karatsu, and Nishi-Karatsu

== History ==
The private Kitakyushu Railway had opened a track between Fukuyoshi and Hamasaki on 5 December 1923. Expanding in phases, by 15 October 1926, the line had been extended east to Hakata and west to Higashi-Karatsu. Hatae Station was opened on 1 July 1928 as an additional station on the track. When the Kitakyushu Railway was nationalized on 1 October 1937, Japanese Government Railways (JGR) took over control of the station and designated the line which served it as the Chikuhi Line. With the privatization of Japanese National Railways (JNR), the successor of JGR, on 1 April 1987, control of the station passed to JR Kyushu.

== Passenger statistics ==
In fiscal 2020, the station was used by an average of 1920 passengers daily (boarding passengers only), and it ranked 76th among the busiest stations of JR Kyushu.

== Surrounding area ==
- JA Itoshima Hatae Branch
- Hatae Post Office
- Sannomiya Shrine

== See also ==
- List of railway stations in Japan
