= Itoshima =

Itoshima 糸島市
- City
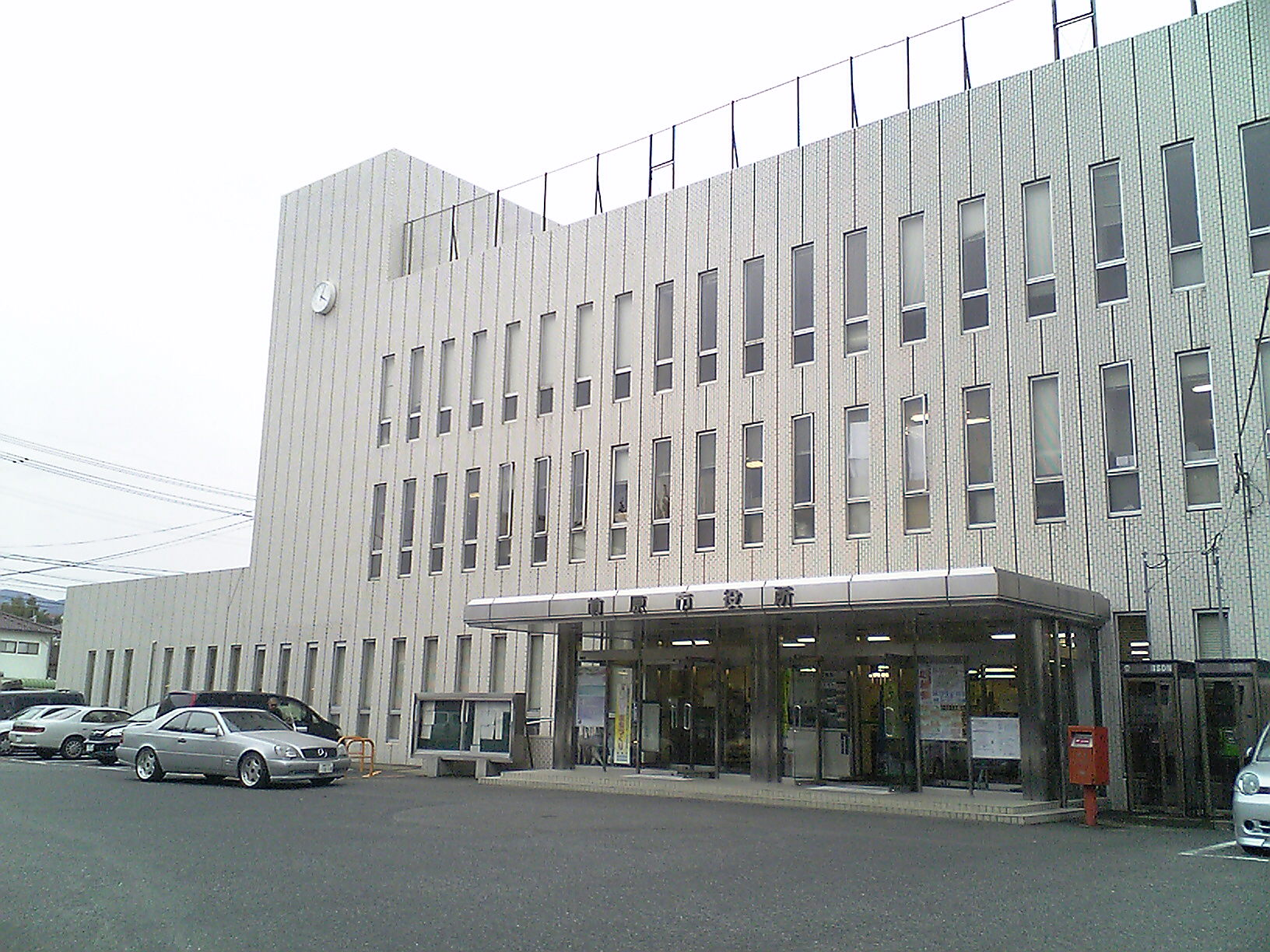
- Itoshima City Hall

- Flag Emblem
- Interactive map of Itoshima
- Location in Japan Itoshima (Fukuoka Prefecture)
- Coordinates: 33°33′14″N 130°11′52″E
- Country: Japan
- Region: Kyushu
- Prefecture: Fukuoka

Government
  - Mayor: Yuuji Tsukigata (since February, 2014)

Area
  - Total: 215.69 km^{2} (83.28 sq mi)

Population (March 31, 2024)
  - Total: 103,655
  - Density: 480.57/km^{2} (1,244.7/sq mi)
- Time zone: UTC+09:00 (JST)
- City hall address: 1-1-1 Maebaru-nishi, Itoshima-shi, Fukuoka-ken 819-1192
- Climate: Cfa
- Website: Official website
- Symbols
- Flower: Hibiscus hamabo
- Tree: Maple

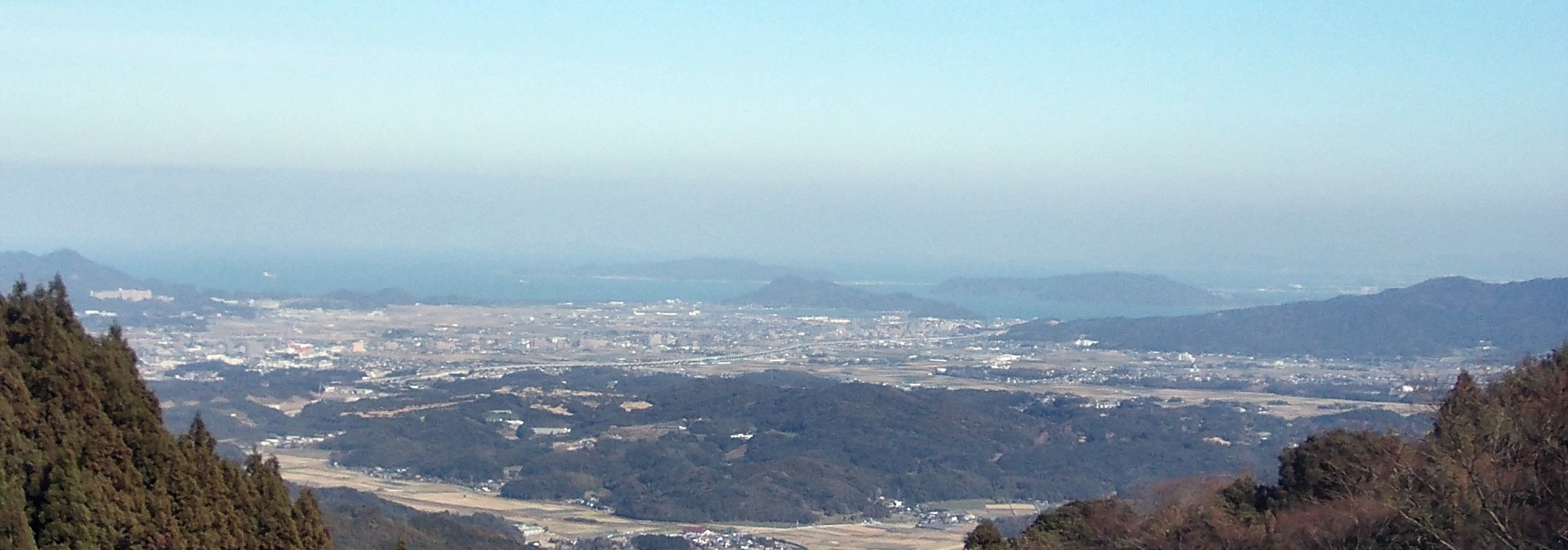
view of Itoshima from Shiraito Falls

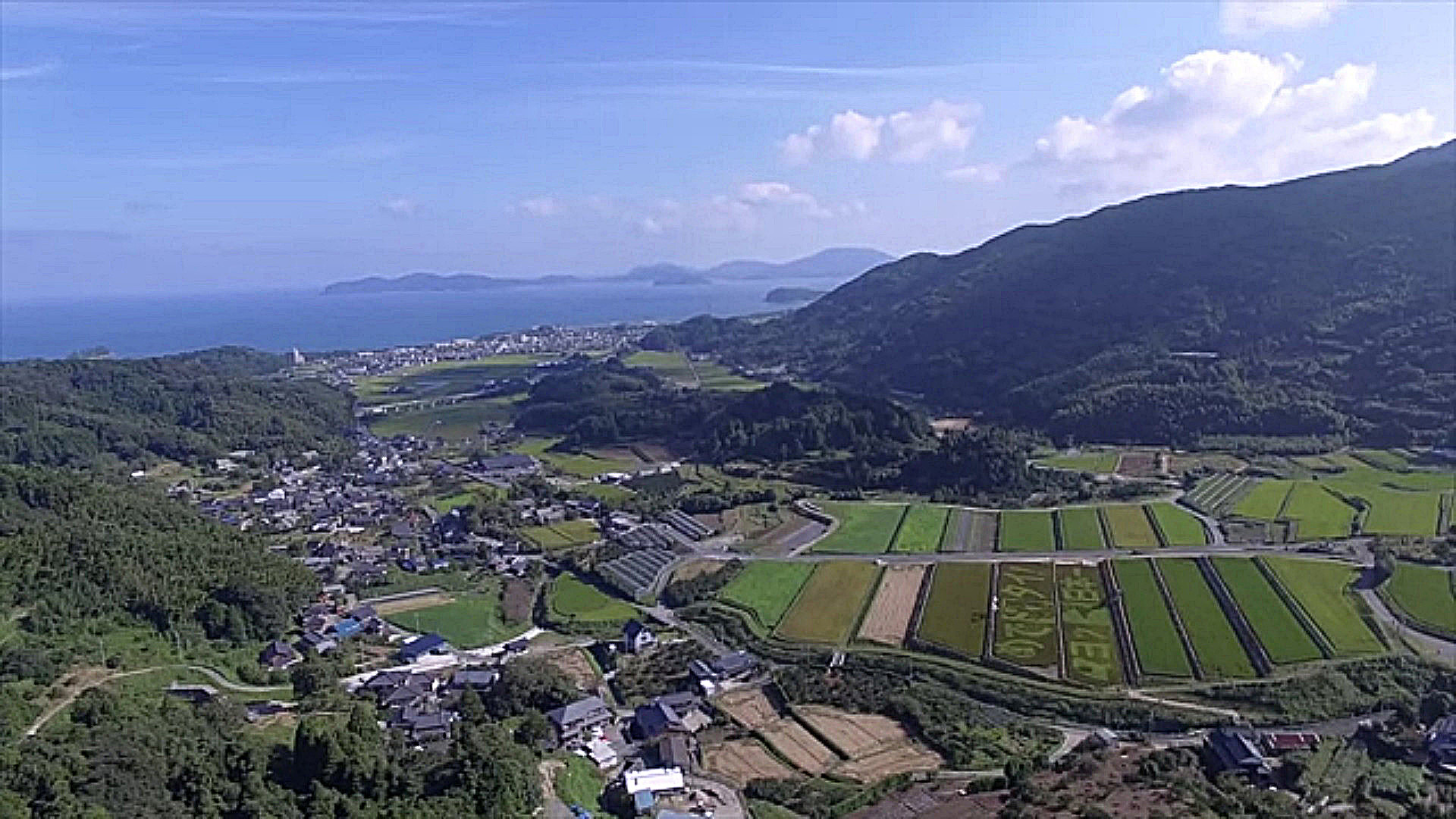
Terraced fields in Itoshima

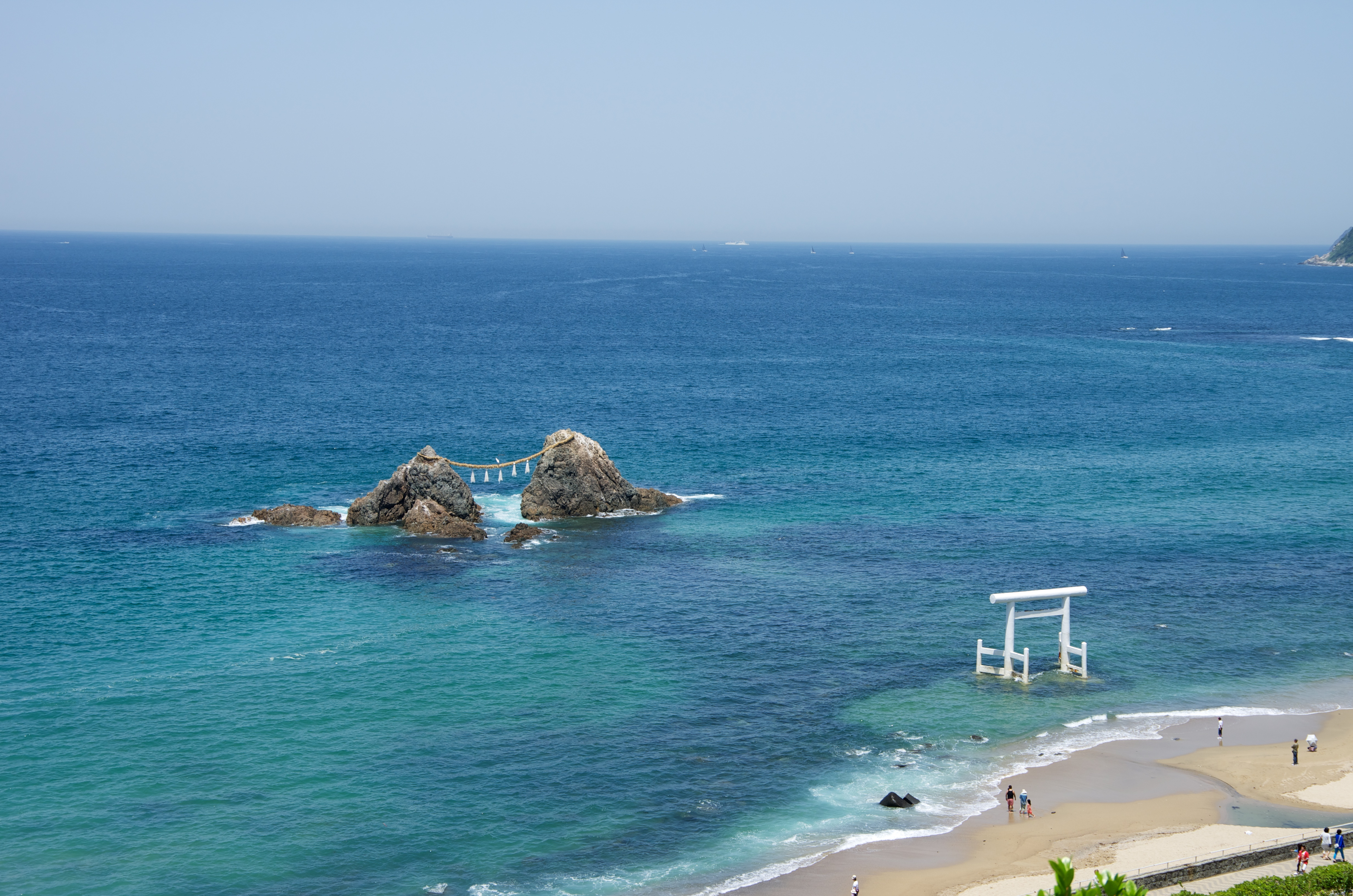
Futamigaura torii

Itoshima (糸島市, Itoshima-shi; Japanese pronunciation: [ì.tó̞.ɕí.mä́(.ɕì)]) is a city located in western Fukuoka Prefecture, Japan. As of 31 March 2024, the city had an estimated population of 103,655 in 46,192 households, and a population density of 480 persons per km². The total area of the city is 215.69 km^{2} (83.28 sq mi).

== Geography ==
Itoshima is located on the Itoshima Peninsula at the northwestern edge of Fukuoka Prefecture. The northern and western ends face the Genkai Sea, and the eastern side borders Fukuoka City. It is a mountainous area with the Sefuri Mountains in the south, bordering Saga Prefecture, the southwest bordering Karatsu City, and the southeast bordering Saga City.

=== Neighboring municipalities ===
Fukuoka Prefecture

- Fukuoka

Saga Prefecture

- Karatsu
- Saga

=== Climate ===
Itoshima has a humid subtropical climate (Köppen: Cfa). The average annual temperature in Itoshima is 16.4 °C (61.5 °F). The average annual rainfall is 1,701.0 mm (66.97 in) with July as the wettest month. The temperatures are highest on average in August, at around 27.6 °C (81.7 °F), and lowest in January, at around 6.2 °C (43.2 °F). The highest temperature ever recorded in Itoshima was 38.9 °C (102.0 °F) on 5 August 2017; the coldest temperature ever recorded was −4.7 °C (23.5 °F) on 28 February 1981.

Climate data for Maebaru, Itoshima (1991−2020 normals, extremes 1977−present)
| Month | Jan | Feb | Mar | Apr | May | Jun | Jul | Aug | Sep | Oct | Nov | Dec | Year |
|---|---|---|---|---|---|---|---|---|---|---|---|---|---|
| Record high °C (°F) | 20.4 (68.7) | 23.7 (74.7) | 26.2 (79.2) | 30.4 (86.7) | 33.0 (91.4) | 34.6 (94.3) | 36.8 (98.2) | 38.9 (102.0) | 37.4 (99.3) | 34.0 (93.2) | 27.9 (82.2) | 25.9 (78.6) | 38.9 (102.0) |
| Mean daily maximum °C (°F) | 9.9 (49.8) | 11.2 (52.2) | 14.4 (57.9) | 19.4 (66.9) | 24.1 (75.4) | 26.9 (80.4) | 30.7 (87.3) | 31.8 (89.2) | 28.0 (82.4) | 23.2 (73.8) | 17.8 (64.0) | 12.4 (54.3) | 20.8 (69.5) |
| Daily mean °C (°F) | 6.2 (43.2) | 7.0 (44.6) | 9.9 (49.8) | 14.4 (57.9) | 19.0 (66.2) | 22.6 (72.7) | 26.8 (80.2) | 27.6 (81.7) | 23.7 (74.7) | 18.6 (65.5) | 13.2 (55.8) | 8.2 (46.8) | 16.4 (61.6) |
| Mean daily minimum °C (°F) | 2.2 (36.0) | 2.6 (36.7) | 5.2 (41.4) | 9.3 (48.7) | 14.2 (57.6) | 19.0 (66.2) | 23.6 (74.5) | 24.1 (75.4) | 20.1 (68.2) | 14.1 (57.4) | 8.5 (47.3) | 3.8 (38.8) | 12.2 (54.0) |
| Record low °C (°F) | −4.5 (23.9) | −4.7 (23.5) | −3.0 (26.6) | −0.6 (30.9) | 4.6 (40.3) | 8.2 (46.8) | 15.3 (59.5) | 17.0 (62.6) | 8.0 (46.4) | 2.6 (36.7) | −0.5 (31.1) | −3.9 (25.0) | −4.7 (23.5) |
| Average precipitation mm (inches) | 78.8 (3.10) | 73.2 (2.88) | 109.1 (4.30) | 116.9 (4.60) | 123.4 (4.86) | 243.3 (9.58) | 294.1 (11.58) | 211.0 (8.31) | 188.0 (7.40) | 95.0 (3.74) | 96.8 (3.81) | 71.6 (2.82) | 1,701 (66.97) |
| Average precipitation days (≥ 1.0 mm) | 10.2 | 9.7 | 10.9 | 10.0 | 9.1 | 11.6 | 11.4 | 10.1 | 10.5 | 7.6 | 9.4 | 9.3 | 119.8 |
| Mean monthly sunshine hours | 103.4 | 120.2 | 158.9 | 186.9 | 198.3 | 136.8 | 174.9 | 202.9 | 162.0 | 171.5 | 132.3 | 104.2 | 1,852 |
Source: Japan Meteorological Agency

=== Demographics ===
Per Japanese census data, the population of Itoshima in 2020 is 98,877 people. Itoshima has been conducting censuses since 1920.

Historical population

| Year | Pop. | ±% |
|---|---|---|
| 1920 | 41,064 | — |
| 1925 | 43,103 | +5.0% |
| 1930 | 44,881 | +4.1% |
| 1935 | 44,823 | −0.1% |
| 1940 | 45,533 | +1.6% |
| 1945 | 60,260 | +32.3% |
| 1950 | 60,809 | +0.9% |
| 1955 | 62,021 | +2.0% |
| 1960 | 59,549 | −4.0% |
| 1965 | 56,863 | −4.5% |
| 1970 | 56,204 | −1.2% |

| Year | Pop. | ±% |
|---|---|---|
| 1975 | 59,697 | +6.2% |
| 1980 | 66,220 | +10.9% |
| 1985 | 73,649 | +11.2% |
| 1990 | 77,610 | +5.4% |
| 1995 | 88,691 | +14.3% |
| 2000 | 95,040 | +7.2% |
| 2005 | 97,974 | +3.1% |
| 2010 | 98,440 | +0.5% |
| 2015 | 96,475 | −2.0% |
| 2020 | 98,877 | +2.5% |

Itoshima population statistics

== History ==
In Itoshima, many Jomon period sites have been discovered, and Jomon people remains have been found at the Shimmachi stone burial mound group (新町支石墓群).

During the Yayoi period, it is believed that a country called Itokoku (伊都国) existed, which controlled the entire Itoshima Peninsula. Itokoku shared a border with Nakoku (奴国), a country that ruled over the entire Fukuoka Plain, including present-day Fukuoka City. In ancient Japanese history, the northern Kyushu region, including present-day Fukuoka Prefecture, was an important area, and many of the latest technologies and innovations in Japan originated in this region.

The Fukuoka region, including Itoshima, which is a peninsula jutting out into the Tsushima Current that branches off from the Kuroshio Current along the Ryukyu Islands, is believed to have had especially active exchanges with the Okinawa (Ryukyu) region since ancient times. In fact, obsidian produced in Saga Prefecture in southwestern Fukuoka has been excavated from archaeological sites on the Okinawa island. There is also believed to have been strong cultural exchange; for example, Okinawa’s maritime faith of Nirai Kanai (ニライカナイ) and the Wadatsumi (ワダツミ) and Munakata beliefs (宗像三神) that symbolize the Fukuoka and Itoshima areas are considered to have a common origin.

During the Edo period, the area was part of Fukuoka Domain. After the Meiji restoration, the villages of Fukuyoshi, Fukae, Ichikisan, Nagaihon (renamed Nagaito in 1892), Kafuri, Raiyama, Ito, Maehara, Hatae, Kaya, Kofuji, Keya, Nokita, and Sakurai were established on May 1, 1889 with the creation of the modern municipalities system. Maehara was raised to town status on September 15, 1901 and annexed Hatae and Kafuri on April 1, 1931. On January 1, 1955 Maebaru annexed Raiyama and Nagaito, followed by Ido on April 1 of the same year. Kaya, Sakurano, Kofuji, and Keya merged on January 1, 1955 to form the village of Shima, which became town on April 1, 1965. Likewise Ichikiyama, Fukae, and merged on January 1, 1955 to form the village of Nijo, which became town on April 1, 1965. Maebaru was raised to city status on October 1, 1992. Maebaru annexed Shima and Nijo on April 16, 2009 and was renamed Itoshima.

== Government ==
Itoshima has a mayor-council form of government with a directly elected mayor and a unicameral city council of 20 members. Itoshima contributes two members to the Fukuoka Prefectural Assembly. In terms of national politics, the city is part of the Fukuoka 3rd district of the lower house of the Diet of Japan.

== Economy ==
The economy of Itoshima is centered on agriculture, commercial fishing and tourism. There is one industrial park. An increasing proportion of the local workforce commutes to neighboring Fukuoka.

== Education ==
=== Universities ===
- Kurume Institute of Technology
- Kurume Shin-Ai Women's College
- Kurume University
  - Kurume University Hospital
- St.Mary's College

=== Primary and secondary education ===
Itoshima has 16 public elementary schools and six public junior high schools operated by the city government and two public high schools operated by the Fukuoka Prefectural Board of Education. Kyushu University and Nishi-nippon Junior College have campuses in Itoshima.

== Transportation ==
=== Railways ===
JR Kyushu - Chikuhi Line

JK Hatae - Itoshimakōkō-mae - Chikuzen-Maebaru - Misakigaoka - Kafuri - Ikisan - Chikuzen-Fukae - Dainyū - Fukuyoshi - Shikaka

=== Highways ===
- Nishi-Kyūshū Expressway
- National Route 202

== Local attractions ==
=== National Historic Sites ===
- Asakura Sue Ware Kiln Sites
- Ikisan Chōshizuka Kofun
- Ito Castle ruins
- Kamatsuka Kofun
- Mikumo-Iwara Site
- Raizan Kōgoishi
- Shinmachi Dolmen Cluster
- Shito Dolmen Cluster
- Sone Sites

== Culture and tourism ==
Itoshima is known for its seaside resorts, beaches, and natural beauty. It is a popular site for surfing and hiking. A summer music festival, Sunset Live, takes place each year.

== Notable people from Itoshima ==
- Dairoku Harada, Japanese archaeologist
- Ryuji Ichioka, Japanese professional baseball player (Pitcher - Hiroshima Toyo Carp, Central League, Nippon Professional Baseball)
- Mako "Hakata Speedster" Yamada, Japanese kickboxer and former boxer
- Mariko Shinoda, Japanese singer, actress, fashion model, and former member of the Japanese idol group AKB48
- Yujiro Seto, Japanese Paralympic judoka
