= Itokoku =

Historical Japanese State

map illustrating the path from the Daifeng commandery to Yamatai, and its distances in the Wajinden.

Ito-koku (伊都国) is one of the countries in Wa-koku, which appears in Chinese historical books such as Wajinden. It is said to be located 500 ri southeast of Matsurokoku, in the Yamato era, in the Prefecture of Ito (Ito no Agata), now Fukuoka Prefecture Itoshima City and part of Fukuoka City (formerly Ito-gun).

== Overview ==
In wajinden it says as follows

Travel 500 miles southeast to Itokoku. The official was called Erskine, and the deputy was called Goblet and Goblet. There are more than 1,000 families and kings, all of whom belong to the Queen. The county envoys are always stationed there

("Sanguozhi Wei Shu, Vol. 30, Biography of the East, Japanese (Abbreviated as Wei Shu, Biography of the East)")

The approximate meaning of the original text is: "If you go 500 ri southeast, you will reach Ito-kuni. There are more than 1,000 houses. There were kings for generations.。

They are all subordinate to the queen state. It is a place where emissaries from Daifang Commandery come and go and stop." The following is a brief description of the area.

Weilüe says 「500 miles southeast to Idukuni. There are more than 10,000 families. The officials were called Ershi, and the deputies were called Leixi and Shankui. The kings of the kingdom were all under the queen.」

The approximate meaning of the original text is: "Go southeast 500 ri (from Suoro-gun) and you will reach Ito-gun, where there are more than 1,000 houses. The chief magistrate there is called Jiqi, and his lieutenants are called Sesukei and Heikyong. All the kings of the land belong to the queen".

In the "Wei Shihwa Den" and the "Wei Narrative," it is stated that "kings" existed in Itokoku, Yamatai, and Gunoku, while in the other countries only the names of officials such as directors and deputy directors are mentioned.

Former editor Takeshi Ueno also deciphered "Wei-Shi-Wa-jin-Den" from the perspective of historical criticism and concluded that Himiko's capital was Itsukoku. (Related to the Hirabara site mentioned below)

=== Ichidaisotsu: Inspector General ===
The Ichidaisotsu (一大率; lit. 'great leader') was an official of Yamatai working under Queen Himiko.

The Wajinden records that this office was responsible for "自女王國以北", translating roughly to "The Queen's Land and Northward".

A fuller excerpt:

- 特置一大率検察諸國 諸國畏揮之 常治伊都國 於國中有如刺史.

The approximate meaning of the original text is: "The Queen Country has placed a special inspector general in the north. The nations fear this (=the Queen Country) and take care of it (=the Queen Country). A permanent government office (like the Daifang County "reign" of Wei) was established in Ito Country. It appears to be the same position as that of the stabber in the Guozhong (= Wei)."

The Ichidaisotsu (一大卒; lit. 'great leader') was official position in the kingdom of Ito in northern Kyushu during the late 3rd century. According to the Wajinden (魏志倭人伝, Gishi Wajinden; those passages in the 30th volume of the Chinese history chronicle Records of the Three Kingdoms that talk about the Wa people), this office was responsible for investigating and reporting on those regions north of the kingdom of Yamatai. The office was apparently feared and respected by those in Ito. The ichidaisotsu also served as envoy between the queen and the capital city of the Wei kingdom, the Daifang Commandery, and the various kingdoms on the Korean peninsula. Conversely, when the Daifang Commandery sent envoys, the ichidaisotsu was responsible for communicating with them and for ensuring that documents and gifts were accurately conveyed to the queen.

It is not clear who the primary authority behind the establishment of the Ichidaisotsu was, with theories that it was either the kingdom of Wei or Yamatai. One source suggests that the Chinese origin of the sotsu in the title could suggest that the official may have been sent from the Daifang Commandery; however, the entirety of the title is from Chinese, not just the sotsu portion.

=== Descriptions in Japanese literature ===
The former Yido County was located in Itsuki-gata before the Taika Reform. According to The Chronicles of Japan, the founder of Yido County was named Itote, and he returned to Japan when Emperor Chūai Emperor Chūai conquered Tsukushi. There is an Itote shrine in the Nishi ward of Fukuoka City.

According to an anecdote in the Chikuzen-no-kuni-fudoki (筑前国風土記, Chikuzen Province Fudoki), the shrine was praised as "Isoshi" because it welcomed and served the emperor who went to Tsukushi. The name "Isoshi" is said to have been derived from "Ito" (伊覩). It is also said that Gojatote told the emperor that he was a descendant of Amenohiboko (≠ Amanihiboko no Mikoto), who had descended from the heavens to Mount Iro in Goryeo.

== Archaeological Site ==
It is widely believed that Ito Province existed in the area of the Itoshima Plain centered on Mikumo in Itoshima City. From the latter half of the Yayoi period to the end of the Yayoi period, a series of burial mounds (royal tombs) were constructed, including the San-un Minami-shoji and Hirabaru ruins. The Ibara Yarimizo site is said to have a high possibility of being a "Shogun's tomb" in terms of artifacts.

=== Sangunnaminamikoji Ruins ===
The Sangunnaminamikoji Site (National Historic Site) is a Yayoi era tomb of the middle Yayoi period, and is said to be a 'royal tomb' with two jar coffin tombs.

The coffin tomb No. 1 has 1 copper sword, 2 Dohoku, 1 Douka, 8 or more broken pieces of glass, 3 glass Kudatama, 3 pieces of glass Kudatama 60 or more, copper mirror 31 or more surfaces, gilded copper four-leaf zaguar for eight individuals, for example. In addition, 1 Tetsuzoku and 1 small glass bead were excavated. Most of the mirrors are of the heavy circle or Flower mirror style, beginning with "Kiyoseihaku", and the outer rim matching a mirror with an uchigyoka design, which has been handed down at Shōfuku-ji Temple in Hakata-ku, Fukuoka City, has been excavated. The diameter of this mirror is 16.4 centimeters. The No. 2 jar coffin tomb is located close (15 cm across) to the northwest of the No. 1 jar coffin tomb. Inside the jar coffin, a mirror with an inner flower pattern (Sunlight mirror) was found in its original position. The bronze mirror is 6.5 cm in diameter and bears the inscription "Seeing the light of the sun, it will be very clear under the heavens. The burial accessories consisted of 22 bronze mirrors (1 with a nebula design, 4 with inscription on inner band mirror, 1 with a heavy circle design, and 16 sun mirrors), 12 small glass jade beads, 1 hard jade bead, and a glass hanging decoration (measuring less than 1 cm in diameter and dark blue in color). dark blue) were excavated. Many of the bronze mirrors are around 6.5 cm in diameter. If Tomb 1 is the "king," Tomb 2 is presumed to be the "queen. Tetsunobu Aoyagi wrote that the tomb was a mound tomb with a fill of more than 1.5 meters. In a survey conducted in the Heisei period, it was found to have a "perforated ditch," and it was identified as a "square perforated ditch tomb," and it is currently being reconstructed as such.

The bronze sword with a handle excavated from the tomb is said to be related to the Amenomora no Ken enshrined in the Atsuta Jingu

=== Ihara Yarimizo Ruins ===
The Ihara Yarimizo Ruins are located in the vicinity of the Migumo Ruins. (According to local legend, the name "Yarimizo" came from the fact that a spear (Yari) was found in the soil.) According to Aoyagi Tadanobu's book, "Ryuen Kouki Kouki Kou", 21 mirrors were excavated from this site during the Tenmei period (1781–1788). Rubbings indicate that all of them are square rectangular mirrors with four divine motifs (with edges of flowing cloud, grass leaf, wave, and ninjutsu-style flower patterns). Many of the mirrors are Later Han scale and measure 6", dating from the Xin period of Wang 莽 to the Later Han dynasty. In addition to these mirrors, three bronze vessels in the shape of a ba-shaped bronze, iron swords, and iron swords have been found, but no fine-shaped bronze swords or bronze contradictions have been found. The 1974 (Showa49) – 1975 (Showa 50) surveys could not confirm the location of this site. However, it is believed that it was definitely a jar coffin tomb.。

=== Hirahara Site ===
The Hirahara Site (a national historic site) is the combined name of a group of five peri-ditch tombs from the late Yayoi Period to the end of the Yayoi Period that exist on the Sone terrace to the west of the San'unnamikoji Site. The king's tomb in tomb No. 1 may be the queen's tomb. It is said that the tomb is the largest of its kind in Japan. The largest burial item in Japan, 46.5 cm in diameter, was found in Tomb No. 1 (Hirahara Yayoi Kofun) at the Hirahara Site. No. Large inward-looking flower mirror (inward-looking flower mirror) 4 sides(5 sides)）、The collection includes 35 bronze mirrors (32 rectangular four-faced mirrors, 2 four-leaf mirrors with inner rows of flowers, and 1 four-faced mirror), 3 glass beads, over 500 round beads, 12 agate balls, many glass balls and small glass beads, 1 iron sword with a ring head, and other items, all of which have been designated National Treasure. The relationship with the Yata Kagami of the Three Sacred Treasures is under debate.

== See also ==
- Wajinden
- Yayoi period
- Sone archaeological site
- Hirabaru Ruins

== Bibliography ==
- 「柳園古器略考」青柳種信著
- 「原田大六論」原田大六著
- 「実在した神話」原田大六著
- 「平原弥生古墳 大日孁貴の墓」原田大六著
- 「悲劇の金印」原田大六著
- 「倭女王 大日孁貴の墓」井手將雪著
- 「前原市文化財調査報告書 第七十集 平原遺跡」
