= Dairoku =

- Gender: Male

Origin
- Origin: Japanese
- Meaning: Different meanings depending on the kanji used

Dairoku (written: 大麓 or 大六) is a masculine Japanese given name. Notable people with the name include:

- Dairoku Harada (原田 大六) (1917–1985), Japanese archaeologist
- Kikuchi Dairoku (菊池 大麓) (1855–1917), Japanese mathematician and educator
