= Amatsuka Kofun =

Kofun period keyhole-shaped burial mound in Japan

- 天塚古墳 (Japanese)
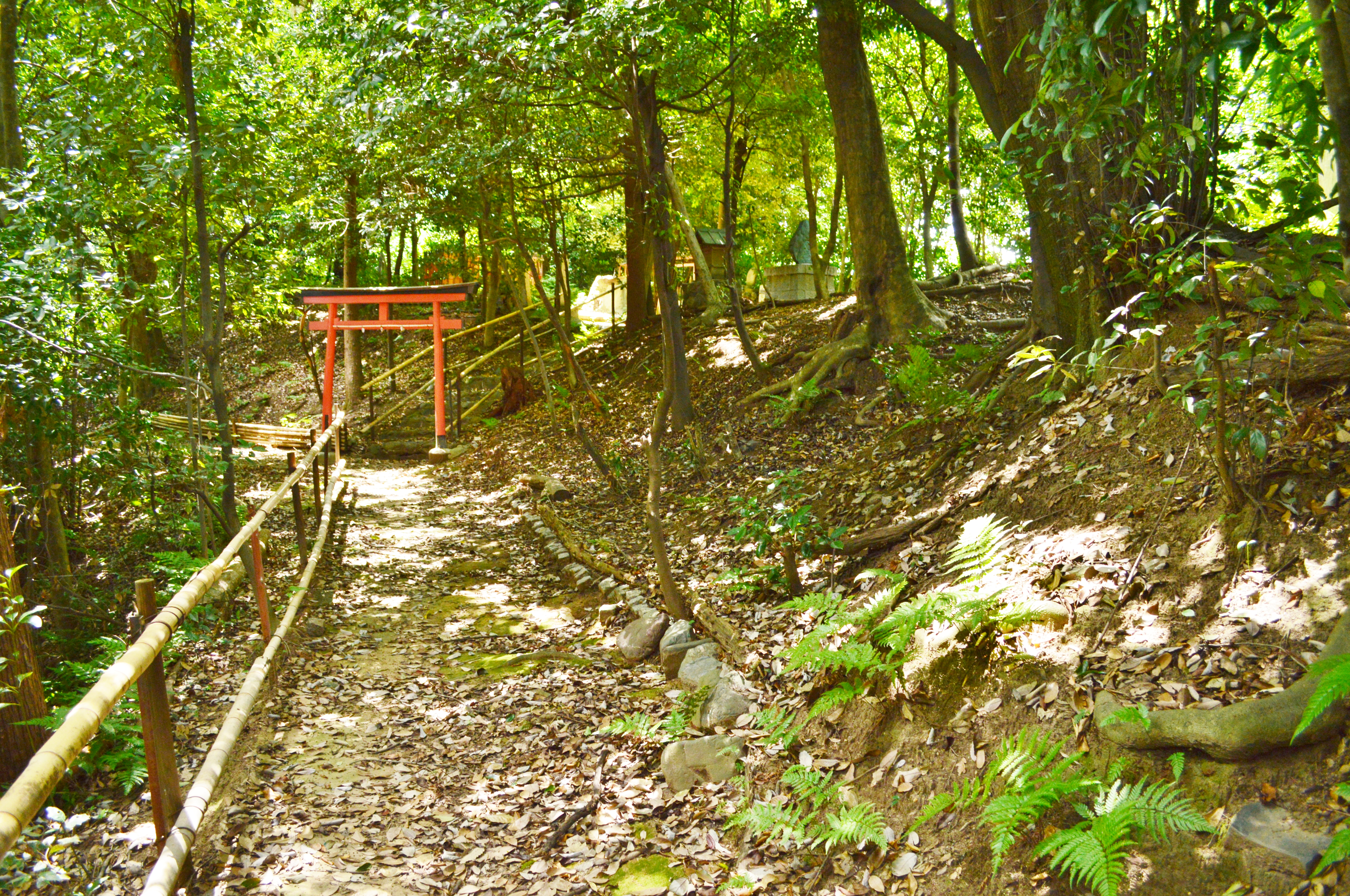
- Amatsuka Kofun

- Amatsuka Kofun Amatsuka Kofun (Japan)
- 35°0′25.57″N 135°42′43.45″E
- Type: Kofun
- Periods: Kofun period
- Location: Ukyō-ku, Kyoto, Japan
- Region: Kansai region

History
- Built: c.6th century

Site notes
- Public access: Yes (no facilities)
- National Historic Site of Japan

Amatsuka Kofun (天塚古墳) was a Kofun period keyhole-shaped burial mound, located in the Uzumasa Matsumoto-cho neighborhood of Ukyō-ku the city of Kyoto in the Kansai region of Japan. The tumulus was designated a National Historic Site of Japan in 1978. Along with the other kofun in the Sagano-Uzumasa region from around the end of the 6th century to the beginning of the 7th century, it is thought to be connected to the Hata clan, a clan of toraijin immigrants whose stronghold was in this area.

== Overview ==
The Amatsuka Kofun was a zenpō-kōen-fun (前方後円墳), which is shaped like a keyhole, having one square end and one circular end, when viewed from above. It is located in the Sagano-Uzumasa region of the Yamashiro Basin, where many kofun from the 6th century onwards are concentrated, including four large keyhole-shaped tumuli: Hebizuka Kofun, Amatsuka Kofun, Taruyama Kofun (under Imperial Household Agency protection) and the Shimizuyama Kofun (now destroyed). The Amatsuka Kofun is the second largest in the group after the Hebizuka Kofun, and is located about one kilometer southeast of Hebizuka Kofun. The tumulus has a two-tiered mound with the front orientated to the south. It is known that there was once a moat around it that was more than 20 meters wide. The total length of the tumulus is about 73 meters, the circular posterior portion is 40 meters in diameter and nine meters high, and the anterior rectangular portion is 50 meters wide and nine meters high. There are two horizontal-entry stone burial chambers in the circular portion. Cylindrical haniwa clay figures have been found on the outside of the mound. There is also a circular mound in the northwest, which is thought to be a secondary baizuka kofun..

Grave goods excavated in 1887 include horse equipment, iron swords and arrowheads, Sue ware pottery and bronze mirrors. Based on the excavated items and the shape of the tumulus, it is estimated to have been constructed in the 6th century. These artifacts are stored at the Kyoto National Museum. No modern archaeological excavation have been conducted at this site. Currently, access to one of the two stone chambers is restricted.

The tumulus is about a seven-minute walk from Kaikonoyashiro Station on the Keifuku Electric Railway Arashiyama Main Line.

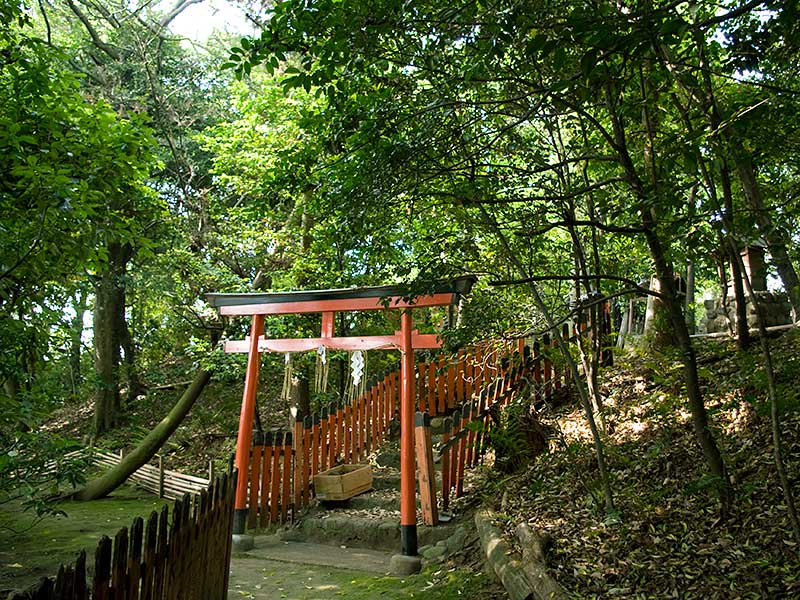
External view

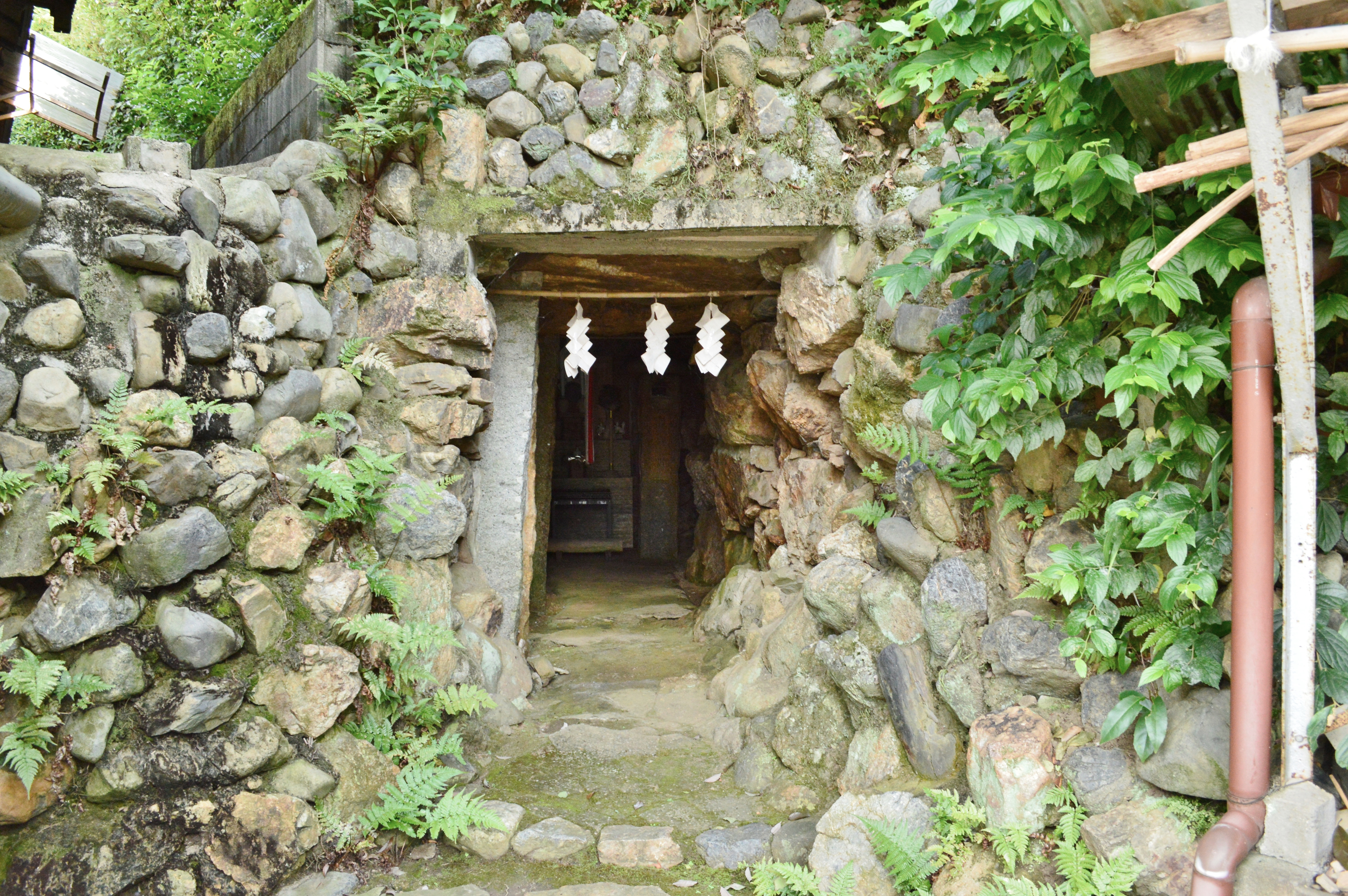
Entrance

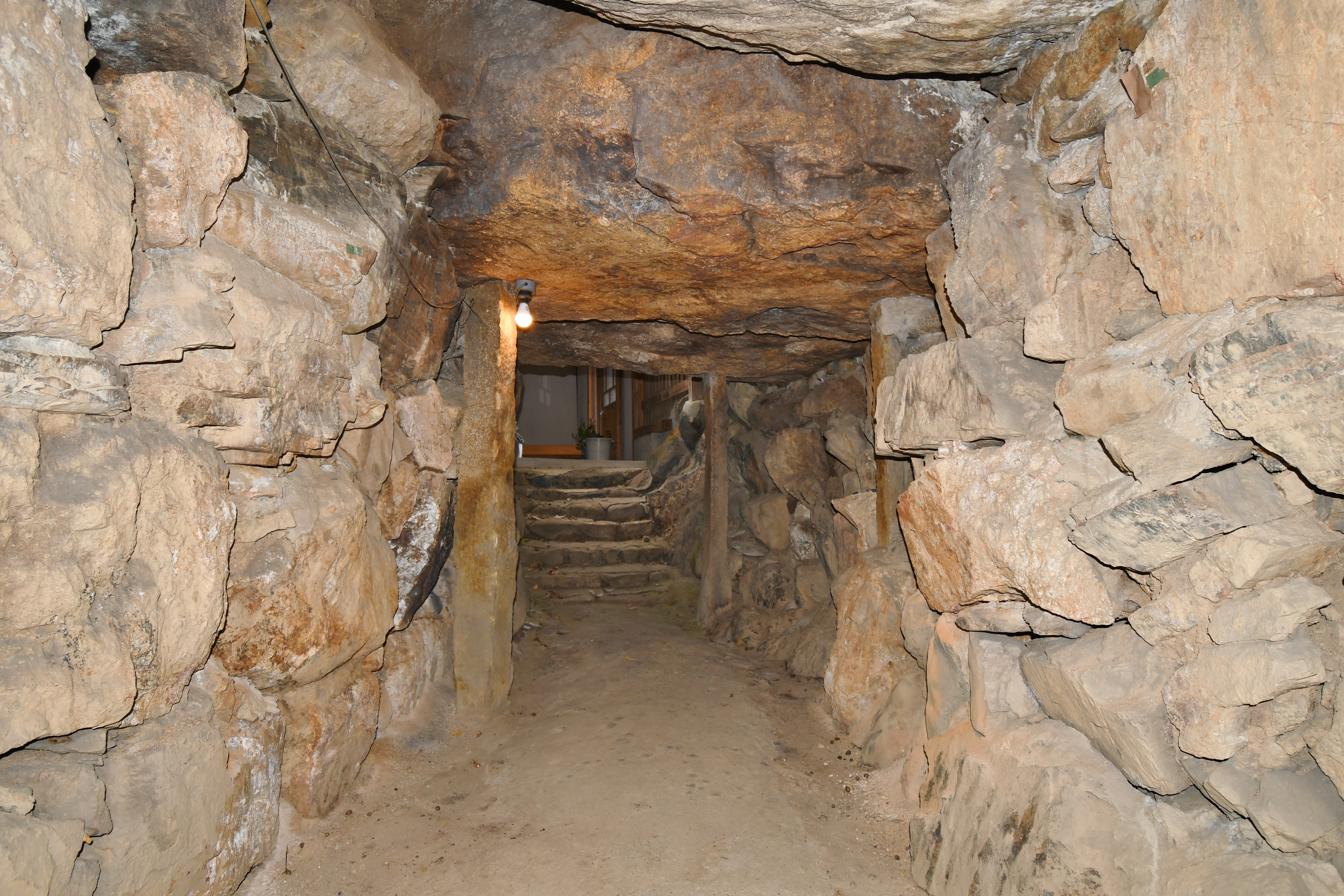
Burial chamber

== See also ==
- List of Historic Sites of Japan (Kyoto)
