= Mirror with linked arcs =

Han dynasty bronze mirror

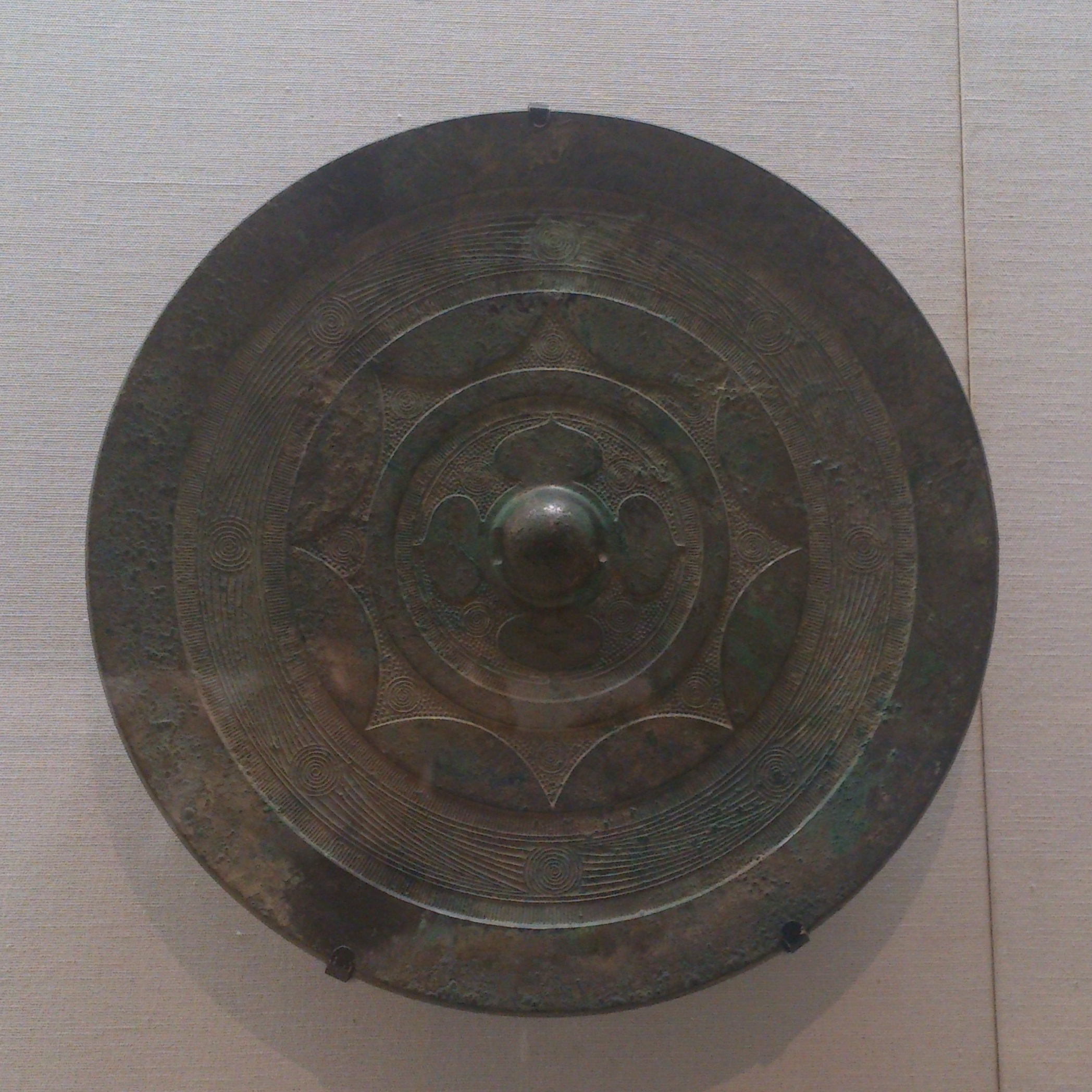
A mirror unearthed from Yanagimoto Otsuka Tomb, displayed in Tokyo National Museum

Mirror with linked arcs (内行花文鏡, Naikoukamonkyō) are a type of bronze mirror that was popular in the late Han dynasty in China. They were imported from the Yayoi period to the Kofun period, along with imitations made by Yayoi.

== History ==
They flourished in China in the early Han dynasty and were distributed mainly north of the Yellow River basin. It is thought that inscribed mirrors, which have a series of inward arcs, were created by replacing the bevelled thunder pattern, and it is characterized by a flat geometric pattern.

== Design ==
The mirrors often have no inscriptions other than four words of good fortune in a four-leaf or four-linked arc pattern on the knob. A mirror with a linked arc design in the collection of Harvard University Art Museums was made in the 7th year of Yongping (AD 64) at a private workshop called Gongsun (公孫家). The piece was priced at 300 qian (less than the monthly salary of a low-ranking official), which suggests that it was a daily commodity.

They have been excavated in various places in China, as well as in the Yayoi and Kofun periods in Japan and in the Lappan tumulus in Korea, with many examples from the early and middle Kofun period. Sanyumo Minamikoji Ruins (31 mirrors) and the Hirabaru Ruins (8 mirrors) were excavated from northern Kyushu in the early period.

This mirror has a pattern consisting of eight basic arcs arranged inwardly around a knob at the center of the back of the mirror. However, rare mirrors have been found with 11, 9, 6, and 5 arcs. The linked arc pattern is compared to petals, giving rise to their name in Japan they are called "mirrors with an inner flower pattern.

Variations range from palm-sized mirrors to much larger mirrors used in rituals. Mirrors with a bead pattern placed on the knob holder, and mirrors with a straight-arc border with a pattern using straight lines and circles have been found. Some of these mirrors have a variety of images formed between the arcs and the button heads.

== Discoveries ==
A Large mirror with linked arcs with a diameter of 46.5 cm was included in a batch of artifacts excavated from the Hirabaru Square Trench Tombs in Fukuoka Prefecture, which was designated a National Treasure in 2006. It is the largest copper mirror excavated in Japan to date.

In 2017, a mirror with linked arcs in near perfect condition with little rust was excavated at the Nakajima Ruins in Iseida, Hakata-ku, Fukuoka City.

== See also ==
- National Treasure (Japan)
- Itokoku
- Hirabaru Ruins
- Yata no Kagami
- Large mirror with linked arcs
- Inscribed mirror

== Bibliography ==
- 岡村秀典 (2017). 鏡が語る古代史. 岩波新書. 岩波書店. ISBN 978-4-00-431664-0.
