= Heijiro Nakayama =

Japanese pathologist and archaeologist

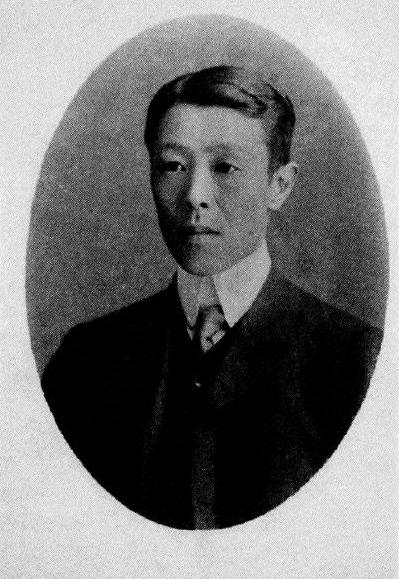
- Heijiro Nakayama
- Born: June 3, 1871; Kyoto City, Japan
- Died: April 29, 1956 (aged 84)
- Occupations: Professor of Pathology, Kyushu University, later archaeologist
- Known for: Archaeologist in Fukuoka Prefecture

Heijiro Nakayama (中山 平次郎, Nakayama Heijirō; June 3, 1871 – April 29, 1956) was a Japanese pathologist and archaeologist living in Fukuoka.

== Life ==
Heijiro Nakayama was born in 1871 in Kyoto City to a family of physicians. In 1874, he moved to Tokyo. During secondary school days, he was interested in archaeology and found remains, possibly, Yayoi pottery. He graduated from the Faculty of Medicine, Tokyo Imperial University and studied in Germany between 1903 and 1906. In the same ship was Sunao Tawara, also a pathologist. Nakayama became Professor of Pathology, Kyushu Medical University of Kyoto Imperial University, now Kyushu University at age 35. Nakayama's elder brother, Morihiko Nakayama served as Professor of Surgery at the same school. Nakayama's students included a Chinese physician Guo Moruo and Hakaru Hashimoto. Hashimoto thanked Nakayama for his guidance in his paper which led to the name of Hashimoto's thyroiditis. Nakayama studied the life cycle of Schistosoma japonicum.

== Archaeology ==
In 1909, he was accidentally infected with pyogenic bacteria during an autopsy, but fortunately survived. Since then, he completely discontinued pathological studies and started archaeology. Sunao Tawara, Professor of Pathology, pathologist of another department of Kyushu University undertook pathological studies.

== Taishō era ==
During the Taishō era (1912–1926), he exclusively wrote in Kohkogaku zasshi (Jpn J Archaeology), and he was criticized that he monopolized this journal, although this journal was open nationwide. In the early years of the Showa era, upon hearing the criticism, he discontinued his studies and turned to angling near his home, along the Hakata Bay. After the war, he taught archaeology to Dairoku Harada upon his return from military service.

== Archaeological achievements ==
- Designation of Genko Borui. There was a long line of stone defense structure along the Hakata Bay, constructed against possible attack of the Yuan dynasty and Nakayama named it Genko Borui in 1913. Previously it had been called Ishitsuiji.
- He studied the site of King of Na gold seal, a national treasure of Japan which was given by China. It was discovered by a peasant on April 12, 1784, on Shikanoshima Island, Fukuoka. It is now stored in the Fukuoka city Museum.
- Discovery of various remains now considered belonging to the Yayoi era.
- Proposal of the site of Kōrokan, Japanese Government Foreign Affairs Site in Hakata. He proposed that it was in the Fukuoka Castle and this was verified after excavation in 1987.

== Papers ==
- Historic remains around Fukuoka, Fukuoka Nichi Nichi Shimbun, 1912.
- The value of Genko Borui(Long stone fort against another invasion by Mongolia) in Fukuoka Nichi NichiShimbun, 1913. (He named the remains Genko Borui.
- The remains of the Intermediate Period (corresponding to Yayoi Period), Kokogaku Zasshi, Vol 7, Nr.10,11, Vol.8, 1,3, 1917–1918.
- Kohrokan, the foreign affairs bureau of Japan, is in the Fukuoka Castle. Kohkogaku Zasshi, 16,1926,17,1927. (1926–1927)

== See also ==
- List of pathologists
