= Hebizuka Kofun =

Kofun period keyhole-shaped burial mound in Japan

- 蛇塚古墳 (Japanese)
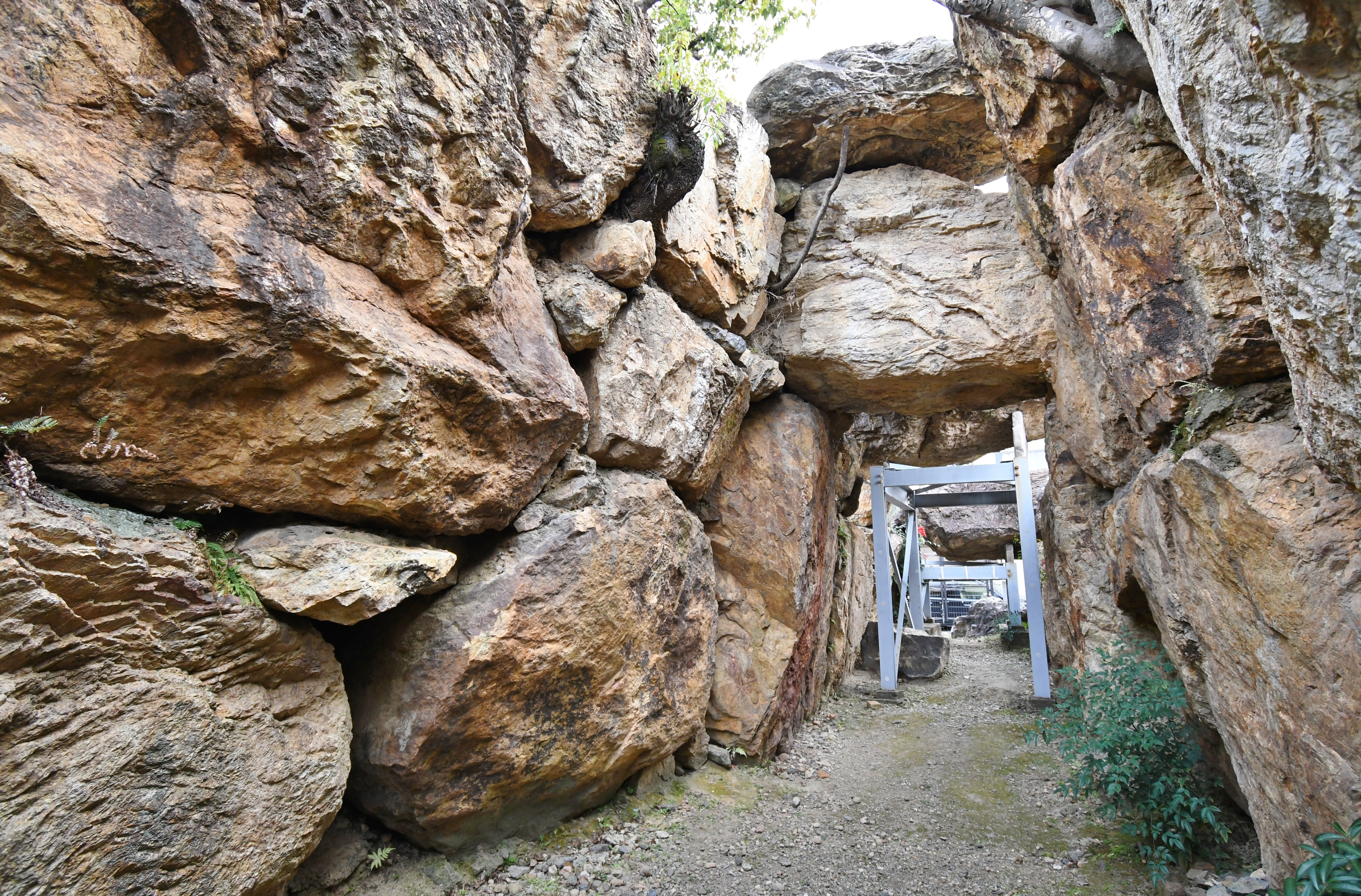
- Hebizuka Kofun

- Hebizuka Kofun Hebizuka Kofun (Japan)
- Interactive map of Hebizuka Kofun
- 35°0′43.15″N 135°42′0.48″E
- Type: Kofun
- Periods: Kofun period
- Location: Ukyō-ku, Kyoto, Japan
- Region: Kansai region

History
- Built: c.6th-7th century

Site notes
- Public access: Yes (no facilities)

蛇塚古墳周辺の宅地区画

Hebizuka Kofun (蛇塚古墳) was a Kofun period keyhole-shaped burial mound, located in the Uzumasa Omokage-cho neighborhood of Ukyō-ku the city of Kyoto in the Kansai region of Japan. The tumulus was designated a National Historic Site of Japan in 1977. Along with the other kofun in the Sagano-Uzumasa region from around the end of the 6th century to the beginning of the 7th century, it is thought to be connected to the Hata clan, a clan of toraijin immigrants whose stronghold was in this area.

== Overview ==
The Hebizuka Kofun was a zenpō-kōen-fun (前方後円墳), which is shaped like a keyhole, having one square end and one circular end, when viewed from above. It is located in the Sagano-Uzumasa region of the Yamashiro Basin, where many kofun from the 6th century onwards are concentrated, including four large keyhole-shaped tumuli: Hebizuka Kofun, Amatsuka Kofun, Taruyama Kofun (under Imperial Household Agency protection) and the Shimizuyama Kofun (now destroyed). The Hebizuka Kofun is the largest late-Kofun period tumulus in Kyoto Prefecture, and is known for its horizontal-entry stone burial chamber made of megaliths. Until around 1920, part of the mound remained, but due to urban encroachment, now only the stone burial chamber remains.

The outlines of the tumulus can still be discerned by the spacial arrangement of residential houses surrounding the burial chamber, and it is estimated to have had a total length of about 75 meters. The burial chamber opens to the southeast, and the total length of the burial chamber including the passage is 17.8 meters; the burial chamber proper is 3.8 by 6.8 meters wide and 5 meters high. Both the side and back walls are made of huge stones in two or three tiers, and all but one of the ceiling stones has been lost. The burial chamber of this tumulus is comparable to that of Ishibutai Kofun in Asuka, making it the fourth largest in Japan; however, whereas the Ishibuta Kofun's burial chamber is made from granite, the Hebizuka Kofun is made from chert. It is thought to date back to the 7th century. Historical records indicate that a house-shaped stone sarcophagus was once located inside the burial chamber, but this is now gone. No grave goods are known to have been found, and no archaeological excavation has been conducted to date. Currently, access to the burial chamber is restricted.

The Hebizuka Kofun is about a seven-minute walk from Katabiranotsuji Station on the Keifuku Electric Railway.

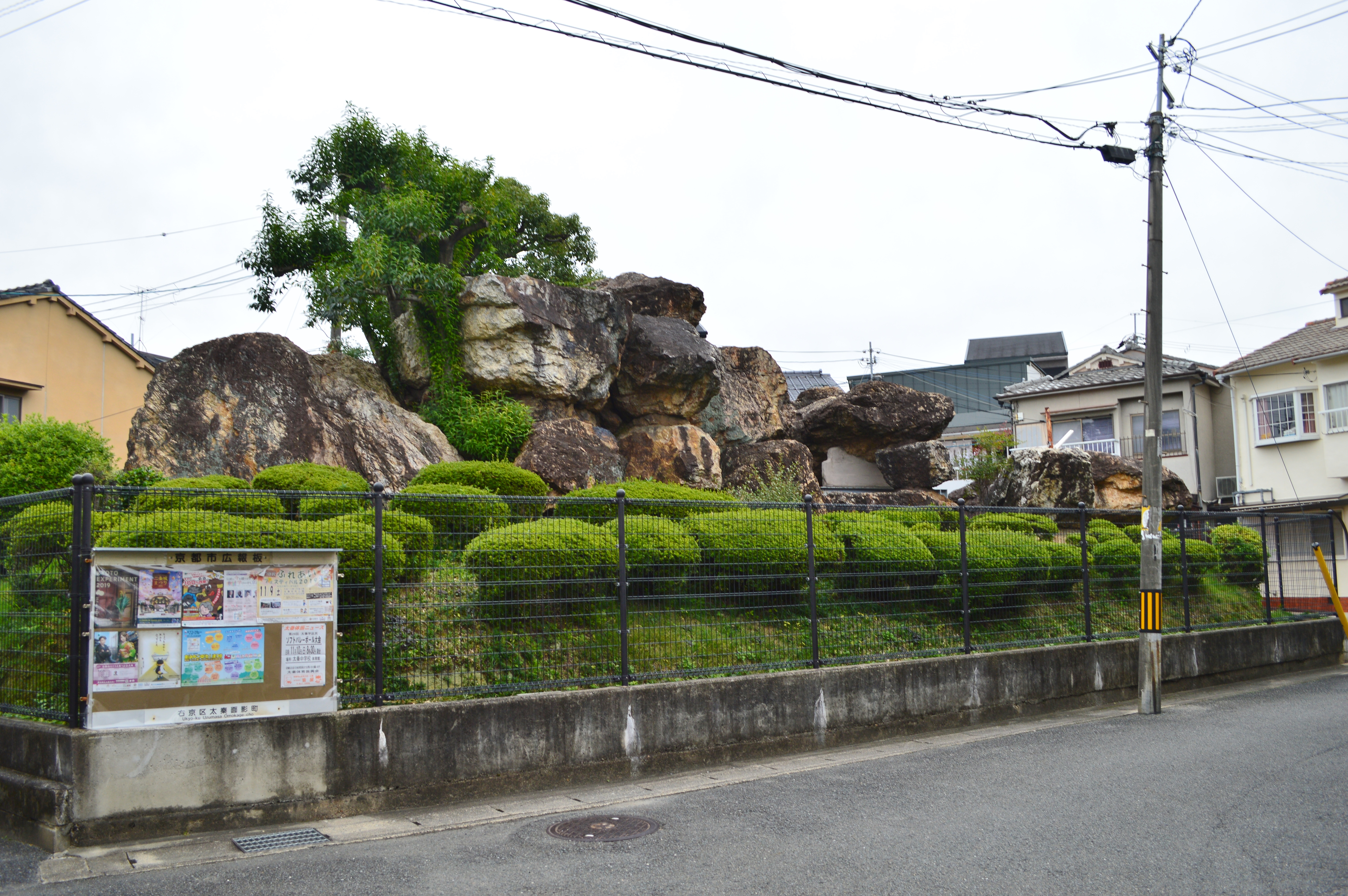
External view

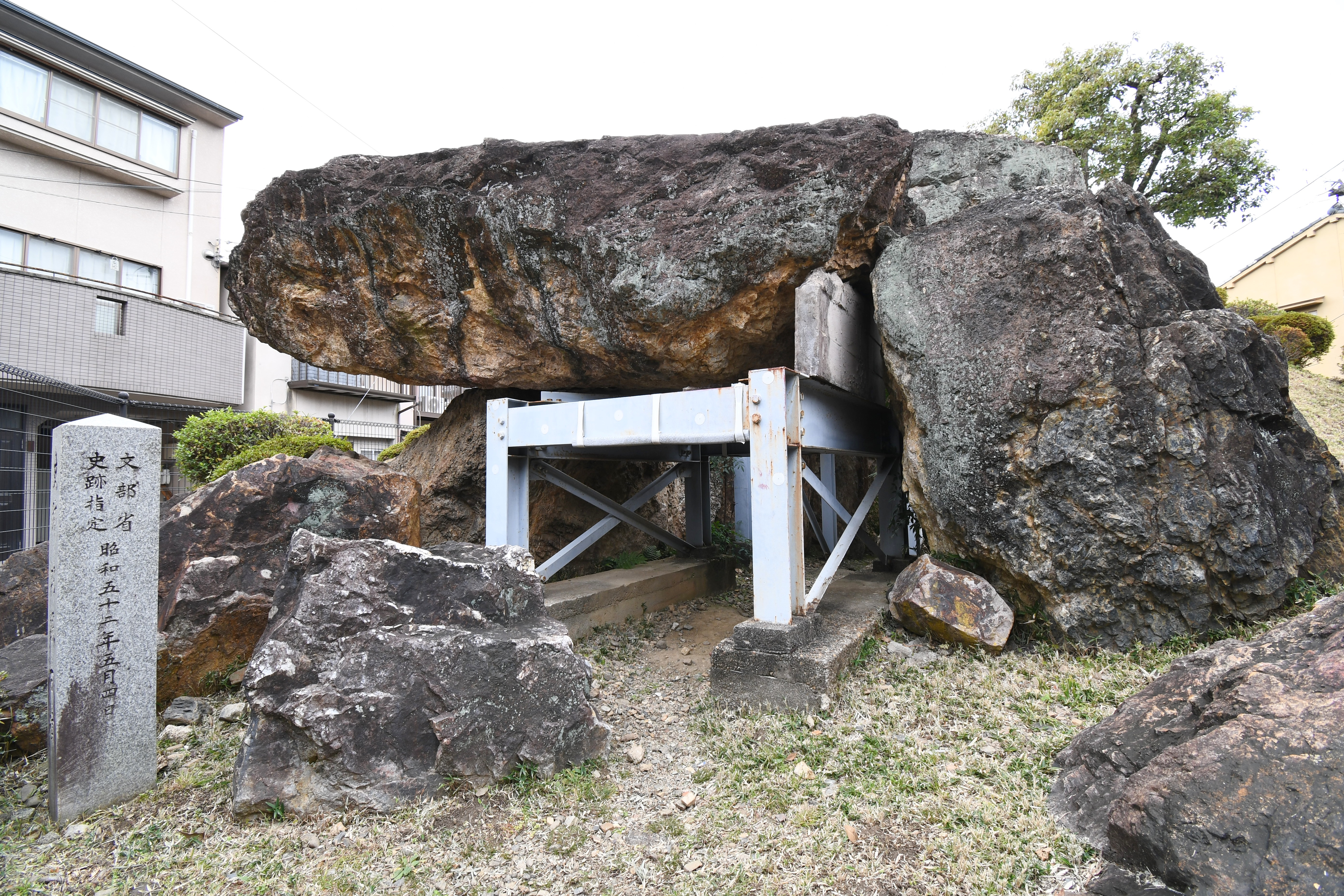
Entrance

== See also ==
- List of Historic Sites of Japan (Kyoto)
