= Large flower mirror =

Type of mirror

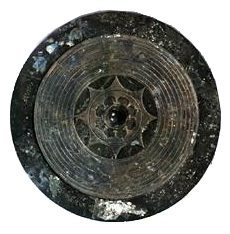
Large-scale insider flower text mirror

A large inward-looking flower mirror (大型内行花文鏡, Ō gatana ikou ka mon kyō) is a type of copper mirror.

== Mirror excavated from the Hirahara Site ==
A large bronze mirror, 46.5cm in diameter, excavated from Tomb No. 1 (Hirahara Yayoi Kofun) at the Hirahara Site, which was identified and excavated in 1965. The excavator, Dairoku Harada, reported that the mirror was not destroyed intentionally, but rather that it had been broken by some accident, and that the pieces of the mirror were collected and buried in four separate places.。

Unlike ordinary mirrors with an inner scrolling floral motif, this bronze mirror has no inscription on the back, but only a design. The design consists of eight leaf-shaped knob heads surrounding a knob at the center of the back of the mirror, surrounded by eight inner rows of floral patterns, nine concentric circles, and an outer rim. The rim of the mirror has approximately 1,500 arc lines running vertically from the back to the front. It is a mirror surface (front).

The excavator, Dairoku Harada, named it Hachiyoha Mirror with Uchigyoka Design because of its design. The number of pieces excavated at the Hirabaru site was reported to be four at the time of discovery and excavation.

Harada reports that the unearthed shards "were able to reconstruct two surfaces in almost perfect condition from the shards at the time of discovery, while only two thirds of the mirror could be reconstructed from shards caught during the excavation by academic research."。Four knobs, the central part of the mirror, were excavated. Based on these facts, Harada concluded that there are four faces of the eight-foil mirror with uchigyo hana design.

During a reexamination in Maebaru City in the Heisei period, one of the four large mirrors (Mirror No. 12) was found to have a fragment of the edge with an unknown joint point with other fragments. Properties, at the request of the Maebara City Board of Education, Isotopes of lead ratio method and Emission Spectroscopy analysis Spectroscopy pointed out the possibility that the shard in question belonged to a different individual than the No. 12 mirror (see (Conclusion based on a comparative analysis test using only Mirror No. 12 in the area).

When the Hirabara site was designated as Important Cultural Property in 1990, the number of bronze mirrors excavated from the Hirabara site was 39 in total, including four large mirrors with uchigyoka designs. However, based on the abovementioned research results, the number of bronze mirrors was increased by one to "40" in the official gazette notification at the time of the 2006 National Treasure designation.。

The 46.5-centimeter diameter of this "eight-leaf mirror" with an uchigyo hana design is "two shaku" in the Han dynasty period, and the circumference of the mirror is "eight ata" in this diameter.

Dairoku Harada noted the similarity between the circumference "yatagata" and the figure "yatagamagami" described in the "Biography of the Gozenzashiki of Ise Nisho Kouta Jingu" in the "Five Books of Shinto", and also noted that the inner diameter of the Ise Grand Shrine ceremony in the "Enki Shiki" and "Kouta Jingu Ritual Book" were "1 shaku 6", which was the same as the inner diameter of the "Ise Grand Shrine ceremony" in the "Engishiki" and "Kouta Jingu Ritual Book". The inner diameter of the tub in the Engishiki is "1 shaku 6 sun 3 min" (about 49 centimeters), which suggests that this bronze mirror is the same type as the Yata no Kagami, the sacred mirror of the Ise Grand Shrine. 。

== See also ==
- Flower Mirror
- Inscribed mirror
