= Inscribed mirror =

Kind of mirror

Inscribed mirror

An inscribed mirror (銘帯鏡, Meitai-kyō; also "variant character inscribed mirror" (異体字銘帯鏡, ita ijime itai kyō)) is a type of Chinese bronze mirror in which an inscription band is the main design on the reverse side. The name variant characters (異体字, itaiji) refers to the unique design of the inscription, but they are sometimes simply called an inscribed mirror (銘帯鏡, Meitai-kyō).

Okamura Hidenori attributes the mirror type to the late Pre-Han period, from the early 1st century BC to the early 1st century CE

They entered Japan in the mid- to late Yayoi period, mainly through northern Kyushu, and were later produced in Japan. Not all mirrors with Chinese character inscriptions fall into this category but rather ones with variant characters (異体字, itaiji) with specific characteristics are considered to be in the category.

== Definition ==
Western Han example

Takayasu Higuchi defines it as "a mirror with a circular knob (a projection through which a string is threaded in the center of the mirror) as its center, divided by several spherical bands, and with inscriptions on the divided bands. The inscriptions are often in a unique character style, and are considered to be a mirror style in which the inscriptions are designed. There are three types of character styles: small seal typeface, cuneiform typeface, and East Asian Gothic typeface. There are three types of knob seating (the pattern around the knob): a bead pattern seat, a circle seat, and a four-leaf seat. The periphery is often bare with no pattern, but the width varies with age.

== Research History ==
In 1920, Kenzo Tomioka revealed that this type of mirror style dates back to the Predynastic period. Then in 1926, Goto Shuichi proposed a nomenclature based on inscriptions, but he could not cope with a wide range of inscriptions and corrected the imperfection himself. A report published in 1959 by Luoyang Shaogou Han Tomb classified the excavated mirrors of this type into three types: the Nikko mirror, the Shomei mirror, and the Lian arc pattern mirror, and identified these as the mirror type that appeared next to the nebular pattern mirror and preceded the TLV mirror. It was Higuchi, who wrote "Kogamyo" in 1979, who established the categorization. The mirrors had previously been classified into two types, but he attempted a more detailed classification by using the common element of having variant characters as a single type of mirror.

In the 1990s, Hiroaki Takakura classified the burials excavated from jar coffin tombs in northern Kyushu during the middle Yayoi period into three groups. The first group was defined as large Chinese mirrors, such as the Seibaku mirror, accompanied by bronze weapons, the second group as mainly Seibaku mirrors accompanied by iron weapons, and the third group as small inscribed banded mirrors accompanied by iron weapons, with the second and third groups being tombs dating to the late Middle Yayoi period and the first group to an earlier period. In the 1990s, Okamura identified the third mirror type as being produced during the Han mirror period (early to mid 1st century BC), and stated that no other mirror types were produced during this period, but later excavations revealed a mirror with a nebula design and a mirror with a dragon design accompanying it, suggesting that other mirror types were also produced in parallel.

Okamura (1985) who said that the inscription "attracted attention because of its strict ascetic attitude," attributes it to social change, while Ishikawa Misao (1991) says that it expresses sorrow for the dead and is connected to a postmortem view of the dead.

== Mirror excavation ==
As of 2000, there are 786 mirrors with variant inscriptions. Of these, 56 sites and 152 mirrors were excavated in Japan.。As with other mirror types, it is possible to classify the variant inscribed band mirrors according to their face diameters. Takakura attributed this difference to the period of production, but as of 2000, it is considered to be a grading based on the surface diameter. There have been few examples of banded mirrors with inscriptions in variant characters larger than 15 cm excavated from the tombs of the kings of the Former Han dynasty. These mirrors are not only large, but also have few omissions of inscriptions and are carefully polished. On the other hand, the 10 cm or so pieces, which make up the majority of excavated pieces, are sometimes poorly made.

In Japan, the earliest known excavation is thought to be from the Sanyumo Minamikoji Ruins, which dates to the mid to late Yayoi period. The variant Chinese inscribed banded mirror excavated here is large, as are the other accompanying Chinese mirrors, and it is assumed to have been acquired specially. More than 20 inscribed mirrors were excavated at Suku Okamoto Ruins D, and 10 inscribed mirrors were excavated at the Tateiwa Ruins

By the first half of the Late Yayoi period, the Ariake Sea coastal areas spread widely to Nagasaki, Oita, Chugoku region, and Shikoku. These mirrors are characterized by the absence of large mirrors and the absence of accompanying mirror styles, such as the rectangular-shaped rectangular mirrors that followed. In the late Yayoi period, small Japanese mirrors made in the Yayoi period that imitated Yayoi inscribed banded mirrors began to be produced mainly at the Suku Okamoto site.

Based on the above aspects, Nishikawa speculates that the influx of variant inscribed banded mirrors from China correlates with the emergence of social disparities such as base settlements, very large buildings, and huge tombs that began to appear around the middle Yayoi period, and that a reorganization of social structure took place around the same time.

== See also ==
- Flower Mirror
- Large Flower Mirror
- Mirrors in Shinto

== Bibliography ==
書籍

- 樋口隆康 (1979). 古鏡. 新潮社.
- 南健太郎 (2019). 東アジアの銅鏡と弥生社会. 同成社. ISBN 978-4-88621-819-3.
- 洛陽区考古発掘隊; 中国科学院考古研究所 (1959). 洛陽焼溝漢墓. 科学出版社.

論文など

- 岡村秀典 (1984). "前漢鏡の編年と様式". 史林. 67–5. 史学研究会.
- 西川寿勝 (2000). "2000年前の舶載鏡--異体字銘帯鏡と弥生の王". 日本考古学. 10号. 日本考古学協会.

== See also ==
- Han mirror
