= Bronze mirror =

Reflective object made of bronze or copper

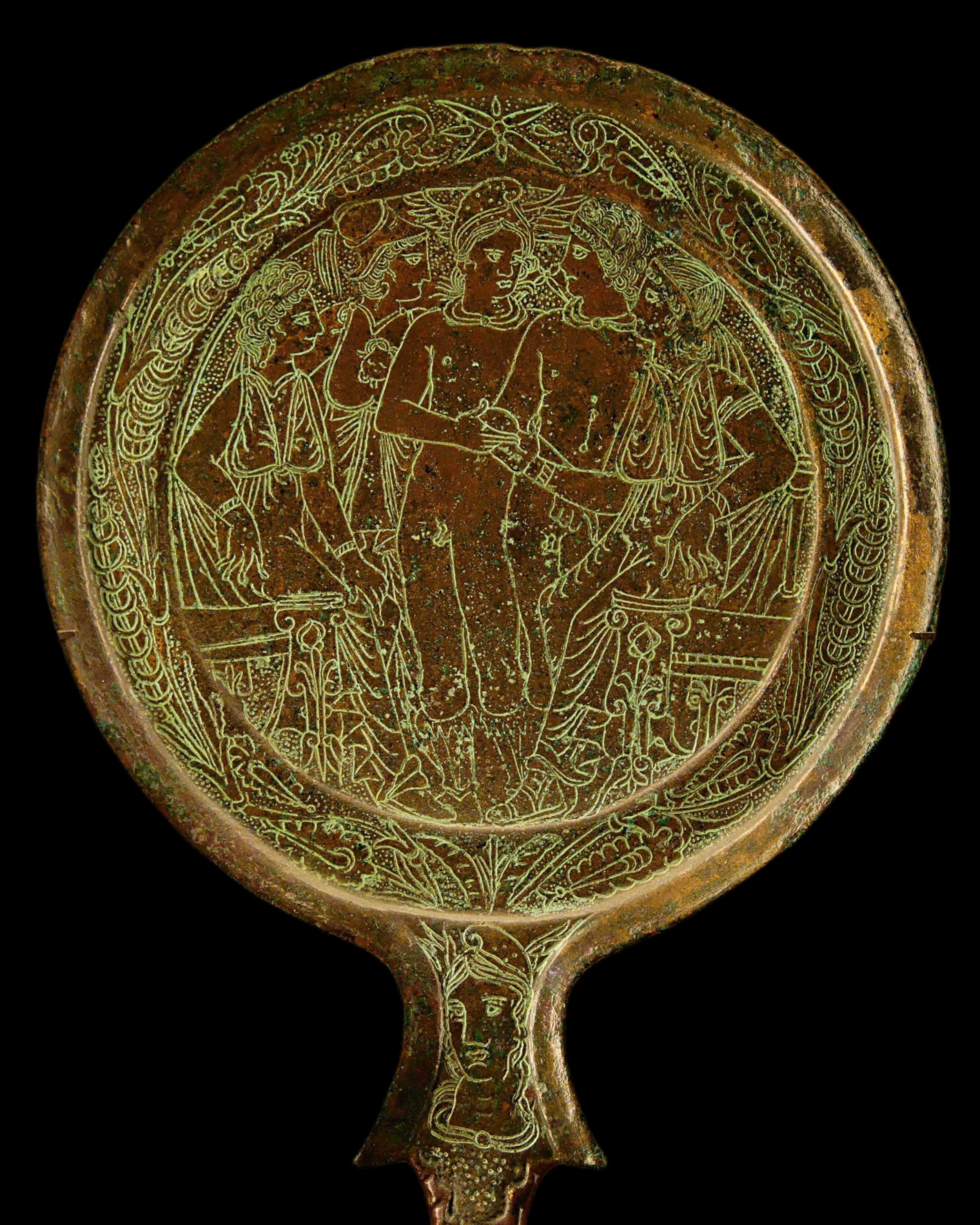
Etruscan mirror back incised with the Judgement of Paris, 4th–3rd century BCE (Musée du Louvre)

Bronze mirrors preceded the glass mirrors of today. This type of mirror, sometimes termed a copper mirror, has been found by archaeologists among elite assemblages from various cultures, from Etruscan Italy to Japan. Typically they are round and rather small, in the West with a handle, in East Asia with a knob to hold at the back, often with a loop for a cord, or silk tassel. Some were fitted with small stands, and others had a hinged protective cover. In surviving ancient examples the surface is too corroded to be reflective, but some bronze mirrors are still made.

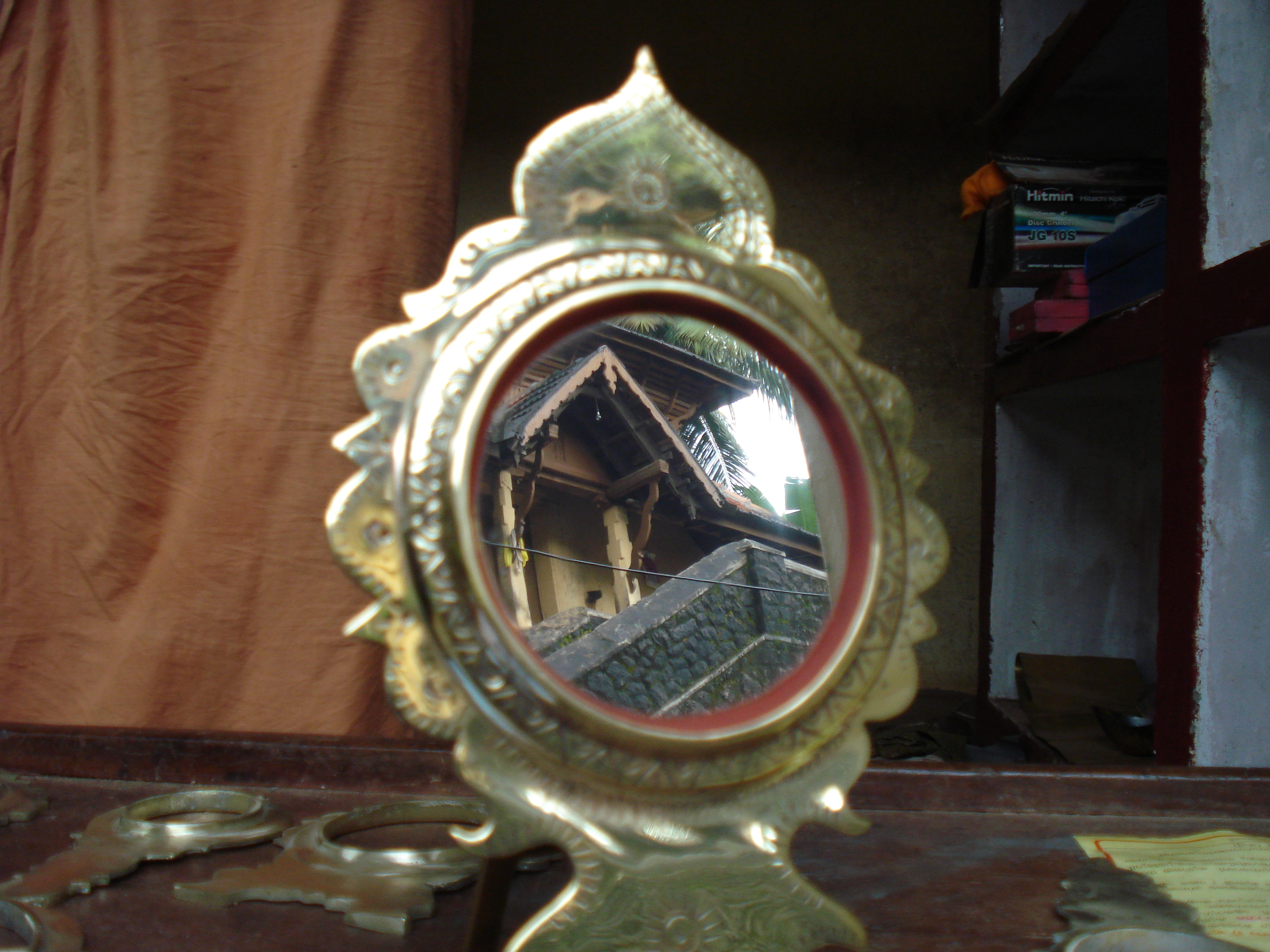
Newly-made Aranmula Kannadi, Kerala, India

They are first-surface mirrors, where the immediate bronze surface is flat, plain and highly polished to be reflective, rather than second-surface mirrors, like modern glass mirrors, where the reflection comes from a backing applied to the glass.

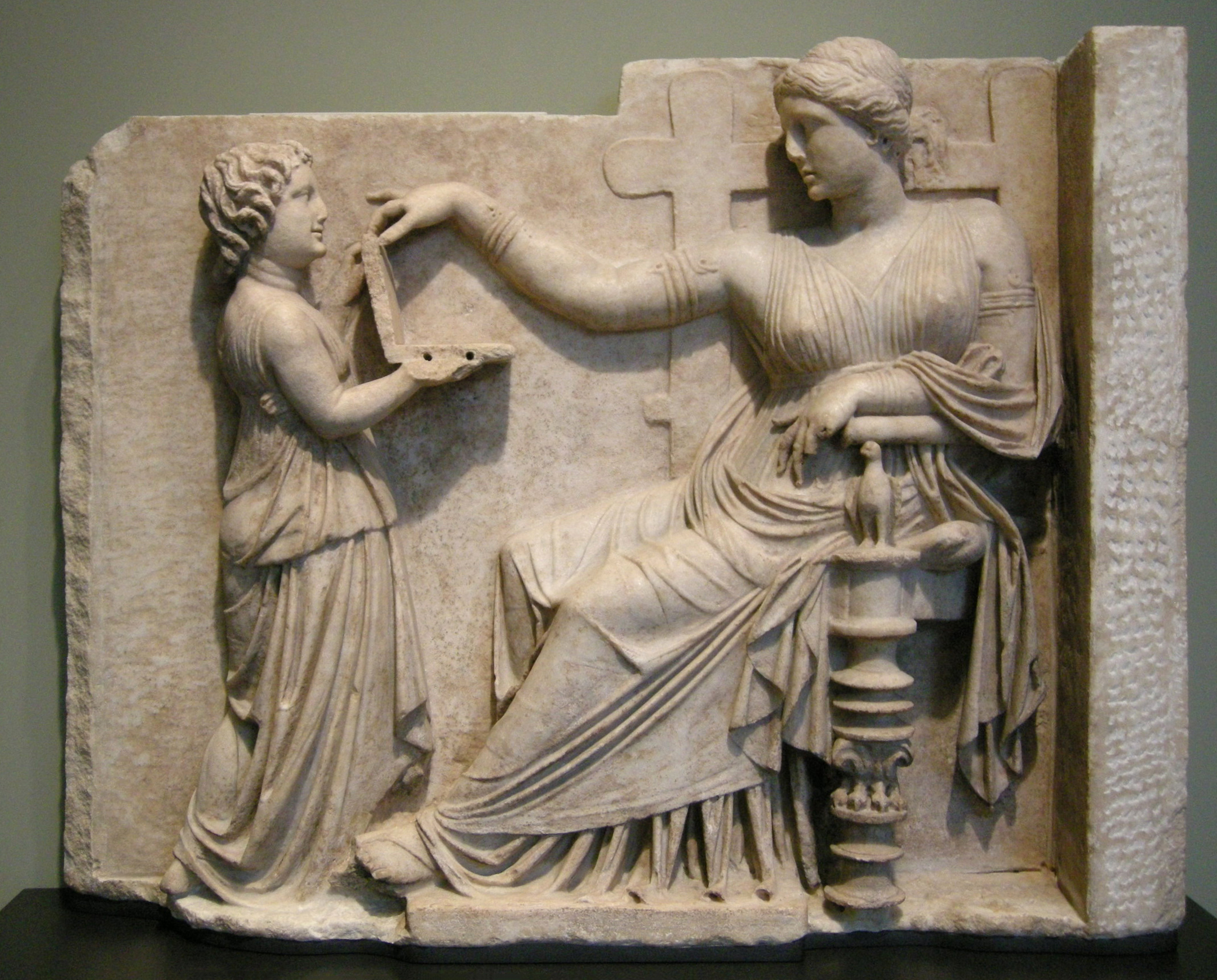
Maid holding folding mirror for her mistress, Greece, c. 100 BCE

They are significantly inferior to modern mirrors in terms of the quality of the reflection, but in older societies were sufficiently impressive to have religious significance in some societies. Examples include the melong in Tibetan Buddhism and the toli in Asian Shamanism. The ancient Greeks and others used mirrors for divining, and the Chinese believed they stored sunlight, and so could "guide the deceased through the underworld", making them essential grave-goods.

The back is often highly decorated in various techniques and styles, and may be significant for art history. Chinese styles include the Flower Mirror, TLV mirror and Inscribed mirror, while the Large Flower Mirror and Shinju-kyo are Japanese. Most ancient images show them being used by women, and figurative imagery on the back, as in Roman mirrors, often reflects female interests.

== History ==
Bronze mirrors were themselves preceded by mirrors made of obsidian (volcanic glass), found across the Middle East. These remained the standard in the Americas until the arrival of Europeans. Iron pyrite was also used. Glass mirrors with superior reflectivity began to be made in the Roman Empire in the 1st century CE, but remained very expensive for a long time, as well as easy to break, and initially hardly any more reflective, so that bronze mirrors remained common in many parts of the world until the 19th century.

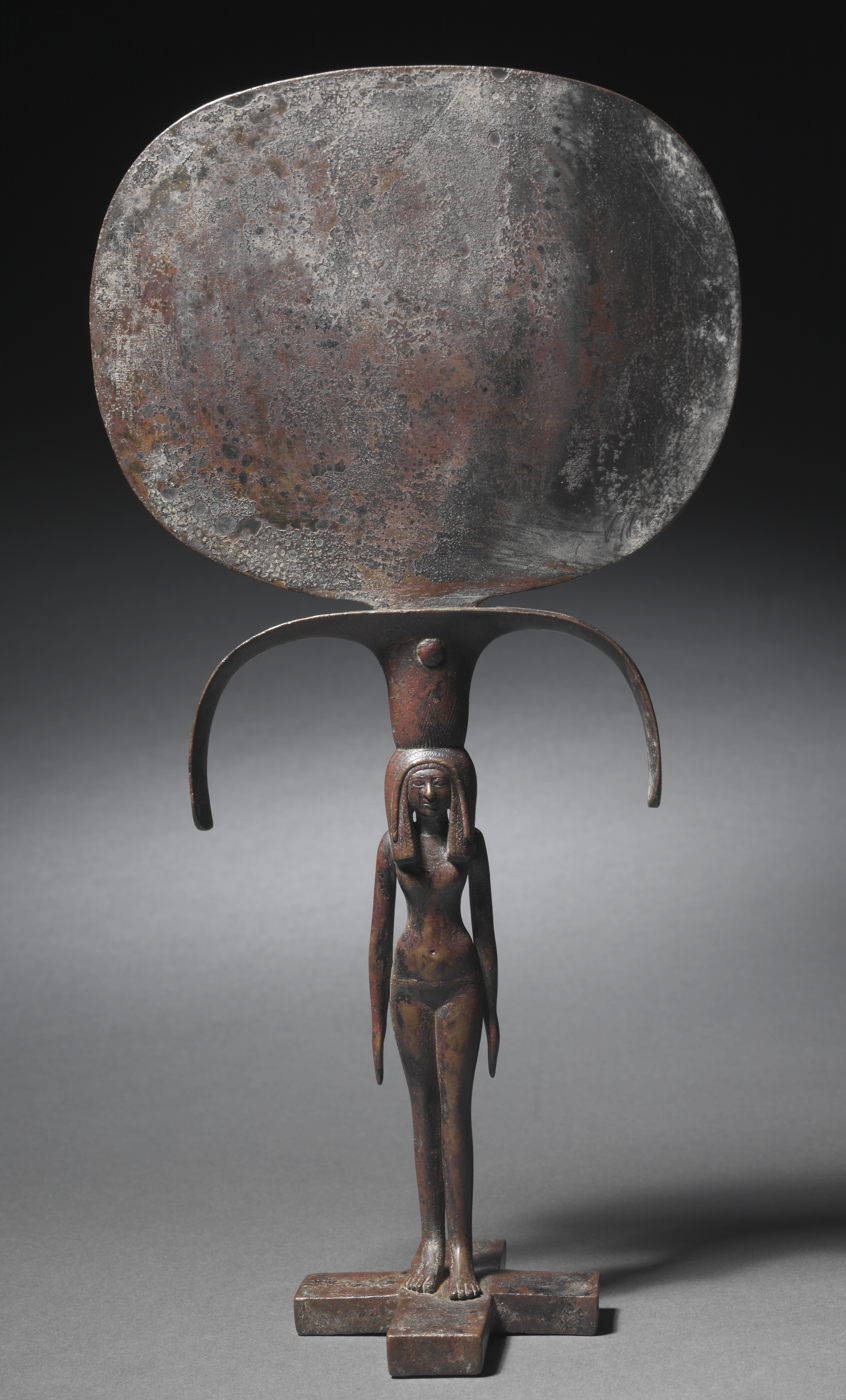
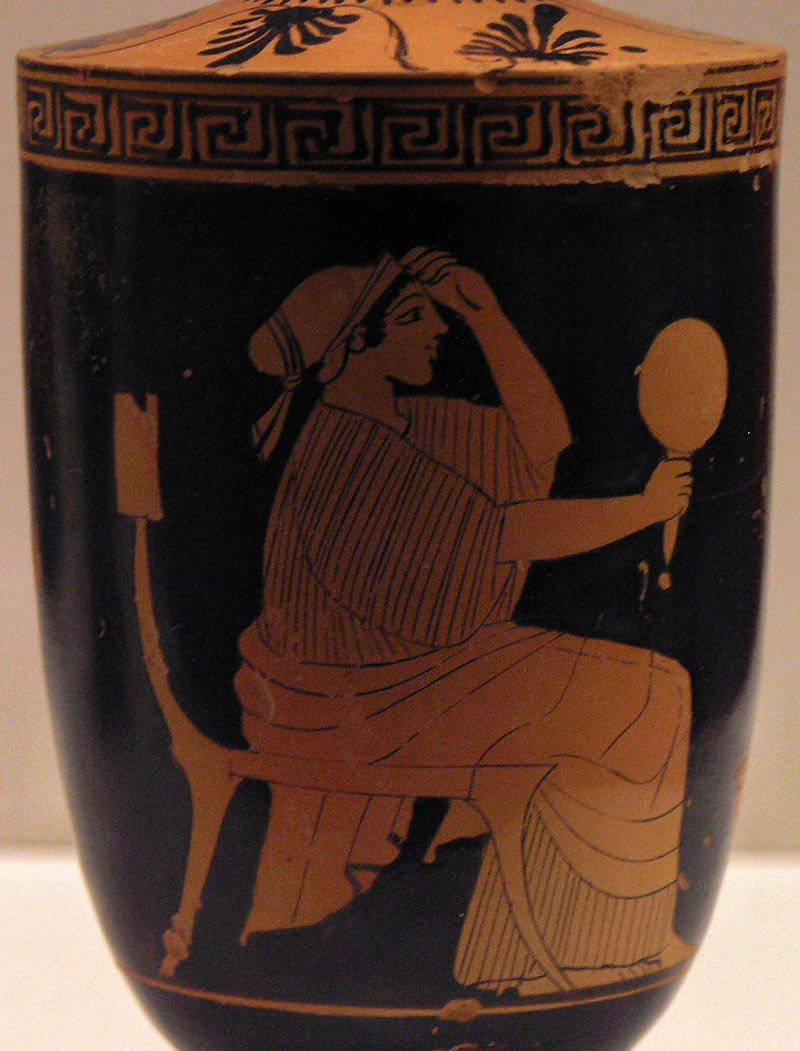
Left: Bronze mirror with stand, New Kingdom of Egypt, 18th Dynasty, 1540–1296 BC
Right: Seated woman holding a mirror; Ancient Greek Attic red-figure lekythos, c. 470–460 BC

Speculum metal is a very hard high-tin bronze-type alloy, with about 30% tin rather than the typical 12–15%. It polishes well to give very good reflectivity, and was important in Early Modern telescopes and other uses. Its use in mirrors may date back more than 2000 years in China although it could also be an invention of western civilizations. There seem to be references to it by Pliny the Elder. It was certainly in use by the European Middle Ages, giving better reflectivity than the usual bronze, and tarnishing more slowly. However, tin was expensive, and the composition of the alloy had to be controlled precisely. Confusingly, mirrors made of speculum metal were known at the time, and often later, as "steel mirrors", although they had no steel in them.

=== Egypt and Near East ===
Polished bronze mirrors were made by the Egyptians from 2900 BCE onwards. These Egyptian mirrors are spoken of in biblical Book of Exodus (1500 BCE), and used by Moses in the construction of the Tabernacle.

=== China ===
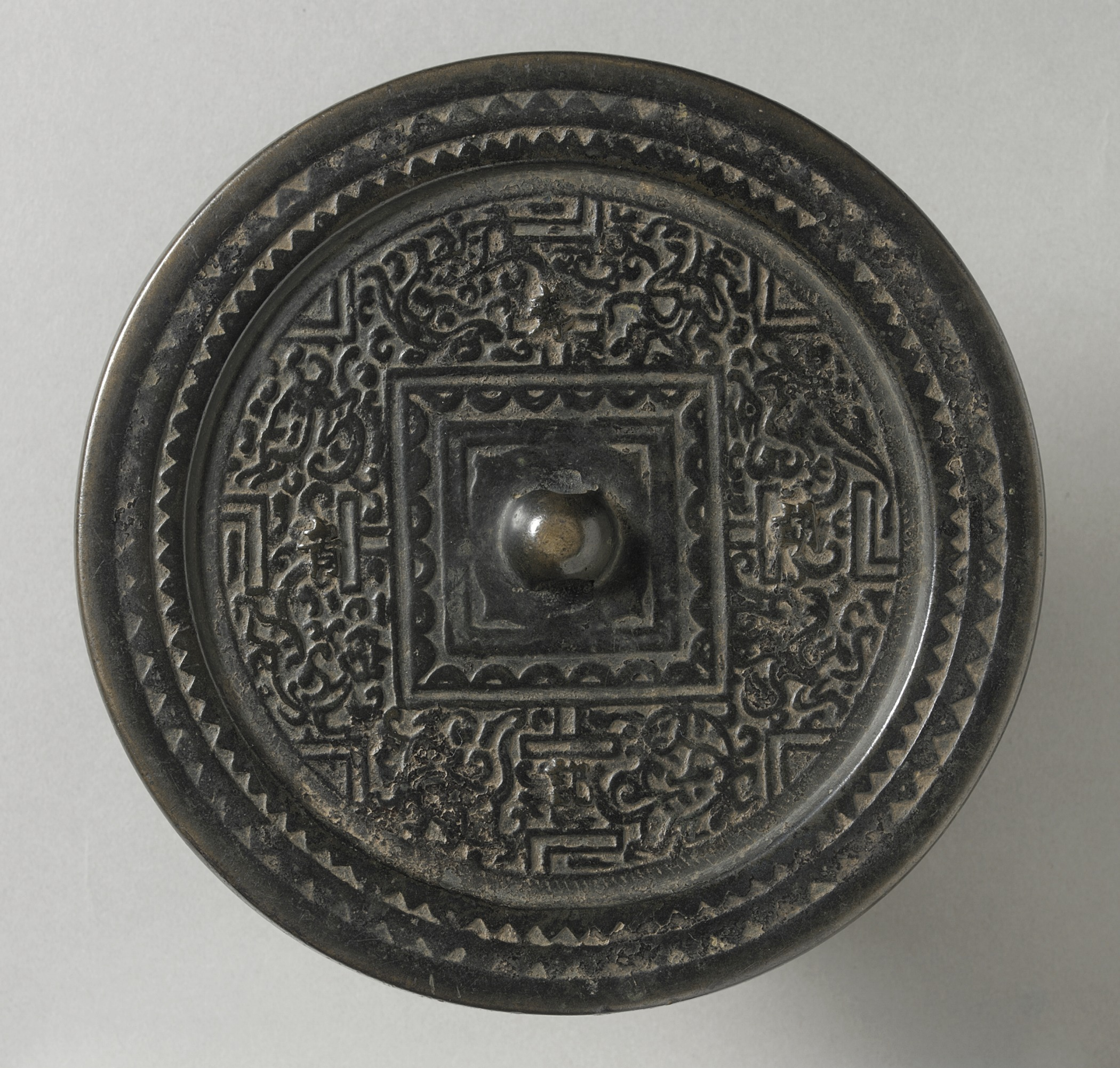
An Eastern Han-period TLV mirror, 25–220 CE

Bronze mirrors were produced in China from Neolithic times until Western glass mirrors were brought to China. Bronze mirrors were usually circular, with one side polished bright, to give a reflection, and the reverse side normally decorated in cast relief in early examples, later on sometimes inlaid in precious metal. They generally had a knob or loop in the center of the back so that they could be easily held in the hand, and sometimes attached to clothing. In the Tang and Song dynasties some examples were larger and more variable in shape. Other examples are so small, about 5 cm across, that they may have been mainly intended for ritual use, as "charms to ward off evil spirits".

Some of the earliest examples of Chinese bronze mirrors belonged to the late Neolithic Qijia culture from around 2000 BCE (some use of bronze is found before the Bronze Age, when it became general for some types of objects). However, until Warring States times, bronze mirrors were not common with approximately only twenty having been discovered. During the Warring States period, mirrors became particularly popular. During the Han dynasty (202 BCE – 220 CE) mirrors started to be mass-produced in standardised designs, including the TLV mirror. Some Western Han dynasty mirrors featured intricate inlays using silver, gold, glass, and lead–barium silicates, a synthetic material resembling jade, to enhance visual appeal and symbolic value. Both Han and Tang mirrors are considered to be the most technically advanced. Both the quantity and quality of finds in graves declined after the Tang dynasty, but bronze mirrors continued to remain popular up through the Song dynasty, but then gradually lost their popularity and ceased to be produced after the arrival of Western mirrors during the Ming and Qing dynasties.

Specific types include the inscribed mirror, Flower Mirror and Large Flower Mirror.

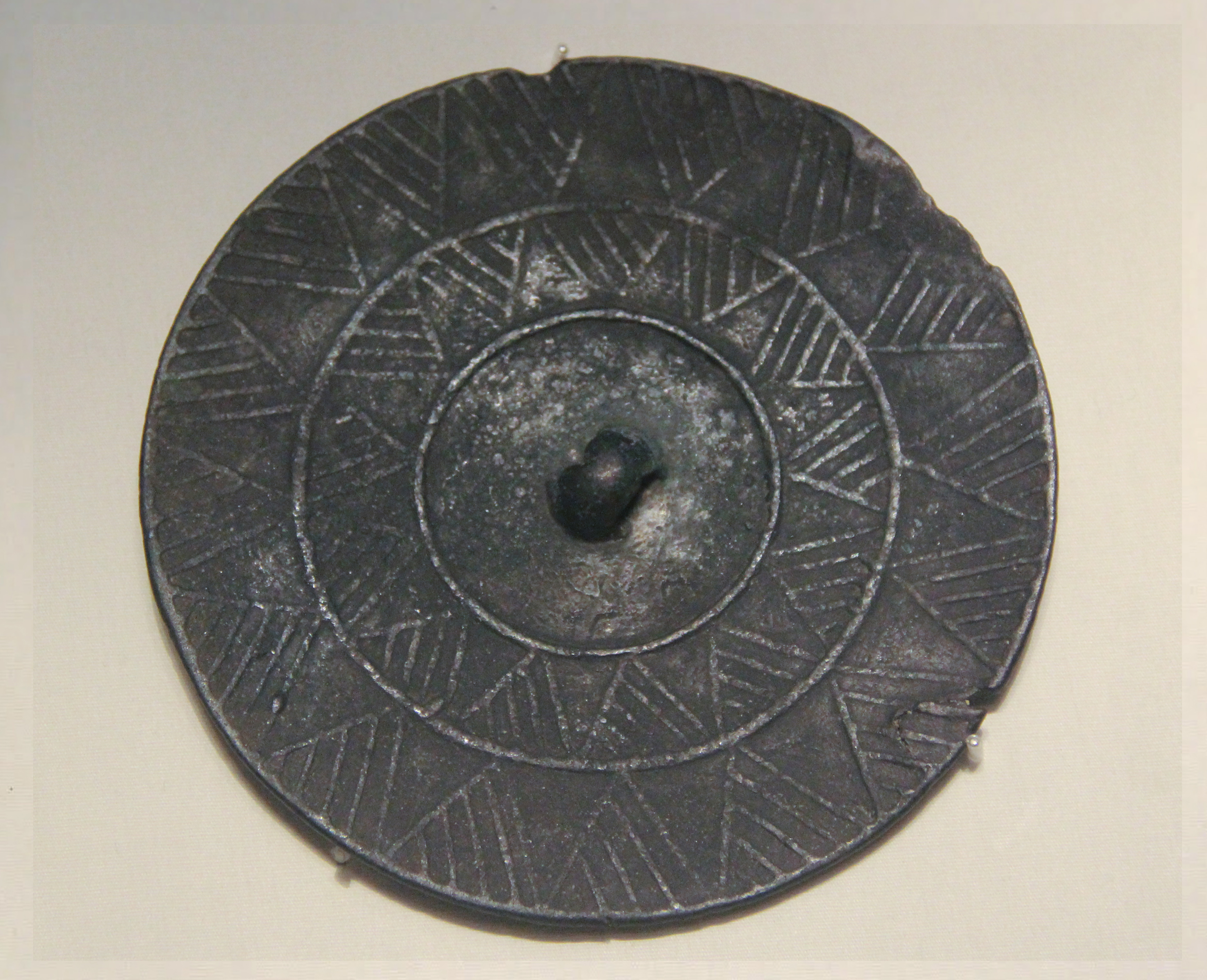
Early mirror, Qijia culture, before c. 1800 BCE

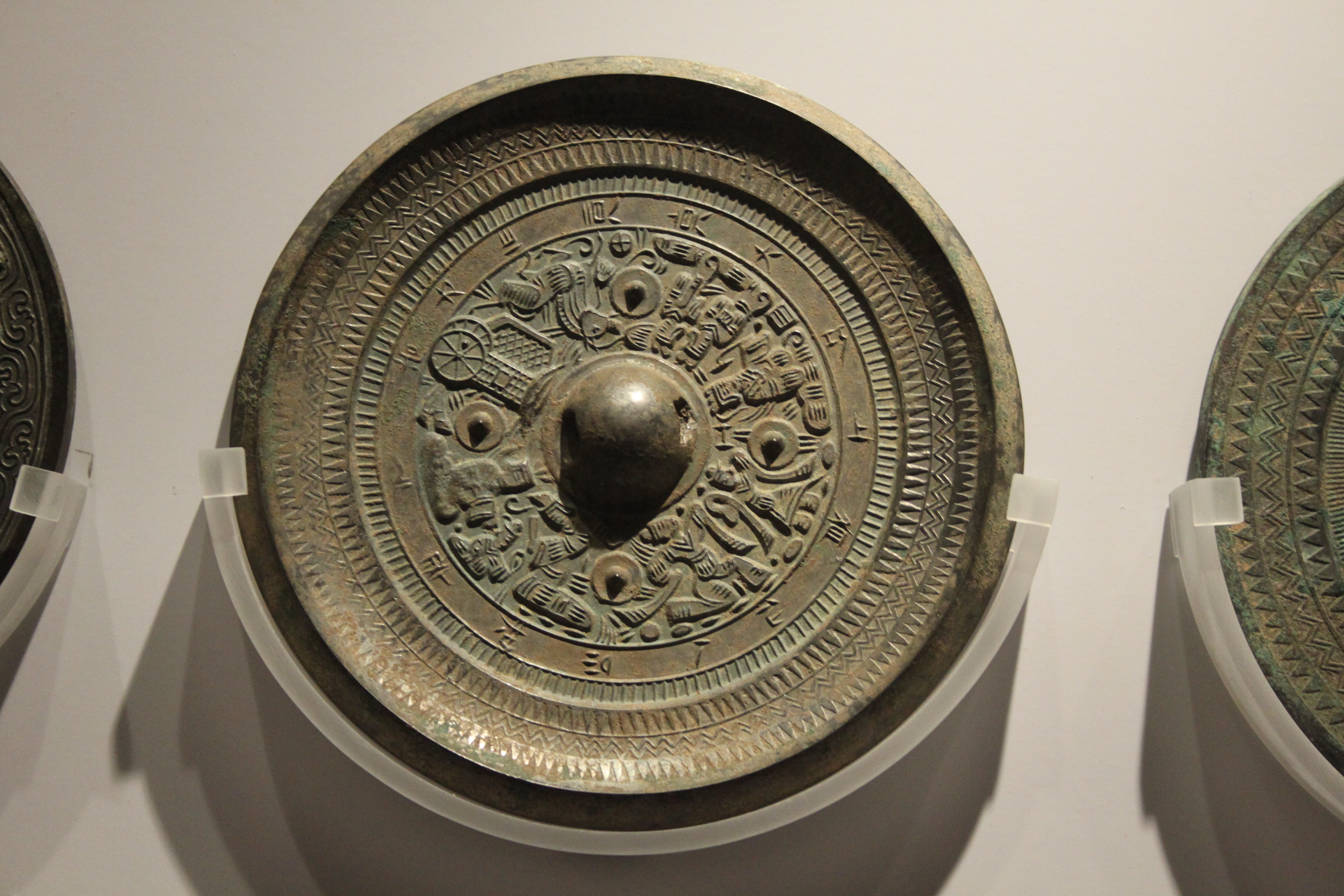
Han dynasty, 202 BC – 9 AD, 25–220 AD

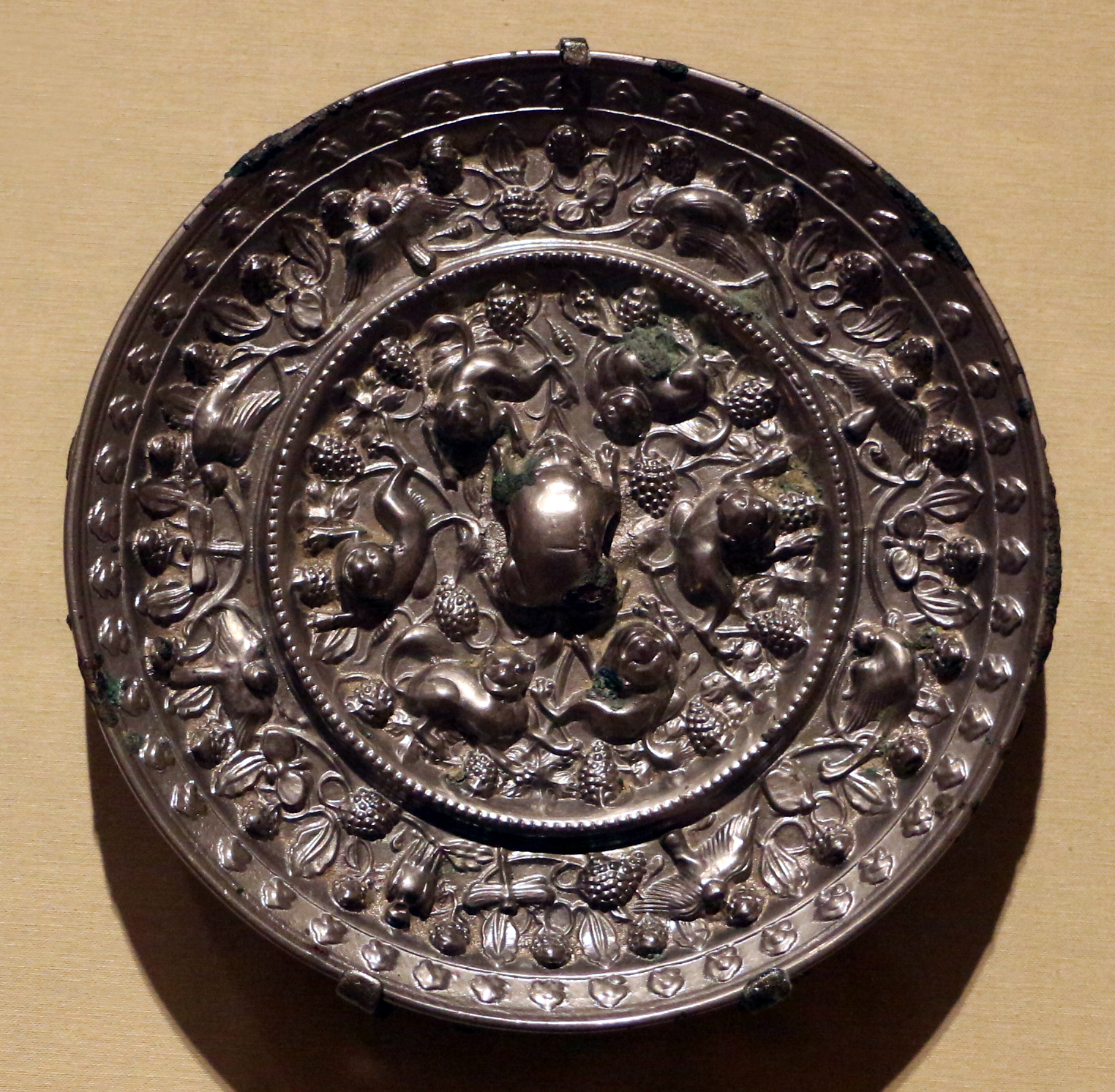
The "animals and grapes design", c. 690, Tang dynasty

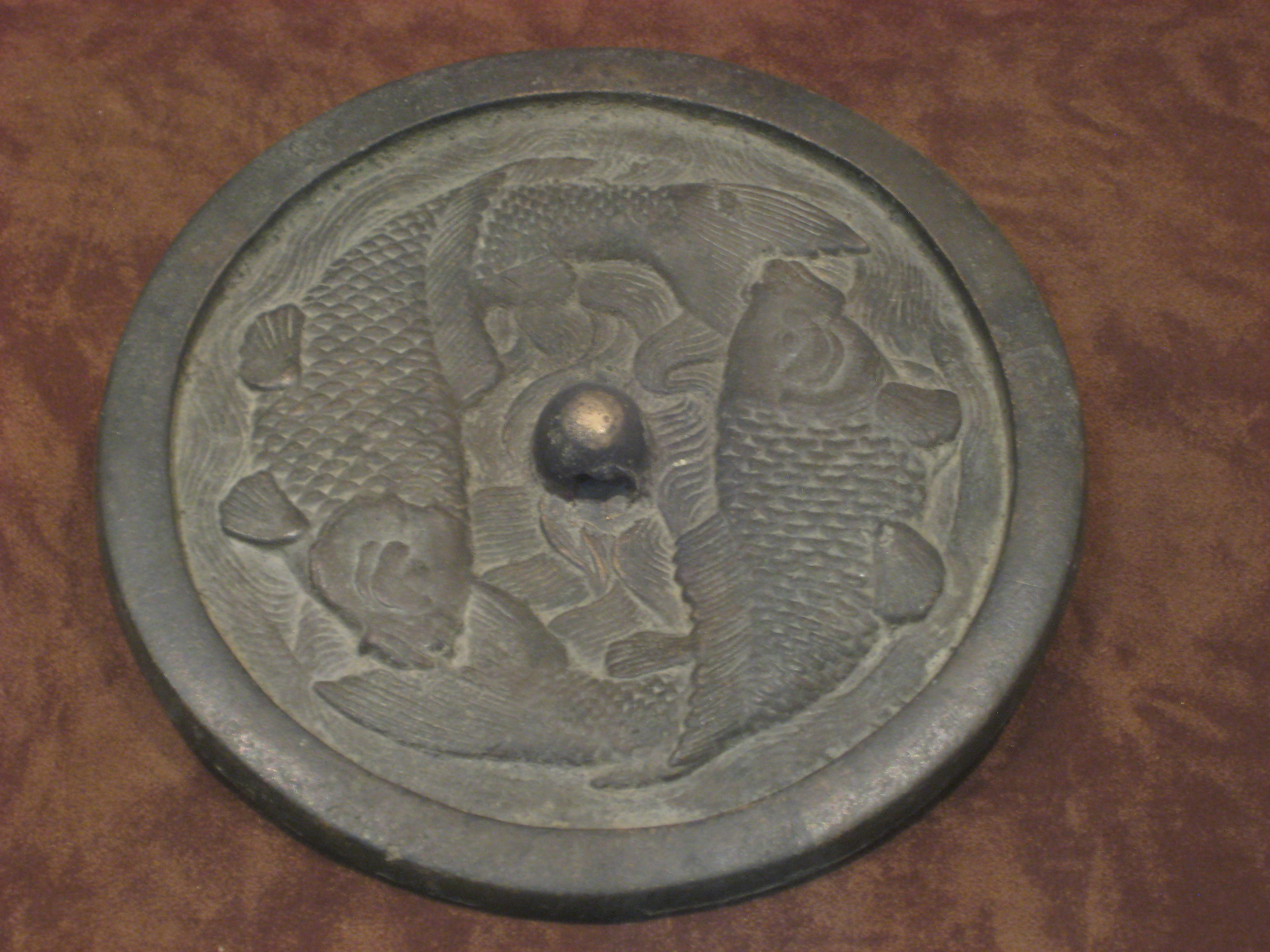
The "double fish design", popular in the Jin dynasty (1115-1234)

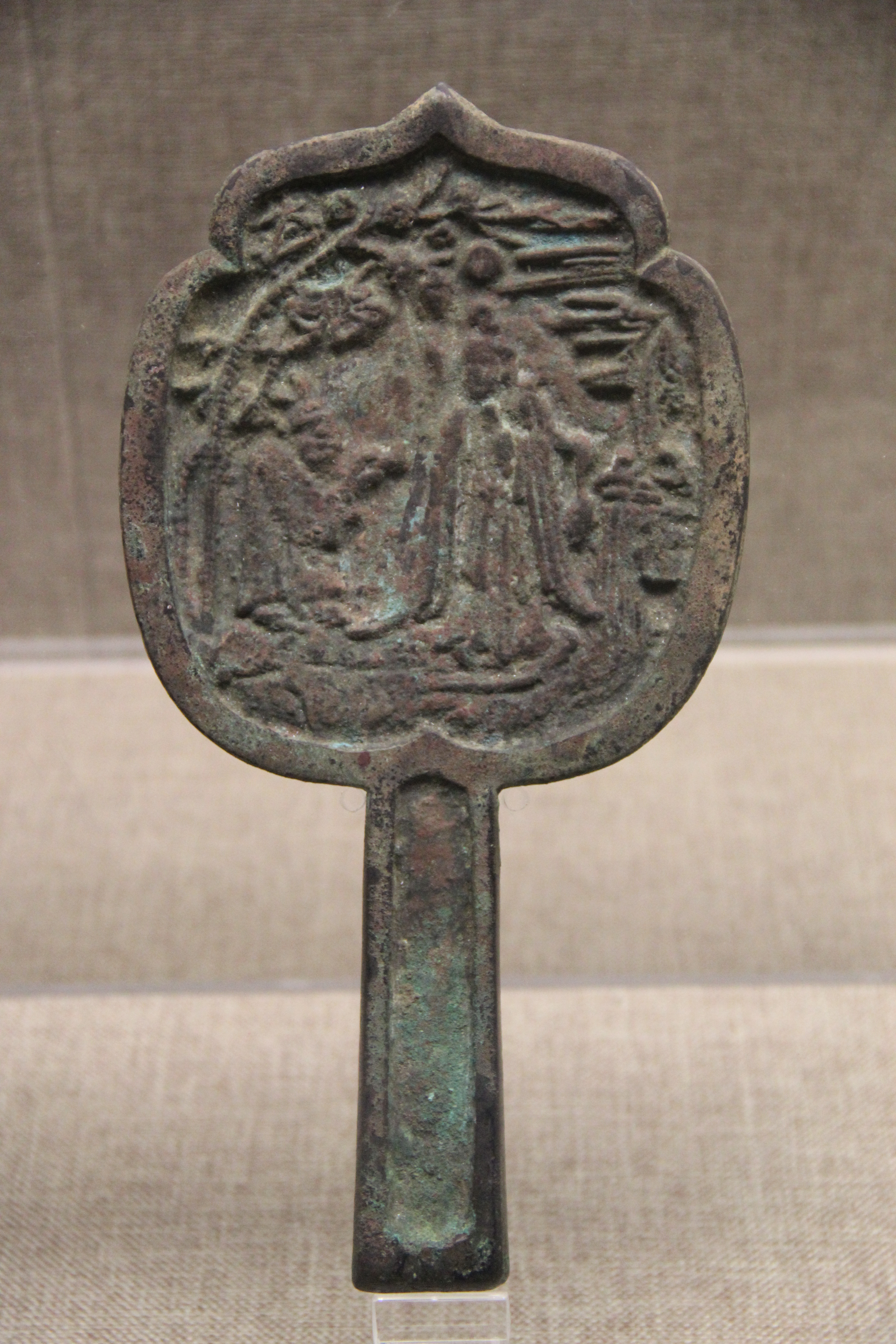
Song dynasty

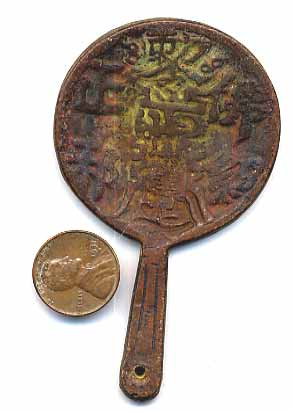
Very small hand mirror

=== Europe ===
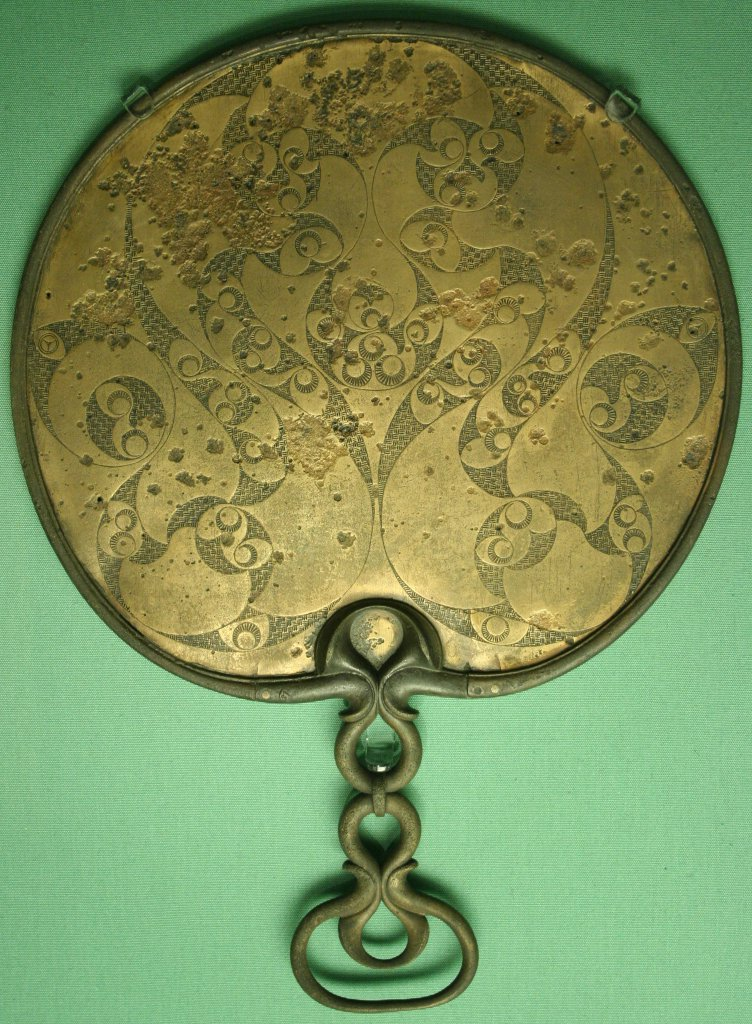
The Desborough Mirror, English, c. 50 BCE — 50 CE

The Bronze Age Minoan civilization produced hand-mirrors in the 2nd millennium BCE, followed by the Myceneans. They were no doubt following the Egyptian or Near Eastern precedents. After disappearing in the Greek Dark Ages, they returned in Archaic Greece, including some mirrors on elaborate stands (already an Egyptian type), as well as hand-mirrors with handles. The stands most often featured a standing female figure, often with putti. These are called "caryatid mirrors".

Folding mirrors, also called "box mirrors", from about 400 BCE, typically had relief designs on the outside of the lid, and engraved decoration on the inside. Most were still round, and lacked handles, presumably as they were meant to be held by a maid. Eros/Cupid is often shown holding up a mirror for Aphrodite/Venus.

In the early periods, designs were typically engraved on the back, but luxury Greco-Roman mirrors often had figurative designs in relief.

Mirrors from the Iron Age have been discovered across most of Europe, generally as grave-goods. The Greeks were the earliest makers; the Etruscans imported Greek mirrors, and then began making their own, passing the practice on to their Roman conquerors.

In the 1st century CE Seneca mentioned large wall mirrors; it may have been in front of one of these that Demosthenes used to practise his speeches in the 4th century BCE. The rich had silver or silver-plated mirrors.

Celtic mirrors in Britain were produced up until the Roman conquest. Notable examples include the Desborough Mirror, and those found in Birdlip and Langton Herring.

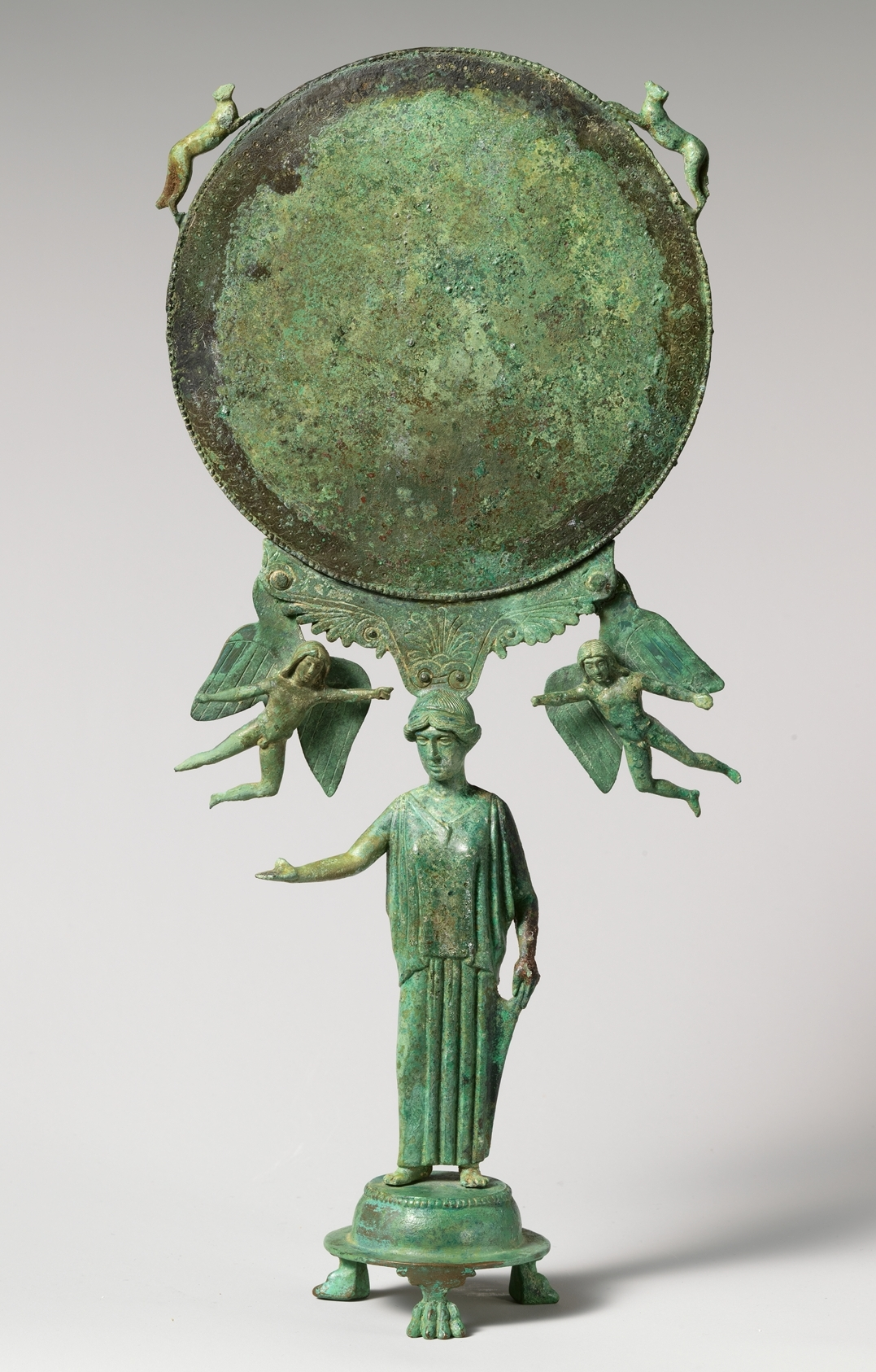
Greek caryatid mirror, mid-5th century BCE

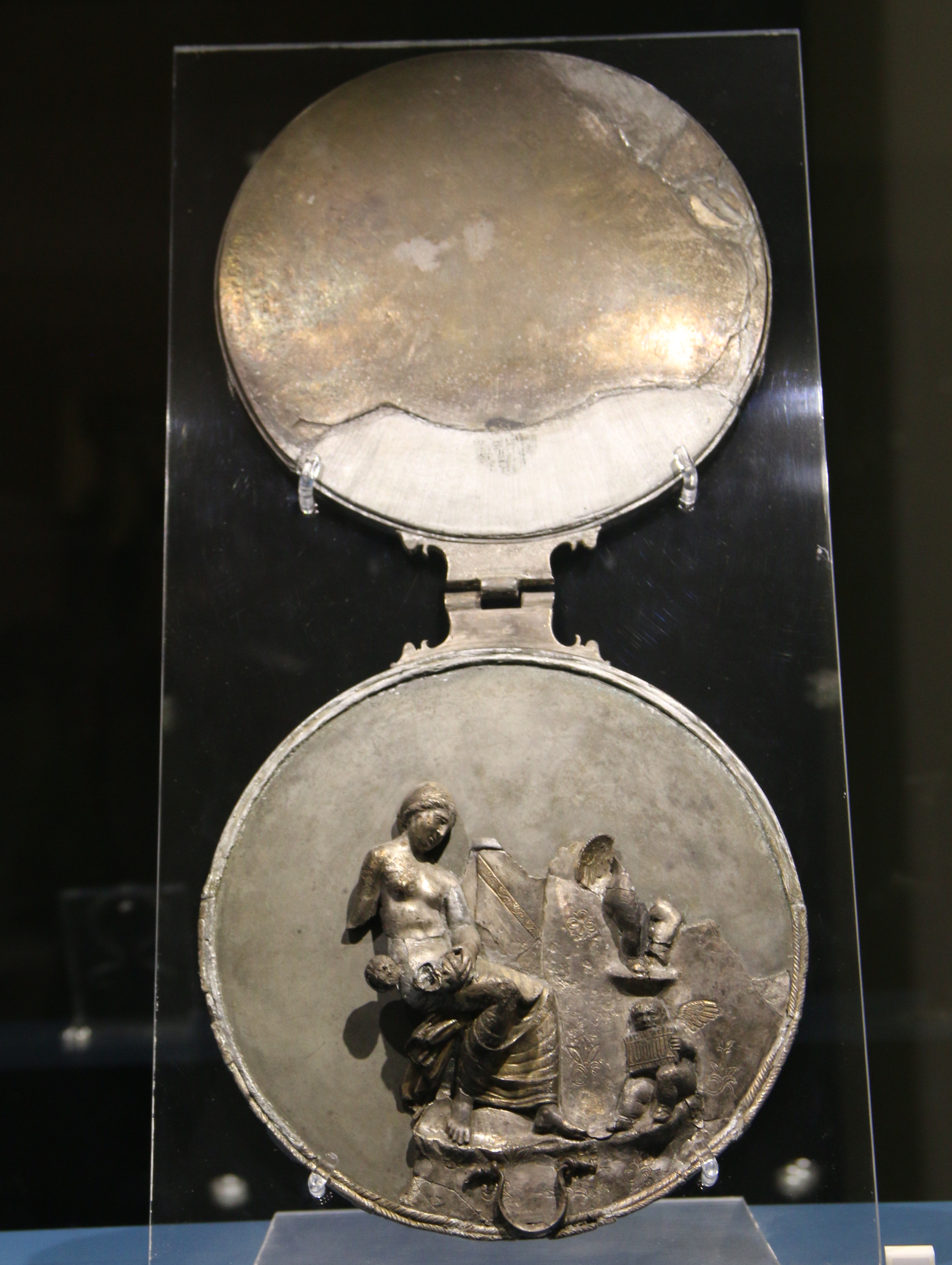
Greek folding mirror (found in Italy), 3rd century BCE, with Eros playing for Aphrodite

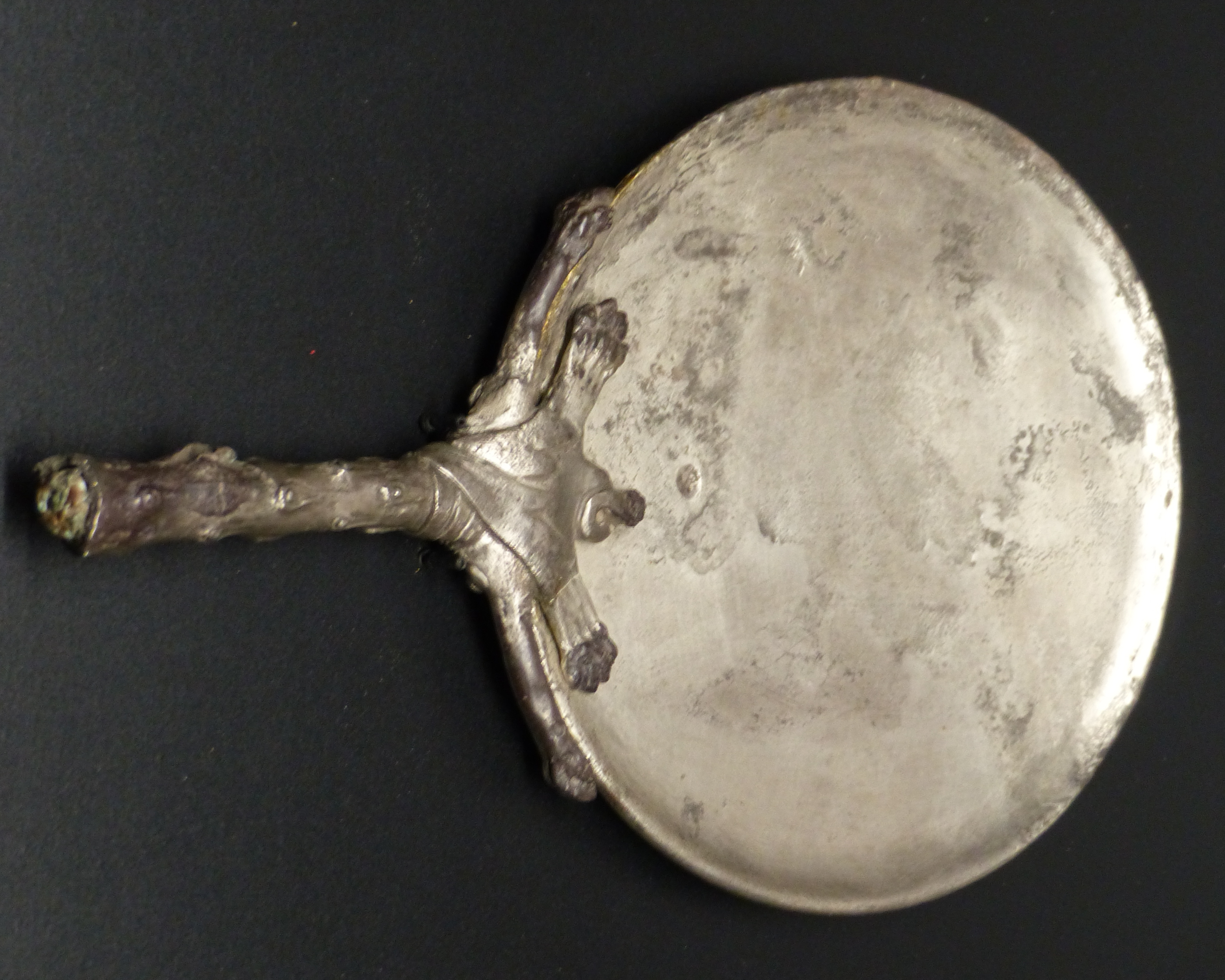
Front of silver Roman mirror from Pompeii

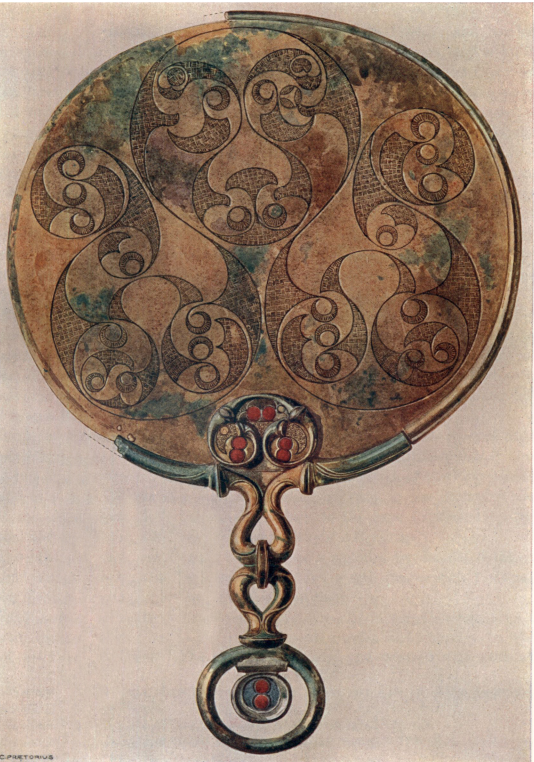
The Birdlip Mirror, English, early 1st-century BC.

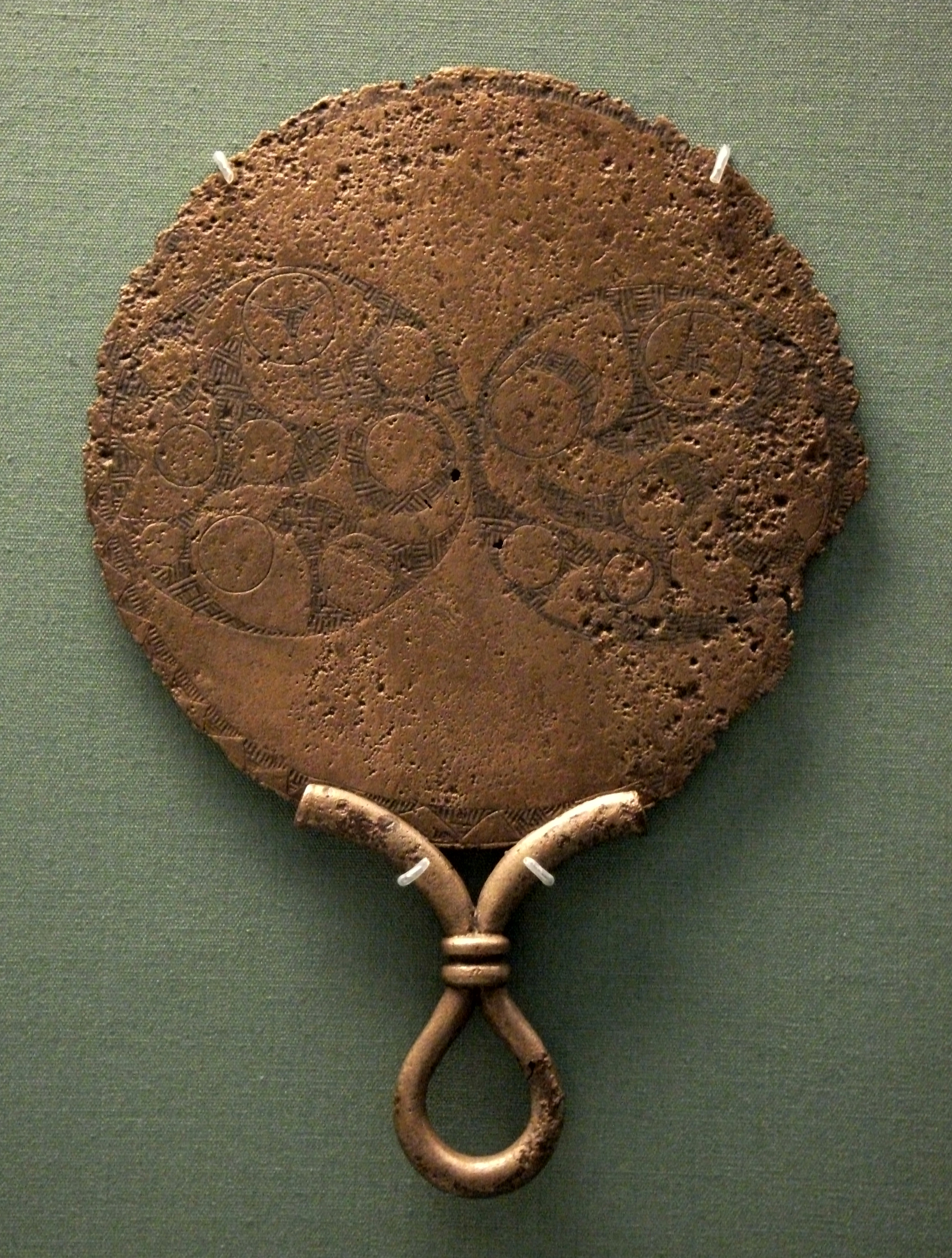
An Iron Age bronze mirror with Celtic decoration from 120 to 80 BCE. Found in St Keverne, England

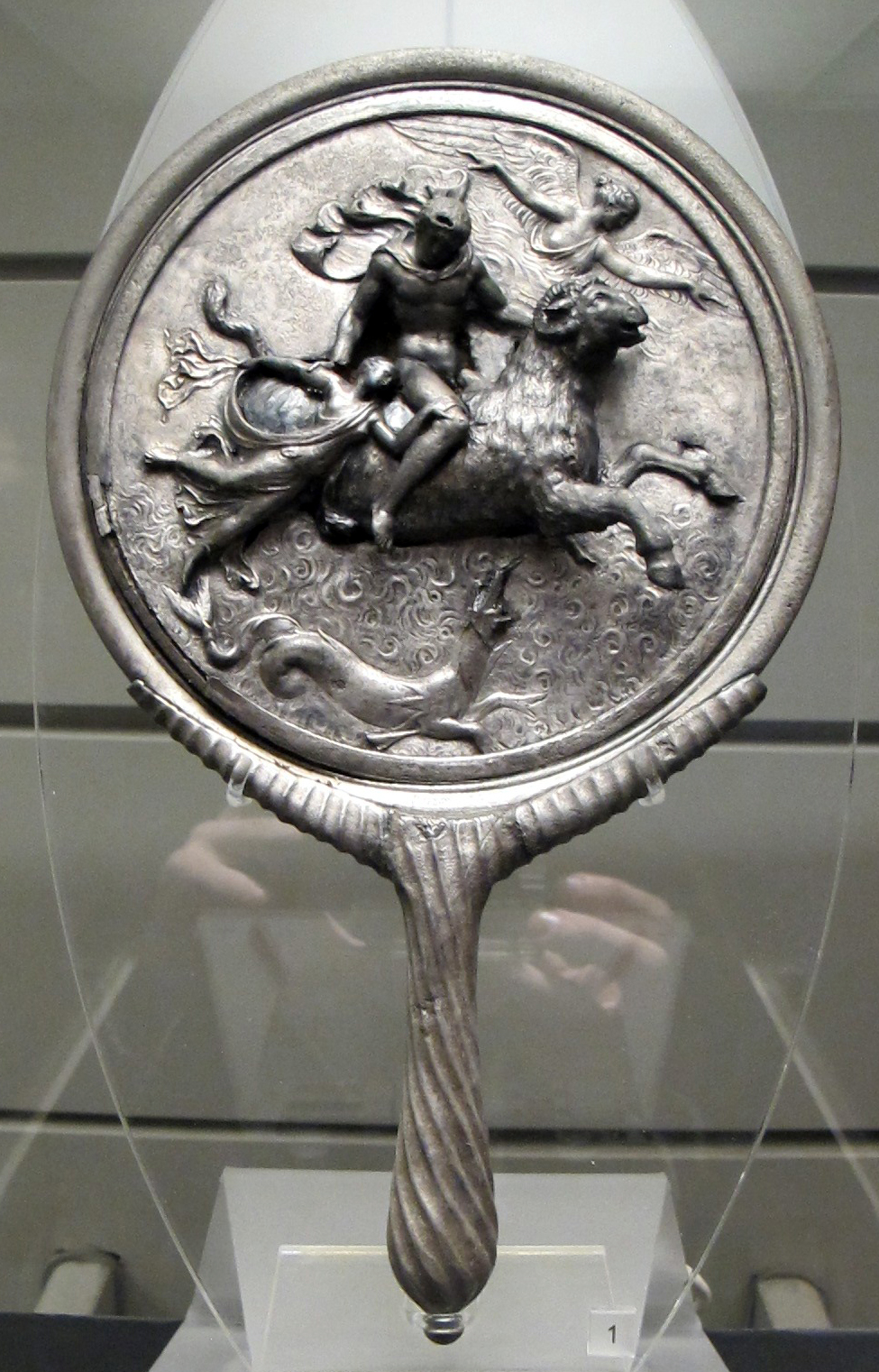
Silver, Roman, 150-200 CE, with unusually high relief

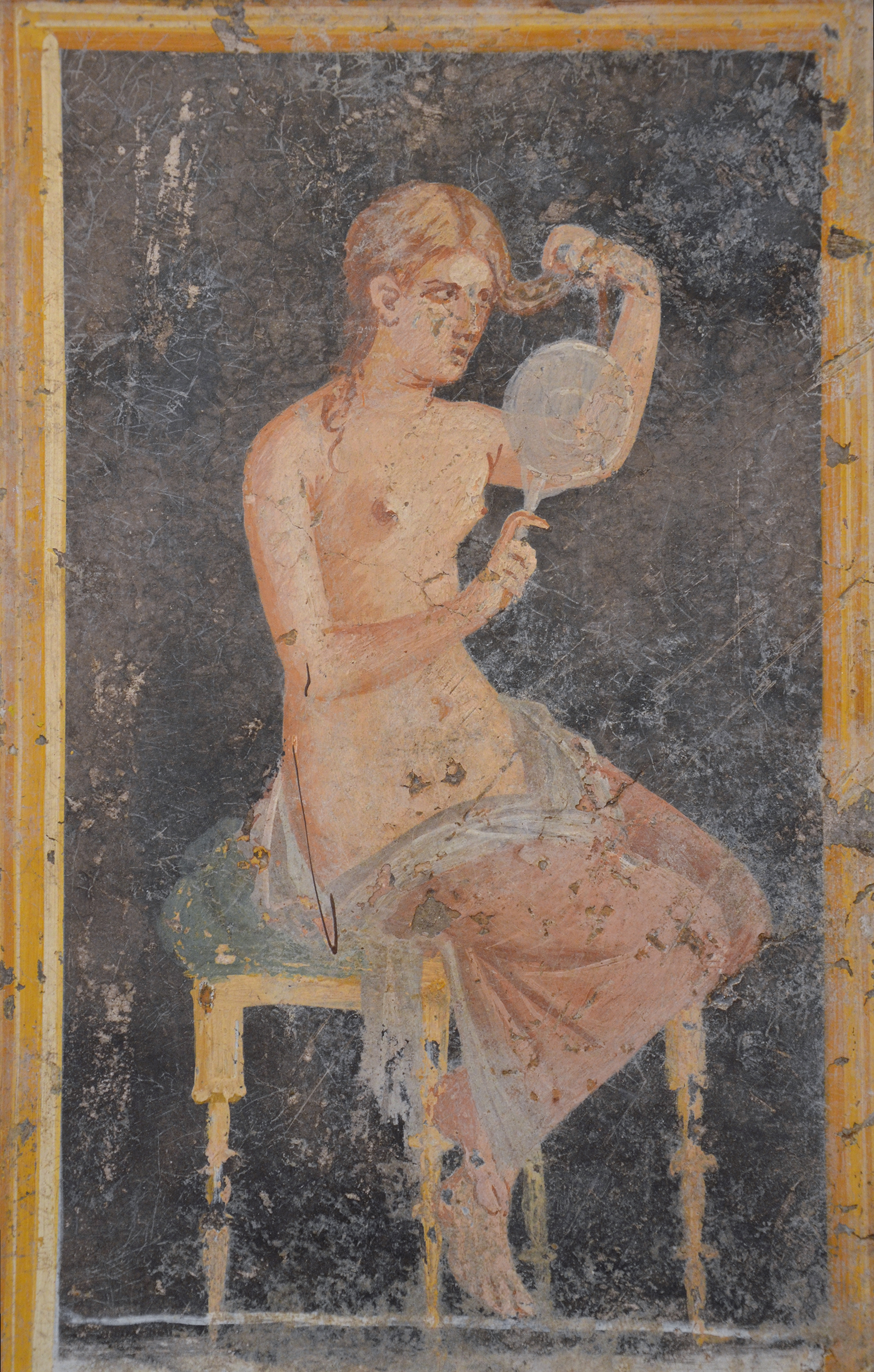
Fresco from Pompeii

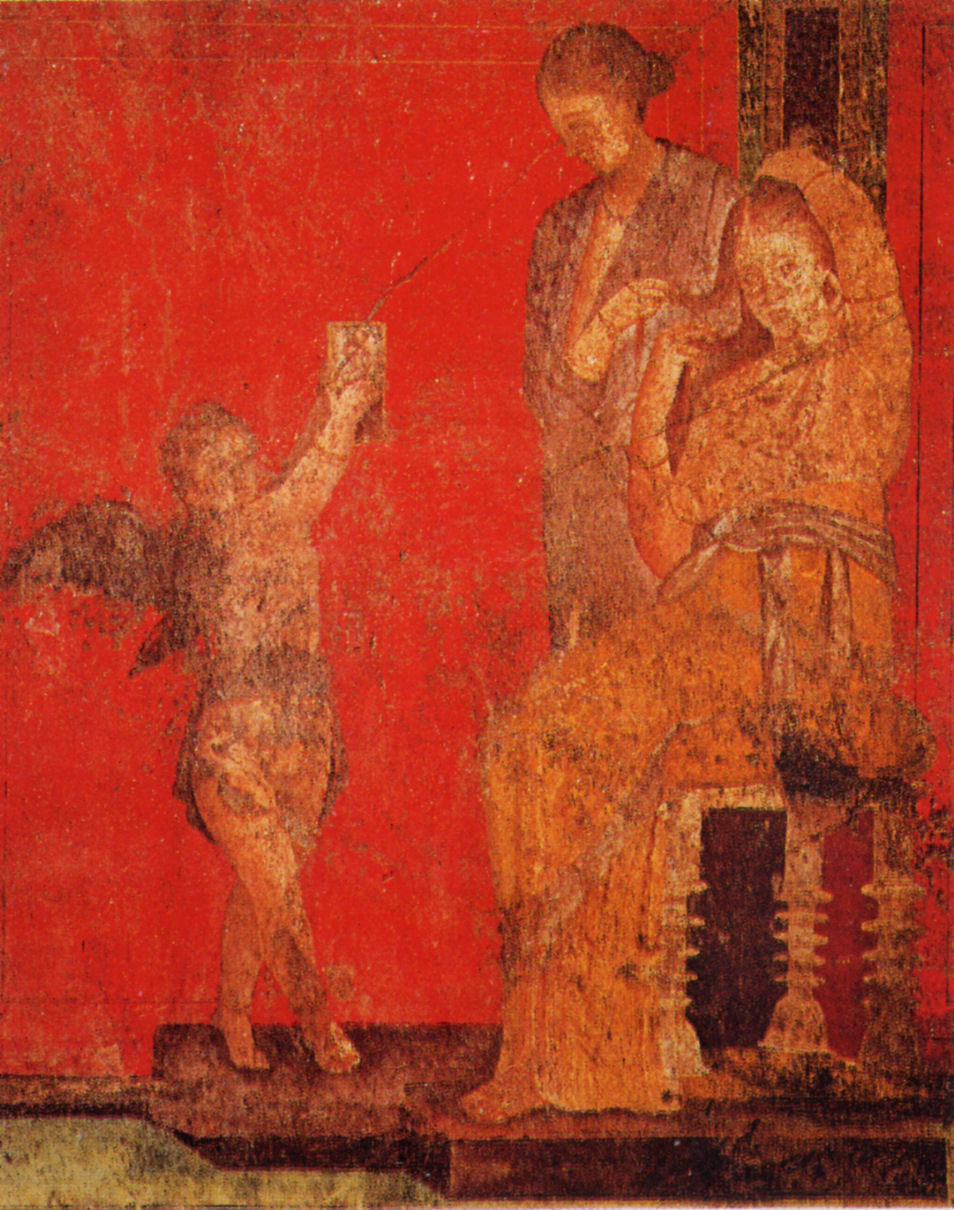
Cupid holding up a rectangular mirror, Villa of the Mysteries

=== India ===
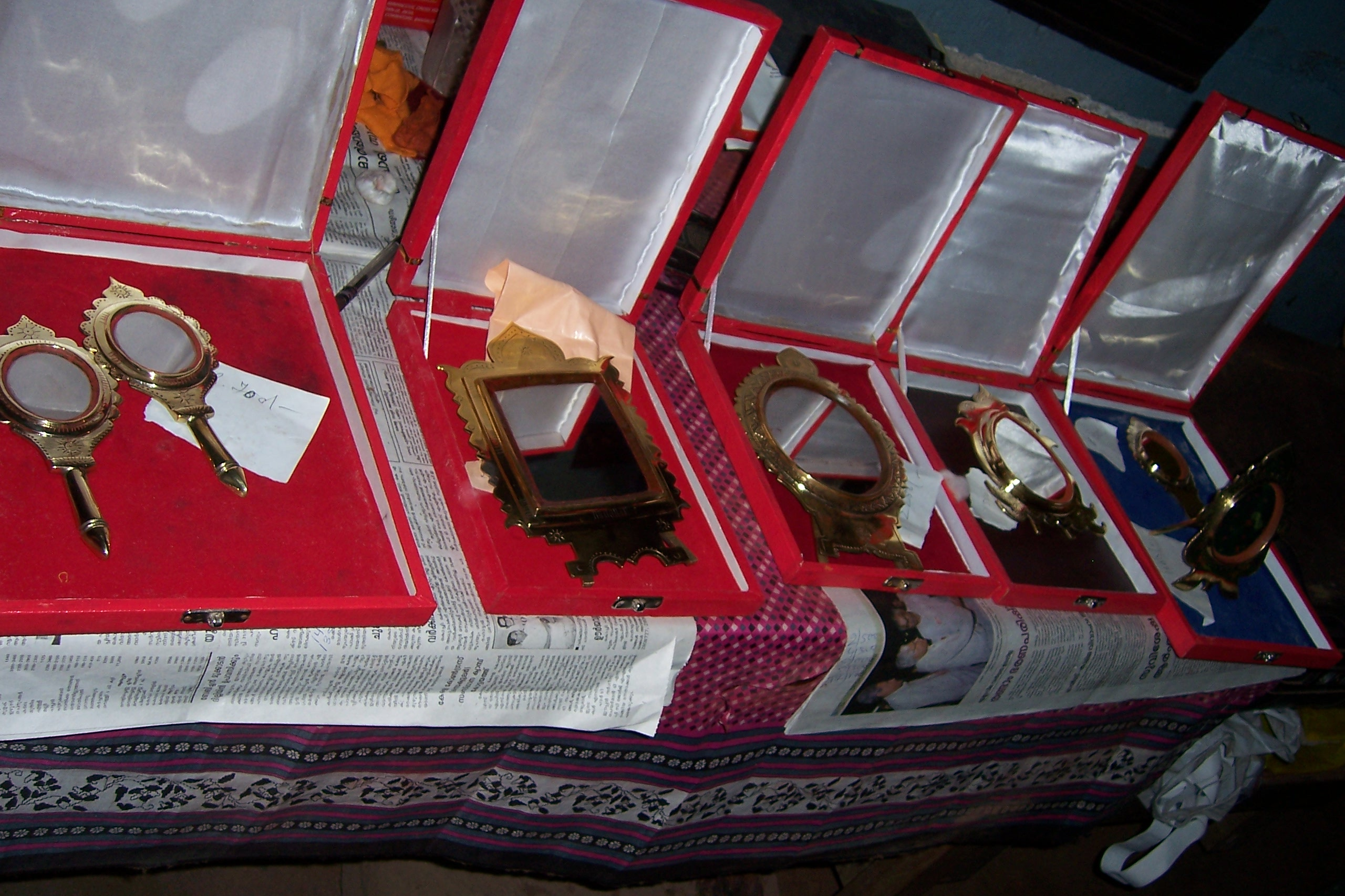
Newly made Aranmula kannadi for sale

In the Indus Valley Civilization, manufacture of bronze mirrors goes back to the time between 2800 and 2500 BCE. Bronze mirrors are usually circular.

With excavations in Adichanallur and Keeladi in Tamil Nadu, India, it is confirmed that communities lived around the Vaigai River valley in the Bronze Age. The excavations done in Adichanallur in 1899 by Alexander Rea, the then Superintendent of the Archeological Survey of India, Southern circle brought out two bronze circular items. They are bronze mirrors similar to ones found in other civilisations. Carbon dating of samples tested resulted in the age of such items to be before 1500 BC.

Aranmula kannadi are still made on a small scale in Kerala, South India, using a type of speculum metal, an extra reflective alloy of copper and tin.

=== Japan ===
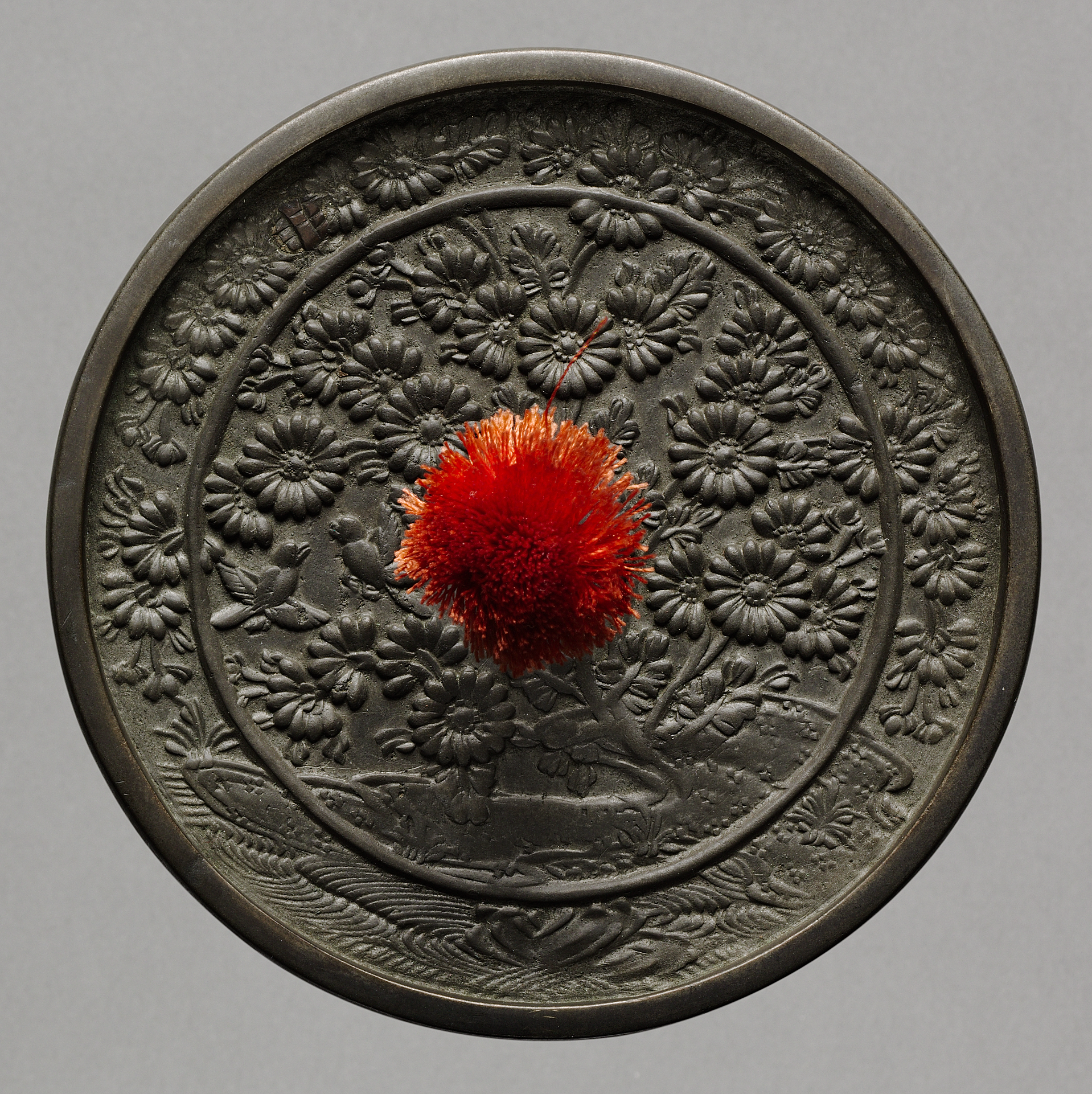
Kamakura Period, with chrysanthemum relief and silk tassel

Japanese bronze mirrors were adopted from China, and are similar in form and, initially, style. Many had red silk tassels through the knob on the back. Mirrors in Shinto have ritual uses. The c. 5th-century Suda Hachiman Shrine Mirror is a National Treasure of Japan, largely for the linguistic importance of its cast characters. According to its relief inscription it was made for a prince. Yata no Kagami (八咫鏡) is a sacred mirror that is part of the Imperial Regalia of Japan.

== See also ==
- Chinese magic mirror
