= Dairoku Harada =

Japanese archaeologist

- 原田 大六
- Harada and his wife, 1956
- Born: January 1, 1917; Itoshima, Fukuoka, Japan
- Died: May 27, 1985 (aged 68)
- Education: Itoshima Middle School
- Military career
- Allegiance: Empire of Japan
- Branch: Imperial Japanese Army
- Unit: Kempeitai
- Conflicts: Second Sino-Japanese War
- Other work: Writer; Archaeologist

Dairoku Harada (原田 大六, Harada Dairoku; January 1, 1917 – May 27, 1985) was a Japanese archaeologist and former soldier of the Imperial Japanese Army who studied in the Fukuoka area.

== Life ==
Dairoku's name comes from the fact that he was born in the 6th year of the Taishō period at Itoshima, Fukuoka (roku means "six" in Japanese). Dairoku learned archaeology when he was a student at Itoshima Middle School in Fukuoka and surveyed archaeological sites within Itoshima Gun. After graduation, Dairoku worked in manufacturing polishing instruments. He was drafted and became a soldier in China. In 1946, he was repatriated, but was purged from public office (he was at first a public school teacher) by Occupation of Japan authorities because he was a member of the Kempeitai or army police. After repatriation, he became an archaeologist, and named himself Hachimusai (one who does not have the eight (hachi) things: land, a house, money, a school career, documents, books, a wife, and a job). Starting in the spring of 1947, he learned archaeology from Heijiro Nakayama, a noted archaeologist living in Fukuoka; this lasted for nine years. Through investigations and excavations, Dairoku came to the conviction that the family of Japanese emperors originated in this area. In early 1950 he first wrote a paper entitled The origin of Japan; studies on the development of kofun culture. In 1965, he discovered the Hirabaru archaeological kofun; he declared that it was the tomb of Amaterasu. In 1966, he wrote another book, Mythology Which Has Really Existed. Later he joined the investigation of Okinoshima, Munakata. He died before the completion of Ito Koku Historical Museum, which houses his work.

== Bibliography ==
=== Books ===
- Japan Kofun culture - Environments of Na country University of Tokyo Press, 1954.(Reprinted San-ichi Shobō, 1975)
- Munakata Taisha Fukuko Kiseikai, Okinoshima Investigation Report 1958.
- Munakata Taisha Fukuko Kiseikai,Another Okinoshima Investigation Report 1961.
- Dispute over Yamataikoku San-ichi Shobō, 1961. (Reprinted by San-ichi Shobō, 1969, ISBN 978-4-380-69200-0)
- Rebellion of Iwai - Ignored Hero Kawade Shobō Shinsha, 1963.
- Mythology which had existed - Excavation of Hirabaru Korun, Gakuseisha,1966.(Reprinted by the same company, 1998, ISBN 978-4-311-20216-2).
- Dispute over Yamataikoku San-ichi Shobō, 1969. (New edition, 1975)
- Excavation of Man-yo-shu by archaeology Asahi Shimbun sha, 1973.
- New Edition of the Rebellion of Iwai San-ichi Shobō, 1973.
- Man-yo-shu, Tensei Marunouchi Shuppan, 1974-1975
- The Origin of the Japanese State San-ichi Shobō, 1975-1976
- The Mirrors of Himiko Rokko Shuppan, 1977.
- Mythology of Raiun San-ichi Shobō, 1978.
- Dotaku eno chosen in 5 volumes Rokko Shuppan, 1980.
- The mysteries of Amida Bukkyouhi -Jodomon and Munakata Shrine Rokko Shuppan, 1984.
- Hirabaru Yayoi Kofun - the grave of Oohirumenomuchi Ashi Shobō, 1991
- Tragedy of Gold Seal Gakusei sha,1992, ISBN 978-4-311-20150-9

=== Papers ===
- Very old tombs of Ishigasaki, Fukuoka Kōkogaku Zasshi, 38, 4, 1952.
- Problems of Kogoishi Kōkogaku Kenkyū, 6, 3, (23), 1959.
- Problems of Yubie - Disappearance of patterns in Mirrors Kōkogaku Kenkyū 6, 4, (24), 1959
- The chronology of Hirakata Swords Kōkogaku zasshi, 47, 2, 1961.
- The arrangement of Raizan Kogoishi Kodaigaku Kenkyū, 28, 1961.
- Reconsideration of half-sharp knives Kodaigaku Kenkyū, 34-35, 1963.
- Archaeology and History, theoretical interpretation of grounds Kōkogaku Kenkyū, 9, 4, (24), 1963.
- Problems of Hirabaru Kofun Kodaigaku Kenkyū 42-43, 1966.
