= Hagi Kōgoishi =

Castle ruins in Asakura, Fukuoka, Japan

- 杷木神籠石
- Asakura, Fukuoka, Japan

Site information
- Type: Korean-style fortress
- Condition: Ruins

Site history
- Built: c.660s
- Built by: Yamato court
- In use: Asuka period
- Hagi Kōgoishi (Fukuoka Prefecture) Hagi Kōgoishi (Japan) National Historic Site of Japan

Hagi Kōgoishi (杷木神籠石) was an ancient castle (also known as a Korean-style fortresses in Japan (朝鮮式山城, Chōsen-shiki yamajiro)) located in the Hakihosaka and Hakihayashida neighborhoods of the city of Asakura, Fukuoka Prefecture Japan. Its ruins have been protected as a National Historic Site since 1972.

== History ==
After the defeat of the combined Baekje and Yamato Japan forces, at the hands of the Silla and Tang China alliance at the Battle of Hakusukinoe in 663, the Yamato court feared an invasion from either or both Tang or Silla. In response, a huge network of shore fortifications was constructed throughout the rest of the 600s, often with the assistance of Baekje engineers, generals and artisans. Unaware of the outbreak of the Silla-Tang War (670–676), the Japanese would continue to build fortifications until 701, even after finding out that Silla was no longer friendly with Tang. The name "kōgoishi" means "stones of divine protection," a name given them by the Meiji period archaeologist Tsuboi Shōgorō, who conjectured that they served as spiritual or practical protection for sacred sites. Scholars after Tsuboi determined that the structures are most likely the remains of practical, military fortifications, and were unlikely to have significant spiritual connections, although much remains unknown about these structures and there is very little contemporary documentary evidence.

The Hagi Kōgoishi is located on the easternmost tip of the Chikugo Plain on the north bank of the Chikugo River. It encloses a hill whose highest point is 192 meters above sea level. In the Kojiki and Nihon Shoki, the Asakura area is said to have been the location of a palace occupied by Empress Saimei. After the fall of Baekje in 660 Baekje loyalists fled to Japan to ask for help in the revival of the kingdom. In May 661, Empress Saimei arrived at the Asakura Palace intending to lead a military expedition to Korea; however, the death of the empress at Asakura thwarted those plans before the army departed. If this account is historically accurate, Asakura was an important location from a transportation and military standpoint, and it is possible that her temporary palace was located within the Hagi Kōgoishi.

The site was discovered during construction work in 1967, and was the ninth kōgoishi to have been identified. The stone wall was built along the ridge line of the mountain, encompassing two valleys, and is oval in shape with a major axis of about 800 meters and a short axis of about 400 meters. The total length of the stone wall is approximately 2250 meters. All of the stones used are andesitic volcanic rocks, which are found widely distributed throughout the area. Although many parts of the earthworks were washed away, it is estimated that they were over four meters deep.There are water gates between the two valleys that open toward the west.

The site is located in front of the Hamasaki housing complex on Japan National Route 386 and is approximately 1.5 kilometers from Chikugo-Ōishi Station on the JR Kyushu Kyūdai Main Line.

== See also ==
- List of Historic Sites of Japan (Fukuoka)
- List of foreign-style castles in Japan
- Kōgoishi

== Literature ==
- De Lange, William (2021). An Encyclopedia of Japanese Castles. Groningen: Toyo Press. pp. 600 pages. ISBN 978-9492722300.
- Motoo, Hinago (1986). Japanese Castles. Tokyo: Kodansha. pp. 200 pages. ISBN 0-87011-766-1.
