= Hiratsuka Kawazoe Site =

Archaeological site in Asakura, Fukuoka Prefecture, Japan

- 平塚川添遺跡 (Japanese)
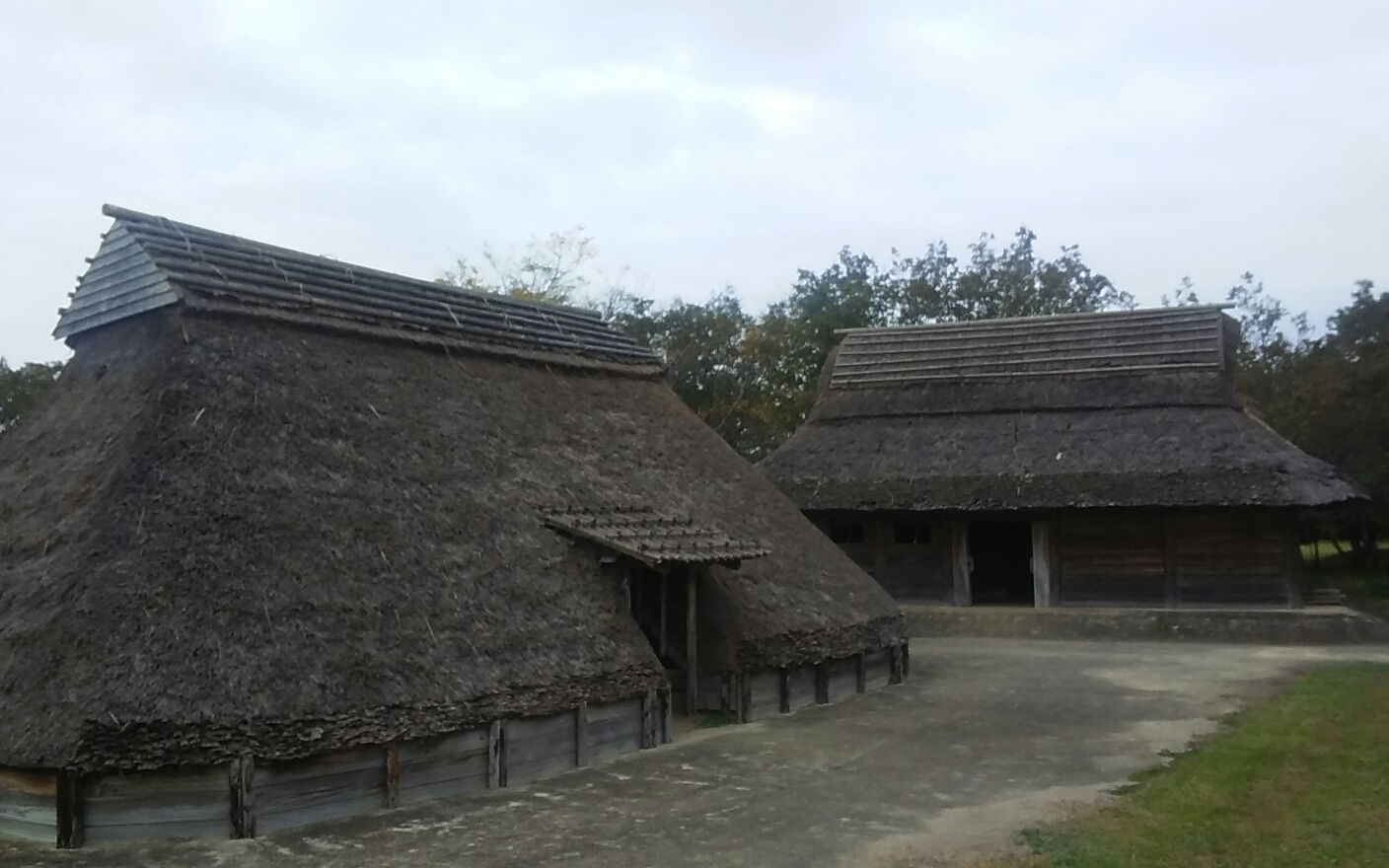
- Hiratsuka Kawazoe Site

- Hiratsuka Kawazoe Site Hiratsuka Kawazoe Site (Japan)
- Interactive map of Hiratsuka Kawazoe Site
- 33°23′40″N 130°39′04″E
- Periods: Yayoi - Kofun period
- Location: Asakura, Fukuoka, Japan
- Region: Kyushu

Site notes
- Public access: No

The Hiratsuka Kawazoe Site (平塚川添遺跡, Hiratsuka Kawazoe iseki) is an archaeological site with the traces of a late Yayoi to early Kofun period settlement, located in the Hiratsuka neighborhood of the city of Asakura, Fukuoka Prefecture in Japan. It was designated a National Historic Site of Japan in 1994.

== Overview ==
The Hiratsuka Kawazoe Site is located in the western part of present-day Asakura City, near the eastern edge of the Chikushi Plain. The Koishihara River, a tributary of the Chikugo River, flows to the west of the ruins, and the ruins are located on a slightly elevated area of about 20 meters above sea level in the Koishihara River basin, on the western edge of the Fukuda Plateau. The Sada River, also a tributary of the Chikugo River, flows to the east of the ruins. The area around this site is an alluvial plain formed, and there are several ruins from the same period in the vicinity, including the Hiratsukayama no Kami ruins in the northeast.

The Hiratsuka Kawazoe Site was discovered in 1990 during the construction of the Hiratsuka Industrial Park. The remains include multiple ring moats, the foundations of about 300 pit dwellings, and the remains of about 100 buildings with buried pillar foundations, all within an area of approximately 17 hectares. The area was occupied for approximately 300 years, from the middle of the Yayoi period to the early Kofun period, and it is estimated that by the late Yayoi period, around the 2nd or 3rd century, it had become a large village surrounded by a water moat. This is thus contemporary with the period of the Civil War of Wa mentioned in the ancient Chinese text Wajinden of the Wei Zhi (ca. 297), which is part of the Records of the Three Kingdoms.

The village contains an oval-shaped central area of about 220 meters north–south by 120 meters east–west (two hectares), surrounded by an inner moat, which contains the foundations of a large buried pillar building. Outside this central area, buildings appear to have been grouped in small clusters surrounded by a double ring moat. Furthermore, on the western lowland opposite the plateau, there are three or four moats, and it is thought that the village had a total area of over 400 meters from north-to-south and 250 meters from east-to-west.

Between the ring moats, there were more than six sections created by bending parts of the moat significantly outward. The area to the southwest of the center, outside the inner moat, is a warehouse area consisting only of buildings with standing pillars. On the north side of this section, there are pairs of postholes on both slopes of the inner moat, which are thought to be piers leading to the center. On the other hand, in the area northeast of the center, outside the third moat, there was a group of pit dwellings in the center, and groups of buildings with standing pillars were discovered to the east and west of these. To the west is a moat-standing pillar building with an oval moat around it, resembling the remains presumed to be the site of a bronze casting workshop at the Suku Okamoto Ruins and Suku Nagata Ruins in Kasuga, Fukuoka. In this area, a large amount of unfinished wooden utensils and planks were unearthed, as well as a large amount of unfinished wooden utensils and planks, as well as wooden utensils. It can be assumed that this is the residential and working area of a group of workers. Furthermore, a piece of a bronze spear mold that was used as an anchor stone was discovered in a pit dwelling on the north side of the center near this area.

In addition to everyday Yayoi pottery, artifacts include metal items such as bronze spears, bronze arrowheads, bronze mirror fragments, beads, and Chinese coins, as well as wooden items such as agricultural tools, building materials, and fishing gear, but no iron items have been unearthed. Plants found include reeds, grapes, alders, yew, Japanese oaks, Quercus serrata, and bayberry.

The site has been developed in the Hiratsuka Kawazoe Archaeological Park (平塚川添遺跡公園) from 2001, with reconstructions of various buildings. It is located one kilometers from Kamiura Station on the Nishitetsu Amagi Line.

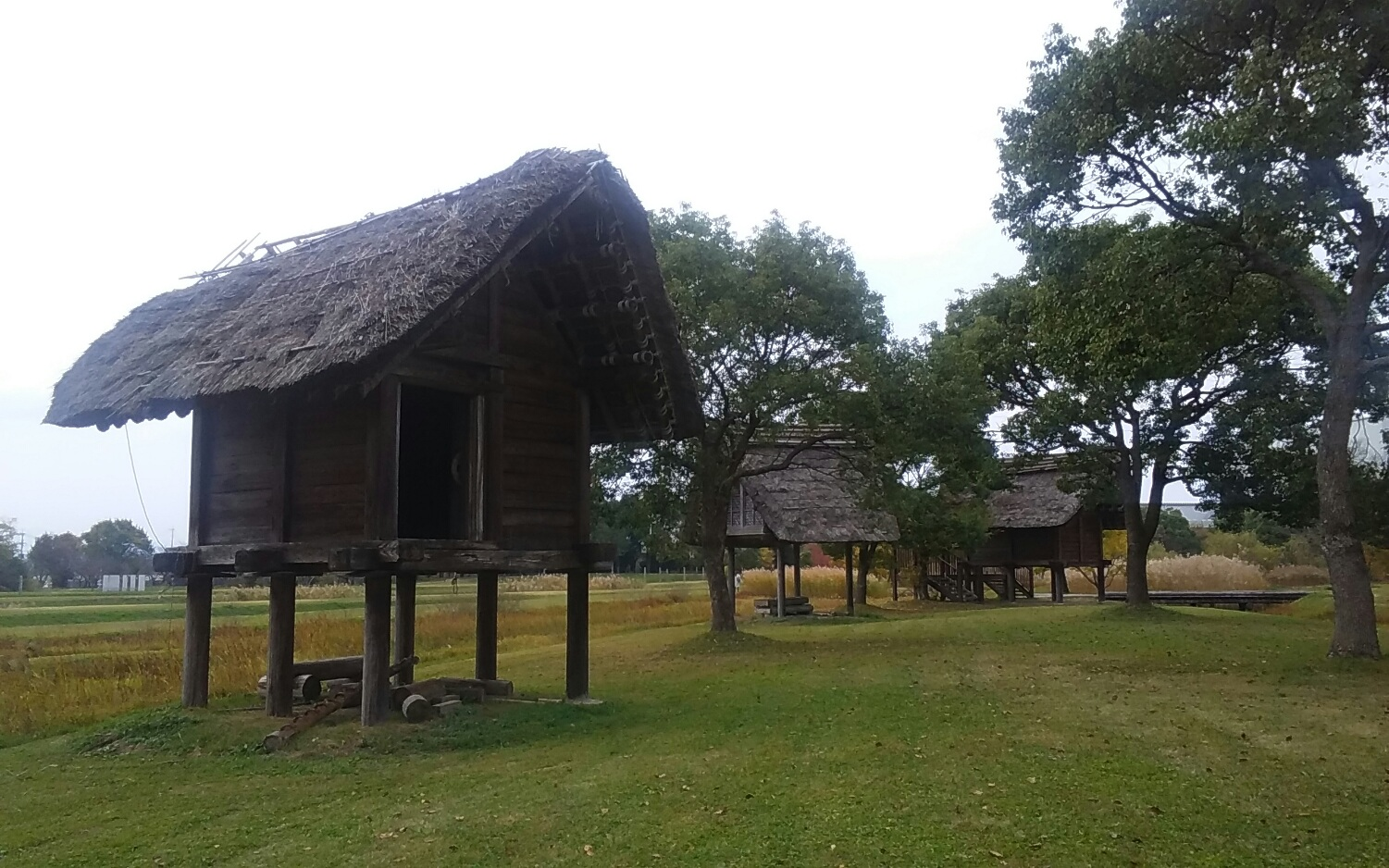
Raised floor warehouse

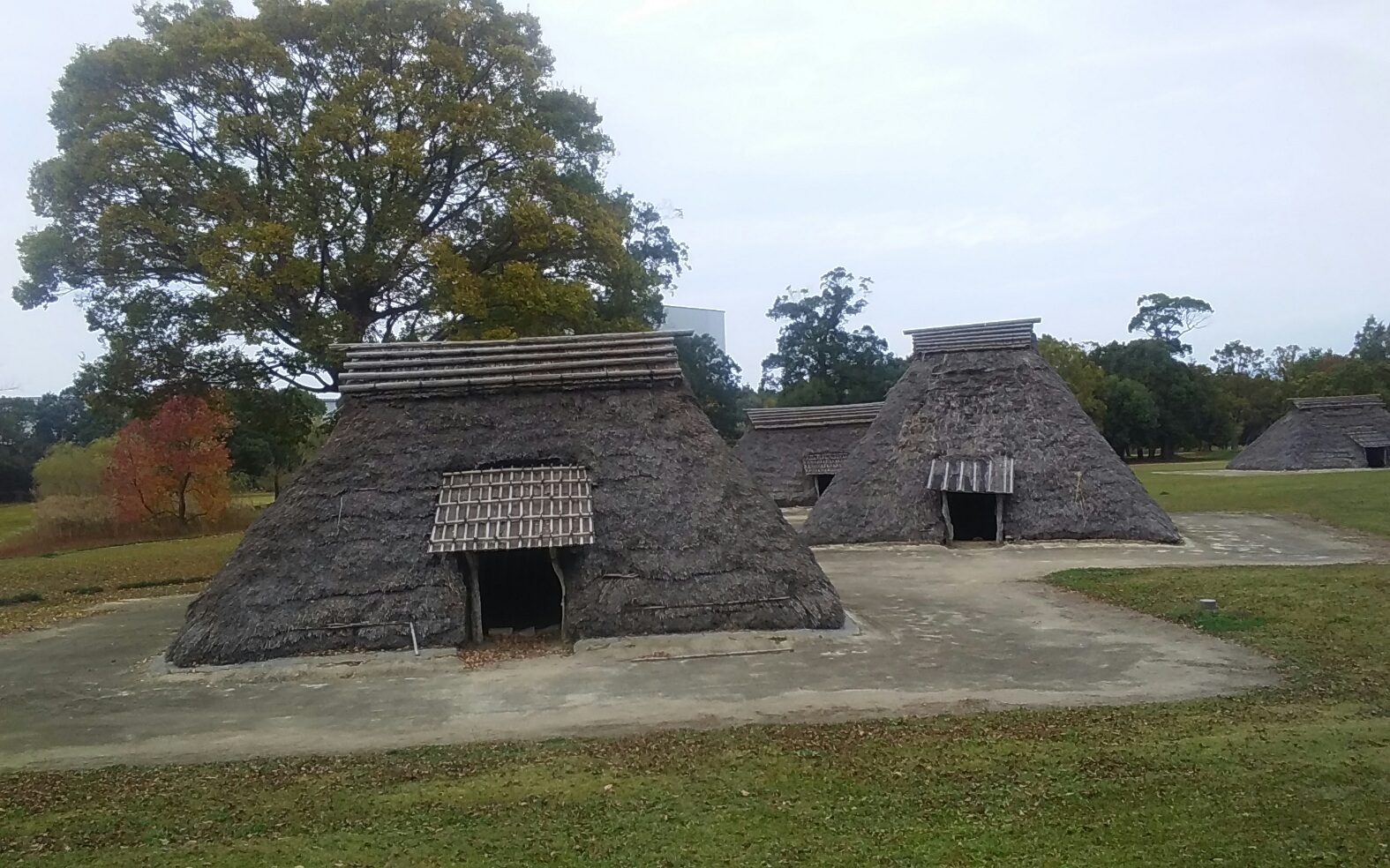
Pit dwelling

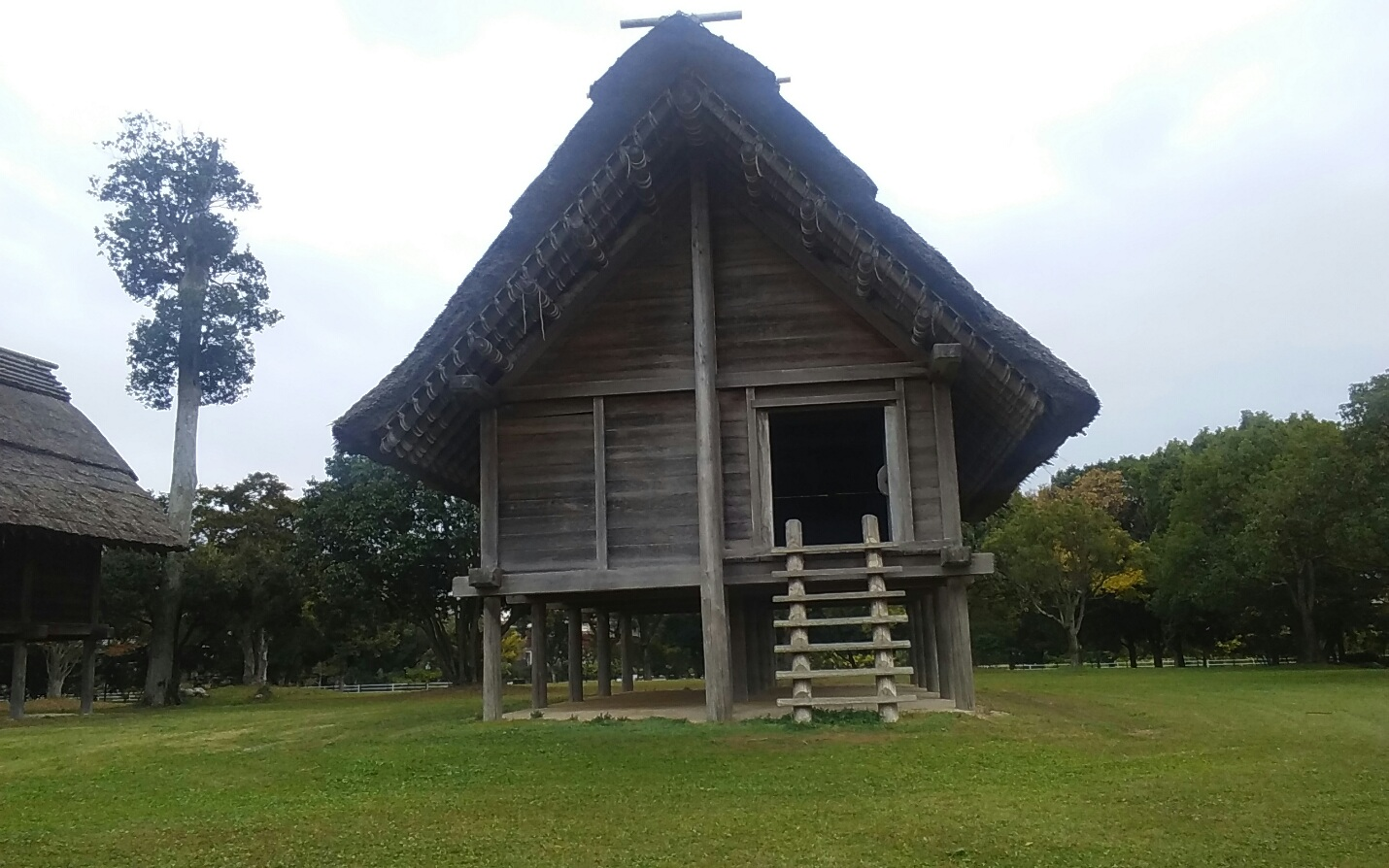
Shrine

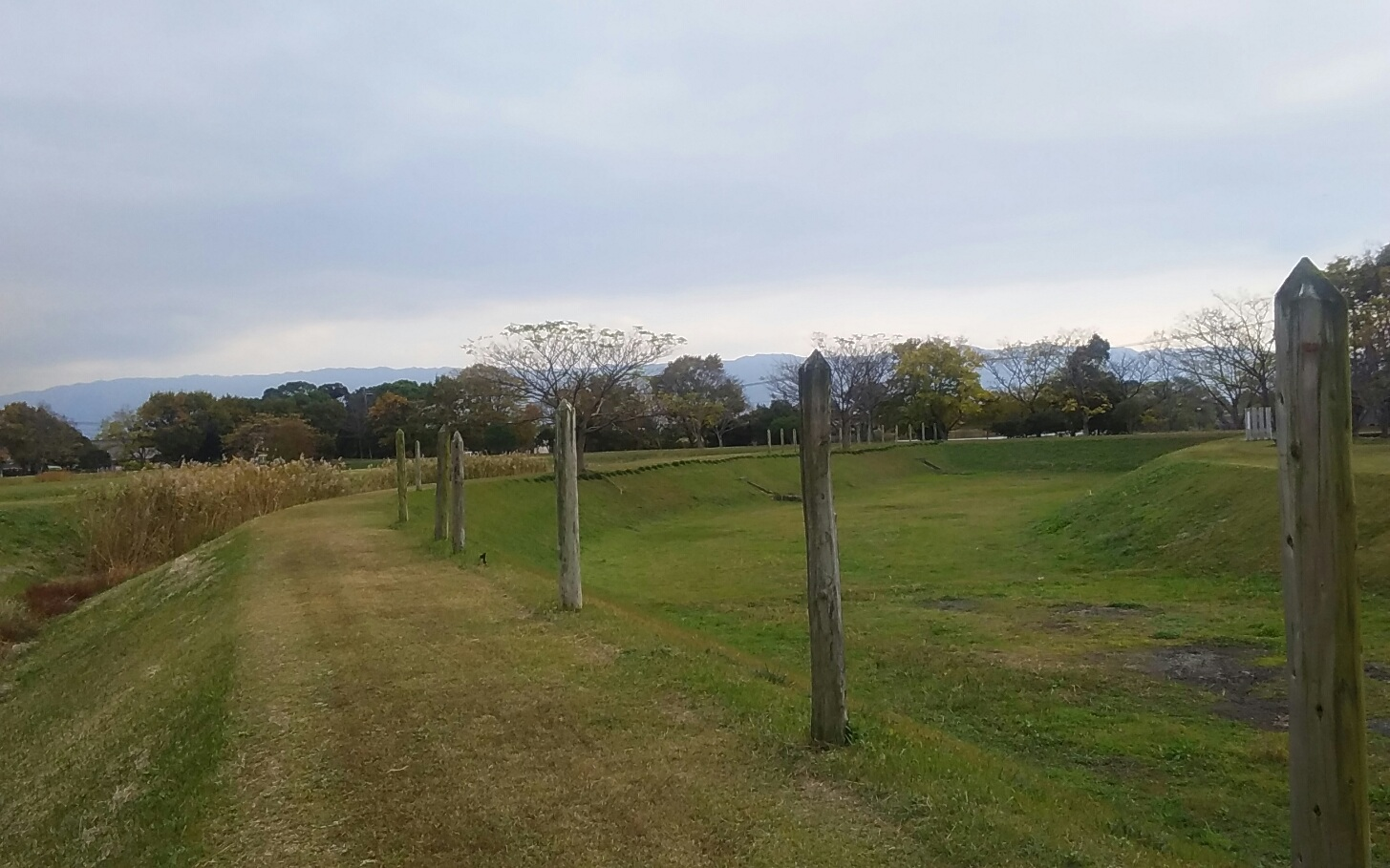
Fence

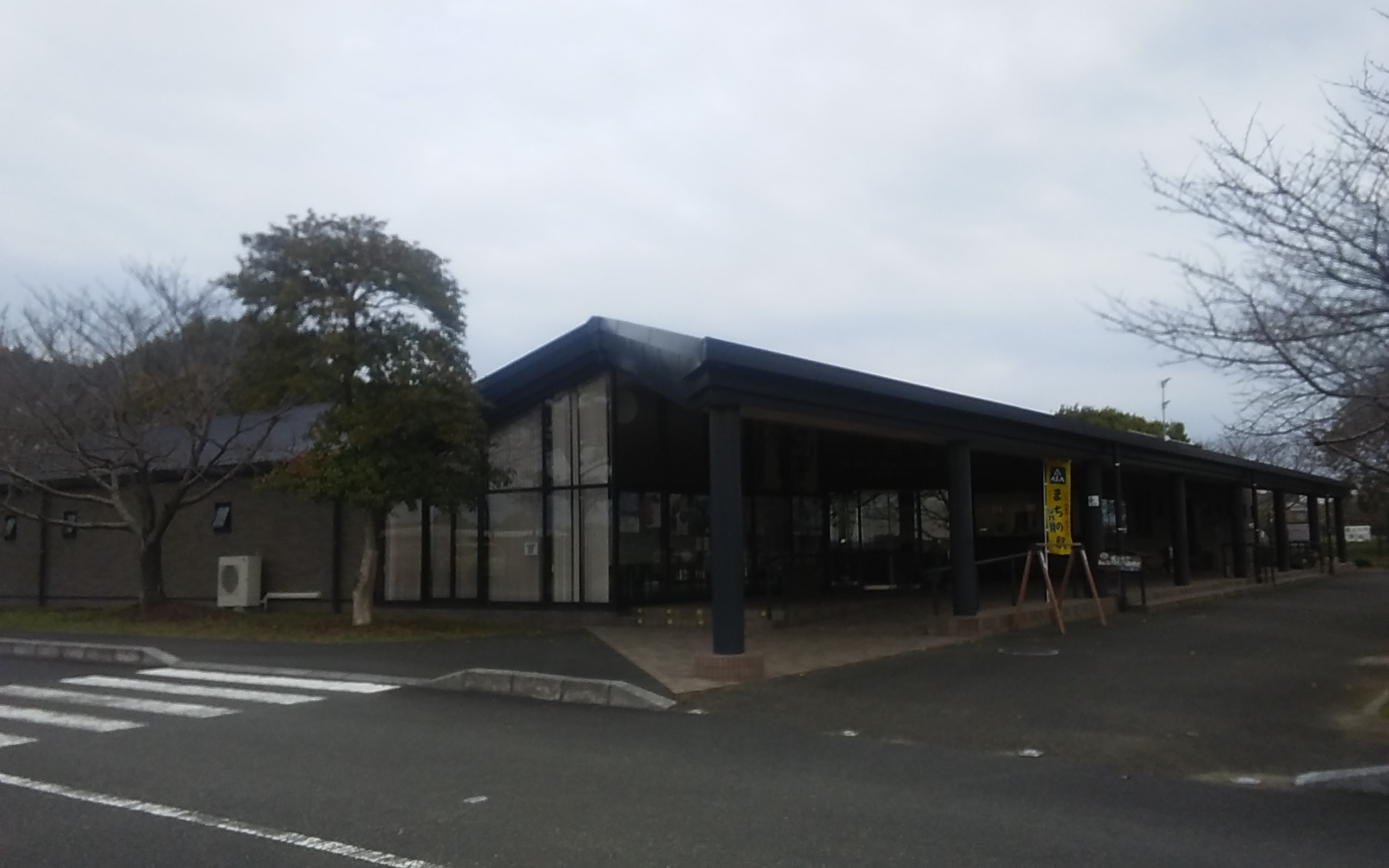
Learning Center

== See also ==
- List of Historic Sites of Japan (Fukuoka)
