= Asakura, Fukuoka =

Asakura 朝倉市
- City
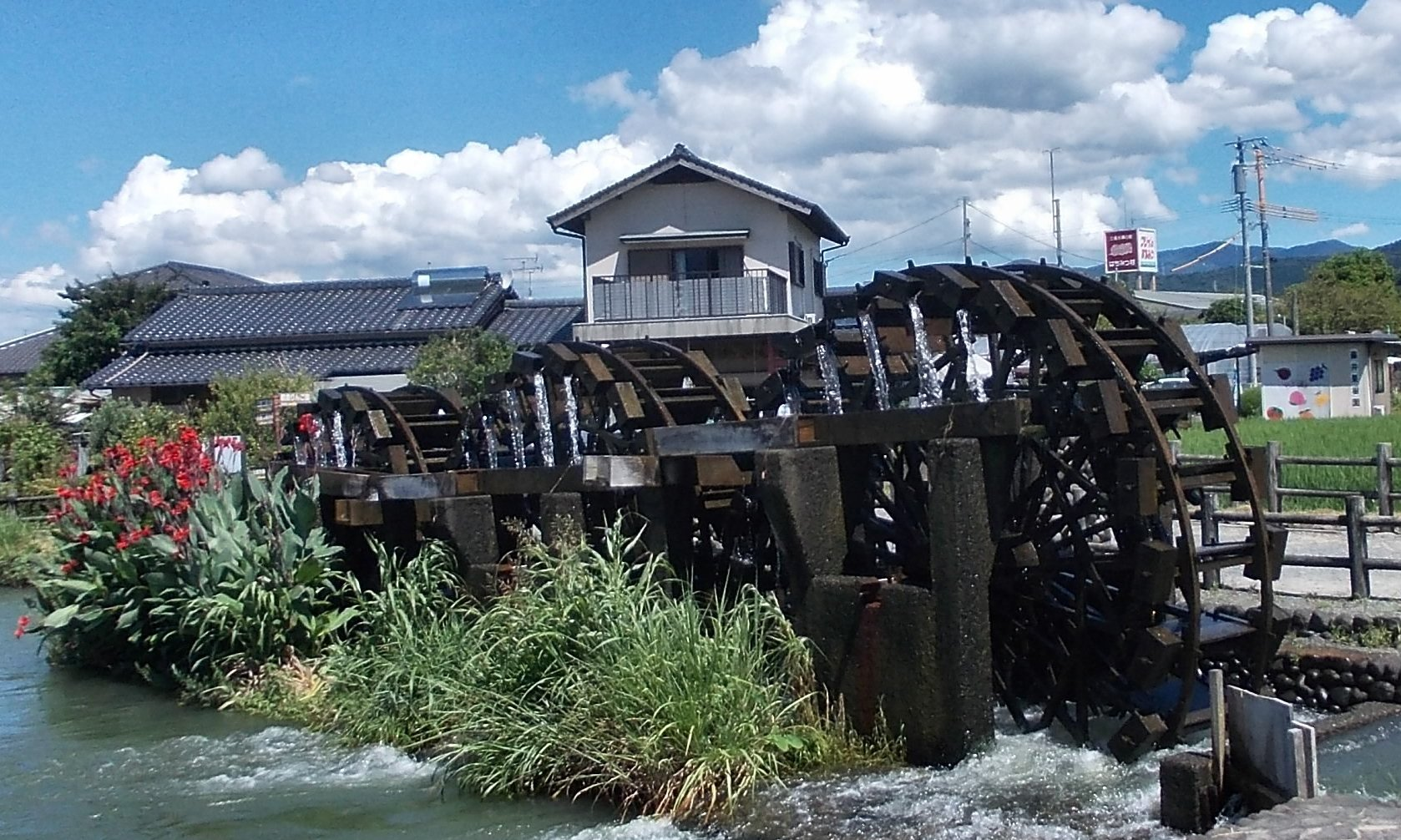
- Asakura Three Waterwheels

- Flag Emblem
- Interactive map of Asakura
- Location in Japan
- Coordinates: 33°25′24″N 130°39′56″E
- Country: Japan
- Region: Kyushu
- Prefecture: Fukuoka
- Amagi town settled: April 1, 1889
- Amagi city settled: April 1, 1954
- Asakura city settled: March 20, 2006

Government
  - Mayor: Hideki Nakashima (中島秀樹) - from April 2026

Area
  - Total: 246.71 km^{2} (95.26 sq mi)

Population (January 31, 2024)
  - Total: 50,488
  - Density: 204.65/km^{2} (530.03/sq mi)
- Time zone: UTC+09:00 (JST)
- City hall address: 412-2 Bodaiji, Asakura-shi, Fukuoka-ken 838-0061
- Climate: Cfa
- Website: Official website
- Symbols
- Flower: Sunflower, Cosmos, Sakura
- Tree: Cinnamomum camphora, Ginkgo biloba, Buxus microphylla

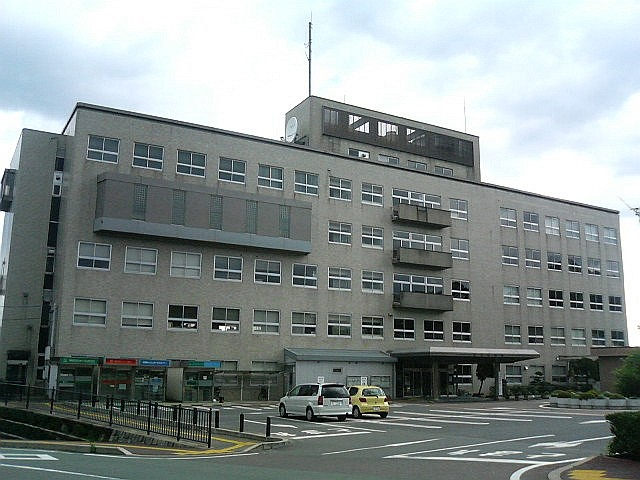
Asakura CIty Hall

Asakura (朝倉市, Asakura-shi; Japanese pronunciation: [ä̀.sä́.kɯ̈́.ɾä́(.ɕì)]) is a city located in south central Fukuoka Prefecture, Japan. As of 31 January 2024, the city had an estimated population of 50,488 in 22168 households, and a population density of 200 persons per km². The total area of the city is 246.71 km^{2} (95.26 sq mi).

== Geography ==
Asakura is located in the central part of Fukuoka Prefecture, about 40 km southeast of Fukuoka and about 20 km northeast of Kurume.

=== Adjoining municipalities ===
Fukuoka Prefecture

- Chikuzen
- Kama
- Kurume
- Tachiarai
- Tōhō
- Ukiha

Ōita Prefecture

- Hita

=== Climate ===
Asakura has a humid subtropical climate (Köppen: Cfa). The average annual temperature in Asakura is 15.9 °C (60.6 °F). The average annual rainfall is 1,953.0 mm (76.89 in) with July as the wettest month. The temperatures are highest on average in August, at around 27.4 °C (81.3 °F), and lowest in January, at around 4.7 °C (40.5 °F). The highest temperature ever recorded in Asakura was 39.2 °C (102.6 °F) on 27 July 2026; the coldest temperature ever recorded was −8.3 °C (17.1 °F) on 25 January 2016.

Climate data for Asakura (1991−2020 normals, extremes 1977−present)
Month	Jan	Feb	Mar	Apr	May	Jun	Jul	Aug	Sep	Oct	Nov	Dec	Year
Record high °C (°F)	19.8 (67.6)	24.7 (76.5)	27.0 (80.6)	31.4 (88.5)	35.1 (95.2)	37.6 (99.7)	39.2 (102.6)	38.4 (101.1)	38.2 (100.8)	33.1 (91.6)	29.7 (85.5)	24.2 (75.6)	39.2 (102.6)
Mean daily maximum °C (°F)	9.8 (49.6)	11.5 (52.7)	15.3 (59.5)	20.9 (69.6)	25.8 (78.4)	28.2 (82.8)	31.8 (89.2)	33.2 (91.8)	29.4 (84.9)	24.2 (75.6)	18.1 (64.6)	12.1 (53.8)	21.7 (71.0)
Daily mean °C (°F)	4.7 (40.5)	6.0 (42.8)	9.4 (48.9)	14.4 (57.9)	19.2 (66.6)	22.9 (73.2)	26.8 (80.2)	27.4 (81.3)	23.6 (74.5)	17.9 (64.2)	12.1 (53.8)	6.7 (44.1)	15.9 (60.7)
Mean daily minimum °C (°F)	0.3 (32.5)	0.9 (33.6)	3.9 (39.0)	8.4 (47.1)	13.4 (56.1)	18.6 (65.5)	23.0 (73.4)	23.3 (73.9)	19.3 (66.7)	12.8 (55.0)	6.9 (44.4)	2.0 (35.6)	11.1 (51.9)
Record low °C (°F)	−8.3 (17.1)	−7.5 (18.5)	−5.6 (21.9)	−1.6 (29.1)	3.2 (37.8)	8.6 (47.5)	14.1 (57.4)	15.1 (59.2)	6.2 (43.2)	0.7 (33.3)	−2.0 (28.4)	−5.7 (21.7)	−8.3 (17.1)
Average precipitation mm (inches)	64.6 (2.54)	81.4 (3.20)	121.8 (4.80)	139.2 (5.48)	169.5 (6.67)	333.6 (13.13)	413.2 (16.27)	206.9 (8.15)	176.6 (6.95)	92.4 (3.64)	88.9 (3.50)	65.0 (2.56)	1,953 (76.89)
Average precipitation days (≥ 1.0 mm)	9.0	9.1	10.9	10.1	9.0	13.3	12.9	10.6	9.5	7.0	8.5	8.6	118.5
Mean monthly sunshine hours	112.5	129.7	162.3	181.5	194.6	122.6	164.1	194.7	159.6	175.3	139.1	118.9	1,854.9
Source: Japan Meteorological Agency

=== Demographics ===
Per Japanese census data, the population of Asakura in 2020 is 50,273 people. Asakura has been conducting censuses since 1920.

Historical population

Year	Pop.	±%
1920	56,148	—
1925	60,124	+7.1%
1930	62,723	+4.3%
1935	61,961	−1.2%
1940	61,683	−0.4%
1945	77,102	+25.0%
1950	76,815	−0.4%
1955	76,687	−0.2%
1960	72,592	−5.3%
1965	68,575	−5.5%
1970	66,623	−2.8%

Year	Pop.	±%
1975	64,982	−2.5%
1980	64,623	−0.6%
1985	65,128	+0.8%
1990	63,724	−2.2%
1995	62,593	−1.8%
2000	61,707	−1.4%
2005	59,385	−3.8%
2010	56,366	−5.1%
2015	52,444	−7.0%
2020	50,273	−4.1%

Asakura population statistics

== History ==
The area of Asakura was part of ancient Chikuzen Province. It is also one of the locations theorized to have been the location of Yamatai, based on the similarity of local place names to those in Yamato Province. According to the Nihon Shoki, after the fall of the Kingdom of Baekje to the combined forces of Tang China and Silla, Empress Saimei relocated the capital of Japan to the Tachibana no Hironiwa Palace in Asakura in 661 AD in preparation for a counter-invasion of the Korean Peninsula; however, she died the same year and the invasion never took place. In 1203, during the Kamakura period, the area was awarded as a shōen landed estate to Harada Tanekatsu, who took the name of "Akitsuki" and who began construction of Akizuki Castle. The Akizuki clan would rule the area for 17 generations to the end of the Sengoku period. Following the establishment of the Tokugawa shogunate, the area became part of the holdings of the Kuroda clan of Fukuoka Domain. Kuroda Nagamasa's third son, Kuroda Nagaoki, was assigned 50,000 koku of the domain's kokudaka and allowed to establish Akizuki Domain as a subsidiary domain. The Kuroda continued to rule to the Meiji restoration. In October 1876, the Akizuki rebellion occurred in which former samurai of the domain attempted to overthrow the Meiji government.

With the establishment of the modern municipalities system on April 1, 1889 the town of Amagi; and 18 villages: Akizuki, Asakura, Haki, Hinashiro, Fukuda, Fukunari, Kamiakizuki, Kanagawa, Takagi, Kugumiya, Mada, Masue, Minagi, Miyano, Ōba, Shiwa, Tateishi and Yasukawa were created. Akizuki was elevated to town status on December 27, 1893.

- June 15, 1909 - Fukunari and Ōba were merged to create Daifuku Village.
- April 17, 1939 - Haki was elevated to town status.
- April 1, 1951 - Kugumiya, Masue and Shiwa were merged into Haki Town.
- April 1, 1954 - Amagi, Akizuki, Fukuda, Hinashiro, Kamiakizuki, Kanagawa, Mada, Minagi, Tateishi and Yasukawa were all merged to create Amagi City.
- March 10, 1955 - Takagi was merged into Amagi City.
- March 31, 1955 - Daifuku and Miyano were merged into Asakura Village.
- April 1, 1962 - Asakura was elevated to town status.
- March 20, 2006 - Amagi, Asakura and Haki were merged to create the city of Asakura.

== Government ==
Asakura has a mayor-council form of government with a directly elected mayor and a unicameral city council of 318 members. Asakura, together with the town of Chikuzen and village of Tōhō contributes two members to the Fukuoka Prefectural Assembly. In terms of national politics, the city is part of the Fukuoka 5th district of the lower house of the Diet of Japan.

== Economy ==
Asakura is a regional commercial center. Bridgestone and Kirin Beer have large factories in Asakura, however, the mainstay of the local economy is agriculture.

== Education ==
Asakura has 11 public elementary schools and six public junior high schools operated by the city government, and three public high schools operated by the Fukuoka Prefectural Board of Education.

=== Prefectural senior high schools ===
- Asakura Kōyō Senior High School
- Asakura Higashi Senior High School
- Asakura Senior High School

=== Municipal junior high schools ===
- Amagi Junior High School
- Akizuki Junior High School
- Haki Junior High School
- Hiramatsu Junior High School
- Jūmonji Junior High School
- Nanryō Junior High School

=== Municipal elementary schools ===
- Amagi Elementary School
- Asakura Higashi Elementary School
- Akizuki Elementary School
- Daifuku Elementary School
- Fukuda Elementary School
- Haki Elementary School
- Hinashiro Elementary School
- Kanagawa Elementary School
- Mada Elementary School
- Minagi Elementary School
- Tateishi Elementary School

== Transportation ==
=== Railway ===
Amagi Railway Amagi Line

- Amagi

Nishi-Nippon Railroad Amagi Line

- Amagi - Mada - Kamiura

=== Highway ===
- Ōita Expressway
- National Route 322
- National Route 386
- National Route 500

== Local attractions ==
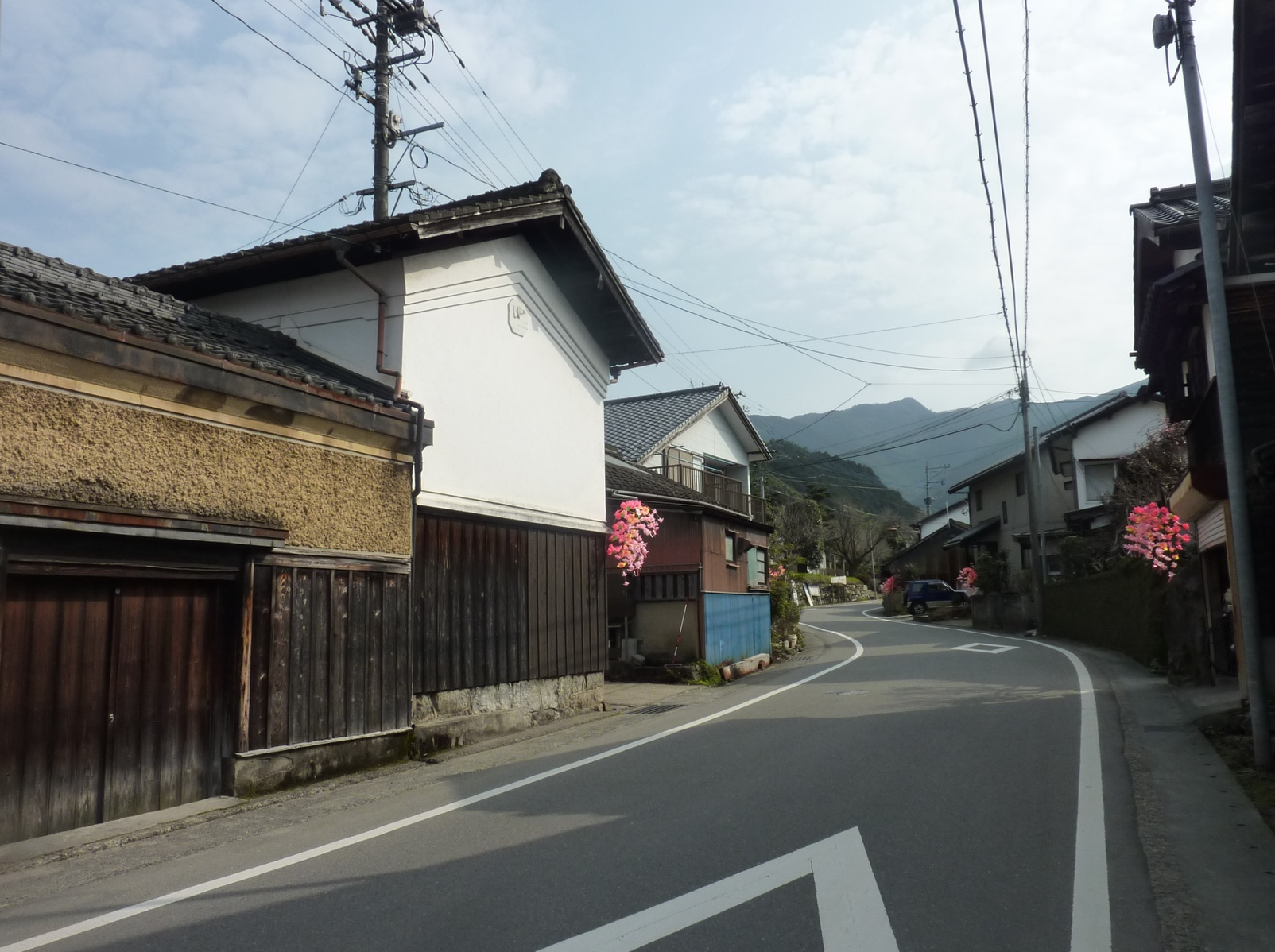
Akizuki Historical Preservation District

- Akizuki Historical Preservation District
- Akizuki Castle Ruins
- Eso Hachiman Shrine
- Hagi Kōgoishi
- Hiratsuka Kawazoe Site
- Horikawa Canal and Asakura Water Wheels
- Oda Chausutsuka Kofun

=== Festivals and events ===
- Dorouchi Festival
- Oshiroi Festival

== Notable people from Asakura ==
- Michiko Kichise, actress and model
- Suu Minazuki, manga artist
