= Hara Saihin =

Japanese poet and scholar (1798–1859)

Hara Saihin (原 采蘋) (1798–October 26, 1859) was a Japanese female kanshi poet and Confucian scholar during the Edo period. She created a masculine persona in both her poetry and life, including sometimes dressing as a man. She never married and wrote of her independent life choices in her poetry.

On her impact, scholar Kikue Kotani called her the "...most outstanding female Chinese poet of the Edo period" and that she was "...idolized by these local poets of the [Bōsō region.]" Scholar Mari Nagase wrote, "Hara Saihin's activities and achievement, as well as those of other eminent elite women of the time, thus paved the way for emerging women writers and educators in the Meiji period."

== Life ==
In 1798, Saihin was born in Akizuki Domain, which was a branch-domain of Fukuoka. Her father was Hara Kosho (1764–1827), a respected but unpublished kanshi poet and Confucian scholar. Saihin and her brothers received an education in the classics of Confucian literature from their father. Her father was invested in her education, writing in a letter to her when she was fifteen years old, "If you achieve excellent skill in calligraphy, you may possibly advance in the world."

Hara Kosho served the lord of Akizuki, but lost his favor in 1812. He also lost his position as a professor at Keikokan, the official school of the domain, and he lost his administrative position. His two sons were unable to secure positions at the domain schools afterward, either due to lack of official appointment or illness. Kosho had an early retirement, and he used this time to travel and visit scholar friends in places such as Hiroshima, Toyoura, and towns near Kyusha.

On the journeys of Kosho, Saihin served as a companion, which enabled her to make acquaintance with various scholars. She also helped her father manage his poetry society and private school, as her brothers were unable to assist due to illness or obligations. In 1823, Kosho and Saihin visited Nagasaki, where they were able to interact with wealthy intellectuals. Kosho decided to spend more time in Nagaski, where his daughter could "experience the world," according to letters to his wife. Saihin became a primary lecturer at a school in Nagasaki, and then she returned home in 1824.

When Saihin was twenty-eight years old, she left for Kyoto to continue her studies. Kosho gave her a poem that included the lines: "I will not allow you to return to your hometown without fame." At the time, returning home "with fame" was expected of sons. On the way to Kyoto, she heard about her father's declining health and returned home. Her father died in 1827.

Following her father's death, Sahin traveled for one and half years, during which she wrote about 100 kanshi poems.

From 1828 to 1848, Saihin lived in Edo and worked as a Confucian scholar, first at the Shonenji Temple in Asakusa. She became well known for her work, and she was listed in at least two books as a respected scholar, including Widely Useful List of Various Contemporary Literati and Artists in Edo (published in 1836 and 1842, in which she was listed in the 1842 edition) and Evaluation of Well-Known Contemporary Edo Literati (published in 1850). She was the only woman in the books to receive the highest evaluation for her work. In Evaluation of Well-Known Contemporary Edo Literati, it was written" Nothing is left to be desired from her scholarship of Confucian studies. Poetry, prose composition, amazing brushwork - all splendid!"

Saihin encountered some criticism as a female scholar. In 1829, after Saihin visited Matsuzaki Kodo (1771-1844), a scholar, he wrote in his journal: I admonished her, 'As a woman, you have traveled alone for thousands of miles, and moreover, you have stayed with various people. Even if you have kept your chastiity, you cannot avoid other people's suspicious talk. You had better get married, breaking off your broad associations...' She seemed not yet to be convinced. I ordered some sake, but she left after a few cups."

Saihin composed poems in which she had a masculine persona and displayed little interest in pursuing marriage. In one poem from 1827 she wrote, "It is trivial, but I keep my heart to myself. /On and on, I repeatedly explore the corners of this world." In another poem from 1827, she wrote: "People say I am to go far away to find a smart man like Baluan. / I wonder when I might pick a spray of the lwtsura tree in the moonlight." The katsura tree represented success. Similarly, some contemporary poets of her time praised her poems as having "strength" and "vigor," like those of male poets.
