= Oda Chausutsuka Kofun =

Kofun period burial mound in Asakura, Japan

- 小田茶臼塚古墳 (Japanese)
- Oda Chausutsuka Kofun Oda Chausutsuka Kofun (Japan)
- Interactive map of Oda Chausutsuka Kofun
- 33°23′18″N 130°39′53″E
- Type: Kofun
- Periods: Kofun period
- Location: Asakura, Fukuoka, Japan
- Region: Kyushu

History
- Built: c.5th century

Site notes
- Public access: Yes (no facilities)

The Oda Chausutsuka Kofun (小田茶臼塚古墳) is a Kofun period burial mound, located in the Oda neighborhood of former Amagi city in what is now part of the city of Asakura, Fukuoka Prefecture Japan. The tumulus was designated a National Historic Site of Japan in 1979. It is believed to have been built in the late 5th century.

== Overview ==
The Oda Chausutsuka Kofun is located on the eastern edge of the Chikugo Plain, on the right bank of the Sada River, a tributary of the Chikugo River. Its existence has been known for a long time, and it is listed in a local history texts on Chikuzen Province in 1798 and 1863. The total length of the tumulus is 54.5 meters, and it is a zenpō-kōen-fun (前方後円墳), which is shaped like a keyhole, having one square end and one circular end, when viewed from above. The diameter of the posterior circular portion is 39.7 meters, and the width of the rectangular anterior portion is 25 meters, narrowing to 14.5 meter at the construction between the two portions. The length of this anterior portion is only 14.5 meters, which is short for a typical tumulus of this style. The height of the tumulus os 5 meters. The tumulus is orientated to the north, but the opening for the horizontal passage-style stone burial chamber is to the southwest. This chamber measures 3.5 meters long by 2.2 meters wide and 1.6 meters high. The tumulus was surrounded by a moat 4 meters wide and 0.6 meters deep.

The posterior circular part was constructed in three stages, with the bottom stage being carved out of the ground, and the second and higher stages being mounds with fukiishi. The anterior part was built in two stages, and in the second stage a row of cylindrical and "morning-glory shaped" haniwa was detected. Additionally, a large Sue ware jar and a utensil stand were placed above the constriction.

During the construction of a road in 1928, the southeastern portion of the posterior circular part was destroyed and the burial chamber exposed. A local teacher from Asakura Junior High School (currently Asakura High School) conducted a survey, and many of the excavated grave goods are still stored at the school. A formal archaeological excavation was not conducted until 1973. The grave goods recovered in 1928 included a short armor with horizontal strips, a helmet, a pauldron, an iron sword, two iron spears, five iron bars, a bundle of iron arrowheads, eight cyliindrical beads, 226 round glass beads, and 161 small beads. Also found were horse harnesses, a four-ringed bell, stone pestle and ancient Sue ware pottery.

Approximately three kilometers north of the tumulus is the Amagi Historical Museum, which displays excavated items. The tumulus itself is approximately eight minutes by car from Amagi Station on the Amagi Railway Amagi Line.

== See also ==
- List of Historic Sites of Japan (Fukuoka)
