= Horikawa Canal =

Canal in Fukuoka Prefecture, Japan

- 堀川用水 (Japanese)
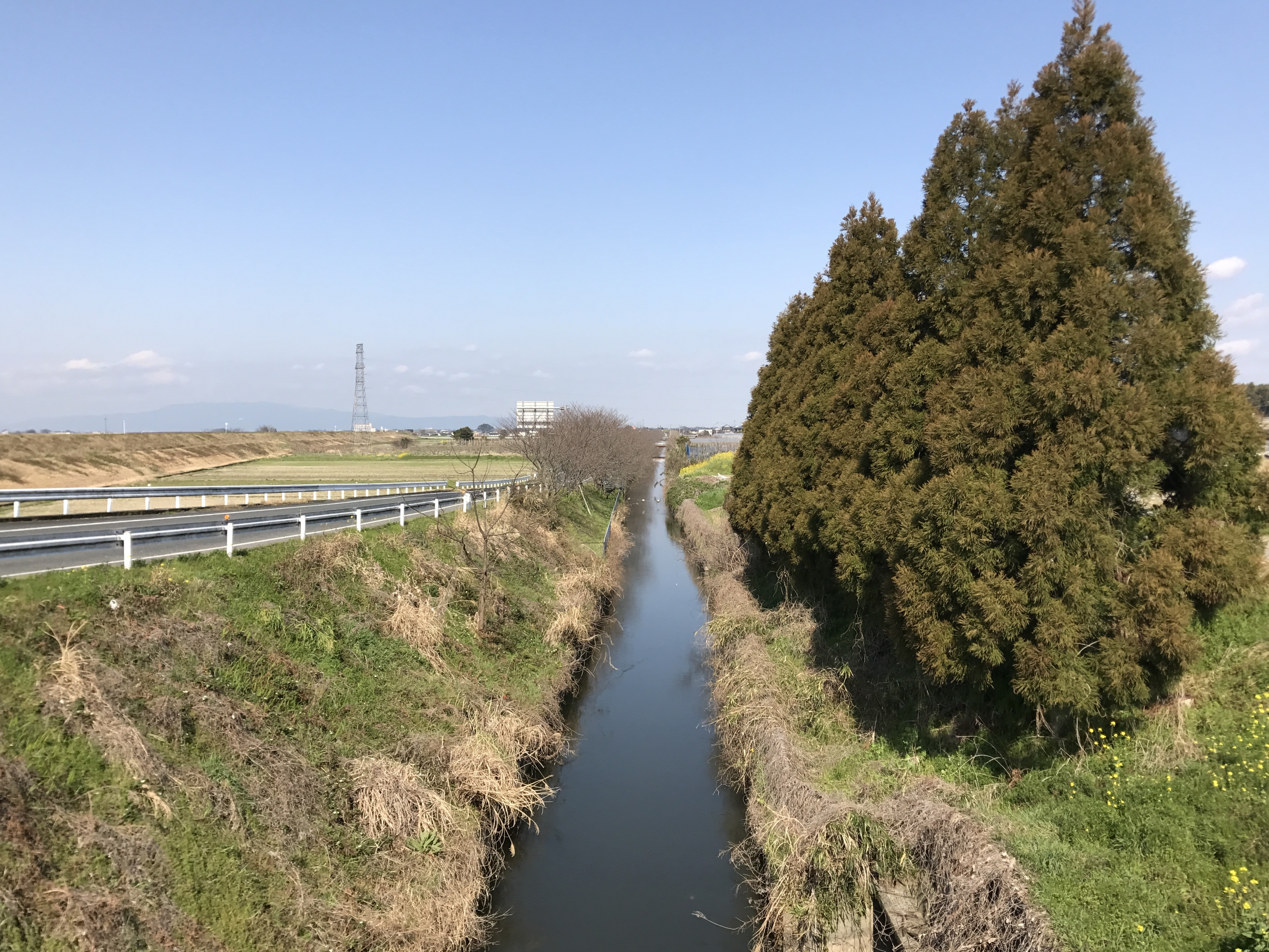
- Horikawa Aqueduct from Kakureganomoribashi Bridge
- Interactive map of Horikawa Canal
- 33°22′06″N 130°44′55″E
- Periods: Edo period
- Location: Asakura, Fukuoka, Japan
- Region: Kyushu

Site notes
- Public access: Yes

The Horikawa Canal (堀川用水, Horijkawa Yosui) is an Edo period agricultural irrigation canal, located on the Chikugo River in the city of Asakura, Fukuoka Prefecture Japan. Together with the Asakura Waterwheel pumping system, it was designated a National Historic Site of Japan in 1979. It irrigates a total of 664 hectares of paddy fields..

== Horikawa Canal ==
Construction of the Horikawa Canal began in 1663 in the early Edo period by Fukuoka Domain and it was completed the following year. The main canal has a length of 11 kilometers, and branch canals extend for another 77 kilometers. The current water intake is the Yamada Weir. The canal has a branch point in the middle of the main line. The northern half of the main line was the original Horikawa Canal, and the southern half was completed in 1764, and was referred to as the "New Horikawa Canal".

Under the Tokugawa shogunate, each feudal domain began implementing policies to promote new rice field development in order to improve their financial situation. In the early Edo period, the Asakura area suffered from frequent drought and locust damage alternative with flooding of the Chikugo River, but with the construction of the Horikawa Canal, this area became a grain-producing area and source of revenue for the Fukuoka Domain.

However, due to the accumulation of earth and sand at the intake, the intake was moved in 1722. A tunnel with a length of 11 meters was cut out with a chisel into the bedrock on the right bank of the Chikugo River next to the current Yamada Weir, and was called Kirinuki Suimon. In 1759, the amount of water from the Horikawa Canal became insufficient due to the excessive expansion of new rice fields, and water was not longer available to the rice fields downstream. It was decided that the width of the irrigation canal should be widened and the main canal extended. Construction work was finally completed in 1764.

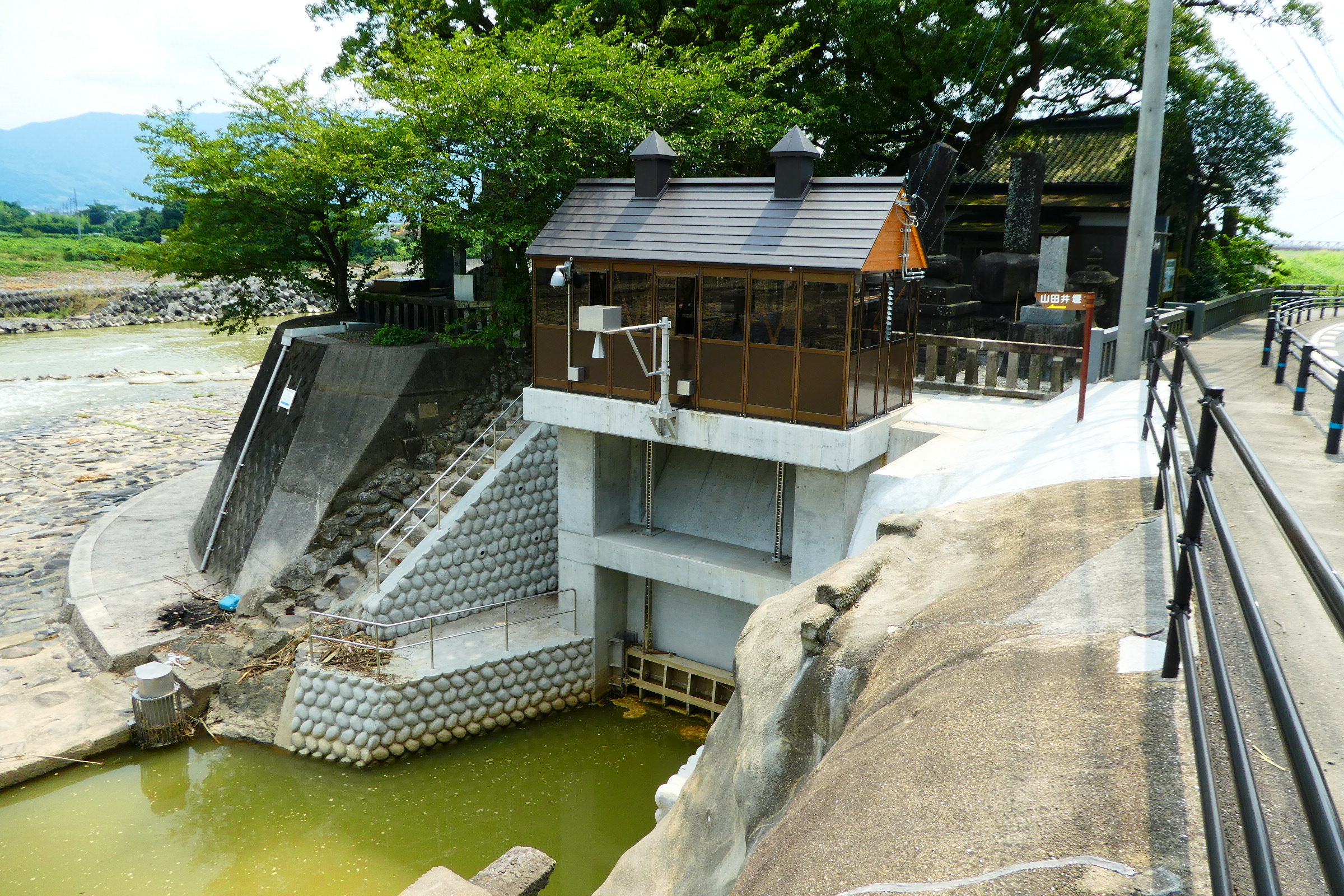
Kirinuki Suimon.jpg

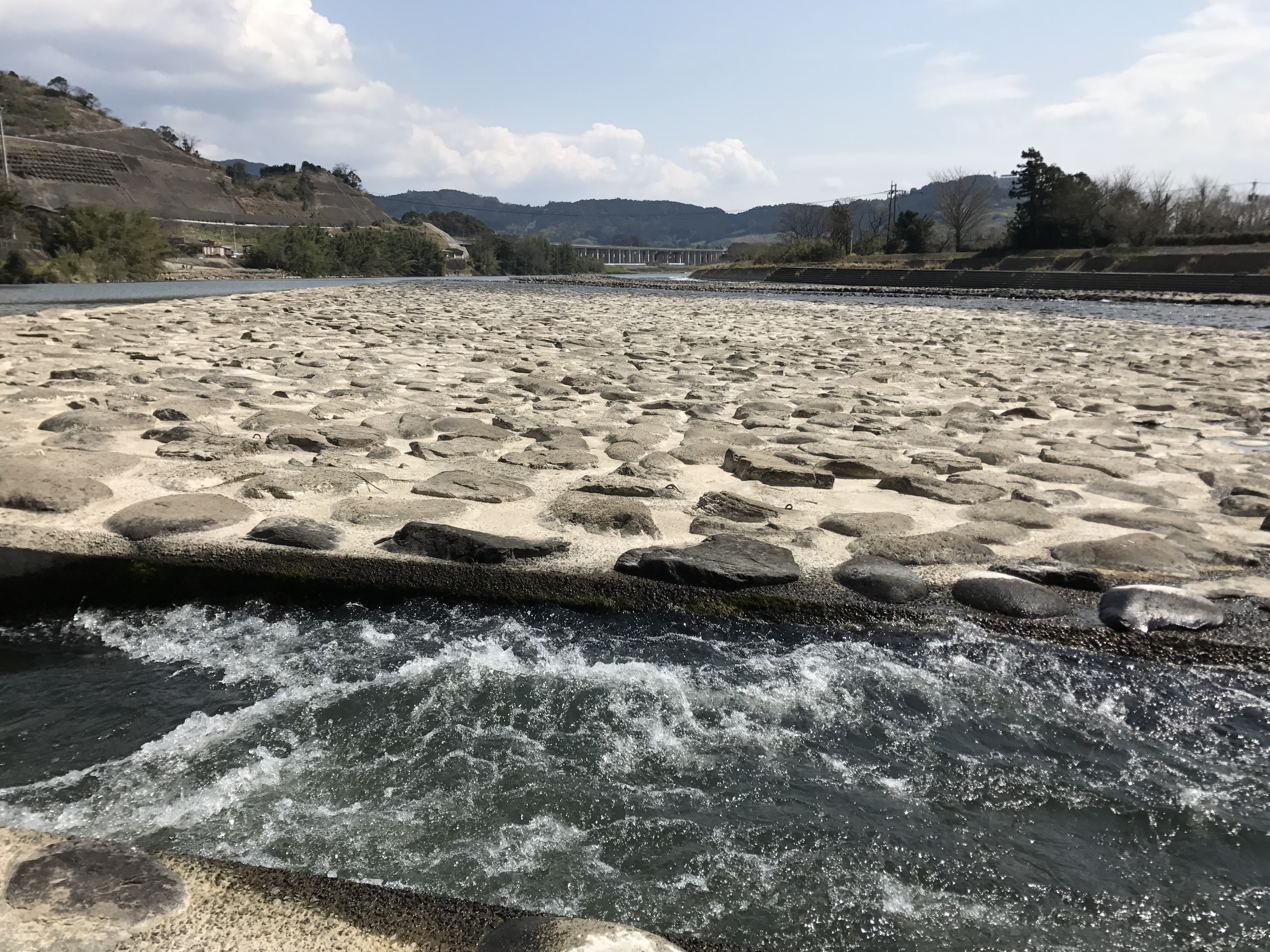
Yamada Weir on Chikugo River

== Asakura Waterwheels ==
The Asakura water wheels have been in operation for over 200 years, and are the oldest operating water wheels in Japan. After the Horikawa Canal was completed in 1663 in response to a famine caused by drought, a water gate was cut out of the bedrock in 1790 and the Yamada Weir was constructed to dam the water to expand the irrigated area. However, since the land near the upper reaches of the Horikawa Canal is at a slightly higher elevation, it was not possible to use the water from the Horikawa Canal directly, so a series of self-rotating water wheels were constructed. A rapid stream from the outlet of the weir powers the water wheels, which are equipped with buckets to pump up the water to higher elevations.

The pumping systems were constructed in four locations and are known to be in operating from 1759, and three of the systems (the Hishino Suisha, Mishima Suisha, and Hisashige Suisha, named after the hamlets where they are located), remain in use. Of these, the Hishino Suisa, which was completed in 1789, is a triple wheel system, and the other two are double wheel systems. The Hishino Suisha can pump 6100 liters of water per minute. The water is then sent to a higher location by a siphon buried underground. The irrigated area is approximately 35 hectares in total, and the operating period is from June 17 to mid-October every year, which overlaps with the rice planting period The waterwheels are rebuilt every five years by local craftsmen, and the original techniques have been passed down.

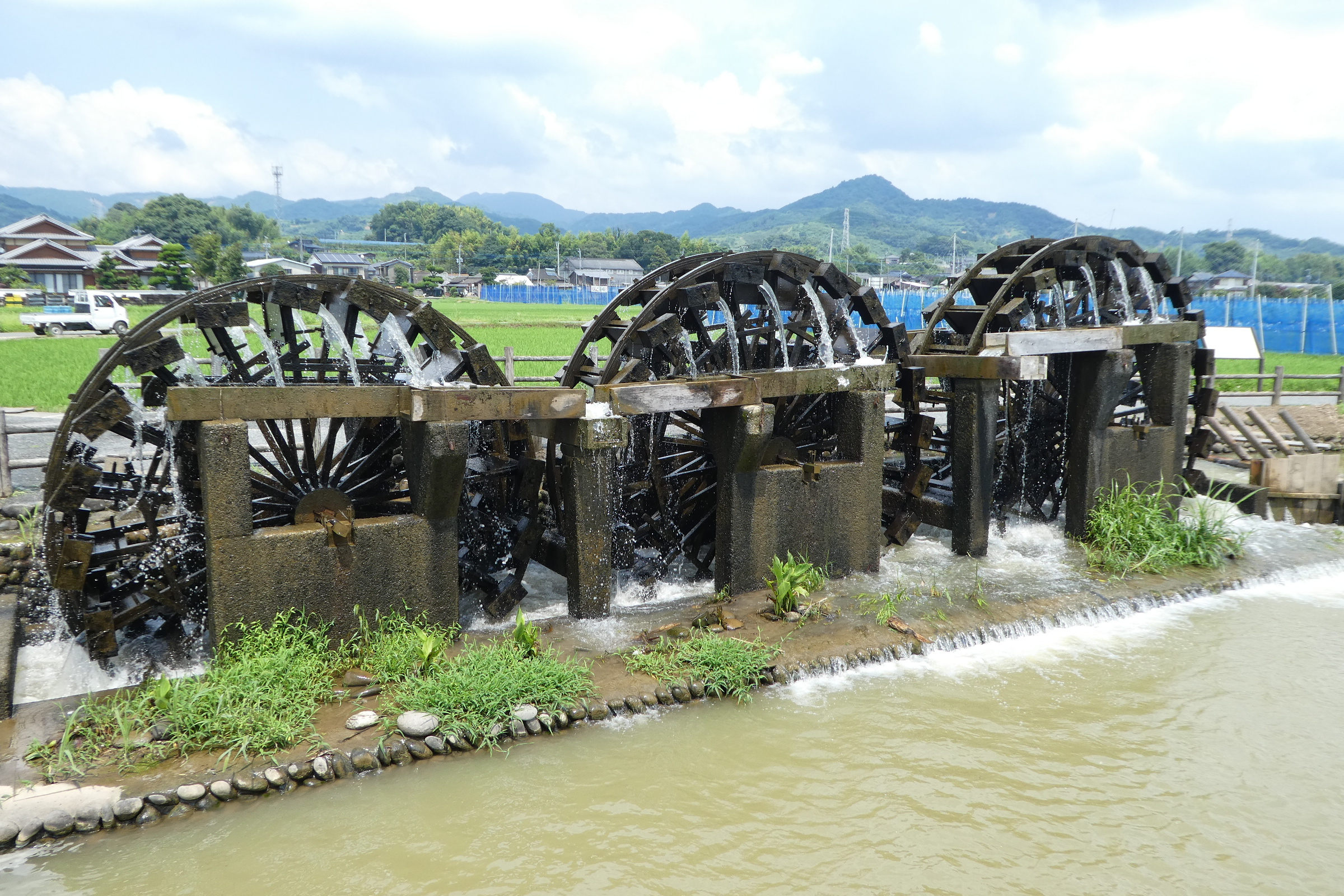
Hishino Suisha

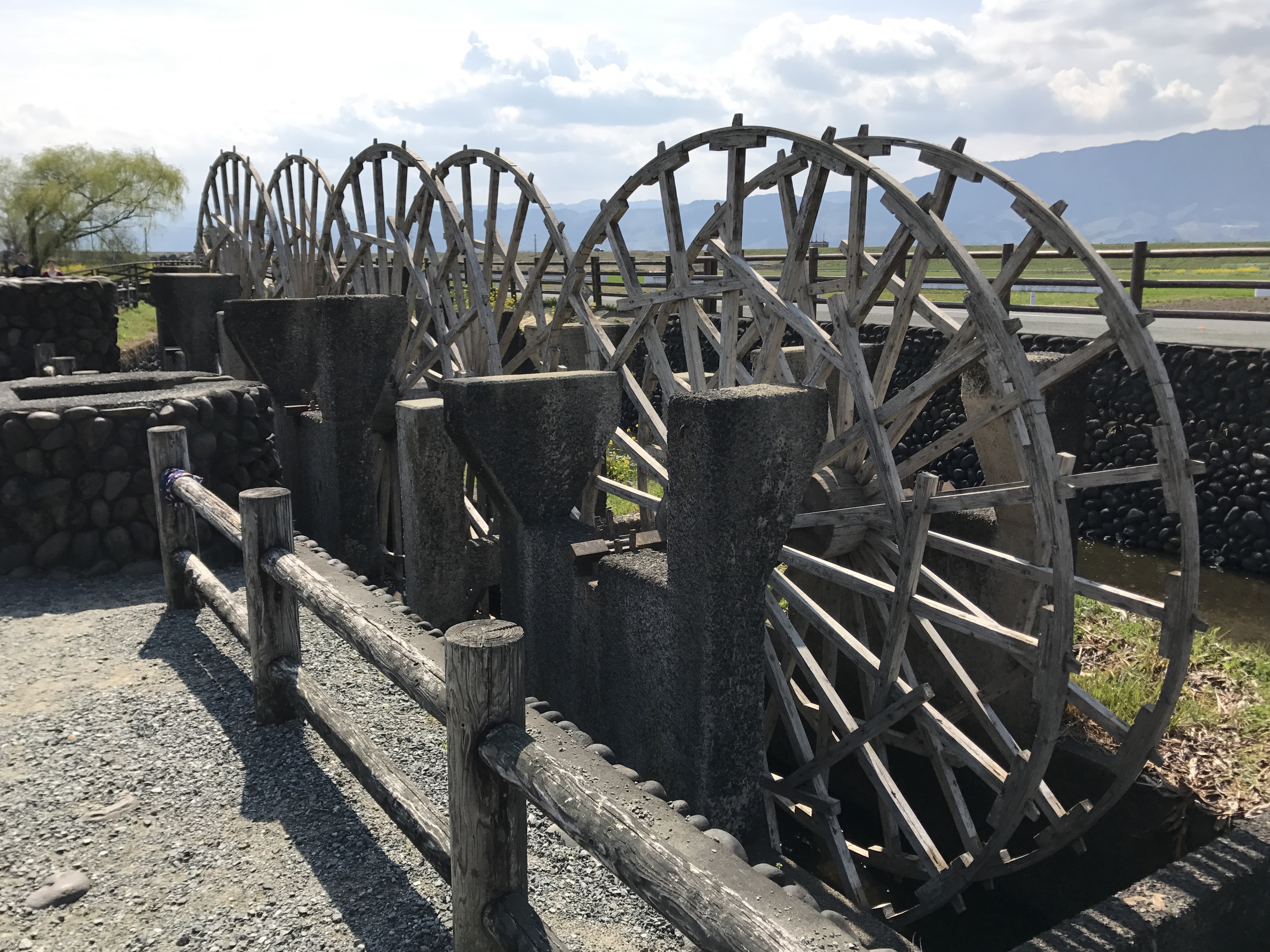
Hishino Suisha under renovation

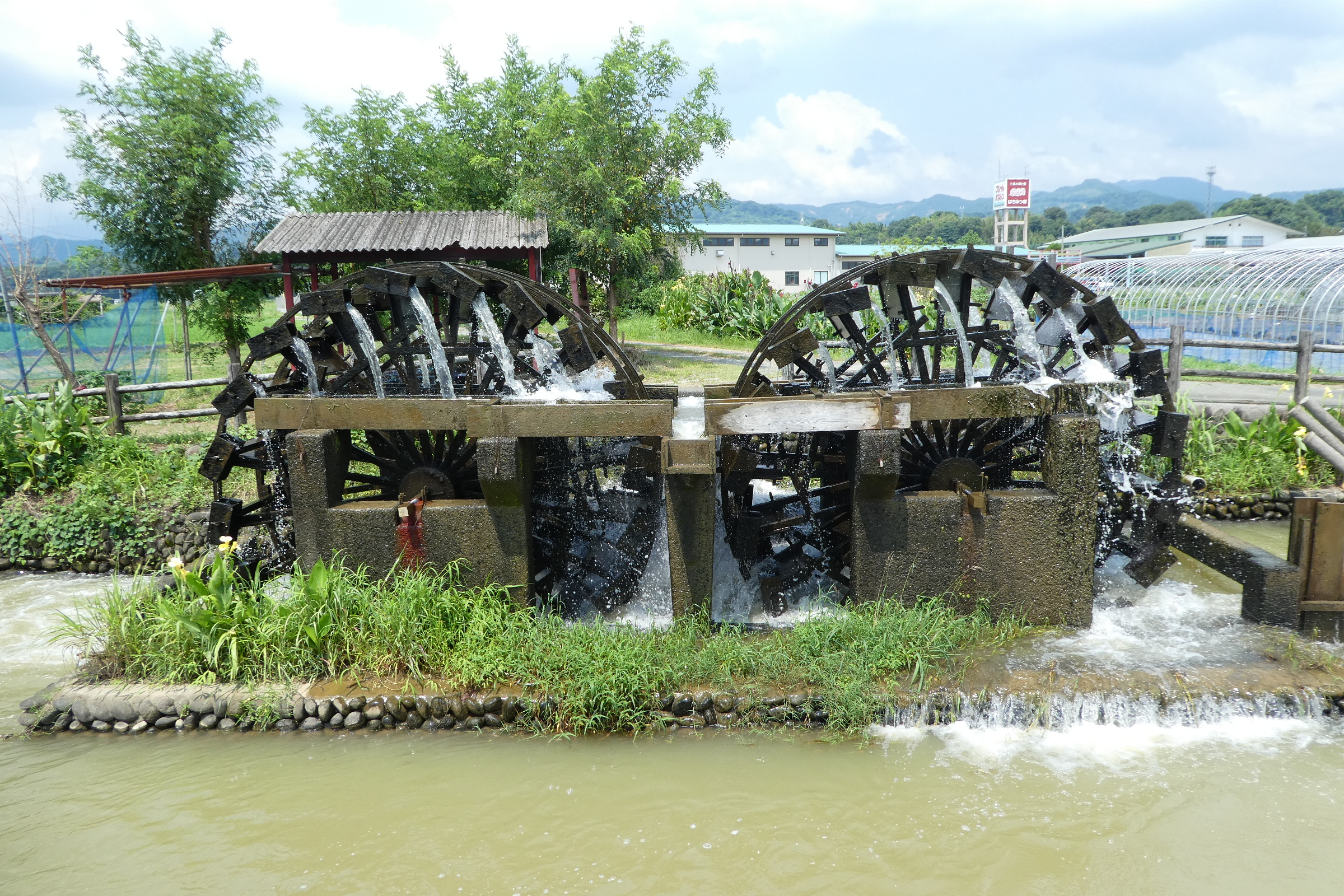
Mishima Suisha

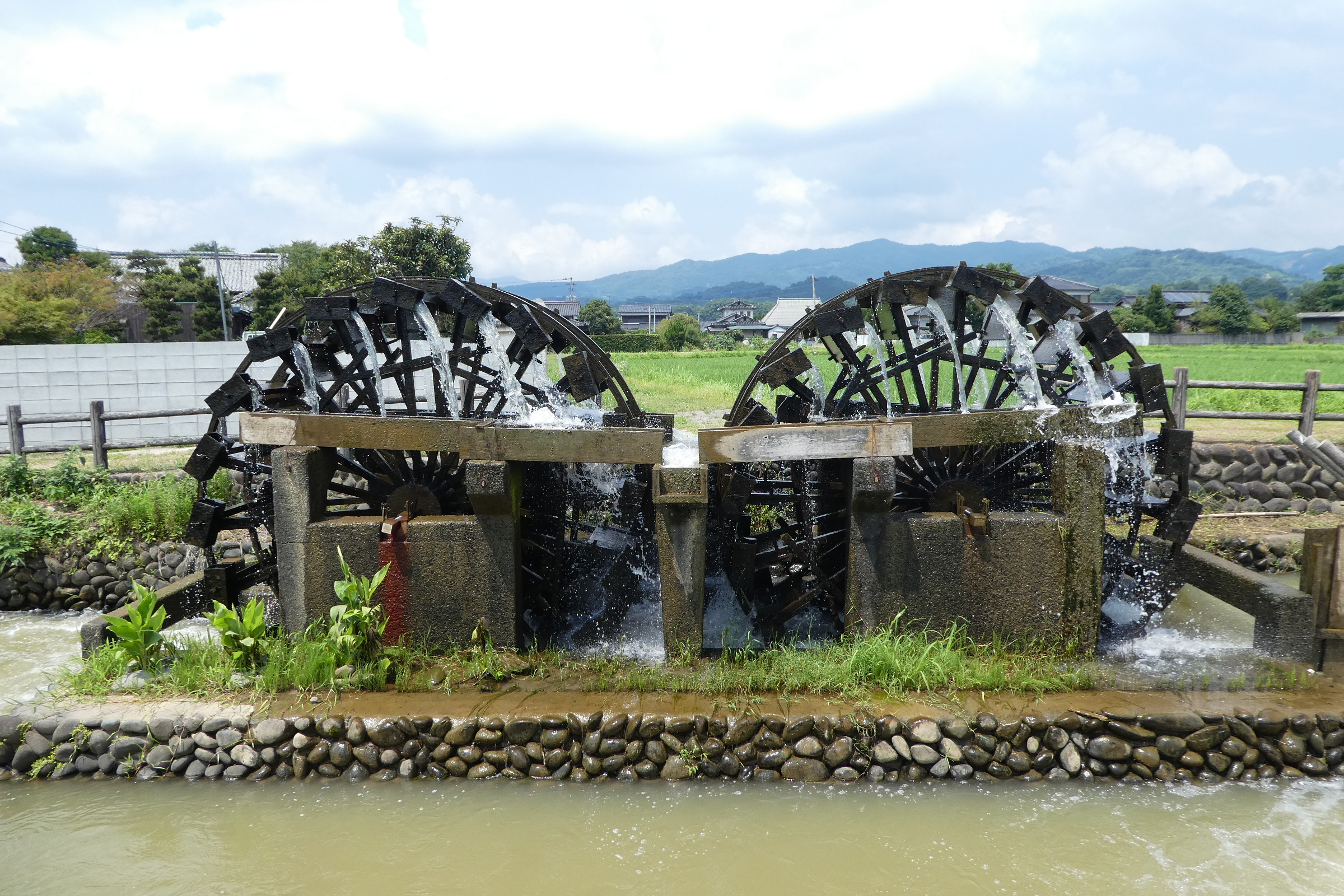
Hisashige Suisha

== See also ==
- List of Historic Sites of Japan (Fukuoka)
