= Akizuki Domain =

Domain of Japan (1623–1871)

Akizuki Domain 秋月藩
- Domain of Japan
- 1623–1871
- Mon of the Kuroda clan
- Capital: Akizuki jin'ya
  - Type: Daimyō
- Historical era: Edo period
  - Established: 1623
  - Disestablished: 1871
- Today part of: Fukuoka Prefecture
- Location of Akizuki Jin'ya Akizuki Domain (Japan)

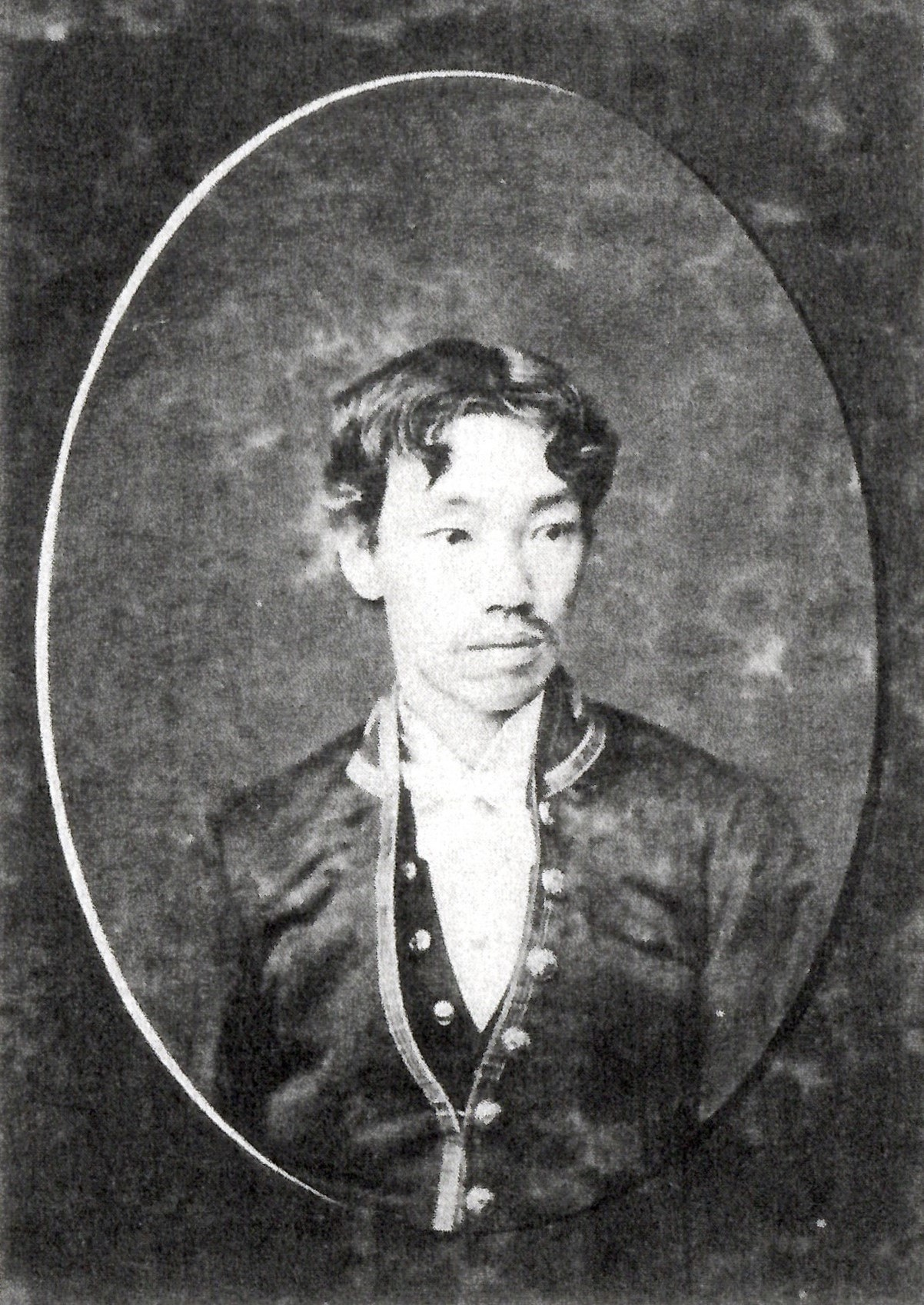
Kuroda Naganori, final daimyo of Akizuki Domain

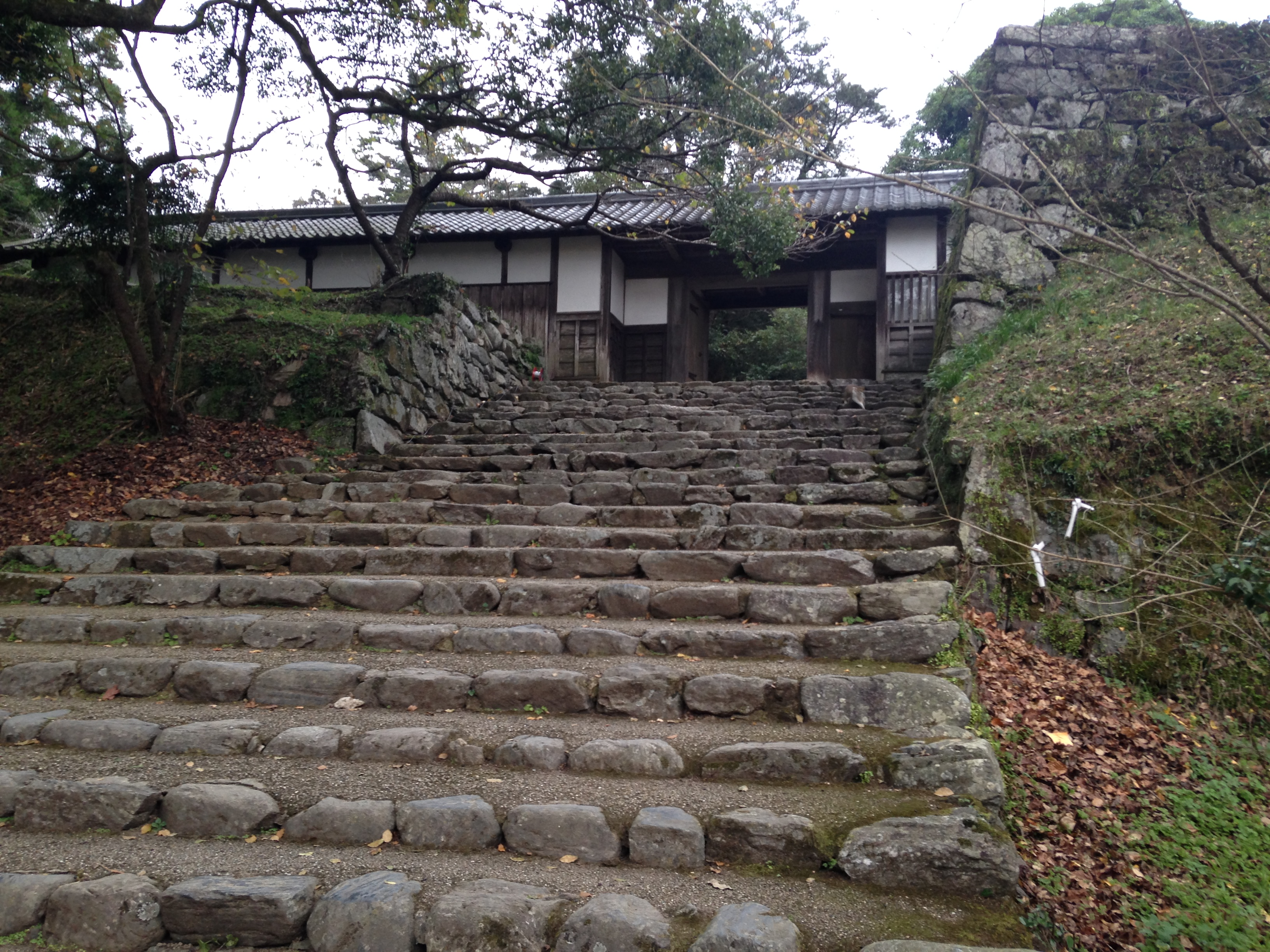
Nagayamon Gate of Akizuki Castle

Akizuki Domain (秋月藩, Akizuki-han) was a Japanese domain of the Edo period. It was regarded as a sub-domain of Fukuoka Domain. It was based at the Akizuki jin'ya in what is now the city of Asakura, Fukuoka. It was ruled by a cadet branch of the tozama daimyō Kuroda clan for all of its history.

== History ==
In 1623, Kuroda Nagamasa's third son, Kuroda Nagaoki, was assigned estates with a kokudaka of 50,000 koku, and allowed to establish a cadet branch of the Kuroda clan, partly as "insurance" to ensure the survival of the parent domain in the event that succession of the main lineage fail. Although the domain has a jin'ya fortified residence as its headquarters, it was permitted the prestige of a "castle-holding domain" by the Tokugawa shogunate as it was built on the site of Akizuki Castle. Haruhime, the daughter of the fourth daimyō, Kuroda Nagasada married into the Akizuki clan of Takanabe Domain, the former masters of this area. Her second son was adopted into the Yonezawa Domain and became the famous Uesugi Yozan.

The borders between Akizuki Domain and Fukuoka Domain were complicated. Fukuoka Domain refused to cede Amagi-juku, a key post town adjacent to the Akizuki jin'ya, due to its strategic importance.

With the abolition of the han system in 1871, Akizuki Domain briefly became "Akizuki Prefecture" and was later incorporated into Fukuoka Prefecture. The Akizuki Kuroda family was granted the title of viscounts in the 1884 kazoku peerage system. Although the jin'ya was sold off in the Meiji period, the site is now home to a Shinto shrine dedicated to Kuroda Nagaoki, and the moat, stone walls, Kuromon (former main gate) and Nagayamon (former back gate) all survive. The site is designated a Fukuoka Prefectural Historic Site and the two gates are Fukuoka Prefectural Designated Tangible Cultural Properties.

In 1876, the area was the site of the Akizuki rebellion, in which former samurai of the domain, disillusioned with the policies of the Meiji government and with the loss of their prestige and stipends attacked local police before being suppressed by the Imperial Japanese Army.

== Holdings at the end of the Edo period ==
As with most domains in the han system, Akizuki Domain consisted of several discontinuous territories calculated to provide the assigned kokudaka, based on periodic cadastral surveys and projected agricultural yields.

- Chikuzen Province
  - 2 villages in Honami District
  - 20 villages in Kama District
  - 11 villages in Geza District
  - 38 villages in Yasu District

== List of daimyō ==
#	Name	Tenure	Courtesy title	Court Rank	kokudaka
Kuroda clan, 1623–1871 (Tozama daimyo)
1	Kuroda Nagaoki (黒田長興)	1623–1665	Kai-no-kami (甲斐守)	Junior 5th Rank, Lower Grade (従五位下)	50,000 koku
2	Kuroda Nagashige (黒田長重)	1665–1710	Kai-no-kami (甲斐守)	Junior 5th Rank, Lower Grade (従五位下)	50,000 koku
3	Kuroda Naganori (黒田長軌)	1710–1715	Oki-no-kami (隠岐守)	Junior 5th Rank, Lower Grade (従五位下)	50,000 koku
4	Kuroda Nagasada (黒田長貞)	1715–1754	Kai-no-kami (甲斐守)	Junior 5th Rank, Lower Grade (従五位下)	50,000 koku
5	Kuroda Nagakuni (黒田長邦)	1754–1762	Kai-no-kami (甲斐守)	Junior 5th Rank, Lower Grade (従五位下)	50,000 koku
6	Kuroda Nagayoshi (黒田長恵)	1762–1774	Kai-no-kami (甲斐守)	Junior 5th Rank, Lower Grade (従五位下)	50,000 koku
7	Kuroda Nagakata (黒田長堅)	1774–1784	-none-	-none-	50,000 koku
8	Kuroda Naganobu (黒田長舒)	1784–1807	Kai-no-kami (甲斐守)	Junior 5th Rank, Lower Grade (従五位下)	50,000 koku
9	Kuroda Nagatsugu (黒田長韶)	1808–1830	Kai-no-kami (甲斐守)	Junior 5th Rank, Lower Grade (従五位下)	50,000 koku
10	Kuroda Nagamoto (黒田長元)	1830–1860	Kai-no-kami (甲斐守)	Junior 5th Rank, Lower Grade (従五位下)	50,000 koku
11	Kuroda Nagayoshi (黒田長義)	1860–1862	Kai-no-kami (甲斐守)	Junior 5th Rank, Lower Grade (従五位下)	50,000 koku
12	Kuroda Naganori (黒田長徳)	1862–1871	Kai-no-kami (甲斐守)	Junior 5th Rank, Lower Grade (従五位下)	50,000 koku

== Notable people from Akizuki Domain ==
- Hara Saihin, kanshi poet and Confucian scholar

== See also ==
- List of Han
- Abolition of the han system
- Akizuki rebellion
