= Japanese oak =

Japanese oak is a common name for several species of plants and may refer to:

- Lithocarpus glaber, a kind of stone oak, found in Japan, China, and Taiwan
- Quercus mongolica subsp. crispula, also known as Mizunara

== See also ==
- Yushun Himba, whose alternative name is Japanese Oaks
