= Japan National Route 386 =

Road in Japan

National Route 386
- 国道386号

Route information
- Length: 46.6 km (29.0 mi)

Location
- Country: Japan

Highway system
- National highways of Japan; Expressways of Japan
← National Route 385	→ National Route 387

National Route 386 is a national highway of Japan connecting Hita, Ōita and Chikushino, Fukuoka in Japan, with a total length of 46.6 km (28.96 mi).
