= Doi Station (Fukuoka) =

Railway station in Fukuoka, Japan

JD 09 Doi Station 土井駅
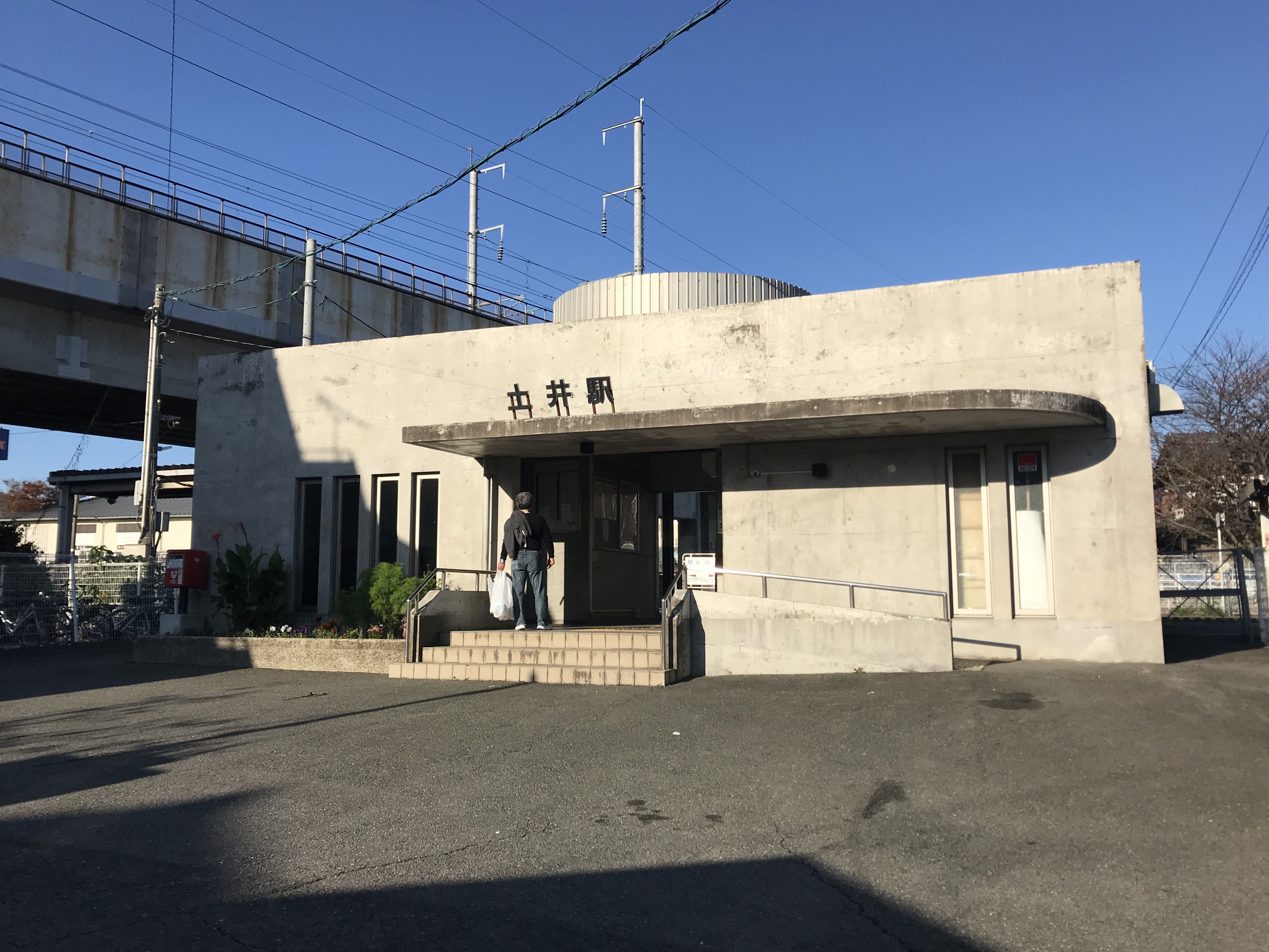
- Doi Station in 2019

General information
- Location: 3-23 Doi, Higashi-ku, Fukuoka-shi, Fukuoka-ken 813-0032; Japan
- Coordinates: 33°38′06″N 130°27′58″E
- Operator: JR Kyushu
- Line: JD Kashii Line
- Distance: 16.4 km from Saitozaki
- Platforms: 2 side platforms
- Tracks: 2

Construction
- Structure type: At grade
- Cycle facilities: Designated parking area for bikes
- Accessible: No - platforms linked by level crossing with steps at both ends

Other information
- Status: Remotely managed station
- Website: Official website

History
- Opened: 1 January 1904

Passengers
- FY2020: 1268 daily
- Rank: 117th (among JR Kyushu stations)

Services
Preceding station	JR Kyushu	Following station
Maimatsubara towards Saitozaki	Kashii Line Local	Iga towards Umi
Location
- Location within Fukuoka Prefecture Location within Japan

Doi Station (土井駅, Doi-eki) is a passenger railway station located in Higashi-ku, Fukuoka, Fukuoka Prefecture, Japan. It is operated by operated by JR Kyushu.

== Lines ==
The station is served by the Kashii Line and is located 16.4 km from the starting point of the line at Saitozaki.

== Station layout ==
The station, which is unstaffed, consists of two side platforms serving two tracks. A station building, a modern concrete structure, houses a waiting area and automatic ticket vending machines. There is a ramp up to the station building from the main road but access to the opposite side platform is by means of a level crossing with steps onto the platforms at both ends. A designated waiting area is provided outside the station. The elevated tracks of the Sanyo Shinkansen run over a part of the station platforms.

=== Platforms ===
1	■ JD Kashii Line	for Kashii and Saitozaki
2	■ JD Kashii Line	for Umi

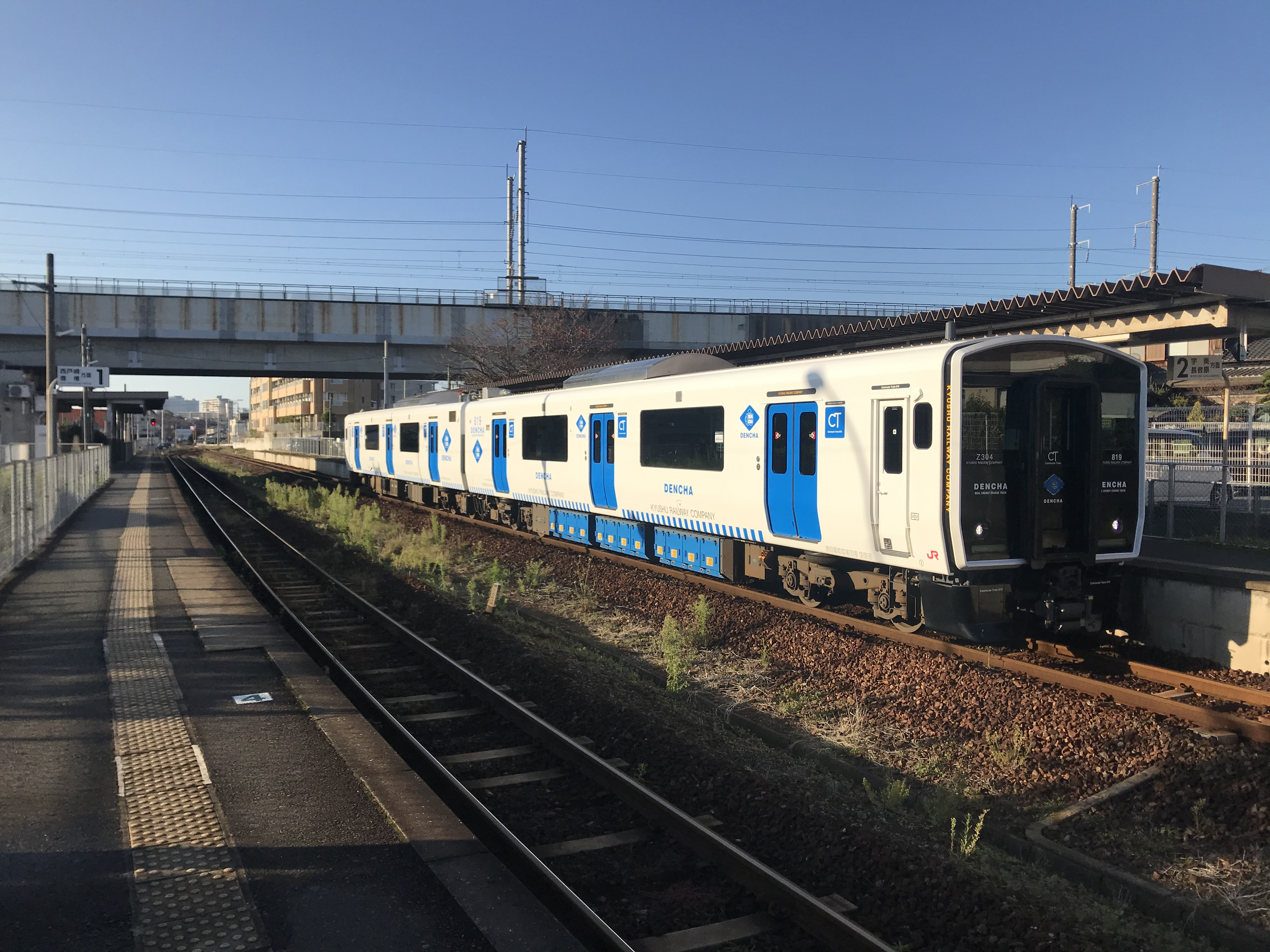
Platform and Shinkansen tracks

== History ==
The station was opened on 1 January 1904 by the private Hakata Bay Railway as an intermediate station on a track it opened between Saitozaki and Sue. On 19 September 1942, the company, now renamed the Hakata Bay Railway and Steamship Company, with a few other companies, merged into the Kyushu Electric Tramway. Three days later, the new conglomerate, which had assumed control of the station, became the Nishi-Nippon Railroad (Nishitetsu). On 1 May 1944, Nishitetsu's track from Saitozaki to Sue and the later extensions to Shinbaru and Umi were nationalized. Japanese Government Railways (JGR) took over control of the station and the track which served it was designated the Kashii Line. With the privatization of Japanese National Railways (JNR), the successor of JGR, on 1 April 1987, JR Kyushu took over control of the station.

On 14 March 2015, the station, along with others on the line, became a remotely managed "Smart Support Station". Under this scheme, although the station became unstaffed, passengers using the automatic ticket vending machines or ticket gates could receive assistance via intercom from staff at a central support centre.

== Passenger statistics ==
In fiscal 2020, the station was used by an average of 1268 passengers daily (boarding passengers only), and it ranked 117th among the busiest stations of JR Kyushu.

== Surrounding area ==
The station is located directly underneath the tracks of the Kyushu Shinkansen.

- Fukuoka City Eastern Agricultural Cooperative Association Tatara Branch/Tatara Agricultural Warehouse
- Nishitetsu Doi Office

== See also ==
- List of railway stations in Japan
