= Iga Station =

Railway station in Kasuya, Fukuoka Prefecture, Japan

JD 10 Iga Station 伊賀駅
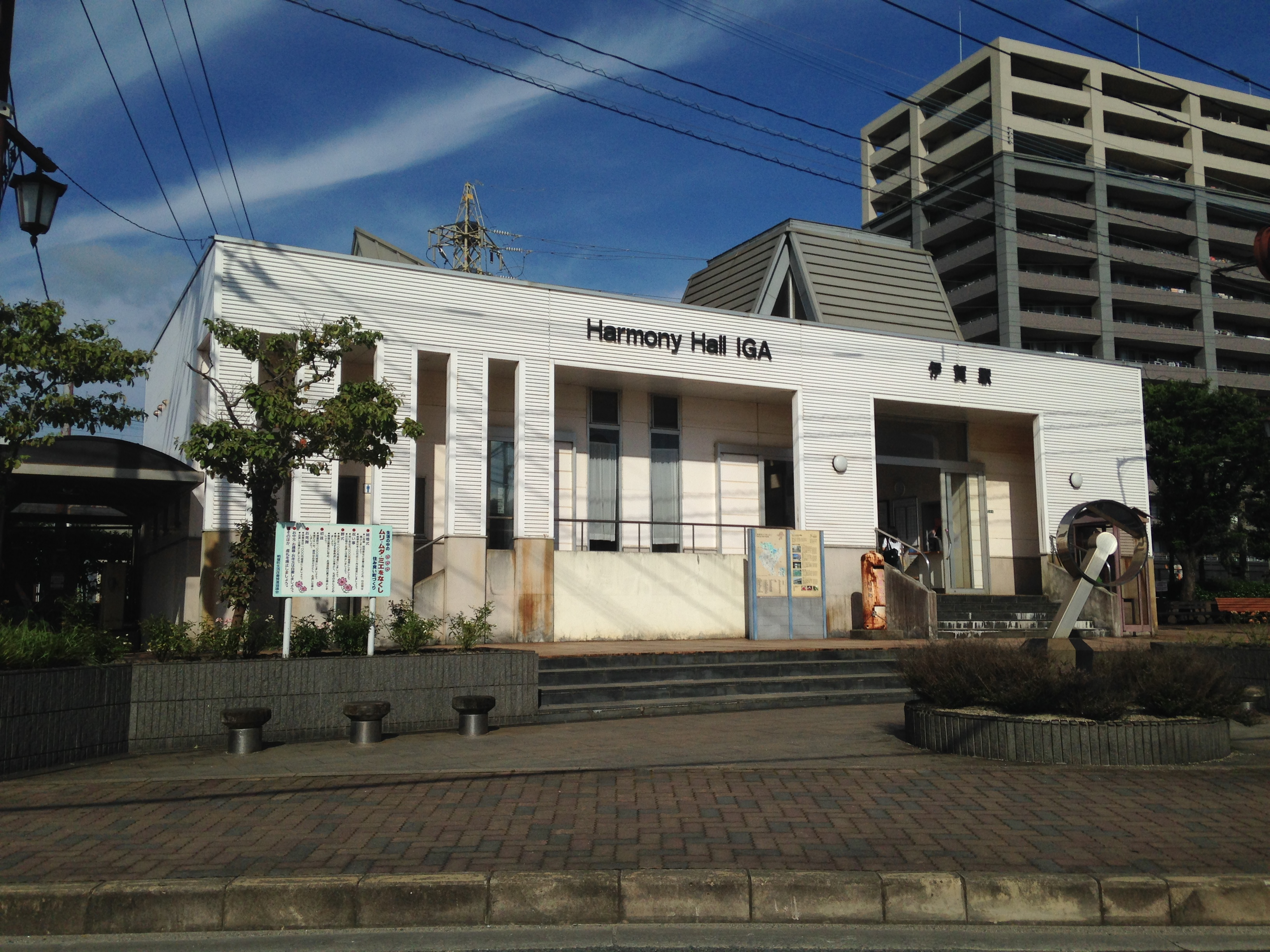
- Iga Station in 2016

General information
- Location: 1-8 Tobarahigashi, Kasuya-machi, Kasuya-gun, Fukuoka-ken 811-2318; Japan
- Coordinates: 33°37′15″N 130°28′25″E
- Operator: JR Kyushu
- Line: JD Kashii Line
- Distance: 18.2 km from Saitozaki
- Platforms: 1 side platform
- Tracks: 1 + 1 siding

Construction
- Structure type: At grade

Other information
- Status: Remotely managed station
- Website: Official website

History
- Opened: 1 January 1904
- Former names: Chōjabaru (until 1 October 1908)

Passengers
- FY2020: 735 daily
- Rank: 177th (among JR Kyushu stations)

Services
Preceding station	JR Kyushu	Following station
Doi towards Saitozaki	Kashii Line Local	Chōjabaru towards Umi
Location
- Location within Fukuoka Prefecture Location within Japan

Iga Station (伊賀駅, Iga-eki) is a passenger railway station located in the town of Kasuya, Fukuoka Prefecture, Japan. It is operated by JR Kyushu.

== Lines ==
The station is served by the Kashii Line and is located 18.2 km from the starting point of the line at Saitozaki.

== Station layout ==
The station, which is unstaffed, consists of a side platform serving a single track. A station building shares facilities with a community facilities called the "Harmony Hall" and houses a small waiting area and automatic ticket machines. A siding branches off the track and is used by track maintenance vehicles. Beside the siding are the traces of a disused freight platform.

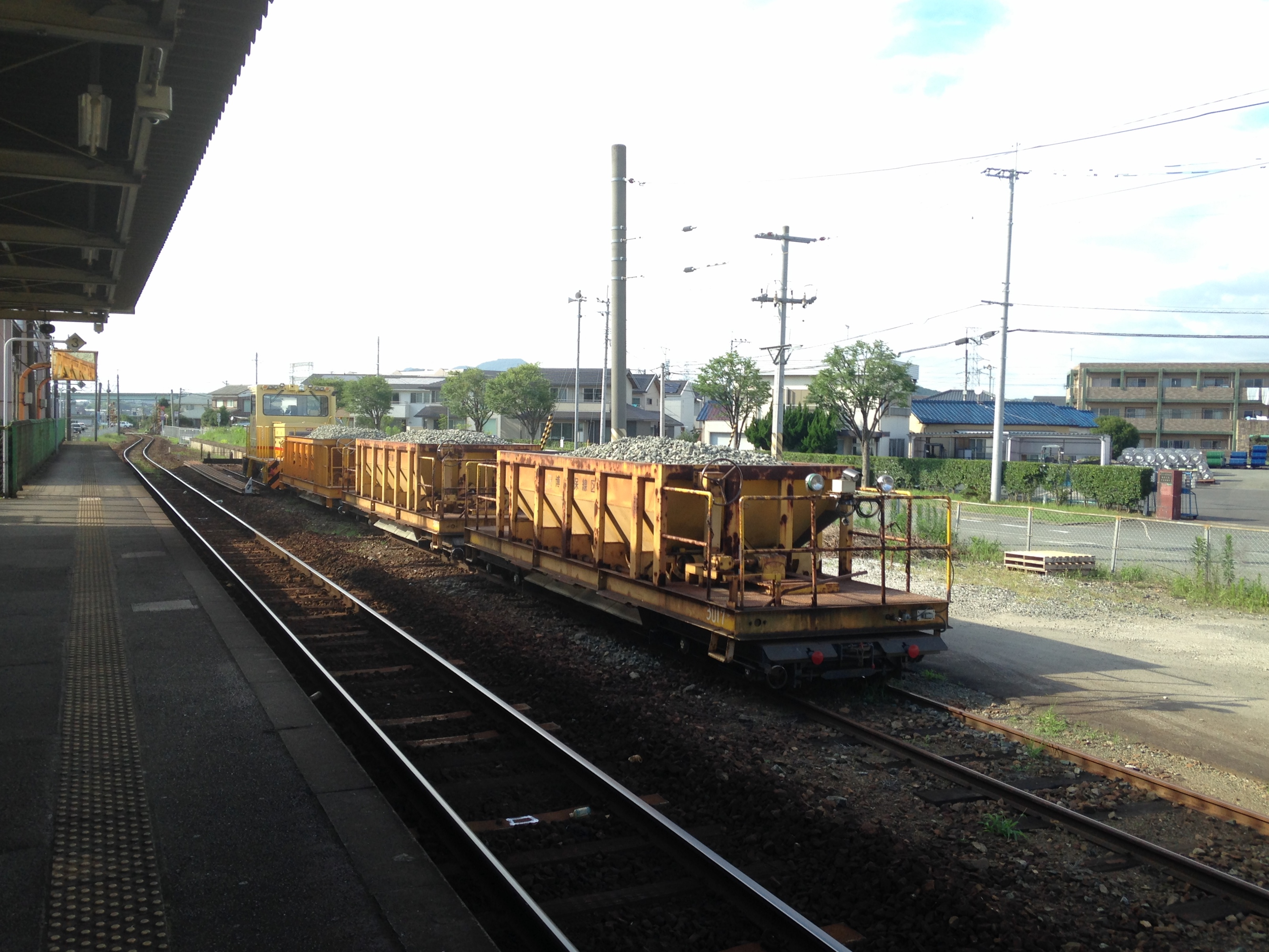
A view of the station platform and track. Note the siding to the right. The disused freight platform is behind the maintenance train.

== History ==
The station was opened on 1 January 1904 with the name Chōjabaru Station (長者原駅, Chōjabaru-eki) by the private Hakata Bay Railway as an intermediate station on a track it opened between Saitozaki and Sue. On 1 October 1908, the name was changed to Iga. On 19 September 1942, the company, now renamed the Hakata Bay Railway and Steamship Company, with a few other companies, merged into the Kyushu Electric Tramway. Three days later, the new conglomerate, which had assumed control of the station, became the Nishi-Nippon Railroad (Nishitetsu). On 1 May 1944, Nishitetsu's track from Saitozaki to Sue and the later extensions to Shinbaru and Umi were nationalized. Japanese Government Railways (JGR) took over control of the station and the track which served it was designated the Kashii Line. With the privatization of Japanese National Railways (JNR), the successor of JGR, on 1 April 1987, JR Kyushu took over control of the station. When a new station located next on the line was opened in 1988, the old name of Chōjabaru was given to it.

On 14 March 2015, the station, along with others on the line, became a remotely managed "Smart Support Station". Under this scheme, although the station became unstaffed, passengers using the automatic ticket vending machines or ticket gates could receive assistance via intercom from staff at a central support centre.

== Passenger statistics ==
In fiscal 2020, there was a daily average of 735 boarding passengers at this station, making it the 177th busiest station on the JR Kyushu network.。

== Surrounding area ==
The station is located slightly north of the center of Kasuya-cho. The surrounding area is a residential area.

- Fukuoka Prefectural Fukuoka Kaisei High School
- Kasuya Town Kasuya Higashi Junior High School
- Kasuya Town Okawa Elementary School

== See also ==
- List of railway stations in Japan
