= Sakado Station (Fukuoka) =

Railway station in Kasuya, Fukuoka Prefecture, Japan

JD 12 Sakado Station 酒殿駅
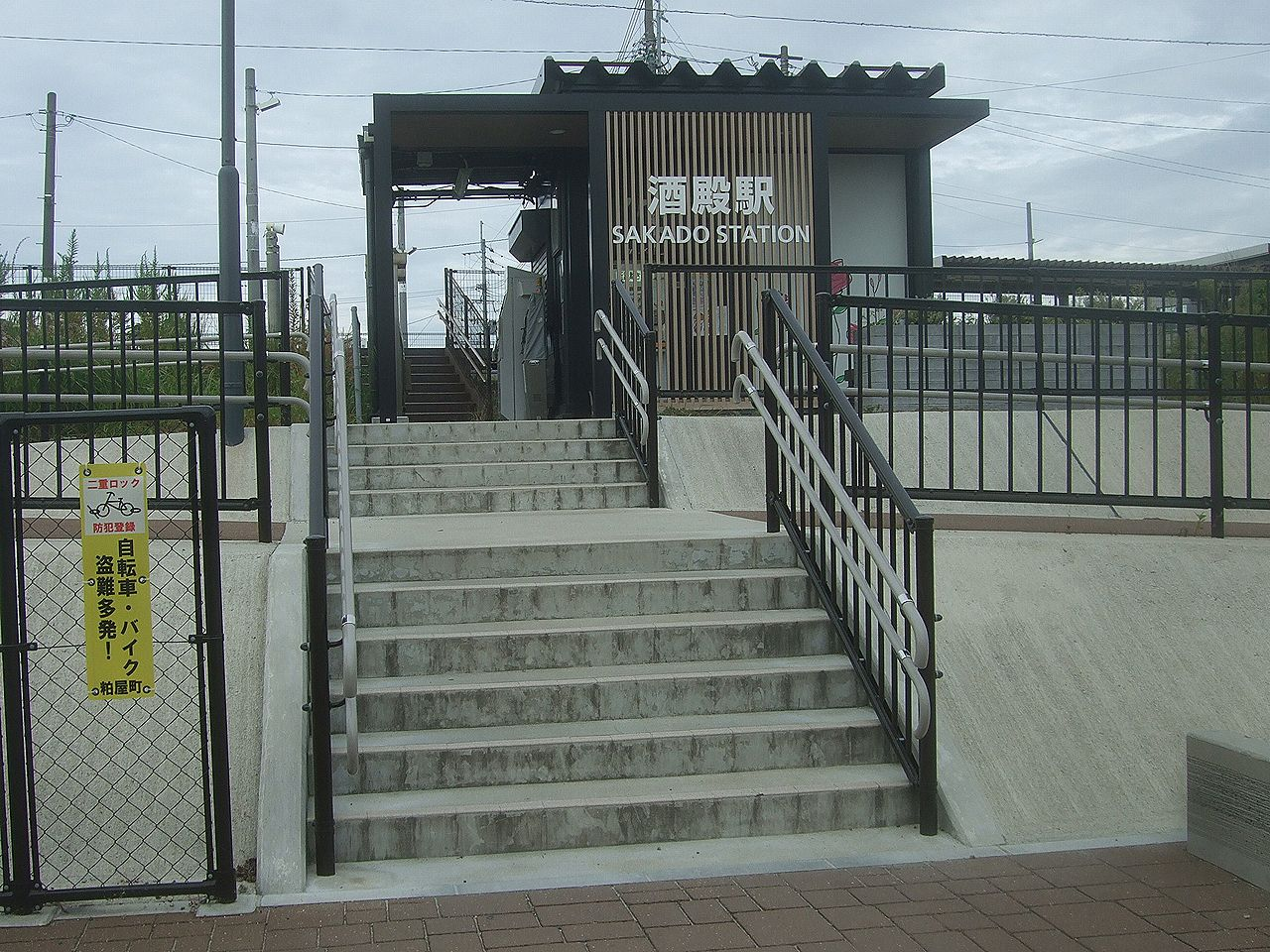
- Sakado Station in 2023

General information
- Location: 5-chōme-12 Sakado, Kasuya-machi, Kasuya-gun, Fukuoka-ken 811-2303; Japan
- Coordinates: 33°36′09″N 130°29′10″E
- Operator: JR Kyushu
- Line: JD Kashii Line
- Distance: 20.6 km from Saitozaki
- Platforms: 2 side platforms
- Tracks: 2

Construction
- Structure type: Embankment
- Cycle facilities: Bike shed
- Accessible: No - steps up embankment to station building and platform

Other information
- Status: Remotely managed station
- Website: Official website

History
- Opened: 1 January 1904

Passengers
- FY2020: 557 daily
- Rank: 202nd (among JR Kyushu stations)

Services
Preceding station	JR Kyushu	Following station
Chōjabaru towards Saitozaki	Kashii Line Local	Sue towards Umi
Location
- Location within Fukuoka Prefecture Location within Japan

Sakado Station (酒殿駅, Sakado-eki) is a passenger railway station located in the town of Kasuya, Fukuoka Prefecture, Japan. It is operated by JR Kyushu.

== Lines ==
The station is served by the Kashii Line and is located 20.6 km from the starting point of the line at Saitozaki.

== Station layout ==
The station, which is unstaffed, consists of two side platforms serving two tracks on an embankment. The station building houses a waiting room and has a glassed-in area with an automatic ticket machine. Bike sheds are provided at the base of the embankment from which a flight of steps leads up to the station building. Access to the opposite platform is by means of a level crossing with steps at both ends to the platforms.

=== Platforms ===
1	■ JD Kashii Line	for Kashii and Saitozaki
2	■ JD Kashii Line	for Umi

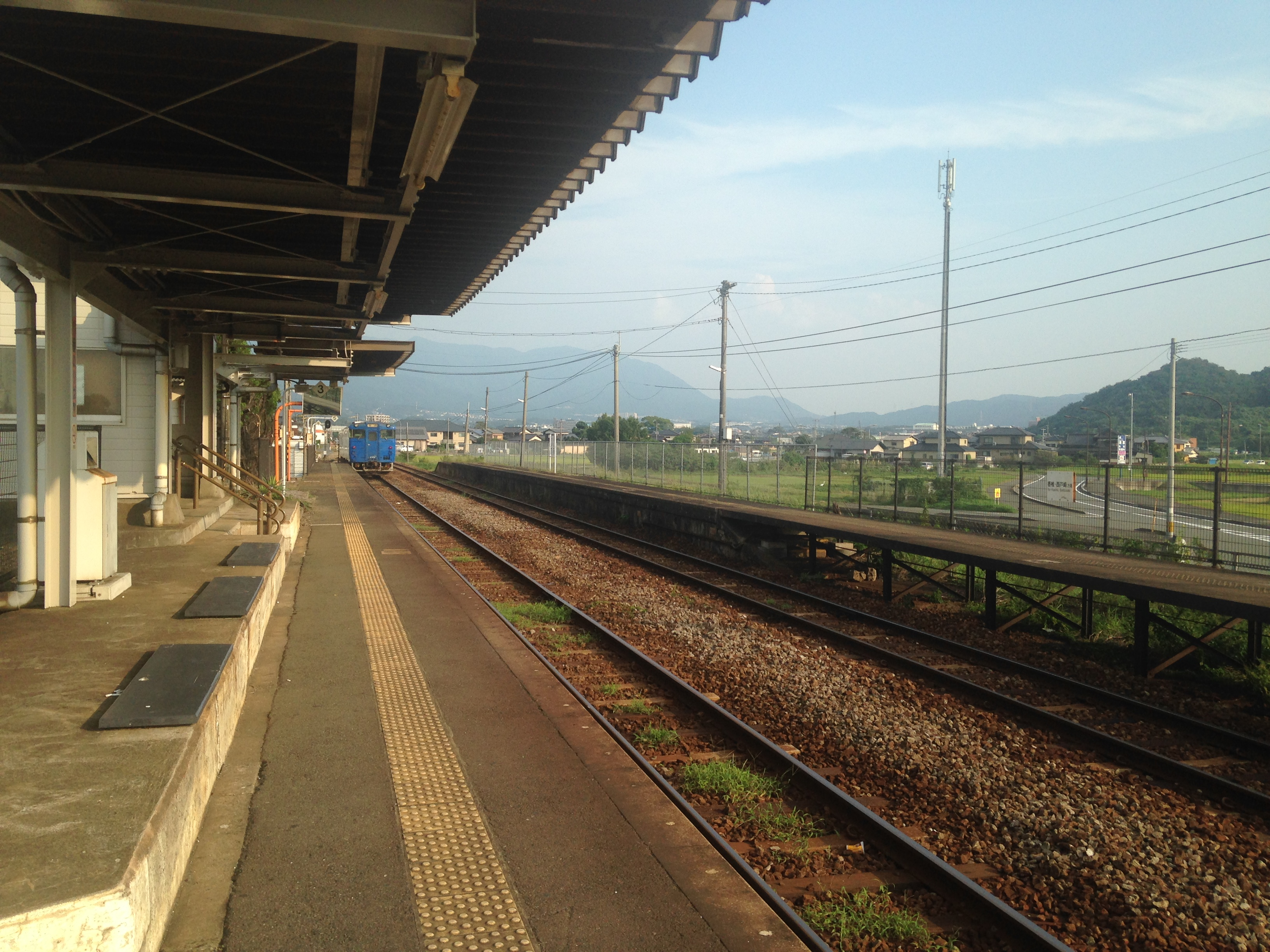
A view of the station platforms and tracks.

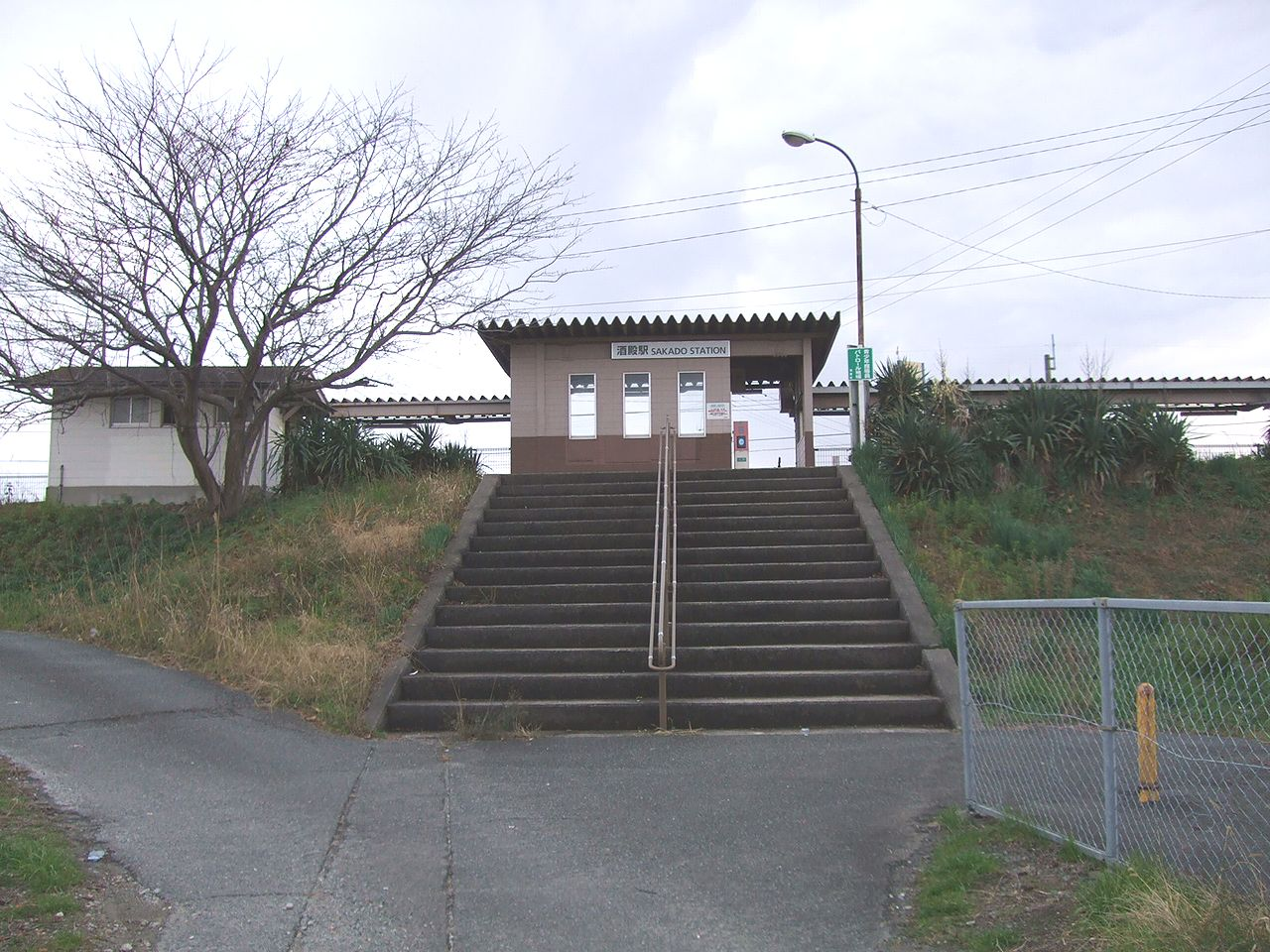
A broad flight of steps up the embankment to the station building.

== History ==
The station was opened on 1 January 1904 by the private Hakata Bay Railway as an intermediate station on a track it opened between Saitozaki and Sue. On 19 September 1942, the company, now renamed the Hakata Bay Railway and Steamship Company, with a few other companies, merged into the Kyushu Electric Tramway. Three days later, the new conglomerate, which had assumed control of the station, became the Nishi-Nippon Railroad (Nishitetsu). On 1 May 1944, Nishitetsu's track from Saitozaki to Sue and the later extensions to Shinbaru and Umi were nationalized. Japanese Government Railways (JGR) took over control of the station and the track which served it was designated the Kashii Line. With the privatization of Japanese National Railways (JNR), the successor of JGR, on 1 April 1987, JR Kyushu took over control of the station.

Shortly after opening, the station was closed on 21 July 1905. It opened again on 1 August 1909 when a branch line for freight only was built from it to Shime (志免). On 11 March 1915, the freight line was further extended to Tabi-ishi (旅石). Tabi-ishi was closed on 15 December 1960 and Shime, together with the entire branch line, was closed on 1 January 1985.

On 14 March 2015, the station, along with others on the line, became a remotely managed "Smart Support Station". Under this scheme, although the station became unstaffed, passengers using the automatic ticket vending machines or ticket gates could receive assistance via intercom from staff at a central support centre.

== Passenger statistics ==
In fiscal 2020, there was a daily average of 557 boarding passengers at this station, making it the 202nd busiest station on the JR Kyushu network.。

== Surrounding area ==
During the JNR era, the area was rural and sparsely populated, but since the 2000s, large-scale commercial facilities have expanded nearby, and the number of condominiums and single-family homes has increased rapidly.

== See also ==
- List of railway stations in Japan
