= Kashii =

Kashii may refer to:

== Places ==
- Kashii, Japan, a district in Higashi-ku, Fukuoka
- Kashii-gū, a Shinto shrine in Fukuoka

== Ships ==
- Japanese cruiser Kashii, a WWII vessel

== Rail transport ==
- Kashii Line, a railway line in Fukuoka
- Kashii Station, a railway station in Fukuoka
- Nishitetsu Kashii Station, a railway station in Fukuoka
- Kashii-Jingū Station, a railway station in Fukuoka

== People ==
- Kōhei Kashii (1881–1954), Japanese general
- Yuu Kashii (born 1987), Japanese actress

== Other uses ==
- Battle of Kashii, a 1615 battle near Osaka
- Kashii, a character in One Piece
