= Shinbaru Station =

Railway station in Sue, Fukuoka Prefecture, Japan

JD 15 Shinbaru Station 新原駅
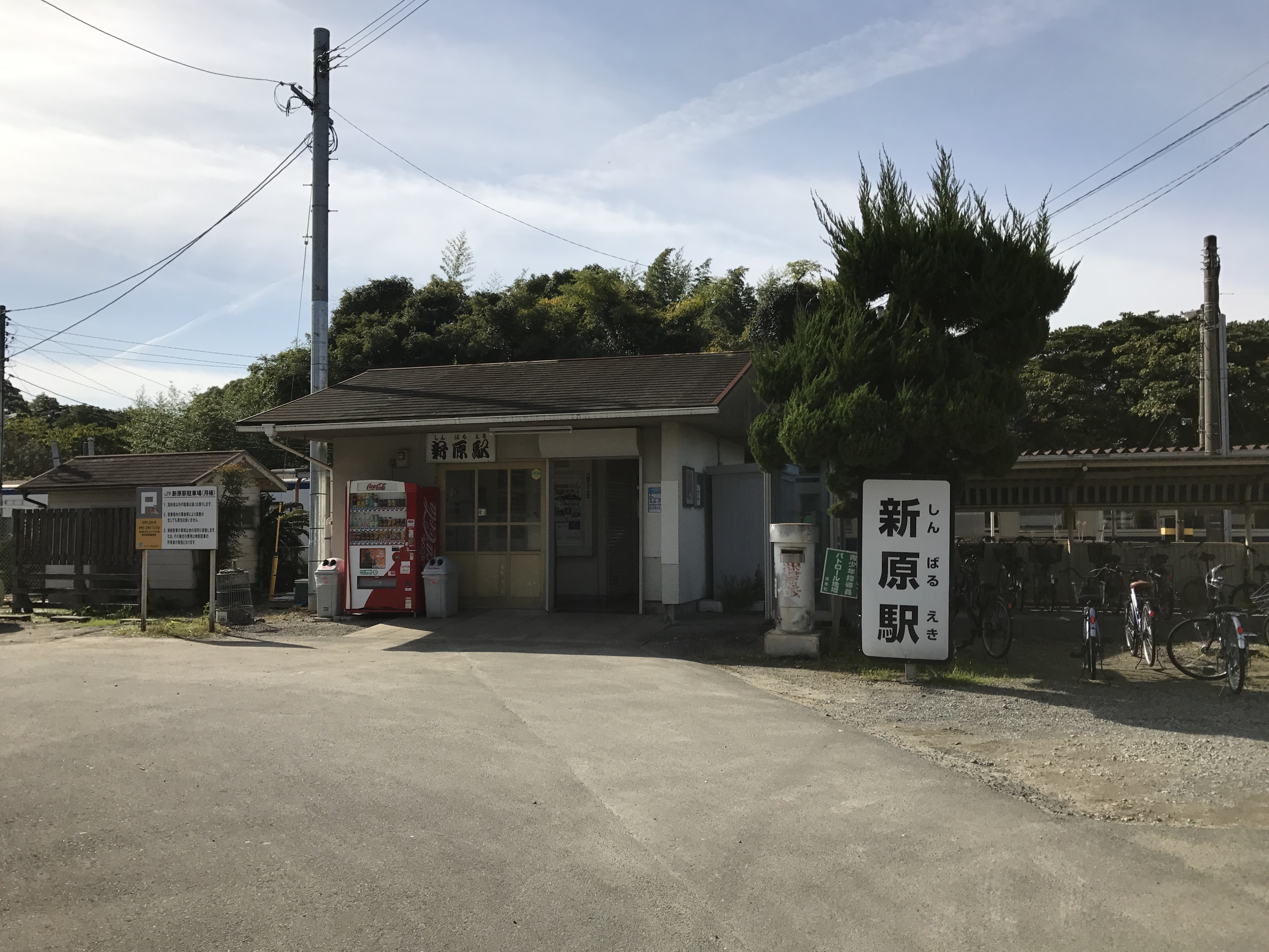
- Shinbaru Station in 2016

General information
- Location: Shinbaru, Sue-machi, Kasuya-gun, Fukuoka-ken 811-2111; Japan
- Coordinates: 33°34′45″N 130°30′32″E
- Operator: JR Kyushu
- Line: JD Kashii Line
- Distance: 21.1 km from Saitozaki
- Platforms: 2 side platforms
- Tracks: 2

Construction
- Structure type: At grade
- Cycle facilities: Bike shed
- Accessible: No - platforms linked by level crossing with steps at both ends

Other information
- Status: Remotely managed station
- Website: Official website

History
- Opened: 3 June 1905

Services
Preceding station	JR Kyushu	Following station
Sue-Chūō towards Saitozaki	Kashii Line Local	Umi Terminus
Location
- Location within Fukuoka Prefecture Location within Japan

Shinbaru Station (新原駅, Shinbaru-eki) is a passenger railway station located in the town of Sue, Fukuoka Prefecture, Japan. It is operated by JR Kyushu.

== Lines ==
The station is served by the Kashii Line and is located 21.1 km from the starting point of the line at Saitozaki.

== Station layout ==
The station, which is unstaffed, consists of two side platforms serving two tracks. A station building, a small hut in traditional Japanese style, houses a waiting area and automatic ticket vending machines. Access to the opposite side platform is by means of a level crossing with steps onto the platforms at both ends. A bike shed is provided at the station forecourt.

=== Platforms ===
1	■ JD Kashii Line	for Kashii and Saitozaki
2	■ JD Kashii Line	for Umi

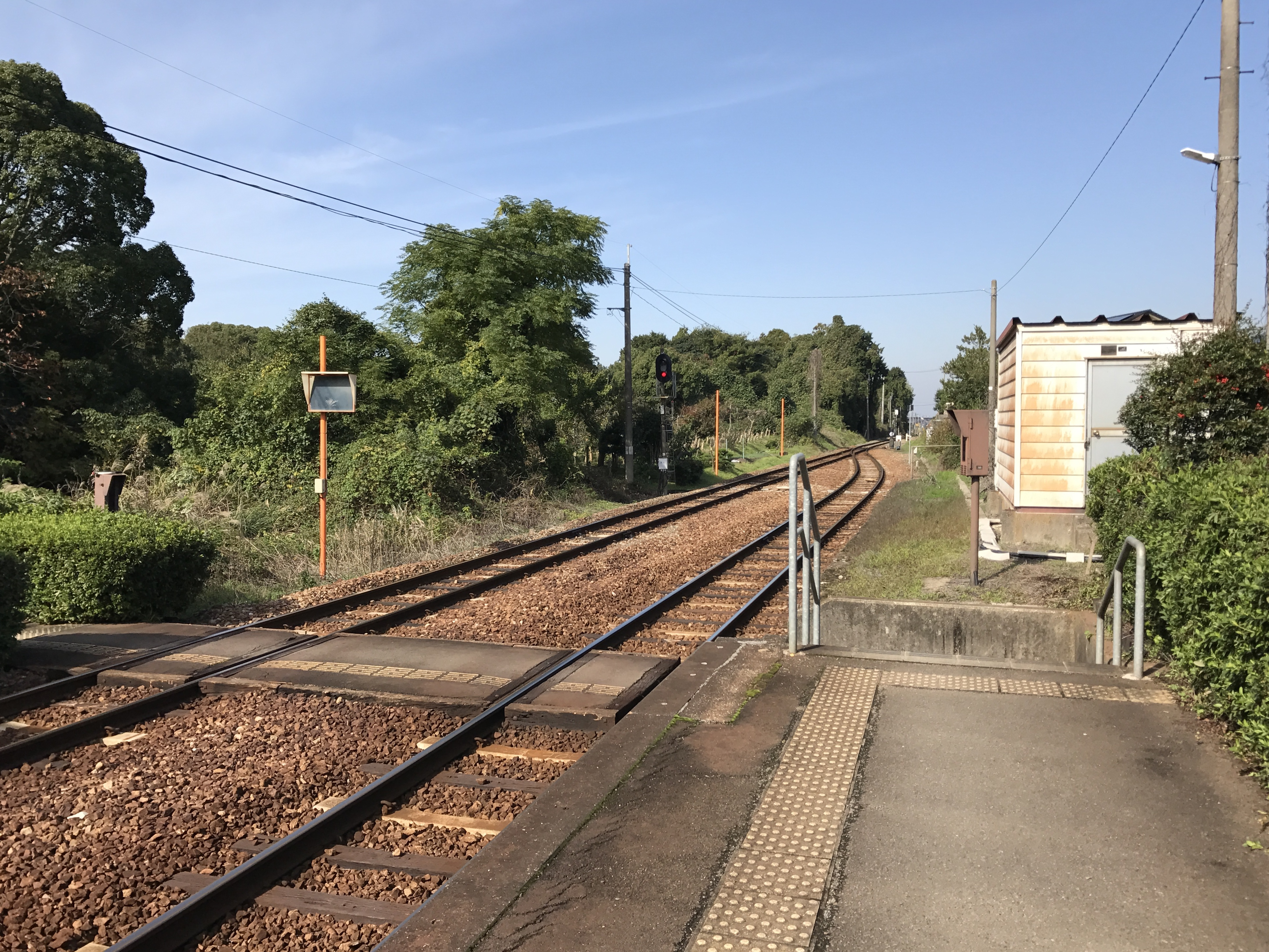
View of the platforms and tracks. Note the level crossing.

== History ==
The private Hakata Bay Railway had opened a track on 1 January 1904 from Saitozaki to its southern terminus at Sue. On 3 June 1905 the track was extended and Shinbaru was opened as the new southern terminus. It became a through-station on 29 December 1905 when the track was further extended to Umi. On 19 September 1942, the company, now renamed the Hakata Bay Railway and Steamship Company, with a few other companies, merged into the Kyushu Electric Tramway. Three days later, the new conglomerate, which had assumed control of the station, became the Nishi-Nippon Railroad (Nishitetsu). On 1 May 1944, Nishitetsu's track from Saitozaki to Umi were nationalized. Japanese Government Railways (JGR) took over control of the station and the track which served it was designated the Kashii Line. With the privatization of Japanese National Railways (JNR), the successor of JGR, on 1 April 1987, JR Kyushu took over control of the station.

On 14 March 2015, the station, along with others on the line, became a remotely managed "Smart Support Station". Under this scheme, although the station became unstaffed, passengers using the automatic ticket vending machines or ticket gates could receive assistance via intercom from staff at a central support centre.

== Passenger statistics ==
In fiscal 2016, the daily average number of passengers using the station (boarding passengers only) was more than 100 but less than 323.

== Surrounding area ==
It is the southernmost part of Sue Town, and there is a residential area in front of the station. Behind the station is a reservoir. The site where Shinbaru Park and Shinbaru Community Center are located in front of the Shinbaru bus stop on the east side of the station is the former site of the 4th pit entrance of the Navy Coal Mine and the site of the headquarters office of the Navy Coal Mine.

== See also ==
- List of railway stations in Japan
