= Sue-Chūō Station =

Railway station in Sue, Fukuoka Prefecture, Japan

JD 14 Sue-Chūō Station 須恵中央駅
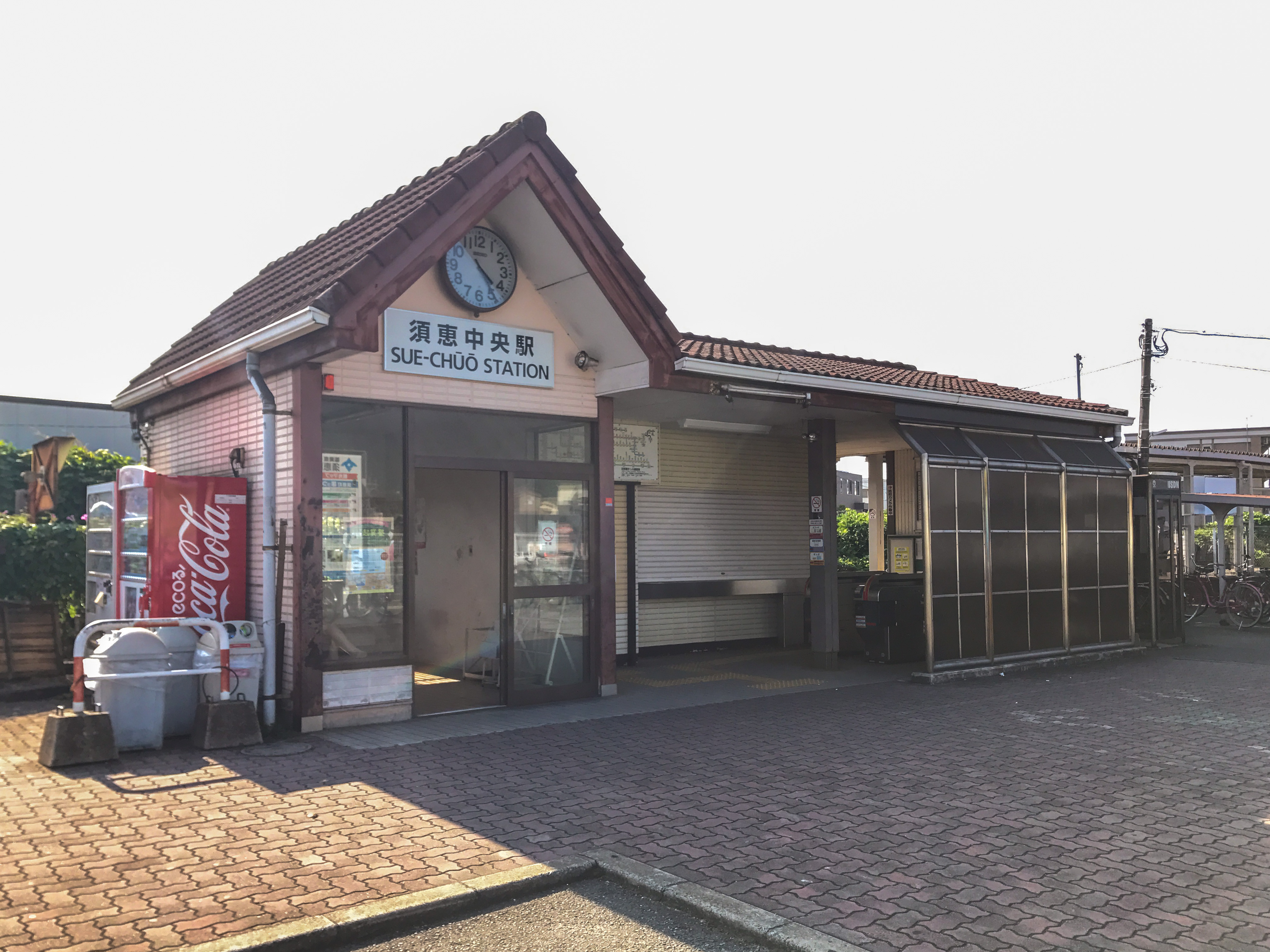
- Sue-Chūō Station in 2017

General information
- Location: 806 Sue, Sue-machi, Kasuya-gun, Fukuoka-ken 811-2113; Japan
- Coordinates: 33°35′13″N 130°30′18″E
- Operator: JR Kyushu
- Line: JD Kashii Line
- Distance: 23.1 km from Saitozaki
- Platforms: 1 side platform
- Tracks: 1

Construction
- Structure type: At grade
- Cycle facilities: Bike sheds

Other information
- Status: Remotely managed station
- Website: Official website

History
- Opened: 11 March 1989

Passengers
- FY2020: 1155 daily
- Rank: 123rd (among JR Kyushu stations)

Services
Preceding station	JR Kyushu	Following station
Sue towards Saitozaki	Kashii Line Local	Shinbaru towards Umi
Location
- Location within Fukuoka Prefecture Location within Japan

Sue-Chūō Station (須恵中央駅, Sue-Chūō-eki) is a passenger railway station located in the town of Sue, Fukuoka Prefecture, Japan. It is operated by JR Kyushu.

== Lines ==
The station is served by the Kashii Line and is located 23.1 km from the starting point of the line at Saitozaki.

== Station layout ==
The station, which is unstaffed, consists of a side platform serving one track. The station building is modern, with a tiled roof, and includes a small waiting area and automatic ticket machines. A bike shed is provided next to the station building, and another one is located on the station forecourt opposite.

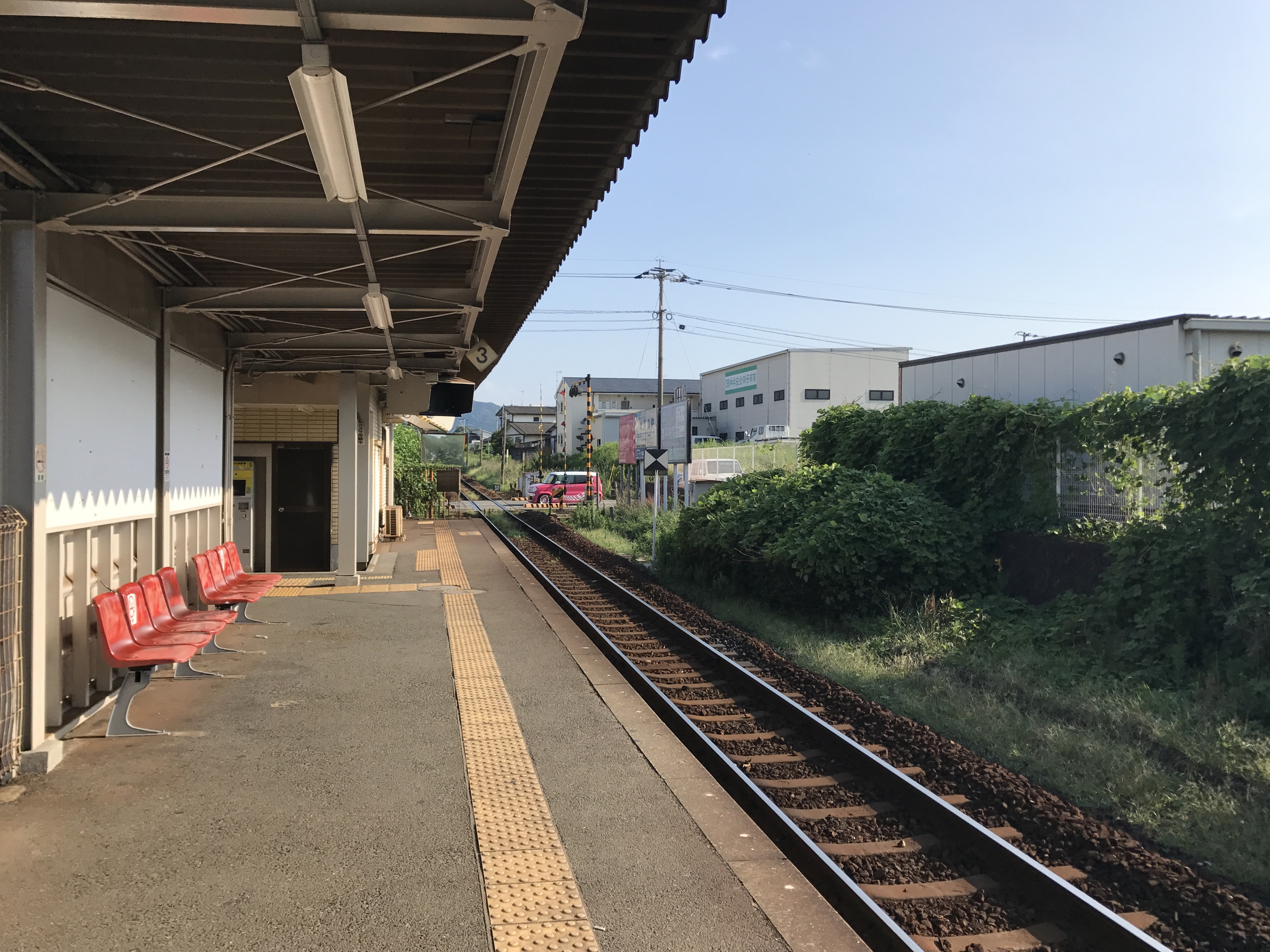
A view of the station platform and track.

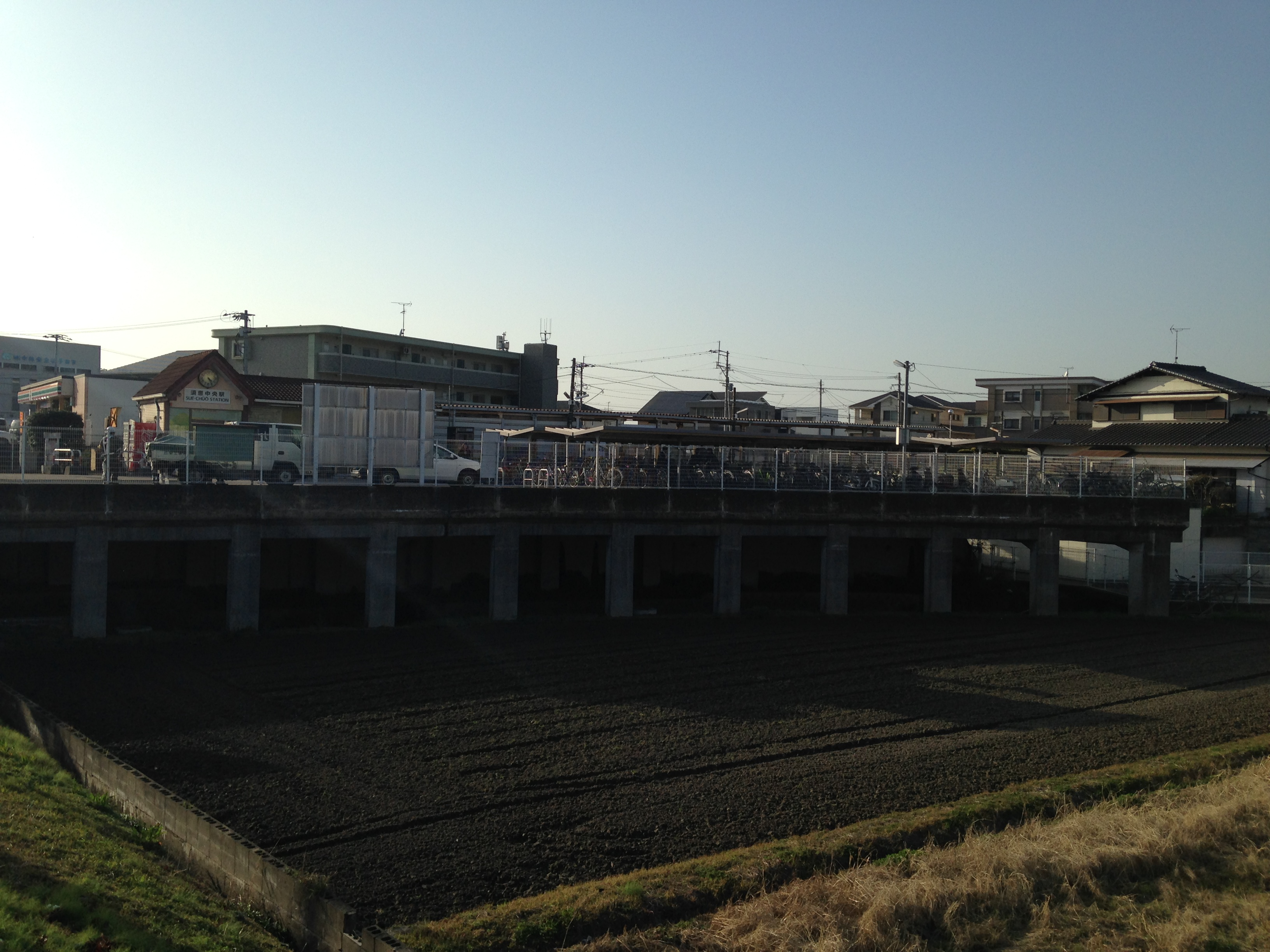
A view of the station forecourt.

== History ==
The station was opened by JR Kyushu on 11 March 1989 as an additional station on the existing track of the Kashii Line.

On 14 March 2015, the station, along with others on the line, became a remotely managed "Smart Support Station". Under this scheme, although the station became unstaffed, passengers using the automatic ticket vending machines or ticket gates could receive assistance via intercom from staff at a central support centre.

== Passenger statistics ==
In fiscal 2020, there was a daily average of 1155 boarding passengers at this station, making it the 123rd busiest station on the JR Kyushu network.。

== Surrounding area ==
- Sue Town Hall
- Fukuoka Prefectural Sue High School

== See also ==
- List of railway stations in Japan
