= Sue Station =

Sue Station is the name of two train stations in Japan:

1. Sue Station (Fukuoka) (須恵駅)
2. Sue Station (Kagawa) (陶駅)
