= Kashii-Jingū Station =

Railway station in Fukuoka, Japan

JD 07 Kashii-Jingū Station 香椎神宮駅
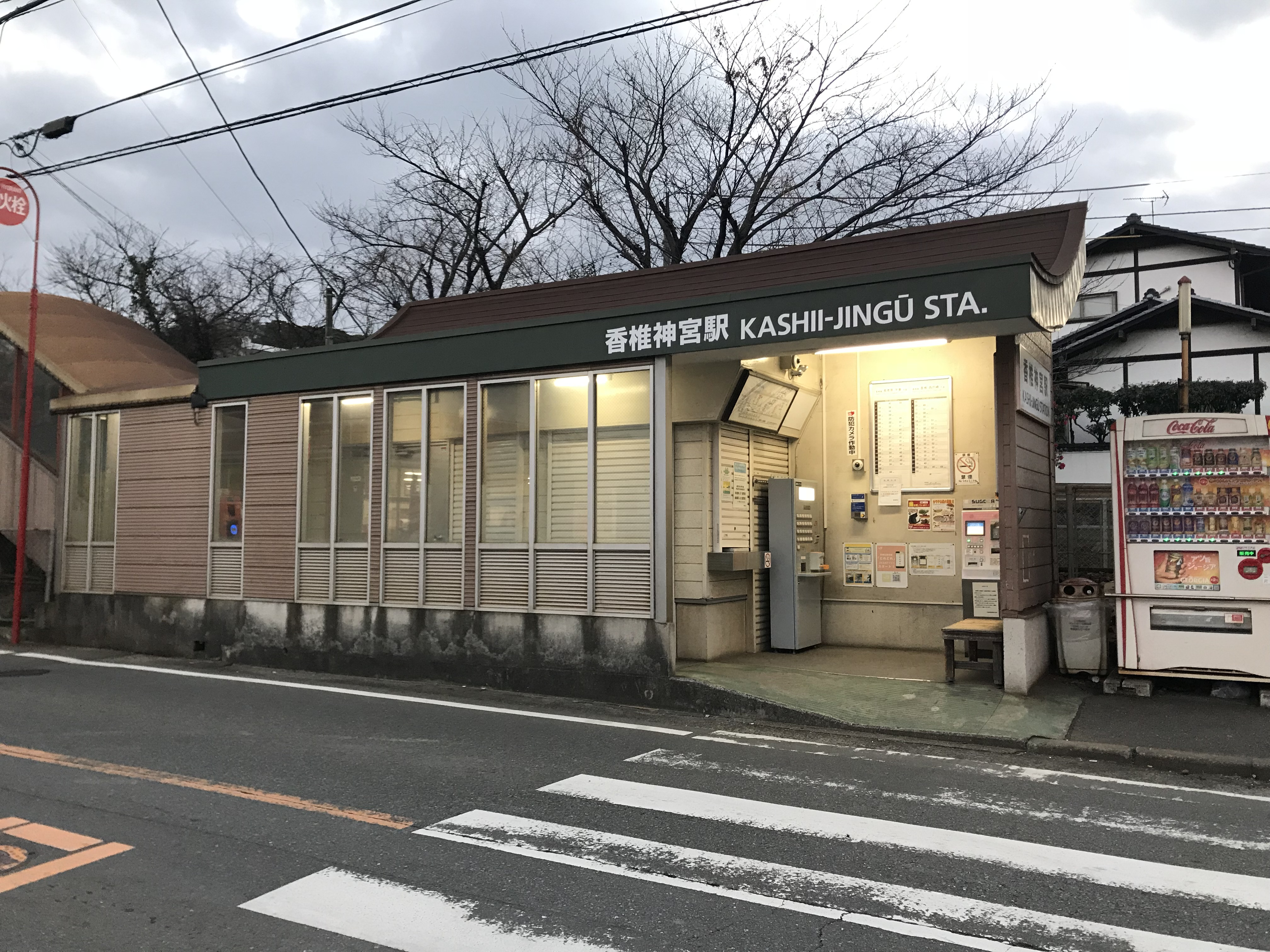
- Kashii-Jingū Station in 2018

General information
- Location: 6 Chome-42 Kashii, Higashi-ku, Fukuoka-shi, Fukuoka-ken 813-0011; Japan
- Coordinates: 33°38′59″N 130°27′09″E
- Operator: JR Kyushu
- Line: JD Kashii Line
- Distance: 14.2 km from Saitozaki
- Platforms: 1 side platform
- Tracks: 1

Construction
- Structure type: At grade
- Cycle facilities: Designated parking area for bikes
- Accessible: No - steps to platform

Other information
- Status: Remotely managed station
- Website: Official website

History
- Opened: 13 March 1988

Passengers
- FY2020: 815 daily
- Rank: 160th (among JR Kyushu stations)

Services
Preceding station	JR Kyushu	Following station
Kashii towards Saitozaki	Kashii Line Local	Maimatsubara towards Umi
Location
- Location within Fukuoka Prefecture Location within Japan

Kashii-Jingū Station (香椎神宮駅, Kashii-Jingū-eki) is a passenger railway station located in Higashi-ku, Fukuoka Prefecture, Japan. It is operated by JR Kyushu.

== Lines ==
The station is served by the Kashii Line and is located 14.2 km from the starting point of the line at Saitozaki.

== Station layout ==
The station, which is unstaffed, consists of a side platform serving a single track. A station building, no more than a narrow shed on the pavement, houses a small waiting area and automatic ticket vending machines. Access to the platform is by a short flight of steps after the automatic ticket gates. A designated parking area for bikes is provided outside the station.

== History ==
The station was opened by JR Kyushu on 13 March 1988 as an additional station on the existing track of the Kashii Line.

On 14 March 2015, the station became a remotely managed "Smart Support Station". Under this scheme, although the station became unstaffed, passengers using the automatic ticket vending machines or ticket gates could receive assistance via intercom from staff at a central support centre.

== Passenger statistics ==
In fiscal 2020, the station was used by an average of 815 passengers daily (boarding passengers only), and it ranked 160th among the busiest stations of JR Kyushu.

== Surrounding area ==
- Kashii-gū
- Fukuoka City Kashiihigashi Elementary School

== See also ==
- List of railway stations in Japan
