= Umi, Fukuoka =

Umi 宇美町
- Town
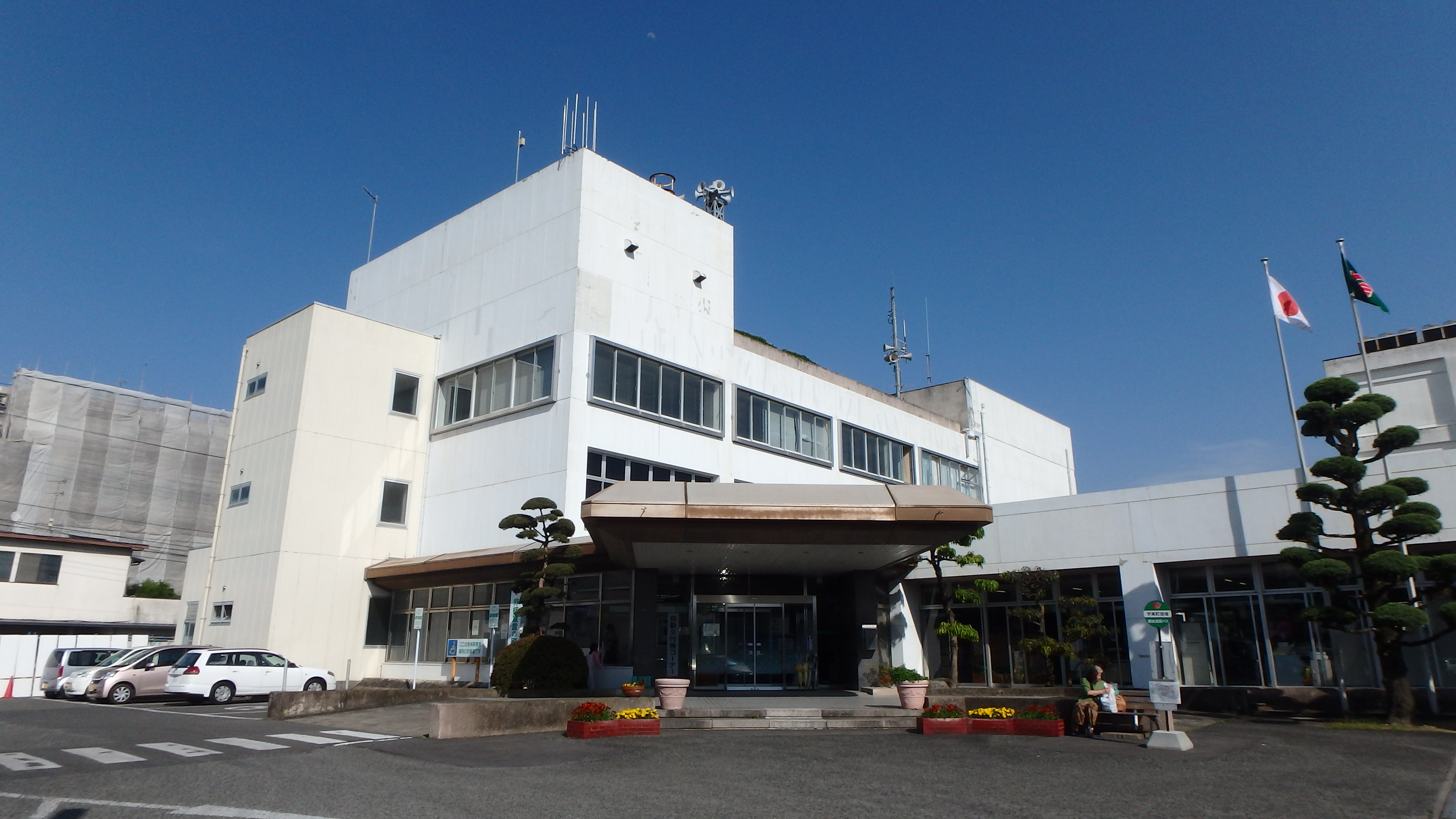
- Umi Town Hall

- Flag Seal
- Location of Umi in Fukuoka Prefecture

- Location in Japan
- Coordinates: 33°34′03″N 130°30′40″E
- Country: Japan
- Region: Kyushu
- Prefecture: Fukuoka
- District: Kasuya

Area
  - Total: 30.21 km^{2} (11.66 sq mi)

Population (March 31, 2024)
  - Total: 36,907
  - Density: 1,222/km^{2} (3,164/sq mi)
- Time zone: UTC+09:00 (JST)
- City hall address: 5-1-1 Umi, Umi-machi, Kasuya-gun, Fukuoka-ken 811-2192
- Website: Official website
- Symbols
- Flower: Rhododendron subg. Hymenanthes
- Tree: Camphora officinarum

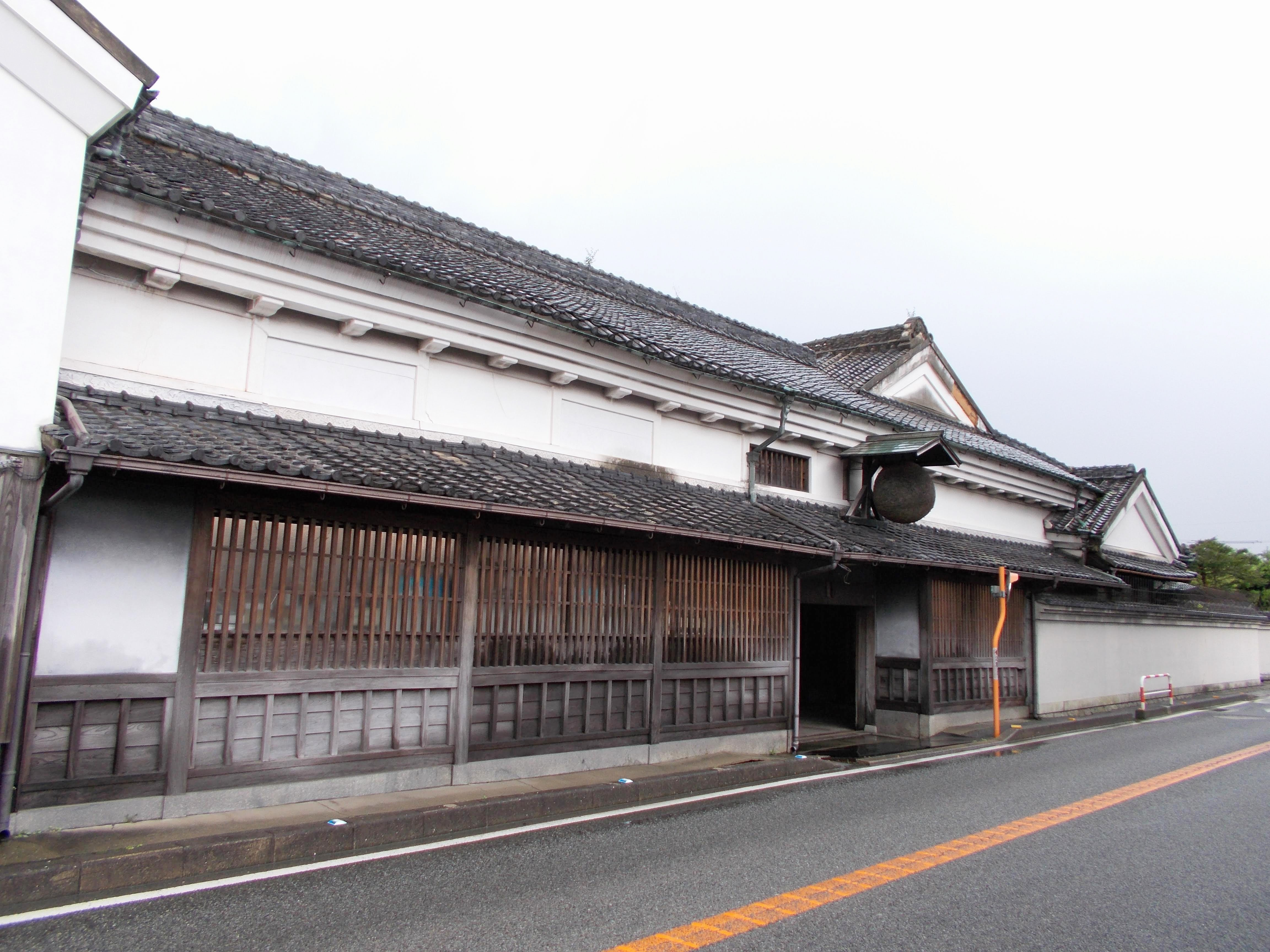
Ban-dai sake is made in Umi

Umi (宇美町, Umi-machi) is a town located in Kasuya District, Fukuoka Prefecture, Japan. As of 31 March 2024, the town had an estimated population of 36,907 in 16691 households, and a population density of 1200 persons per km^{2}. The total area of the town is 30.21 km^{2} (11.66 sq mi)

== Geography ==
Umi is located in northwest Fukuoka Prefecture, approximately 15 kilometers east-southeast of Fukuoka City. It is one of the towns in the Fukuoka metropolitan area, and the flat land in the north and northwest of the town is being developed as a commuter town. The southern and eastern parts of the town are mountainous, and Mount Shioji in the south is especially popular as a hiking course.

=== Neighboring municipalities ===
Fukuoka Prefecture

- Chikushino
- Dazaifu
- Fukuoka
- Iizuka
- Ōnojō
- Shime
- Sue

=== Climate ===
Umi has a humid subtropical climate (Köppen Cfa) characterized by warm summers and cool winters with light to no snowfall. The average annual temperature in Umi is 15.2 °C. The average annual rainfall is 1766 mm with September as the wettest month. The temperatures are highest on average in August, at around 26.5 °C, and lowest in January, at around 4.4 °C.

=== Demographics ===
Per Japanese census data, the population of Umi is as shown below.

Historical population
Year	Pop.	±%
1940	18,461	—
1950	21,972	+19.0%
1960	20,374	−7.3%
1970	19,395	−4.8%
1980	23,966	+23.6%
1990	34,283	+43.0%
2000	38,126	+11.2%
2010	38,617	+1.3%
2020	37,671	−2.4%

== History ==
The area of Umi was part of ancient Chikuzen Province. According to the Nihon Shoki and Kojiki, this is the place where Empress Jingū gave birth to Emperor Ōjin on her way back from the conquest of Korea. During the Edo Period, the area was under the control of Fukuoka Domain. After the Meiji restoration, the village of Umi was established with the creation of the modern municipalities system on April 1, 1889. Umi was elevated to town status on October 20, 1920.

== Government ==
Umi has a mayor-council form of government with a directly elected mayor and a unicameral town council of 14 members. Umi, together with the other municipalities in Kasuya District contributes three members to the Fukuoka Prefectural Assembly. In terms of national politics, the town is part of the Fukuoka 4th district of the lower house of the Diet of Japan.

== Economy ==
In the Meiji period, coal mining formed the basis of the local economy, but the last mines closed in the 1960s. After that, an industrial parks were established; however, the main focus of the local economy is on agriculture, forestry, and tourism, with an increasing percentage of the working population commuting to nearby Fukuoka.

== Education ==
Umi has five public elementary schools and three public junior high schools operated by the town government and one public high school operated by the Fukuoka Prefectural Board of Education.

== Transportation ==
=== Railways ===
JR Kyushu - Kashii Line

JD Umi

=== Highways ===
Umi is not located on any National Highway or Expressway. Although the Kyushu Expressway passes through the town, there is no interchange.

== Local attractions ==
- Kōshōji Kofun, National Historic Site
- Ōno Castle ruins, National Historic Site
- Umi Hachiman-gū
