= Umi-no-Nakamichi Station =

Railway station in Fukuoka, Japan

JD 02 Umi-no-Nakamichi 海ノ中道駅
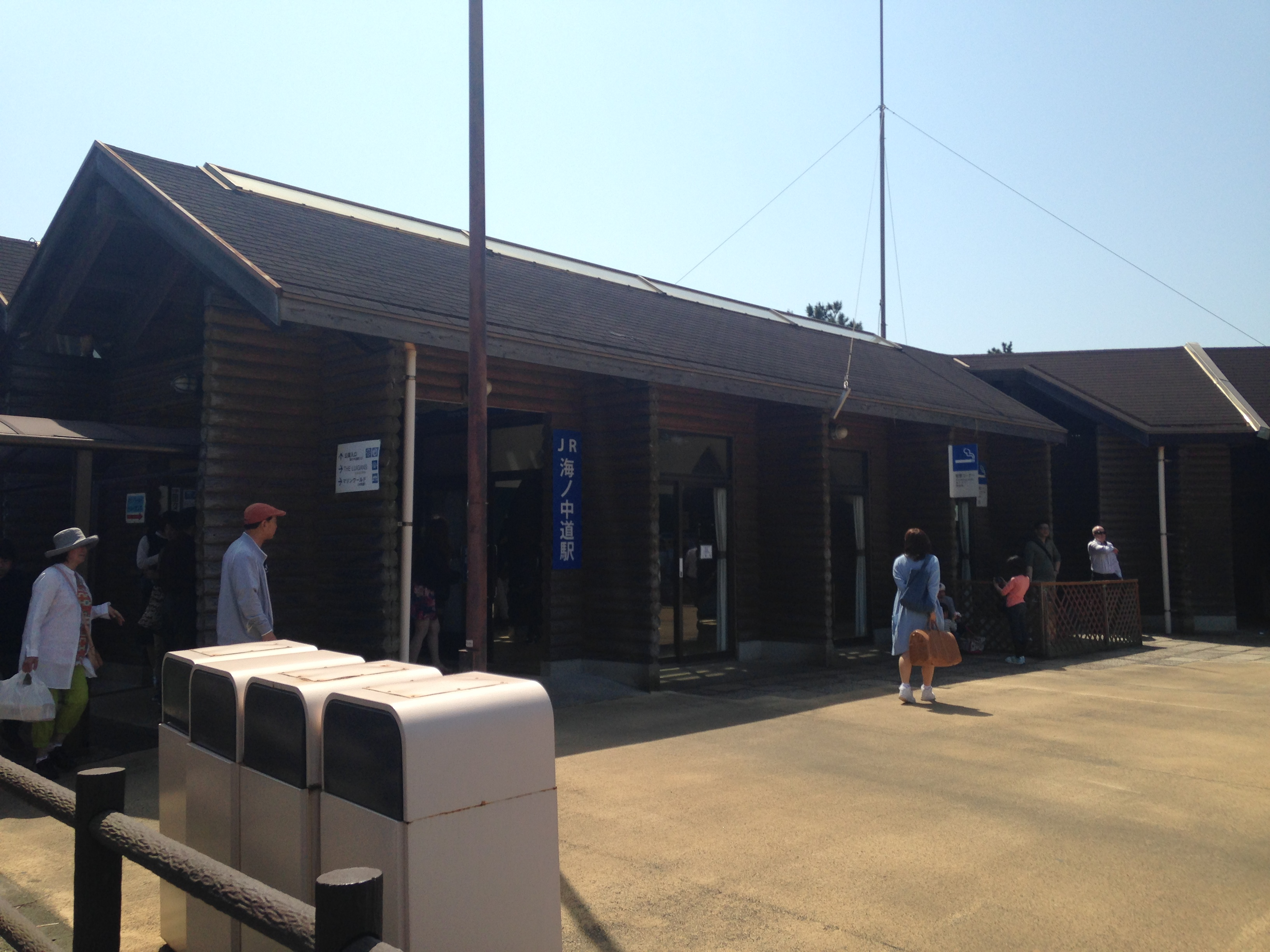
- Umi-no-Nakamichi in 2015

General information
- Location: Saitozaki, Higashi-ku, Fukuoka-shi, Fukuoka-ken 811-0321; Japan
- Coordinates: 33°39′51″N 130°21′42″E
- Operator: JR Kyushu
- Line: JD Kashii Line
- Distance: 2.1 km from Saitozaki
- Platforms: 1 side platform
- Tracks: 1

Construction
- Structure type: At grade

Other information
- Status: Remotely managed station
- Website: Official website

History
- Opened: 1 July 1935

Passengers
- FY2020: 360 daily
- Rank: 253th (among JR Kyushu stations)

Services
Preceding station	JR Kyushu	Following station
Saitozaki Terminus	Kashii Line Local	Gannosu towards Umi
Location
- Location within Fukuoka Prefecture Location within Japan

Umi-no-Nakamichi Station (海ノ中道駅, Umi-no-Nakamichi-eki) is a passenger railway station located in Higashi-ku, Fukuoka, Fukuoka Prefecture, Japan. The station is operated by JR Kyushu.

== Lines ==
The station is served by the Kashii Line and is located 2.1 km from the starting point of the line at Saitozaki.

== Station layout ==
The station, which is unstaffed, consists of a side platform serving a single track at grade. The station building is the right wing of the entrance block of the Umi-no-Nakamichi Seaside Park and houses a waiting room and automatic ticket vending machines.

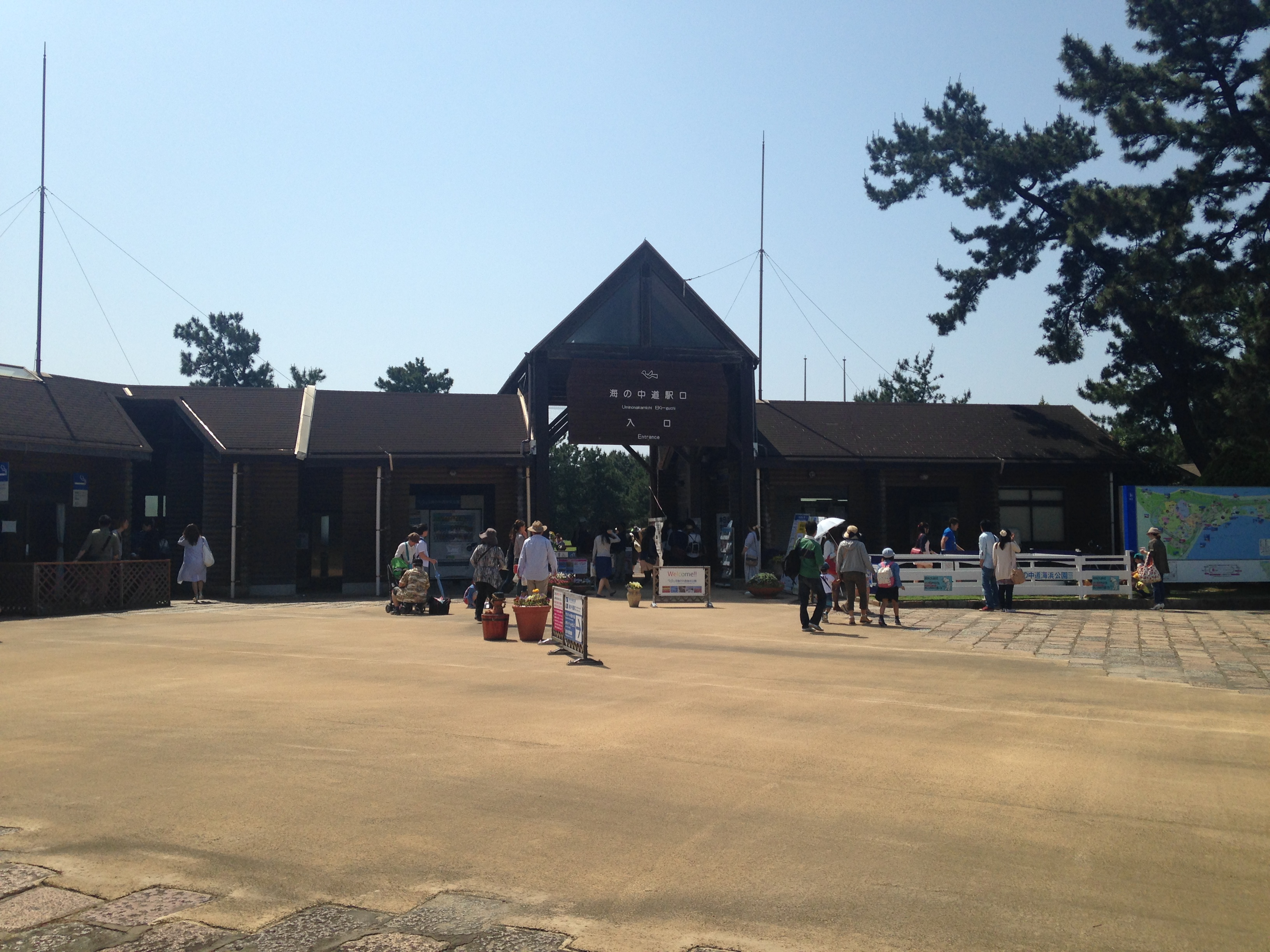
A distant view of the station and Umi-no-Nakamichi Seaside Park entrance. The station building is to the left of the picture.

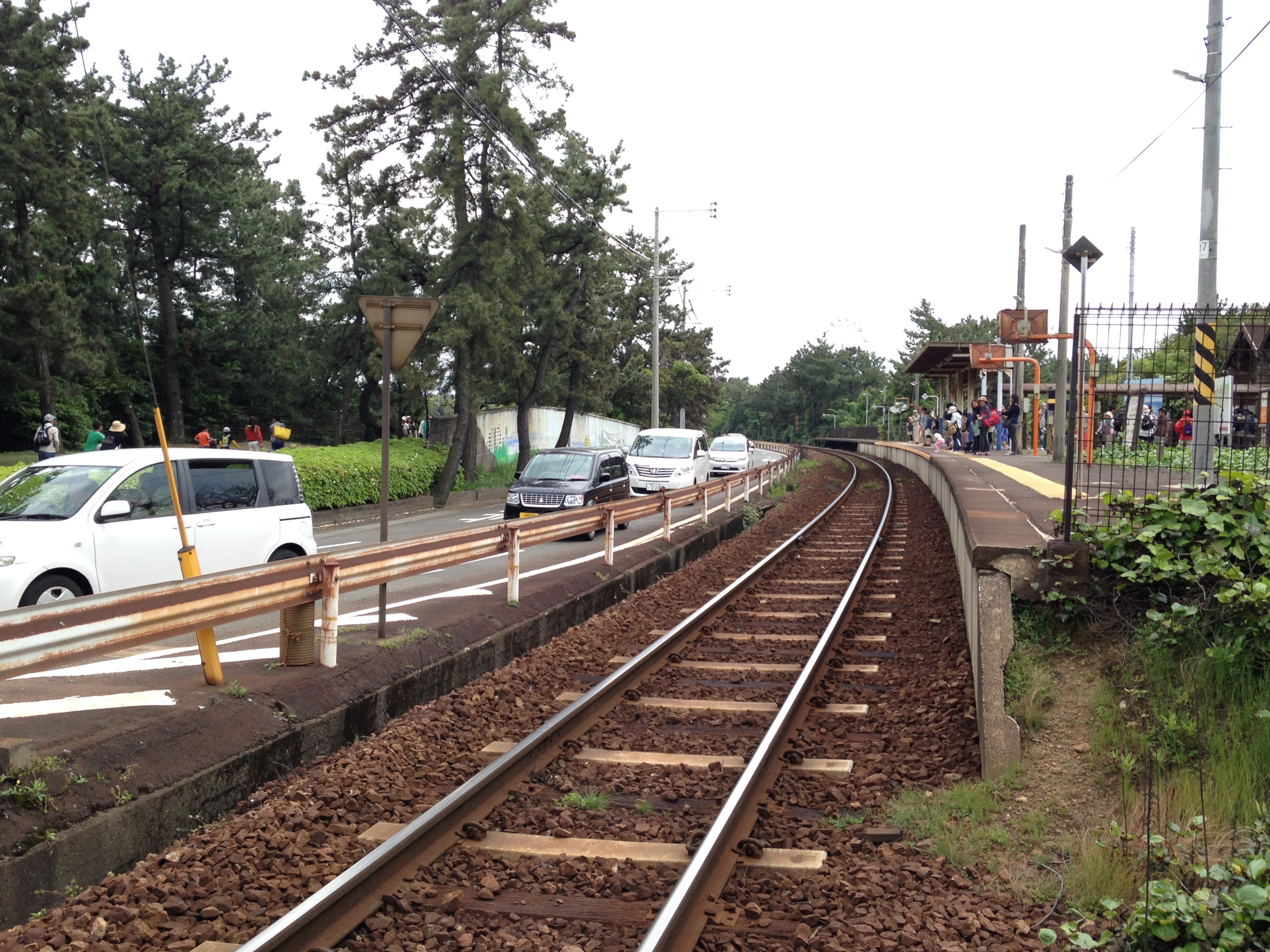
A view of the platform and track.

== History ==
The station was opened on 1 July 1935 by the private Hakata Bay Railway and Steamship Company as a temporary stop its track from Saitozaki to Umi. On 15 July 1941, the stop was upgraded to a full station. On 19 September 1942, the Hakata Bay Railway and Steamship, with a few other companies, merged into the Kyushu Electric Tramway. Three days later, the new conglomerate, which had assumed control of the station, became the Nishi-Nippon Railroad (Nishitetsu). On 1 May 1944, Nishitetsu's track from Saitozaki to Umi was nationalized. Japanese Government Railways (JGR) took over control of the station and designated the track which served as the Kashii Line. On 9 March 1987, Japanese National Railways, the postwar successor of JGR, moved the station further north along the track nearer to the starting point at Saitozaki. The location of the old station became the Nakamichi signal box. With the privatization of JNR on 1 April 1987, JR Kyushu took over control of the station.

On 14 March 2015, the station, along with others on the line, became a remotely managed "Smart Support Station". Under this scheme, passengers using the automatic ticket vending machines or ticket gates could receive assistance via intercom from staff at a central support centre.

== Passenger statistics ==
In fiscal 2020, the station was used by an average of 360 passengers daily (boarding passengers only), and it ranked 253th among the busiest stations of JR Kyushu.

== Surrounding area ==
- National Uminonakamichi Seaside Park

== See also ==
- List of railway stations in Japan
