= Sue, Fukuoka =

Sue 須恵町
- Town
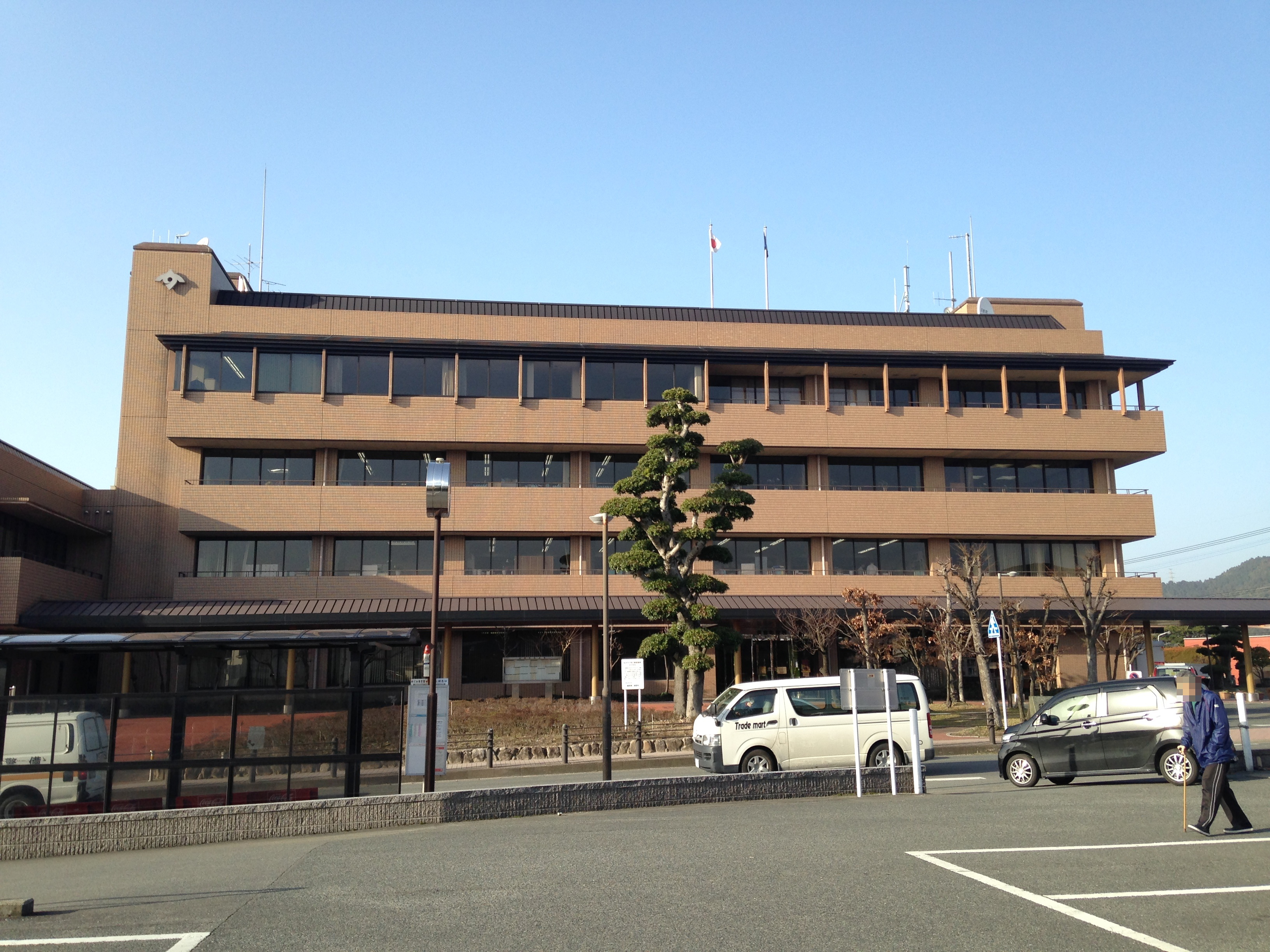
- Sue Town Hall

- Flag Emblem

- Location in Japan
- Coordinates: 33°35′14″N 130°30′26″E
- Country: Japan
- Region: Kyushu
- Prefecture: Fukuoka
- District: Kasuya

Area
  - Total: 16.31 km^{2} (6.30 sq mi)

Population (February 29, 2024)
  - Total: 29,248
  - Density: 1,793/km^{2} (4,645/sq mi)
- Time zone: UTC+09:00 (JST)
- City hall address: 771 Sue, Sue-machi, Kasuya-gun, Fukuoka-ken 811-2193
- Website: Official website
- Symbols
- Bird: Japanese bush warbler
- Flower: Azalea
- Tree: Myrica rubra

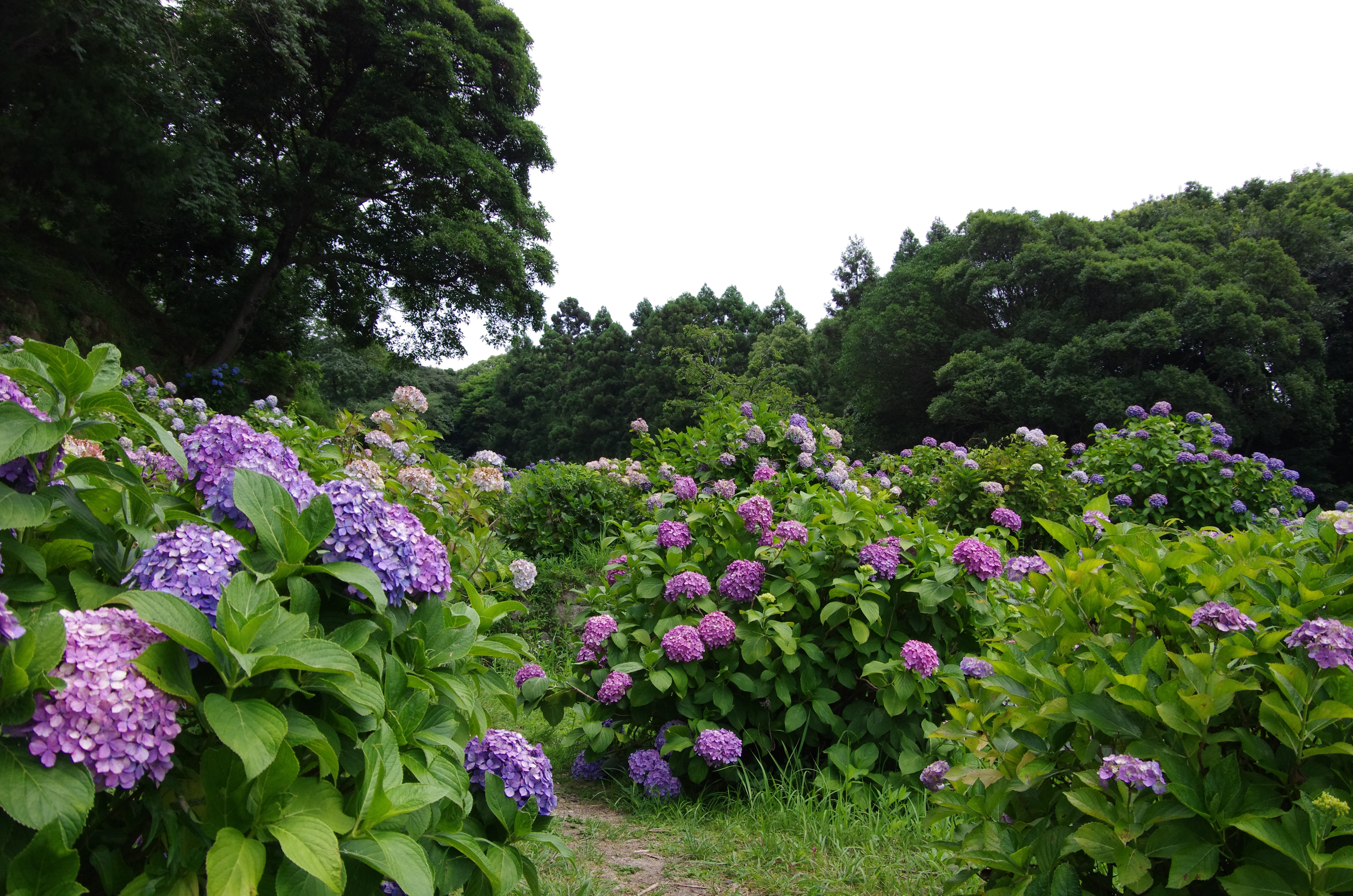
Sarayama Park

Sue (須恵町, Sue-machi) is a town located in Kasuya District, Fukuoka Prefecture, Japan.As of 29 February 2024, the town had an estimated population of 29,248 in 12810 households, and a population density of 1800 persons per km². The total area of the town is 16.31 km^{2} (6.30 sq mi)

== Geography ==
Sue is located slightly northwest of central Fukuoka Prefecture, about 10 kilometers east of Fukuoka City. The Sue River flows from east to west through the center of the town, and Sue Dam is at its source. The eastern part of the town is mountainous. The urban center is in the southwest part of town.

=== Neighboring municipalities ===
Fukuoka Prefecture

- Iizuka
- Kasuya
- Sasaguri
- Shime
- Umi

=== Climate ===
Sue has a humid subtropical climate (Köppen Cfa) characterized by warm summers and cool winters with light to no snowfall. The average annual temperature in Sue is 15.2 °C. The average annual rainfall is 1766 mm with September as the wettest month. The temperatures are highest on average in August, at around 26.5 °C, and lowest in January, at around 4.4 °C.

=== Demographics ===
Per Japanese census data, the population of Sue is as shown below.

Historical population
Year	Pop.	±%
1940	12,248	—
1950	19,423	+58.6%
1960	15,437	−20.5%
1970	12,350	−20.0%
1980	18,546	+50.2%
1990	22,209	+19.8%
2000	25,086	+13.0%
2010	26,047	+3.8%
2020	28,628	+9.9%

== History ==
The area of Sue was part of ancient Chikuzen Province, and was famous from the Kofun perioda s a center for a type of earthenware called Sue ware. During the Edo Period, the area was under the control of Fukuoka Domain. After the Meiji restoration, the village of Sue was established with the creation of the modern municipalities system on April 1, 1889. Sue was raised to town status on April 1, 1953.

== Government ==
Sue has a mayor-council form of government with a directly elected mayor and a unicameral town council of 14 members. Sue, together with the other municipalities in Kasuya District contributes three members to the Fukuoka Prefectural Assembly. In terms of national politics, the town is part of the Fukuoka 4th district of the lower house of the Diet of Japan.

== Economy ==
There used to be a coal mine in the northwestern part of town, but it closed in the 1960s. After that, an industrial park was established; however, the main focus of the local economy is on commerce with an increasing percentage of the working population commuting to nearby Fukuoka.

== Education ==
Sue has three public elementary schools and two public junior high schools operated by the town government, and one public high school operated by the Fukuoka Prefectural Board of Education.

== Transportation ==
=== Railways ===
JR Kyushu - Kashii Line

JD Sue - Sue-Chūō - Shinbaru

=== Highways ===
- Kyushu Expressway

== Notable people from Sue ==
- Hiromi Go, singer, actor
- Tomoyoshi Watanabe, politician
