= Kashii Station =

Railway station in Fukuoka, Japan

JA 04 JD 06 Kashii Station 香椎駅
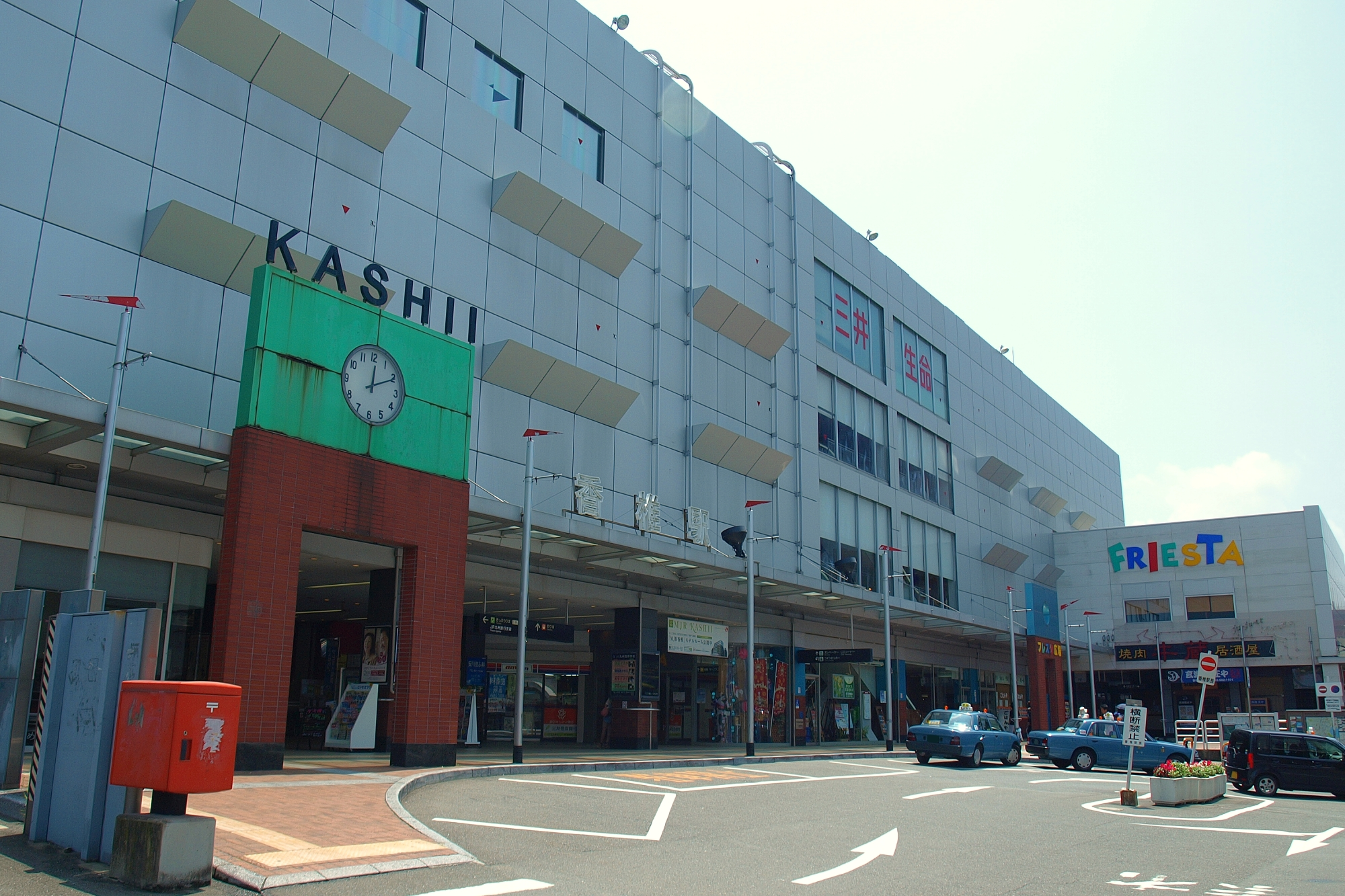
- Kashii Station in 2010

General information
- Location: 11-1 Kashii-Ekimae 1-chōme, Higashi-ku, Fukuoka-shi, Fukuoka-ken; Japan
- Coordinates: 33°39′33″N 130°26′38″E
- Operator: JR Kyushu
- Lines: JA Kagoshima Main Line; JD Kashii Line
- Distance: 69.8 km (43.4 mi) from Mojikō (Kagoshima Main Line); 12.9 km (8.0 mi) from Saitozaki (Kashii Line)
- Platforms: 1 side + 2 island platforms
- Tracks: 5 + 2 passing loops and numerous sidings

Construction
- Structure type: At grade

Other information
- Station code: JA04; JD06
- Website: Official website

History
- Opened: 28 September 1890; 136 years ago

Passengers
- FY2021: 11,321 daily
- Rank: 10th (among JR Kyushu stations)

Services
Preceding station	JR Kyushu	Following station
Chihaya JA 03 towards Kagoshima	Kagoshima Main Line Rapid Semi rapid	Fukkōdai-mae JA 06 towards Mojikō
Chihaya JA 03 towards Kagoshima	Kagoshima Main Line Local	Kyūsandai-mae JA 05 towards Mojikō
Wajiro JD 05 towards Saitozaki	Kashii Line Local	Kashii-Jingū JD 07 towards Umi
Location
- Location within Fukuoka Prefecture Location within Japan

Kashii Station (香椎駅, Kashii-eki) is a junction passenger train station located in Higashi-ku, Fukuoka, Fukuoka City, Fukuoka Prefecture, Japan. It is operated by JR Kyushu.

== Lines ==
The station is served by the Kagoshima Main Line and is located 69.8 km from the starting point of the line at Mojikō.

The station is also served by the Kashii Line and is located 12.9 km from the starting point of the line at Saitozaki.

== Layout ==
The station consists of a side platform and two island platforms serving five tracks. The platforms are connected by overpasses, and all platforms are equipped with elevators and escalators. The station has a Midori no Madoguchi staffed ticket office.

=== Platforms ===
1	■ Limited Express Sonic, Nichirin	for Kokura, Yanagigaura, Ōita, Saiki, and Miyazaki
1	■ Kagoshima Main Line	for Orio, Kokura, and Mojikō
1	■ Kashii Line	for Umi-no-Nakamichi and Saitozaki
2	■ Limited Express Sonic, Nichirin, Kirameki	for Hakata
2	■ Kagoshima Main Line	for Hakata, Futsukaichi, Tosu, Kurume, and Ōmuta
3	■ Kagoshima Main Line	for Hakata, Futsukaichi, Tosu, Kurume and Ōmuta
3	■ Kashii Line	for Umi-no-Nakamichi, Saitozaki, Chōjabaru and Umi
4	■ Kashii Line	for Umi-no-Nakamichi, Saitozaki, Chōjabaru, and Umi
5	■ Kashii Line	for Umi-no-Nakamichi, Saitozaki, Chōjabaru, and Umi|}

== History ==
The privately run Kyushu Railway had begun laying down its network on Kyushu in 1889 and by 1890 had a stretch of track from Hakata southwards to Kurume. The track was extended northwards from Hakata to Akama by 28 September 1890, with Kashii being opened on the same day as one of the intermediate stations. On 1 January 1904, the Hakata Bay Railway opened a line between Saitozaki and Sue, connecting to Kashii as one of the intermediate stops. The Kyushu Railway was nationalized on 1 July 1907, Japanese Government Railways (JGR) took over control of the station. On 12 October 1909, the station became part of the Hitoyoshi Main Line and then on 21 November 1909, part of the Kagoshima Main Line. In 1942, the Hakata Railway, now renamed the Hakata Railway and Steamship Company merged with other companies, becoming the Nishi Nippon Railroad (Nishitetsu). On 1 May 1944, Nishitetsu's line from Saitozaki to Sue and its later extensions to Shinbaru and Umi were also nationalized and became designated as the Kashii Line. With the privatization of Japanese National Railways (JNR), the successor of JGR, on 1 April 1987, JR Kyushu took over control of the station.

== Passenger statistics ==
In fiscal 2020, the station was used by an average of 10,494 passengers daily (boarding passengers only), and it ranked 8th among the busiest stations of JR Kyushu.

== Surrounding area ==
The station is positioned as the eastern sub-center of Fukuoka City, and the area around the station is a small downtown area.

- Fukuoka Women's University
- Fukuoka Prefectural Kashii High School
- Fukuoka Prefectural Kashii Technical High School
- Kyushu Sangyo University Kyushu High School

== See also ==
- List of railway stations in Japan
