= Kashii Line =

Railway line in Fukuoka Prefecture, Japan

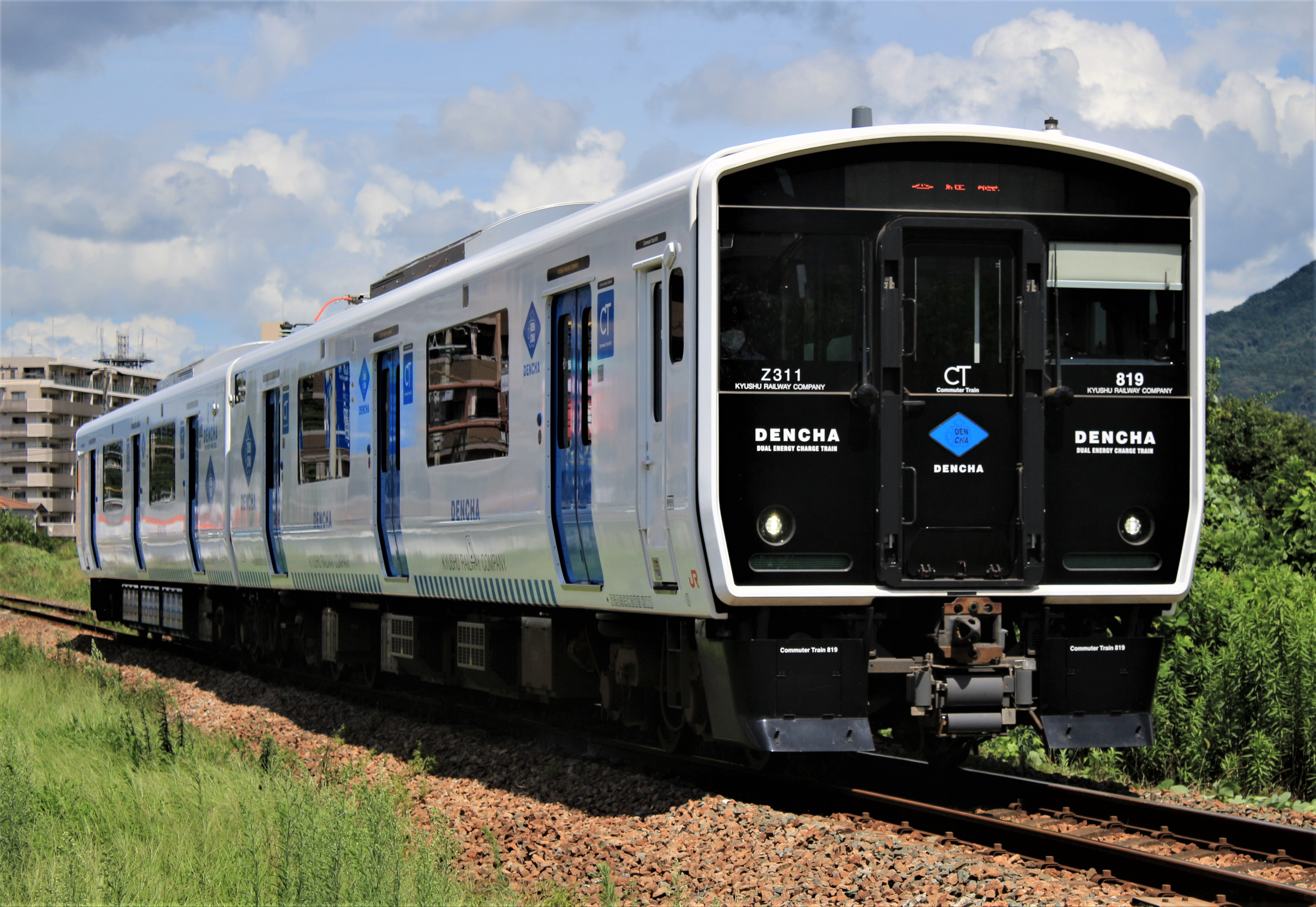
- BEC819 series at Kashii Line

Overview
- Status: In operation
- Owner: JR Kyushu
- Locale: Fukuoka Prefecture
- Termini: Saitozaki; Umi
- Stations: 16

Service
- Type: Heavy rail
- Operator(s): JR Kyushu
- Rolling stock: BEC819 series

History
- Opened: 1 January 1904; 121 years ago

Technical
- Line length: 25.4 km (15.8 mi)
- Number of tracks: Single
- Character: Fairly urban with a few rural sections
- Track gauge: 1,067 mm (3 ft 6 in)
- Electrification: None
- Operating speed: 85 km/h (53 mph)
Route map

The Kashii Line (香椎線, Kashii-sen) is a railway line in Japan operated by Kyushu Railway Company (JR Kyushu). It connects Saitozaki Station in Fukuoka with Umi Station in Umi.

== Stations ==
No.	Station		Distance (km)	Transfers	Location	
JD 01	Saitozaki	西戸崎	0.0		Higashi-ku, Fukuoka	Fukuoka Prefecture
JD 02	Umi-no-Nakamichi	海ノ中道	2.1		Higashi-ku, Fukuoka	Fukuoka Prefecture
JD 03	Gannosu	雁ノ巣	6.5		Higashi-ku, Fukuoka	Fukuoka Prefecture
JD 04	Nata	奈多	7.4		Higashi-ku, Fukuoka	Fukuoka Prefecture
JD 05	Wajiro	和白	9.2	Nishitetsu Kaizuka Line	Higashi-ku, Fukuoka	Fukuoka Prefecture
JD 06	Kashii	香椎	12.9	Kagoshima Main Line; Nishitetsu Kaizuka Line (Nishitetsu Kashii)	Higashi-ku, Fukuoka	Fukuoka Prefecture
JD 07	Kashii Jingū	香椎神宮	14.2		Higashi-ku, Fukuoka	Fukuoka Prefecture
JD 08	Maimatsubara	舞松原	14.8		Higashi-ku, Fukuoka	Fukuoka Prefecture
JD 09	Doi	土井	16.4		Higashi-ku, Fukuoka	Fukuoka Prefecture
JD 10	Iga	伊賀	18.2		Kasuya	Fukuoka Prefecture
JD 11	Chōjabaru	長者原	19.2	Sasaguri Line (Fukuhoku Yutaka Line)	Kasuya	Fukuoka Prefecture
JD 12	Sakado	酒殿	20.6		Kasuya	Fukuoka Prefecture
JD 13	Sue	須恵	21.9		Sue	Fukuoka Prefecture
JD 14	Sue-Chūō	須恵中央	23.1		Sue	Fukuoka Prefecture
JD 15	Shinbaru	新原	24.1		Sue	Fukuoka Prefecture
JD 16	Umi	宇美	25.4		Umi	Fukuoka Prefecture

== History ==
The Hakata Bay Railway Co. opened the Saitozaki - Sue section in 1904, extending it to the Otani coal mine (1 km beyond Umi) the following year. In 1942, the company merged with the Nishi-Nippon Railroad company, which was nationalised in 1944.

The line beyond Umi closed in 1980.

=== Former connecting lines ===
Sakado station - The 14 km Katsuta line was opened by the Chikuzen Sangu Railway Co. from Yusu (on the Sasaguri Line) - Chikuzenkatsuta in 1918–19. The connection to Sakado opened in 1942, and the line was nationalised in 1944. Freight service ceased in 1981, and the line closed in 1985.
