= Sue Station (Fukuoka) =

Railway station in Sue, Fukuoka Prefecture, Japan

JD 13 Sue Station 須恵駅
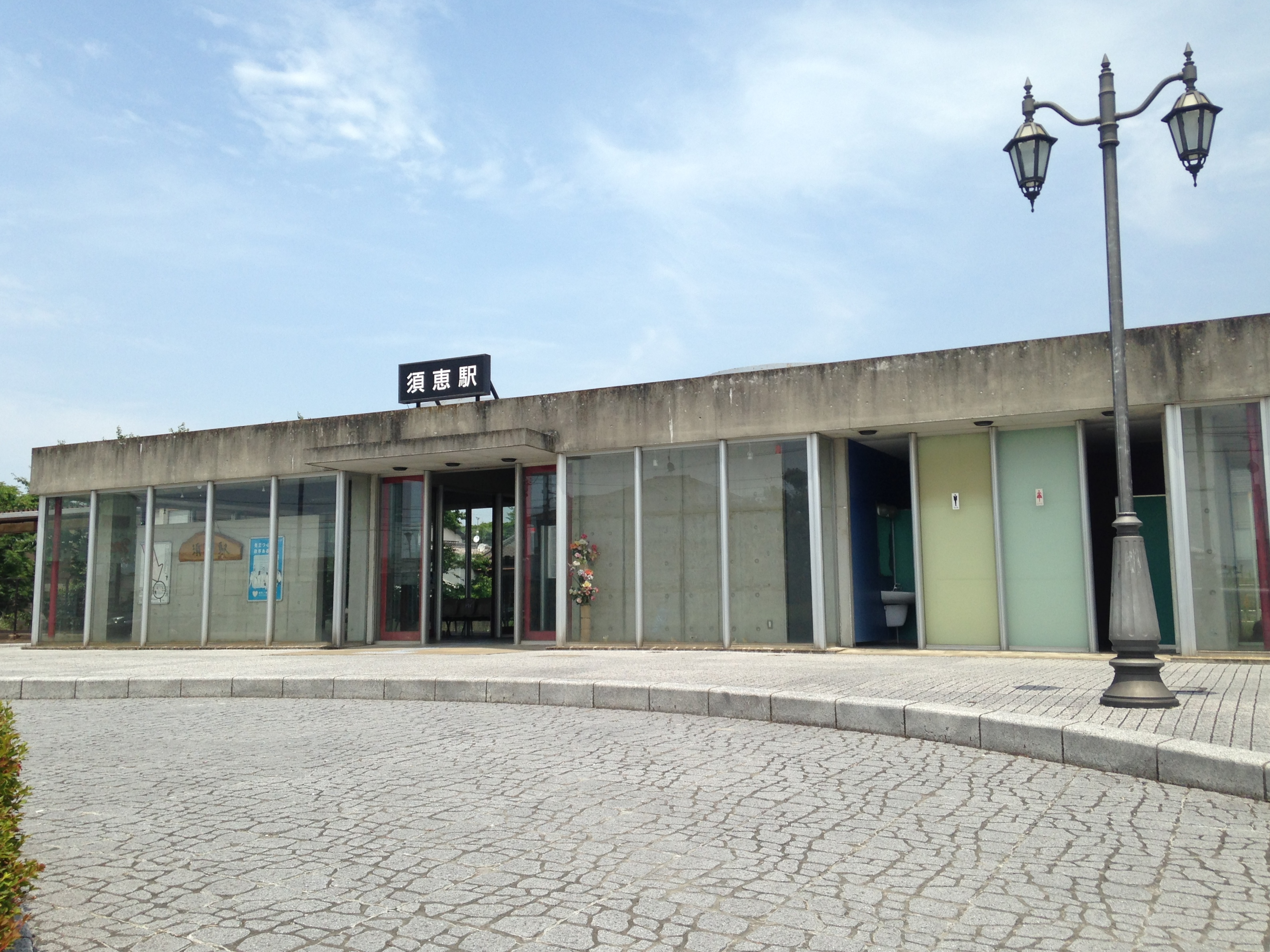
- Sue Station in 2016

General information
- Location: Ueki, Sue-machi, Kasuya-gun, Fukuoka-ken 811-2112; Japan
- Coordinates: 33°35′48″N 130°29′54″E
- Operator: JR Kyushu
- Line: JD Kashii Line
- Distance: 21.9 km from Saitozaki
- Platforms: 1 side platform
- Tracks: 1

Construction
- Structure type: At grade

Other information
- Status: Remotely managed station
- Website: Official website

History
- Opened: 1 January 1904

Passengers
- FY2020: 547 daily
- Rank: 204th (among JR Kyushu stations)

Services
Preceding station	JR Kyushu	Following station
Sakado towards Saitozaki	Kashii Line Local	Sue-Chūō towards Umi
Location
- Location within Fukuoka Prefecture Location within Japan

Sue Station (須恵駅, Sue-eki)is a passenger railway station located in the town of Sue, Fukuoka Prefecture, Japan. It is operated by JR Kyushu.

== Lines ==
The station is served by the Kashii Line and is located 21.9 km from the starting point of the line at Saitozaki.

== Station layout ==
The station, which is unstaffed, consists of a side platform serving a single track. The station building is a modern structure of glass and steel frames and houses a small waiting area and automatic ticket machines.

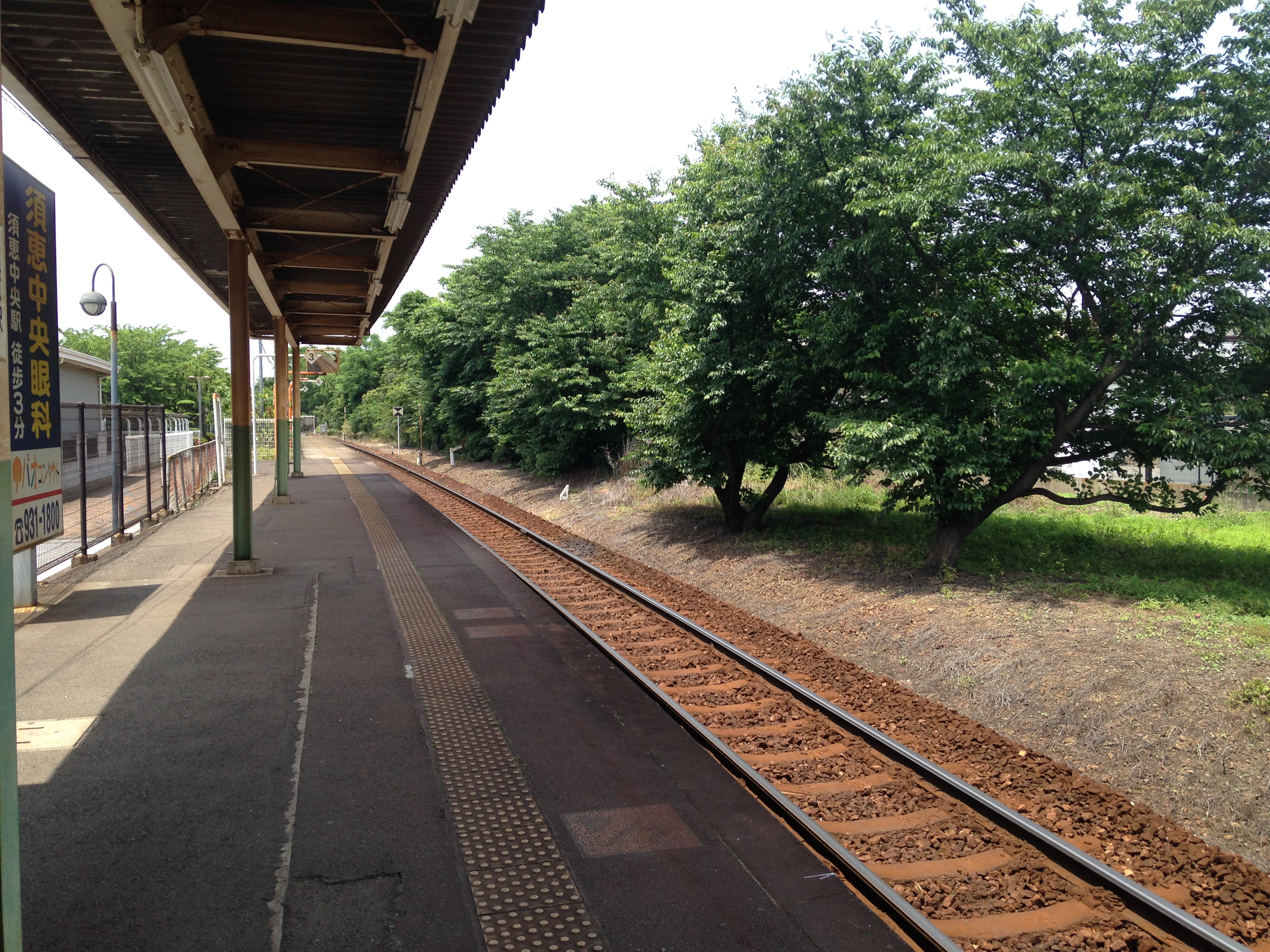
A view of the station platform and track.

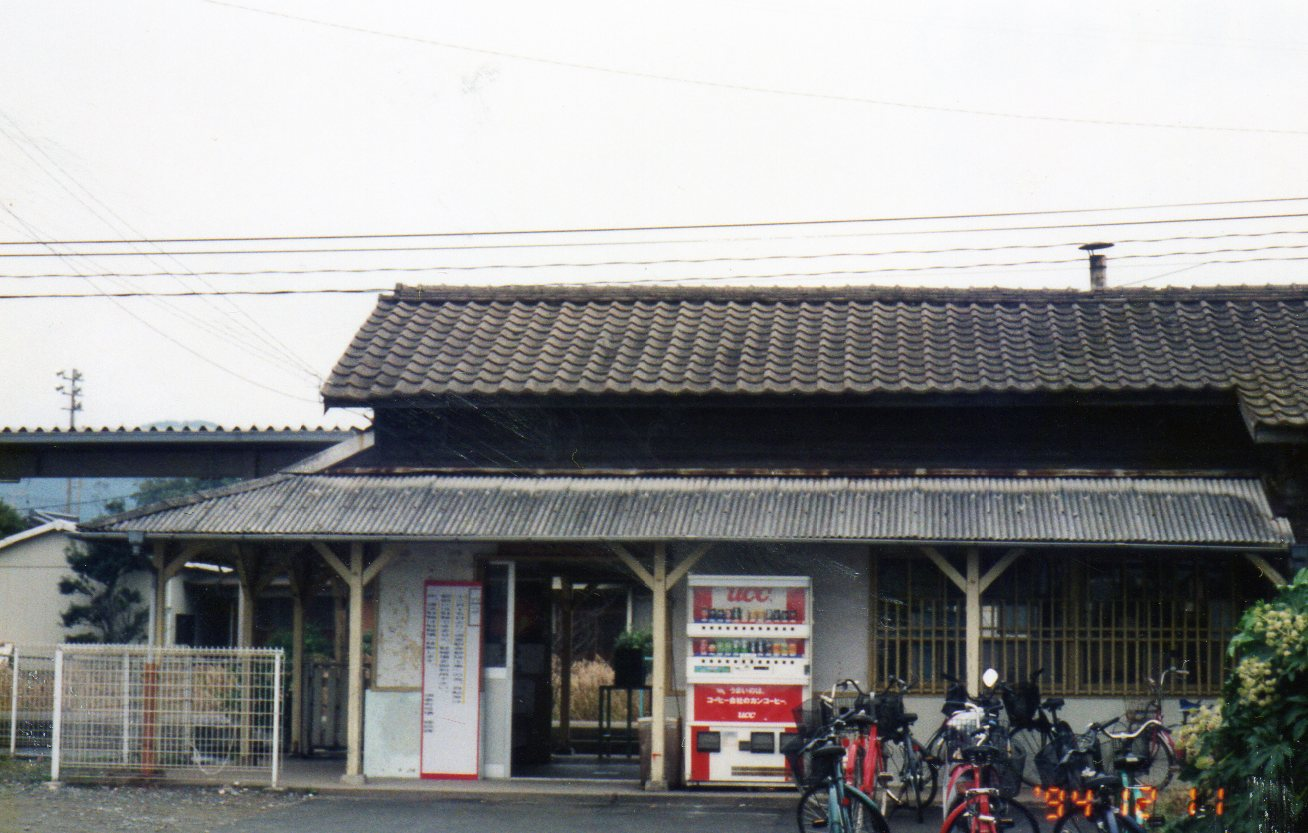
The old station building.

== History ==
The station was opened on 1 January 1904 by the private Hakata Bay Railway as the southern terminus of a stretch of track from Saitozaki. Sue became a through-station on 3 June 1905 when the track was further extended to Shinbaru. On 19 September 1942, the company, now renamed the Hakata Bay Railway and Steamship Company, with a few other companies, merged into the Kyushu Electric Tramway. Three days later, the new conglomerate, which had assumed control of the station, became the Nishi-Nippon Railroad (Nishitetsu). On 1 May 1944, Nishitetsu's track from Saitozaki to Sue and the later extensions to Shinbaru and Umi were nationalized. Japanese Government Railways (JGR) took over control of the station and the track which served it was designated the Kashii Line. With the privatization of Japanese National Railways (JNR), the successor of JGR, on 1 April 1987, JR Kyushu took over control of the station.

On 14 March 2015, the station, along with others on the line, became a remotely managed "Smart Support Station". Under this scheme, although the station became unstaffed, passengers using the automatic ticket vending machines or ticket gates could receive assistance via intercom from staff at a central support centre.

== Passenger statistics ==
In fiscal 2020, there was a daily average of 547 boarding passengers at this station, making it the 204th busiest station on the JR Kyushu network.。

== Surrounding area ==
Fukuoka Prefectural Route 91 runs parallel to the Kashii Line in front of the station. The area around the station is far from the center of Sue Town, and is a residential area and farmland.

- Sue Town Sue Daini Elementary School

== See also ==
- List of railway stations in Japan
