= Saitozaki Station =

Railway station in Fukuoka, Japan

JD 01 Saitozaki Station 西戸崎駅
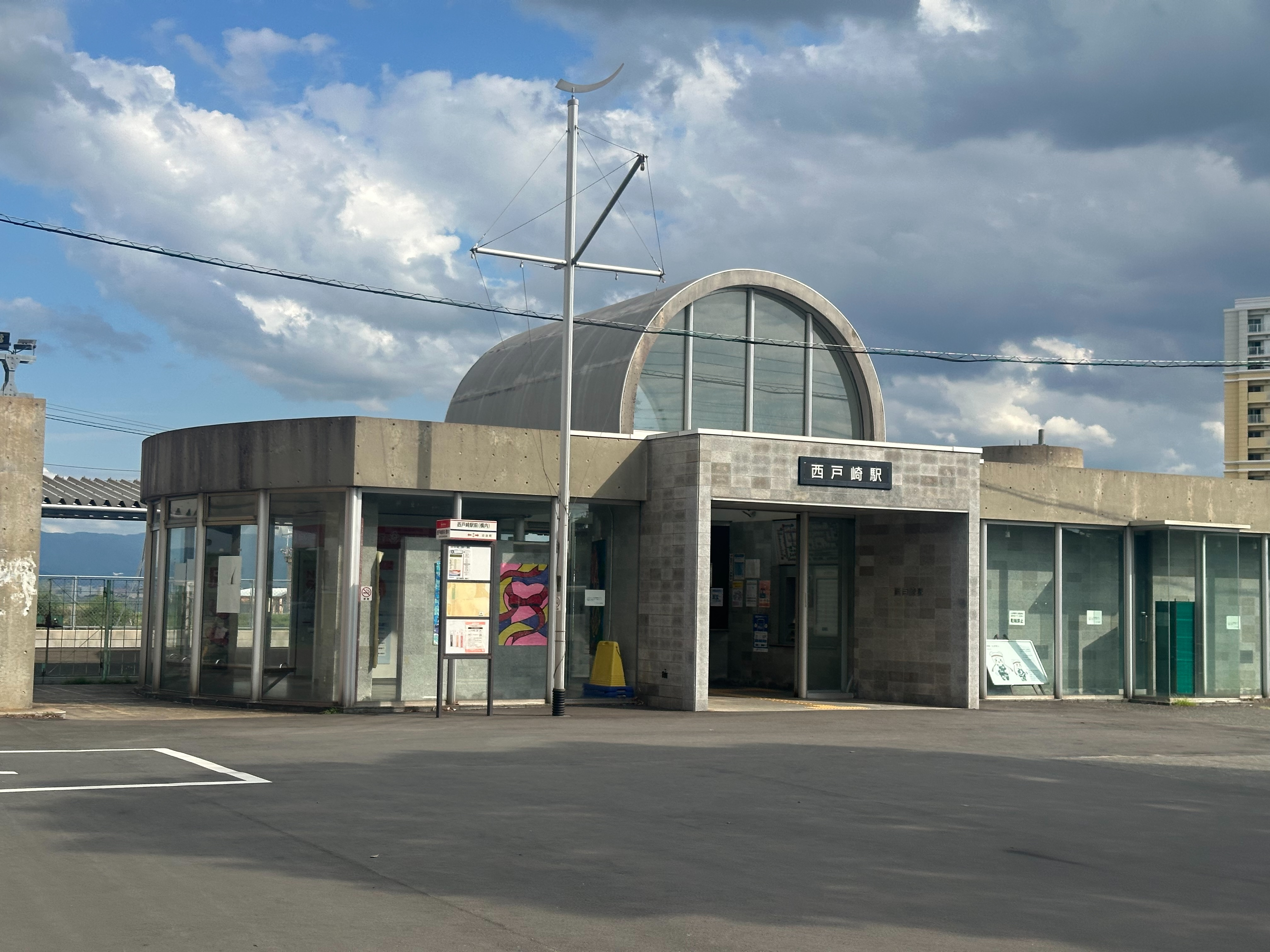
- Saitozaki Station in 2024

General information
- Location: 1-chōme-1 Saitozaki, Higashi-ku, Fukuoka-shi, Fukuoka-ken 811-0321; Japan
- Coordinates: 33°39′0.85″N 130°21′28.17″E
- Operator: JR Kyushu
- Line: JD Kashii Line
- Distance: 0.0 km (starting point of the line)
- Platforms: 2 side platforms
- Tracks: 2 + 1 siding

Construction
- Structure type: At grade

Other information
- Status: Remotely managed station
- Website: Official website

History
- Opened: 1 January 1904

Passengers
- FY2020: 646 daily
- Rank: 193rd (among JR Kyushu stations)

Services
Preceding station	JR Kyushu	Following station
Terminus	Kashii Line Local	Uminonakamichi towards Umi
Location
- Location within Fukuoka Prefecture Location within Japan

Saitozaki Station (西戸崎駅, Saitozaki-eki) is a passenger railway station located in Higashi-ku, Fukuoka, Fukuoka Prefecture, Japan. It is operated by JR Kyushu

== Lines ==
The station is the northern terminus of the 25.4 kilometer Kashii Line to Umi.

== Station layout ==
The station, which is unstaffed, consists of a bay platform and a side platform serving two tracks. The station building, a modern concrete and glass structure, houses as a waiting room and automatic ticket vending machines. Platform 1 is linked to the station building. Platform 2 is accessed by means of a level crossing near the end of the track.

=== Platforms ===
1, 2, 3	■ JD Kashii Line	for Kashii and Umi

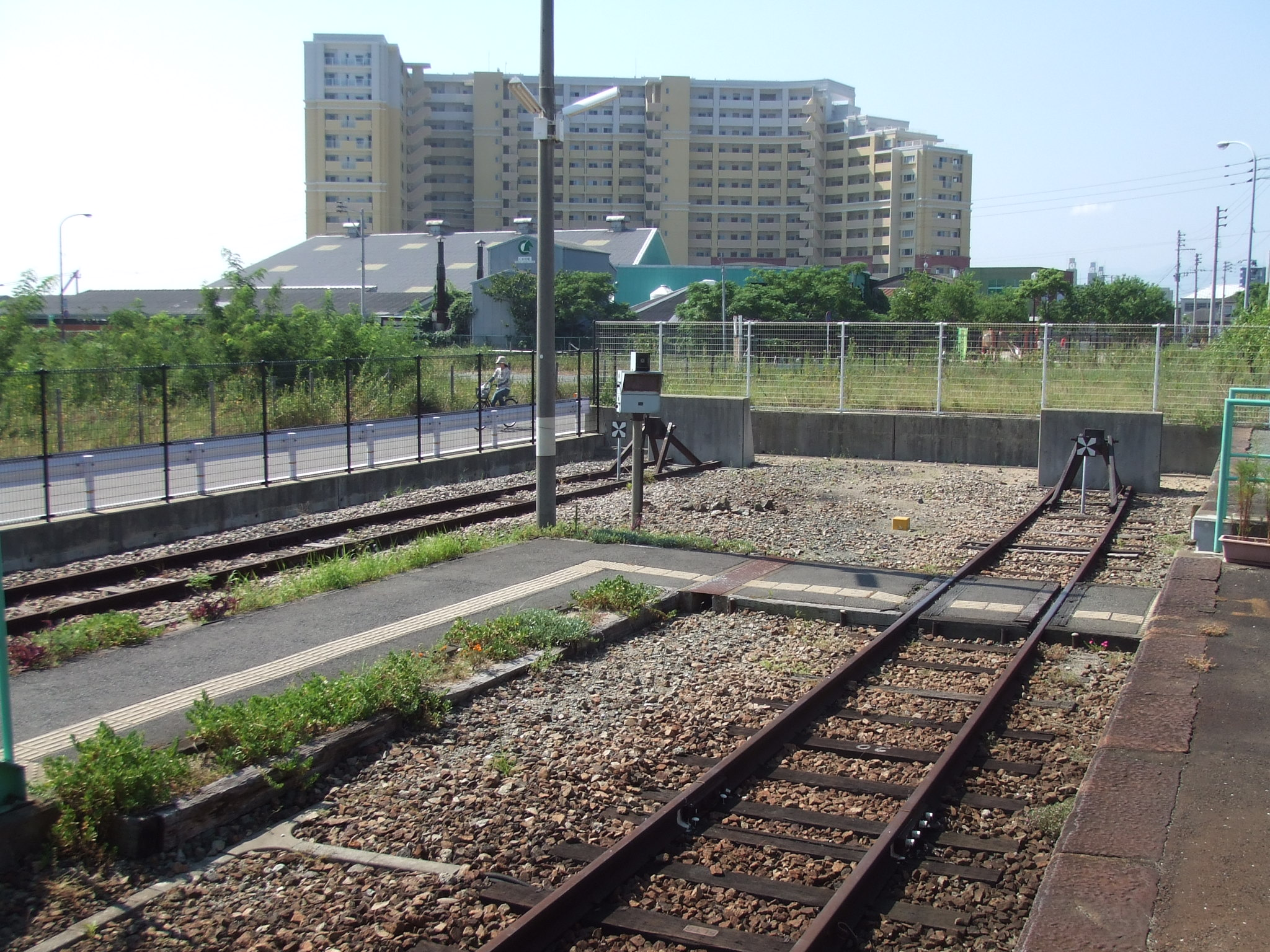
A view of the end of the tracks, with the level crossing.

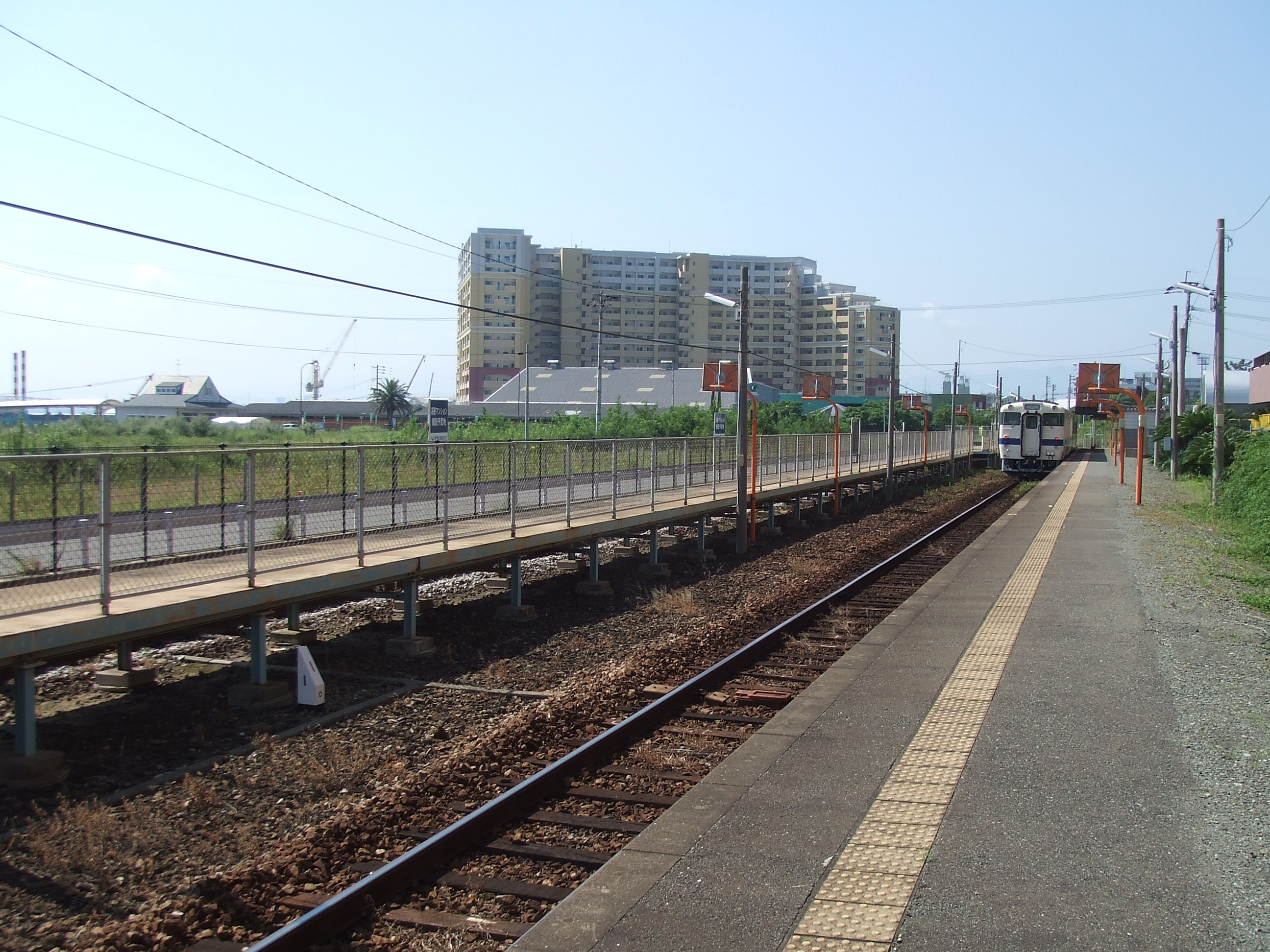
A view of the platforms and tracks.

== History ==
The station was opened on 1 January 1904 by the private Hakata Bay Railway as the northern terminus of a stretch of track to Sue. On 19 September 1942, the company, now renamed the Hakata Bay Railway and Steamship Company, with a few other companies, merged into the Kyushu Electric Tramway. Three days later, the new conglomerate, which assumed control of the station, became the Nishi-Nippon Railroad (Nishitetsu). On 1 May 1944, Nishitetsu's track from Saitozaki to Sue and the later extension to Umi was nationalized. Japanese Government Railways (JGR) which took over control of the station and the track which served it was designated the Kashii Line. With the privatization of Japanese National Railways (JNR), the successor of JGR, on 1 April 1987, JR Kyushu took over control of the station.

On 14 March 2015, the station, along with others on the line, became a remotely managed "Smart Support Station". Under this scheme, although the station became unstaffed, passengers using the automatic ticket vending machines or ticket gates could receive assistance via intercom from staff at a central support centre.

== Passenger statistics ==
In fiscal 2020, the station was used by an average of 646 passengers daily (boarding passengers only), and it ranked 193rd among the busiest stations of JR Kyushu.

== Surrounding area ==
- Fukuoka Municipal Ferry/Nishitosaki Passenger Waiting Area
- Uminonakamichi Seaside Park

== See also ==
- List of railway stations in Japan
