= Umi Station =

Railway station in Umi, Fukuoka Prefecture, Japan

JD 16 Umi Station 宇美駅
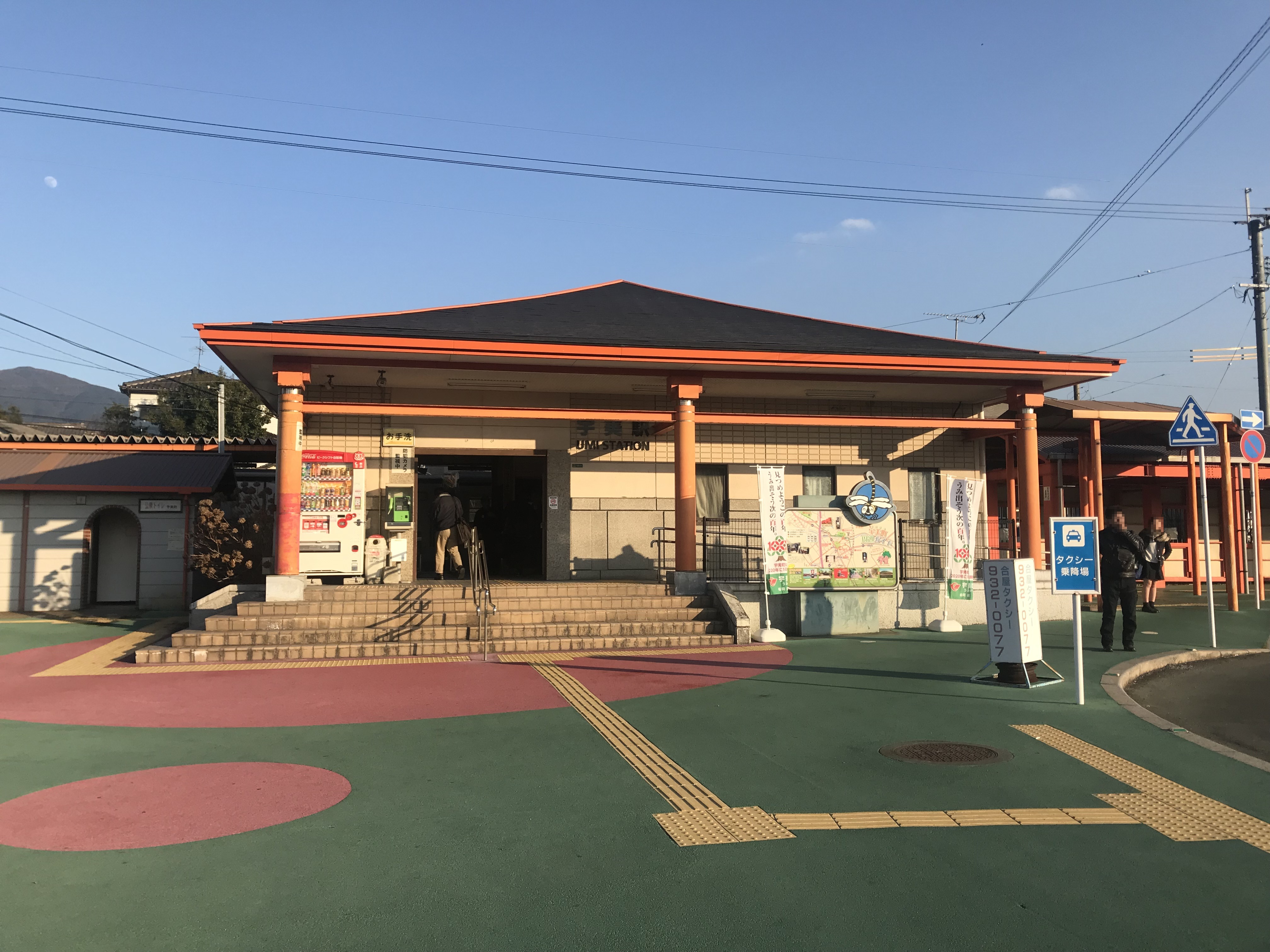
- Umi Station in 2019

General information
- Location: 5-13-1 Umi, Umi-machi, Kasuya-gun, Fukuoka-ken 811-2101; Japan
- Coordinates: 33°34′8.59″N 130°30′47.70″E
- Operator: JR Kyushu
- Line: JD Kashii Line
- Platforms: 1 side platform

Other information
- Status: Unstaffed
- Website: Official website

History
- Opened: 29 December 1905

Passengers
- FY2020: 1529 daily
- Rank: 94th (among JR Kyushu stations)

Services
Preceding station	JR Kyushu	Following station
Shinbaru towards Saitozaki	Kashii Line Local	Terminus
Location
- Location within Fukuoka Prefecture Location within Japan

Umi Station (宇美駅, Umi-eki) is a passenger railway station located in the town of Umi, Fukuoka Prefecture, Japan. It is operated by JR Kyushu.

== Lines ==
The station is the southern terminus of the Kashii Line and is located 25.4 km from the opposing terminus of the line at Saitozaki.

== Station layout ==
The station, which is unstaffed, consists of side platform serving a single track, with station building modeled after the shape of a torii gate, along the lines of Umi Hachiman-gū Shrine..

== History ==
The private Hakata Bay Railway had opened a track on 1 January 1904 from Saitozaki to its southern terminus at Sue and extended by 3 June 1905 to Shinbaru. The track was further extended and Umi opened as the new southern terminus on 29 December 1905. On 19 September 1942, the company, now renamed the Hakata Bay Railway and Steamship Company, with a few other companies, merged into the Kyushu Electric Tramway. Three days later, the new conglomerate, which had assumed control of the station, became the Nishi-Nippon Railroad (Nishitetsu). On 1 May 1944, Nishitetsu's track from Saitozaki to Umi were nationalized. Japanese Government Railways (JGR) took over control of the station and the track which served it was designated the Kashii Line. With the privatization of Japanese National Railways (JNR), the successor of JGR, on 1 April 1987, JR Kyushu took over control of the station.

== Passenger statistics ==
In fiscal 2020, there was a daily average of 1529 boarding passengers at this station, making it the 94th busiest station on the JR Kyushu network.。

== Surrounding area ==
- Umi Town Hall
- Umi Hachiman-gū
- Umi Town History Museum
- Fukuoka Prefectural Umi Commercial High School

== See also ==
- List of railway stations in Japan
