= Tōnoharu Station =

Railway station in Fukuoka, Japan

Tōnoharu Station 唐の原駅
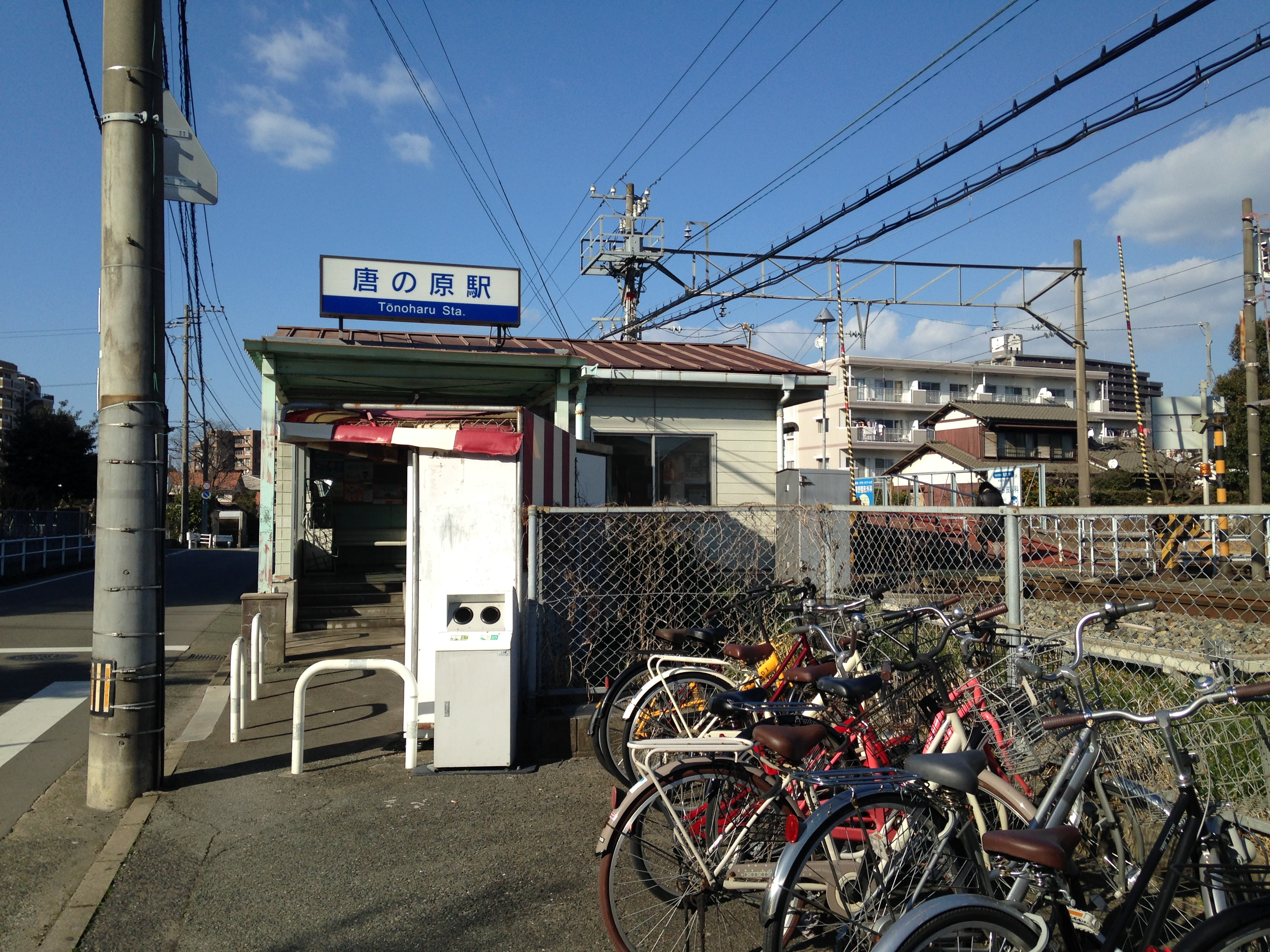
- Tōnoharu Station

General information
- Location: 4-chome Wajiro, Higashi-ku, Fukuoka-shi, Fukuoka-ken; Japan
- Coordinates: 33°40′48.2″N 130°26′4.2″E
- Operator: Nishi-Nippon Railroad
- Line: ■ Nishitetsu Kaizuka Line
- Distance: 6.1 km from Kaizuka
- Platforms: 1 island platform

Other information
- Station code: NK07
- Website: Official website

History
- Opened: 1 November 1986

Passengers
- FY2022: 1250

Services
Preceding station	Nishitetsu	Following station
Kashii-Kaenmae towards Kaizuka	Kaizuka Line	Wajiro towards Nishitetsu Shingū
Location
- Location within Fukuoka Prefecture Location within Japan

Tōnoharu Station (唐の原駅, Tōnoharu-eki) is a passenger railway station located in Higashi-ku, Fukuoka Fukuoka Prefecture, Japan. It is operated by the private transportation company Nishi-Nippon Railroad (NNR), and has station number NK07.

== Lines ==
The station is served by the Nishitetsu Kaizuka Line and is 6.1 kilometers from the terminus of the line at Kaizuka.

== Station layout ==
The station consists of one ground-level island platform connected to the station building by a level crossing.

== Platforms ==
1	■ Nishitetsu Kaizuka Line	for Wajiro and Nishitetsu Shingū
2	■ Nishitetsu Kaizuka Line	for Nishitetsu Kashii, Chihaya and Kaizuka

== History ==
The station opened on 1 November 1986.

== Passenger statistics ==
In fiscal 2022, the station was used by 1205 passengers daily.

== Surrounding area ==
The surrounding area on the station building side (west side of the station) is a residential area, and to the west of the residential area is Wajiro Tidal Flat. The opposite side of the station building (to the east of the station) is also a residential area. Beyond the residential area, Japan National Route 495 runs parallel to the Kaizuka Line about 300 meters east of the station, and many roadside stores are located there.

== See also ==
- List of railway stations in Japan
