= Kashii-Miyamae Station =

Railway station in Fukuoka, Japan

Kashii-Miyamae Station 香椎宮前駅
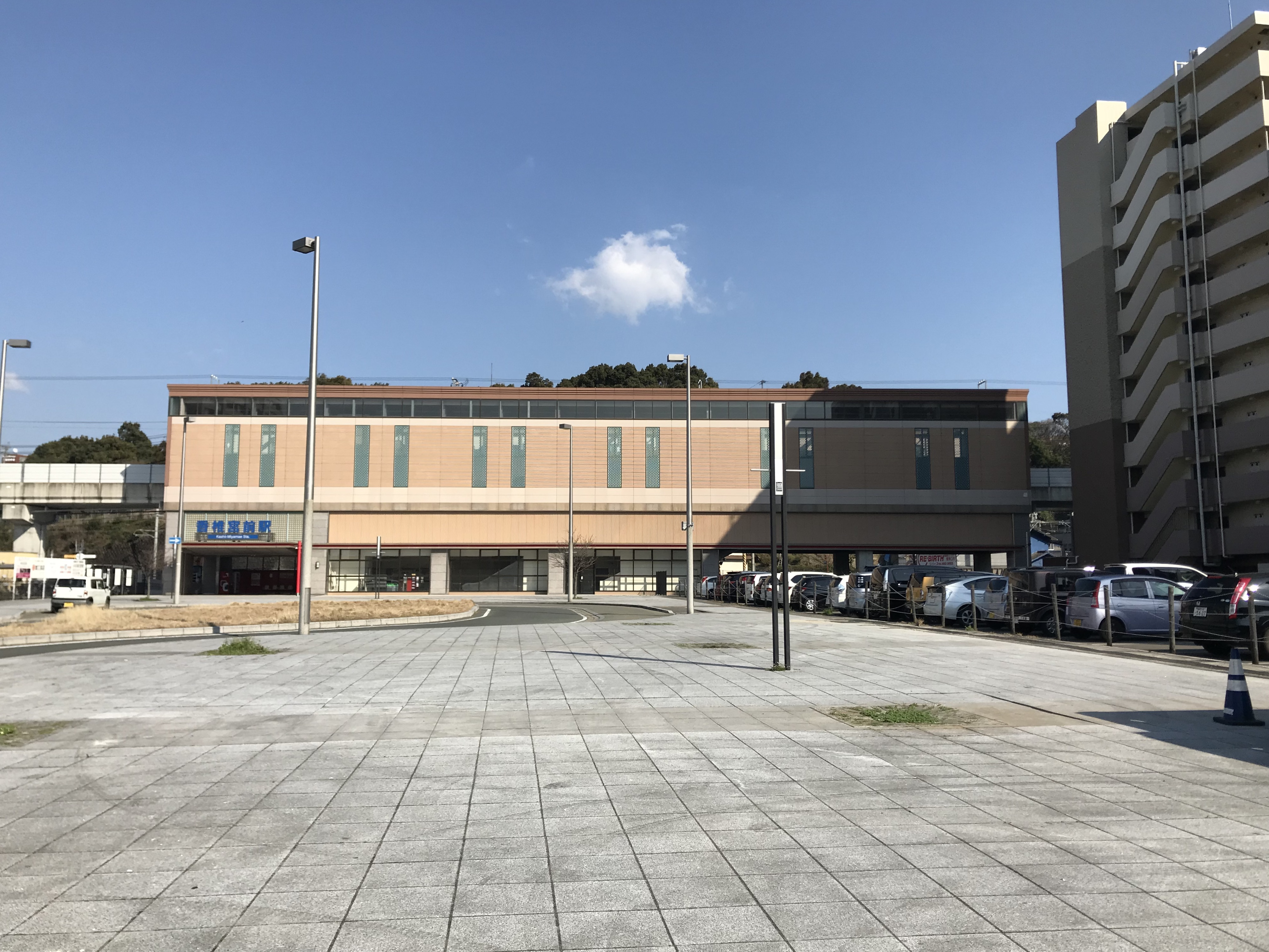
- Kashii-Miyamae Station in March 2018

General information
- Location: 5 Chihaya, Higashi-ku, Fukuoka-shi Fukuoka-ken; Japan
- Coordinates: 33°39′16.77″N 130°26′33.09″E
- Operator: Nishi-Nippon Railroad
- Line: ■ Nishitetsu Kaizuka Line
- Distance: 3.0 km from Kaizuka
- Platforms: 1 side platform

Other information
- Station code: NK04
- Website: Official website

History
- Opened: 1 March 1959

Passengers
- FY2022: 2181

Services
Preceding station	Nishitetsu	Following station
Nishitetsu Chihaya towards Kaizuka	Kaizuka Line	Nishitetsu Kashii towards Nishitetsu Shingū
Location
- Location within Fukuoka Prefecture Location within Japan

Kashii-Miyamae Station (香椎宮前駅, Kashiimiyamae-eki) s a passenger railway station located in Higashi-ku, Fukuoka Fukuoka Prefecture, Japan. It is operated by the private transportation company Nishi-Nippon Railroad (NNR), and has station number NK04.

== Lines ==
The station is served by the Nishitetsu Kaizuka Line and is 3.0 kilometers from the terminus of the line at Kaizuka.

== Station layout ==
The station consists of one elevated side platform with the station building underneath.

== History ==
The station opened on 1 March 1959.

== Passenger statistics ==
In fiscal 2022, the station was used by 2181 passengers daily.

== Surrounding area ==
- Kashii-gū
- Japan National Route 3

== See also ==
- List of railway stations in Japan
