= Kashii-Kaenmae Station =

Railway station in Fukuoka, Japan

Kashii-Kaenmae Station 香椎花園前駅
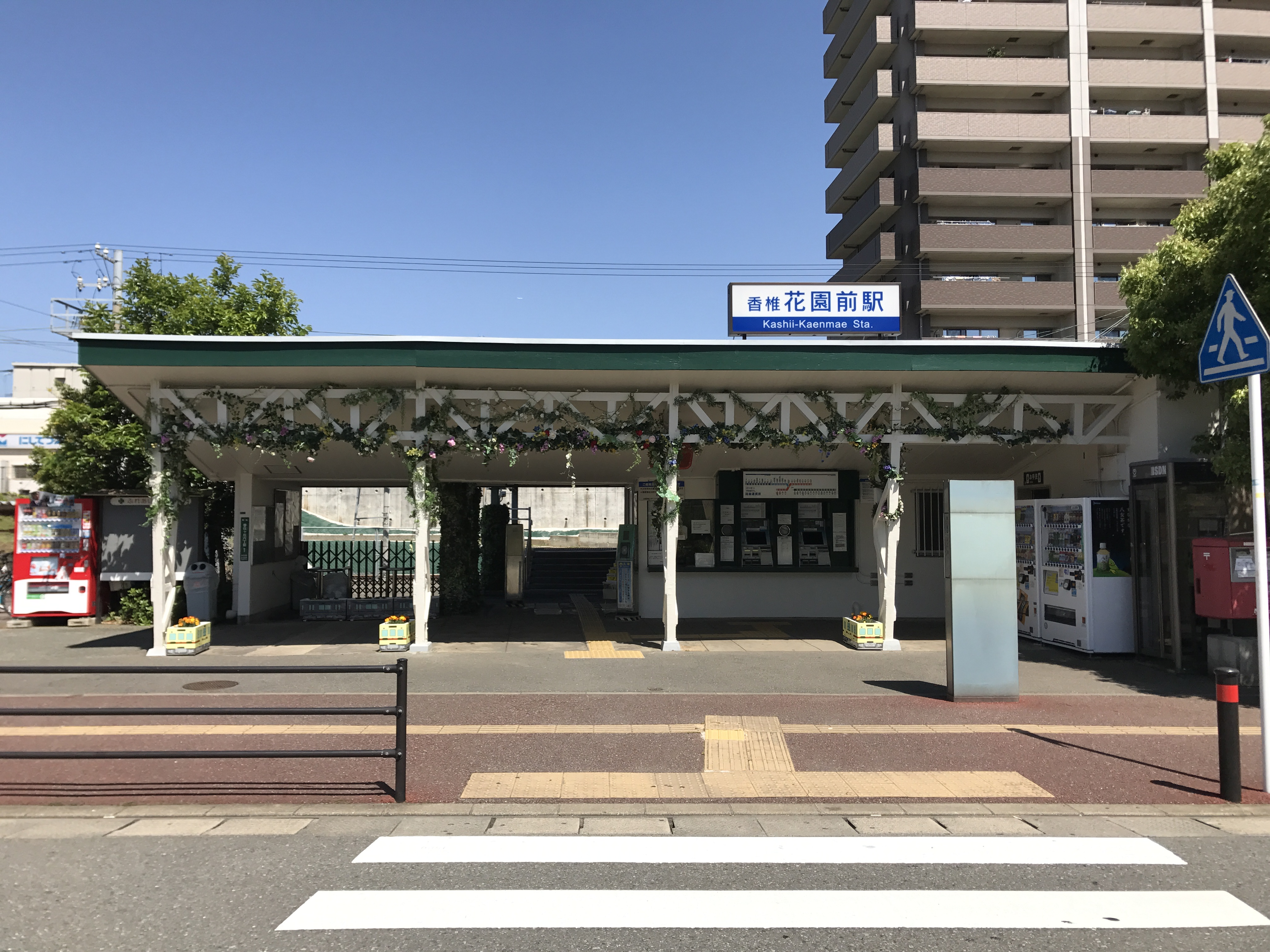
- Kashii-Kaenmae Station in 2017

General information
- Location: 6-chome Kashiigaoka, Higashi-ku, Fukuoka-shi, Fukuoka-ken; Japan
- Coordinates: 33°40′11.52″N 130°26′4.20″E
- Line: ■ Nishitetsu Kaizuka Line
- Distance: 5.0 km from Kaizuka
- Platforms: 1 side platform

Other information
- Station code: NK06
- Website: Official website

History
- Opened: 1 April 1951
- Former names: Fukunichienmae (to 1942); Undōjō-mae (to 1957)

Passengers
- FY2022: 2725

Services
Preceding station	Nishitetsu	Following station
Nishitetsu Kashii towards Kaizuka	Kaizuka Line	Tōnoharu towards Nishitetsu Shingū
Location
- Location within Fukuoka Prefecture Location within Japan

Kashii-Kaenmae Station (香椎花園前駅, Kashii-Kaenmae-eki) is a passenger railway station located in Higashi-ku, Fukuoka Fukuoka Prefecture, Japan. It is operated by the private transportation company Nishi-Nippon Railroad (NNR), and has station number NK06.

== Lines ==
The station is served by the Nishitetsu Kaizuka Line and is 5.0 kilometers from the terminus of the line at Kaizuka.

== Station layout ==
The station consists of one side platform. The station formerly had two opposed offset side platforms, but one platform was late removed, although the track remains in situ for use as a siding.

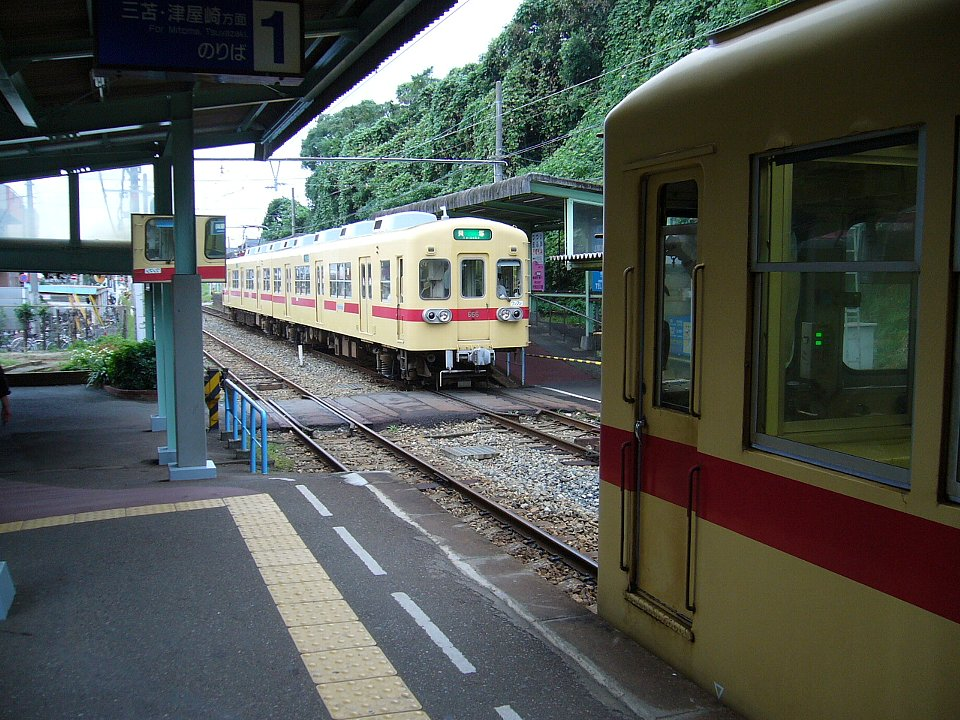
Platform placed diagonally across (October 2006) - Currently, the platform on the right side has been removed.

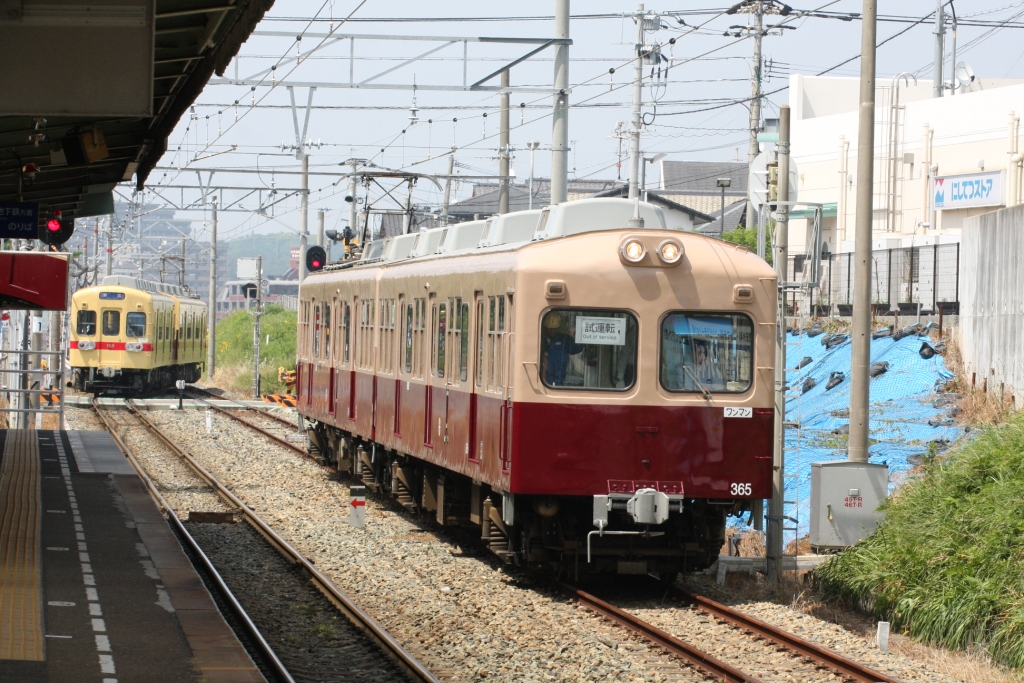
Exchange of trial train and commercial train (May 2014)

== History ==
The station opened as a temporary stop on 1 April 1941 as a station on the Hakata Bay Railway Steamship Company under the name of Fukunichienmae Station (香椎福日園前). It was renamed Undōjō-mae Station (運動場前駅) on 1 April 1942. The company merged with the Kyushu Electric Railway (later Nishitetsu) on 19 September 1942. The station was renamed on 15 May 1950. The current station building was completed in 1949. The station was renamed to its present name on 13 May 1957.

== Passenger statistics ==
In fiscal 2022, the station was used by 2725 passengers daily.

== Surrounding area ==
The station is located in a residential area. The station serves the Kashii-Kaen amusement park.

- Kyūsandai-mae Station - JR Kagoshima Main Line
- Fukuoka Women's University
- Fukuoka Prefectural Kasumioka High School
- Fukuoka City Kashii Daini Junior High School
- Fukuoka City Kasumioka Elementary School

== See also ==
- List of railway stations in Japan
