= Najima Station =

Railway station in Fukuoka, Japan

Najima Station 名島駅
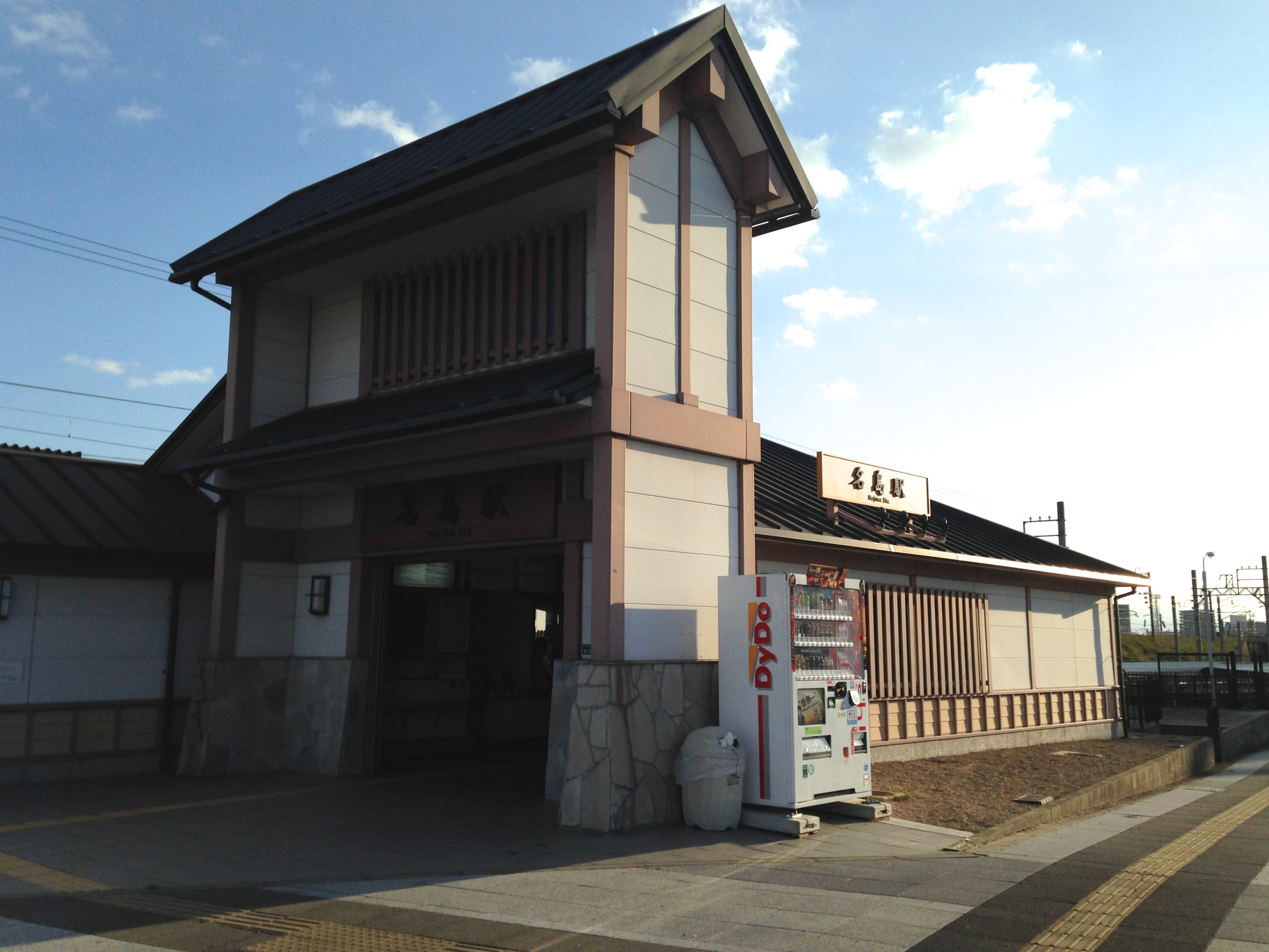
- Najima Station in 2015

General information
- Location: 3-chome Najima, Higashi-ku, Fukuoka-shi, Fukuoka-ken; Japan
- Coordinates: 33°38′33.63″N 130°25′54.23″E
- Operator: Nishi-Nippon Railroad
- Line: ■ Nishitetsu Kaizuka Line
- Distance: 1.4 km from Kaizuka
- Platforms: 1 island platform

Other information
- Station code: NK02
- Website: Official website

History
- Opened: 25 May 1925

Passengers
- FY2022: 3114

Services
Preceding station	Nishitetsu	Following station
Kaizuka Terminus	Kaizuka Line	Chihaya towards Nishitetsu Shingū
Location
- Location within Fukuoka Prefecture Location within Japan

Najima Station (名島駅, Najima-eki) is a passenger railway station located in Higashi-ku, Fukuoka Fukuoka Prefecture, Japan. It is operated by the private transportation company Nishi-Nippon Railroad (NNR), and has station number NK02.

== Lines ==
The station is served by the Nishitetsu Kaizuka Line and is 1.4 kilometers from the terminus of the line at Kaizuka.

== Station layout ==
The station consists of one island platforms and two tracks, connected to the station building by a level crossing. The station building is styled after Najima Castle. The station is staffed.

== Platforms ==
1	■ Nishitetsu Kaizuka Line	for Chihaya and Nishitetsu Shingū
2	■ Nishitetsu Kaizuka Line	for Kaizuka

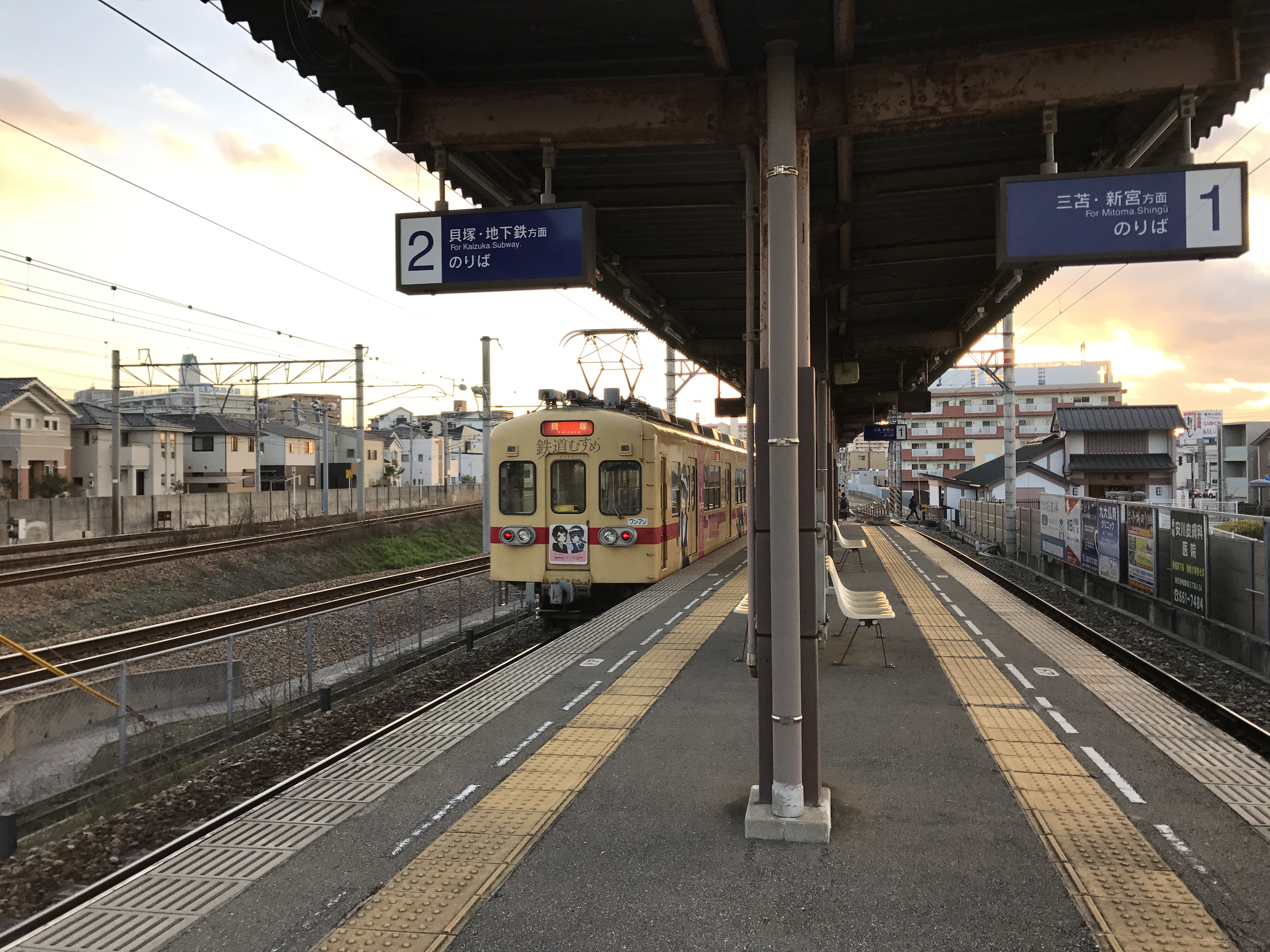
Train of Nishitetsu Kaizuka Line at Najima Station

== History ==
The station opened on 25 May 1925 as a station on the Hakata Bay Railway Steamship Company. The company merged with the Kyushu Electric Railway (later Nishitetsu) on 19 September 1942. The current station building was completed in August 2004.

== Passenger statistics ==
In fiscal 2022, the station was used by 3114 passengers daily.

== Surrounding area ==
- Japan National Route 3
- Fukuoka City Najima Elementary School

== See also ==
- List of railway stations in Japan
