= Gannosu Station =

Railway station in Fukuoka, Japan

JD 03 Gannosu Station 雁ノ巣駅
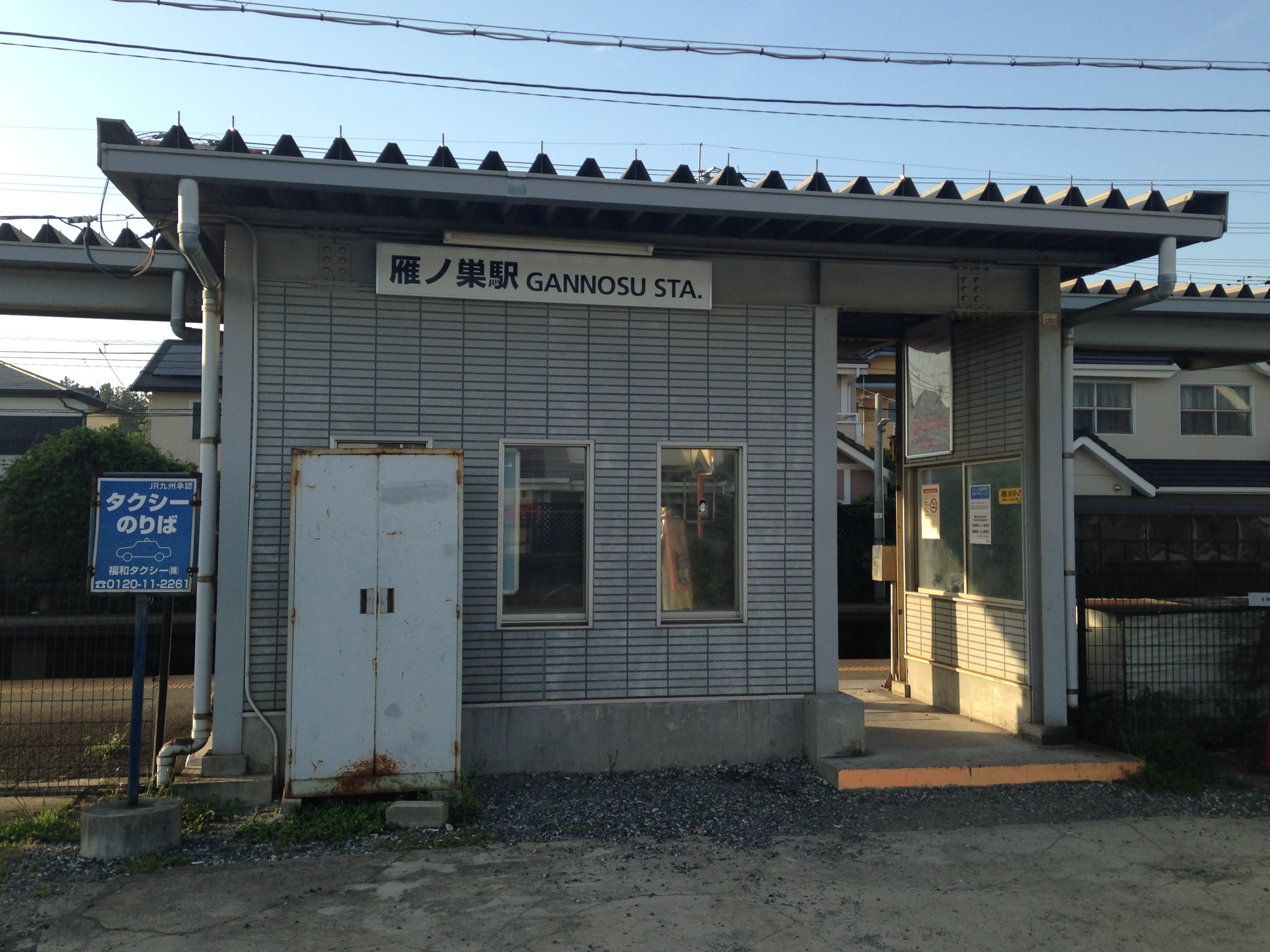
- Gannosu Station in 2015

General information
- Location: 2-chōme-38 Gannosu, Higashi-ku, Fukuoka-shi, Fukuoka-ken, 811-0206; Japan
- Coordinates: 33°41′02″N 130°24′12″E
- Operator: JR Kyushu
- Line: JD Kashii Line
- Distance: 6.5 km from Saitozaki
- Platforms: 1 side platform
- Tracks: 1

Construction
- Structure type: At grade
- Accessible: Yes - platforms linked by level crossing with ramps

Other information
- Status: Remotely managed station
- Website: Official website

History
- Opened: 1 January 1904
- Former names: Nata (until 1960)

Passengers
- FY2020: 313 daily
- Rank: 271th (among JR Kyushu stations)

Services
Preceding station	JR Kyushu	Following station
Uminonakamichi towards Saitozaki	Kashii Line Local	Nata towards Umi
Location
- Location within Fukuoka Prefecture Location within Japan

Gannosu Station (雁ノ巣駅, Gannosu-eki) is a passenger railway station located in Higashi-ku, Fukuoka, Fukuoka Prefecture, Japan. It is operated by JR Kyushu.

== Lines ==
The station is served by the Kashii Line and is located 6.5 km from the starting point of the line at Saitozaki.

== Station layout ==
The station, which is unstaffed, consists of two side platforms serving two tracks. A small station building serves as a waiting room. An automatic ticket vending machine is installed on one of the platforms. The station also has another entrance on the other side of the tracks. This is also equipped with farecard readers and leads to a level crossing which links the two platforms with ramps.

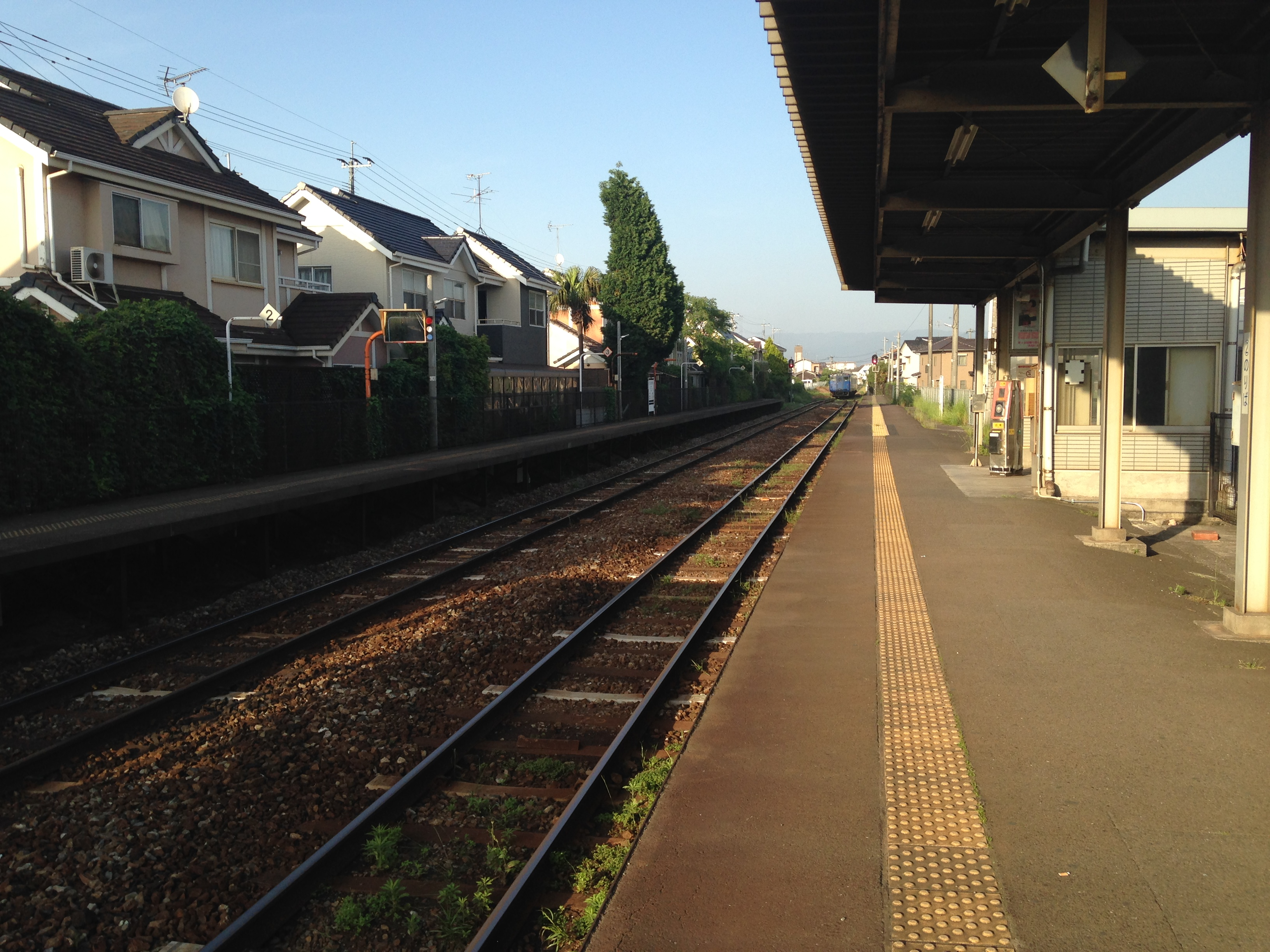
A view of the station platforms and tracks looking in the direction of Nata.

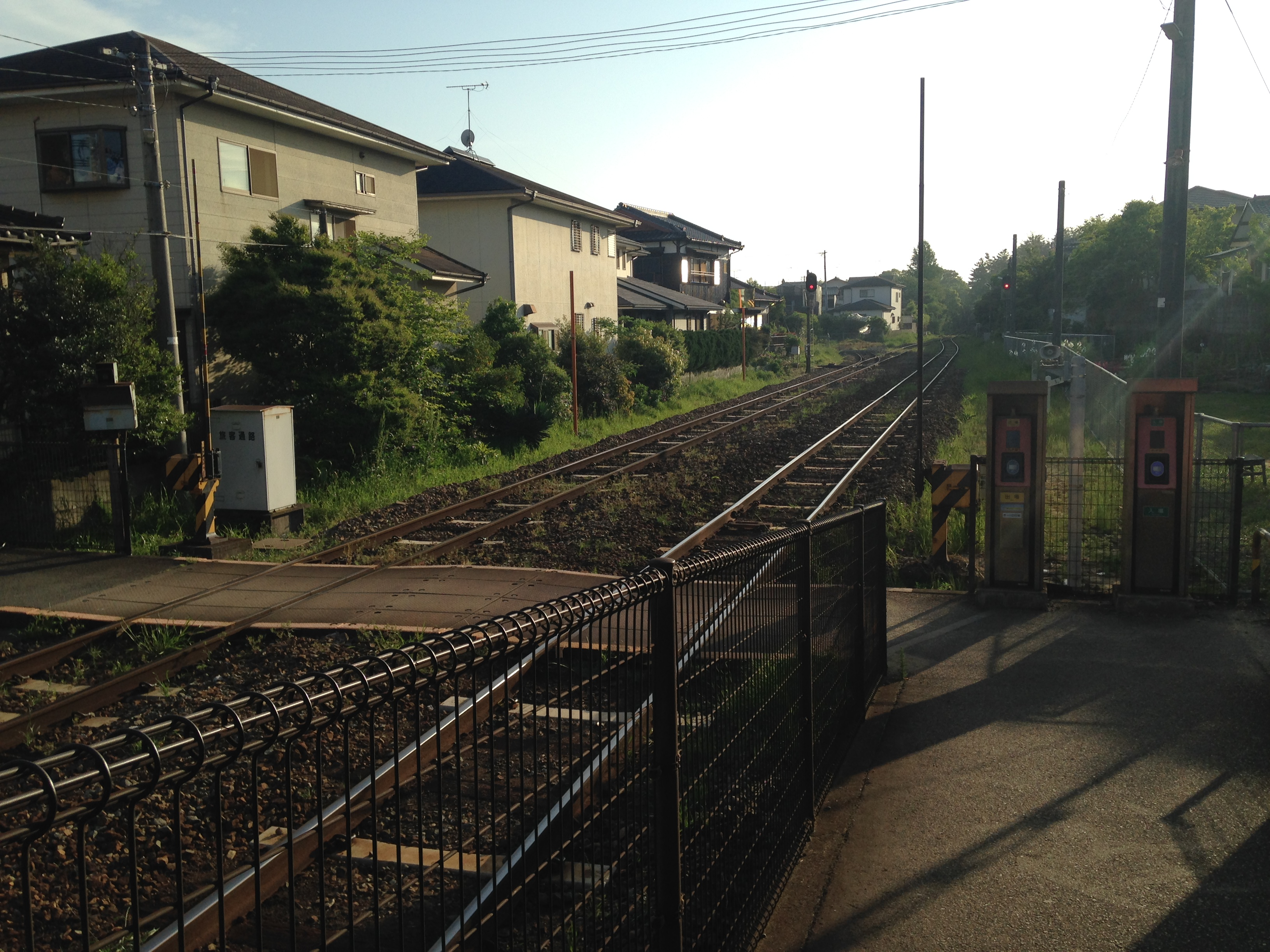
Entrance to the station from the side opposite the station building. Note the fare card readers and the level crossing.

== History ==
The station was opened as Nata Station (奈多駅, Nata-eki) on 1 January 1904 by the private Hakata Bay Railway as an intermediate station on a track it laid between Saitozaki and Sue. On 19 September 1942, the company, now renamed the Hakata Bay Railway and Steamship Company, with a few other companies, merged into the Kyushu Electric Tramway. Three days later, the new conglomerate, which had assumed control of the station, became the Nishi-Nippon Railroad (Nishitetsu). On 1 May 1944, Nishitetsu's track from Saitozaki to Sue and the later extensions to Shinbaru and Umi were nationalized. Japanese Government Railways (JGR) took over control of the station. The station was renamed Gannosu and the track which served it was designated the Kashii Line. With the privatization of Japanese National Railways (JNR), the successor of JGR, on 1 April 1987, JR Kyushu took over control of the station. The old name Nata was given to the next station on the line which opened in 1960.

On 14 March 2015, the station, along with others on the line, became a remotely managed "Smart Support Station". Under this scheme, although the station became unstaffed, passengers using the automatic ticket vending machines or ticket gates could receive assistance via intercom from staff at a central support centre.

== Passenger statistics ==
In fiscal 2020, the station was used by an average of 313 passengers daily (boarding passengers only), and it ranked 271th among the busiest stations of JR Kyushu.

== Surrounding area ==
- Gannosu Recreation Center (Gannosu Baseball Stadium, Avispa Fukuoka Practice Ground, etc.)
- Fukuoka District Water Supply Corporation Uminonakamichi Nata Seawater Desalination Center (Mamizu Pier)
- Ministry of Land, Infrastructure, Transport and Tourism, Civil Aviation Bureau, Fukuoka Air Traffic Control Department/Air Traffic Management Center (ATMC)

== See also ==
- List of railway stations in Japan
