= Kashii, Japan =

Area of Fukuoka, Japan

Kashii (香椎) is an area of Fukuoka City, Japan. It is located in the eastern ward of Higashi-ku. Island city, a controversial new development, is located near here. Kashii JR station is on the Kagoshima Main Line of Kyushu Railway Company (JR Kyushu), and the Kashii Line also connects here. See also Nishitetsu Kashii Station.

== See also ==
- Chihaya Station for Kashiihama
