= Wajiro Station =

Railway station in Fukuoka, Japan

NK 08 JD 05 Wajiro Station 和白駅
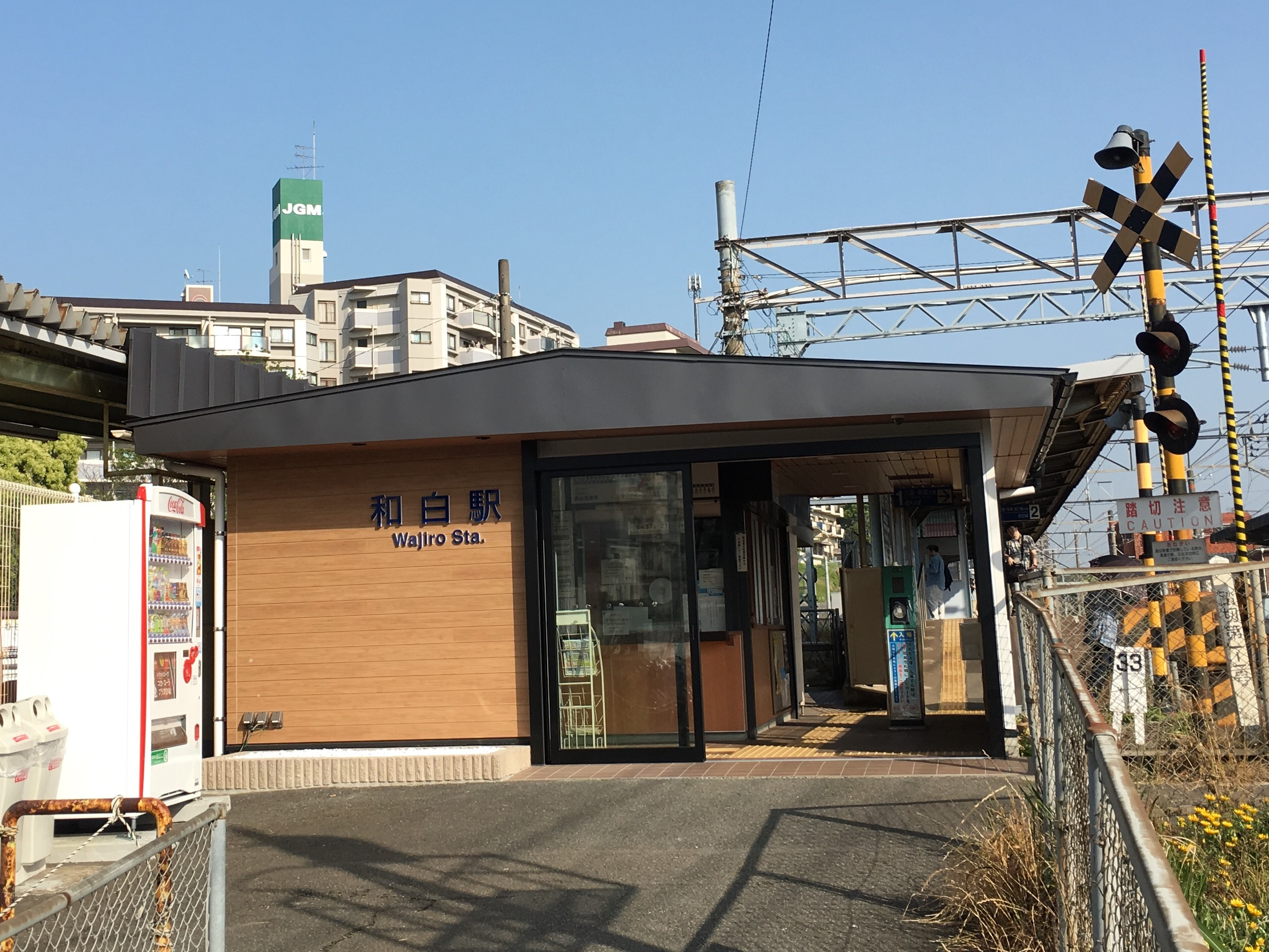
- Nishitetsu Wajiro Station

General information
- Location: 3-8-1 Wajiro, Higashi-ku, Fukuoka-shi, Fukuoka-ken; Japan
- Coordinates: 33°41′19.31″N 130°25′47.34″E
- Operator: Nishitetsu; JR Kyushu
- Line: ■ Nishitetsu Kaizuka Line JD Kashii Line
- Distance: 9.2 km from Saitozaki
- Platforms: 4 side platforms

Other information
- Status: Staffed
- Website: Official website

History
- Opened: 24 January 1905

Services
Preceding station	JR Kyushu	Following station
Nata JD 04 towards Saitozaki	Kashii Line	Kashii JD 06 towards Umi
Preceding station	Nishitetsu	Following station
Tōnoharu towards Kaizuka	Kaizuka Line	Mitoma towards Nishitetsu Shingū
Location
- Location within Fukuoka Prefecture Location within Japan

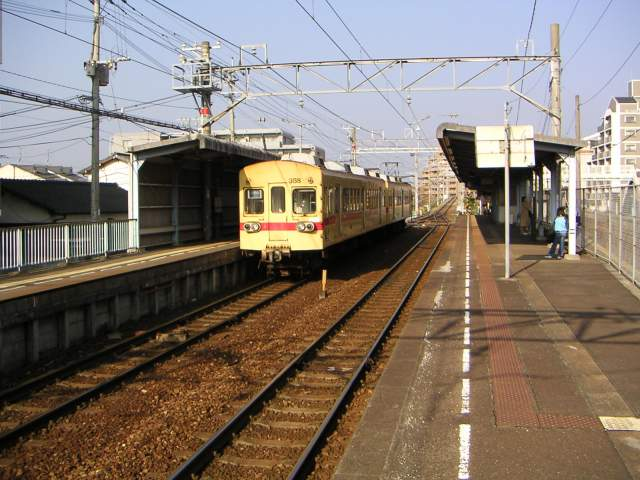
Platforms for Nishitetsu Wajiro Station

Wajiro Station (和白駅, Wajiro-eki) is a junction passenger railway station located in Higashi-ku, Fukuoka, Japan. It is operated by JR Kyushu and by the private transportation company Nishitetsu.

== Lines ==
The station is served by the Kashii Line and is located 9.2 km from the starting point of the line at Saitozaki. It is also served by the Nishitetsu Kaizuka Line, and is 7.2 kilometers from the terminus of that line at Kaizuka.

== Station layout ==
The JR station consists of two opposed side platforms, connected by a footbridge. The station is unattended. The Nishitetsu portion of the station likewise has two opposed side platforms, but connected by a level crossing.

=== Platforms ===
1	■ JD Kashii Line	for Kashii and Umi
2	■ JD Kashii Line	for Saitozaki

1	■ ■ Kaizuka Line	for Kaizuka
2	■ ■ Kaizuka Line	for Nishitetsu Shingū

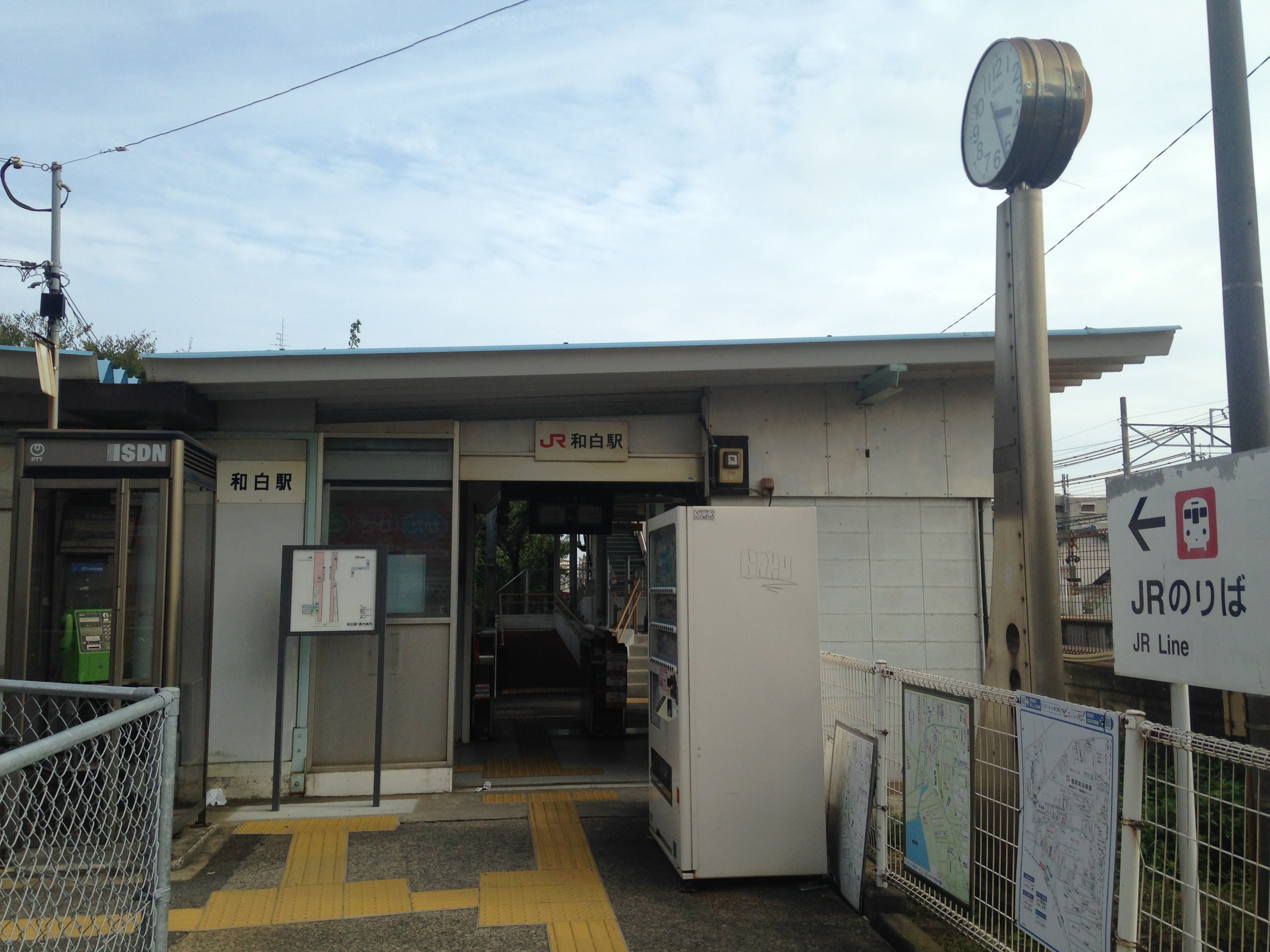
JR Wajiro Station

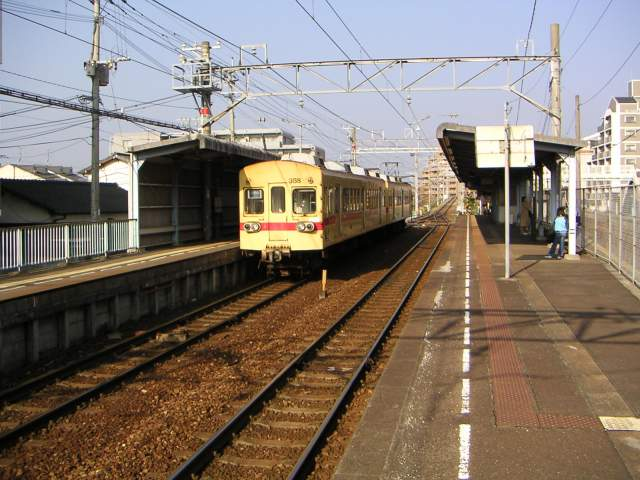
Nishitetsu Platforms

== History ==
On 24 January 1905 the station opened as a simple stop for the Hakata Bay Railway (renamed Hakata Bay Railway Steamship in 1920). Due to a merger on 19 September 1942, it became a station on to the Nishi-Nippon Railway Kasuya Line, which was semi-nationalized on 1 May 1944. It was promoted to a full station at that time. With the privatization of Japanese National Railways (JNR), the successor of JGR, on 1 April 1987, JR Kyushu took over control of the Kashii Line portion of the station. From October 2001 to November 2003, construction work to build a new elevated station was undertaken. The new station was opened on 13 March 2004 and is about 400 metres north of the old location.

== Passenger statistics ==
In fiscal 2020, the station was used by an average of 1306 passengers daily (boarding passengers only), and it ranked 111st among the busiest stations of JR Kyushu. During the same period, the Nishitetsu portion of the station served 1,754 passengers daily.

== Surrounding area ==
- Fukuoka City Wajiraoka Junior High School

== See also ==
- List of railway stations in Japan
