= Mitoma Station =

Railway station in Fukuoka, Japan

Mitoma Station 三苫駅
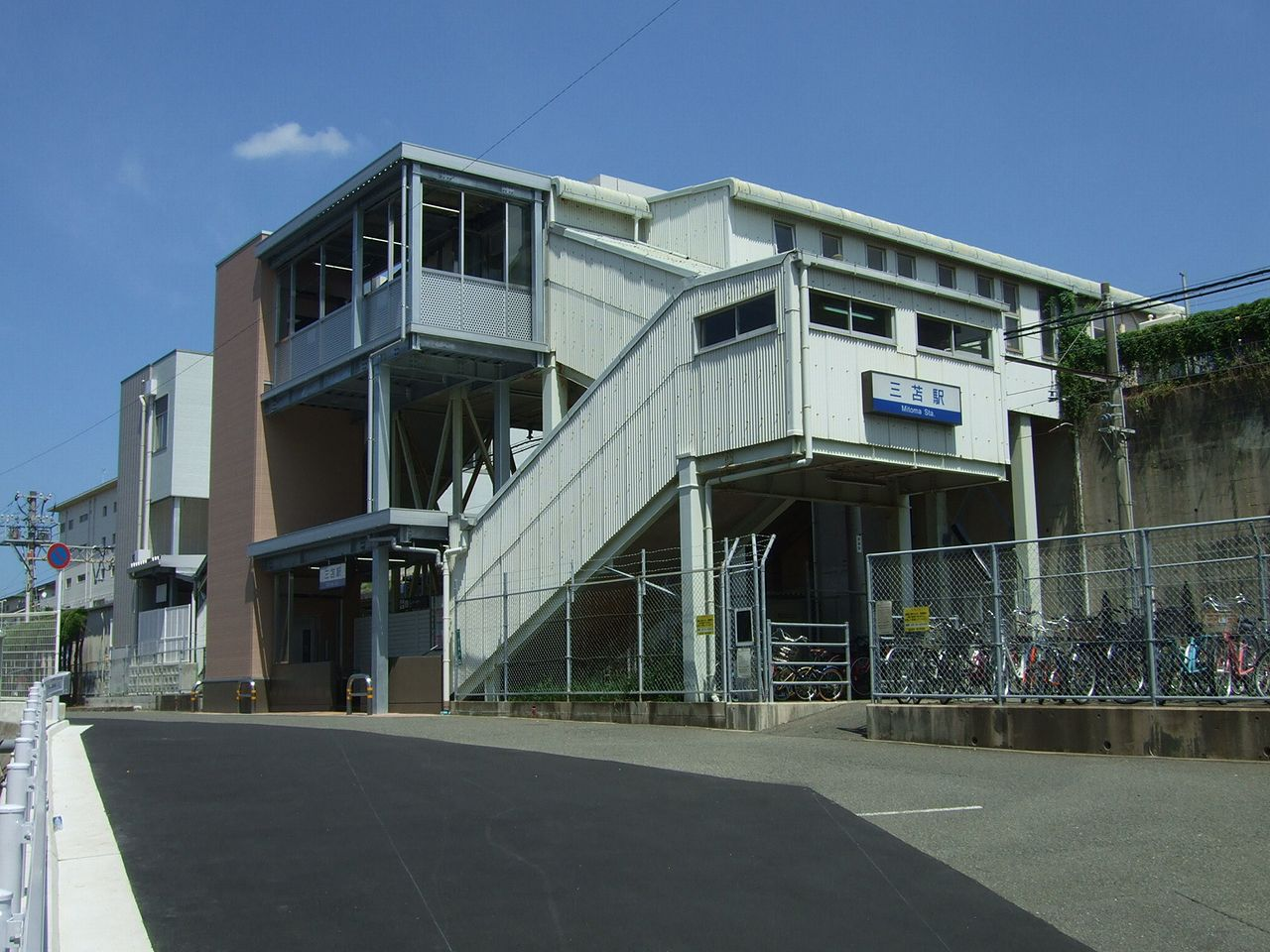
- Mitoma Station in 2014

General information
- Location: 4-chome Miwadai, Higashi-ku, Fukuoka-shi, Fukuoka-ken; Japan
- Coordinates: 33°42′7.46″N 130°25′21.16″E
- Operator: Nishi-Nippon Railroad
- Line: ■ Nishitetsu Kaizuka Line
- Distance: 9.0 km from Kaizuka
- Platforms: 2 side platforms

Construction
- Structure type: Elevated

Other information
- Station code: NK09
- Website: Official website

History
- Opened: 1 July 1925

Passengers
- FY2022: 3250

Services
Preceding station	Nishitetsu	Following station
Wajiro towards Kaizuka	Kaizuka Line	Nishitetsu Shingū Terminus
Location
- Location within Fukuoka Prefecture Location within Japan

Mitoma Station (三苫駅, Mitoma-eki) is a passenger railway station located in Higashi-ku, Fukuoka Fukuoka Prefecture, Japan. It is operated by the private transportation company Nishi-Nippon Railroad (NNR), and has station number NK09.

== Lines ==
The station is served by the Nishitetsu Kaizuka Line and is 9.0 kilometers from the terminus of the line at Kaizuka.

== Station layout ==
The station consists of two side platforms and two tracks, connected by an elevated station building. The station is staffed.

== Platforms ==
1	■ Nishitetsu Kaizuka Line	for Nishitetsu Shingū
2	■ Nishitetsu Kaizuka Line	for Chihaya and Kaizuka

== History ==
The station opened on 1 July 1925 as a station on the Hakata Bay Railway Steamship Company. The company merged with the Kyushu Electric Railway (later Nishitetsu) on 19 September 1942. The station was renamed on 15 May 1950. The current station building was completed in November 1986.

== Passenger statistics ==
In fiscal 2022, the station was used by 3250 passengers daily.

== Surrounding area ==
The station is located at the northern end of Higashi Ward, near the northeastern end of Fukuoka City. The area surrounding both the east and west exits is residential.

- Fukkōdai-mae Station - JR Kagoshima Main Line
- Mitoma Elementary School
- Miwadai Elementary School

== See also ==
- List of railway stations in Japan
