= Nata Station =

Railway station in Fukuoka, Japan

JD 04 Nata Station 奈多駅
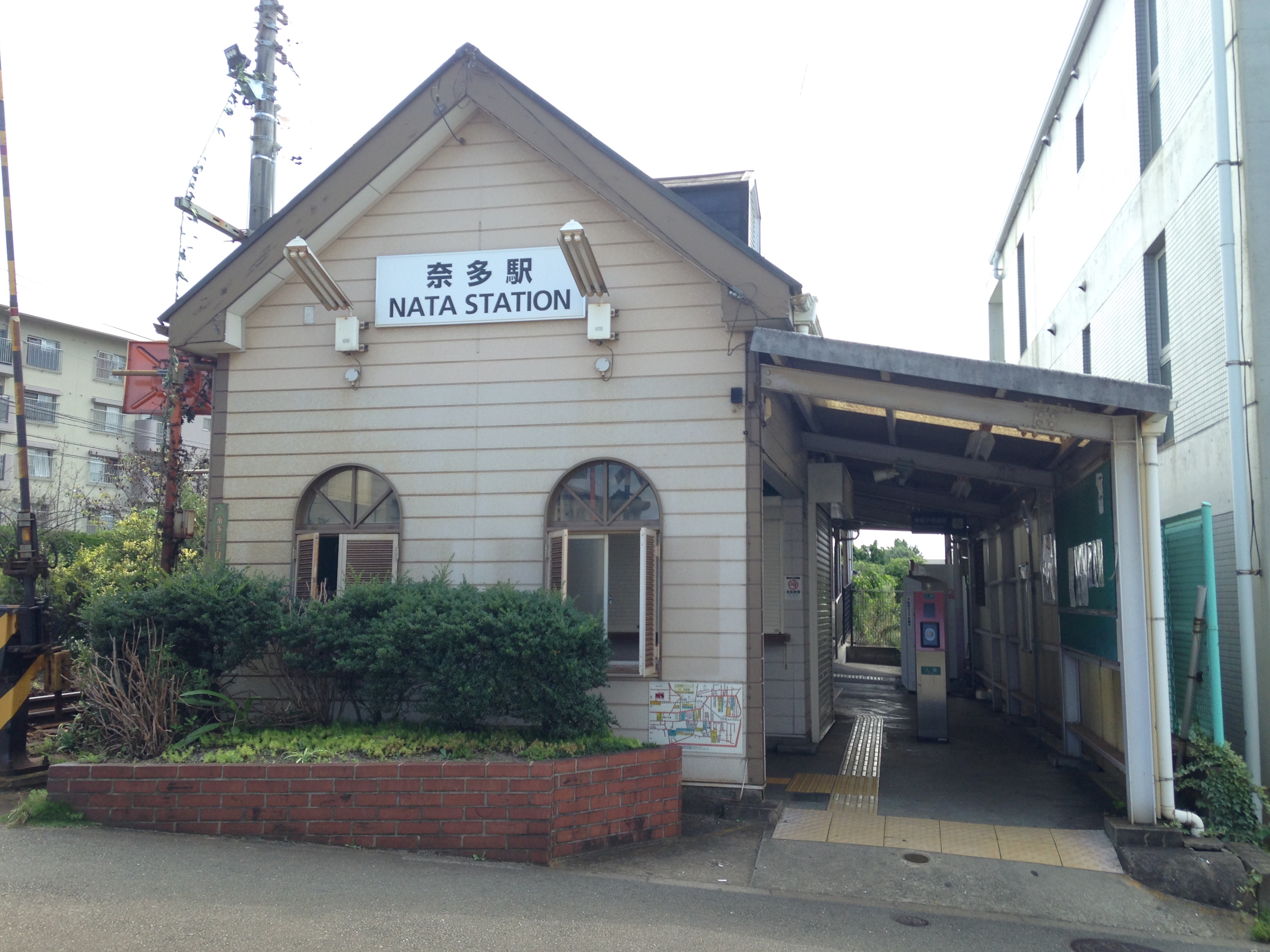
- Nata Station in 2016

General information
- Location: 3-chōme-6 Nata, Higashi-ku, Fukuoka-shi, Fukuoka-ken, 811-0204; Japan
- Coordinates: 33°41′12″N 130°24′45″E
- Operator: JR Kyushu
- Line: JD Kashii Line
- Distance: 7.4 km from Saitozaki
- Platforms: 1 side platform
- Tracks: 1

Construction
- Structure type: At grade
- Accessible: Yes - ramp to platform

Other information
- Status: Remotely managed station
- Website: Official website

History
- Opened: 1 August 1960

Passengers
- FY2020: 882 daily
- Rank: 150th (among JR Kyushu stations)

Services
| Preceding station | JR Kyushu | Following station |
|---|---|---|
| Gannosu towards Saitozaki | Kashii Line Local | Wajiro towards Umi |
Location
- Location within Fukuoka Prefecture Location within Japan

Nata Station (奈多駅, Nata-eki) is a passenger railway station located in Higashi-ku, Fukuoka, Fukuoka Prefecture, Japan. It is operated by JR Kyushu

== Lines ==
The station is served by the Kashii Line and is located 7.4 km from the starting point of the line at Saitozaki.

== Station layout ==
The station, which is unstaffed, consists of a side platform serving a single track. A station building, of timber construction in the European style, houses a waiting area and automatic ticket vending machines. After the ticket gates, a ramp leads to the platform.

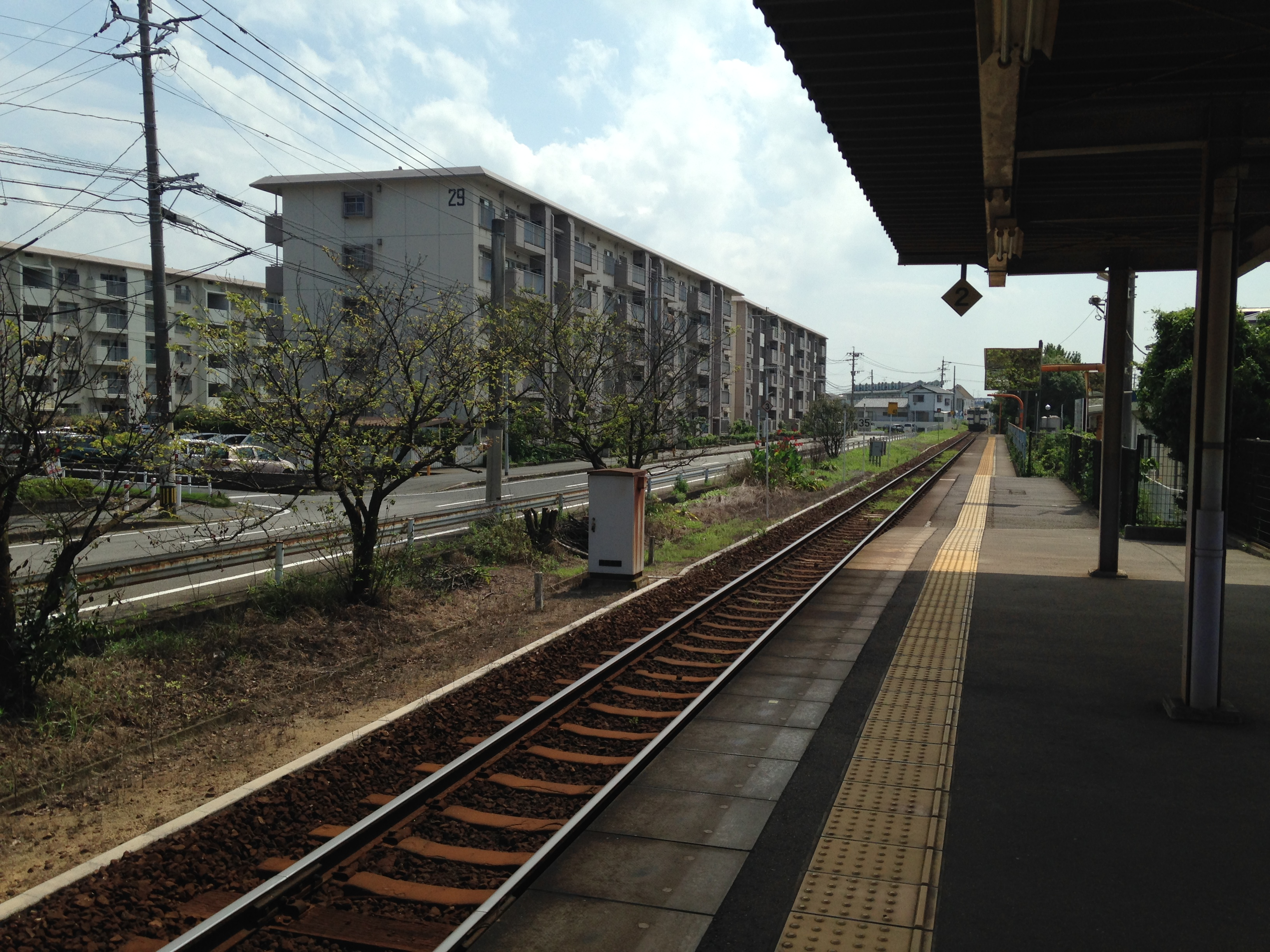
A view of the station platform and track.

== History ==
Japanese National Railways (JNR) opened the station on 1 August 1960 as an additional station on the existing track of the Kashii Line. The name used was one which had once belonged to the previous station on the line which had been renamed to Gannosu in 1944. With the privatization of JNR on 1 April 1987, JR Kyushu took over control of the station.

On 14 March 2015, the station, along with others on the line, became a remotely managed "Smart Support Station". Under this scheme, although the station became unstaffed, passengers using the automatic ticket vending machines or ticket gates could receive assistance via intercom from staff at a central support centre.

== Passenger statistics ==
In fiscal 2020, the station was used by an average of 882 passengers daily (boarding passengers only), and it ranked 150th among the busiest stations of JR Kyushu.

== Surrounding area ==
- Fukuoka City Nada Elementary School

== See also ==
- List of railway stations in Japan
