= Nishitetsu Kashii Station =

Railway station in Fukuoka, Japan

Nishitetsu Kashii Station 西鉄香椎駅
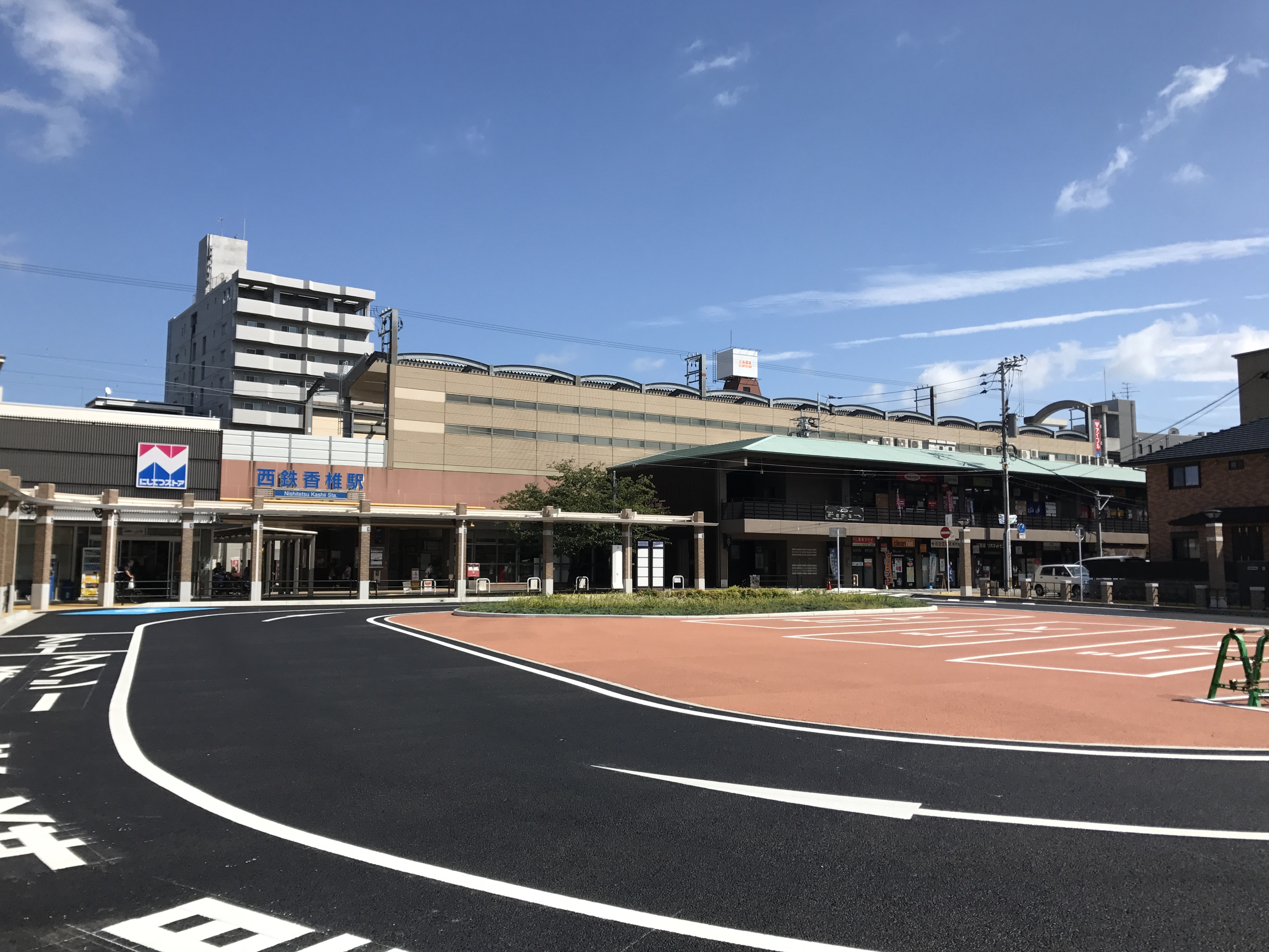
- Nishitetsu Kashii Station in September 2017

General information
- Location: 2-chōme-52 Kashii-ekimae, Higashi-ku, Fukuoka-shi, Fukuoka-ken 813-0013; Japan
- Coordinates: 33°39′33.75″N 130°26′30.31″E
- Operator: Nishi-Nippon Railroad
- Line: ■ Nishitetsu Kaizuka Line
- Distance: 3.6 km from Kaizuka
- Platforms: 1 island platform

Other information
- Station code: NK05
- Website: Official website

History
- Opened: 1 July 1925
- Former names: Shin-Kashii (to 1950)

Passengers
- FY2022: 3925

Services
Preceding station	Nishitetsu	Following station
Kashii-Miyamae towards Kaizuka	Kaizuka Line	Kashii-Kaenmae towards Nishitetsu Shingū
Location
- Location within Fukuoka Prefecture Location within Japan

Nishitetsu Kashii Station (西鉄香椎駅, Nishitetsu-Kashii-eki) is a passenger railway station located in Higashi-ku, Fukuoka Fukuoka Prefecture, Japan. It is operated by the private transportation company Nishi-Nippon Railroad (NNR), and has station number NK05.

== Lines ==
The station is served by the Nishitetsu Kaizuka Line and is 3.6 kilometers from the terminus of the line at Kaizuka.

== Station layout ==
The station consists of one elevated island platform with the station building underneath. The station is staffed.

== Platforms ==
1	■ Nishitetsu Kaizuka Line	for Nishitetsu Shingū
2	■ Nishitetsu Kaizuka Line	for Chihaya and Kaizuka

== History ==
The station opened as Shin-Kashii Station (の新香椎駅) on 1 July 1925 as a station on the Hakata Bay Railway Steamship Company. The company merged with the Kyushu Electric Railway (later Nishitetsu) on 19 September 1942. The station was renamed on 15 May 1950. The current station building was completed in May 2006.

== Passenger statistics ==
In fiscal 2022, the station was used by 3925 passengers daily.

== Surrounding area ==
- Kashii Station - JR Kagoshima Main Line
- Fukuoka Women's University
- Kyushu Sangyo University
- Fukuoka Prefectural Kasumioka High School
- Fukuoka Prefectural Kashii High School

== See also ==
- List of railway stations in Japan
