= Maimatsubara Station =

Railway station in Fukuoka, Japan

JD 08 Maimatsubara Station 舞松原駅
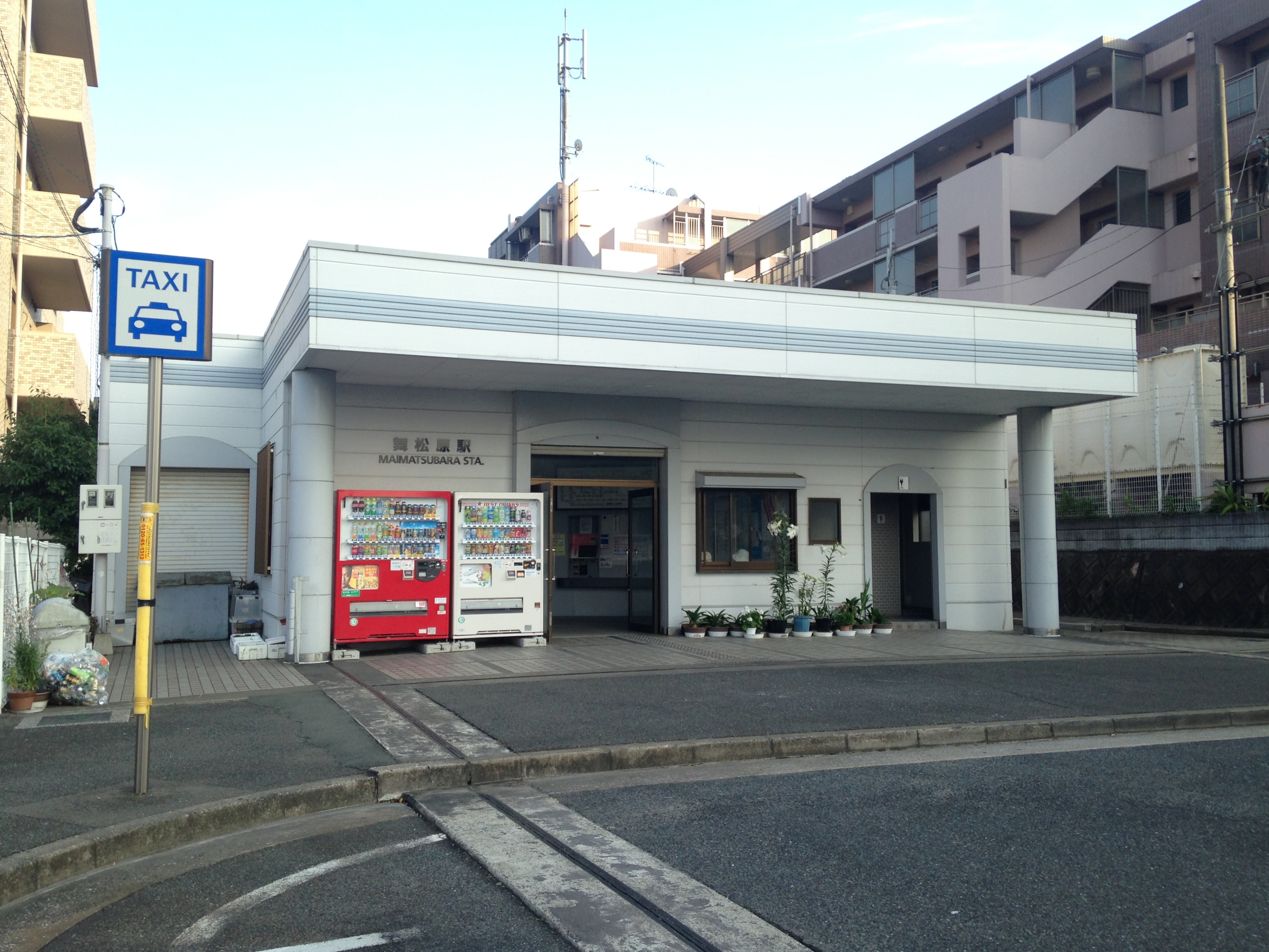
- Maimatsubara Station in 2016

General information
- Location: 5-26-13 Maimatsubara, Higashi-ku, Fukuoka-shi, Fukuoka-ken 813-0042; Japan
- Coordinates: 33°38′44″N 130°27′18″E
- Operator: JR Kyushu
- Line: JD Kashii Line
- Distance: 14.8 km from Saitozaki
- Platforms: 1 side platform
- Tracks: 1

Construction
- Structure type: Cutting
- Cycle facilities: Designated parking area for bikes
- Accessible: No - steps to platform

Other information
- Status: Remotely managed station
- Website: Official website

History
- Opened: 1 March 1994

Passengers
- FY2020: 806 daily
- Rank: 161st (among JR Kyushu stations)

Services
Preceding station	JR Kyushu	Following station
Kashii-Jingū towards Saitozaki	Kashii Line Local	Doi towards Umi
Location
- Location within Fukuoka Prefecture Location within Japan

Maimatsubara Station (舞松原駅, Maimatsubara-eki) is a passenger railway station located in Higashi-ku, Fukuoka, Fukuoka Prefecture, Japan. It is operated by JR Kyushu

== Lines ==
The station is served by the Kashii Line and is located 14.8 km from the starting point of the line at Saitozaki.

== Station layout ==
The station, which is unstaffed, consists of a side platform serving a single track in a cutting under street level with high rise buildings around it. The station building is at street level and spans the cutting. It houses a small waiting area and automatic ticket vending machines. A flight of steps leads down to the platform. A designated parking area for bikes is provided outside the station.

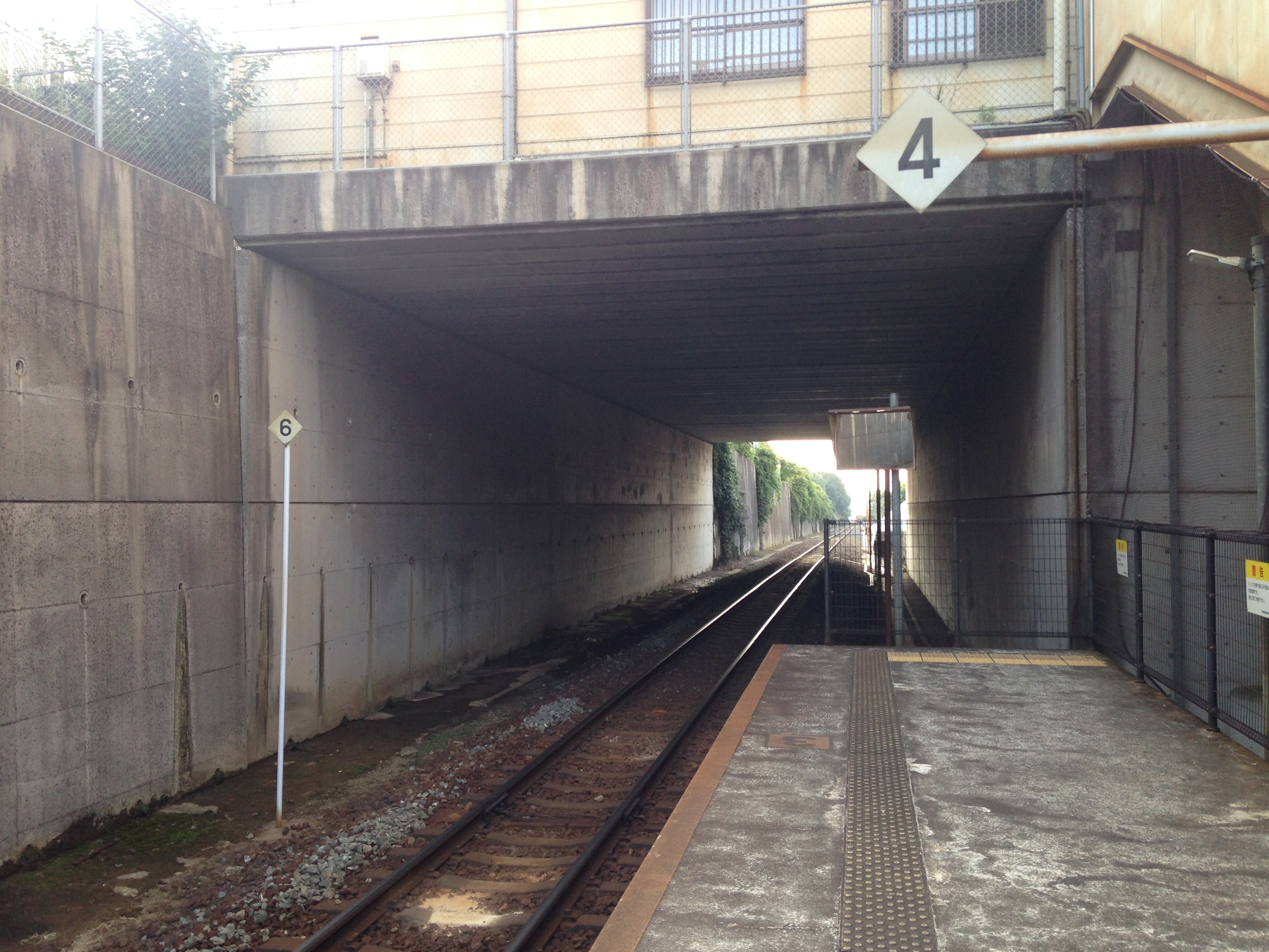
A view of the platform and track. The yellow walls above belong to the station building.

== History ==
The station was opened by JR Kyushu on 1 March 1994 as an additional station on the existing track of the Kashii Line.

On 14 March 2015, the station became a remotely managed "Smart Support Station". Under this scheme, although the station became unstaffed, passengers using the automatic ticket vending machines or ticket gates could receive assistance via intercom from staff at a central support centre.

== Passenger statistics ==
In fiscal 2020, the station was used by an average of 806 passengers daily (boarding passengers only), and it ranked 161st among the busiest stations of JR Kyushu.

== Surrounding area ==
The surrounding area is a residential area that was first developed by JR Kyushu and two other companies, and there are many condominiums.

- Fukuoka City Maimatsubara Elementary School
- Fukuoka City Aoba Elementary School
- Fukuoka City Aoba Junior High School
- Fukuoka City Higashi Fukuoka Special Needs School

== See also ==
- List of railway stations in Japan
