= Mitoma =

Mitoma may refer to:

- Kaoru Mitoma (born 1997), Japanese footballer
- Mitoma Station, railway station in Fukuoka, Japan

== See also ==
- Mitomi, Yamanashi, village in Japan
- Miitomo, social network
- Mitooma, town in Uganda
