= Nishitetsu Kaizuka Line =

Railway line in Fukuoka prefecture, Japan

Kaizuka Line
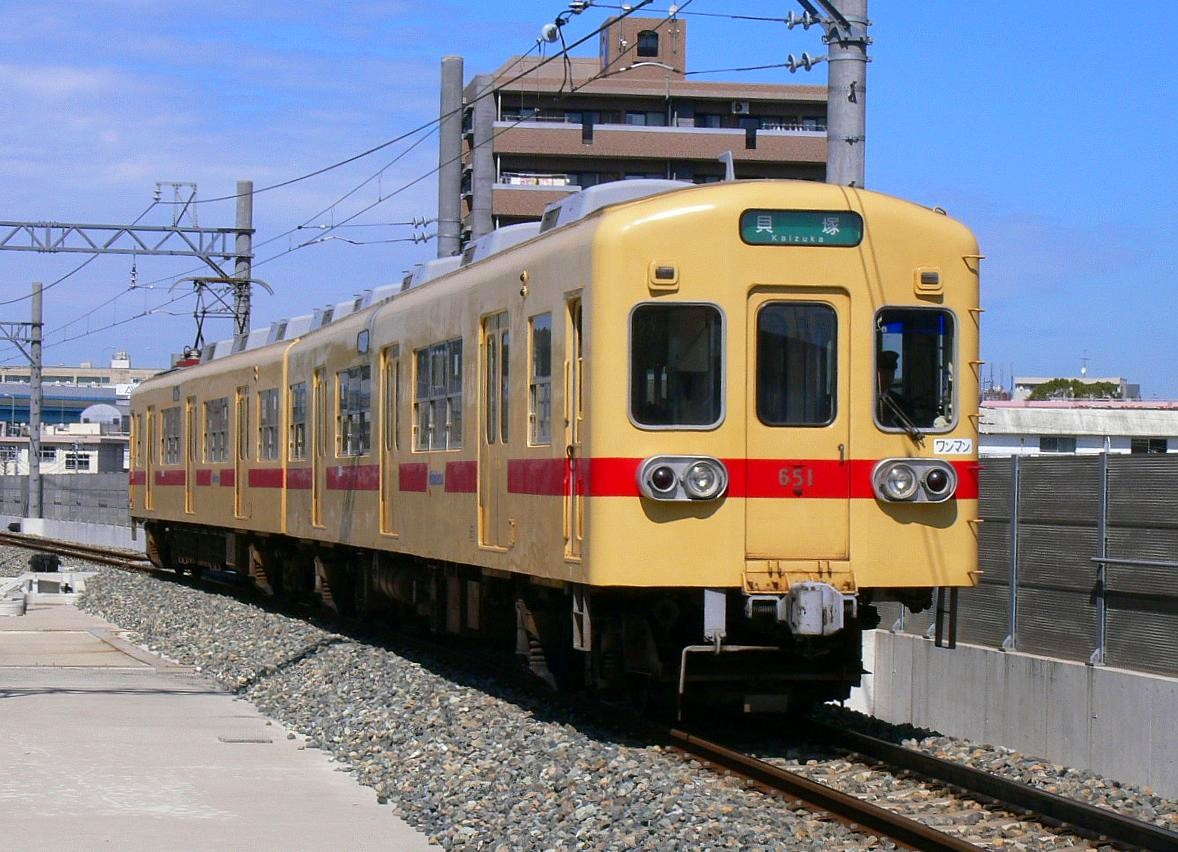
- Kaizuka Line 600 series train

Overview
- Owner: Nishi-Nippon Railroad (Nishitetsu)
- Line number: NK
- Termini: Kaizuka; Nishitetsu Shingū
- Stations: 10

Service
- Depot: Tatara

History
- Opened: 23 May 1927; 99 years ago

Technical
- Line length: 11.0 km (6.8 mi)
- Track gauge: 1,067 mm (3 ft 6 in)
- Electrification: 1,500 V DC

The Kaizuka Line (貝塚線, Kaizuka-sen) is an 11.0 km (6.8 mi) Japanese railway line in Fukuoka prefecture, run by the private railway operator Nishi-Nippon Railroad (Nishitetsu). It links Kaizuka Station in Higashi-ku, Fukuoka with Nishitetsu Shingū Station in Shingū. It connects to the Kashii Line of JR Kyushu at Wajiro, and the Hakozaki Line of Fukuoka City Subway at Kaizuka.

The line was 20.9 km (13.0 mi) long until Nishitetsu closed the 9.9 km section between Nishitetsu Shingū and Tsuyazaki stations on April 1, 2007. Until then, the line was called Miyajidake Line (宮地岳線, Miyajidake-sen).

The Kaizuka Line is the most congested railway line in Japan outside the Tokyo Metropolitan area. In Fiscal Year 2022 the congestion rate between Najima and Kaizuka stations was 154% during the morning peak, making it the 2nd most congested railway line in Japan. In Fiscal Year 2023 the congestion rate was 158%, which was equal 5th most congested and the only line outside the Tokyo Metropolitan Area in the list of top 10 most congested railway lines.

== Services ==
All services on the Kaizuka Line are Local trains, stopping at all stations.

As of January 2024, services operate every 10 minutes during weekday morning & afternoon peaks, and every 15 minutes at other times.

== Rolling stock ==
- Nishitetsu 600 series
- Nishitetsu 7050 series (introduced 2026)

== Station list ==
Station name	Japanese	Distance (km)	Connections	Location	
NK 01 Kaizuka	貝塚	0.0	Fukuoka City Subway Hakozaki Line	Higashi-ku, Fukuoka	Fukuoka Prefecture
NK 02 Najima	名島	1.4		Higashi-ku, Fukuoka	Fukuoka Prefecture
NK 03 Nishitetsu Chihaya	西鉄千早	2.5	JA Kagoshima Main Line (Chihaya)	Higashi-ku, Fukuoka	Fukuoka Prefecture
NK 04 Kashii-Miyamae	香椎宮前	3.0		Higashi-ku, Fukuoka	Fukuoka Prefecture
NK 05 Nishitetsu Kashii	西鉄香椎	3.6	JA Kagoshima Main Line (Kashii)	Higashi-ku, Fukuoka	Fukuoka Prefecture
NK 06 Kashii-Kaenmae	香椎花園前	5.0		Higashi-ku, Fukuoka	Fukuoka Prefecture
NK 07 Tōnoharu	唐の原	6.1		Higashi-ku, Fukuoka	Fukuoka Prefecture
NK 08 Wajiro	和白	7.2	JD Kashii Line	Higashi-ku, Fukuoka	Fukuoka Prefecture
NK 09 Mitoma	三苫	9.0		Higashi-ku, Fukuoka	Fukuoka Prefecture
NK 10 Nishitetsu Shingū	西鉄新宮	11.0		Shingū	Fukuoka Prefecture

== History ==
The Hakata Bay Railway opened the 1,435 mm (4 ft 8 1/2 in) gauge Shinhakata to Wajiro line in 1924, and extended the line to Miyajidake the following year. The line was electrified at 1,500 V DC in 1929. The company merged with the Nishi-Nippon Railway in 1942. The 1 km section from Miyajidake to Tsuyazaki opened in 1951, and in 1954 the line was re-gauged to 1,067 mm (3 ft 6 in) and connected to the Fukuoka line.

The line was grade separated over the JR Kashii Line at Wajiro Station in 1966, and CTC signalling was commissioned in 1978.

In 1986, the Shinhakata to Kaizuka section was closed and replaced by the Fukuoka City Subway Hakozaki Line.

In 2007, the 10 km Nishitetsu Shingū to Tsuyazaki section closed due to declining patronage.
