= Chihaya Station =

Railway station in Fukuoka, Japan

JA 03 Chihaya Station 千早駅
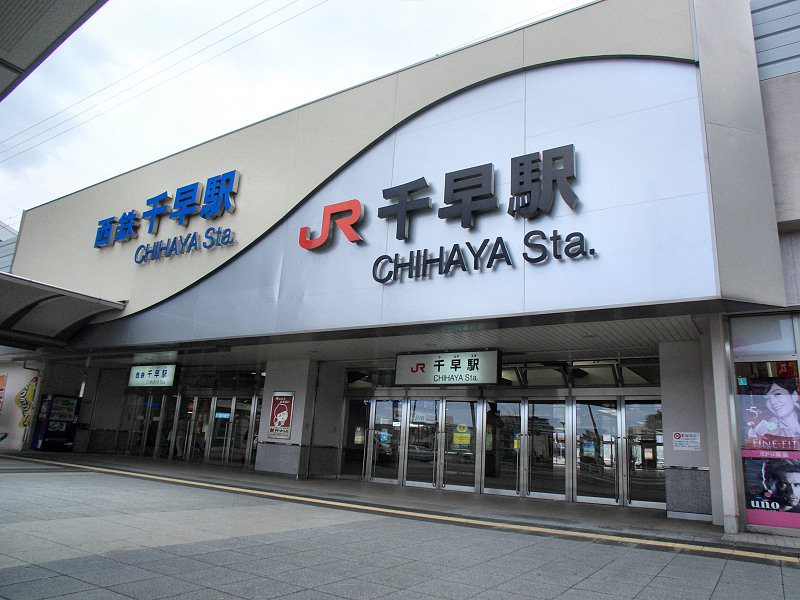
- West Entrance of Chihaya Station

General information
- Location: 4-chōme-94 Chihaya, Higashi-ku, Fukuoka-shi, Fukuoka-ken 813-0044; Japan
- Coordinates: 33°38′56.70″N 130°26′25.86″E
- Operator: Nishitetsu; JR Kyushu
- Lines: ■ Nishitetsu Kaizuka Line; JA Kagoshima Main Line
- Distance: 71.0 km Mojikō
- Platforms: 3 island platforms

Other information
- Status: Staffed (Midori no Madoguchi)
- Website: Official website

History
- Opened: 15 June 1951
- Former names: Nakano

Passengers
- FY2020: 10,452 (JR)
- Rank: 9th (among JR Kyushu stations)

Services
Preceding station	Nishitetsu	Following station
Najima towards Kaizuka	Kaizuka Line	Kashii-Miyamae towards Nishitetsu Shingū
Preceding station	JR Kyushu	Following station
Hakozaki towards Kagoshima	Kagoshima Main Line Local	Kashii towards Mojikō
Location
- Location within Fukuoka Prefecture Location within Japan

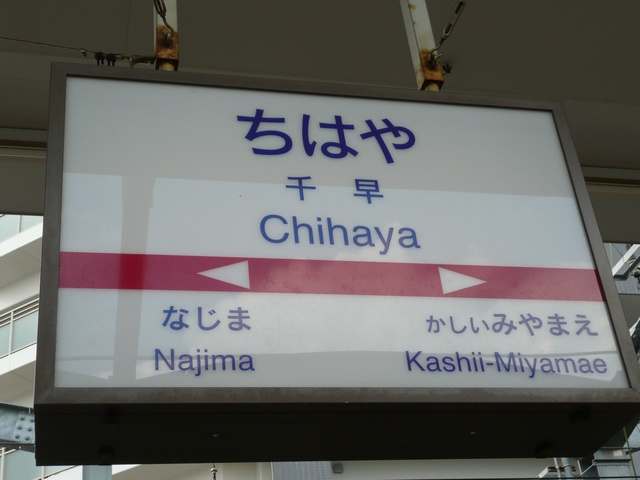
A sign at Nishitetsu Chihaya Station

Chihaya Station (千早駅, Chihaya-eki) is a two-part passenger railway station located in Higashi-ku, Fukuoka, Japan. Half of the station is operated by JR Kyushu, and the other half is operated by the private transportation company Nishi-Nippon Railroad (Nishitetsu) as Nishitetsu Chihaya Station (西鉄千早駅, Nishitetsu-Chihaya-eki).

== Lines ==
The JR station is served by the Kagoshima Main Line and is located 71.0 km from the starting point of the line at Mojikō. The Nishitetsu station is served by the Kaizuka Line and is 2.5 kilometers from the starting point of that line at Kaizuka.

== Station layout ==
The JR station consists of two elevated island platforms and 4 tracks, with the station building underneath. The station has a Midori no Madoguchi staffed ticket office. The adjacent Nishitetsu station has one elevated island platform.

=== Platforms ===
1, 2	■ JA Kagoshima Main Line	for Kurosaki and Kokura
3, 4	■ JA Kagoshima Main Line	for Hakata and Kurume

1	■ ■ Nishitetsu Kaizuka Line	for Nishitetsu Kashii and Nishitetsu Shingū
2	■ ■ Nishitetsu Kaizuka Line	for Kaizuka

== History ==
There had been a Nishitetsu station named Nakano Station (名香野駅, Nakano-eki) since 1951. In the course of the redevelopment of a former railway yard in the area, the station was relocated and upgraded to a joint station for Nishitetsu and JR. The JR station was opened in 2003 and the Nishitetsu station was renamed and rebuilt in 2004. The original location of Nakano Station is a few blocks away from the present station.

- June 15, 1951 - Nishitetsu opens Nakano Station.
- July 7, 2003 - JR Kyushu opens Chihaya station.
- August 2, 2004 - Nishitetsu relocates Nakano Station and renames it Nishitetsu Chihaya Station. (Originally scheduled for August 1, but postponed because of an approaching typhoon.)

== Passenger statistics ==
In fiscal 2020, the JR station was used by an average of 10,452 passengers daily (boarding passengers only), and it ranked 9th among the busiest stations of JR Kyushu. During the same time, the Nishitetsu portion of the station served 4,920 passengers daily.

== Surrounding area ==
- Japan National Route 3
- Hakata High School
- Fukuoka City Tatara Junior High School

== See also ==
- List of railway stations in Japan
