= Uminonakamichi Nata Seawater Desalination Center =

Seawater desalination and osmotic power generation facility in Fukuoka, Japan

Uminonakamichi Nata Seawater Desalination Center (Japanese: 海の中道奈多海水淡水化センター), commonly known as Mamizupia, is a seawater desalination facility in Fukuoka, Japan. Operated by the Fukuoka District Waterworks Agency, the facility supplies freshwater to the Greater Fukuoka metropolitan area and is notable for integrating osmotic power generation technology with desalination operations.

== Background ==
The Uminonakamichi Nata Seawater Desalination Center was established to address water shortages in the Greater Fukuoka metropolitan area. Although the region has a population of approximately 2.6 million people, it lacks major rivers and has historically faced recurring water supply problems. The desalination plant began operations in 2005. During the planning stages, engineers identified the environmental challenge posed by concentrated seawater produced during the desalination process. The concentrated brine contains roughly 8% salt, compared to approximately 3.5% in ordinary seawater. Direct discharge into the ocean was considered potentially harmful to marine ecosystems.

Initially, the concentrated seawater was diluted using discharge water from a nearby sewage treatment plant before being released. Researchers later explored methods to utilize the byproduct for renewable energy production, leading to the development of an osmotic power generation system.

The plant was developed with the involvement of Kyowakiden Industry Co., Ltd., a Japanese water processing plant engineering company. An official opening ceremony for the osmotic power generation facility was held on 5 August 2025.

== Facility ==
Mamizupia power plant uses reverse osmosis desalination technology in which seawater is pressurized and passed through semi-permeable membranes to separate freshwater from salt and impurities.

The facility is connected to a nearby sewage treatment plant, enabling the use of treated wastewater in its osmotic power generation process. Osmotic power generation uses the difference in salt concentration between concentrated seawater and treated sewage water. When separated by an osmotic membrane, water naturally moves toward the higher salt concentration side, creating pressure that drives turbines connected to generators.

The osmotic power generation system operates continuously and is largely unaffected by weather conditions. The system has an estimated utilization rate of around 90%.

== Capacity ==
The plant desalinates about 50,000 cubic meters of freshwater per day, which is used to supply water for around 250,000 people in the Greater Fukuoka area.

The osmotic power generation facility currently generates approximately 110 kW of electricity using around 20,000 cubic meters of water per day. Annual electricity generation is estimated at 880,000 kWh.

== See also ==
- Desalination
- Reverse osmosis
- Osmotic power
- Renewable energy in Japan
