= Nishitetsu Shingū Station =

Railway station in Shingū, Fukuoka Prefecture, Japan

Nishitetsu Shingū Station 西鉄新宮駅
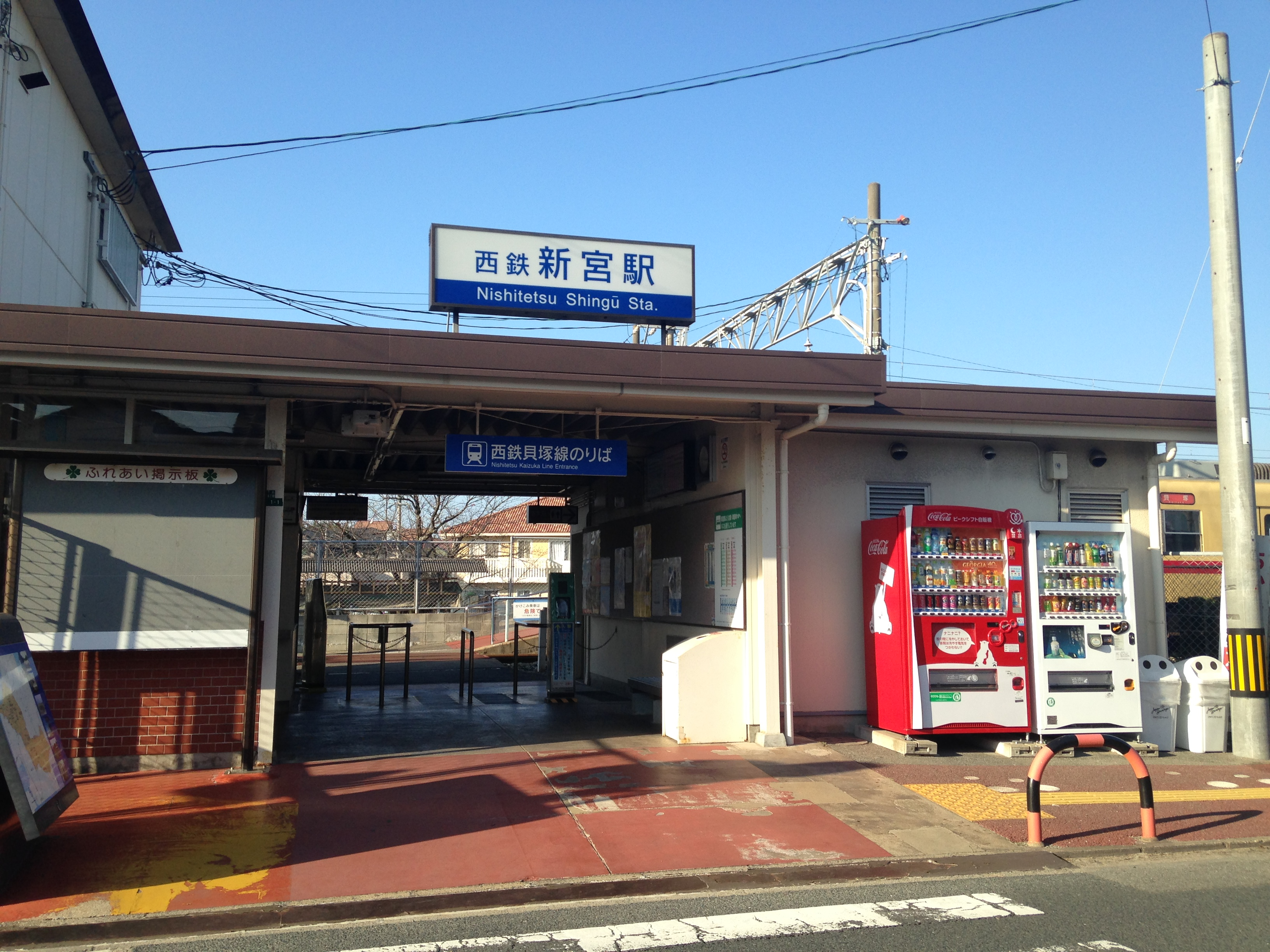
- Nishitetsu Shingū Station in 2015

General information
- Location: 5-chome Shimonofu, Shingū-sho, Kasuya-gun, Fukuoka-ken 811-0112; Japan
- Coordinates: 33°42′50.01″N 130°26′12.12″E
- Operator: Nishi-Nippon Railroad
- Line: ■ Nishitetsu Kaizuka Line
- Distance: 11.0 km from Kaizuka
- Platforms: 1 island platform

Construction
- Structure type: At-grade

Other information
- Status: Staffed
- Station code: NK10
- Website: Official website

History
- Opened: 1 July 1925
- Former names: Shingū Port (to 1950)

Passengers
- FY2022: 1364

Services
Preceding station	Nishitetsu	Following station
Mitoma towards Kaizuka	Kaizuka Line	Terminus
Location
- Location within Fukuoka Prefecture Location within Japan

Nishitetsu Shingū Station (西鉄新宮駅, Nishitetsu-Shingū-eki) is a passenger railway station located in the town of Shingū, Fukuoka, Japan. It is operated by the private transportation company Nishi-Nippon Railroad (NNR), and has station number NK10.

== Lines ==
The station is the terminus of the Nishitetsu Kaizuka Line and is 11.0 kilometers from the opposing terminus of the line at Kaizuka.

== Station layout ==
The station is above ground level with an island platform and two tracks. It is connected to the station building by a level crossing. The station is staffed.

== Platforms ==
1, 2	■ Nishitetsu Kaizuka Line	for Wajiro, Chihaya and Kaizuka

== History ==
The station opened on 1 July 1925 as Shingū Port Station (新宮港駅) on the Hakata Bay Railway Steamship Company. The company merged with the Kyushu Electric Railway (later Nishitetsu) on 19 September 1942. The station was renamed on 15 May 1950.

== Passenger statistics ==
In fiscal 2022, the station was used by 1364 passengers daily.

== Surrounding area ==
- Shingu Town Hall
- Fukuoka Prefectural Shingu High School
- Fukuoka Prefectural Fukuoka Special Needs School
- Shingu Municipal Shingu Junior High School
- Shingu Municipal Shingu Elementary School

== See also ==
- List of railway stations in Japan
