= Kaizuka Station (Fukuoka) =

Railway and metro station in Fukuoka, Japan

NK 01 H07 Kaizuka Station 貝塚駅
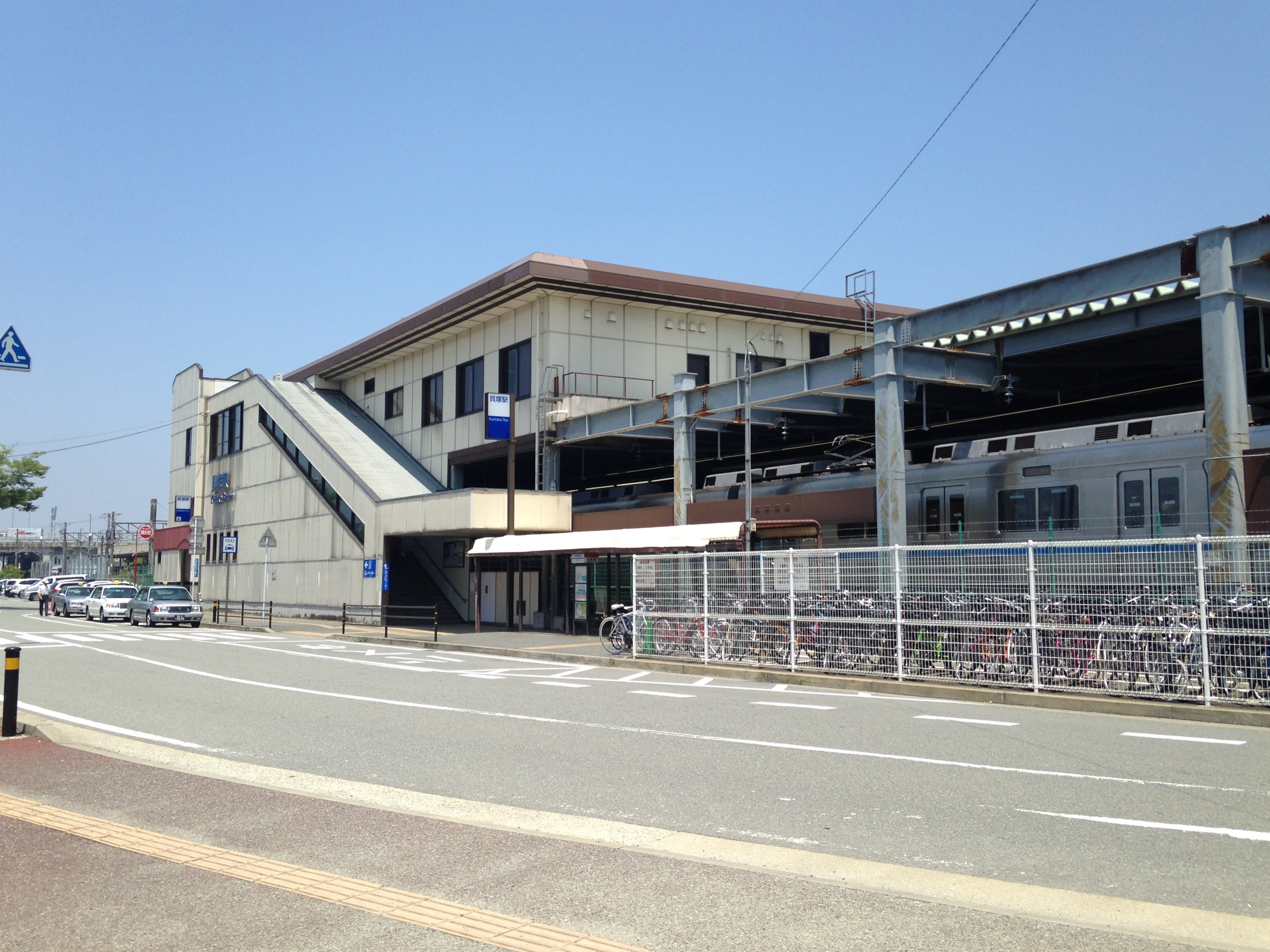
- Kaizuka Station, May 2016

General information
- Location: 7-chōme-1-1 Hakozaki, Higashi-ku, Fukuoka-shi, Fukuoka-ken 812-0053; Japan
- Coordinates: 33°37′56″N 130°25′32″E
- Operator: Nishi-Nippon Railroad; Fukuoka City Subway
- Line: ■ Nishitetsu Kaizuka Line: Hakozaki Line
- Distance: 11.0 km to Nishitetsu Shingū; 12.8 km to Meinohama
- Platforms: 2 island platforms

Other information
- Station code: H07, NK01
- Website: Official website

History
- Opened: 20 April 1950
- Former names: Nishitetsu Tatara (to 1950); Keirinjō-mae (to 1954)

Passengers
- FY2022: 16,171 (NNR); 9975 (Fukuoka Subway)

Services
| Preceding station | Fukuoka City Subway | Following station |
|---|---|---|
| Hakozaki-Kyūdai-mae H06 towards Nakasu-Kawabata | Hakozaki Line | Terminus |
| Preceding station | Nishitetsu | Following station |
| Terminus | Kaizuka Line | Najima towards Nishitetsu Shingū |
Location
- Location within Fukuoka Prefecture Location within Japan

Kaizuka Station (貝塚駅, Kaizuka-eki) is a passenger railway station located in Higashi-ku, Fukuoka Fukuoka Prefecture, Japan. The above-ground portion is operated by the private transportation company Nishi-Nippon Railroad (NNR), and has station number NK01 and the underground portion is operated by the Fukuoka City Subway.

== Lines ==
The above-ground station is the northern terminus of the 11.0 kilometer Nishitetsu Kaizuka Line to Nishitetsu Shingū. The underground portion is served by the Fukuoka City Subway Hakozaki Line and is 4.7 kilometers from Nakasu-Kawabata and 12.8 kilometers from Meinohama.

== Station layout ==
The station consists of two island platforms. The station is staffed. The subway station's symbol mark is a brown conch which because Kaizuka's initials Chinese character 貝 means seashell and spiral is suggestive of transportation's junction.

== Platforms ==
| 1, 2 | ■ Hakozaki Line | for Nakasu-Kawabata and Meinohama |
| 1, 2 | ■ Nishitetsu Kaizuka Line | for Nishitetsu Shingū |

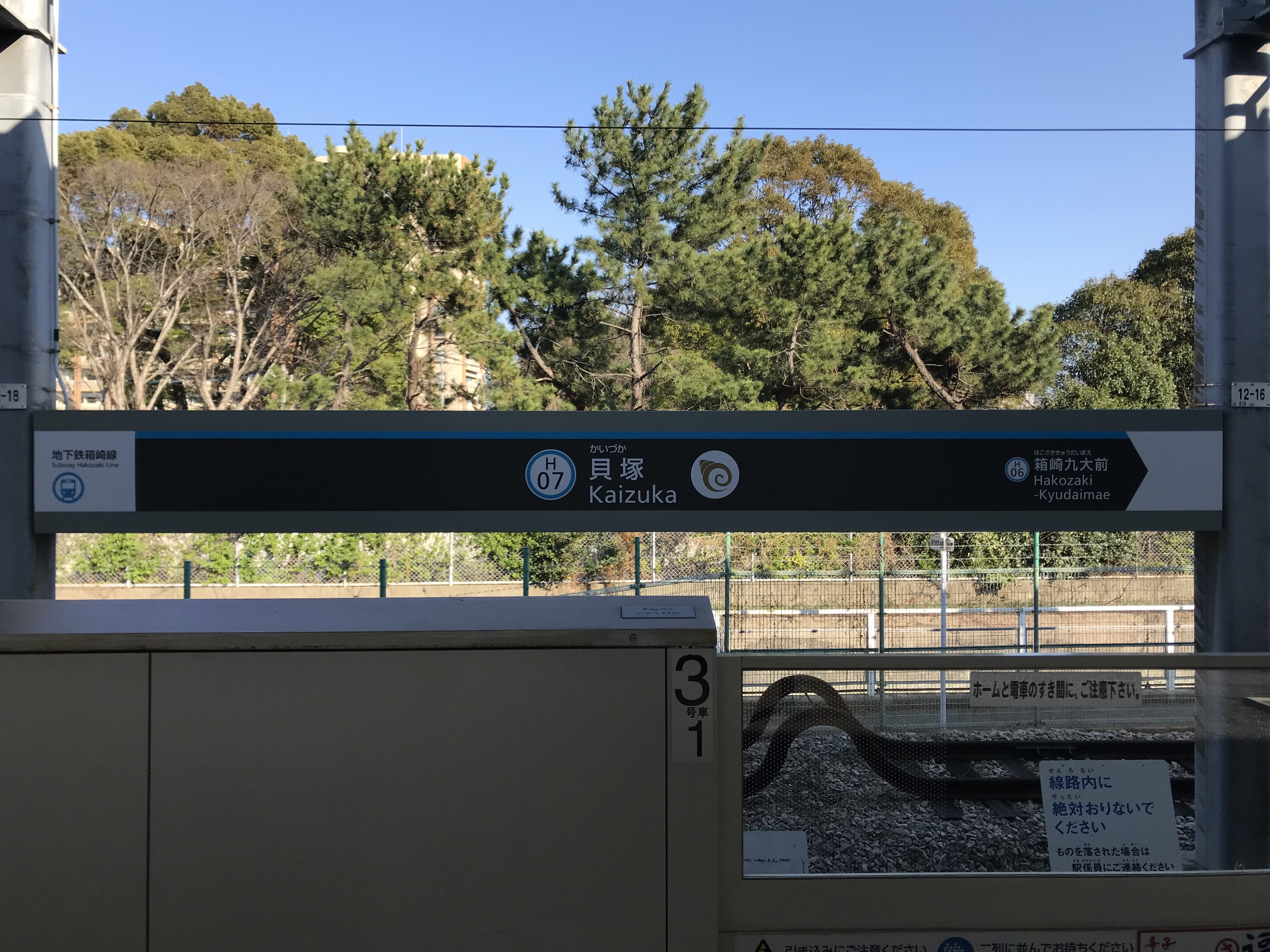
Subway station's running in board

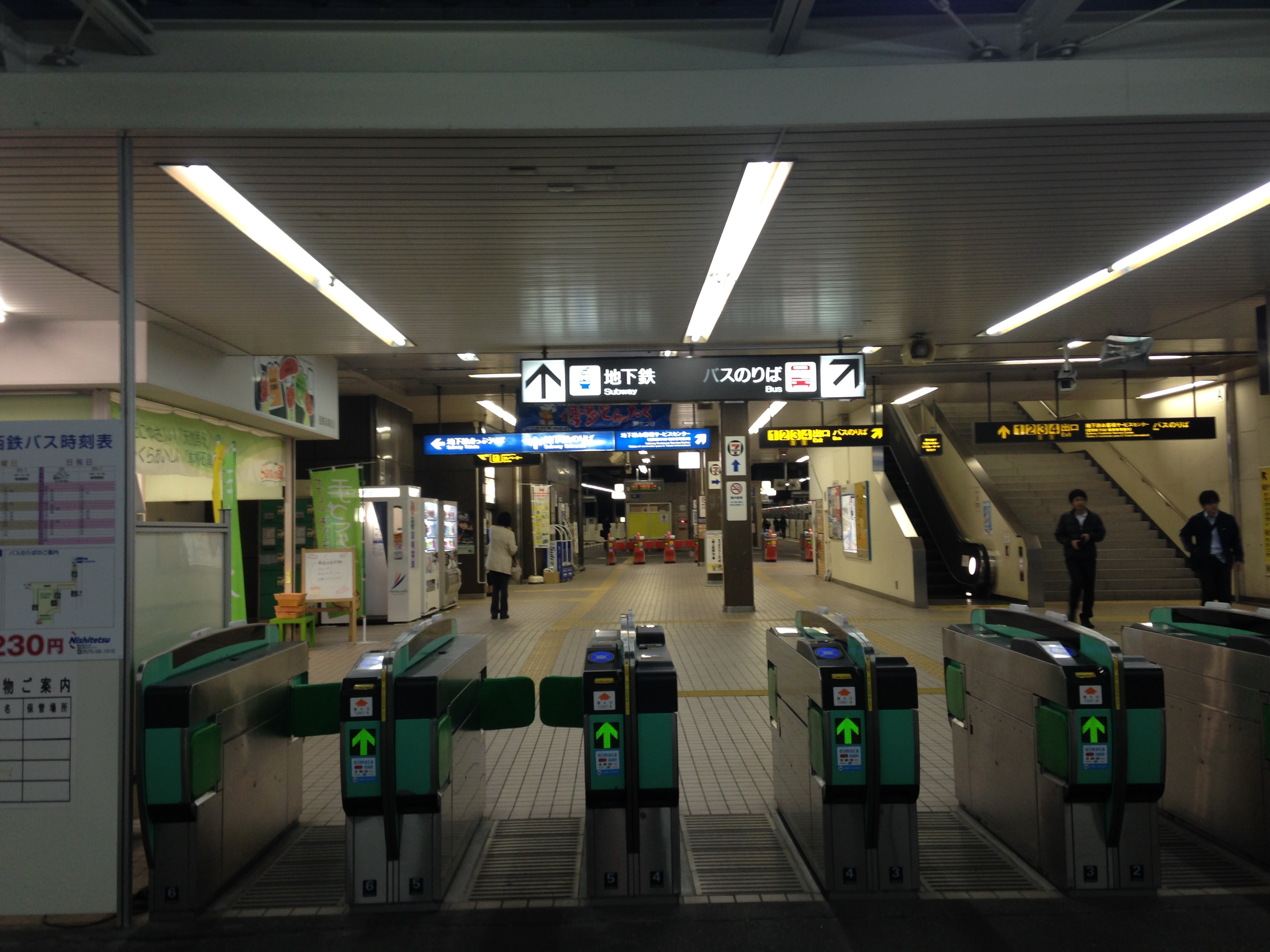
View of Kaizuka Station from platform of Nishitetsu Kaizuka Line

== History ==
A signal stop was established on this location on 4 February 1935. It was promoted to a full station on 20 April 1950 as Nishitetsu Tatara Station (西鉄多々良駅). It was renamed Keirinjō-mae Station (競輪場前駅) on 5 March 1954. Due to the closure of the Fukuoka Velodrome, the name was changed to Kaizuka Station on 1 November 1962. The subway station opened on 1 July 2004.

== Passenger statistics ==
In fiscal 2022, the NNR portion station was used by 16,171 passengers daily. During the same period, the Fukuoka City Subway portion of the station was used by 9975 passengers daily.

== Surrounding area ==
Condominiums are prominent around the station, including the Kaizuka housing complex.

- Japan National Route 3

== See also ==
- List of railway stations in Japan
