= Higashi-ku, Fukuoka =

Higashiii 東区
- Ward
- Higashi Ward
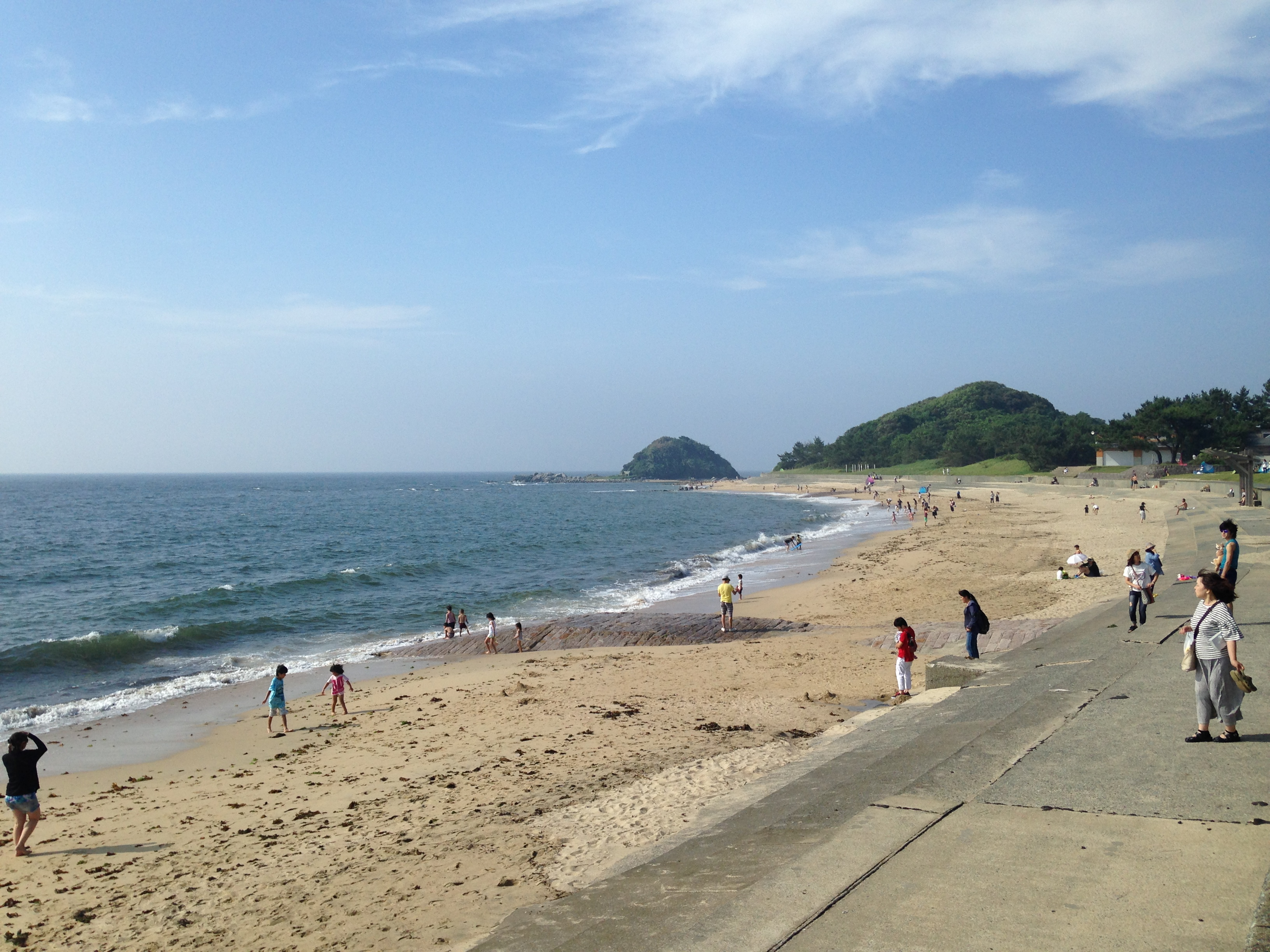
- Beach on Shika Island

- Flag Seal

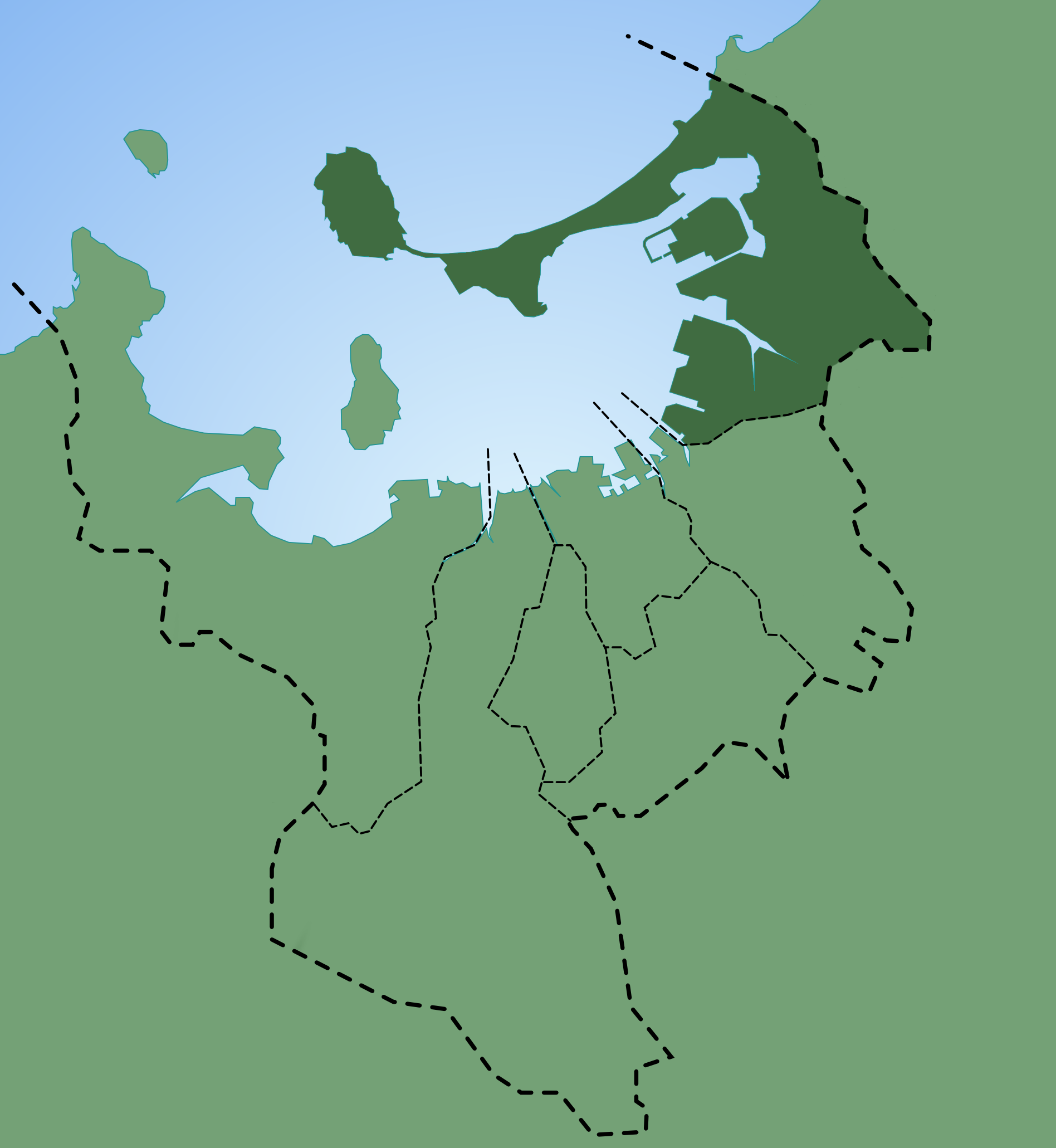
- Location of Higashi-ku in Fukuoka City

- Coordinates: 33°36′59″N 130°25′21″E
- Country: Japan
- Region: Kyushu
- Prefecture: Fukuoka
- City: Fukuoka
- Established: 1 April 1972

Area
  - Total: 68.36 km^{2} (26.39 sq mi)

Population (1 March 2012)
  - Total: 296,576
  - Density: 4,388.44/km^{2} (11,366.0/sq mi)
- Time zone: UTC+9 (Japan Standard Time)
- Postal Number: 812-8653
- Address: 2-54-1 Hakozaki, Higashi-ku, Fukuoka-shi, Fukuoka-ken
- Telephone Number: 092-631-2131
- Website: www.city.fukuoka.lg.jp/higashi/index.html (in Japanese)

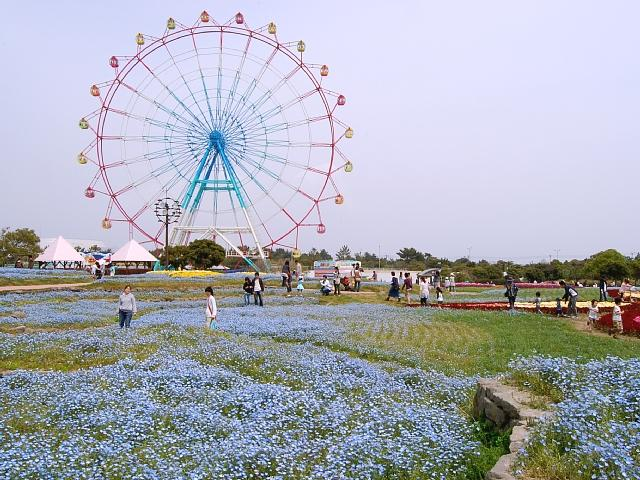
Umi-no-nakamichi Seaside Park

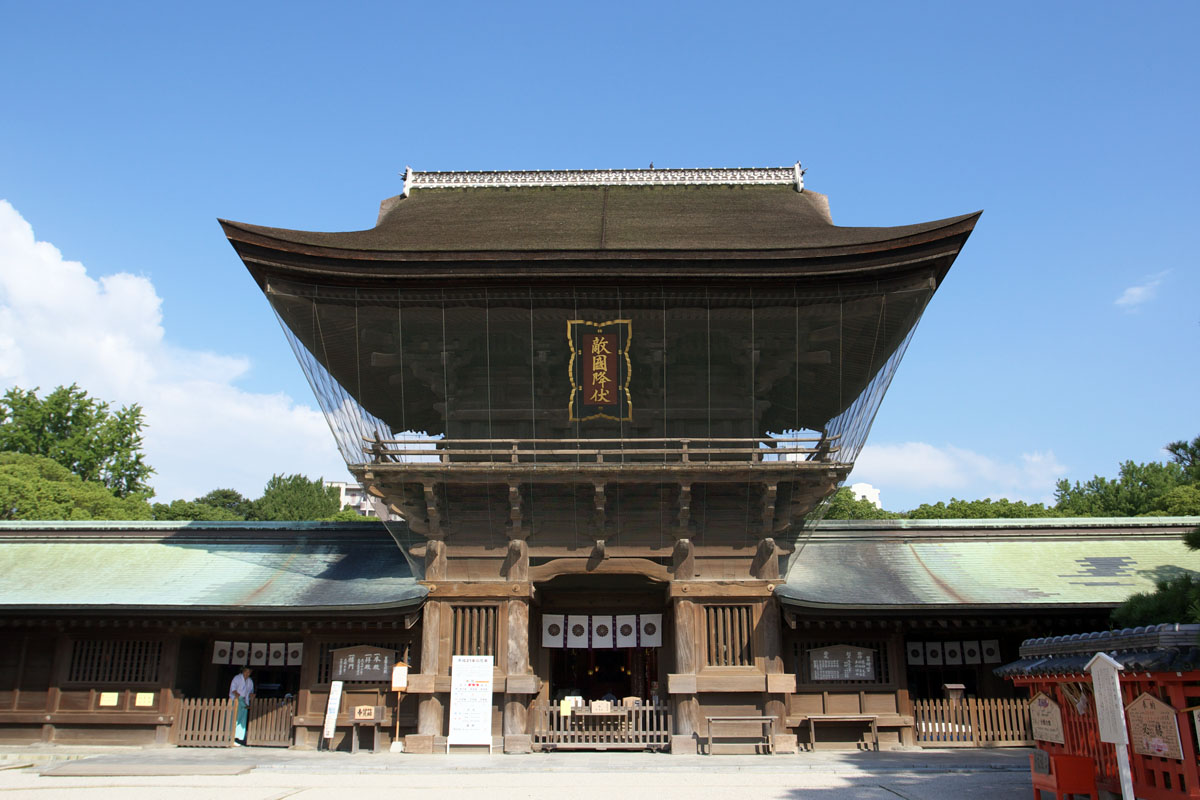
Hakozakigu

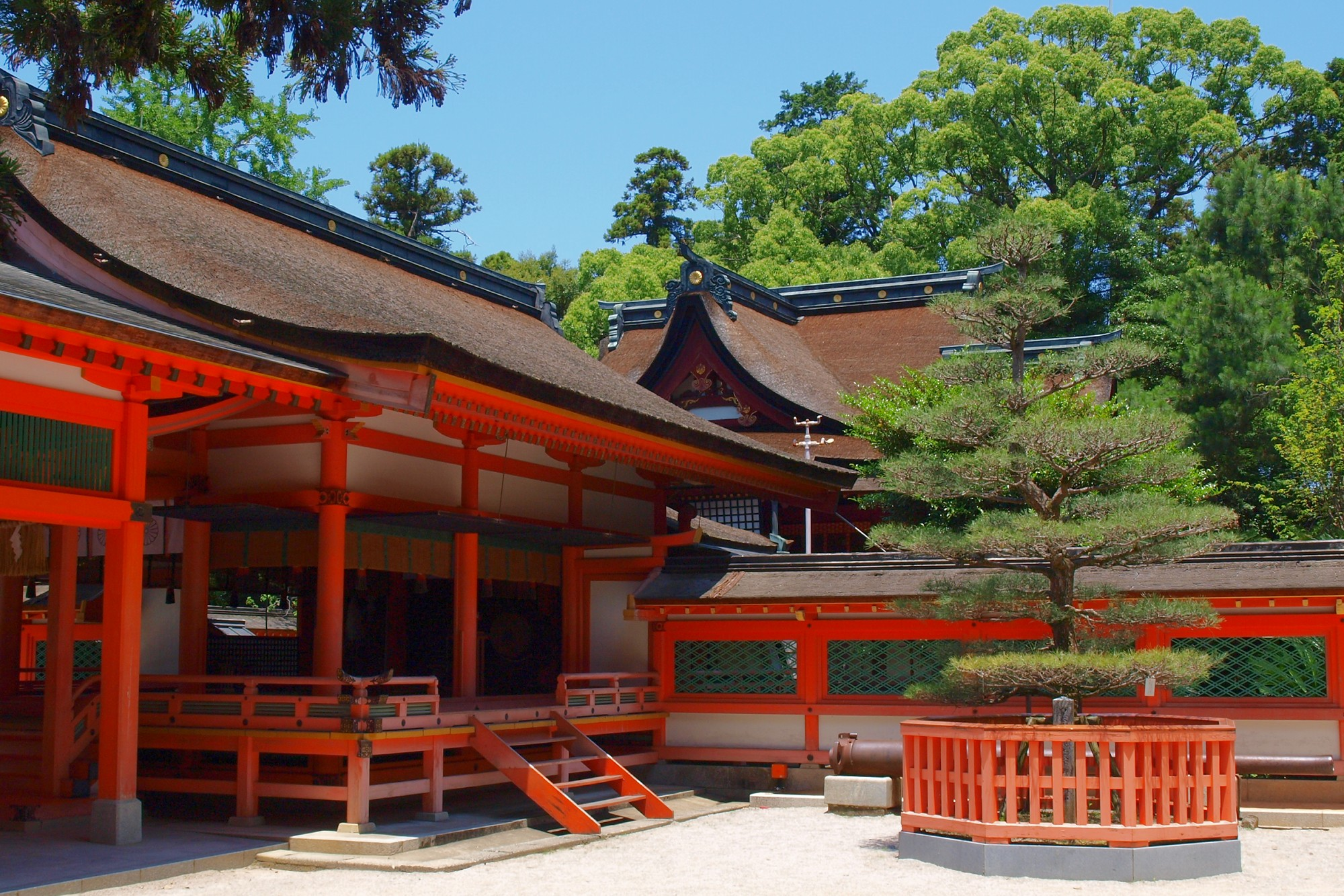
Kashii-gu

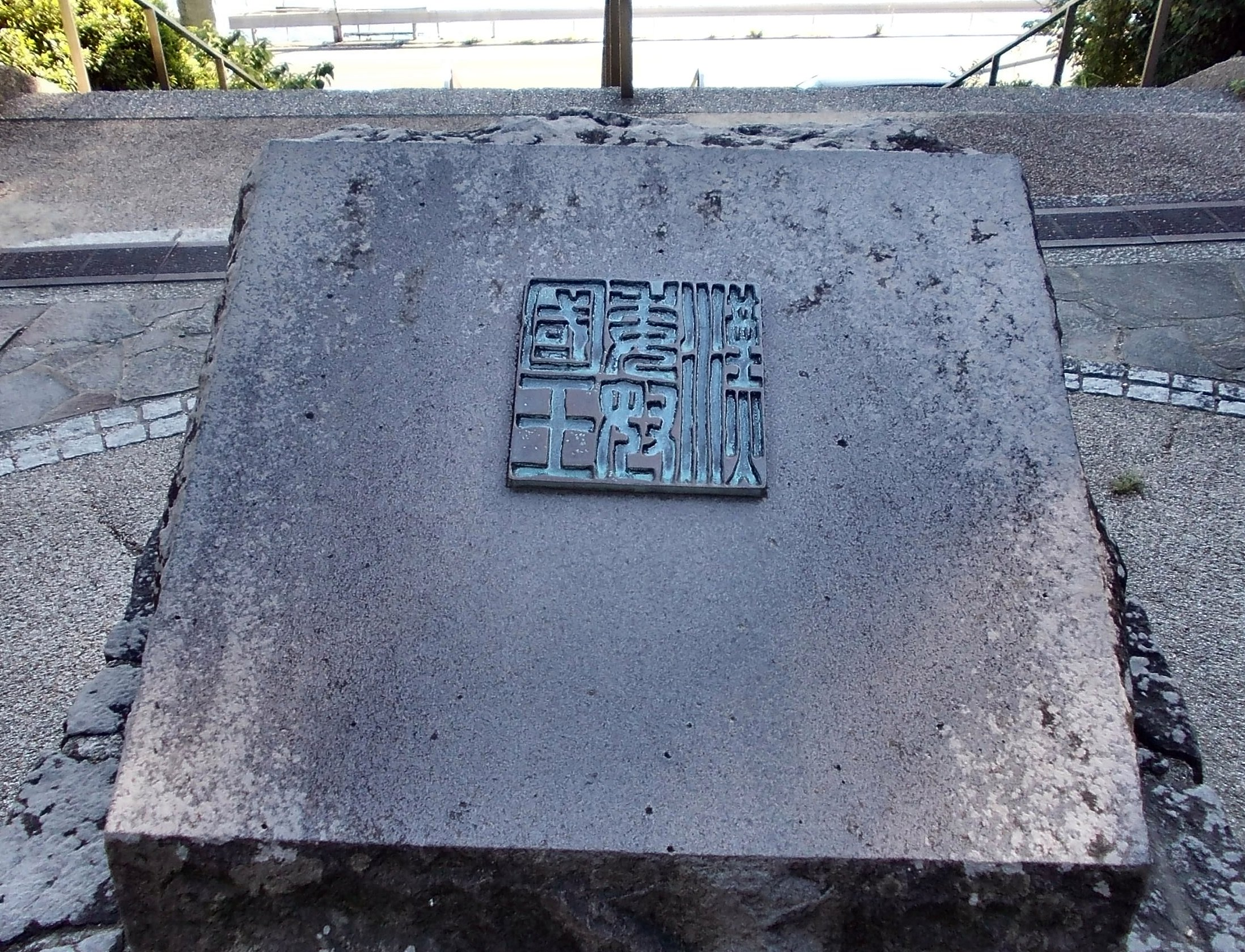
A golden block seal of Han's Na regional king in Kinin Park, Shika Island

Higashi-ku (東区) is one of the seven wards of Fukuoka in Japan. As of 1 March 2012, it has a population of 296,576, with 136,133 households, and an area of 66.68 km^{2}. Its name literally means "east ward".

Kashii is in this ward. It is south of neighbouring Shingū, Fukuoka. The Shika Island is connected to Umi no Nakamichi by a bridge.

The annual Fukuoka International Cross Country meeting takes place in this ward.

== Places within Higashi-ku ==
- Maidashi

== Education ==
=== Colleges and universities ===
- Kyushu University - Maidashi campus (Kyushu University Academic Medical Center), Hakozaki campus
- Fukuoka Institute of Technology

=== Primary and secondary schools ===
The ward has a North Korean school, Fukuoka Korean Elementary School (福岡朝鮮初級学校).

== Parks ==
There are approximately 400 public parks in Higashi-ku. One of these is Maidashi Park (馬出緑地) in Maidashi district. Set in Fukuoka's greenbelt, the park was built on land formerly occupied by the Nishitetsu Miyajidake Line, which was sold to the city in 1980.

== Facilities ==
=== Commerce ===
- Island City, Fukuoka
  - Island Tower Sky Club
- Marine World Uminonakamichi

== Religion ==
- Buddhism
  - Honbutsu-ji (Nichiren Shōshū)
- Christianity
  - Hakozaki Catholic Church
- Islam
  - Fukuoka Mosque
- Shinto
  - Hakozaki Shrine
  - Kashii-gū

== See also ==
- Coca-Cola Red Sparks
