= King of Na gold seal =

Chinese gold seal discovered in Japan

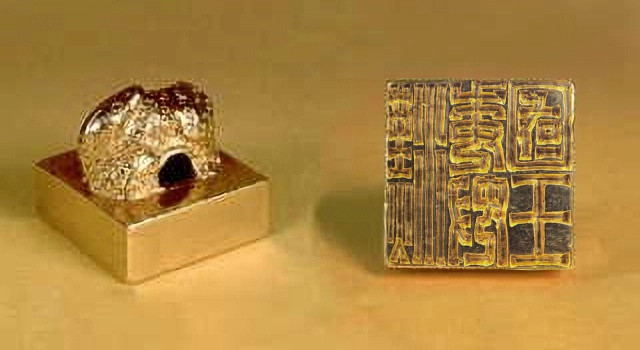
Composite image showing two views of the seal

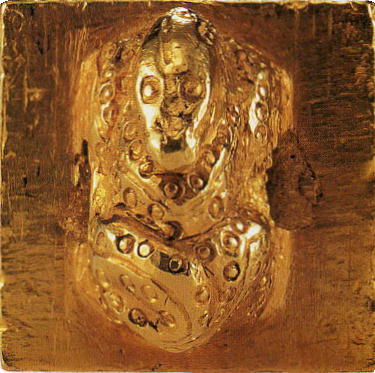
Top view of the snake knob

The King of Na gold seal (Japanese: 漢委奴国王印) is a Chinese seal made of solid gold designated as a National Treasure of Japan, discovered in 1784 on Shikanoshima Island in Fukuoka Prefecture, Kyushu, southern Japan. The seal is believed to have been cast during Eastern Han dynasty and bestowed by Emperor Guangwu upon a diplomatic envoy visiting from the Yayoi Na state in the year 57 AD, as an official authentication of the state as a tributary state of China. The five Chinese characters appearing on the gold seal (in small seal script) read as "King of the Wa Na State, (vassal of the) Han".

The seal is currently in the collection of the Fukuoka City Museum in Fukuoka. It is the first known textual record of Japan as a country, and is included in Japanese history books as a cultural asset that indicates how Japan came into being as a political entity. It is also the earliest evidence of diplomatic contact in the history of China–Japan relations.

== Appearance ==
The seal is composed of gold of 95% purity. It is made up of a square base, with the seal itself on the bottom face, and a handle on top of the base in the shape of a snake. It has a mass of 108.729 grams (3.8353 oz). The total height from base to handle is 2.236 centimetres (0.880 in). The base of the seal averages 2.347 centimetres (0.924 in) on a side. This dimension roughly corresponds to the traditional Chinese standard unit of length of one cun, as used in the Later Han dynasty (about 2.304 centimetres [0.907 in]).

=== Characters engraved on the seal ===
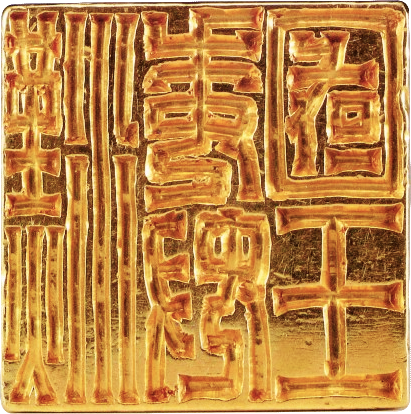
Base of seal (left), together with its imprint (right). The imprint is read from right to left, top to bottom.

The five characters engraved on the seal are (in the order in which they are to be read):

漢委奴國王

The meanings of these characters (in the context of this seal) are: "Han" (referring to the Han dynasty of China), "Wa" (an ancient name for Japan), "Na" (an ancient kingdom / state within Japan), "state / country", and "ruler." Altogether, the meaning of the seal inscription is: "(seal of) the King of the Na state of the Wa [vassal?] of the Han dynasty".

The character 委 is a loan for 倭 (Wa), an instance of the common practice of loaning characters in Classical Chinese. The characters are engraved in the seal script style.

Okazaki Takashi notes that the character for Han indicates that Na was an external subject state of Han.

== History ==
The seal has been judged to be the one described in the Book of the Later Han, a Chinese chronicle of the history of the Eastern Han dynasty. According to the chronicle, the Chinese Emperor Guangwu conferred the seal on a diplomatic official visiting from Japan.

=== Contemporary description of conferral ===
The following is the original Chinese text from the chronicle:

建武中元二年，倭奴國奉貢朝賀，使人自稱大夫，倭國之極南界也。光武賜以印綬。

This passage can be translated into English as:

"In the 2nd year of the jianwu zhongyuan reign period [AD 57], the Na state of Wa sent an envoy with tribute. The envoy introduced himself as a high official. The state lies in the far south of Wa. [Emperor] Guangwu bestowed on him a seal with a tassel."

During the Han dynasty, similar seals were bestowed on other regional sovereigns, in an attempt by the dynasty to bring these sovereigns into the Han ruling order.

The seal was accompanied by a purple ribbon which usually indicates a Ranged Marquis.

=== Rediscovery ===
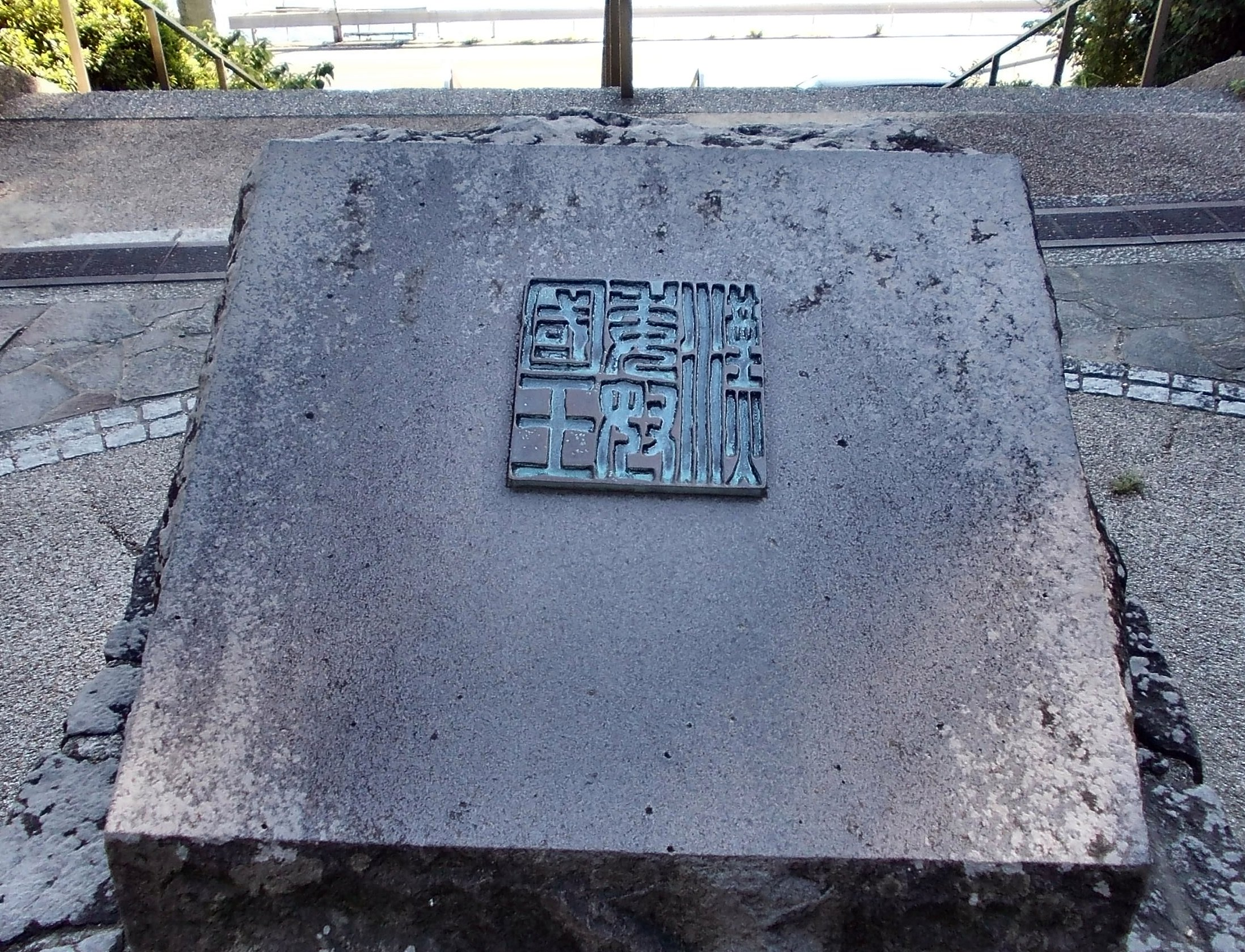
Commemorative monument near the site where the seal was uncovered in 1784

After being lost for an undetermined period of time, the seal was reportedly rediscovered on February 23, 1784, on Shika Island in Fukuoka Prefecture, Japan. According to contemporary reports, the seal was discovered by a farmer named Jinbei while repairing an irrigation ditch. It was found surrounded by stones forming a box-like structure around it. The stone above the seal required two adults to lift. After the rediscovery, Kamei Nanmei identified it, saving it from being melted down. The seal was kept by the Kuroda clan, rulers of the Fukuoka Domain, and was eventually donated by the Kuroda family to the city of Fukuoka in 1978.

Ever since its discovery, there have persistently been theories doubting its authenticity. During the Edo period, Confucians like Kamei argued for its authenticity as part of their efforts to tie Japanese history to China, while Kokugaku scholars denied its authenticity for the opposite effect. While this debate died out during the Meiji period, strong doubts were again raised during the Second Sino-Japanese War, as scholars examined period seals finding them to differ critically. Post-war archeology has led to the discovery of multiple similar seals, including one possibly originating from the same workshop. Still, there have been doubts, including if the Han possessed the metallurgical capability needed to produce the seal. Writing in 2024, Okimori Takuya writes that comparison to other seals produced at the same time has led to its authenticity to be widely accepted.

== See also ==
- King of Dian gold seal
- King of Nanyue gold seal
- List of National Treasures of Japan (archaeological materials)
