= Yayoi period =

Japanese historical period from 300 BC to AD 300

The Yayoi period (Japanese: 弥生時代, Hepburn: Yayoi jidai; c. 300 BC – AD 300) is one of the major historical periods of the Japanese archipelago. It is generally defined as the era between the beginning of food production in Japan and the emergence of keyhole-shaped burial mounds (前方後円墳, zenpō-kōen-fun). Chronologically, it spans from around the 10th century BC or 9th–8th century BC to the mid-3rd century AD.

Following the Jōmon period, which was characterized by a hunter-gatherer economy, the Yayoi period marked the transition to a productive economy based on wet-rice agriculture. In the latter half of the late Yayoi period (around the 1st century AD), large regional powers emerged throughout western Japan, including the Tokai and Hokuriku regions. By the end of the 2nd century, the political entity known as Wa-koku (倭国) had formed. It is generally considered that the Yayoi period transitioned into the Kofun period around the mid-3rd century, although the precise starting point of the Kofun period remains debated among scholars.

The name "Yayoi" was given in the 19th century by archaeologists, after artifacts and remains characteristic of this period were discovered in the Yayoi district of Tokyo. The most distinctive features of the Yayoi period are the emergence of a new style of pottery and the beginning of intensive rice cultivation in paddy fields. Yayoi pottery is more utilitarian and simpler in design compared to the decorative and intricate Jōmon pottery. With the advent of rice farming, people began to settle in one place for extended periods. Metallurgical techniques based on bronze and iron were introduced, and the inhabitants began to weave hemp, and to live in raised-floor dwellings with thatched roofs.

From an archaeological perspective, the term "Yayoi people" refers collectively to agricultural migrants from the Korean Peninsula and regions to the south, such as the South Pacific, who arrived during the Yayoi period. It does not denote a single ethnic group. These migrants gradually assimilated with the indigenous Jōmon population, forming the foundation of the modern Japanese people.

The degree of Yayoi cultural influence varied by region: Kyushu, Okinawa, and the Tōhoku region retained stronger Jōmon traits, while Kansai and Shikoku exhibited more pronounced Yayoi characteristics.

== Features ==
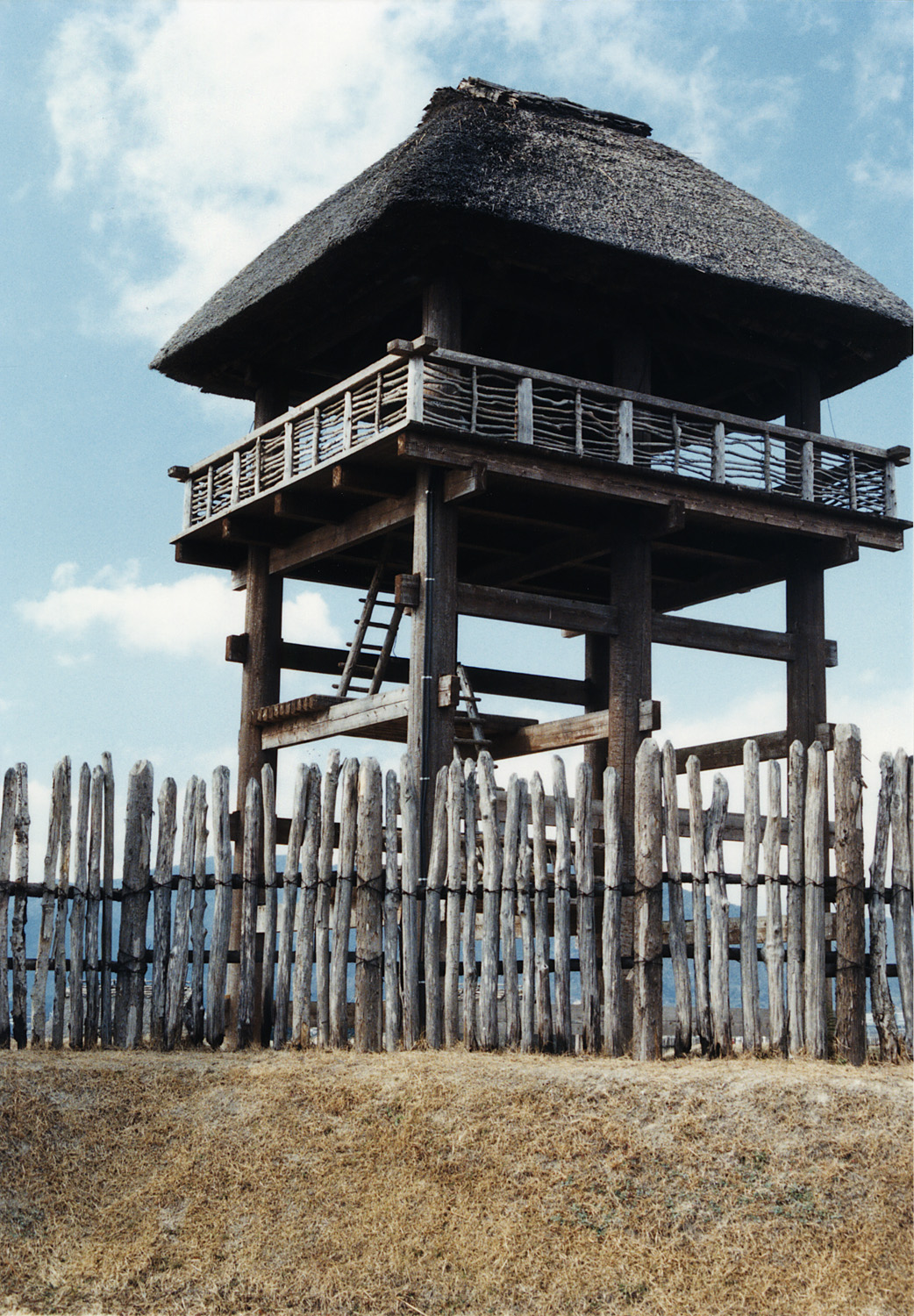
Yoshinogari site reconstruction

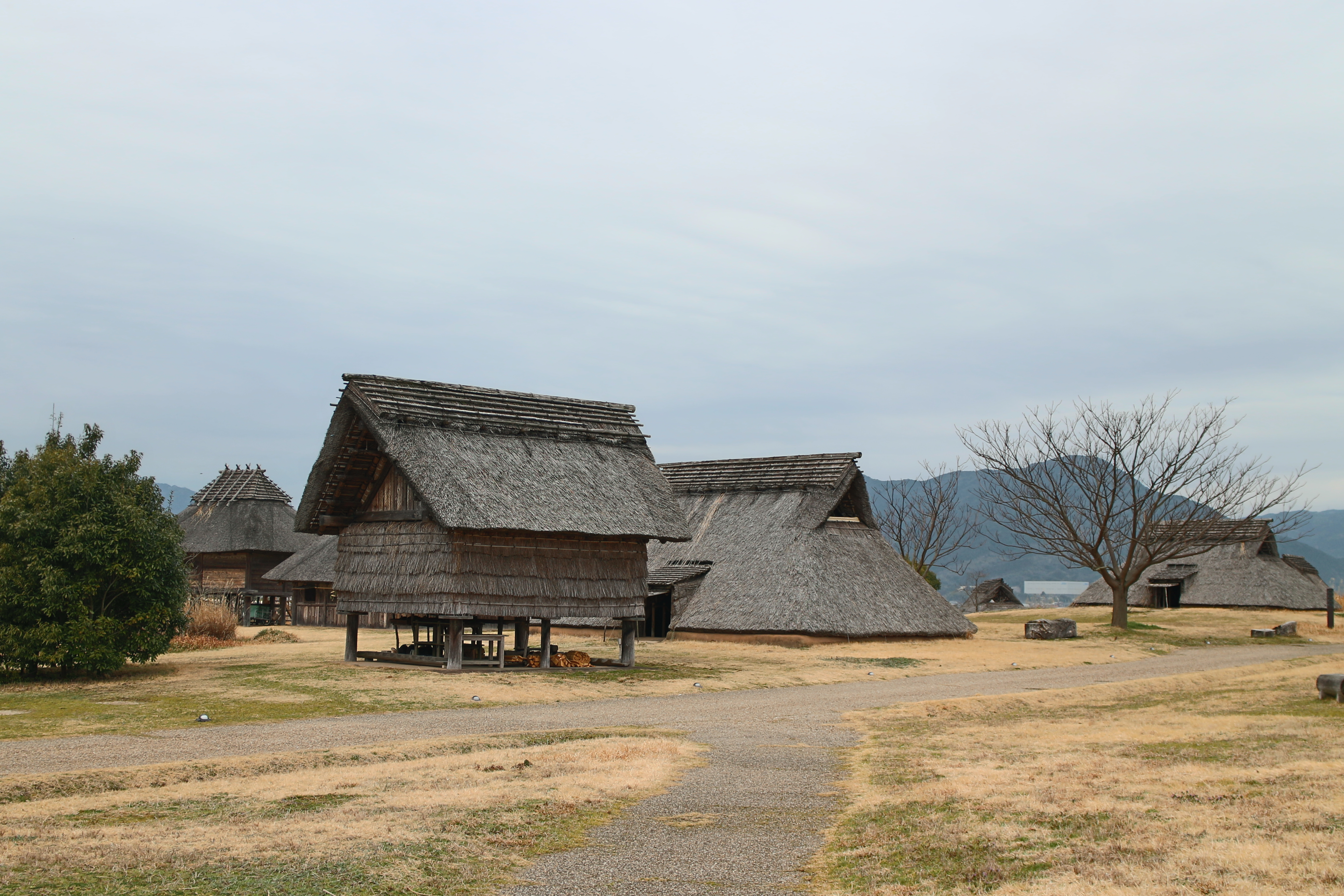
Reconstructed Yayoi-style dwellings at Yoshinogari

The Yayoi period is, generally, accepted to date from circa 300 BC to AD 300. However, although highly controversial, radiocarbon evidence, from organic samples attached to pottery shards, may suggest a date up to 500 years earlier, between ca. 1000 BC and 800 BC. During this period, Japan largely transitioned to a more settled, agricultural society, adopting methods of farming and crop production that were introduced to the country (initially in the Kyūshū region) from Korea, including millets (Panicum milliaceum and Setaria italica) and rice. Stone harvesting knives similar to those found on the Korean peninsula appear at the beginning of the Yayoi period.

The earliest archaeological evidence of the Yayoi Period is found on northern Kyūshū, though that is still debated. Yayoi culture quickly spread to the main island of Honshū, mixing with native Jōmon culture. The name Yayoi is borrowed from a location in Tokyo, where pottery of the Yayoi period was first found. Yayoi pottery was simply decorated and produced, using the same coiling technique previously used in Jōmon pottery. Yayoi craft specialists made bronze ceremonial bells (dōtaku), mirrors, and weapons. By the 1st century AD, Yayoi people began using iron agricultural tools and weapons.

As the Yayoi population increased, the society became more stratified and complex. They wove textiles, lived in permanent farming villages, and constructed buildings with wood and stone. They also accumulated wealth through land ownership and the storage of grain. Such factors promoted the development of distinct social classes. Contemporary Chinese sources described the people as having tattoos and other bodily markings which indicated differences in social status. Yayoi chiefs, in some parts of Kyūshū, appear to have sponsored, and politically manipulated, trade in bronze and other prestige objects. That was made possible by the introduction of an irrigated, wet-rice agriculture from the Yangtze estuary in southern China via the Ryukyu Islands or Korean Peninsula.

Direct comparisons between Jōmon and Yayoi skeletons show that the two peoples are noticeably distinguishable. The Jōmon tended to be shorter, with relatively longer forearms and lower legs, more deep-set eyes, shorter and wider faces, and much more pronounced facial topography. They also have strikingly raised brow ridges, noses, and nose bridges. Yayoi people, on the other hand, averaged 2.5–5 cm (0.98–1.97 in) taller, with shallow-set eyes, high and narrow faces, and flat brow ridges and noses. By the Kofun period, almost all skeletons excavated in Japan except those of the Ainu are of the Yayoi type with some having small Jōmon admixture, resembling those of modern-day Japanese.

== History ==
=== Origin of the Yayoi people ===
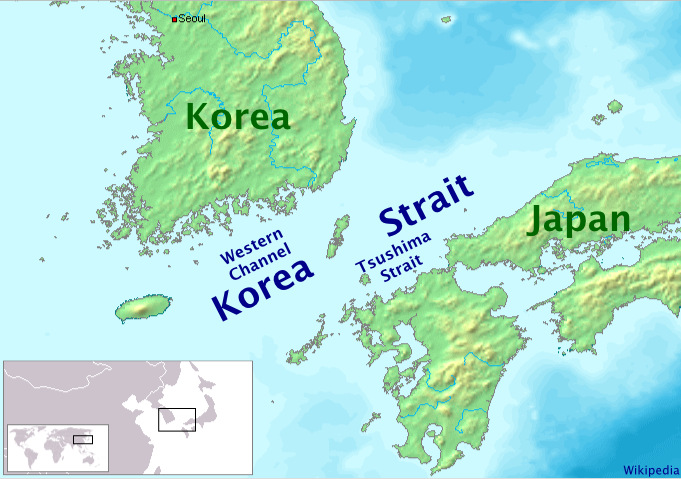
Northern Kyushu is the part of Japan closest to the Asian mainland.

The origin of Yayoi culture and the Yayoi people has long been debated. The earliest archaeological sites are Itazuke or Nabata in the northern part of Kyūshū. Contacts between fishing communities on this coast and the southern coast of Korea date from the Jōmon period, as witnessed by the exchange of trade items such as fishhooks and obsidian. During the Yayoi period, cultural features from Korea and China arrived in this area at various times over several centuries, and later spread to the south and east. This was a period of mixture between immigrants and the indigenous population, and between new cultural influences and existing practices.

Chinese influence was obvious in the bronze and copper weapons, dōkyō, dōtaku, as well as irrigated paddy rice cultivation. Three major symbols of Yayoi culture are the bronze mirror, the bronze sword, and the royal seal stone.

Between 1996 and 1999, a team led by Satoshi Yamaguchi, a researcher at Japan's National Museum of Nature and Science, compared Yayoi remains found in Japan's Yamaguchi and Fukuoka prefectures with those from China's coastal Jiangsu province and found many similarities between the Yayoi and the Jiangsu remains.

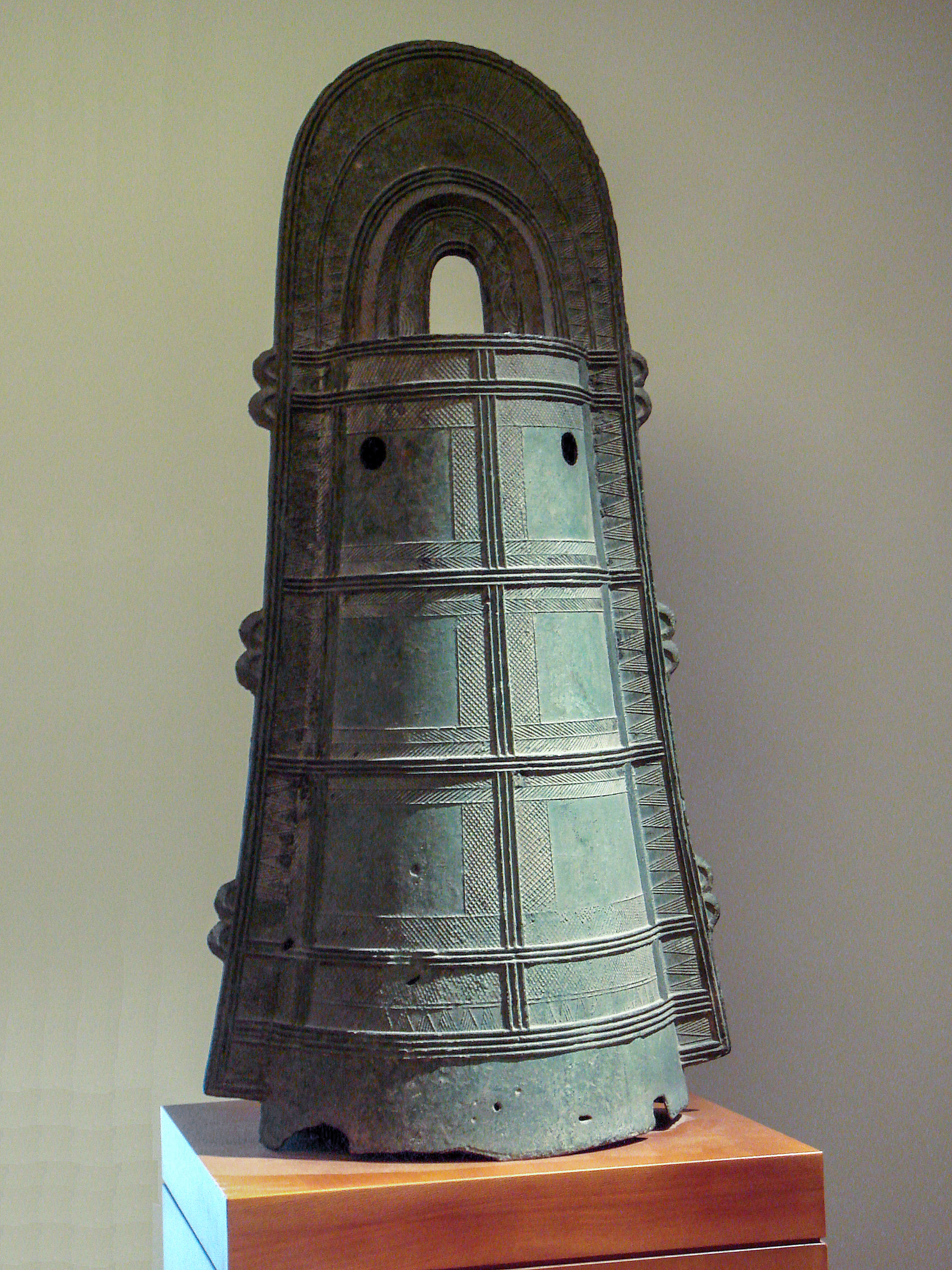
A Yayoi period dōtaku bell, 3rd century AD

Further links to the Korean Peninsula have been discovered, and several researchers have reported discoveries/evidence that strongly link the Yayoi culture to the southern part of the Korean Peninsula. Mark J. Hudson has cited archaeological evidence that included "bounded paddy fields, new types of polished stone tools, wooden farming implements, iron tools, weaving technology, ceramic storage jars, exterior bonding of clay coils in pottery fabrication, ditched settlements, domesticated pigs, and jawbone rituals". The migrant transfusion from the Korean peninsula gains strength because Yayoi culture began on the north coast of Kyūshū, where Japan is closest to Korea. Yayoi pottery, burial mounds, and food preservation were discovered to be very similar to the pottery of southern Korea.

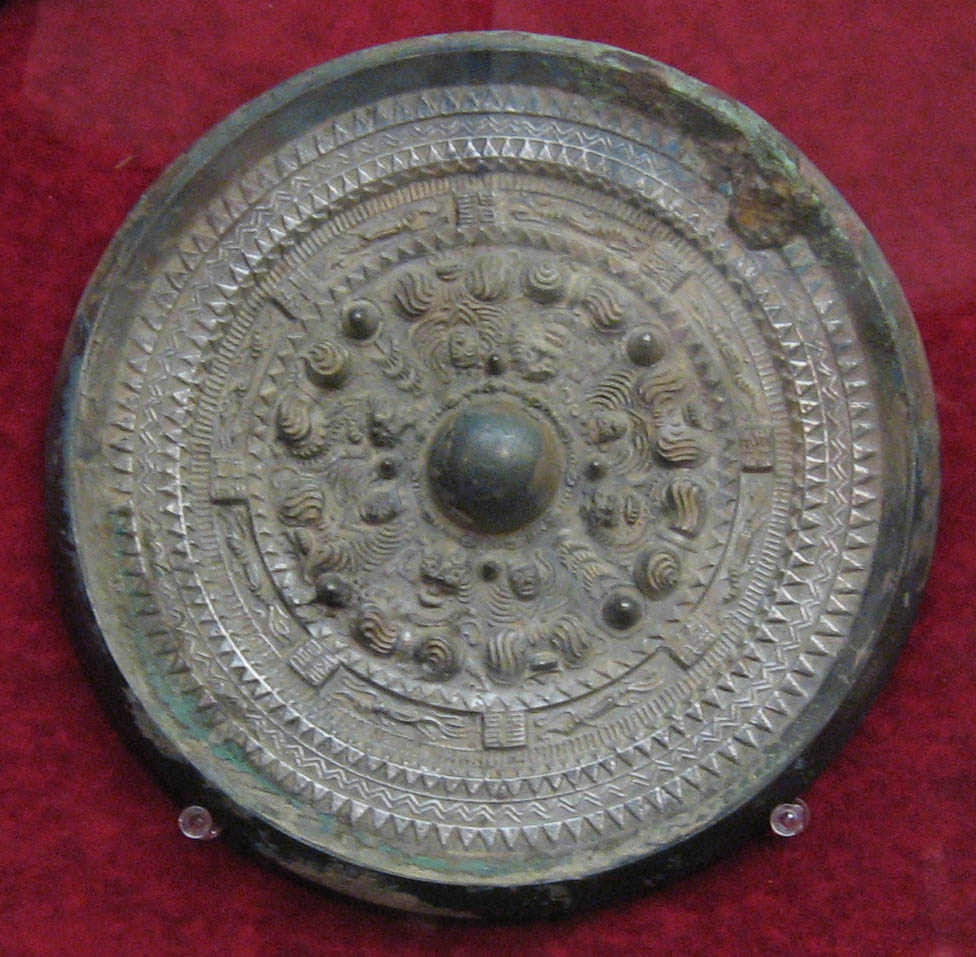
Shinju-kyo bronze mirror excavated in Tsubai-otsukayama kofun, Yamashiro, Kyoto

However, some scholars argue that the rapid increase of roughly four million people in Japan between the Jōmon and Yayoi periods cannot be explained by migration alone. They attribute the increase primarily to a shift from a hunter-gatherer to an agricultural diet on the islands, with the introduction of rice. It is quite likely that rice cultivation and its subsequent deification allowed for a slow and gradual population increase. Regardless, there is archaeological evidence that supports the idea that there was an influx of farmers from the continent to Japan that absorbed or overwhelmed the native hunter-gatherer population.

Some pieces of Yayoi pottery clearly show the influence of Jōmon ceramics. In addition, the Yayoi lived in the same type of pit or circular dwelling as that of the Jōmon. Other examples of commonality are chipped stone tools for hunting, bone tools for fishing, shells in bracelet construction, and lacquer decoration for vessels and accessories.

=== Languages ===
Most linguists and archaeologists agree that the Japonic language family was introduced to and spread through the Japanese archipelago during the Yayoi period.

According to several linguists, Japonic or proto-Japonic was present on large parts of the southern Korean peninsula. These Peninsular Japonic languages, now extinct, were eventually replaced by Koreanic languages. Similarly, Whitman suggests that the Yayoi are not related to the proto-Koreans, rather that they (the Yayoi) were present on the Korean peninsula during the Mumun pottery period. According to him and several other researchers, Japonic/proto-Japonic arrived in the Korean peninsula around 1500 BC and was brought to the Japanese archipelago by Yayoi wet-rice farmers at some time between 700 and 300 BC. Whitman and Miyamoto associate Japonic as the language family of both Mumun and Yayoi cultures. Several linguists believe that speakers of Koreanic/proto-Koreanic arrived in the Korean Peninsula at some time after the Japonic/proto-Japonic speakers and coexisted with these peoples (i.e. the descendants of both the Mumun and Yayoi cultures) and possibly assimilated them. Both Koreanic and Japonic had prolonged influence on each other and a later founder effect diminished the internal variety of both language families. According to Miyamoto, proto-Japonic and proto-Koreanic shared a common origin in the eastern Liaoxi district of southern Manchuria. Proto-Japonic-speaking peoples migrated to Korea first and were associated with Mumun populations, who were influenced by Pianpu culture from the Liaodong district and rice-farming Shandong populations.

=== Emergence of Wo in Chinese history texts ===
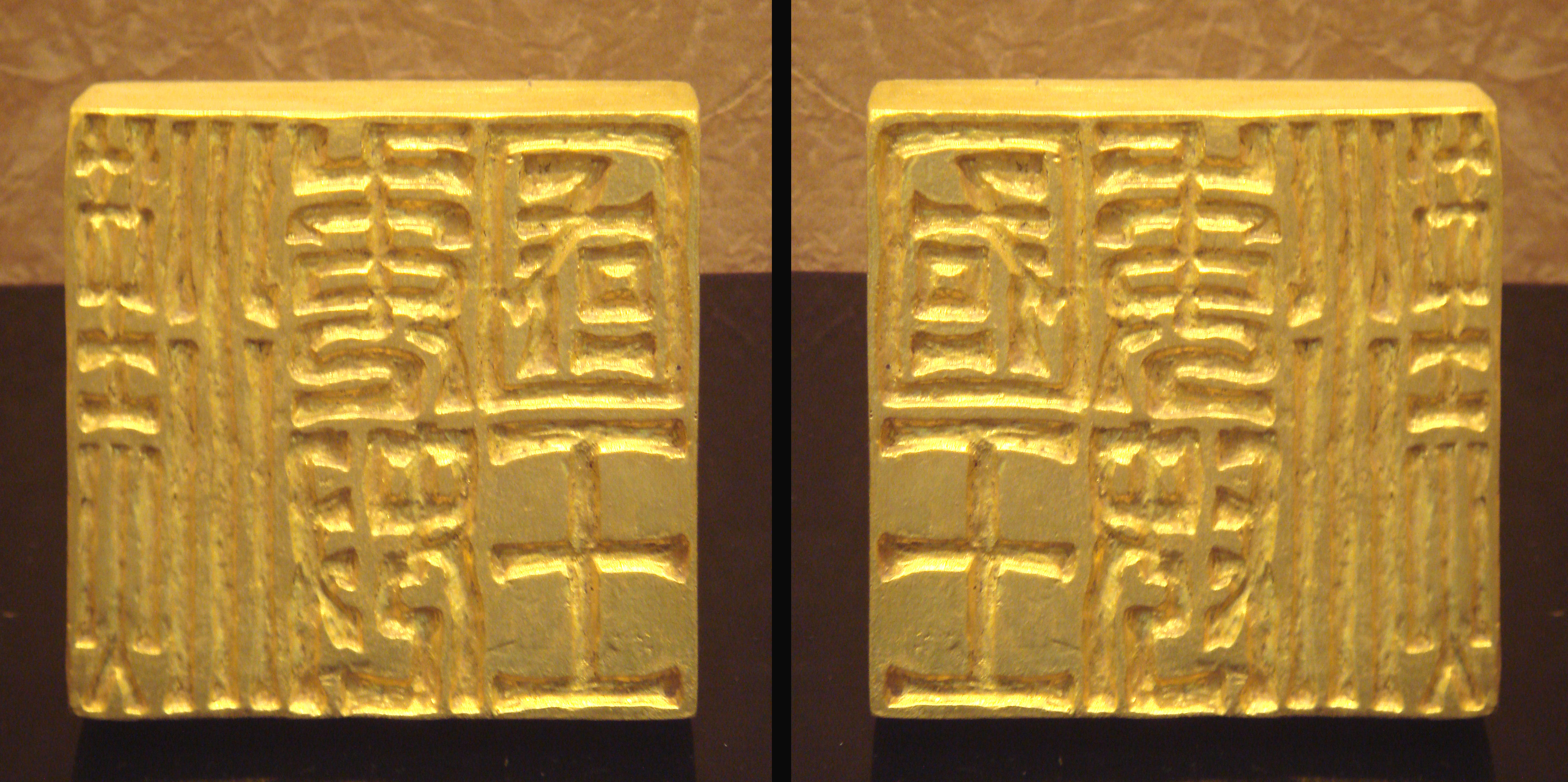
The golden seal said to have been granted to the "King of Na in Wo" by Emperor Guangwu of Han in AD 57. It is inscribed King of Na of Wo in Han Dynasty (漢委奴國王)

The earliest written records about people in Japan are from Chinese sources from this period. Wo, the pronunciation of an early Chinese name for Japan, was mentioned in AD 57; the Na state of Wo received a golden seal from the Emperor Guangwu of the Later Han dynasty. This event was recorded in the Book of the Later Han compiled by Fan Ye in the 5th century. The seal itself was discovered in northern Kyūshū in the 18th century. Wo was also mentioned in 257 in the Wei zhi, a section of the Records of the Three Kingdoms compiled by the 3rd-century scholar Chen Shou.

Early Chinese historians described Wo as a land of hundreds of scattered tribal communities rather than the unified land with a 700-year tradition as laid out in the 8th-century work Nihon Shoki, a historical but heavily narrative streamlined account of Japan which dates the foundation of the country at 660 BC. Archaeological evidence also suggests that frequent conflicts between settlements or statelets broke out in the period. Many excavated settlements were moated or built at the tops of hills. Headless human skeletons discovered in Yoshinogari site are regarded as typical examples of finds from the period. In the coastal area of the Inland Sea, stone arrowheads are often found among funerary objects.

Third-century Chinese sources reported that the Wa people lived on raw fish, vegetables, and rice served on bamboo and wooden trays, clapped their hands in worship (something still done in Shinto shrines today), and built earthen-grave mounds. They also maintained vassal-master relations, collected taxes, had provincial granaries and markets, and observed mourning. Society was characterised by violent struggles.

=== Yamataikoku ===
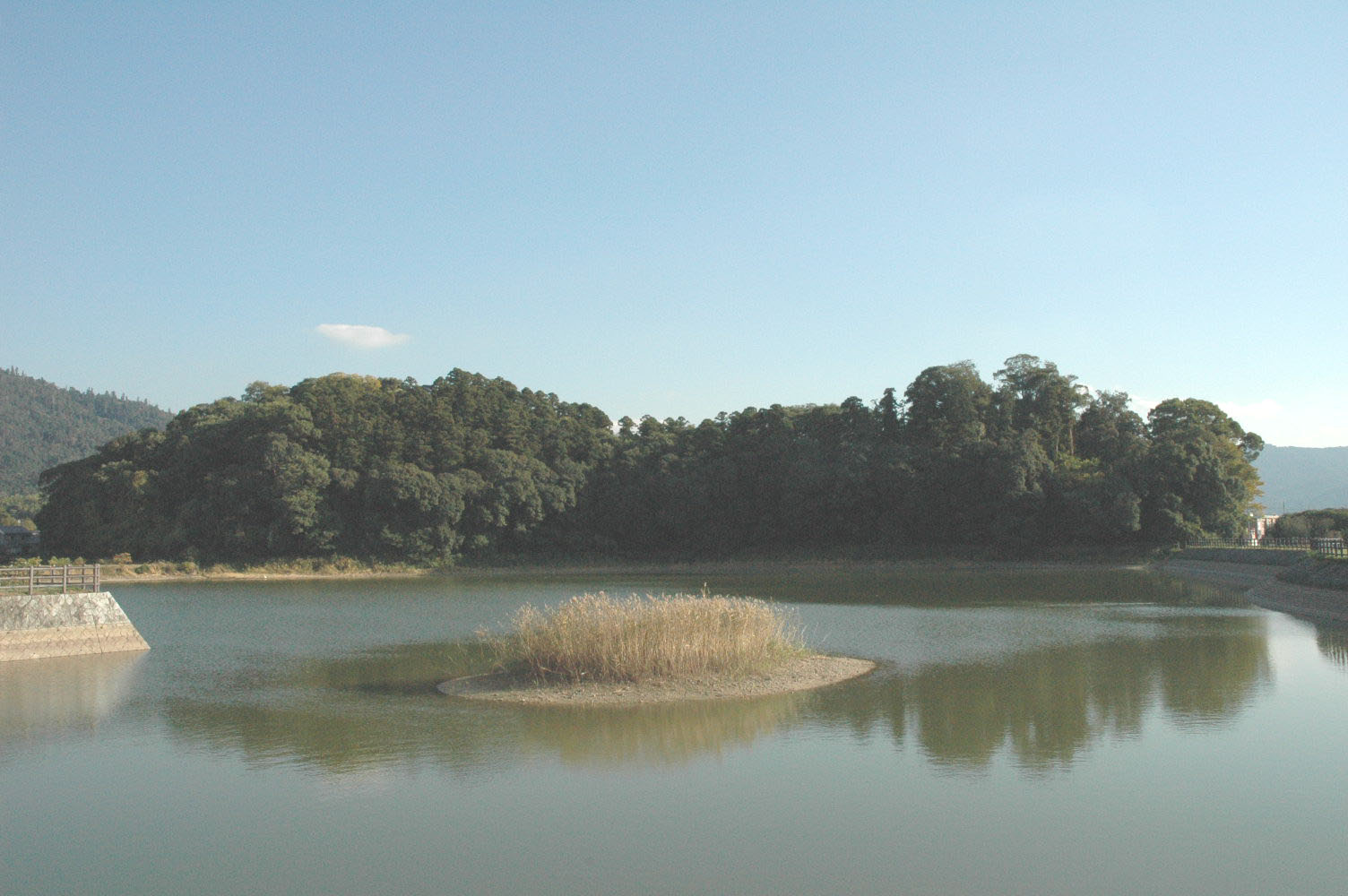
Hashihaka kofun, Sakurai, Nara

The Wei Zhi (Chinese: 魏志), which is part of the Records of the three Kingdoms, first mentions Yamataikoku and Queen Himiko in the 3rd century. According to the record, Himiko assumed the throne of Wa, as a spiritual leader, after a major civil war. Her younger brother was in charge of the affairs of state, including diplomatic relations with the Chinese court of the Kingdom of Wei. When asked about their origins by the Wei embassy, the people of Wa claimed to be descendants of the Taibo of Wu, a historic figure of the Wu Kingdom around the Yangtze Delta of China.

For many years, the location of Yamataikoku and the identity of Queen Himiko have been subject of research. Two possible sites, Yoshinogari in Saga Prefecture and Makimuku in Nara Prefecture have been suggested. Recent archaeological research in Makimuku suggests that Yamataikoku was located in the area. Some scholars assume that the Hashihaka kofun in Makimuku was the tomb of Himiko. Its relation to the origin of the Yamato polity in the following Kofun period is also under debate.

== See also ==
- Ainu people
- Emishi people
- Japanese era name
- Yayoi people
- Wa (name of Japan)
- Zenpokoenfun

== Books cited ==
- Beckwith, Christopher I. (2004), Koguryo, the Language of Japan's Continental Relatives, Brill, ISBN 978-90-04-13949-7.
- Habu, Junko (2004), Ancient Jomon of Japan, Cambridge, MA: Cambridge Press, ISBN 978-0-521-77670-7.
- Miyamoto, Kazuo (2016), "Archaeological Explanation for the Diffusion Theory of the Japonic and Koreanic Language" (PDF), Japanese Journal of Archeology, 4 (1): 53–75.
- Serafim, Leon A. (2008), "The uses of Ryukyuan in understanding Japanese language history", in Frellesvig, Bjarke; Whitman, John (eds.), Proto-Japanese: Issues and Prospects, John Benjamins, pp. 79–99, ISBN 978-90-272-4809-1.
- Unger, J. Marshall (2009), The role of contact in the origins of the Japanese and Korean languages, Honolulu: University of Hawaii Press, ISBN 978-0-8248-3279-7.
- Vovin, Alexander (2013), "From Koguryo to Tamna: Slowly riding to the South with speakers of Proto-Korean", Korean Linguistics, 15 (2): 222–240, doi:10.1075/kl.15.2.03vov.
- Vovin, Alexander (2017), "Origins of the Japanese Language", Oxford Research Encyclopedia of Linguistics, Oxford University Press, doi:10.1093/acrefore/9780199384655.013.277, ISBN 978-0-19-938465-5.
