= Hakata Bay =

Bay in Northwest Kyūshū

Coordinates: 33.6180°N 130.3330°E

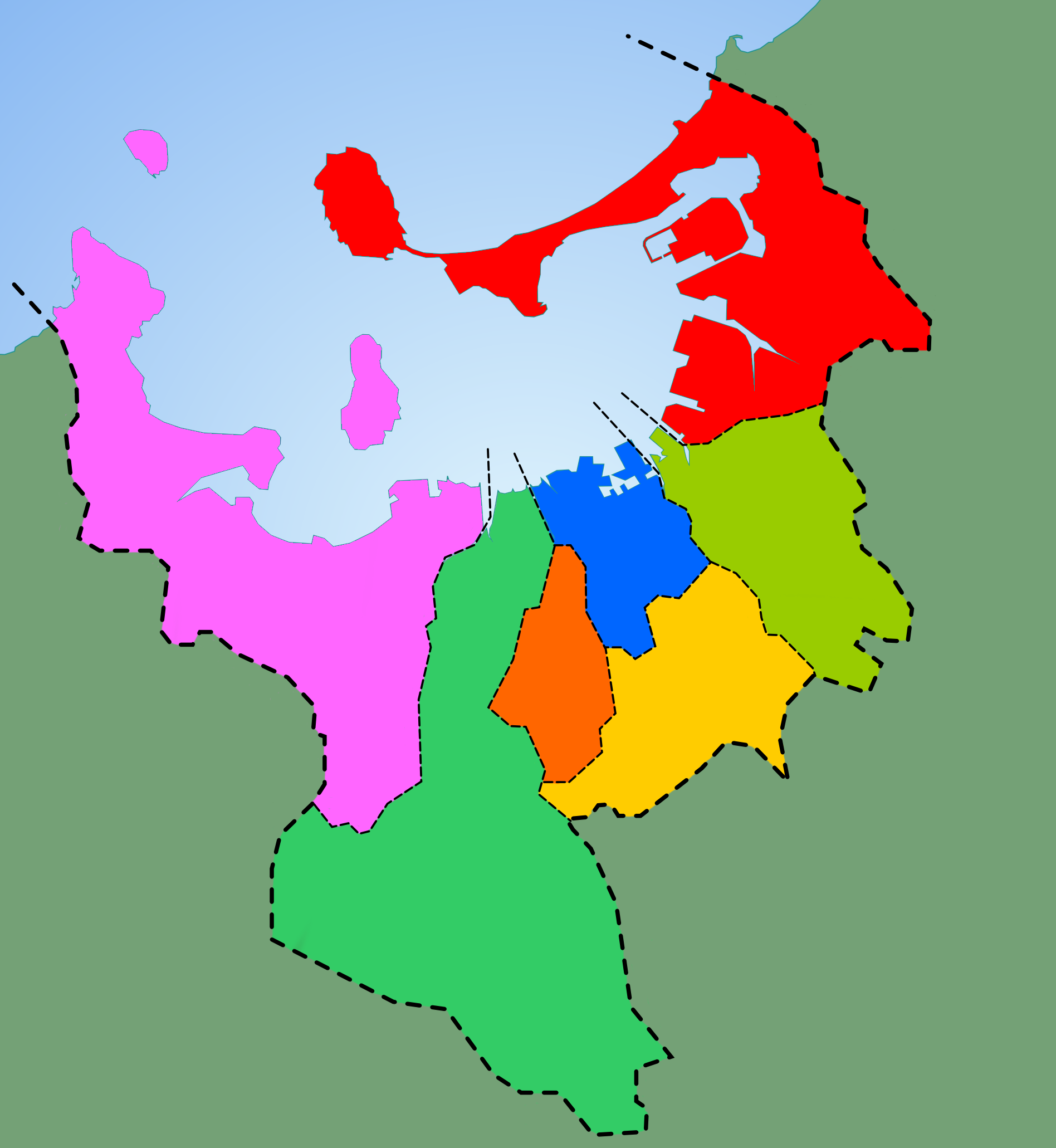
The city of Fukuoka encircling Hakata Bay (light blue). The colored areas represent the different wards of the city.

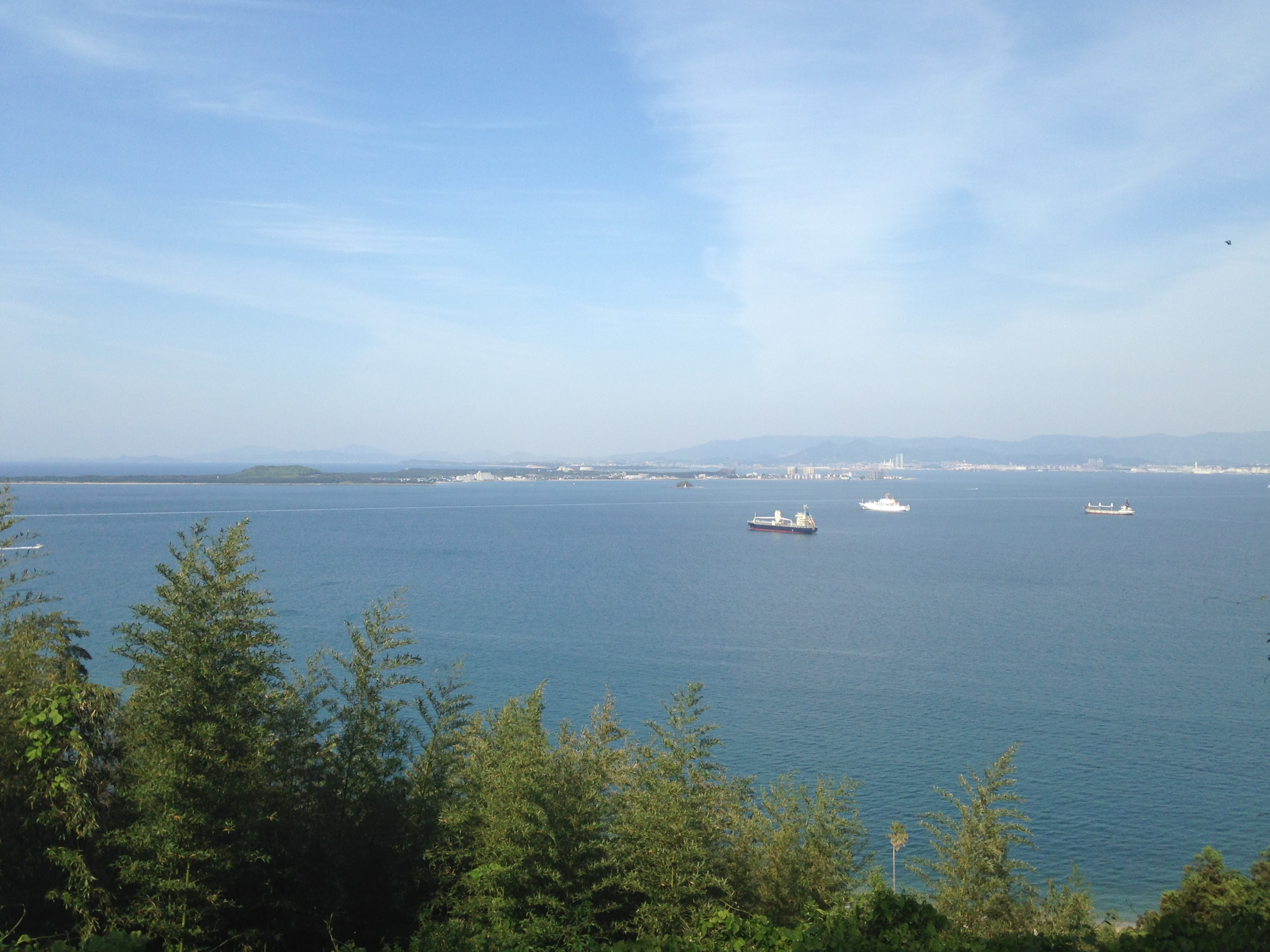
View of Hakata Bay from Noko Island. Land on the left is Umino Nakamichi

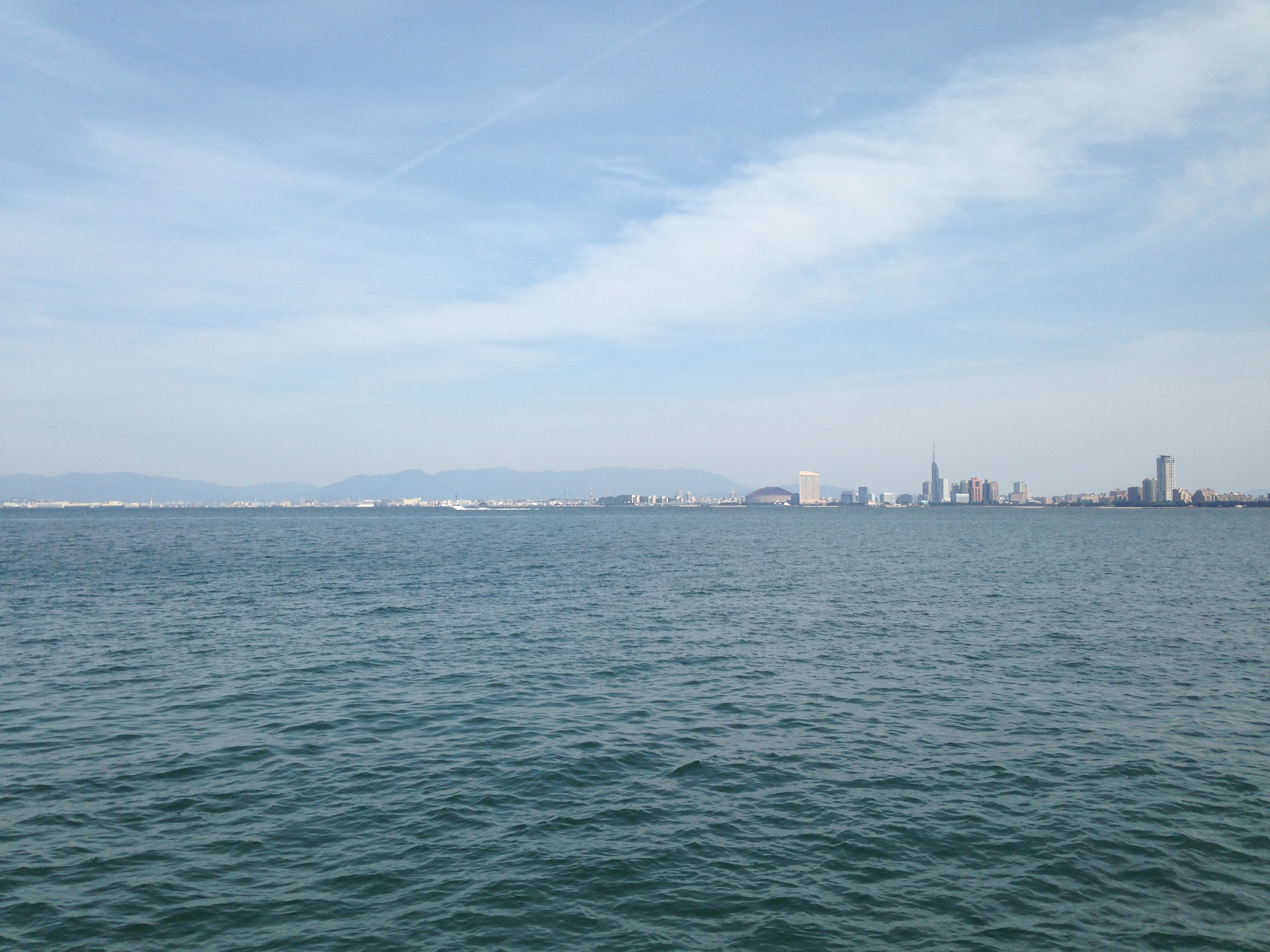
View of Hakata Bay and center of Fukuoka City from Noko Island

Hakata Bay (博多湾, Hakata-wan) is a bay in the northwestern part of Fukuoka city, on the Japanese island of Kyūshū. It faces the Tsushima Strait, and features beaches and a port, though parts of the bay have been reclaimed in the expansion of the city of Fukuoka. The bay is near the site of the Mongol invasions of Japan of 1274 and 1281; both invasions are sometimes referred to as the "Battle of Hakata Bay."

== Geography ==
The Bay is defined by shoal Umi-no-nakamichi and tombolo Shika-no-shima (Shika Island) to the north, and Genkai-jima (Genkai Island) to the northwest, and the Itoshima Peninsula to the west. Five wards of Fukuoka city border on the bay, which is sometimes labeled "Fukuoka Bay" on maps. Sometimes, the bay is divided into Hakata, Fukuoka, and Imazu Bays, though for simplicity's sake, the term "Hakata Bay" is commonly used as a catch-all to refer to all three.

The bay is roughly 10 km from north to south, and 20 km from east to west, covering an area of roughly 133 km^{2}. The coastline stretches 128 km. The mouth of the bay is only 7.7 km wide, shielding it to a great extent from the waves of the Strait. The bay is only 10 metres deep on average, 23 m at its deepest point, though the tides bring a two-metre change in the water level. Set routes are used, therefore, through the bay, to protect ships' drafts.

Land reclamation began to be undertaken before the Meiji period, and continued into the post-war period. Since 1945, 1167 square kilometres of land have been reclaimed from the bay, primarily to improve or reinforce the effective functioning of the port. In 1994, an artificial island was begun to be created and called Island City (アイランドシティ, Airandoshiti).

Some particular petrified trees in the area are said to have been the masts of ships used in Empress Jingū's third century invasion of Korea. Veins of mica and pegmatite under the bay, part of a geologic fault, are under governmental protection.

Much of the area is included in the Genkai National Park, and efforts are made to maintain and preserve the natural features and environment both in the bay and on its islands. Though much of the shoreline is natural, some parts, particularly in and around the port itself, are artificial and developed upon; the bay's shoreline was, somewhat crudely, officially designated as natural wilderness and parkland.

=== Islands ===
A number of small islands are contained either within the bay or around it.

- Hashima (端島; Ha Island)
- Island City (アイランドシティ)
- Mishima (御島; Mi Island)
- Noko-no-shima (能古島; Noko Island)
- Shika-no-shima (志賀島; Shika Island)
- Ugu-shima (鵜来島; Ugu Island)
- Hō-jima (宝島; Hō Island)

== History ==
The bay and its surrounding settlements were active and significant locations as early as the 3rd century and the Kofun period. Many historical figures of great significance passed through or lived in Hakata, and many major events occurred there. The ruins of Fukuoka Castle lie along the bay, and an active port has existed there for many centuries.

The area is said to have been recognized by China as early as 57 CE. Emperor Guangwu of Han is believed to have bestowed a Golden Seal to the local leaders, acknowledging (or granting) their authority over the area then called Na no kuni (奴国; Na Country or Na Province). Emissaries from the Chinese kingdom of Cao Wei arrived in the 3rd century, and Empress Jingū is said to have launched her invasion of Korea from this port. By the 7th century, Hakata was the port through which official missions to Tang China were sent and received.

Following the defeat of Yamato (Japan) and Baekche in the battle of Hakusukinoe in 663, fears arose of invasions from Silla and China, and areas around the bay were fortified. The first mention of the area (by the name Chikushi) in the Nihon Shoki corresponds to this time period.

Kūkai was one of many famous people who journeyed to China through this port. In 806, he returned to Japan and founded Tōchō-ji Temple nearby. Sugawara no Michizane, after having been ambassador to China, and holding a number of other high posts at Court in Kyoto, was demoted to a post in Hakata in 901. Fujiwara no Sumitomo, having opposed Taira no Masakado's rebellion in 939, fled to Hakata two years later, where he was captured and killed.

As the closest major bay and port to mainland Asia in Japan, Hakata has played a major role in diplomacy and trade with Korea and China throughout much of history. This also made it, however, a key point of attack for attempts to invade the Japanese islands. In the Toi Invasion of 1019, Jurchens seized several nearby islands, using them as bases from which to raid and attack Hakata.

Mongol emissaries first arrived in 1268, and all the samurai armies of Kyūshū was mobilized in anticipation of the first of the Mongol invasions of Japan, which came six years later. Kublai Khan's forces seized Tsushima and Iki Island before landing on the shores of Hakata Bay on November 19. The invaders were eventually repelled, and extensive fortification efforts were undertaken in the ensuing years. The second invasion arrived in 1281, and was similarly repelled. Though referred to in Japanese as the battles of Bun'ei and Kōan (文永と弘安の役), both of these invasion attempts are frequently referred to in English sources as the "Battle of Hakata Bay."

In April 1336, at Tadara-no-hama on the bay, Ashikaga Takauji led a force against the Kikuchi clan, allies of Go-Daigo, led by Kikuchi Taketoshi. Victorious, Takauji "at one stroke the Ashikaga leader became virtually master of Kyushi."

Jesuit missionary Francis Xavier passed through Hakata on the way from Hirado to Kyo.

Through the Edo period (1603–1868), Hakata handled only for domestic trade, as international trade or travel was forbidden by the Tokugawa shogunate except at designated ports. Hakata reopened to international trade in 1899. Following the end of World War II, this was one of the primary ports through which Japanese soldiers and civilian residents of the colonies were repatriated. Hakata remained an important port throughout the post-war period, and still serves this function today.
