= Shika Island =

Island in Higashi-ku, Fukuoka, Japan

Coordinates: 33°40′30″N 130°18′0″E

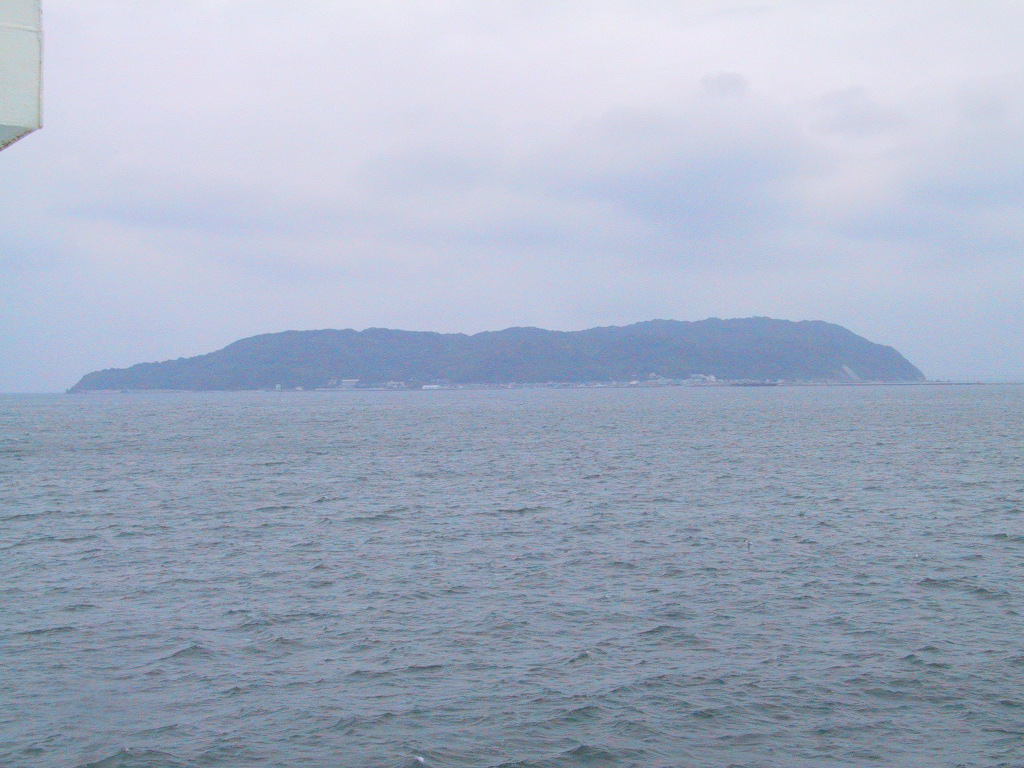
Panorama view of South-West Shika Island from ferry on Hakata Bay

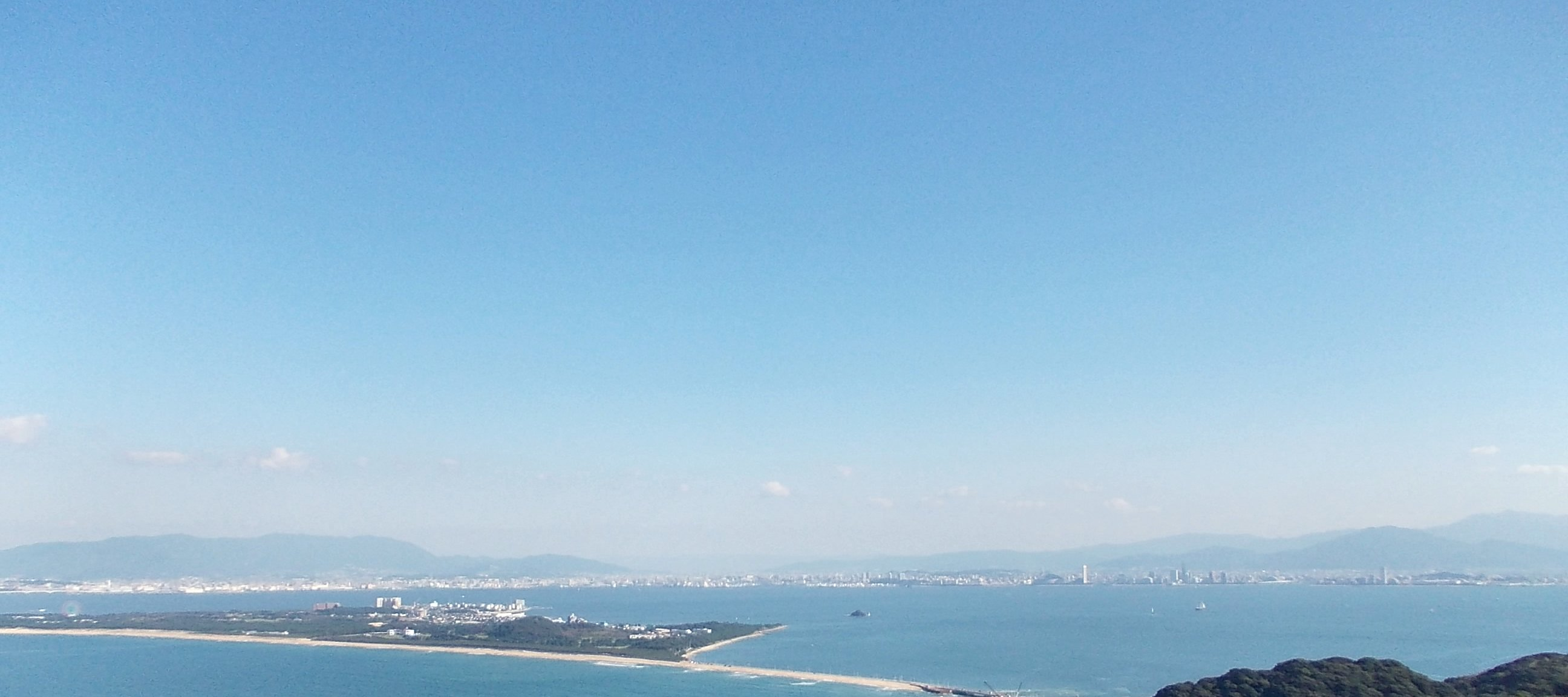
A view of the entire Hakata Bay from Shiomi-kōen Park Observation Deck

Shikanoshima Island (志賀島, Shika-no-shima) is an island in Higashi-ku, Fukuoka, Japan. The island is known as the spot where the Gold Seal of the King of Na, a national treasure, was discovered. The island is about 11 kilometres around and connected to the Umi no Nakamichi (road) on the mainland by a causeway.

On the hill that commands a view of Hakata Bay, two farmers found the golden seal in 1784. The area was developed into a park to commemorate the discovery, and designated Kin-in Park. According to Chinese chronicles, about 2,000 years ago, the Emperor Guangwu of Han, a dynasty of ancient China, granted an envoy from Japan a golden block seal, which was to be presented to the envoy's king. The seal was engraved with the characters 「漢委奴国王」"(Han wa na koku-ō"), meaning "[From the King of] Han, presented to the King of Nakoku". The seal can be seen in the Fukuoka City Museum.

Notable people from the island include actress and former Nogizaka46 member Yūki Yoda and singer Sayuri.

It is home to Shikaumi Shrine.

== See also ==
- King of Na gold seal
