= Umi no Nakamichi =

Tombolo in Higashi-ku, Fukuoka, Fukuoka Prefecture, Japan

Coordinates: 33°39′39″N 130°19′08″E

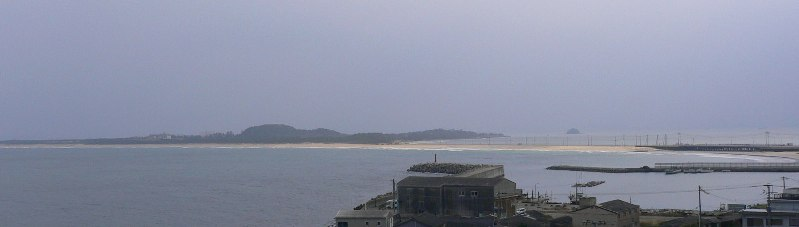
Umi no Nakamichi

Umi no Nakamichi (海の中道, 'road in the middle of the sea' or 'path through the sea') is a tombolo in Higashi-ku, Fukuoka, Fukuoka Prefecture, Japan. It connects Kyushu Island and Shikanoshima Island. It is 8km in length and up to 2.5 km in width. Its northern coast borders Genkai Sea and its southern coast Hakata Bay.

== Nature and land use ==
Although most of the area consists of sand dunes, the eastern area has older sand dunes that form terrace-like cliffs deposited in the Pleistocene era. There are also hills of Paleocene strata to the west. A pine forest of Japanese black pines spreads across the sand dunes, known as the Nata Pine Grove. The Shishiki Shrine is located on the sand dunes of the pine grove.

The width of the sandbar is not uniform. Sand spits extend towards Hakata Bay at Saitozaki (西戸崎) in the west and Gan no Su (雁の巣) in the east, with the former exceeding 2 kilometers in width. Other parts are less than 0.5 kilometers wide.

The central to northwestern part of the sandbar is a park and recreation area. The easternmost part contains the Fukuoka City Karasu no Su Recreation Center, and to the west are Uminonakamichi Seaside Park, Marine World (aquarium), Nishidozaki Seaside Country Club, Crane Fukuoka (horseback riding), and other recreational activities.

== History ==
In the Chikuzen no Kuni Fudoki fragment of the Nara period, Umi no Nakamichi appears in the entry about Shikanoshima under the name Uchiage no Hama. Salt production was carried out by local fishermen since ancient times, and fishing tools, shell mounds, and salt-making pottery from the 8th to 10th centuries have been excavated from near Shioya-bana (Salt House Cape).

It is unclear when the name Umi no Nakamichi came into use. The Chikuzen no Kuni Fudoki fragment records that the villagers were already calling it by this name at that time.

== Transportation ==
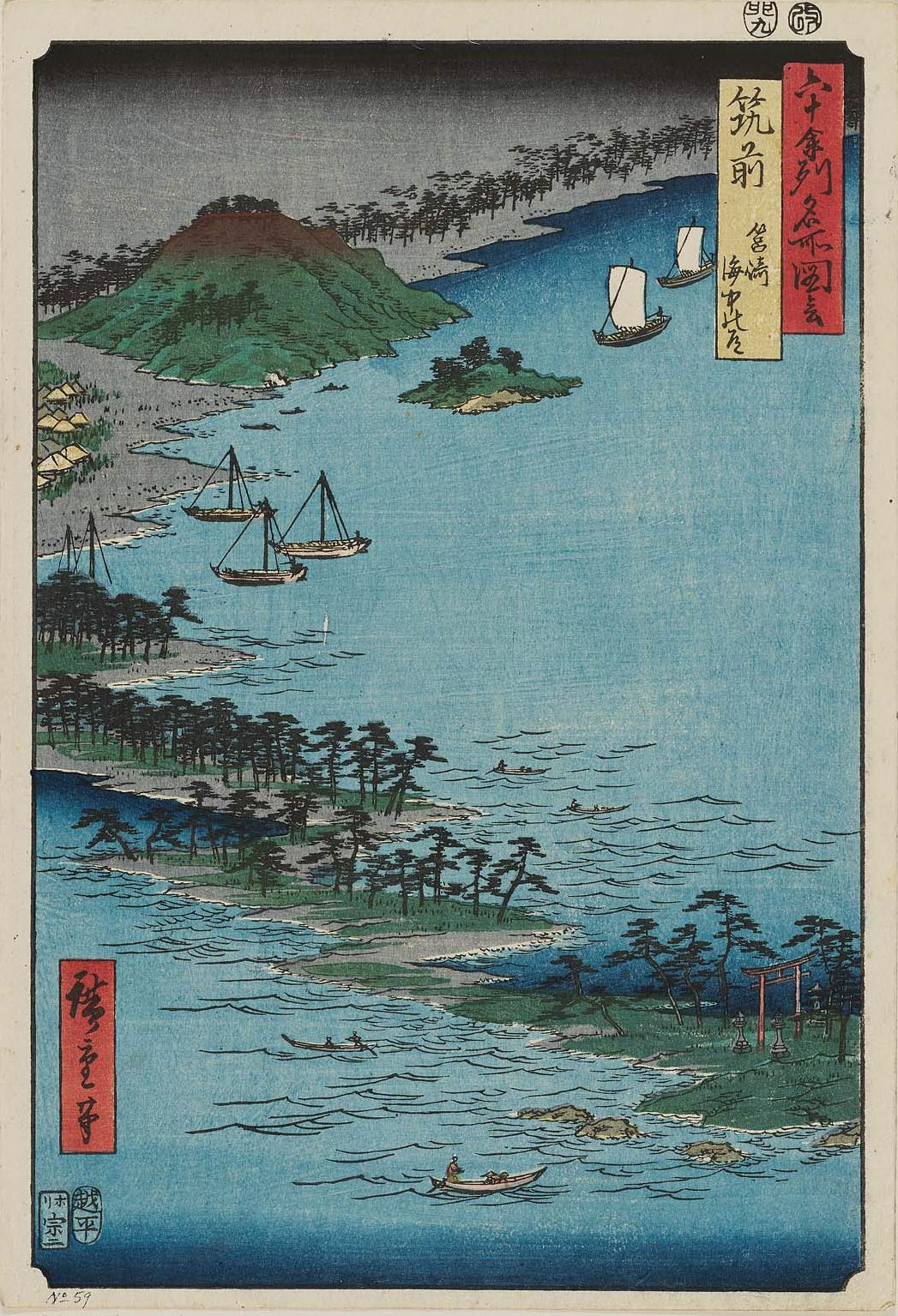
Hiroshige

The JR Kashii Line (Uminonakamichi Line) and Fukuoka Prefectural Road 59 Shikanoshima Wajiro Line run parallel through the center of the sandbar. There are four stations on the Kashii Line: Nata Station, Karasu no Su Station, Uminonakamichi Station, and Nishidozaki Station. Prefectural Road 59 extends from the westernmost part of Umi no Nakamichi to Shikanoshima via Shikanoshima Bridge. In October 2002, the Umi no Nakamichi Bridge connected the Karasu no Su area with Island City to the south, significantly reducing the distance to central Fukuoka City. For sea transportation, the city-operated ferry runs between Bayside Place Hakata Pier in Hakata Ward and Nishidozaki/Shikanoshima, while Yasuda Sangyo Steamship operates to routes under the name "Uminaka Line" from Bayside Place Hakata Pier and from Marizon in Seaside Momochi, Sawara Ward, to the Uminonakamichi Ferry Terminal.
