= Wa (name of Japan) =

Oldest recorded name of Japan

- Chinese character for Wō or Wa, formed by the "person" radical 亻and a wěi or wa 委 phonetic element

Chinese name
- Chinese: 倭
- Literal meaning: submissive, distant, dwarf
Transcriptions
Standard Mandarin
- Hanyu Pinyin: wō
Middle Chinese
- Middle Chinese: /ʔuɑ/
Old Chinese
- Zhengzhang: /*qoːl/

Korean name
- Hangul: 왜
- Hanja: 倭
- Literal meaning: dwarf
Transcriptions
- Revised Romanization: wae
- McCune–Reischauer: wae

Japanese name
- Kanji: 倭 / 和
- Kana: わ
Transcriptions
- Revised Hepburn: wa

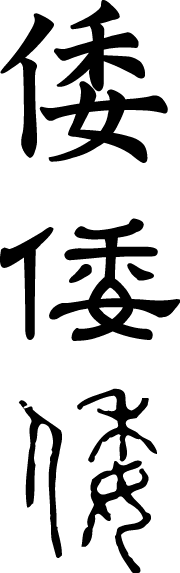
Top to bottom: 倭; wō in regular, clerical and small seal scripts

Wa (Note: From Chinese and Japanese: 倭; pinyin: wō; rōmaji: wa; Eastern Han Chinese *ʔwɑi > *ʔuɑi > Middle Chinese ʔuɑ) is the oldest attested name of Japan (Note: Names such as Fusang or Penglai are mythological or legendary, and as such are not considered.) and ethnonym of the Japanese people. From c. the 2nd century AD Chinese and Korean scribes used the Chinese character 倭; 'submissive', 'distant', 'dwarf' to refer to the various inhabitants of the Japanese archipelago, although it might have been just used to transcribe the phonetic value of a Japonic ethnonym with a respectively differing semantic connotation. In the 8th century, the Japanese started using the character 和, wa, 'harmony', 'peace', 'balance' instead due to the offensive nature of the former. Although the etymological origins of Wa remain uncertain, proposals include a transcription of the Japanese first-person pronouns waga and ware. In modern times, 倭 is used in China and Korea as a derogatory term for Japan and the Japanese people.

== Etymology ==
Although the etymological origins of Wa remain uncertain, Chinese historical texts recorded an ancient people residing in the Japanese archipelago (perhaps Kyūshū), named something like *ɁWâ, transcribed with Chinese character 倭, pronounced *ʔuɑi < *ʔwɑi in Eastern Han Chinese. In modern Chinese dictionaries, Carr surveys prevalent proposals for Wa's etymology ranging from a transcription of the Japanese first-person pronouns waga 我が "my; our" and ware 我 "I; oneself; thou" to Wa as 倭 implying "dwarf barbarians", and summarizes interpretations for *ʼWâ "Japanese" into variations on two etymologies: "behaviorally 'submissive' or physically 'short'".

The first "submissive; obedient" explanation began with the (121 CE) Shuowen Jiezi dictionary. It defines 倭 as shùnmào 順皃 "obedient/submissive", graphically explains the "person; human' radical with a wěi 委 "bent" phonetic, and quotes the above Shi Jing poem. According to the 1716 Kangxi Dictionary (倭又人名 魯宣公名倭), 倭 was the name of King Tuyen (魯宣公) of Lu (魯國 c. 1042 – 249 BCE). "Conceivably, when Chinese first met Japanese," Carr suggests "they transcribed Wa as *ʼWâ 'bent back' signifying 'compliant' bowing/obeisance. Bowing is noted in early historical references to Japan." Examples include "Respect is shown by squatting", and "they either squat or kneel, with both hands on the ground. This is the way they show respect.". Koji Nakayama interprets wēi 逶 "winding" as "very far away" and euphemistically translates Wō 倭 as "separated from the continent".

The second etymology of wō 倭 meaning "dwarf; short person" has possible cognates in ǎi 矮 "short (of stature); midget, dwarf; low", wō 踒 "strain; sprain; bent legs", and wò 臥 "lie down; crouch; sit (animals and birds)". Early Chinese dynastic histories refer to a Zhūrúguó 侏儒國 "pygmy/dwarf country" located south of Japan, associated with possibly Okinawa Island or the Ryukyu Islands. Carr cites the historical precedence of construing Wa as "submissive people" and the "Country of Dwarfs" legend as evidence that the "little people" etymology was a secondary development.

Since early Chinese information about Wo/Wa peoples was based largely on hearsay, Wang Zhenping says, "Little is certain about the Wo except they were obedient and complaisant."

According to Whitman the Wei Shu states that "Chinhan men and women are close to Wa (男女近倭)" the ethnonym for the contemporary inhabitants of the Japanese archipelago and like the Wa tattoo their bodies. The Hou Han Shu identifies this as a feature of Byeonhan, stating that "their country is close to Wa, therefore they frequently have tattoos." Wa-like toponyms have been found in Byeonhan and Jinhan confederacies, hinting at a possible presence of Japonic speaking populations who were albeit grouped together with the Koreanic speaking 韓 Han.

The Japanese endonym Wa 倭 "Japan" derives from the Chinese exonym Wō 倭 "Japan, Japanese", a graphic pejorative Chinese character that had some offensive connotation, possibly "submissive, docile, obedient", "bowing; bent over", or "short person; dwarf" in modern times.

倭理 is read as *YEli in Old Korean and appears to have been the Korean word for "Japanese" and was attested as 예〯 yěy in Middle Korean. Its morphological quality is unknown along with the differing phonetic value of the first syllable.

=== 倭 and 和 characters ===
The Chinese character 倭 combines the 人 or 亻 "human, person" radical and a wěi 委 "bend" phonetic component. This wěi phonetic element depicts hé 禾 "grain" over nǚ 女 "woman", which Bernhard Karlgren semantically analyzes as: "bend down, bent, tortuous, crooked; fall down, throw down, throw away, send away, reject; send out, delegate – to bend like a 女 woman working with the 禾 grain." The oldest written forms of 倭 are in Seal script, and it has not been identified in Bronzeware script or Oracle bone script.

Most characters written with this wěi 委 phonetic are pronounced wei in Standard Chinese:

- wèi 魏 ("ghost" radical) "the state of Wei"
- wēi 逶 ("motion" radical) "serpentine; winding, curving" [in wēiyí 逶迤 "winding (road, river)"]
- wěi 萎 ("plant" radical) "wilt; wither; atrophy; tire, grow weary; (metaphorically) decline, fade"
- wěi 痿 ("sickness" radical) "paralysis; impotence"
- wěi 諉 ("speech" radical) "shirk; shift blame (onto others)"
- wèi 餧 ("food" radical) "feed (animals)"

The unusual Wō 倭 "Japan" pronunciation of the wěi 委 phonetic element is also present in:

- wō 踒 ("foot" radical) "strain; sprain (sinew or muscle)"
- wǒ 婑 ("woman" radical) "beautiful" [in wǒtuǒ 婑媠 "beautiful; pretty"] (In this word's case, the phonemic segments are identical, but the tonemes differ.)

A third pronunciation is found in the reading of the following character:

- ǎi 矮 ("arrow" radical) "dwarf, short of stature; low; inferior"

和 (わ)

Nara period Japanese scholars believed that Chinese character for Wō 倭 "Japan", which they used to write "Wa" or "Yamato", was graphically pejorative in denoting 委 "bent down" 亻 "people". Around 757 CE, Japan officially changed its endonym from Wa 倭 to Wa 和 "harmony; peace; sum; total". This replacement Chinese character hé 和 combines a hé 禾 "grain" phonetic (also seen in 倭) and the "mouth" radical 口. Carr explains:

Graphic replacement of the 倭 "dwarf Japanese" Chinese logograph became inevitable. Not long after the Japanese began using 倭 to write Wa ~ Yamato 'Japan', they realized its 'dwarf; bent back' connotation. In a sense, they had been tricked by Chinese logography; the only written name for 'Japan' was deprecating. The chosen replacement wa 和 'harmony; peace' had the same Japanese wa pronunciation as 倭 'dwarf', and - most importantly - it was semantically flattering. The notion that Japanese culture is based upon wa 和 'harmony' has become an article of faith among Japanese and Japanologists.

In current Japanese usage, Wa 倭 "old name for Japan" is a variant Chinese character for Wa 和 "Japan", excepting a few historical terms like the Five kings of Wa, wakō (Chinese Wōkòu 倭寇 "Japanese pirates"), and Wamyō Ruijushō dictionary. In marked contrast, Wa 和 is a common adjective in Sino-Japanese compounds like Washoku 和食 "Japanese cuisine", Wafuku 和服 "Japanese clothing", Washitsu 和室 "Japanese-style room", Waka 和歌 "Japanese-style poetry", Washi 和紙 "traditional Japanese paper", Wagyu 和牛 "Japanese cattle".

=== Pronunciations ===
Pronunciations

Chinese name
- Chinese: 倭
Transcriptions
Standard Mandarin
- Hanyu Pinyin: wō
- Bopomofo: ㄨㄛ
- Wade–Giles: wo1
Wu
- Romanization: u
Hakka
- Romanization: vo24
Yue: Cantonese
- Yale Romanization: wō
- Jyutping: wo1
Southern Min
- Hokkien POJ: e
- Tâi-lô: e

Korean name
- Hangul: 왜
- Hanja: 倭
Transcriptions
- Revised Romanization: wae
- McCune–Reischauer: wae

Japanese name
- Kanji: 倭, 和
- Kana: わ, やまと
Transcriptions
- Revised Hepburn: wa, yamato

In Chinese, the character 倭 can be pronounced wēi "winding", wǒ "an ancient hairstyle", or Wō "Japan". The first two pronunciations are restricted to Classical Chinese bisyllabic words. Wēi 倭 occurs in wēichí 倭遲 "winding; sinuous; circuitous; meandering", which has numerous variants including wēiyí 逶迤 and 委蛇. The oldest recorded usage of 倭 is the Shi Jing (162) description of a wēichí 倭遲 "winding; serpentine; tortuous" road; compare (18) using wēituó 委佗 "compliant; bending, pliable; graceful". Wǒ 倭 occurs in wǒduòjì 倭墮髻 "a woman's hairstyle with a bun, popular during the Han dynasty". The third pronunciation Wō 倭 "Japan; Japanese" is more productive than the first two, as evident in Chinese names for "Japanese" things (e.g., Wōkòu 倭寇 "Japanese pirates" above) or "dwarf; pygmy" animals.

- wōqī 倭漆 "Japanese lacquerware"
- wōdāo 倭刀 "Japanese sword"
- wōguā 倭瓜 (lit. "Japanese melon") "pumpkin; squash"
- wōhémǎ 倭河馬 "pygmy hippopotamus"
- wōzhū 倭豬 "pygmy hog"
- wōhúhóu 倭狐猴 "dwarf lemur"
- wōheixingxing 倭黑猩猩 "pygmy chimpanzee"

Reconstructed pronunciations of wō 倭 in Middle Chinese (c. 6th–10th centuries CE) include ʼuâ (Bernhard Karlgren), ʼua (Zhou Fagao), and ʼwa (Edwin G. Pulleyblank). Reconstructions in Old Chinese (c. 6th–3rd centuries BCE) include *ʼwâ (Karlgren), *ʼwər (Dong Tonghe), and *ʼwə^{r} (Zhou).

In Japanese, the Chinese character 倭 has Sinitic on'yomi pronunciations of wa or ka from Chinese wō "Japan" and wǒ "an ancient hairstyle", or wi or i from wēi "winding; obedient", and native kun'yomi pronunciations of yamato "Japan" or shitagau "obey, obedient". Chinese wō 倭 "an old name for Japan" is a loanword in other East Asian languages including Korean 왜 wae or wa.

=== Lexicography ===
In modern dictionaries, an article by Michael Carr "compares how Oriental and Occidental lexicographers have treated the fact that Japan's first written name was a Chinese Wō < *ʼWâ 倭 'short/submissive people' insult." It evaluates 92 dictionary definitions of Chinese Wō 倭 to illustrate lexicographical problems with defining ethnically offensive words. In modern dictionaries, this corpus of monolingual and bilingual Chinese dictionaries includes 29 Chinese-Chinese, 17 Chinese-English, 13 Chinese to other Western Languages, and 33 Chinese-Japanese dictionaries. To analyze how Chinese dictionaries deal with the belittling origins of Wō, Carr divides definitions into four types, abbreviated with Greek alphabet letters Alpha through Delta.

- Α = "dwarf; Japanese"
- Β = "compliant; Japanese"
- Γ = "derogatory Japanese"
- Δ = "Japanese"

For example, Alpha (A) type includes both overt definitions like "The land of dwarfs; Japan" (Liushi Han-Ying cidian 劉氏漢英辭典 [Liu's Chinese-English Dictionary] 1978) and more sophisticated semantic distinctions like "(1) A dwarf. (2) Formerly, used to refer to Japan" (Lin Yutang's Chinese-English Dictionary of Modern Usage 1972). Beta (B) "compliant; Japanese" is illustrated by "demütig [humble; submissive; meek], gehorchen [obey; respond]" Praktisches zeichenlexikon chinesisch-deutsch-japanisch [A Practical Chinese-German-Japanese Character Dictionary] (1983). Gamma (Γ) "type definitions such as "depreciatingly Japanese" (e.g., A Beginner's Chinese-English Dictionary of the National Language (Gwoyeu) 1964) include usage labels such as "derogatory", "disparaging", "offensive", or "contemptuous". Some Γ notations are restricted to subentries like "Wōnú 倭奴 (in modern usage, derogatively) the Japs" (Zuixin shiyong Han-Ying cidian 最新實用和英辭典 [A New Practical Chinese-English Dictionary] 1971). Delta (Δ) "Japanese" is the least informative type of gloss; for instance, "an old name for Japan" (Xin Han-Ying cidian 新漢英詞典 [A New Chinese-English Dictionary] 1979).

Carr evaluates these four typologies for defining the Chinese 倭 "bent people" graphic pejoration.

From a theoretical standpoint, A "dwarf" or B "submissive" type definitions are preferable for providing accurate etymological information, even though it may be deemed offensive. It is no transgression for an abridged Chinese dictionary to give a short Δ "Japan" definition, but adding "an old name for" or "archaic" takes no more space than adding a Γ "derogatory" note. A Δ definition avoids offending the Japanese, but misleads the dictionary user in the same way as the OED2 defining wetback and white trash without usage labels.

The table below (Carr 1992:31, "Table 8. Overall Comparison of Definitions") summarizes how Chinese dictionaries define Wō 倭.

Definition Type	Chinese–Chinese	Chinese–English	Chinese–Other	Chinese–Japanese
Α "dwarf; Japanese"	3 (10%)	10 (59%)	5 (38%)	4 (12%)
Β "compliant; Japanese"	0	0	1 (8%)	4 (12%)
Γ derogatory Japanese	0	1 (6%)	3 (23%)	11 (33%)
Δ "Japanese"	26 (90%)	6 (35%)	4 (31%)	14 (42%)
Total Dictionaries	29	17	13	33

Today, half of the Western language dictionaries note that Chinese Wō 倭 "Japanese" means "little person; dwarf", while most Chinese-Chinese definitions overlook the graphic slur with Δ type "ancient name for Japan" definitions. This demeaning A "dwarf" description is found more often in Occidental language dictionaries than in Oriental ones. The historically more accurate, and ethnically less insulting, "subservient; compliant" B type is limited to Chinese-Japanese and Chinese-German dictionaries. The Γ type "derogatory" notation occurs most often among Japanese and European language dictionaries. The least edifying Δ "(old name for) Japan" type definitions are found twice more often in Chinese-Chinese than in Chinese-Japanese dictionaries, and three times more than in Western ones.

Even the modern-day Unicode universal character standard reflects inherent lexicographic problems with this ancient Chinese Wō 倭 "Japan" affront. The Unihan (Unified CJK characters) segment of Unicode largely draws definitions from two online dictionary projects, the Chinese CEDICT and Japanese EDICT. The former lists Chinese wo1 倭 "Japanese; dwarf", wokou4 倭寇 "(in ancient usage) the dwarf-pirates; the Japs", and wonu2 倭奴 "(used in ancient times) the Japanese; (in modern usage, derogatively) the Japs". The latter lists Japanese yamato 倭 "ancient Japan", wajin 倭人 "(an old word for) a Japanese", and wakou 倭寇 "Japanese pirates."

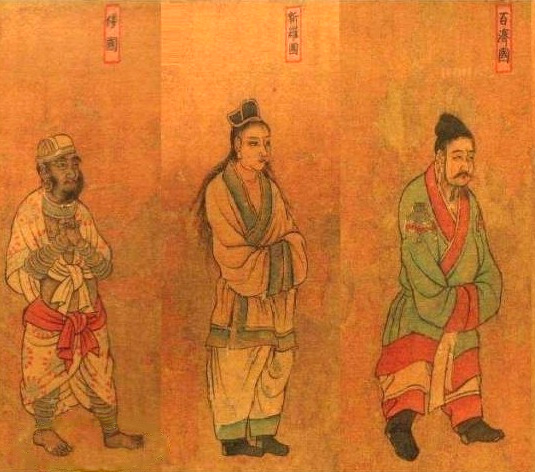
The 6th century 唐閻立本王會圖; Táng yánlìběn wáng huì tú, depicting envoys visiting the Tang emperor. From left to right, ambassadors from Wa, Silla, and Baekje. Wa is represented here by Kumaso or Azumi settlers of Kyushu.

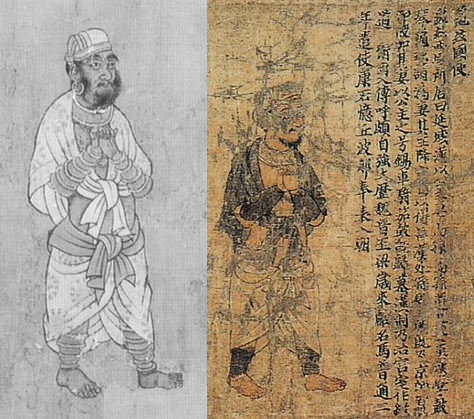
11th century Song copy of the Portraits of Periodical Offering of Liang, depicting Wa tributaries c. 516–520 CE at the court of Emperor Yuan of Liang in the capital Jingzhou, with explanatory text

== Historical references ==
The earliest textual references to Japan are in the Chinese classic texts. Within the official Chinese dynastic Twenty-Four Histories, Japan is mentioned among the so-called 'Eastern barbarians'.

The historian Wang Zhenping summarizes Wa contacts from the Han dynasty to the Sixteen Kingdoms period:

When chieftains of various Wo tribes contacted authorities at Lelang, a Chinese commandery established in northern Korea in 108 B.C. by the Western Han court, they sought to benefit themselves by initiating contact. In A.D. 57, the first Wo ambassador arrived at the capital of the Eastern Han court (25–220); the second came in 107.

Wo diplomats never called on China on a regular basis. A chronology of Japan–China relations from the first to the ninth centuries reveals this irregularity in the visits of Japanese ambassadors to China. There were periods of frequent contacts as well as of lengthy intervals between contacts. This irregularity clearly indicated that, in its diplomacy with China, Japan set its own agenda and acted on self-interest to satisfy its own needs.

No Wo ambassador, for example, came to China during the second century. This interval continued well past the third century. Then within merely nine years, the female Wo ruler Himiko sent four ambassadors to the Wei court (220–265) in 238, 243, 245, and 247, respectively. After the death of Himiko, diplomatic contact with China slowed. Iyoo, the female successor to Himiko, contacted the Wei court only once. The fourth century was another quiet period in China–Wo relations except for the Wo delegation dispatched to the Western Jin court (265–316) in 306. With the arrival of a Wo ambassador at the Eastern Jin court (317–420) in 413, a new age of frequent diplomatic contact with China began. Over the next sixty years, ten Wo ambassadors called on the Southern Song court (420–479), and a Wo delegation also visited the Southern Qi court (479–502) in 479. The sixth century saw only one Wo ambassador pay respect to the Southern Liang court (502–557) in 502. When these ambassadors arrived in China, they acquired official titles, bronze mirrors, and military banners, which their masters could use to bolster their claims to political supremacy, to build a military system, and to attempt to expand its influence towards southern Korea.

=== Tuhua jianwen zhi ===
In the section on the Goryeo kingdom, within the sixth volume of his 圖畵見聞志; Tú huà jiànwén zhì; 'Depicted Records of Things Seen and Heard'—also known as Experiences in Painting—Guo Ruoxu (郭若虛) writes:

The Kingdom of Wa is also Japan [日本]. Its original name was Wa [倭], but became ashamed of that name. They claim themselves Japan [Origin of the Sun] because they are in the extremity of the East. Now they are vassal to Goryeo. (Note: 倭國乃日本國也，本名倭旣恥其名。又自以在極東因號日本也。今則臣屬高麗也。)

This could be referring to the numerous tributary missions sent to Goryeo by the Muromachi shogunate during the Nanboku-chō period to gain international recognition to establish legitimacy over the southern court, which originally had the better claim to legitimacy as it possessed the imperial regalia of Japan and the original Emperor Go-daigo. (In the later war-torn Sengoku period, various daimyo would send tributes to Goryeo to gain legitimacy over their rivals, even into the Joseon dynasty.)

=== Wa kingdoms ===
The Wa kingdoms on Kyushu were documented in the Civil war of Wa, which originated from a power struggle or political situation in the mid-2nd century CE. There were over 100 chiefdoms before the civil war. (Note: "Over a hundred" could mean uncountably many.) Afterward there were around 30 chiefdoms left that were ruled by shaman queen Himiko of Yamatai-koku (邪馬台国). Himiko restored peace and gained control of the region around 180 CE. (Note: Thirty is the number of chiefdoms ruled by Himiko.)

=== Shan Hai Jing ===
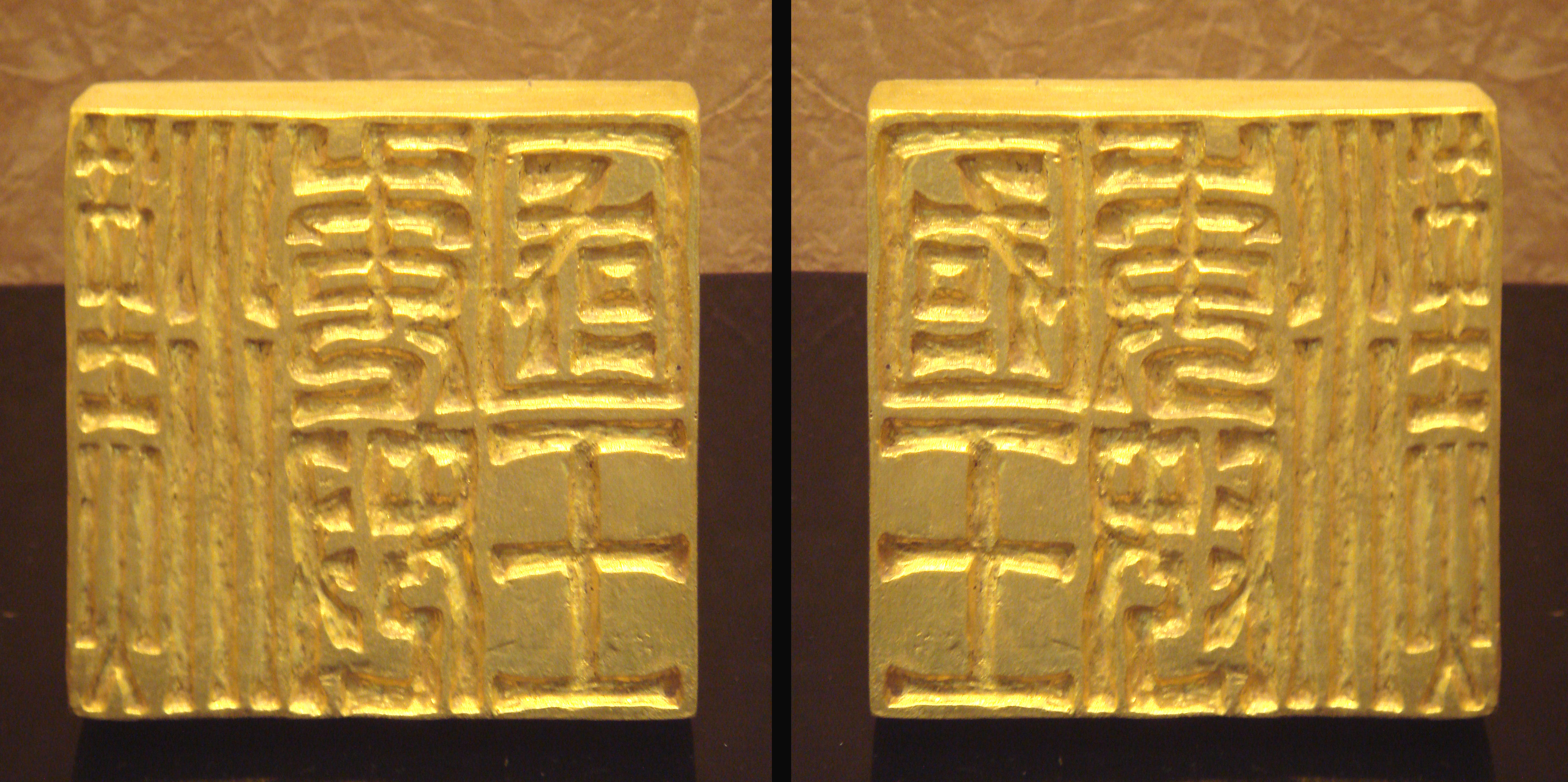
The golden seal said to have been granted to the 'King of Wa' by Emperor Guangwu of Han in 57 CE

Transcription of the seal. The seal reads 漢委奴國王; 'King of the Na state of the Wa vassal of Han'.

Possibly the earliest use of Wa occurs in the Shan Hai Jing. The actual date of this collection of geography and mythological legends is uncertain, but estimates range from 300 BCE to 250 CE. The 海內北經; Haineibei jing; 'Classic of Regions Within the North Sea' chapter includes Wa among foreign places both real (such as Korea) and legendary (e.g. Penglai Mountain).

The State of Gai is south of Great Yan and north of Wo. Wo belongs to Yan. Chaoxian [Chosŏn, Korea] is east of Lieyang, south of Haibei Mountain. Lieyang belongs to Yan. (Note: 蓋國在鉅燕南倭北倭屬燕 朝鮮在列陽東海北山南列陽屬燕)

Nakagawa notes that the label 鉅燕; Ju Yan refers to the kingdom of Yan (c. 1000–222 BCE), and that Wa ("Japan was first known by this name.") maintained a "possible tributary relationship" with Yan.

=== Lunheng ===
The Lunheng (論衡; 'Discourses Weighed in the Balance') is a compendium of essays written by Wang Chong c. 70–80 CE, on subjects including philosophy, religion, and the natural sciences.

The chapter within the Lunheng's titled 儒増; Rúzēng; 'Exaggerations of the Literati' mentions both 'Wa people' and 越裳; Yuèshāng, a people in the southern part of Guangdong province, near the Annamese frontier, presenting tribute during the Zhou dynasty. While disputing legends that ancient Zhou bronze ding tripods possessed magical power to ward off evil spirits, Wang says:

During the Zhou time there was universal peace. The [Yueshang] offered white pheasants to the court, the [Japanese] odoriferous plants. (Note: 周時天下太平，越裳獻白雉，倭人貢鬯草。) Since by eating these white pheasants or odoriferous plants one cannot keep free from evil influences, why should vessels like bronze tripods have such a power?

Another chapter titled 恢國; Huīguó; 'Restoring the Nation' similarly records that Emperor Cheng of Han (r. 51–7 BCE) was presented tributes of Vietnamese pheasants and Japanese herbs.

=== Book of Han ===
The c. 82 CE Han Shu (Book of Han) covers the Former Han dynasty (206 BCE – 24 CE) period. Near the conclusion of the Yan entry in the Dilizhi 地理志 ("Treatise on Geography") section, it records that "[Wa] encompassed over 100 [nations]".

Beyond Lo-lang in the sea, there are the people of Wo. They comprise more than one hundred communities. (Note: 樂浪海中有倭人分爲百餘國) It is reported that they have maintained intercourse with China through tributaries and envoys.

Emperor Wu of Han established this Korean Lelang Commandery in 108 BCE. Historian Endymion Wilkinson says Wa was used originally in the Hanshu, "probably to refer to the inhabitants of Kyushu and the Korean peninsula. Thereafter to the inhabitants of the Japanese archipelago."

=== Records of Wei ===
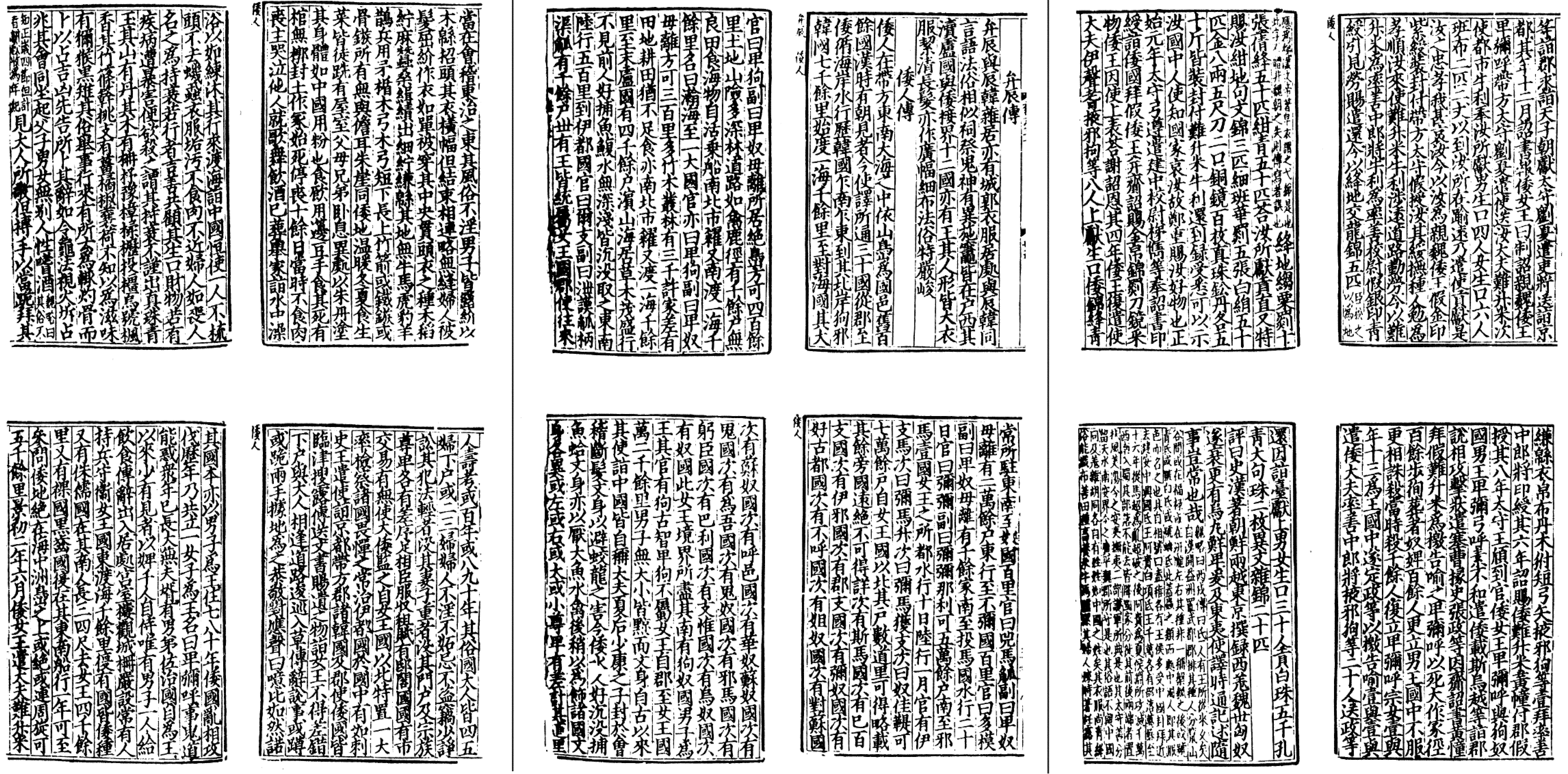
Text of the Wei Zhi

The c. 297 CE 魏志; Weìzhì; 'Records of Wei', the first of the Records of the Three Kingdoms, covers the history of Cao Wei (220–265 CE). The "Encounters with Eastern Barbarians" section describes the Wa people based upon detailed reports from Chinese envoys to Japan. It contains the first records of Yamatai-koku, shaman-queen Himiko, and other Japanese historical topics.

The people of Wa dwell in the middle of the ocean on the mountainous islands southeast of [the prefecture] of Tai-fang. They formerly comprised more than one hundred communities. During the Han dynasty, [Wa envoys] appeared at the Court; today, thirty of their communities maintain intercourse [with us] through envoys and scribes. (Note: 倭人在帯方東南大海之中依山爲國邑舊百餘國漢時有朝見者今使早譯所通三十國)

This Weizhi context describes sailing from Korea to Wa and around the Japanese archipelago. For instance:

A hundred li to the south, one reaches the country of Nu, the official of which is called shimako, his assistant being termed hinumori. Here there are more than twenty thousand households.

Tsunoda suggests this ancient 奴國; Núguó; 'slave country', Japanese Nakoku, was located near present-day Hakata in Kyushu.

Some 12,000 li to the south of Wa is 狗奴國; Gǒunúguó; 'dog slave country' [Japanese Kunakoku], which is identified with the Kumaso tribe that lived around Higo and Ōsumi Provinces in southern Kyushu. Beyond that:

Over one thousand li to the east of the Queen's land, there are more countries of the same race as the people of Wa. To the south, also there is the island of the dwarfs where the people are three or four feet tall. This is over four thousand li distant from the Queen's land. Then there is the land of the naked men, as well of the black-teethed people. (Note: 裸國黒齒國) These places can be reached by boat if one travels southeast for a year.

One Weizhi passage records that in 238 CE the Queen of Wa sent officials with tribute to the Wei emperor Cao Rui, who reciprocated with lavish gifts including a gold seal with the official title "Queen of Wa Friendly to Wei".

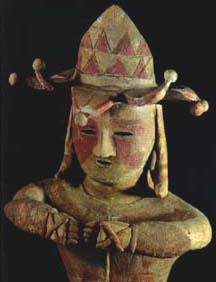
A tattooed Haniwa statue, Kamiyasaku Tomb, Fukushima Prefecture, 4th–6th century

Another passage relates Wa tattooing with legendary King Shao Kang of the Xia dynasty.

Men great and small, all tattoo their faces and decorate their bodies with designs. From olden times envoys who visited the Chinese Court called themselves "grandees". A son of the ruler Shao-k'ang of Hsia, when he was enfeoffed as lord of K'uai-chi, cut his hair and decorated his body with designs in order to avoid the attack of serpents and dragons. The Wa, who are fond of diving into the water to get fish and shells, also decorated their bodies in order to keep away large fish and waterfowl. Later, the designs became merely ornamental.

'Grandees' translates Chinese 大夫; dàfu; 'great man'', ''senior official'', ''statesman' (cf. modern 大夫; dàifu; 'physician'', ''doctor''), which mistranslates Japanese imperial 大夫, taifu, '5th-rank courtier', 'head of administrative department', 'grand tutor'. (The Nihongi records that the envoy Imoko was a taifu.)

A second Wei history, the c. 239–265 CE Weilüe is no longer extant, but some sections are quoted in the 429 CE Annotated Records of the Three Kingdoms by Pei Songzhi. He quotes the Weilüe, that "[Wa] people call themselves posterity of Tàibó". (Note: 倭人自謂太伯之後) Taibo was the uncle of King Wen of Zhou, who ceded the throne to his nephew and founded the ancient state of Wu (585–473 BCE). The Records of the Grand Historian has a section titled "Wu Taibo's Noble Family", and his shrine is located in present-day Wuxi. Researchers have noted cultural similarities between the ancient Wu state and Wō Japan including ritual tooth-pulling, back child carriers, and tattooing (represented with red paint on Japanese Haniwa statues).

=== Book of Later Han ===
The c. 432 CE Hou Han Shu (Book of the Later Han) covers the Later Han dynasty (25–220 CE), but was not compiled until two centuries later. The 'Wa people' are included under the "Encounters with Eastern Barbarians" section.

The Wa dwell on mountainous islands southeast of Tai-fang in the middle of the ocean, forming more than one hundred communities. (Note: 倭人在帯方東南大海之中依山爲國邑舊百餘國) From the time of the overthrow of Chao-hsien [northern Korea] by Emperor Wu (B.C. 140-87), nearly thirty of these communities have held intercourse with the Han [dynasty] court by envoys or scribes. Each community has its king, whose office is hereditary. The King of Great Wa resides in the country of Yamadai [邪馬台国].

Comparing the opening descriptions of Wa in the Wei Zhi and Hou Han Shu clearly reveals that the latter is derivative. Their respective accounts of the dwarf, naked, and black-teethed peoples provide another example of copying.

Leaving the queen's land and crossing the sea to the east, after a voyage of one thousand li, the country of Kunu [狗奴國] ("Country of Dog-slaves") is reached, the people of which are of the same race as that of the Wa. They are not the queen's subjects, however. Four thousand li away to the south of the queen's land, the dwarf's country is reached; its inhabitants are three to four feet in height. After a year's voyage by ship to the southeast of the dwarf's country, one comes to the land of naked men and also to the country of black-teethed people; (Note: 裸國黑齒國) here our communication service ends.

This Hou Han Shu account of Japan contains some historical details not found in the Wei Zhi.

[In 57 CE], the Wa country Nu [倭奴國] sent an envoy with tribute who called himself ta-fu [大夫]. This country is located in the southern extremity of the Wa country. Kuang-wu bestowed on him a seal. In ... [107 CE], during the reign of An-ti (107-125), the King of Wa presented one hundred sixty slaves, making at the same time a request for an imperial audience.

Tsunoda notes support for the Hakata location of Nu/Na country in the 1784 discovery at Hakata Bay of a gold seal bearing the inscription 漢委奴國王, usually translated "Han [vassal?] King of the Wa country Nu". Although the name of the King of Wa in 107 CE does not appear in the above translation, his name is Suishō (帥升) according to the original text.

=== Book of Song ===
The 488 CE Song Shu ("Book of Song") covers the brief history of the Liu Song dynasty (420–479) during the chaotic Six Dynasties period. Under the "Eastern and Southern Barbarians" section, right after Baekje, Japan is listed as "Wa country", and is said to be located off Goguryeo. In contrast with the earlier histories that describe the Wa as a 'people', this Song history describes them as a "country".

The country of Wa is in the midst of the great ocean, southeast of Goguryeo. From generation to generation, [the Wa people] carry out their duty of bringing tribute. (Note: 倭國在高驪東南大海中世修貢職) [In 421,] the first Emperor said in a rescript: "Ts'an [贊, Emperor Nintoku (r. 313–319)] of Wa sends tribute from a distance of tens of thousands of li 里. The fact that he is loyal, though so far away, deserves appreciation. Let him, therefore, be granted rank and title." ... In [438] Ts'an died and his brother, Chen [珍, Emperor Hanzei (r. ca. 406–411)], came to power, the latter sent an envoy to the Court with tribute. Self-proclaiming as King of Wa, Overseer of All Military Affairs in the Six Countries of Wa, Baekje, Silla, Imna, Jin-han and Mok-han; and Grand Peacekeeper-General of the East (安東大將軍). He presented a memorial requesting that these [self-proclaimed] titles be formally confirmed. An imperial edict was issued [only recognizing him as] King of Wa and Peacekeeper-General of the East. ... In the twentieth year [443], Sai [濟, Emperor Ingyō (r. ca. 412–453)], King of Wa, sent an envoy with tribute and was reaffirmed as King of Wa; and Peacekeeper-General of the East. In the twenty-eighth year [451], the additional title was granted of Peacekeeper-General of the East; Overseer of All Military Affairs in the Six Countries of Wa, Silla, Imna, Gaya, Jin-han and Mok-han. ... Sai died, his crown prince Kou [興, Emperor Ankō (r. ca. 453–456)] sends tribute... In [468] Kou dies, his younger brother Bu [武, Emperor Yūryaku (r. ca. 456–479)] comes to power, self-proclaiming himself as Peacekeeper-General of the East; Overser of All Military Affairs in the Seven Countries of Wa, Baekje, Silla, Imna, Gaya, Jin-han and Mok-han. ... In [478] offered a letter saying, "Our landed country is far, forming a vassalage far away, we have had no comfort since we had to arm ourselves with helmet and armor and trek across mountains and streams. ... "

It should be noted, this period in Chinese history was when China was split roughly into North and South and fiercely competing for legitimacy themselves, and so were eager to accept as many foreign countries and land as many foreign monarchs as possible.

The Song Shu gives details Japan visiting Liu Song often, indicating that the Wa kings were desperate for their political legitimization from the Chinese emperors, asking for confirmation of titles every time the throne was succeeded. Liu Song itself has not recognized Japan's exaggerated claims over Baekje, as it had already had diplomatic ties with and in 420 already recognized Baekje's Jeonji as the Grand Suppressor-General of the East (鎮東大將軍). Liu Song recognized the emperors as the self-proclaimed title Kings of Wa but refused to recognize them by their likewise self-proclaimed title of 安東大將軍, which is a position in Grade 2 (二品) in the Liu Song hierarchy, but instead as a grade lower, as Grade 3 (三品) Peacekeeper-General of the East.

Wang Jianqun (王健群), pointed out that Wa's frequent requests for recognition undermine credence to their claim; many of their self-proclaimed titles were rejected and they were given a lower grade title. Noh Jungkuk (노중국) further pointed out many of the Wa requests seem to originate from a monarch who does not even know the situation of the places he claims to rule. He asks for redundant recognition of command over Imna and Gaya which probably describe the same area; he proclaims rulership of Mok-han, which had been annexed into Baekje 100 years prior, rendering the Wa claim redundant; and proclaims rule over Jinhan, which was a confederacy whose constituents had been individually annexed into Silla between 200 and 400 years prior. This is also redundant alongside laying claim to Silla (traditionally a bitter enemy with Wa).

In 479, as a celebratory gesture and to establish legitimacy through the diplomatic position as granter of titles in the sinosphere, the newborn Southern Qi dynasty would give out titles without being prompted, such as voluntarily entitling the King of Wa to what Baekje was already entitled by Liu Song in 420, the Grand Suppressor-General of the East (鎮東大將軍). In 502, the newborn Liang dynasty would make similar celebratory gestures, giving out titles such as Conqueror-General of the East (征東將軍) to the King of Wa, while entitling Dongseong of Baekje to Grand Conqueror-General of the East (征東大將軍) the same year, unaware that both have deceased.

=== Book of Liang ===
The 635 CE Liang Shu 梁書 "Book of Liang", which covers history of the Liang dynasty (502–557), records the Buddhist monk Hui Shen's trip to Wa and the legendary Fusang. It refers to Japan as Wa without a 'people' or 'country' suffix, under the "Eastern Barbarians" section, and begins with the Taibo legend.

The Wa say of themselves that they are posterity of Tàibó. According to custom, the people are all tattooed. Their territory is over 12,000 li from Daifang. It is located approximately east of Kuaiji [on Hangzhou Bay], though at an extremely great distance. (Note: 倭者自云太伯之後俗皆文身去帶方萬二千餘里大抵在會稽之東相去絶遠)

Later texts repeat this myth of Japanese descent from Taibo. The 648 CE Jin Shu ("Book of Jin") about the Jin dynasty (266–420 CE) uses a different "call" verb, wèi 謂 "say; call; name" instead of yún 云 "say; speak; call", "They call themselves the posterity of Tàibó [自謂太伯之後]". The 1084 CE Chinese universal history Zizhi Tongjian speculates, "The present-day Japan is also said to be posterity of Tàibó of Wu; perhaps when Wu was destroyed, [a member of] a collateral branch of the royal family disappeared at sea and became Wo.". (Note: 今日本又云吳太伯之後蓋吳亡其支庶入海為倭)

=== Book of Sui ===
The 636 CE Sui Shu ("Book of Sui") records the history of the Sui dynasty (581–618) when China was reunified. Wōguó/Wakoku is entered under "Eastern Barbarians", and said to be located off of Baekje and Silla (see Hogong), two of the Three Kingdoms of Korea.

Wa-kuo is situated in the middle of the great ocean southeast of Baekje and Silla, three thousand li away by water and land. The people dwell on mountainous islands. (Note: 倭國在百濟新羅東南水陸三千里於大海之中依山島而居) During the Wei dynasty, over thirty countries [of Wa], each of which boasted a king, held intercourse with China. These barbarians do not know how to measure distance by li and estimate it by days. Their domain is five months' journey from east to west, and three months' from north to south; and the sea lies on all sides. The land is high in the east and low in the west.

In 607 CE, the Sui Shu records that "King Tarishihoko" (a mistake for Empress Suiko) sent an envoy, Buddhist monks, and tribute to Emperor Yang. Her official message is quoted using the word Tiānzǐ 天子 'Son of Heaven', 'emperor'.

"The Son of Heaven in the land where the sun rises addresses a letter to the Son of Heaven in the land where the sun sets. We hope you are in good health." When the Emperor saw this letter, he was displeased and told the chief official of foreign affairs that this letter from the barbarians was discourteous, and that such a letter should not again be brought to his attention.

In 608, the Emperor dispatched Pei Ching as envoy to Wa, and he returned with a Japanese delegation.

The Japanese Nihongi also records these imperial envoys of 607 and 608, but with a differing Sino-Japanese historical perspective. It records more details, such as naming the envoy Imoko Wono no Omi and translator Kuratsukuri no Fukuri, but not the offensive Chinese translation. According to the Nihongi, when Imoko returned from China, he apologized to Suiko for losing Yang's letter because Korean men "searched me and took it from me". When the Empress received Pei, he presented a proclamation contrasting Chinese Huángdì 皇帝 'emperor' with Wōwáng 倭王 'Wa king', "The Emperor greets the King of Wa." According to the Nihongi, Suiko gave Pei a different version of the imperial letter, contrasting Japanese Tennō 天皇 'Japanese emperor' and Kōtei 皇帝 'emperor' (Chinese tiānhuáng and huángdì) instead of using "Son of Heaven".

The Emperor of the East respectfully addresses the Emperor of the West. Your Envoy, P'ei Shih-ch'ing, Official Entertainer of the Department of foreign receptions, and his suite, having arrived here, my long-harbored cares were dissolved. This last month of autumn is somewhat chilly. How is Your Majesty? We trust well. We are in our usual health.

Aston quotes the 797 CE Shoku Nihongi history that this 607 Japanese mission to China first objected to writing Wa with the Chinese character 倭.

"Wono no Imoko, the Envoy who visited China, (proposed to) alter this term into Nippon, but the Sui Emperor ignored his reasons and would not allow it. The term Nippon was first used in the period [...] 618–626." Another Chinese authority gives 670 as the date when Nippon began to be officially used in China.

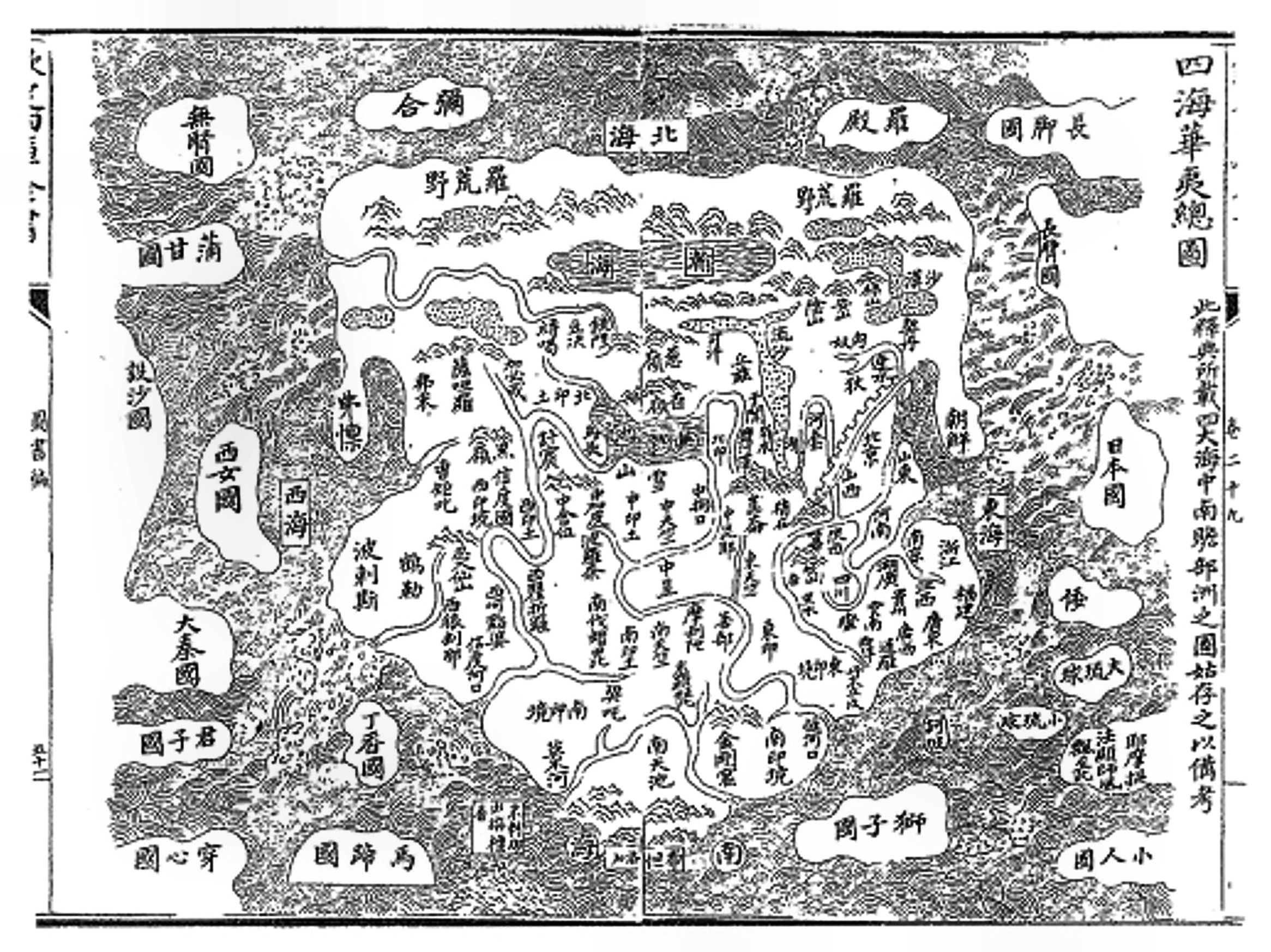
The island of "Wa" (probably modern Kyushu) is depicted below the island of "Japanese country" (日本國, probably modern Honshu) and above the Ryukyu Islands (大琉球) on the right-hand side of the Sihai Huayi Zongtu, a 16th-century Chinese world map.

=== Old Book of Tang ===
The custom of writing "Japan" as Wa ended during the Tang dynasty. Japanese scribes coined the name Nihon or Nippon c. 608–645 and replaced Wa with a more flattering 和, Wa, 'harmony, peace' c. 756–757 CE. This linguistic change is recorded in two official Tang histories. The 945 CE Old Book of Tang (199A) has the oldest Chinese reference to 日本; Rìběn. The "Eastern Barbarians" section lists both Wakoku and Nipponkoku, giving three explanations: Nippon is an alternate name for Wa, or the Japanese disliked Wakoku because it was 不雅; 'inelegant'', ''coarse', or Japan was once a small part of old Wakoku. The 1050 CE New Book of Tang which has a 日本; Rìběn heading for Japan under the "Eastern Barbarians", gives more details.

Japan in former times was called Wa-nu. It is 14,000 li distant from our capital, situated to the southeast of Silla in the middle of the ocean. It is five months' journey to cross Japan from east to west, and a three-month journey from south to north. (Note: 日本古倭奴也去京師萬四千里直新羅東南在海中島而居東西五月行南北三月行)

Regarding the change in autonyms, the Xin Tang Shu says.

[In 670], an embassy came to the Court [from Japan] to offer congratulations on the conquest of Koguryŏ. Around this time, the Japanese who had studied Chinese came to dislike the name Wa and changed it to Nippon. According to the words of the [Japanese] envoy himself, that name was chosen because the country was so close to where the sun rises. (Note: 後稍習夏音惡倭名更號日本使者自言國近日所出以為名) Some say, [on the other hand,] that Japan was a small country which had been subjugated by the Wa, and that the latter took over its name. As this envoy was not truthful, doubt still remains. (Note: 或雲日本乃小國為倭所並故冒其號使者不以情故疑焉) [The envoy] was, besides, boastful, and he said that the domains of his country were many thousands of square li and extended to the ocean on the south and on the west. In the northeast, he said, the country was bordered by mountain ranges beyond which lay the land of the hairy men.

Subsequent Chinese histories refer to Japan as 日本; Rìběn and only mention Wa as an old name.

=== Gwanggaeto Stele ===
The earliest Korean reference to Japanese Wa (Wae in Korean) is the 414 CE Gwanggaeto Stele that was erected to honor King Gwanggaeto the Great of Goguryeo (r. 391–413 CE). This memorial stele, which has the oldest usage of Wakō (倭寇, "Japanese pirates", Waegu in Korean), records Wa as a military ally of Baekje in their battles with Goguryeo and Silla. Some scholars interpret these references to mean not only 'Japanese' but also 'Gaya peoples' in the southern Korean Peninsula. For instance, Lee suggests:

If Kokuryo could not destroy Baekje itself, it wished for someone else to do so. Thus, in another sense, the inscription may have been wishful thinking. At any rate, Wae denoted both the southern Koreans and people who lived on the southwest Japanese islands, the same Kaya people who had ruled both regions in ancient times. Wae did not denote Japan alone, as was the case later.

"It is generally thought that these Wae were from the archipelago," write Lewis and Sesay, "but we as yet have no conclusive evidence concerning their origins".

== Notes ==
Language notes

General notes
