= Ranged Marquis =

Chinese noble title

Ranged Marquis (Chinese: 列侯; pinyin: Liè Hóu, originally Chinese: 徹侯; pinyin: Chè Hóu) was a rank of the Chinese nobility that existed from the Warring States period to the Chen dynasty.

== Warring States period and Qin dynasty ==
During the Warring States period, most states had moved away from the primarily kin-based conception of political dynamics dating back to the Western Zhou, and began to abolish the fengjian system. This was replaced by the junxian system, with commanderies (郡, jun) and districts (縣, xian). Under this new administrative regime, sovereigns created new titles such as Ranged Marquises and Lords (君) who taxed on their feeding fief (食邑). The Qin dynasty established the Twenty Ranks of Peerage Hierarchy (二十等爵制) after Shang Yang's reforms, and the Ranged Marquis was the highest rank in all twenty ranks. A Ranged Marquis is granted a feeding fief, which only he could tax on, and not an inheritable fief. Different awards were assigned to vassals according to their military exploits: large fiefs of districts, small fiefs of townships (鄉), or tiny fiefs of neighbourhoods (亭).

Secondary Marquis (關內侯, marquis "within the passes", referring to the cultural homeland) was the second rank under Ranged Marquis in the Twenty Ranks of Peerage Hierarchy.

== Han dynasty ==
The Han dynasty inherited all twenty ranks of peerage hierarchy as established by the Qin dynasty. Ranged Marquis was the highest title of nobility for subjects who were not from the imperial family of the Han dynasty. Its original name was 徹侯 (Chè Hóu), and was changed to 通侯 (Tōng Hóu) or 列侯 (Liè Hóu) because of a naming taboo on Emperor Wu of Han's name, Liú Chè (劉徹). The three distinct titles were administratively identical.

=== Western Han dynasty ===
Ranged Marquis was the highest title a non-royal person could achieve. They would receive a golden seal with a purple ribbon. The number of taxable households varied greatly among marquisates. The smaller marquisates had only hundreds of households, but the larger marquisates may have more than ten thousand households such as those of Marquis of Guanjun (冠軍侯) and Marquis of Changping (長平侯). Marquisates were administered by a counselor-delegate (國相 Guó Xiàng) as a magistrate (令, 長) in his district. The land owners could appoint their courtier-officers: household aide (家丞 Jiā Chéng), drafter (舍人 Shè Rén), Grand Master of Gates (門大夫 Mén Dà Fū), Frontrider (洗馬 Xǐ Mǎ), messenger (行人 Xíngrén), etc. Those marquises who did not hold office in the central government and were not married to an imperial princess were required to leave the capital, Chang'an, and move to their peerage. The Commandant of the Nobles (主爵中尉) supervised peers in the imperial capital, and commandery governors (太守) supervised marquises in their fiefs.

At first, Emperor Gaozu of Han, had said in the covenant of Baima "If one gets a marquisate without military exploits, all people must attack him." This guidance was ignored, and instead powerful men like the prime minister (丞相) and consort kin – family heads whose daughters married into the imperial house – were enfeoffed while lacking military accomplishment.

=== Eastern Han dynasty ===
There were five ranks of Ranged Marquis during the Eastern Han period. They were District Marquis (縣侯), Capital Township Marquis (都鄉侯), Township Marquis (鄉侯), Capital Neighborhood Marquis (都亭侯), and Neighborhood Marquis (亭侯). Marquises of Township or Neighborhood had staff but no marquisate: only District Marquises had marquisates, as in the Western Han. In normal conditions, marquisates whose owners died without sons would be revoked by the emperor, but close relatives could inherit the title in certain circumstances. Because Emperors of the Eastern Han had granted liberally a large number of lower tiered marquis titles, there was a large gap between ranks. The ranks among ranged marquises depended on their honorary titles or the number of households in their feeding fief.

== Three Kingdoms period ==
=== Cao Wei dynasty ===
The early Cao Wei dynasty has accepted the nobility titles of the Eastern Han. But Sima Zhao, the King of Jin (or Prince of Jin), created Five ranks of Peerage Hierarchy (五等爵制) to replace the ranged marquis grade as the top noble titles in 264. Ranged Marquises had been preserved as lower titles for no-royal-family people, and the district marquises existed in both ranged marquises and five ranks of peerage hierarchy until the Liu Song dynasty.

=== Shu Han and Eastern Wu dynasties ===
The hierarchy of Ranged Marquis in Shu Han and Eastern Wu was the same as that of the Eastern Han.

== Jin dynasty ==
The Jin dynasty inherited the noble titles of Cao Wei including the twenty ranks of peerage hierarchy and the five ranks of peerage hierarchy. During this period, ranged marquises were divided into three grades: District Marquises, Township Marquises and Neighborhood Marquises. Marquises lost marquisates but kept feeding fiefs and courtiers such as household aide (家丞 Jiā Chéng) and cadet (庶子 Shù Zǐ). The five peers rank in the first rank and the second rank respectively, while district marquises represent the third rank, township marquises as the fourth and neighborhood marquises as the fifth.

== Southern dynasties period ==
The nobility system of the Liu Song dynasty is the same as that of the Jin dynasty. The Southern Qi dynasty abolished the District Marquis grade of ranged marquises. The remaining two marquis grade is the eighth rank of nobility hierarchy in the Chen dynasty. The Sui dynasty conquered the Chen dynasty and abolished the last ranged marquises in 589.
