= Nakoku =

Ancient state located around modern day Fukuoka city

The King of Na gold seal granted to the king of Nakoku by Emperor Guangwu of Han.

map illustrating the path from the Daifeng commandery to Yamatai, and its distances in the Wajinden.

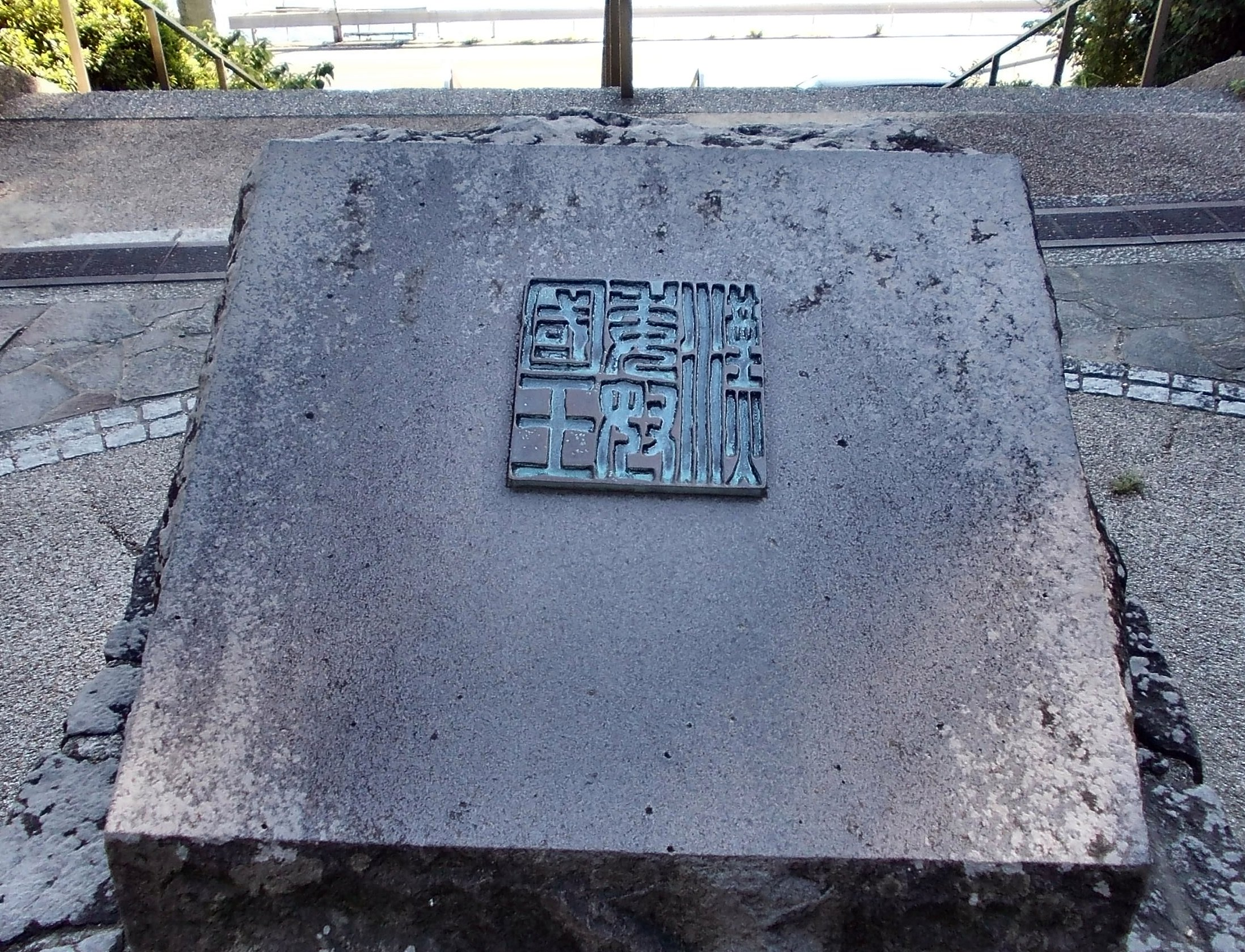
The golden block seal at Kin-in Park in Shikanoshima Island

Nakoku (奴国, Nakoku, Na-no-Kuni) was a state which was located in and around modern-day Fukuoka City, on the Japanese island of Kyūshū, from the 1st to early 3rd centuries. Much of what is known about it comes from ancient records of both China and Japan.

According to the Book of the Later Han, in 57 CE, Emperor Guangwu of Han granted Nakoku an imperial seal, patterned after the Chinese jade seals, but made of gold: the king of Na gold seal. In return, that same year, Na sent envoys to the Chinese capital, offering tribute and formal New Year's greetings. This seal was discovered over 1500 years later, by an Edo period farmer on Shikanoshima Island, thus helping to verify the existence of Nakoku, which was otherwise known only from the ancient chronicles. Engraved upon it are the Chinese characters 漢委奴國王 (Kan no Wa no Na-no-Koku-ō, "King of the Na state of the Wa (vassal) of Han".

Na probably reached its highest point during the first century then eventually declined, the causes of this decline are unclear.

A reference is found in vol. 30 of the Chinese Book of Wei from the Records of the Three Kingdoms, titled "The Account of the Easterners: A Note on the Wa" (Chinese: 東夷傳‧倭人條), to the continued existence of Nakoku in the 3rd century, naming the officials and stating that it contains over 20,000 homes. This section is known in Japan as the Gishi Wajinden (魏志倭人伝; Records of Wei: An Account of the Wa).

Some believe that Nakoku may also correspond to Na-no-Agata (儺県), a principality which preceded Fukuoka City.

== See also ==
- Na and Wa (倭)
- names of Japan

== Notes and references ==
- Much of the content of this article is derived from that on the corresponding article on the Japanese Wikipedia. Transcriptions of the relevant portions from the ancient texts can be found there as well.
- Cobbing, Andrew (2009). Kyūshū, gateway to Japan: a concise history. ISBN 978-1-905246-18-2.
- Frederic, Louis. "Nakoku." Japan Encyclopedia. Cambridge: Harvard University Press, 2002.
