= List of earthquakes in 2005 =

Earthquakes in 2005
Approximate epicenters of notable earthquakes in 2005
- 4.0–5.9 magnitude
- 6.0–6.9 magnitude
- 7.0–7.9 magnitude
- 8.0+ magnitude
- Strongest: M_{w} 8.6 Indonesia
- Deadliest: M_{w} 7.6 (Pakistan) Pakistan; 88,714 deaths
- Total fatalities: 91,356

Number by magnitude
- 9.0+: 0
- 8.0–8.9: 1
- 7.0–7.9: 10
- 6.0–6.9: 139
- 5.0–5.9: 1,694
- 4.0–4.9: 13,893

This is a list of earthquakes in 2005. Only earthquakes of magnitude 6 or above are included, unless they result in significant damage and/or casualties. All dates are listed according to UTC time. The maximum intensities are based on the Modified Mercalli intensity scale. Earthquake magnitudes are based on data from the United States Geological Survey. The year 2005 had 11 major earthquakes, lower than previous years. Despite this, the year was extremely deadly for earthquakes, with over 91,300 fatalities. More than 88,700 of them came from the 2005 Kashmir earthquake, the second-deadliest earthquake of the 21st century, which caused catastrophic damage in northern Pakistan and nearby communities in India. The largest earthquake of the year, a M_{w} 8.6 earthquake located west of Sumatra in Indonesia, killed over 1,700 people in Aceh and North Sumatra provinces, most of them in multiple islands off Sumatra's western coastline. Other deadly earthquakes also occurred in Iran, China, Peru, and Chile.

== Compared to other years ==
Number of earthquakes worldwide for 1999–2009 []
Magnitude	1999	2000	2001	2002	2003	2004	2005	2006	2007	2008	2009
8.0–9.9	0	1	1	0	1	2	1	2	4	1	1
7.0–7.9	18	15	14	13	14	14	10	9	14	12	16
6.0–6.9	117	145	122	126	139	141	139	142	178	167	143
5.0–5.9	1,057	1,334	1,212	1,170	1,212	1,511	1,694	1,726	2,090	1,786	1,912
4.0–4.9	7,004	7,968	7,969	8,479	8,455	10,880	13,893	12,843	12,081	12,294	6,817
Total	8,296	9,462	9,319	9,788	9,823	12,551	15,738	14,723	14,367	14,261	8,891

== By death toll ==
Rank	Death toll	Magnitude	Location	MMI	Depth (km)	Date	Event
1	88,714	7.6	Pakistan, Azad Kashmir	XI (Extreme)	15.0	October 8	2005 Kashmir earthquake
2	1,738	8.6	Indonesia, Aceh	X (Extreme)	30.0	March 28	2005 Nias–Simeulue earthquake
3	799	6.4	Iran, Kerman	VIII (Severe)	15.5	February 22	2005 Zarand earthquake
4	21	5.2	China, Jiangxi	VII (Very strong)	11.1	November 26	2005 Ruichang earthquake
5	20	7.5	Peru, Loreto	VI (Strong)	115.0	September 26	2005 Northern Peru earthquake
6	13	5.9	Iran, Hormozgan	VII (Very strong)	10.0	November 27	2005 Qeshm earthquake
7	11	7.8	Chile, Tarapacá	X (Extreme)	115.6	June 13	2005 Tarapacá earthquake

Listed are earthquakes with at least 10 reported fatalities.

=== By magnitude ===
Rank	Magnitude	Death toll	Location	MMI	Depth (km)	Date	Event
1	8.6	1,738	Indonesia, Aceh	X (Extreme)	30.0	March 28	2005 Nias–Simeulue earthquake
2	7.8	11	Chile, Tarapacá	X (Extreme)	115.6	June 13	2005 Tarapacá earthquake
3	7.6	88,714	Pakistan, Azad Kashmir	XI (Extreme)	15.0	October 8	2005 Kashmir earthquake
3	7.6	0	Papua New Guinea, New Ireland offshore	VIII (Severe)	90.0	September 9	-
5	7.5	20	Peru, Loreto	VI (Strong)	115.0	September 26	2005 Northern Peru earthquake
6	7.2	0	United States, California offshore	V (Moderate)	16.0	June 15	-
6	7.2	0	India, Andaman and Nicobar Islands offshore	VI (Strong)	16.0	July 24	-
6	7.2	0	Japan, Miyagi offshore	VII (Very strong)	36.0	August 16	2005 Miyagi earthquake
9	7.1	2	Indonesia, Celebes Sea	III (Weak)	525.0	February 5	-
9	7.1	0	Indonesia, Maluku offshore	V (Moderate)	201.7	March 2	-
11	7.0	0	Japan, Miyagi offshore	IV (Light)	11.0	November 14	-

Listed are earthquakes with at least 7.0 magnitude.

== By month ==
=== January ===
January
- Strongest: M_{w} 6.8 Central Mid-Atlantic Ridge
- Deadliest: M_{w} 5.9 Turkey; 2 deaths
- Total fatalities: 2

Number by magnitude
- 9.0+: 0
- 8.0–8.9: 0
- 7.0–7.9: 0
- 6.0–6.9: 23
- 5.0–5.9: 308
- 4.0–4.9: 1,793

Date	Country and location	M_{w}	Depth (km)	MMI	Notes	Casualties	
Date	Country and location	M_{w}	Depth (km)	MMI	Notes	Dead	Injured
1	India, Andaman and Nicobar Islands offshore, 339 km (211 mi) W of Banda Aceh, Indonesia	6.7	11.7	-	Aftershocks of the 2004 Indian Ocean earthquake.	-	-
1	India, Andaman and Nicobar Islands offshore, 187 km (116 mi) NNW of Sabang, Indonesia	6.1	14.0	VII	Aftershocks of the 2004 Indian Ocean earthquake.	-	-
2	India, Andaman and Nicobar Islands offshore, 284 km (176 mi) W of Sabang, Indonesia	6.4	30.0	V	Aftershocks of the 2004 Indian Ocean earthquake.	-	-
3	Australia, Macquarie Island offshore	6.1	10.0	-	-	-	-
4	India, Andaman and Nicobar Islands offshore, 118 km (73 mi) SSW of Port Blair	6.1	23.2	VIII	Aftershock of the 2004 Indian Ocean earthquake.	-	-
8	South Georgia and the South Sandwich Islands offshore, South Sandwich Islands region	6.0	10.0	-	-	-	-
9	Indonesia, Aceh offshore, 72 km (45 mi) SSW of Banda Aceh	6.1	40.0	V	Aftershock of the 2004 Indian Ocean earthquake.	-	-
10	Iran, Golestan, 31 km (19 mi) NNE of Gorgan	5.4	31.9	VII	At least 110 people injured in Gorgan.	-	110
10	Turkey, Mugla, 23 km (14 mi) SE of Güvercinlik	5.5	15.9	VII	One person injured in Marmaris.	-	1
12	Central Mid-Atlantic Ridge	6.8	10.0	-	-	-	-
14	Papua New Guinea, New Ireland, 51 km (32 mi) ENE of Kokopo	6.1	10.0	IX	-	-	-
15	Indonesia, Banten offshore, 66 km (41 mi) W of Labuan	6.0	58.7	V	-	-	-
16	Tonga, Tongatapu offshore, 485 km (301 mi) SSW of ʻOhonua	6.2	16.0	-	-	-	-
16	Federated States of Micronesia, Yap offshore, 133 km (83 mi) NNE of Fais	6.6	24.9	I	-	-	-
17	Federated States of Micronesia, Yap offshore, 136 km (85 mi) N of Fais	6.1	24.9	-	Aftershock of the 6.6 event.	-	-
18	Japan, Hokkaido offshore, 40 km (25 mi) E of Kushiro	6.3	42.0	VI	Aftershock of the 7.0 event on November 28, 2004.	-	-
19	Japan, Chiba offshore, 161 km (100 mi) SE of Katsuura	6.6	27.8	V	A 30 cm (12 in) high tsunami was observed at Miyake-jima.	-	-
21	Ecuador, Manabí, 21 km (13 mi) WSW of Montecristi	6.0	10.0	IX	-	-	-
22	Solomon Islands, Isabel offshore, 47 km (29 mi) NNW of Buala	6.4	29.0	VII	-	-	-
23	Indonesia, Central Sulawesi, 32 km (20 mi) SSE of Palu	6.3	11.0	VIII	One person killed, four injured and 136 buildings damaged in Palu. Hot springs formed in Bobo, Sigi Regency.	1	4
24	India, Andaman and Nicobar Islands offshore, 352 km (219 mi) WNW of Sabang, Indonesia	6.3	30.0	I	Aftershock of the 2004 Indian Ocean earthquake.	-	-
24	Ecuador, Manabí offshore, 23 km (14 mi) W of Jipijapa	6.1	16.9	VIII	Some homes collapsed at Puerto López. Some homes damaged and landslides occurred at Salango.	-	-
25	China, Yunnan, 59 km (37 mi) N of Jinghong	4.8	12.0	VII	Three people injured and some homes damaged in Simao.	-	3
25	Turkey, Hakkâri, 6 km (3.7 mi) NNW of Hakkâri	5.9	41.2	VII	Two people killed, 22 injured and 80 buildings damaged in Hakkâri.	2	22
26	Indonesia, Aceh offshore, 199 km (124 mi) W of Sinabang	6.2	22.2	-	Aftershock of the 2004 Indian Ocean earthquake.	-	-
28	Ecuador, Manabí offshore, 90 km (56 mi) WSW of Manta	6.1	10.0	V	-	-	-
28	Ecuador, Manabí offshore, 51 km (32 mi) WSW of Manta	6.2	10.0	VI	-	-	-
29	Spain, Murcia, 19 km (12 mi) SW of Bullas	4.4	5.0	VI	At least 565 homes damaged in La Paca and Zarcilla de Ramos.	-	-

=== February ===
February
- Strongest: M_{w} 7.1 Philippines
- Deadliest: M_{w} 6.4 Iran; 799 deaths
- Total fatalities: 802

Number by magnitude
- 9.0+: 0
- 8.0–8.9: 0
- 7.0–7.9: 1
- 6.0–6.9: 15
- 5.0–5.9: 133
- 4.0–4.9: 898

Date	Country and location	M_{w}	Depth (km)	MMI	Notes	Casualties	
Date	Country and location	M_{w}	Depth (km)	MMI	Notes	Dead	Injured
2	Guam offshore, 63 km (39 mi) NNW of Yigo Village	6.3	158.7	VII	-	-	-
2	Indonesia, West Java, 9 km (5.6 mi) NE of Paseh	4.8	15.0	V	One person killed, several injured, many buildings damaged or destroyed and power outages in Garut Regency.	1	Several
5	Northern Mariana Islands, Northern Islands offshore, 89 km (55 mi) N of Saipan	6.6	142.7	VI	-	-	-
5	Indonesia, Aceh offshore, 156 km (97 mi) W of Sinabang	6.0	30.0	-	Aftershock of the 2004 Indian Ocean earthquake.	-	-
5	Philippines, Soccsksargen offshore, 138 km (86 mi) SW of Palimbang	7.1	525.0	III	Two people killed in Sabah, Malaysia.	2	-
7	Papua New Guinea, New Ireland offshore, 103 km (64 mi) E of Kokopo	6.1	36.5	VIII	-	-	-
8	Vanuatu, Torba offshore, 52 km (32 mi) SW of Sola	6.7	206.3	IV	-	-	-
9	Indonesia, Aceh offshore, 85 km (53 mi) SSW of Banda Aceh	6.0	44.5	IV	Aftershock of the 2004 Indian Ocean earthquake.	-	-
9	Japan, Bonin Islands offshore	6.3	24.0	I	-	-	-
10	New Caledonia, South offshore, 183 km (114 mi) ESE of Vao	6.3	9.0	-	-	-	-
14	China, Xinjiang, 92 km (57 mi) NW of Aksu	6.1	22.0	VIII	At least 6,000 homes damaged or destroyed in Uqturpan County.	-	-
15	Indonesia, North Sulawesi offshore, 128 km (80 mi) SE of Sarangani, Philippines	6.5	39.7	VII	-	-	-
15	Japan, Saitama, 2 km (1.2 mi) NW of Iwatsuki	5.5	46.2	VI	Seven people injured each in Ibaraki and Chiba, six each in Tokyo and Saitama, and one in Kanagawa Prefectures.	-	27
19	Indonesia, Southeast Sulawesi offshore, 81 km (50 mi) SSW of Katabu	6.5	10.0	VIII	-	-	-
22	Iran, Kerman, 24 km (15 mi) ESE of Zarand	6.4	14.0	VIII	Further information: 2005 Zarand earthquake	799	5,000
23	Papua New Guinea, West New Britain offshore, 96 km (60 mi) SE of Kimbe	6.0	10.0	VII	-	-	-
26	Indonesia, Aceh offshore, 99 km (62 mi) WNW of Sinabang	6.8	36.0	VIII	Aftershock of the 2004 Indian Ocean earthquake.	-	-

=== March ===
March
- Strongest: M_{w} 8.6 Indonesia
- Deadliest: M_{w} 8.6 Indonesia; 1,738 deaths
- Total fatalities: 1,741

Number by magnitude
- 9.0+: 0
- 8.0–8.9: 1
- 7.0–7.9: 1
- 6.0–6.9: 14
- 5.0–5.9: 184
- 4.0–4.9: 1,367

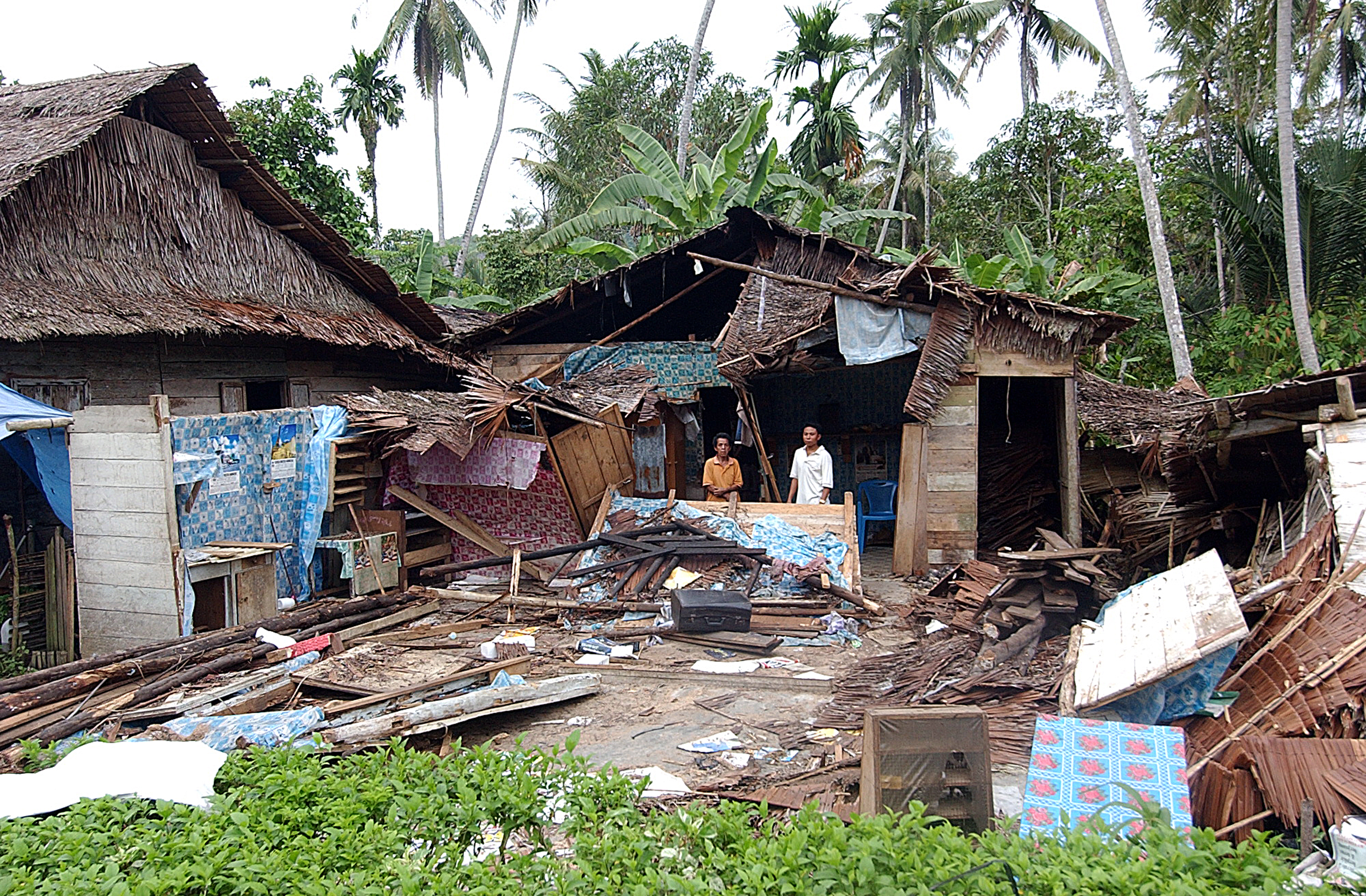
A collapsed house in Nias, Indonesia

Date	Country and location	M_{w}	Depth (km)	MMI	Notes	Casualties	
Date	Country and location	M_{w}	Depth (km)	MMI	Notes	Dead	Injured
2	Indonesia, Maluku offshore, 327 km (203 mi) WSW of Tual	7.1	201.7	V	-	-	-
2	Pakistan, Balochistan, 30 km (19 mi) E of Ziarat	4.9	51.9	III	One person injured and some buildings damaged in Quetta.	-	1
5	Taiwan, Yilan offshore, 22 km (14 mi) SE of Yilan	5.7	3.5	VIII	Two people injured in Yilan County.	-	2
6	Solomon Islands, Makira-Ulawa offshore, 139 km (86 mi) SSE of Kirakira	6.1	10.0	V	-	-	-
6	North of Severnaya Zemlya	6.3	10.0	-	-	-	-
9	South Africa, North West, 7 km (4.3 mi) SSE of Stilfontein	5.0	5.0	VII	Two people killed, 58 injured and many buildings damaged in the Klerksdorp-Stilfontein area.	2	58
12	Turkey, Bingöl, 16 km (9.9 mi) E of Karlıova	5.6	11.1	VIII	Foreshock of the 5.8 event on March 14. Sixteen people injured and 214 buildings damaged in the Çat-Karliova area. A landslide blocked a road between Çat and Erzurum.	-	16
13	Iran, Sistan and Baluchestan, 119 km (74 mi) E of Iranshahr	6.0	54.0	V	Some buildings damaged in Saravan.	-	-
14	Turkey, Bingöl, 12 km (7.5 mi) NW of Karlıova	5.8	5.0	VIII	Eighteen people injured, some previously-weakened buildings collapsed, 450 others damaged and some livestock killed in Bingöl Province.	-	18
14	India, Maharashtra, 28 km (17 mi) ESE of Mākhjan	4.9	10.0	VIII	At least 45 people injured in Kolhapur, Ratnagiri and Satara, Maharashtra and in Belgaum, Karnataka. Buildings damaged in the Dhebewadi-Kasani area and Devgad, Koynanagar, Patan and Sangammeshwar. Minor damage to some buildings in Pune.	-	45
17	Guatemala, Totonicapán, 10 km (6.2 mi) NE of San Bartolo	6.1	197.4	IV	-	-	-
19	Tonga, Ha‘apai offshore, 65 km (40 mi) S of Pangai	6.1	18.0	VII	-	-	-
19	Fiji, Lau offshore, 442 km (275 mi) SSE of Levuka	6.3	598.7	-	-	-	-
20	Japan, Fukuoka offshore, 28 km (17 mi) NNW of Maebaru-chūō	6.6	10.0	X	Further information: 2005 Fukuoka earthquake	1	1,204
21	Argentina, Salta, 67 km (42 mi) ENE of Joaquín V. González	6.9	579.1	IV	-	-	-
21	Argentina, Salta, 59 km (37 mi) ESE of Apolinario Saravia	6.4	570.1	IV	Aftershock of the 6.9 event.	-	-
26	Indonesia, Maluku offshore, 205 km (127 mi) SSE of Amahai	6.1	10.0	VII	-	-	-
28	Indonesia, Aceh, 78 km (48 mi) WSW of Singkil	8.6	30.0	X	Further information: 2005 Nias–Simeulue earthquake	1,738	9,375
28	Indonesia, North Sumatra, 136 km (85 mi) SW of Sibolga	6.1	36.1	VIII	Aftershocks of the 2005 Nias–Simeulue earthquake.	-	-
30	Indonesia, Aceh offshore, 121 km (75 mi) WNW of Sinabang	6.3	22.0	VIII	Aftershocks of the 2005 Nias–Simeulue earthquake.	-	-
30	Fiji, Lau offshore, 442 km (275 mi) SSE of Houma	6.1	588.7	-	-	-	-
31	Fiji, Nadroga-Navosa offshore, 166 km (103 mi) WSW of Nadi	6.0	10.0	-	-	-	-

=== April ===
April
- Strongest: M_{w} 6.7 New Caledonia; M_{w} 6.7 Indonesia
- Deadliest: M_{w} 6.7 Indonesia; 6 deaths
- Total fatalities: 6

Number by magnitude
- 9.0+: 0
- 8.0–8.9: 0
- 7.0–7.9: 0
- 6.0–6.9: 15
- 5.0–5.9: 147
- 4.0–4.9: 1,641

Date	Country and location	M_{w}	Depth (km)	MMI	Notes	Casualties	
Date	Country and location	M_{w}	Depth (km)	MMI	Notes	Dead	Injured
2	Norway, Svalbard and Jan Mayen offshore, 218 km (135 mi) W of Longyearbyen	6.1	10.0	-	-	-	-
2	Indonesia, North Sumatra, 121 km (75 mi) SSW of Singkil	4.6	24.5	-	Aftershock of the 2005 Nias–Simeulue earthquake. Several hundred people injured on Nias.	-	300–500
3	Indonesia, North Sumatra offshore, 154 km (96 mi) SW of Padangsidimpuan	6.0	30.0	VII	Aftershocks of the 2005 Nias–Simeulue earthquake.	-	-
3	Indonesia, North Sumatra offshore, 33 km (21 mi) SSE of Singkil	6.3	36.0	VII	Aftershocks of the 2005 Nias–Simeulue earthquake.	-	-
7	China, Tibet Autonomous Region, 196 km (122 mi) NE of Jumla, Nepal	6.3	11.0	IX	Minor damage in Payang Town.	-	-
8	Indonesia, North Sumatra offshore, 245 km (152 mi) SSW of Sibolga	6.1	20.9	VI	Aftershock of the 2005 Nias–Simeulue earthquake.	-	-
10	New Caledonia, South offshore, 189 km (117 mi) ESE of Vao	6.1	10.0	-	-	-	-
10	Indonesia, West Sumatra offshore, 113 km (70 mi) SW of Padang	6.7	19.0	VII	Five people killed in Padang and another in Padang Pariaman Regency, and 100 buildings destroyed in Mentawai Islands Regency. A tsunami with a wave height of 40 cm (1.3 ft) was observed at Padang.	6	-
10	Indonesia, West Sumatra offshore, 106 km (66 mi) SW of Padang	6.5	30.0	VII	Aftershocks of the 6.7 event.	-	-
10	Indonesia, West Sumatra offshore, 100 km (62 mi) SW of Padang	6.4	30.0	VII	Aftershocks of the 6.7 event.	-	-
11	Indonesia, Aceh offshore, 54 km (34 mi) SE of Sinabang	6.1	24.0	VIII	Aftershock of the 2005 Nias–Simeulue earthquake.	-	-
11	Papua New Guinea, Madang offshore, 192 km (119 mi) N of Madang	6.6	11.4	V	-	-	-
11	Peru, Cajamarca, 18 km (11 mi) ENE of Shirac	6.0	129.9	IV	-	-	-
11	New Caledonia, Loyalty Islands offshore, 286 km (178 mi) E of Tadine	6.7	68.0	I	-	-	
16	Indonesia, North Sumatra offshore, 54 km (34 mi) SSW of Singkil	6.4	31.0	VII	Aftershock of the 2005 Nias–Simeulue earthquake.	-	-
19	Japan, Fukuoka offshore, 8 km (5.0 mi) NNW of Maebaru-chūō	5.5	18.7	VIII	Aftershock of the 2005 Fukuoka earthquake. Fifty-eight people injured, several homes collapsed on Genkai Island and 279 buildings damaged in Fukuoka Prefecture.	-	58
28	Indonesia, Aceh offshore, 60 km (37 mi) SE of Sinabang	6.2	22.0	VIII	Aftershock of the 2005 Nias–Simeulue earthquake.	-	-

=== May ===
May
- Strongest: M_{w} 6.9 Indonesia
- Deadliest: M_{w} 4.9 Iran; 4 deaths
- Total fatalities: 4

Number by magnitude
- 9.0+: 0
- 8.0–8.9: 0
- 7.0–7.9: 0
- 6.0–6.9: 11
- 5.0–5.9: 112
- 4.0–4.9: 1,273

Date	Country and location	M_{w}	Depth (km)	MMI	Notes	Casualties	
Date	Country and location	M_{w}	Depth (km)	MMI	Notes	Dead	Injured
1	Japan, Fukuoka, 6 km (3.7 mi) NE of Maebaru-chūō	4.6	10.0	VI	Aftershock of the 2005 Fukuoka earthquake. One person injured in Fukuoka.	-	1
3	Iran, Lorestan, 21 km (13 mi) SSW of Borujerd	4.6	11.8	VII	Foreshock of the 2006 Borujerd earthquake. Four people killed, 26 injured and extensive damage in the Borujerd area.	4	26
5	Panama, Chiriquí offshore, 256 km (159 mi) S of Punta de Burica	6.5	18.0	-	-	-	-
10	Indonesia, Lampung offshore, 245 km (152 mi) S of Pagar Alam	6.3	17.0	V	-	-	-
12	Western Indian-Antarctic Ridge	6.5	10.0	-	-	-	-
14	Indonesia, North Sumatra offshore, 125 km (78 mi) SW of Padangsidimpuan	6.7	34.0	VII	Aftershock of the 2005 Nias–Simeulue earthquake.	-	-
16	New Zealand, Kermadec Islands offshore	6.6	34.0	-	-	-	
18	South Georgia and the South Sandwich Islands offshore, South Sandwich Islands region	6.0	102.2	-	-	-	-
18	Tonga, Niua offshore, 92 km (57 mi) NE of Hihifo	6.2	10.0	V	-	-	-
18	Indonesia, Aceh offshore, 219 km (136 mi) W of Banda Aceh	6.1	2.5	IV	Aftershock of the 2004 Indian Ocean earthquake.	-	-
19	Indonesia, North Sumatra offshore, 89 km (55 mi) SSW of Singkil	6.9	30.0	VIII	Aftershock of the 2005 Nias–Simeulue earthquake.	-	-
20	South of the Fiji Islands	6.0	565.3	-	-	-	-
21	Peru, Tumbes offshore, 55 km (34 mi) NW of Zorritos	6.3	39.5	VII	Four homes collapsed in Tumbes.	-	-
23	South Africa, Gauteng, 4 km (2.5 mi) ENE of Carletonville	4.3	5.0	I	Nineteen miners injured in a mine collapse in Carletonville.	-	19

=== June ===
June
- Strongest: M_{w} 7.8 Chile
- Deadliest: M_{w} 7.8 Chile; 11 deaths
- Total fatalities: 12

Number by magnitude
- 9.0+: 0
- 8.0–8.9: 0
- 7.0–7.9: 2
- 6.0–6.9: 9
- 5.0–5.9: 107
- 4.0–4.9: 1,060

Date	Country and location	M_{w}	Depth (km)	MMI	Notes	Casualties	
Date	Country and location	M_{w}	Depth (km)	MMI	Notes	Dead	Injured
2	Argentina, Salta, 69 km (43 mi) W of San Antonio de los Cobres	6.1	196.2	III	-	-	-
4	Papua New Guinea, Morobe, 47 km (29 mi) NNW of Lae	6.1	26.0	VII	One person killed, several injured and many houses damaged or destroyed in Lae.	1	Several
6	Turkey, Bingöl, 10 km (6.2 mi) SE of Karlıova	5.6	10.0	VIII	Fifty-four people injured, five of them seriously, several buildings collapsed and 60 damaged in Karlıova.	-	54
8	Indonesia, Aceh offshore, 51 km (32 mi) SE of Sinabang	6.1	23.5	VIII	Aftershock of the 2005 Nias–Simeulue earthquake.	-	-
12	South Georgia and the South Sandwich Islands offshore, South Sandwich Islands region	6.0	94.1	-	-	-	-
13	Chile, Tarapacá, 102 km (63 mi) ENE of Iquique	7.8	115.6	X	Further information: 2005 Tarapacá earthquake	11	200
14	United States, Alaska offshore, 289 km (180 mi) WSW of Adak	6.8	17.0	V	-	-	-
15	United States, California offshore, 153 km (95 mi) W of Big Lagoon	7.2	16.0	V	A 26 cm (10 in) high tsunami was observed at Crescent City	-	-
15	Papua New Guinea, New Ireland offshore, 106 km (66 mi) ESE of Kokopo	6.2	74.6	V	-	-	-
16	United States, California, 4 km (2.5 mi) NE of Yucaipa	4.9	10.6	VII	Two people injured in San Bernardino and another in Lake Arrowhead.	-	3
15	Chile, Aysén offshore, 587 km (365 mi) WSW of Quellón	6.4	10.0	-	-	-	-
17	United States, California offshore, 196 km (122 mi) W of Ferndale	6.6	12.0	III	Aftershock of the 7.2 event on June 15.	-	-
20	Japan, Niigata, 17 km (11 mi) ENE of Jōetsu	4.9	15.9	VII	Aftershock of the 2004 Chūetsu earthquake. One person injured in Kashiwazaki.	-	1
27	Mexico, Jalisco offshore, 236 km (147 mi) SW of La Cruz de Loreto	6.2	20.0	-	-	-	-

=== July ===
July
- Strongest: M_{w} 7.2 India
- Deadliest: M_{w} 2.7 South Africa; 1 death M_{w} 5.0 China; 1 death
- Total fatalities: 2

Number by magnitude
- 9.0+: 0
- 8.0–8.9: 0
- 7.0–7.9: 1
- 6.0–6.9: 7
- 5.0–5.9: 126
- 4.0–4.9: 1,013

Date	Country and location	M_{w}	Depth (km)	MMI	Notes	Casualties	
Date	Country and location	M_{w}	Depth (km)	MMI	Notes	Dead	Injured
2	Nicaragua, Rivas offshore, 32 km (20 mi) W of San Juan del Sur	6.6	27.0	VIII	-	-	-
4	South Africa, Prince Edward Islands offshore	6.3	10.0	-	-	-	-
5	Indonesia, Aceh offshore, 89 km (55 mi) SSW of Singkil	6.7	21.0	VII	Aftershock of the 2005 Nias–Simeulue earthquake. Buildings and roads damaged in Gunungsitoli.	-	-
5	South Africa, Gauteng, 6 km (3.7 mi) WNW of Fochville	2.7	5.0	I	One miner killed and another injured due to a mine collapse in Carletonville.	1	1
9	Indonesia, Central Sulawesi, 31 km (19 mi) SSE of Palu	5.9	32.2	IX	Six buildings destroyed, 50 damaged and power outages occurred in Donggala Regency.	-	-
10	West Chile Rise	6.1	10.0	-	-	-	-
11	New Zealand, Kermadec Islands offshore	6.0	10.0	-	-	-	-
23	Japan, Chiba offshore, 9 km (5.6 mi) WSW of Ichihara	5.9	61.0	VII	Twenty-seven people injured and one building damaged in Tokyo.	-	27
23	New Zealand, Kermadec Islands offshore	6.0	10.0	-	-	-	-
24	India, Andaman and Nicobar Islands offshore, 412 km (256 mi) WNW of Sabang, Indonesia	7.2	16.0	VI	Aftershock of the 2004 Indian Ocean earthquake. Some buildings damaged in the Andaman and Nicobar Islands.	-	-
25	China, Heilongjiang, 25 km (16 mi) ENE of Fendou	5.0	47.7	VII	One person killed and 12 injured in Daqing.	1	12
30	Antarctica offshore, Balleny Islands region	6.0	10.0	-	-	-	-

=== August ===
August
- Strongest: M_{w} 7.2 Japan
- Total fatalities: 0

Number by magnitude
- 9.0+: 0
- 8.0–8.9: 0
- 7.0–7.9: 1
- 6.0–6.9: 12
- 5.0–5.9: 101
- 4.0–4.9: 934

Date	Country and location	M_{w}	Depth (km)	MMI	Notes	Casualties	
Date	Country and location	M_{w}	Depth (km)	MMI	Notes	Dead	Injured
3	Nicaragua, Rivas, 6 km (3.7 mi) NNW of Cárdenas	6.3	14.0	IX	-	-	-
5	China, Yunnan, 106 km (66 mi) SW of Zhaotong	5.2	42.4	IV	Nine people injured and 3,700 buildings damaged in Huize County.	-	9
6	Tonga, Ha‘apai offshore, 158 km (98 mi) W of Pangai	6.0	205.4	-	-	-	-
7	South Africa, Prince Edward Islands offshore	6.2	10.0	-	-	-	-
7	Wallis and Futuna, Alofi offshore, 89 km (55 mi) E of Alo	6.0	10.0	-	-	-	-
9	Vanuatu region offshore	6.1	23.6	-	Doublet earthquake.	-	-
9	Vanuatu region offshore	6.1	35.0	-	Doublet earthquake.	-	-
9	New Caledonia, South offshore, 206 km (128 mi) E of Vao	6.2	10.0	-	-	-	-
13	China, Yunnan, 32 km (20 mi) NNW of Wenshan City	4.8	10.0	VI	Twenty-six people injured, several homes destroyed, roads and reservoirs damaged in Wenshan City.	-	26
13	Northern Mariana Islands, Northern Islands offshore, 547 km (340 mi) N of Saipan	6.0	48.6	-	-	-	-
16	Japan, Miyagi offshore, 66 km (41 mi) ESE of Ishinomaki	7.2	36.0	VII	Further information: 2005 Miyagi earthquake	-	100
21	Japan, Niigata, 10 km (6.2 mi) SSE of Kashiwazaki	4.8	13.3	VII	Aftershock of the 2004 Chūetsu earthquake. Two people injured in Kashiwazaki.	-	2
24	Japan, Miyagi offshore, 123 km (76 mi) ESE of Ōfunato	6.1	10.0	I	Aftershock of the 2005 Miyagi earthquake.	-	-
26	Yemen, Al Mahrah offshore, 199 km (124 mi) S of Al Ghayz̧ah	6.2	10.0	-	-	-	-
27	Panama, Veraguas offshore, 142 km (88 mi) SSE of Punta de Burica	6.1	10.0	-	-	-	-
30	Japan, Miyagi offshore, 142 km (88 mi) ESE of Ōfunato	6.1	21.1	III	Aftershock of the 2005 Miyagi earthquake.	-	-

=== September ===
September
- Strongest: M_{w} 7.6 Papua New Guinea
- Deadliest: M_{w} 7.5 Peru; 20 deaths
- Total fatalities: 20

Number by magnitude
- 9.0+: 0
- 8.0–8.9: 0
- 7.0–7.9: 2
- 6.0–6.9: 6
- 5.0–5.9: 127
- 4.0–4.9: 1,062

Date	Country and location	M_{w}	Depth (km)	MMI	Notes	Casualties	
Date	Country and location	M_{w}	Depth (km)	MMI	Notes	Dead	Injured
4	Indonesia, North Sulawesi offshore, 259 km (161 mi) NW of Manado	6.0	443.9	III	-	-	-
5	Pacific–Antarctic Ridge	6.2	10.0	-	-	-	-
9	Papua New Guinea, New Ireland offshore, 135 km (84 mi) E of Kokopo	7.6	90.0	VIII	-	-	-
21	Russia, Sakhalin offshore, 27 km (17 mi) ESE of Yuzhno-Kurilsk	6.1	103.0	V	-	-	-
25	Vanuatu, Shefa offshore, 59 km (37 mi) WNW of Port Vila	6.1	30.0	VII	-	-	-
26	Peru, Loreto, 39 km (24 mi) NW of Yurimaguas	7.5	115.0	VII	Further information: 2005 Northern Peru earthquake	20	266
29	Papua New Guinea, East New Britain, 129 km (80 mi) SSW of Kokopo	6.6	25.0	VIII	-	-	-
29	Papua New Guinea, East New Britain offshore, 142 km (88 mi) SSW of Kokopo	6.2	28.0	VIII	Aftershock of the 6.6 event.	-	-

=== October ===
October
- Strongest: M_{w} 7.6 Pakistan
- Deadliest: M_{w} 7.6 Pakistan; 88,714 deaths
- Total fatalities: 88,718

Number by magnitude
- 9.0+: 0
- 8.0–8.9: 0
- 7.0–7.9: 1
- 6.0–6.9: 5
- 5.0–5.9: 151
- 4.0–4.9: 1,079

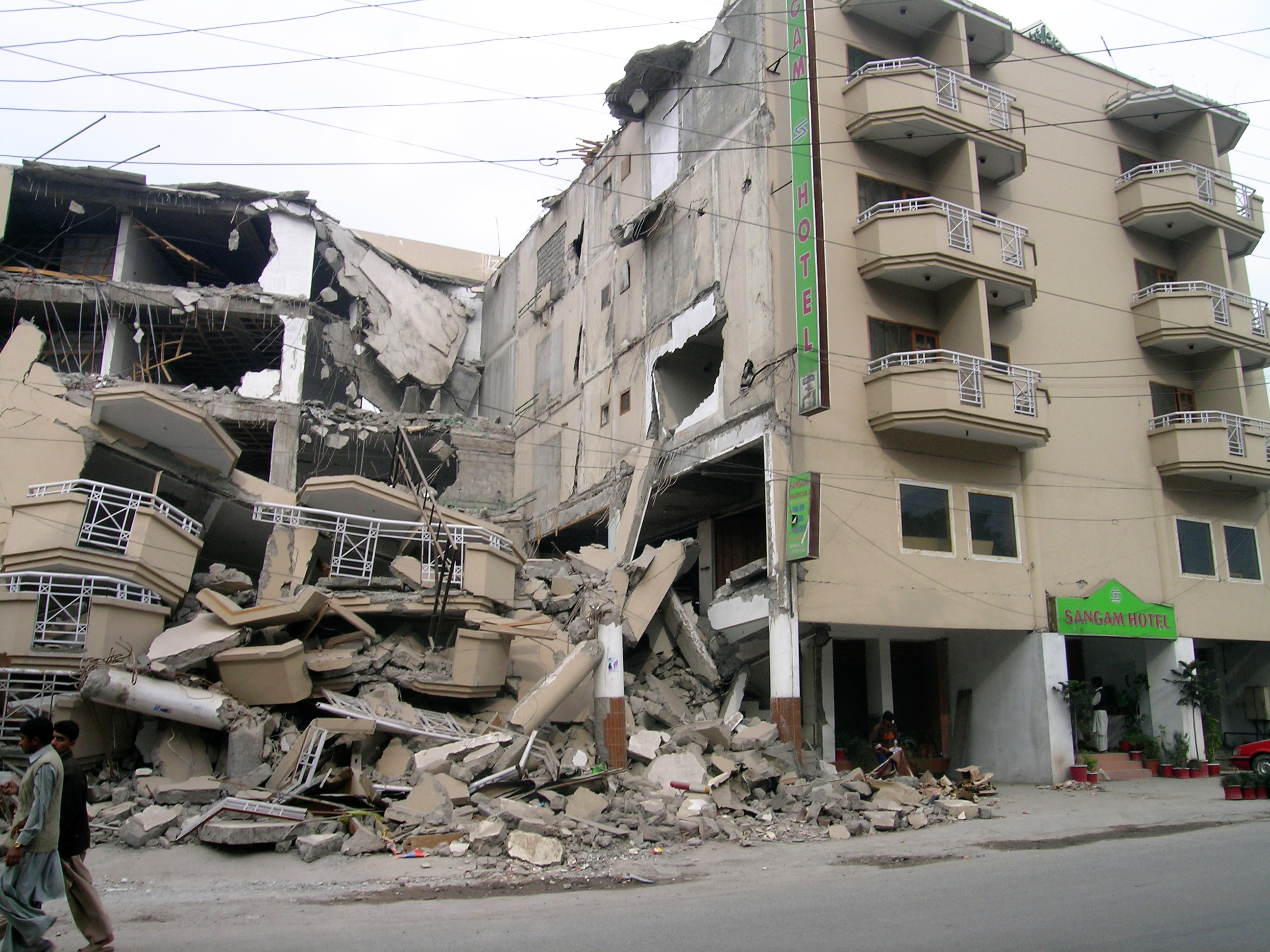
A collapsed hotel in Muzaffarabad, Pakistan

Date	Country and location	M_{w}	Depth (km)	MMI	Notes	Casualties	
Date	Country and location	M_{w}	Depth (km)	MMI	Notes	Dead	Injured
1	Peru, Moquegua, 15 km (9.3 mi) NE of Quinistaquillas	5.3	20.0	VII	Ten people injured and 300 homes destroyed in Moquegua.	-	10
8	Pakistan, Azad Kashmir, 21 km (13 mi) NNE of Muzaffarabad	7.6	26.0	XI	Further information: 2005 Kashmir earthquake	88,718	207,096
8	Pakistan, Khyber Pakhtunkhwa, 9 km (5.6 mi) NE of Battagram	6.4	8.0	IX	Aftershock of the 2005 Kashmir earthquake.	-	-
15	Pakistan, Khyber Pakhtunkhwa, 8 km (5.0 mi) SSW of Uri, India	5.2	10.0	VII	Aftershock of the 2005 Kashmir earthquake. Two people killed in Uri.	2	-
15	Russia, Sakhalin offshore, 453 km (281 mi) SSW of Severo-Kurilsk	6.1	42.8	I	-	-	-
15	Japan, Okinawa offshore, 99 km (62 mi) NNE of Yonakuni	6.4	192.0	IV	-	-	-
16	Japan, Saitama, 4 km (2.5 mi) NNE of Kasukabe	5.0	40.3	V	Two people injured in Tokyo.	-	2
19	Japan, Ibaraki offshore, 25 km (16 mi) ENE of Ōarai	6.3	32.0	VI	-	-	-
20	Turkey, İzmir, 9 km (5.6 mi) WSW of Seferihisar	5.9	10.0	VIII	One person died of a heart attack and 15 others injured in İzmir. Several buildings damaged in Urla.	1	15
23	Pakistan, Khyber Pakhtunkhwa, 19 km (12 mi) N of Battagram	5.5	10.0	VIII	Aftershock of the 2005 Kashmir earthquake. Walls collapsed in Besham.	-	-
27	China, Guangxi, 102 km (63 mi) NNW of Nanning	4.2	10.0	V	One person killed and another injured in Baise. Several homes damaged in Taiping.	1	1
29	Southeast Indian Ridge	6.5	8.0	-	-	-	-

=== November ===
November
- Strongest: M_{w} 7.0 Japan
- Deadliest: M_{w} 5.2 China; 21 deaths
- Total fatalities: 35

Number by magnitude
- 9.0+: 0
- 8.0–8.9: 0
- 7.0–7.9: 1
- 6.0–6.9: 8
- 5.0–5.9: 100
- 4.0–4.9: 884

Date	Country and location	M_{w}	Depth (km)	MMI	Notes	Casualties	
Date	Country and location	M_{w}	Depth (km)	MMI	Notes	Dead	Injured
5	Papua New Guinea, Manus offshore, 156 km (97 mi) SE of Lorengau	6.4	25.0	V	-	-	-
6	Pakistan, Khyber Pakhtunkhwa, 17 km (11 mi) ENE of Baffa	5.1	10.0	VII	Aftershock of the 2005 Kashmir earthquake. Seven people injured in Battagram.	-	7
8	Vietnam, Bình Thuận offshore, 94 km (58 mi) SE of La Gi	5.3	10.0	IV	One person killed in Ho Chi Minh City.	1	-
17	Bolivia, Potosí, 68 km (42 mi) NNE of San Pedro de Atacama, Chile	6.8	147.0	VI	Power outages occurred in Tocopilla, Chile.	-	-
14	Japan, Miyagi offshore, 293 km (182 mi) ESE of Kamaishi	7.0	11.0	IV	A 32 cm (13 in) high tsunami was observed at Ōfunato.	-	-
19	Indonesia, Aceh offshore, 57 km (35 mi) SE of Sinabang	6.5	21.0	VIII	Aftershock of the 2005 Nias–Simeulue earthquake.	-	-
20	United States, Alaska offshore, 115 km (71 mi) ESE of Akutan	6.2	30.0	V	-	-	-
21	Japan, Kagoshima offshore, 41 km (25 mi) SW of Makurazaki	6.1	145.0	IV	-	-	-
22	Papua New Guinea, Madang, 56 km (35 mi) W of Madang	6.2	68.0	V	-	-	-
26	China, Jiangxi, 23 km (14 mi) SSE of Wuxue	5.2	11.1	VII	Further information: 2005 Ruichang earthquake	21	8,000
27	Iran, Hormozgan, 45 km (28 mi) WSW of Qeshm	5.9	10.0	VII	Further information: 2005 Qeshm earthquake	13	100
28	Northern Mariana Islands, Northern Islands offshore, 565 km (351 mi) N of Saipan	6.0	11.0	-	-	-	-
30	Philippines, Soccsksargen offshore, 18 km (11 mi) WNW of Palimbang	6.4	13.0	VI	-	-	-

=== December ===
December
- Strongest: M_{w} 6.8 Tanzania
- Deadliest: M_{w} 6.8 Tanzania; 8 deaths
- Total fatalities: 14

Number by magnitude
- 9.0+: 0
- 8.0–8.9: 0
- 7.0–7.9: 0
- 6.0–6.9: 14
- 5.0–5.9: 106
- 4.0–4.9: 945

Date	Country and location	M_{w}	Depth (km)	MMI	Notes	Casualties	
Date	Country and location	M_{w}	Depth (km)	MMI	Notes	Dead	Injured
2	Japan, Miyagi offshore, 80 km (50 mi) ESE of Ishinomaki	6.5	29.0	V	Aftershock of the 2005 Miyagi earthquake.	-	-
5	Tanzania, Kigoma, 76 km (47 mi) ESE of Kalemie, Democratic Republic of the Congo	6.8	22.0	X	Further information: 2005 Lake Tanganyika earthquake	8	5
7	New Zealand, Kermadec Islands offshore	6.4	21.0	-	-	-	
8	Papua New Guinea, Madang offshore, 130 km (81 mi) E of Madang	6.1	216.8	IV	-	-	-
11	Papua New Guinea, East New Britain offshore, 247 km (153 mi) S of Kokopo	6.6	17.0	V	-	-	-
12	Afghanistan, Badakhshan, 53 km (33 mi) SW of Ashkāsham	6.5	224.6	V	Further information: 2005 Hindu Kush earthquake	5	1
13	Wallis and Futuna, Alofi offshore, 116 km (72 mi) SSW of Leava	6.7	10.0	V	-	-	-
14	India, Uttarakhand, 9 km (5.6 mi) NNW of Pīpalkoti	5.1	44.0	VI	One person killed in Jausari. Three people injured in Chamoli and one in Nandaprayag. One building collapsed in Phata and many more damaged in Uttarakhand, Himachal Pradesh and Jammu and Kashmir.	1	4
16	Japan, Miyagi offshore, 53 km (33 mi) E of Ishinomaki	6.0	42.9	IV	Aftershock of the 2005 Miyagi earthquake.	-	-
20	Federated States of Micronesia, Yap offshore, 277 km (172 mi) N of Fais	6.1	22.8	-	-	-	-
21	Indonesia, North Sulawesi offshore, 153 km (95 mi) S of Tomohon	6.3	25.0	V	-	-	-
21	Panama, Chiriquí offshore, 154 km (96 mi) S of Punta de Burica	6.0	7.0	-	-	-	-
22	Pacific–Antarctic Ridge	6.3	10.0	-	-	-	-
23	Ecuador, Pastaza, 54 km (34 mi) SE of Tena	6.1	192.9	IV	-	-	-
24	Japan, Aichi, 5 km (3.1 mi) ESE of Inazawa	4.7	43.0	V	One person injured in Yokkaichi.	-	1
30	Panama, Chiriquí offshore, 76 km (47 mi) S of Boca Chica	6.1	7.0	V	-	-	-

== See also ==
- Lists of 21st-century earthquakes
- List of earthquakes 2001–2010
- Lists of earthquakes by year
- Lists of earthquakes
