= 2005 Fukuoka earthquake =

Earthquake off the coast of Japan

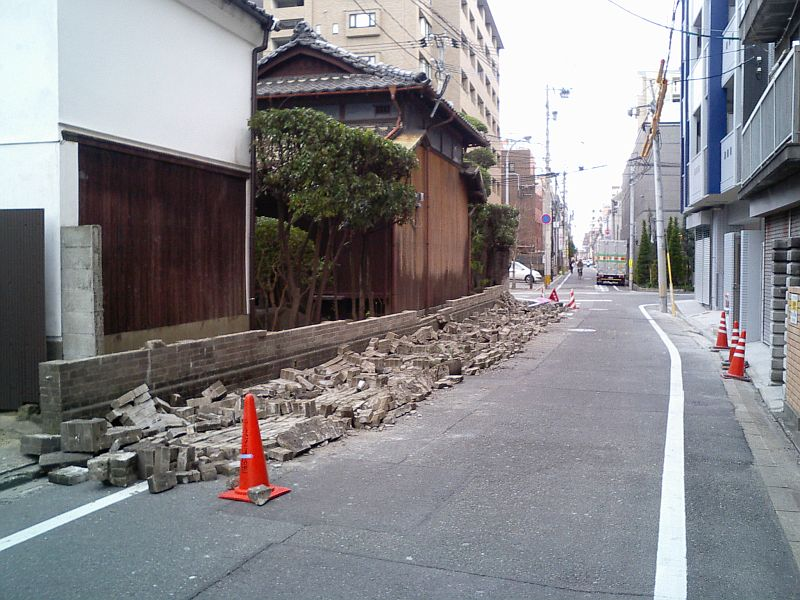
- A collapsed brick wall in Chūō-ku, Fukuoka

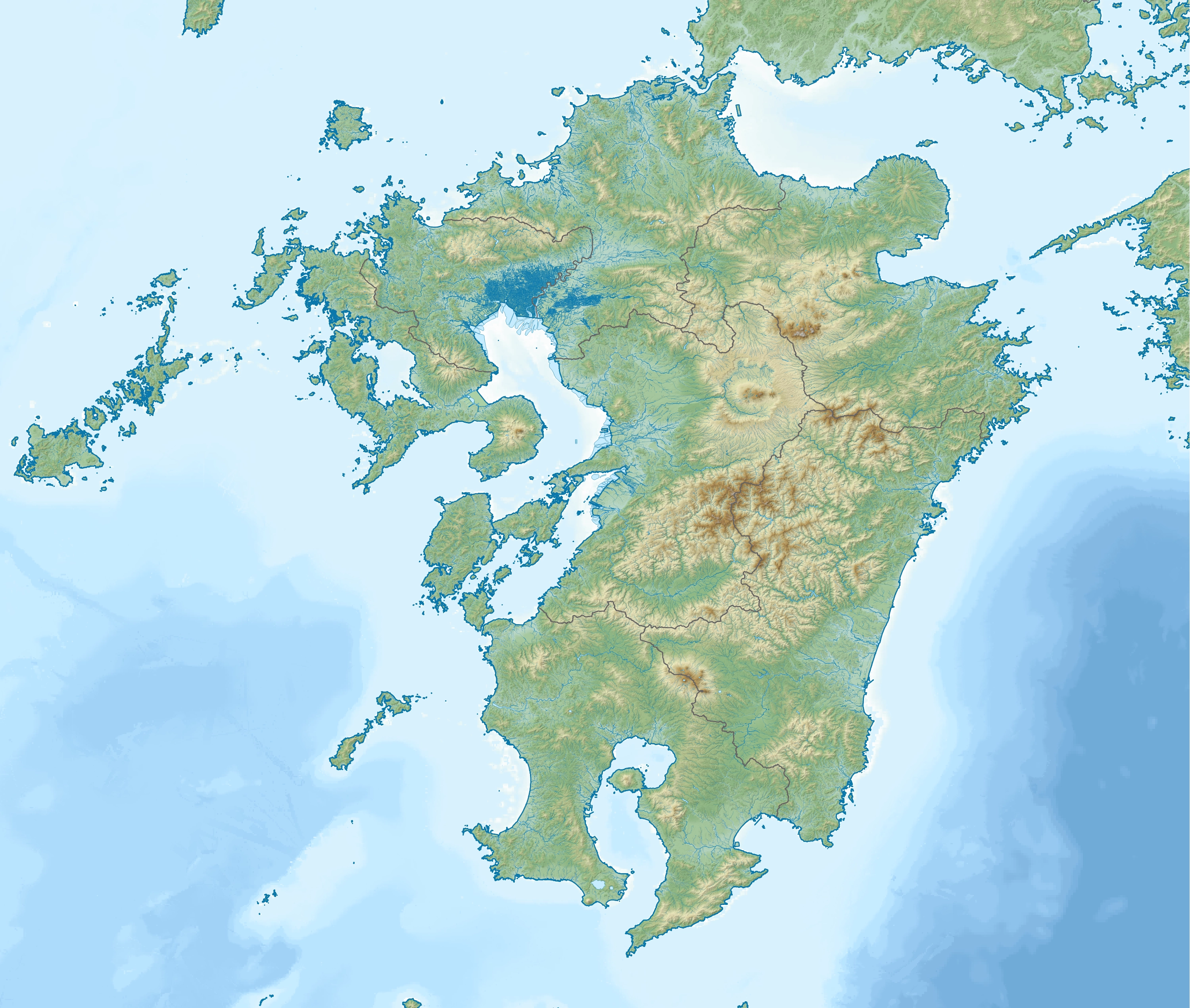
- Location within Kyushu Location within Japan
- UTC time: 2005-03-20 01:53:41
- ISC event: 7483150
- USGS-ANSS: ComCat
- Local date: March 20, 2005
- Local time: 10:53:41 JST (UTC+9)
- Magnitude: M_{JMA} 7.0 M_{w} 6.6
- Depth: 10 km (6 mi) (USGS)
- Epicenter: 33.807°N 130.131°E
- Fault: Kego fault
- Type: Strike-slip
- Areas affected: Fukuoka, Saga, Nagasaki, Ōita and Yamaguchi Prefectures, Japan
- Total damage: ¥31.5 billion (US$218.72 million, equivalent to $361 million in 2025)
- Max. intensity: JMA 6−–7 (MMI X)
- Landslides: 24
- Aftershocks: 405 (as of December 2005); M_{JMA} 5.8 on 20 April 2005 (strongest)
- Casualties: 1 death, 1,204 injuries

On 20 March 2005, at 10:53:41 JST (01:53:41 UTC), a M_{JMA} 7.0 earthquake struck in the Genkai Sea off the coast of Fukuoka Prefecture, Kyushu, Japan. It was the largest earthquake ever recorded in the prefecture. It damaged or destroyed 20,300 houses and many buildings, killed an elderly woman and injured over 1,200 people, with the vast majority of damage and casualties occurring in Fukuoka Prefecture, especially Genkai Island, where nearly 80% of homes were heavily damaged or destroyed, and Fukuoka City. Damage and injuries also occurred in Saga, Nagasaki, Ōita and Yamaguchi Prefectures.

== Tectonic setting ==
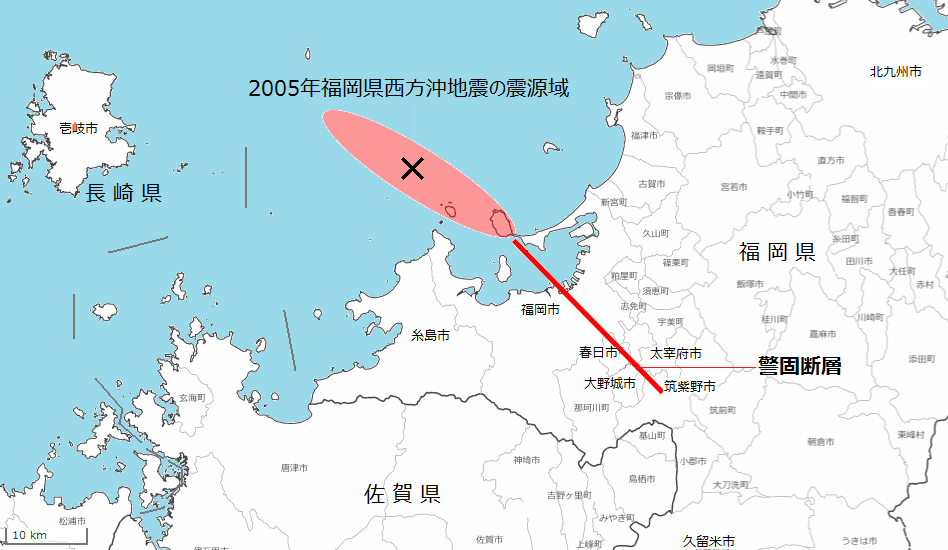
Kego fault zone

Fukuoka Prefecture, located in northwestern Kyushu, is quite far from the tectonic boundaries that produce large earthquakes in Japan compared to other areas of the island. However, northwest of Fukuoka's coastline lies the Kego fault zone, which includes a 55 km (34 mi) left-lateral strike-slip fault line which propagates from the Genkai Sea in the northwest, through Hakata Bay to the Fukuoka Plain in the southeast, directly beneath Fukuoka City and Genkai Island.

This fault is estimated to be capable of producing earthquakes of up to M_{JMA} 7.2, with at least 1,100 fatalities and Shindo 7 shaking expected in Fukuoka City if it ruptures in its entirety, and it is believed that there is an up to 6% chance that the fault ruptures by 2056, making it one of the most dangerous fault lines for earthquake activity in western Japan.

== Earthquake ==
Estimated number of people exposed to shaking levels
MMI	Population exposure
MMI X (Extreme)	338
MMI IX (Violent)	363k
MMI VIII (Severe)	1,094k
MMI VII (Very strong)	865k
MMI VI (Strong)	2,764k

The United States Geological Survey (USGS) recorded a moment magnitude of 6.6, while the Japan Meteorological Agency put the magnitude at 7.0. The epicenter was located 10 km (6.2 mi) southeast of Orono Island in the Genkai Sea. It was the largest earthquake in recorded history near Fukuoka City, and the first major earthquake to hit the prefecture in about 300 years.

The focal mechanism of the mainshock corresponds to strike-slip faulting with a compression axis in a horizonal direction. This unnamed fault is a left-lateral strike-slip fault with a nearly vertical fault surface in a NW-SE direction. Subsequent investigations determined that the new fault was most likely an extension of the known Kego fault that runs through the centre of Fukuoka city. The area of the rupture was 26 km (16 mi) x 18 km (11 mi), with up to 3 m (9.8 ft) of slip recorded southeast of the epicenter. The rupture reached land, more specifically Genkai Island.

According to GPS data and reports from the Geospatial Information Authority of Japan, ground displacement was observed in areas of Fukuoka; Genkai Island moved 38 cm (1.25 ft) to the south, Higashi-ku, Fukuoka moved 17 cm (6.7 in) to the southwest, while Maebaru moved 8 cm (3.1 in) to the south. These instances of displacement are consistent with the focal mechanism of the mainshock. Sand boils and soil liquefaction were widely observed in areas of reclaimed land along Fukuoka City's coastline. The earthquake also triggered at least 24 landslides in Fukuoka Prefecture.

By the end of December 2005, there were 405 aftershocks with a seismic intensity of Shindo 1 or higher (including 8 aftershocks with an intensity of Shindo 4 or higher). The largest aftershock was a M_{JMA} 5.8 earthquake that occurred on 20 April, with a seismic intensity of Shindo 5+ observed in Fukuoka City and other areas.

=== Intensity ===
The JMA stated that a maximum intensity of 6- on the JMA seismic intensity scale was recorded in Fukuoka and Saga prefectures. This intensity was recorded by seismic stations in Fukuoka City and Itoshima in Fukuoka and Miyaki in Saga. On Genkai Island, which did not have a JMA seismic station at the time of the earthquake, the JMA said the seismic intensity may have reached Shindo 7, primarily based on the severe damage to structures on the island. The earthquake prompted the JMA to install a seismic station on the island on 21 March 2005, the day after the earthquake.

The USGS reported a maximum Modified Mercalli intensity (MMI) of IX-X (Violent–Extreme) on Genkai Island and VIII–IX (Severe–Violent) in Fukuoka City. The earthquake was felt as far as Tokyo and Toyama with intensities of at least Shindo 1. In South Korea, MMI IV (Light) shaking was recorded in Busan, Gyeongju and Geoje, with tremors also felt in Seoul.

Locations with a seismic intensity of Shindo 5- and higher
Intensity	Prefecture	Locations
6−	Fukuoka	Itoshima, Fukuoka
6−	Saga	Miyaki
5+	Fukuoka	Hisayama, Shingū, Iizuka, Kama, Kasuya, Sue, Kasuga, Ōkawa
5+	Saga	Karatsu, Shiroishi
5+	Nagasaki	Iki
5−	Fukuoka	Kitakyushu, Munakata, Fukutsu, Onga, Nakama, Miyawaka, Nōgata, Ōnojō, Shime, Nakagawa
5−	Saga	Taku, Takeo, Ureshino, Kōhoku, Ogi, Saga, Kanzaki, Yoshinogari, Tosu
5−	Ōita	Nakatsu

== Impact ==
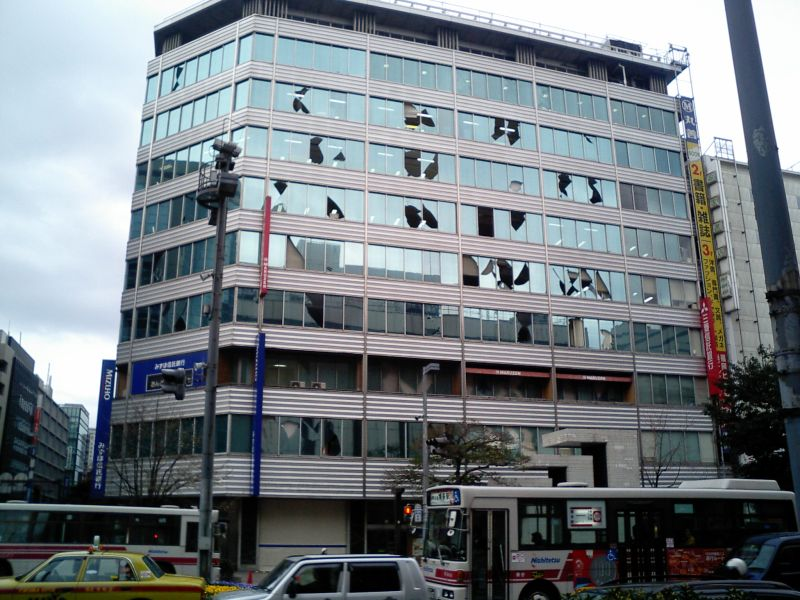
Broken windows at a building in Fukuoka City

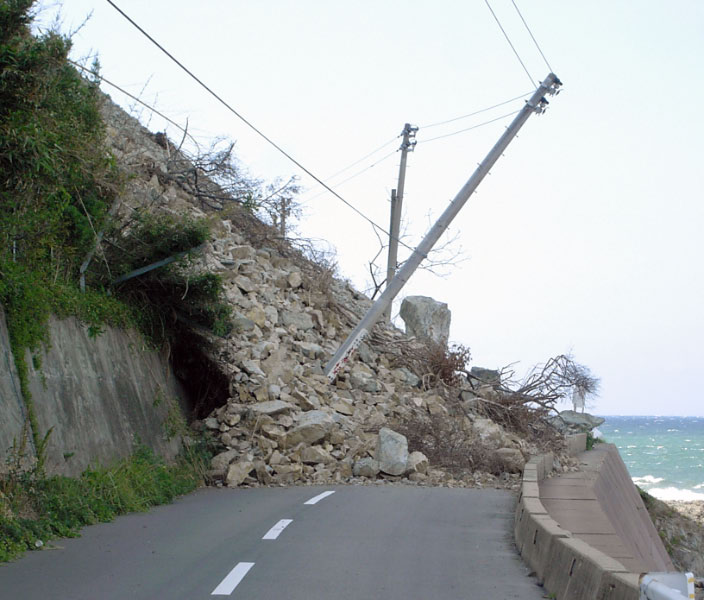
A road blocked by a rockslide on Shika Island

One person was killed, 1,204 others were injured, 144 homes were completely destroyed, 1,031 were partially destroyed and 19,137 more were damaged across five prefectures, with the vast majority of damage and injuries occurring in Fukuoka. At least 198 of the injuries were serious; 197 in Fukuoka and 1 in Saga.

The fatality was a 75 year-old woman who was crushed to death by a collapsing concrete wall in Fukuoka City. Across Fukuoka Prefecture, 1,186 people were injured, 143 homes were destroyed, 1,030 partially collapsed and 18,983 received minor-to-moderate damage. In addition, 381 roads were damaged. A survey of 109 injuries in Fukuoka City revealed that 31 were hurt after falling in panic, 19 suffered burns, 19 were injured by falling objects and 12 were injured by structural collapses; 60% of the injured were elderly people. Building damage in the city was especially severe in the areas of Akasaka and Daimyo in Chūō-ku, primarily due to the ground beneath them comprising soft sediments. In the ward, 30 homes were severely damaged or destroyed, and several buildings, including two apartment buildings and a 10-story commercial building, were damaged. Across Fukuoka City, a total of 1,038 people were injured, 1,007 homes partially or completely collapsed and 13,390 others were damaged. In Maebaru, 53 people were injured, 26 houses were heavily damaged and 2,291 more were partially damaged, while nearby Shima recorded 6 injuries, 16 partially collapsed and 920 damaged homes.

Islands closer to the epicenter received the worst damage from the earthquake. On Genkai Island, 10 people were injured and 182 of the 231 homes were severely damaged or destroyed. Residents of the island had to be evacuated for over a month after the earthquake. The island's port was also severely damaged by soil liquefaction and fissures. With the island's topography which necessitates construction on steep southern slopes, residential land had been built using retaining walls. Over 200 houses had been built on these walls, and most of them ended up receiving damage, with many partially destroyed due to the collapse of the retaining walls supporting them. Damage also occurred on Nokonoshima, Nishiura and Shika Island, as well as Shima and Itoshima on mainland Fukuoka.

The total damage to public facilities and agricultural products under Fukuoka Prefecture's jurisdiction amounted to JP¥31,497,028,000 (US$197.62 million). Of this, public civil engineering facilities accounted for approximately ¥19.5 billion, or 60%, public educational facilities for approximately ¥1.5 billion, and agricultural, forestry, and fisheries facilities for approximately ¥310 million. Broken down by industry, commerce and industry accounted for approximately ¥5.6 billion, fisheries for approximately ¥1.8 billion, forestry for approximately ¥440 million, and agriculture for approximately ¥100 million. Furthermore, according to a survey by the Fukuoka Chamber of Commerce and Industry, which includes companies in and around Fukuoka City, economic losses linked to 1,507 businesses amounted to ¥3.36 billion (US$21.1 million).

In Saga Prefecture, 15 people were injured, one of them seriously, one house partially collapsed and 136 others were damaged. Among the injured was a 26-year-old woman in Imari, who was wounded after a television screen fell and shattered. Two people were injured, one house completely collapsed and 15 others were damaged in Nagasaki Prefecture, while one injury and damage to one house occurred in Yamaguchi Prefecture. Two homes were also damaged in Ōita Prefecture.

== See also ==
- List of earthquakes in 2005
- List of earthquakes in Japan
- 2016 Kumamoto earthquakes
