= 2005 Miyagi earthquake =

Earthquake in Japan

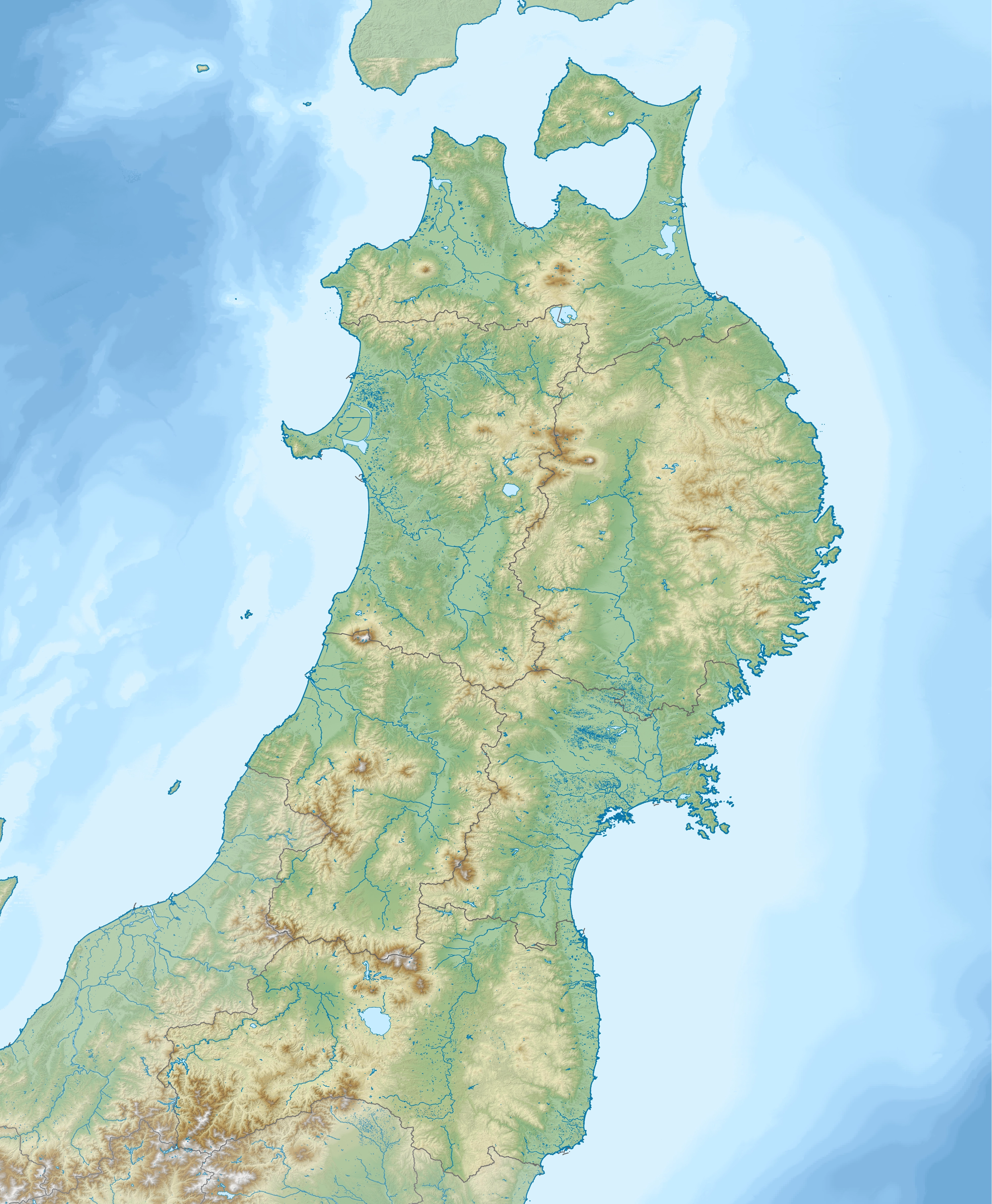
- Location within Tohoku, Japan Location within Japan
- UTC time: 2005-08-16 02:46:28
- ISC event: 7396432
- USGS-ANSS: ComCat
- Local date: August 16, 2005
- Local time: 11:46:28 JST (UTC+9)
- Duration: 20 seconds
- Magnitude: M_{JMA} 7.2 M_{w} 7.2
- Depth: 36 km (22 mi)
- Epicenter: 38°16′34″N 142°02′20″E
- Fault: Japan Trench
- Areas affected: Tōhoku Region and Saitama Prefecture, Japan
- Total damage: 985 homes damaged or destroyed
- Max. intensity: JMA 6− (MMI VII)
- Peak acceleration: 0.52 g
- Peak velocity: 31 cm (12 in)/s
- Tsunami: 10 cm (3.9 in)
- Landslides: Yes
- Aftershocks: 19 (as of 31 December 2005); M_{w} 6.5 on 2 December 2005 (Strongest)
- Casualties: 100 injured

On 16 August 2005, at 11:46:28 JST, a M_{JMA} 7.2 earthquake struck off the coast of the Oshika Peninsula in Miyagi Prefecture, Japan. It injured 100 people and damaged nearly 1,000 homes primarily in the Tōhoku Region.

== Tectonic setting ==
The Pacific plate, made of oceanic lithosphere, subducts beneath the Okhotsk Sea plate along a convergent boundary located off the east coast of the northern half of Japan. It runs from the Boso triple junction and ends near Hokkaido, where it joins the Kuril–Kamchatka Trench. At this location, the Pacific plate moves approximately westward relative to the North American plate at a velocity of 70 mm (2.8 in)/yr, subducting beneath Japan at the Japan Trench. This subduction zone is capable of producing megathrust earthquakes with magnitudes greater than 8.5, evident in the historical records. It was on the subduction interface where the 2011 Tōhoku earthquake nucleated. That event involved a rupture 220 km (140 mi) by 400 km (250 mi) on the subduction zone.

== Earthquake ==
Both the United States Geological Survey (USGS) and Japan Meteorological Agency (JMA) recorded a magnitude of M_{w} 7.2 and M_{JMA} 7.2, respectively. Its offshore epicenter was located 39 km (24 mi) east of the island of Kinkasan in Miyagi Prefecture. The focal mechanism corresponded to thrust faulting on the Japan Trench. A rupture area of 135 km (84 mi) x 60 km (37 mi) was estimated, with a maximum slip of 2.2621 m (7.422 ft) west of the epicenter. The observed source time function gives a 20 second duration for the earthquake, with the greatest phase of seismic moment release occurring about five seconds after initiation.

On the Modified Mercalli intensity scale (MMI), a maximum intensity of VII (Very strong) was recorded at Ishinomaki and areas along the Oshika Peninsula, while in Sendai, the MMI reached VI (Strong). A maximum peak ground acceleration of 0.52 g was recorded at Kurihara, Miyagi, while a station at Yamamoto recorded a peak velocity of 31 cm (12 in)/s.

By the end of 2005, 19 aftershocks of M_{w} 4.0 or higher were recorded by the USGS; the largest aftershock measured M_{w} 6.5, striking on 2 December with an epicenter southeast of the mainshock.

A tsunami advisory was issued by the JMA, but was lifted shortly after. A 10 cm (3.9 in) high tsunami struck the Tōhoku Region's coastline.

Locations with a seismic intensity of Shindo 5- and higher
Intensity	Prefecture	Locations
6-	Miyagi	Kawasaki
5+	Miyagi	Sendai, Natori, Higashimatsushima, Ishinomaki, Wakuya, Misato, Ōsaki, Kurihara, Tome
5+	Fukushima	Kunimi, Sōma, Shinchi, Minamisōma
5+	Iwate	Ichinoseki
5-	Miyagi	Yamamoto, Kakuda, Watari, Iwanuma, Shibata, Ōsato, Murata, Shiogama, Ōhira, Kami, Minamisanriku, Onagawa
5-	Fukushima	Fukushima City, Nakajima, Tamura, Nihonmatsu, Iitate, Date, Koori
5-	Iwate	Rikuzentakata, Hiraizumi, Ōshū, Kanegasaki, Kitakami, Hanamaki, Yahaba, Ninohe
5-	Ibaraki	Hitachi

== Impact ==
At least 100 people were injured, 12 of them seriously, including 79 in Miyagi, 11 in Iwate, 5 in Fukushima, 4 in Saitama and 1 in Yamagata. One house partially collapsed in Saitama, while 984 other households suffered partial damage across Honshu, including 590 in Fukushima, 383 in Miyagi, 9 in Iwate and 2 in Akita.

Some people were injured after the roof of an auditorium collapsed in Sendai. One landslide was also reported at an unspecified location. Bullet trains were suspended, three nuclear power stations were shut down automatically for safety checks, and flights at Haneda Airport in Tokyo were temporarily halted as a precaution. Some 17,000 households were reported to have lost power.

== See also ==
- List of earthquakes in 2005
- List of earthquakes in Japan
- March 2021 Miyagi earthquake
