= Ruichang =

Ruichang 瑞昌市 Juichang
- County-level city
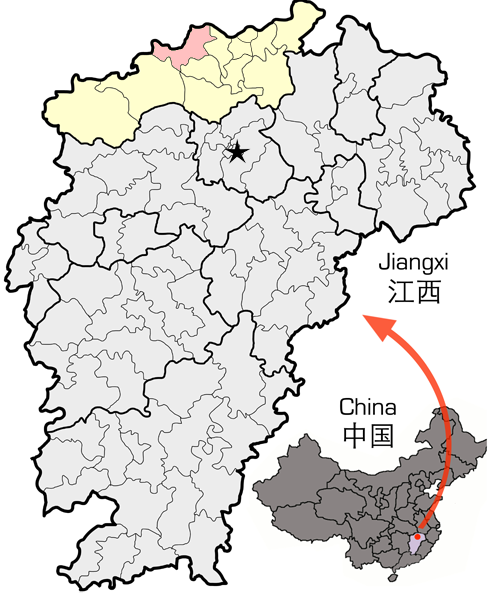
- Location of Ruichang (red) in Jiujiang City (yellow) and Jiangxi
- Coordinates: 29°40′34″N 115°40′52″E
- Country: People's Republic of China
- Province: Jiangxi
- Prefecture-level city: Jiujiang

Area
  - Total: 1,423.11 km^{2} (549.47 sq mi)

Population (2018)
  - Total: 462,700
  - Density: 325.1/km^{2} (842.1/sq mi)
- Postal Code: 332200

Ruichang (Chinese: 瑞昌; pinyin: Ruìchāng) is a county-level city under the jurisdiction of Jiujiang, in the north of Jiangxi province, along the Yangtze River, bordering Hubei province to the north.

Ruichang suffered deaths and extensive damage from the 2005 Ruichang earthquake.

== Administrative divisions ==
Ruichang City is divided to 2 subdistricts, 8 towns and 9 townships.

2 subdistricts

- Pencheng (湓城街道)
- Guilin (桂林街道)

8 towns

- Matou (码头镇)
- Baiyang (白杨镇)
- Nanyi (南义镇)
- Henggang (横港镇)
- Fan (范镇)
- Zhaochen (肇陈镇)
- Gaofeng (高丰镇)
- Xiafan (夏畈镇)

9 townships

- Leyuan (乐园乡)
- Hongyi (洪一乡)
- Huayuan (花园乡)
- Hongxia (洪下乡)
- Leyuan (乐园乡)
- Wujiao (武蛟乡)
- Henglishan (横立山乡)
- Huangjin (黄金乡)
- Nanyang (南阳乡)

== Transportation ==
Ruichang is served by the Wuhan–Jiujiang Railway.

== Climate ==
Climate data for Ruichang, elevation 41 m (135 ft), (1991–2020 normals, extremes 1981–present)
Month	Jan	Feb	Mar	Apr	May	Jun	Jul	Aug	Sep	Oct	Nov	Dec	Year
Record high °C (°F)	21.8 (71.2)	28.0 (82.4)	34.2 (93.6)	34.4 (93.9)	36.9 (98.4)	37.7 (99.9)	40.8 (105.4)	40.1 (104.2)	38.3 (100.9)	39.7 (103.5)	30.1 (86.2)	24.0 (75.2)	40.8 (105.4)
Mean daily maximum °C (°F)	8.5 (47.3)	11.4 (52.5)	16.1 (61.0)	22.6 (72.7)	27.3 (81.1)	30.1 (86.2)	33.6 (92.5)	32.9 (91.2)	28.9 (84.0)	23.7 (74.7)	17.5 (63.5)	11.2 (52.2)	22.0 (71.6)
Daily mean °C (°F)	4.6 (40.3)	7.1 (44.8)	11.4 (52.5)	17.5 (63.5)	22.5 (72.5)	25.8 (78.4)	29.2 (84.6)	28.4 (83.1)	24.3 (75.7)	18.7 (65.7)	12.5 (54.5)	6.7 (44.1)	17.4 (63.3)
Mean daily minimum °C (°F)	1.8 (35.2)	4.0 (39.2)	7.8 (46.0)	13.5 (56.3)	18.5 (65.3)	22.4 (72.3)	25.6 (78.1)	25.1 (77.2)	21.0 (69.8)	15.0 (59.0)	9.0 (48.2)	3.5 (38.3)	13.9 (57.1)
Record low °C (°F)	−6.4 (20.5)	−6.2 (20.8)	−3.4 (25.9)	1.2 (34.2)	9.3 (48.7)	14.0 (57.2)	17.8 (64.0)	17.3 (63.1)	12.0 (53.6)	2.5 (36.5)	−2.5 (27.5)	−10.3 (13.5)	−10.3 (13.5)
Average precipitation mm (inches)	74.9 (2.95)	91.1 (3.59)	142.5 (5.61)	177.1 (6.97)	190.3 (7.49)	230.8 (9.09)	191.7 (7.55)	133.7 (5.26)	95.2 (3.75)	63.1 (2.48)	68.3 (2.69)	48.7 (1.92)	1,507.4 (59.35)
Average precipitation days (≥ 0.1 mm)	12.5	12.6	15.7	14.3	14.5	14.7	11.7	12.2	8.7	8.4	10	9.3	144.6
Average snowy days	3.9	2.2	0.5	0	0	0	0	0	0	0	0.1	1.6	8.3
Average relative humidity (%)	78	78	77	76	76	80	77	78	77	75	77	76	77
Mean monthly sunshine hours	81.6	83.2	101.9	127.1	142.0	119.5	183.7	179.6	146.5	140.2	116.3	107.7	1,529.3
Percentage possible sunshine	25	26	27	33	34	28	43	44	40	40	37	34	34
Source: China Meteorological Administration
