= 2005 Ruichang earthquake =

Earthquake in China

- Location within China
- UTC time: 2005-11-26 00:49:37
- ISC event: 7759114
- USGS-ANSS: ComCat
- Local date: 26 November 2005
- Local time: 08:49:37 CST (UTC+8)
- Magnitude: M_{w} 5.2–5.7
- Depth: 11.1 km (7 mi)
- Epicenter: 29.671°N 115.688°E
- Areas affected: Jiangxi and Hubei provinces, China
- Max. intensity: MMI VII (Very strong)
- Aftershocks: 497 recorded (as of 29 November 2005)
- Casualties: 21 dead, 8,000 injured

On 26 November 2005, a M_{w} 5.2 earthquake struck the province of Jiangxi in eastern China, killing 21 people, injuring 8,000 others and severely damaging tens of thousands of homes in Jiangxi and Hubei provinces, mostly in the counties of Ruichang and Jiujiang.

== Earthquake ==
The earthquake had an epicenter located directly beneath the city of Ruichang, in Jiangxi province. The United States Geological Survey (USGS) reported a magnitude of M_{wb} 5.2 and a depth of 11.1 km (6.9 mi), while the China Earthquake Networks Center (CENC) placed the magnitude at M_{w} 5.7. It was the largest earthquake to strike the area in over 50 years. At least 497 aftershocks were detected by the CENC by 29 November.

== Impact ==
At least 21 deaths, 8,000 injuries and 150,000 heavily damaged or destroyed homes were recorded in Ruichang and Jiujiang counties. Jiujiang recorded 13 fatalities and 247 serious injuries. In the county, up to 4,000 homes collapsed and 66,000 others were seriously damaged. In Ruichang, six people died, 8,000 houses collapsed and over 420,000 people fled from their homes. In Hubei, two people were killed and cracks formed in buildings in Wuhan.

== Response ==
The Ministry of Civil Affairs said that they were sending emergency aid to the affected region. A specialist earthquake task force was also sent to Ruichang from Beijing. Over 1,000 tents were also sent to the affected area.

In less than twelve hours after the earthquake struck, the Red Cross Society of China's Jiangxi provincial Jiujiang county and Ruichang city branches immediately released family tents to provide shelter to some 500 people. The RCSC branch staff worked quickly to gather information about the extent of the damage and identify priority needs in the affected area. The Chinese government supported the RCSC with funds released from the Disaster Response Emergency Fund (DREF) to address the needs for temporary shelter and protection for up to 2,000 affected families, with the immediate release of 200 family-sized tents (each tent housing seven people) and 2,000 quilts from the RCSC disaster preparedness centre in Xiaogan. This is based on information provided by the local branches to the relief division at RCSC headquarters in Beijing, as well as discussions held on 27 November between representatives from the Federation and the RCSC relief division. The RCSC Xiaogan disaster preparedness centre was located in Hubei province, close to the Jiangxi border, Ruichang county and Jiujiang city. Road access from the centre to the affected area remained intact following the earthquake. Additionally, due to damaged water sources, the Chinese government supported RCSC headquarters with the release and distribution of approximately 1,650 cartons of water purification tablets, which would be distributed throughout the affected area.

== See also ==
- List of earthquakes in 2005
- List of earthquakes in China
