= Nijō, Fukuoka =

Dissolved municipality in Fukuoka prefecture, Japan

Coordinates: 33°31′N 130°9′E

Map showing location of Nijō in Fukuoka Prefecture (as of 2006).

Nijō (二丈町, Nijō-machi) was a town located in Itoshima District, Fukuoka Prefecture, Japan.

As of November 2009, the town had an estimated population of 13,011 and a density of 227.98 persons per km^{2}. The total area is 57.07 km^{2}.

On January 1, 2010, Nijō, along with the city of Maebaru, and the town of Shima (also from Itoshima District), was merged to create the City of Itoshima. Itoshima District was dissolved as a result of this merger.
