= Itoshima District, Fukuoka =

Former district in Fukuoka prefecture, Japan

Coordinates: 33°33′18″N 130°11′10″E

Itoshima (糸島郡, Itoshima-gun) was a district located in northwestern Fukuoka Prefecture, Japan. Before its dissolution, the district comprised two towns: Shima (志摩町) and Nijō (二丈町). On January 1, 2010, the towns of Nijō and Shima – along with the city of Maebaru – were merged to create the city of Itoshima. Itoshima District was dissolved as a result of this merger.

== Municipalities ==
=== Municipalities at the time of the formation ===
- Village of Imajuku (今宿村)
- Village of Susenji (周船寺村)
- Village of Motooka (元岡村)
- Village of Imazu (今津村)
- Village of Kitazaki (北崎村)
- Village of Maebaru (前原村)
- Village of Kafuri (加布里村)
- Village of Nagaito (長糸村)
- Village of Raizan (雷山村)
- Village of Ito (怡土村)
- Village of Hatae (波多江村)
- Village of Kaya (可也村)
- Village of Sakurano (桜野村)
- Village of Kofuji (小富士村)
- Village of Keya (芥屋村)
- Village of Ikisan (一貴山村)
- Village of Fukae (深江村)
- Village of Fukuyoshi (福吉村)

=== Municipal Timeline ===
- September 15, 1901 - The village of Maebaru was elevated to town status to become the town of Maebaru. (1 town, 17 villages)
- April 1, 1931 - The town of Maebaru, and the villages of Hatae and Kafuri were merged to create the town of Maebaru. (1 town, 15 villages)
- October 15, 1941 - The village of Imajuku was merged into the City of Fukuoka. (1 town, 14 villages)
- April 1, 1942 - The village of Imazu was merged into the city of Fukuoka. (1 town, 13 villages)
- January 1, 1955: (1 town, 6 villages)
  - The town of Maebaru, and the villages of Raizan and Nagaito were merged to create the town of Maebaru.
  - The villages of Ikisan, Fukae and Fukuyoshi were merged to create the village of Nijō.
  - The villages of Kaya, Sakurano, Kofuji and Keya were merged to create the village of Shima.
- April 1, 1955 - The village of Ito was merged into the town of Maebaru. (1 town, 5 villages)
- April 1, 1961 - The villages of Motooka, Susenji and Kitazaki were merged into the city of Fukuoka. (1 town, 2 villages)
- April 1, 1965: (3 towns)
  - The village of Nijō was elevated to town status to become the town of Nijō.
  - The village of Shima was elevated to town status to become the town of Shima.
- October 1, 1992 - The town of Maebaru was elevated to city status to become the city of Maebaru. (2 towns)
- January 1, 2010 - The towns of Nijō and Shima, along with the city of Maebaru, were merged to create the city of Itoshima. Itoshima District was dissolved as a result of this merger.

== See also ==
- List of dissolved districts of Japan
