= 2005 Hindu Kush earthquake =

Earthquake in northeastern Afghanistan with a magnitude of 6.5 on December 12

- Location within Afghanistan
- UTC time: 2005-12-12 21:47:45
- ISC event: 7996705
- USGS-ANSS: ComCat
- Local date: December 13, 2005
- Local time: 02:17:45 AFT
- Magnitude: 6.5 M_{w} 6.0 mb
- Depth: 224.6 km (140 mi)
- Epicenter: 36.36°N 71.01°E
- Areas affected: Afghanistan; Pakistan; Tajikistan
- Max. intensity: MMI V (Moderate)
- Casualties: 5 dead 1 injured

The 2005 Hindu Kush earthquake hit northeastern Afghanistan with a magnitude of 6.5 on December 12 at 21:47 (UTC). According to the United States Geological Survey, the maximum Mercalli intensity was V (Moderate) at Chitral, in Pakistan's Khyber Pakhtunkhwa province. Five people were killed in the Hindu Kush region and landslides blocked several roads near Bagh, Kashmir. The earthquake occurred some 65 miles from Faizabad, an Afghan city in the Hindu Kush mountains, but it could be felt in many neighboring areas, and even some 200 miles away in Islamabad, Pakistan. The quake was strong enough to trigger panic among survivors of October's devastating earthquake, who came out from their makeshift shelters in freezing temperatures. Although magnitude–6 earthquakes typically cause severe damage, this quake caused relatively little because it occurred deep underground (224.6 km (140 mi)).

== See also ==
- List of earthquakes in 2005
- List of earthquakes in Afghanistan

== Sources ==
- ANSS, "Hindu Kush 2005: M 6.5 – Hindu Kush region, Afghanistan", Comprehensive Catalog, U.S. Geological Survey
- Brumfiel, Geoff (March 2, 2006), "Seismology: Shaking the foundations", Nature, 440 (7080): 16–8, Bibcode:2006Natur.440...16B, doi:10.1038/440016a, PMID 16511464, S2CID 4403382.
- International Seismological Centre, ISC-EHB Bulletin, Thatcham, United Kingdom
- PAGER-CAT Earthquake Catalog, Version 2008_06.1, United States Geological Survey, September 4, 2009, archived from the original on March 13, 2020.
