= Shima, Fukuoka =

Dissolved municipality in Fukuoka prefecture, Japan

Coordinates: 33°35′N 130°11′E

Map showing location of Shima in Fukuoka Prefecture (as of 2006).

Shima (志摩町, Shima-machi) was a town located in Itoshima District, Fukuoka Prefecture, Japan.

== Population ==
As of November 2009, the town had an estimated population of 17,432 and a density of 319.56 persons per km^{2}. The total area was 54.54 km^{2}.

== History ==
On January 1, 2010, Shima, along with the city of Maebaru, and the town of Nijō (also from Itoshima District), was merged to create the City of Itoshima. Itoshima District was dissolved as a result of this merger.
