= Tsunami advisory =

Public warning of a tsunami approaching

A tsunami advisory means that a tsunami with potential for strong currents or waves dangerous to those in or very near the water is expected or occurring. There may be flooding of beach and harbor areas. Stay out of the water and away from beaches and waterways. Follow instructions from local officials.

== Example of a tsunami advisory ==
TSUNAMI MESSAGE NUMBER 10
NWS PACIFIC TSUNAMI WARNING CENTER EWA BEACH HI
101 AM HST SUN October 28, 2012
 
TO - CIVIL DEFENSE IN THE STATE OF HAWAII
 
SUBJECT - TSUNAMI ADVISORY
 
THE TSUNAMI WARNING IS NOW CANCELLED FOR THE STATE OF HAWAII.
 
A TSUNAMI ADVISORY IS ISSUED FOR THE STATE OF HAWAII EFFECTIVE
AT 1254 AM HST.
 
AN EARTHQUAKE HAS OCCURRED WITH THESE PRELIMINARY PARAMETERS
 
   ORIGIN TIME - 0504 PM HST October 27, 2012
   COORDINATES - 52.8 NORTH 131.8 WEST
   LOCATION    - QUEEN CHARLOTTE ISLANDS REGION
   MAGNITUDE   - 7.7 MOMENT
 
EVALUATION
 
 BASED ON ALL AVAILABLE DATA THE TSUNAMI THREAT HAS DECREASED AND
 IS NOW AT THE ADVISORY LEVEL AND NOT EXPECTED TO INCREASE. SEA
 LEVEL CHANGES AND STRONG CURRENTS MAY STILL OCCUR ALONG ALL COASTS
 THAT COULD BE A HAZARD TO SWIMMERS AND BOATERS AS WELL AS TO PERSONS
 NEAR THE SHORE AT BEACHES AND IN HARBORS AND MARINAS. THE THREAT
 MAY CONTINUE FOR SEVERAL HOURS.
 
MESSAGES WILL BE ISSUED HOURLY OR SOONER AS CONDITIONS WARRANT.
 
$$

== See also ==
- Severe weather terminology (United States)
