= Genkai Island =

Island in Nishi-ku, Fukuoka, Japan

Native name: 玄界島 Genkai-jima
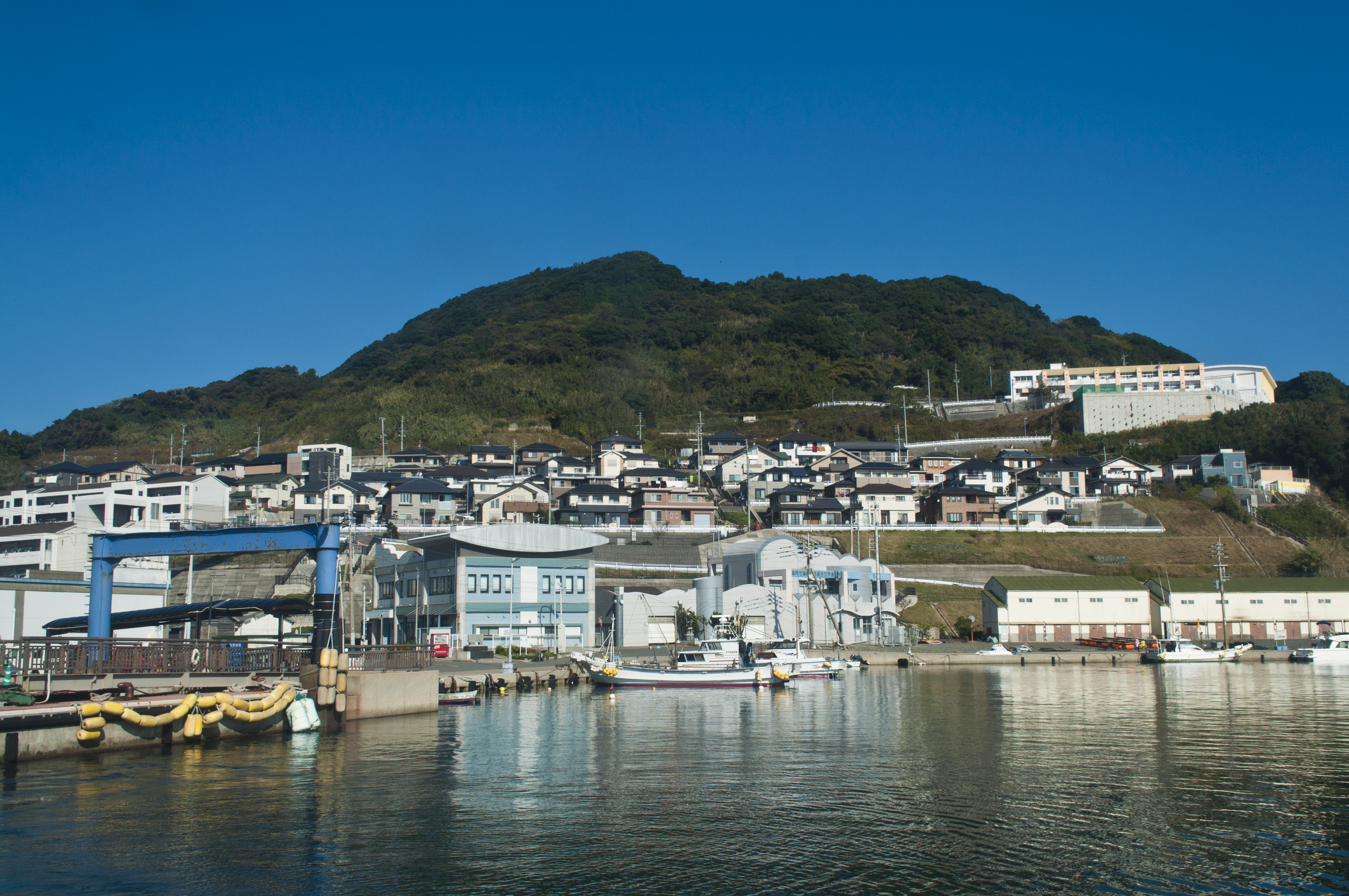
- Genkai Island

- Location within Japan Location within Kyushu Location within Fukuoka Prefecture

Geography
- Location: Genkai Sea
- Coordinates: 33°41′24″N 130°14′0″E
- Area: 1.14 km^{2} (0.44 sq mi)
- Coastline: 4.4 km (2.73 mi)
- Highest elevation: 217.9 m (714.9 ft)
- Highest point: Mt.Tōmi (遠見山, Tōmi-yama)

Administration
- Japan
- Prefecture: Fukuoka Prefecture
- City: Fukuoka City
- Ward: Nishi-ku

Additional information
- Official website: Genkai-jima Official Site (in Japanese)

Genkai Island (玄界島, Genkai-jima) is an island in Nishi-ku, Fukuoka, Japan. The island was seriously damaged by the 2005 Fukuoka earthquake. The affected areas of the island were reconstructed by 2008.

== Access ==
- Fukuoka Municipal Ferry Service (福岡市営渡船, Fukuoka Shi-ei Tosen)
  - Hakata Port - Genkai Island Port
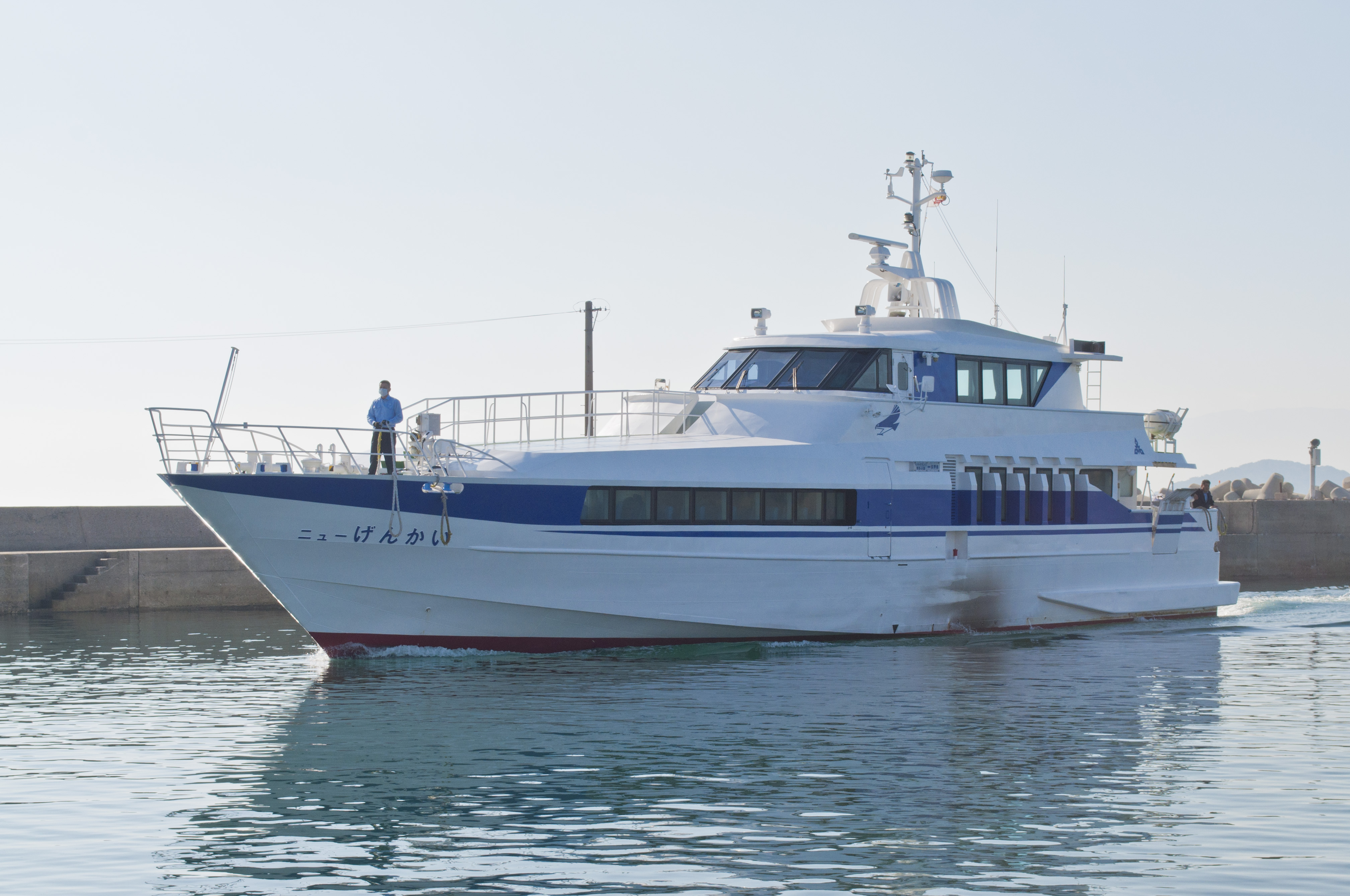
New Genkai at Genkai Island Port
