= Taiping, Pingguo =

Taiping 太平镇
- Town
- Location in Guangxi
- Coordinates: 23°29′37″N 107°30′58″E
- Country: People's Republic of China
- Autonomous region: Guangxi
- Prefecture-level city: Baise
- County-level city: Pingguo
- Time zone: UTC+8 (China Standard)

Taiping (Chinese: 太平; pinyin: Tàipíng) is a town of Pingguo, Guangxi, China. As of 2020, it had twenty villages under its administration:

- Taiping Village
- Paolie Village (袍烈村)
- Xinwei Village (新圩村)
- Neihong Village (内洪村)
- Gan'ai Village (甘艾村)
- Renqing Village (仁庆村)
- Chami Village (茶密村)
- Buyang Village (布洋村)
- Juping Village (局平村)
- Gu'an Village (古案村)
- Longzhu Village (龙竹村)
- Zhuanglie Village (壮烈村)
- Yanshan Village (雁山村)
- Nagong Village (那供村)
- Jilin Village (吉林村)
- Linlin Village (临林村)
- Wangli Village (旺里村)
- Yangliang Village (仰良村)
- Qiliang Village (七良村)
- Bale Village (巴乐村)

== See also ==
- List of township-level divisions of Guangxi
