= Maebaru, Fukuoka =

Dissolved municipality in Fukuoka prefecture, Japan

Coordinates: 33°33′N 130°12′E

Map showing location of Maebaru in Fukuoka Prefecture (as of 2006).

Maebaru (前原市, Maebaru-shi) was a city located in Fukuoka Prefecture, Japan. It existed from October 1, 1992, to December 31, 2009.

As of November 2009, the city had an estimated population of 68,583 in the total area of 104.50 km^{2}.

On January 1, 2010, Maebaru, along with the towns of Nijō and Shima (both from Itoshima District), was merged to create the City of Itoshima. Itoshima District was dissolved as a result of this merger.
